= 2024 World Athletics Indoor Championships – Women's 4 × 400 metres relay =

Women's 4 × 400 metres at the 2024 World Athletics Indoor Championships
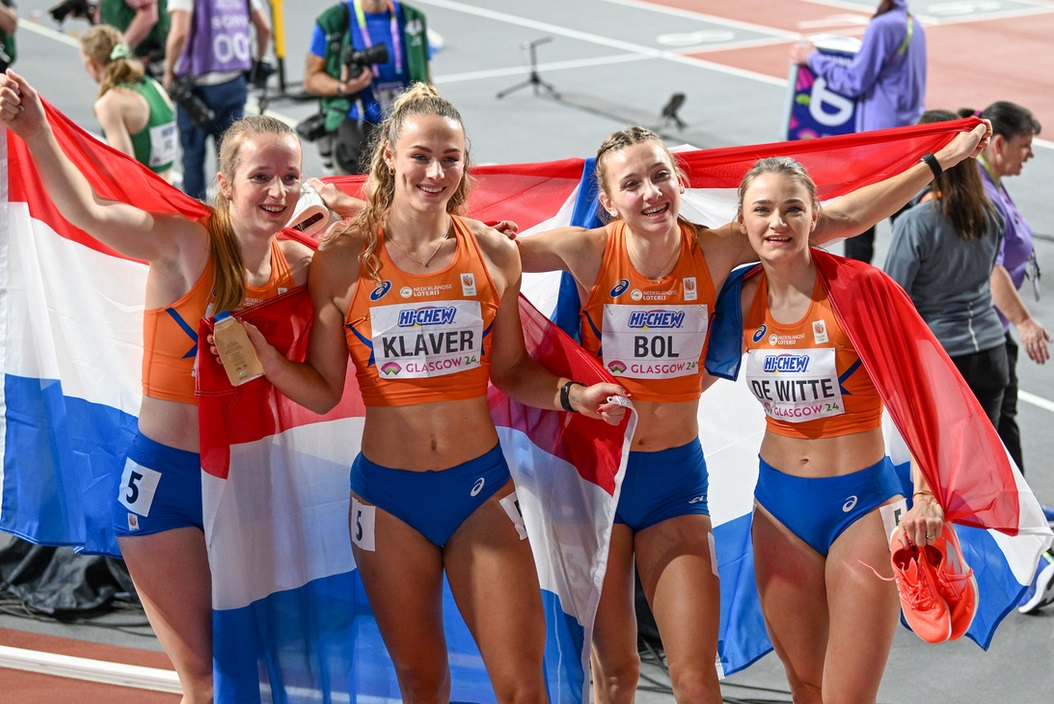
- The Dutch relay team with Cathelijn Peeters, Lieke Klaver, Femke Bol, and Lisanne de Witte after winning the final
- Venue: Commonwealth Arena
- Location: Glasgow, United Kingdom
- Dates: 3 March 2024 (round 1 and final)
- Teams: 9 nations
- Winning time: 3:25.07 min NR

Medalists
| gold medal | Lieke Klaver; Cathelijn Peeters; Lisanne de Witte; Femke Bol; Myrte van der Schoot (Note: This athlete competed in round 1, but was replaced in the final.); Eveline Saalberg | Netherlands |
| silver medal | Quanera Hayes; Talitha Diggs; Bailey Lear; Alexis Holmes; Jessica Wright; Na'Asha Robinson | United States |
| bronze medal | Laviai Nielsen; Lina Nielsen; Ama Pipi; Jessie Knight; Hannah Kelly | Great Britain |

The women's 4 × 400 metres relay at the 2024 World Athletics Indoor Championships was held over two rounds at the Commonwealth Arena in Glasgow, United Kingdom, on 3 March 2024. It was the seventeenth time this relay was contested at the World Athletics Indoor Championships. There was no entry standard for the qualification. Nine national teams competed in the event.

The two heats of round 1 were held on 3 March in the morning, where the first two teams in each heat and the next two fastest teams qualified for the final. National records were set by the teams of Great Britain and Northern Ireland (3:26.40 minutes), Belgium (3:28.07 min), Ireland (3:28.92 min), and Portugal (3:31.93 min).

The final was held on 3 March in the evening. The team of the Netherlands won the gold medal in a national record of 3:25.07 min, followed by the team of the United States who won silver in 3:25.34 min, and then the team of Great Britain and Northern Ireland who won bronze in another new national record of 3:26.36 min. The team of Belgium also set a new national record of 3:28.05 min in the final.

== Background ==
The women's 4 × 400 metres relay was contested sixteen times at the World Athletics Indoor Championships before 2024. The 2024 World Athletics Indoor Championships were held at the 200-metre indoor track in the Commonwealth Arena in Glasgow, Scotland, United Kingdom.

Before the Championships, the world record was 3:23.37 min, set by the Russian relay team in 2006; the championship record was 3:23.85 min, set by the American relay team in 2018; and the world leading performance was 3:25.59 min, set by the relay team of the Arkansas Razorbacks on 27 January 2024.

Records before the 2024 World Athletics Indoor Championships
| Record | Team | Time | Location | Date |
|---|---|---|---|---|
| World record | Russia | 3:23.37 | Glasgow, United Kingdom | 28 January 2006 |
| Championship record | United States | 3:23.85 | Birmingham, United Kingdom | 4 March 2018 |
| World leading | Arkansas Razorbacks | 3:25.59 | Fayetteville, Arkansas, United States | 27 January 2024 |

== Qualification ==
There was no entry standard for qualification for the women's 4 × 400 metres relay, every nation could enter a team with up to eight athletes of 16 years or older.

== Results ==
=== Round 1 ===
Nine teams competed in the two heats of the first round, starting at 11:10 (UTC) in the morning. The first two teams in each heat (Q) and the next two fastest teams (q) advanced to the final. In the first heat, the team of Belgium set a national record (NR) of 3:28.07 min and the team of Ireland set a national record (NR) of 3:28.45 min. In the second heat, the team of Great Britain and Northern Ireland set a national record (NR) of 3:26.40 min, which was the fastest time in round 1, and the team of Portugal set a national record (NR) of 3:31.93 min, which was the slowest time in this round.

Results of the two heats in round 1
| Rank | Heat | Lane | Nation | Athletes | Time | Notes |
|---|---|---|---|---|---|---|
| 1 | 2 | 5 | (United Kingdom) Great Britain & N.I. | Lina Nielsen, Ama Pipi, Hannah Kelly, Jessie Knight | 3:26.40 | Q, NR |
| 2 | 2 | 6 | Jamaica | Junelle Bromfield, Andrenette Knight, Charokee Young, Leah Anderson | 3:27.35 | Q, SB |
| 3 | 1 | 6 | Netherlands | Myrte van der Schoot, Eveline Saalberg, Lisanne de Witte, Femke Bol | 3:27.70 | Q, SB |
| 4 | 1 | 5 | United States | Quanera Hayes, Jessica Wright, Na'Asha Robinson, Bailey Lear | 3:28.04 | Q |
| 5 | 1 | 3 | Belgium | Naomi Van den Broeck, Imke Vervaet, Helena Ponette, Cynthia Bolingo | 3:28.07 | q, NR |
| 6 | 1 | 4 | Ireland | Phil Healy, Sophie Becker, Róisín Harrison, Sharlene Mawdsley | 3:28.45 | q, NR |
| 7 | 2 | 3 | Czech Republic | Tereza Petržilková, Terezie Táborská, Lurdes Manuel, Lada Vondrová | 3:28.57 | SB |
| 8 | 2 | 4 | Poland | Marika Popowicz-Drapała, Kinga Gacka, Anna Gryc, Justyna Święty-Ersetic | 3:28.80 | SB |
| 9 | 2 | 2 | Portugal | Fatoumata Binta Diallo, Carina Vanessa, Cátia Azevedo, Vera Barbosa | 3:31.93 | NR |

=== Final ===
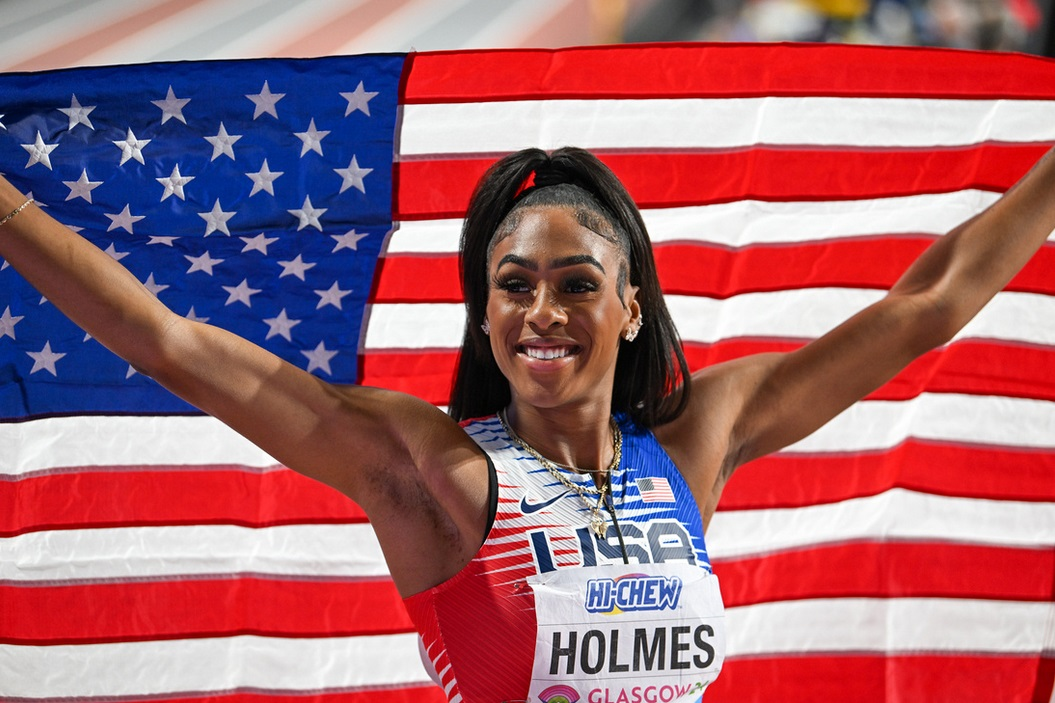
Alexis Holmes of the United States celebrating her team's second place

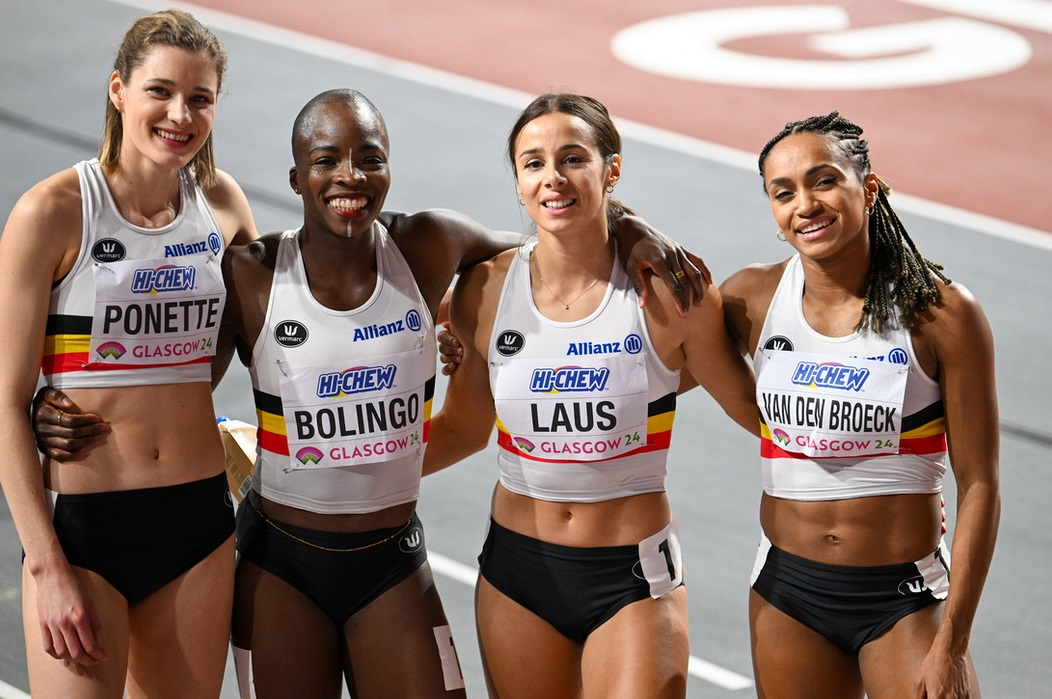
Helena Ponette, Cynthia Bolingo, Camille Laus, and Naomi Van den Broeck of Belgium after they set their national record

Six teams competed in the final, starting at 20:32 (UTC) in the evening. In the opening leg, individual 400 metres silver medalist Lieke Klaver of the Netherlands created a seven-metre lead and was the first to pass the baton, followed by Lanae-Tava Thomas of Jamaica and then Laviai Nielsen of Great Britain and Northern Ireland; Quanera Hayes of the United States handed over in fifth position. In the second leg, Cathelijn Peeters of the Netherlands was able to remain in first position, followed by Andrenette Knight of Jamaica still in second position and then Talitha Diggs of the United States who advanced to the third position; Lina Nielsen of Great Britain and Northern Ireland passed the baton in fourth position. In the third leg, Lisanne de Witte of the Netherlands continued the leading position, while Charokee Young of Jamaica did not finish (DNF) after losing hold of the baton; Bailey Lear of the United States handed over second and Ama Pipi of Great Britain and Northern Ireland third. In the anchor leg, individual 400 metres gold medalist Femke Bol of the Netherlands, individual 400 metres bronze medalist Alexis Holmes of the United States, and Jessie Knight of Great Britain and Northern Ireland finished in the order they started.

The team of the Netherlands won the gold medal in a world leading time (WL) and national record (NR) of 3:25.07 min. It was the first time a Dutch women's team won this title. The team of the United States won silver in 3:25.34 min and the team of Great Britain and Northern Ireland won bronze in a national record (NR) of 3:26.36 min. Outside the medals, the team of Belgium set a national record (NR) of 3:28.05 min. Klaver had the fastest split time of 50.26 s.

Jason Henderson wrote for Athletics Weekly: "After setting a world record in the individual women's 400m, Femke Bol was always going to be difficult to beat in the final leg of the 4x400m. When she was given the baton in the lead, though, it looked a formality." Reporting for World Athletics, Simon Turnbull thought that "Bol was playing it safe" in order to avoid a repeat of her fall during the mixed relay at the 2023 World Championships where she also raced against Holmes. The final was Bol's last contest of these championships, where she ran five 400-metre races in three days, setting one world record and winning two gold medals. Afterwards she said in an interview: "I feel so tired. But the championships are like this. These girls give me so much energy to run and especially if they give me the baton on the first place. It is such a great team, you cannot let them down. If I was alone on the track, I would probably not have enough power but I just did it for these girls."

Results in the final
| Rank | Lane | Nation | Athletes | Time | Notes |
|---|---|---|---|---|---|
| 1st place, gold medalist(s) | 5 | Netherlands | Lieke Klaver, Cathelijn Peeters, Lisanne de Witte, Femke Bol | 3:25.07 | WL NR |
| 2nd place, silver medalist(s) | 4 | United States | Quanera Hayes, Talitha Diggs, Bailey Lear, Alexis Holmes | 3:25.34 | SB |
| 3rd place, bronze medalist(s) | 6 | (United Kingdom) Great Britain & N.I. | Laviai Nielsen, Lina Nielsen, Ama Pipi, Jessie Knight | 3:26.36 | NR |
| 4 | 1 | Belgium | Naomi Van den Broeck, Helena Ponette, Camille Laus, Cynthia Bolingo | 3:28.05 | NR |
| 5 | 2 | Ireland | Phil Healy, Sophie Becker, Róisín Harrison, Sharlene Mawdsley | 3:28.92 | |
| | 3 | Jamaica | Lanae-Tava Thomas, Andrenette Knight, Charokee Young, Stacey Ann Williams | DNF | |
