= 2022 World Athletics Indoor Championships – Women's 4 × 400 metres relay =

Women's 4 × 400 metres relay at the 2022 World Athletics Indoor Championships
- Venue: Štark Arena
- Location: Belgrade, Serbia
- Dates: 20 March 2022 (round 1 and final)
- Teams: 10 nations
- Winning time: 3:28.40 min

Medalists
gold medal	Junelle Bromfield; Janieve Russell; Roneisha McGregor; Stephenie Ann McPherson; Tiffany James (Note: This athlete competed in round 1, but was replaced in the final.)	Jamaica
silver medal	Lieke Klaver; Eveline Saalberg; Lisanne de Witte; Femke Bol; Andrea Bouma	Netherlands
bronze medal	Natalia Kaczmarek; Iga Baumgart-Witan; Kinga Gacka; Justyna Święty-Ersetic; Aleksandra Gaworska	Poland

The women's 4 × 400 metres relay at the 2022 World Athletics Indoor Championships was held over two rounds at the Štark Arena in Belgrade, Serbia, on 20 March 2022.

In round 1, national records were set by the teams of Belgium (3:30.58 minutes), Ireland (3:30.97 minutes), Canada (3:31.45 minutes), and Slovenia (3:37.08 minutes). Of the ten national teams competing round 1, six teams qualified for the final, where the gold medal was won by the team of Jamaica in 3:28.40 minutes, the silver medal by the team of the Netherlands in 3:28.57 minutes and the bronze medal by the team of Poland in 3:28.59 minutes.

== Background ==
Records before the 2022 World Athletics Indoor Championships
Record	Team	Time	Location	Date
World record	Russia	3:23.37	Glasgow, United Kingdom	28 January 2006
Championship record	United States	3:23.85	Birmingham, United Kingdom	4 March 2018
World leading	Arkansas Razorbacks	3:24.09	College Station, Texas, USA	26 February 2022

== Qualification ==
There was no entry standard for the women's 4 × 400 metres relay at these championships. For every nation, one team of up to eight members of 16 years or older could be entered.

== Results ==
=== Round 1 ===
The two heats of round 1 were held during the morning session, starting at 11:45. The first two teams in each heat (Q) and the next two fastest teams (q) advanced to the final. In the first heat, the team of Belgium set a national record (NR) of 3:30.58 min. In the second heat, the team of Ireland set a national record (NR) of 3:30.97 min, the team of Canada set a national record (NR) of 3:31.45 min, and the team of Slovenia set a national record (NR) of 3:37.08 min.

Results from round 1
Rank	Heat	Lane	Nation	Athletes	Time	Notes
1	1	6	United States	Jessica Beard, Brittany Aveni, Natashia Jackson, Lynna Irby	3:28.82	Q, SB
2	1	5	Netherlands	Lieke Klaver, Eveline Saalberg, Andrea Bouma, Lisanne de Witte	3:29.36	Q, SB
3	2	6	Poland	Iga Baumgart-Witan, Aleksandra Gaworska, Natalia Kaczmarek, Justyna Święty-Ersetic	3:30.51	Q, SB
4	1	3	Belgium	Hanne Claes, Naomi Van den Broeck, Imke Vervaet, Camille Laus	3:30.58	q, NR
5	1	4	Great Britain	Hannah Williams, Ama Pipi, Yemi Mary John, Jessie Knight	3:30.69	q, SB
6	2	5	Jamaica	Roneisha McGregor, Janieve Russell, Tiffany James, Junelle Bromfield	3:30.91	Q, SB
7	2	3	Ireland	Sophie Becker, Róisín Harrison, Sharlene Mawdsley, Phil Healy	3:30.97	NR
8	2	4	Canada	Lauren Gale, Kyra Constantine, Natassha McDonald, Sage Watson	3:31.45	NR
9	1	2	Spain	Sara Gallego, Geena Stephens, Carmen Avilés, Laura Bueno	3:34.92	SB
10	2	2	Slovenia	Agata Zupin, Jerneja Smonkar, Veronika Sadek, Anita Horvat	3:37.08	NR

=== Final ===
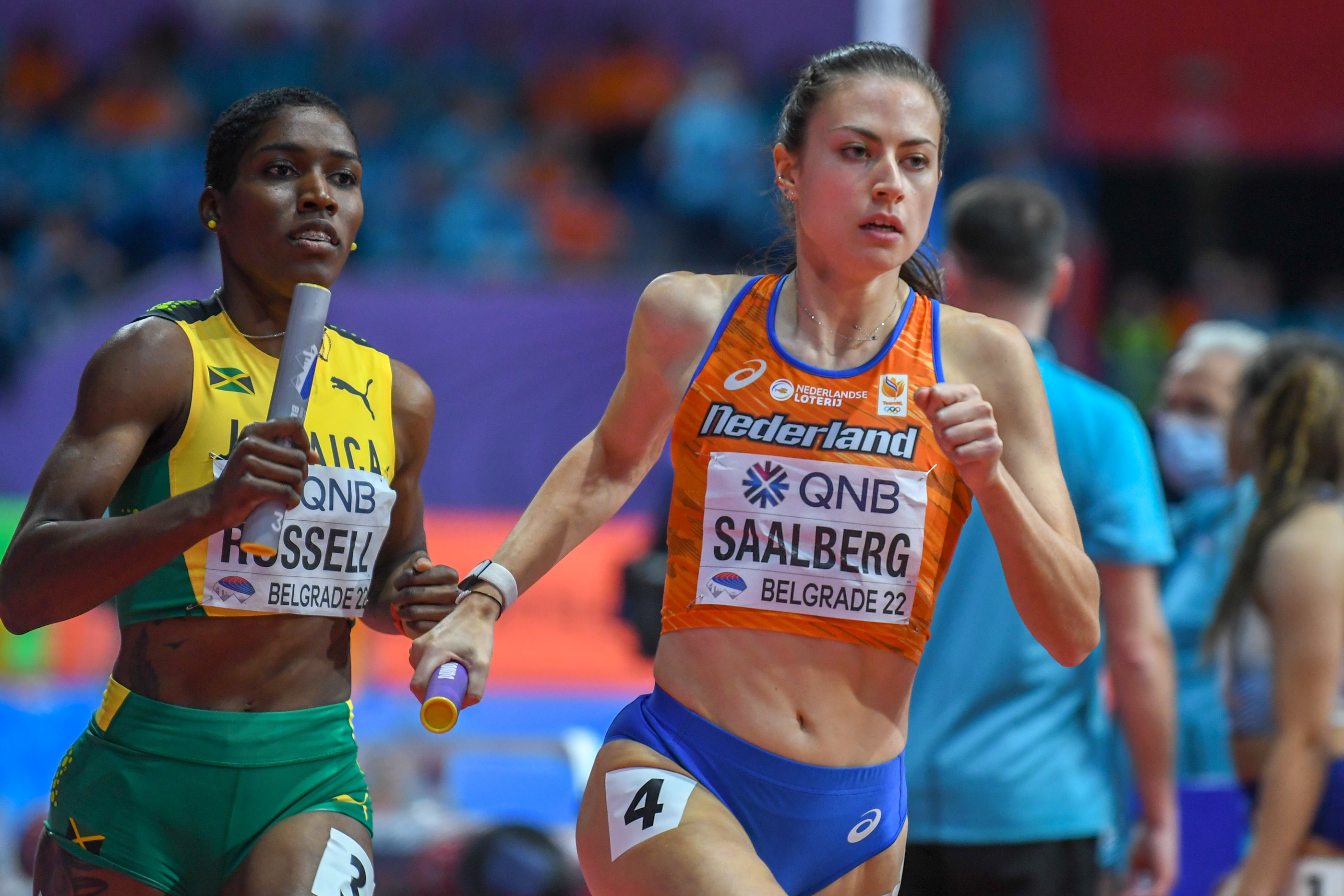
Second-leg runners Janieve Russell of Jamaica and Eveline Saalberg of the Netherlands

The final was held during the evening session, starting at 19:55.

Results from the final
Rank	Lane	Nation	Athletes	Time	Notes
1st place, gold medalist(s)	3	Jamaica	Junelle Bromfield, Janieve Russell, Roneisha McGregor, Stephenie Ann McPherson	3:28.40	SB
2nd place, silver medalist(s)	4	Netherlands	Lieke Klaver, Eveline Saalberg, Lisanne de Witte, Femke Bol	3:28.57	SB
3rd place, bronze medalist(s)	5	Poland	Natalia Kaczmarek, Iga Baumgart-Witan, Kinga Gacka, Justyna Święty-Ersetic	3:28.59	SB
4	6	United States	Na'Asha Robinson, Jessica Beard, Brittany Aveni, Lynna Irby	3:28.63	SB
5	1	Great Britain	Hannah Williams, Ama Pipi, Yemi Mary John, Jessie Knight	3:29.82	SB
6	2	Belgium	Hanne Claes, Naomi Van den Broeck, Imke Vervaet, Camille Laus	3:33.61	
