= 2025 World Athletics Championships – Women's 4 × 400 metres relay =

Women's 4 × 400 metres relay at the 2025 World Athletics Championships
- Venue: National Stadium
- Location: Tokyo, Japan
- Date: 20 September (round 1); 21 September (final)
- Competitors: 73 from 16 nations
- Winning time: 3:16.61 CR

Medalists
gold medal	Isabella Whittaker; Lynna Irby-Jackson; Aaliyah Butler; Sydney McLaughlin-Levrone; Alexis Holmes*; Rosey Effiong*; Quanera Hayes*; Britton Wilson*	United States
silver medal	Dejanea Oakley; Stacey Ann Williams; Andrenette Knight; Nickisha Pryce; Roneisha McGregor*	Jamaica
bronze medal	Eveline Saalberg; Lieke Klaver; Lisanne de Witte; Femke Bol; Myrte van der Schoot*	Netherlands

The women's 4 × 400 metres relay at the 2025 World Athletics Championships was held at the National Stadium in Tokyo on 20 and 21 September 2025.

== Records ==
Before the competition, records were as follows:

Record	Athlete & Nat.	Perf.	Location	Date
World record	Soviet Union (Tatyana Ledovskaya, Olga Nazarova, Mariya Pinigina, Olga Bryzgina)	3:15.17	Seoul, South Korea	1 October 1988
Championship record	United States (Gwen Torrence, Maicel Malone, Natasha Kaiser-Brown, Jearl Miles)	3:16.71	Stuttgart, Germany	22 August 1993
World leading	Captain Athletics	3:23.24	Gainesville, Florida, United States	19 April 2025
African record	Nigeria (Olabisi Afolabi, Fatimat Yusuf, Charity Opara, Falilat Ogunkoya)	3:21.04	Atlanta, Georgia, United States	3 August 1996
Asian record	(China) Hebei (Bai Xiaoyun, Cao Chunying, Ma Yuqin, An Xiaohong)	3:24.28	Beijing, China	13 September 1993
European record	Soviet Union (Tatyana Ledovskaya, Olga Nazarova, Mariya Pinigina, Olga Bryzgina)	3:15.17	Seoul, South Korea	1 October 1988
North, Central American and Caribbean record	United States (Shamier Little, Sydney McLaughlin-Levrone, Gabrielle Thomas, Alexis Holmes)	3:15.27	Paris, France	10 August 2024
South American record	(Brazil) BM&F Bovespa (Geisa Coutinho, Bárbara Farias de Oliveira, Joelma Sousa, Jailma de Lima)	3:26.68	São Paulo, Brazil	7 August 2011
Oceanian record	Australia (Nova Peris-Kneebone, Tamsyn Manou, Melinda Gainsford-Taylor, Cathy Freeman)	3:23.81	Sydney, Australia	30 September 2000

== Qualification standard ==
First fourteen placed teams at the 2025 World Athletics Relays and the next two highest placed team on year top list.

== Schedule ==
The event schedule, in local time (UTC+9), was as follows:

Date	Time	Round
20 September	20:00	Round 1
21 September	20:35	Final

== Results ==
=== Round 1 ===
The first three in each heat ( Q ) and the next two fastest ( q ) qualified for the final.

Results of heat 1
Place	Lane	Nation	Athletes	Time	Notes
1	2	Jamaica	Dejanea Oakley, Stacey-Ann Williams, Roneisha McGregor, Nickisha Pryce	3:22.77	Q, WL
2	5	Norway	Josefine Tomine Eriksen, Amalie Iuel, Astri Ertzgaard, Henriette Jæger	3:23.84	Q, NR
3	3	Poland	Anna Gryc, Alicja Wrona-Kutrzepa, Aleksandra Formella, Natalia Bukowiecka	3:24.39	Q, SB
4	6	Italy	Anna Polinari, Virginia Troiani, Alessandra Bonora, Alice Mangione	3:24.71	q, SB
5	7	Spain	Eva Santidrián, Carmen Avilés, Ana Prieto, Blanca Hervás	3:24.76	
6	8	Germany	Skadi Schier, Johanna Martin, Jana Lakner, Elisa Lechleitner	3:25.33	SB
7	9	Australia	Mia Gross, Ellie Beer, Jemma Pollard, Carla Bull	3:25.43	SB
8	4	Great Britain & N.I.	Victoria Ohuruogu, Poppy Malik, Nicole Yeargin, Yemi Mary John	3:25.84	

Results of heat 2
Place	Lane	Nation	Athletes	Time	Notes
1	5	United States	Alexis Holmes, Rosey Effiong, Quanera Hayes, Britton Wilson	3:22.53	Q, WL
2	4	Belgium	Naomi Van den Broeck, Imke Vervaet, Camille Laus, Helena Ponette	3:23.96	Q, SB
3	3	Netherlands	Eveline Saalberg, Lieke Klaver, Myrte van der Schoot, Lisanne de Witte	3:24.03	Q, SB
4	7	France	Alexe Déau, Fanny Peltier, Isabelle Black, Amandine Brossier	3:24.33	q, SB
5	6	Canada	Zoe Sherar, Lauren Gale, Alyssa Marsh, Dianna Proctor	3:26.33	SB
6	2	Switzerland	Lena Wernli, Iris Caligiuri, Annina Fahr, Catia Gubelmann	3:27.46	SB
7	8	South Africa	Shirley Nekhubui, Marlie Viljoen, Hannah van Niekerk, Zeney van der Walt	3:28.14	
8	9	Ireland	Sophie Becker, Cliodhna Manning, Rachel McCann, Sharlene Mawdsley	3:29.27	

=== Final ===
Results of the final
Place	Lane	Nation	Athletes	Time	Notes
1st place, gold medalist(s)	5	United States	Isabella Whittaker, Lynna Irby-Jackson, Aaliyah Butler, Sydney McLaughlin-Levrone	3:16.61	CR
2nd place, silver medalist(s)	6	Jamaica	Dejanea Oakley, Stacey-Ann Williams, Andrenette Knight, Nickisha Pryce	3:19.25	SB
3rd place, bronze medalist(s)	9	Netherlands	Eveline Saalberg, Lieke Klaver, Lisanne de Witte, Femke Bol	3:20.18	SB
4	8	Belgium	Naomi Van den Broeck, Imke Vervaet, Camille Laus, Helena Ponette	3:22.15	SB
5	4	Poland	Anna Gryc, Alicja Wrona-Kutrzepa, Justyna Święty-Ersetic, Natalia Bukowiecka	3:22.91	SB
6	7	Norway	Josefine Tomine Eriksen, Amalie Iuel, Astri Ertzgaard, Henriette Jæger	3:23.71	NR
7	2	France	Alexe Déau, Fanny Peltier, Louise Maraval, Amandine Brossier	3:24.08	SB
8	3	Italy	Anna Polinari, Virginia Troiani, Eloisa Coiro, Alice Mangione	3:25.00	
