= 2024 World Athletics Relays – Women's 4 × 400 metres relay =

Women's 4 × 400 metres relay at the 2024 World Athletics Relays
- Venue: Thomas Robinson Stadium
- Dates: 4 May (heats) & 5 May (final)
- Nations: 27
- Winning time: 3:21.70

Medalists
gold medal	Quanera Hayes; Gabrielle Thomas; Bailey Lear; Alexis Holmes; Na'Asha Robinson*	United States
silver medal	Marika Popowicz-Drapała; Iga Baumgart-Witan; Justyna Święty-Ersetic; Natalia Kaczmarek; Kinga Gacka*; Alicja Wrona-Kutrzepa*	Poland
bronze medal	Zoe Sherar; Aiyanna Stiverne; Alyssa Marsh; Kyra Constantine	Canada

The women's 4 × 400 metres relay at the 2024 World Athletics Relays was held at the Thomas Robinson Stadium on 4 and 5 May.

== Records ==
Prior to the competition, the competition records were as follows:

Record	Country	Perf.	Location	Date
World record	Soviet Union	3:15.17	Seoul, South Korea	1 October 1988
Championship record	United States	3:19.39	(The Bahamas) Nassau, Bahamas	3 May 2015
World leading	(United States) Empire Athletics	3:23.83	Gainesville, United States	13 April 2024
African Record	Nigeria	3:21.04	Atlanta, United States	3 August 1996
Asian Record	China	3:24.28	Beijing, China	13 September 1993
North, Central American and Caribbean Record	United States	3:15.51	Seoul, South Korea	1 October 1988
South American Record	Brazil	3:26.68	São Paulo, Brazil	7 August 2011
European Record	Soviet Union	3:15.17	Seoul, South Korea	1 October 1988
Oceanian Record	Australia	3:23.81	Sydney, Australia	30 September 2000

== Results ==
=== Round 1 ===
Qualification: First 2 of each heat (Q) advance to the final and qualify for the 2024 Olympic Games. The remaining teams advance into a repechage round, where they get another chance for Olympic qualification.

- Q Qualified
- OG* = 2024 Olympic Games qualification

Rank	Heat	Nation	Athletes	Time	Notes
1	2	Ireland	Sophie Becker, Rhasidat Adeleke, Phil Healy, Sharlene Mawdsley	3:24.38	Q, OG*, NR
2	4	United States	Quanera Hayes, Bailey Lear, Na'Asha Robinson, Alexis Holmes	3:24.76	Q, OG*,
3	2	United Kingdom	Victoria Ohuruogu, Hannah Kelly, Nicole Yeargin, Lina Nielsen	3:24.89	Q, OG*, SB
4	1	Italy	Rebecca Borga, Ayomide Folorunso, Giancarla Trevisan, Alice Mangione	3:26.28	Q, OG*, SB
5	4	Norway	Josefine Tomine Eriksen, Amalie Iuel, Astri Ertzgaard, Henriette Jaeger	3:26.89	Q, OG*, NR
6	3	Poland	Marika Popowicz-Drapała, Kinga Gacka, Alicja Wrona Kutrzepa, Natalia Kaczmarek	3:27.11	Q, OG*, SB
7	1	Canada	Zoe Sherar, Aiyanna Stiverne, Alyssa Marsh, Kyra Constantine	3:27.17	Q, OG*, SB
8	4	Belgium	Naomi Van den Broeck, Hanne Claes, Liefde Schoemaker, Helene Ponette	3:27.19	SB
9	3	France	Shana Grebo, Fanny Peltier, Diana Iscaye, Camille Seri	3:28.08	Q, OG*, SB
10	1	Netherlands	Eveline Saalberg, Myrte van der Schoot, Lisanne de Witte, Cathelijn Peeters	3:28.10	
11	1	Australia	Bendere Oboya, Ellie Beer, Mikeala Selaidinakos, Alanah Yukich	3:28.20	SB
12	3	Jamaica	Charokee Young, Ashley Williams, Junelle Bromfield, Roneisha McGregor	3:29.03	
13	1	India	Vithya Ramraj, M. R. Poovamma, Jyothika Sri Dandi, Subha Venkatesan	3:29.74	
14	3	Spain	Herminia Parra, Laura Bueno, Eva Santidrián, Berta Segura	3:31.03	SB
15	2	Cuba	Melissa Padrón, Rose Mary Almanza, Lisneidy Veitía, Roxana Gómez	3:31.56	SB
16	3	Germany	Luna Bulmahn, Skadi Schier, Mona Mayer, Hannah Mergenthaler	3:32.04	SB
17	2	Ukraine	Kateryna Karpiuk, Tetiana Kharashchuk, Viktoriya Tkachuk, Maryana Shostak	3:32.31	SB
18	1	Switzerland	Catia Gubelmann, Lena Wernli, Michelle Liem, Yasmin Giger	3:33.43	SB
19	2	Czech Republic	Lurdes Gloria Manuel, Marcela Pírková, Nikola Bendová, Barbora Malíková	3:34.85	
20	1	Zambia	Niddy Mingilishi, Quincy Malekani, Abygirl Sepiso, Rhoda Njobvu	3:35.37	
21	4	Portugal	Carina Vanessa, Vera Barbosa, Juliana Guerreiro, Sofia Lavreshina	3:35.64	
22	2	Colombia	Paola Loboa, Karla Vélez, Nahomy Castro Rosa Escobar	3:39.13	SB
23	3	Botswana	Nancy Budzwani, Christine Botlogetswe, Batisane Kennekae, Galefele Moroko	3:40.66	
24	2	Dominican Republic	Milagros Durán, Franchina Martinez, Mariana Perez, Martha Mendez	3:40.93	SB
25	3	Kenya	Joan Cherono, Diana Chebet, Vanice Kerubo Nyagisera, Rahab Wanjriu Ndirangu	3:44.62	
	4	Brazil	Maria Victoria De Sena, Leticia Lima, Jainy Suelen Dos Santos Barreto, Anny Caroline De Bassi	DQ	TR17.2.3
	4	Nigeria		DNS	

=== Repechage round ===
First 2 of each heat (OG*) qualify for the 2024 Olympic Games.

Rank	Heat	Nation	Athletes	Time	Notes
1	3	Belgium	Naomi Van den Broeck, Imke Vervaet, Camille Laus, Helene Ponette	3:26.79	OG*, SB
2	3	Spain	Carmen Avilés, Berta Segura, Eva Santidrián, Bianca Hervas	3:27.30	OG*, NR
3	2	Netherlands	Eveline Saalberg, Myrte van der Schoot, Lisanne de Witte, Cathelijn Peeters	3:27.45	OG*
4	3	Czech Republic	Lurdes Gloria Manuel, Tereza Petrzilková, Lada Vondrova, Barbora Malíková	3:27.76	SB
5	3	Australia	Bendere Oboya, Ellie Beer, Mikeala Selaidinakos, Alanah Yukich	3:28.05	SB
6	2	Switzerland	Lena Wernli, Annina Fahr, Julia Niederberger, Giulia Senn	3:28.30	OG*, SB
7	1	Jamaica	Charokee Young, Ashley Williams, Junelle Bromfield, Roneisha McGregor	3:28.54	OG*
8	1	India	Rupal, Jyothika Sri Dandi, M. R. Poovamma, Subha Venkatesan	3:29.35	OG*
9	2	Cuba	Melissa Padrón, Rose Mary Almanza, Lisneidy Veitía, Roxana Gómez	3:29.36	SB
10	1	Brazil	Jainy Suelen Dos Santos Barreto, Leticia Lima, Maria Victoria De Sena, Anny Caroline De Bassi	3:31.60	SB
11	1	Germany	Alica Schmidt, Skadi Schier, Mona Mayer, Hannah Mergenthaler	3:32.12	
12	3	Ukraine	Kateryna Karpiuk, Tetiana Kharashchuk, Viktoriya Tkachuk, Maryana Shostak	3:33.43	
13	3	Zambia	Rhoda Njobvu, Quincy Malekani, Abygirl Sepiso, Niddy Mingilishi	3:34.55	
14	2	Portugal	Carina Vanessa, Sofia Lavreshina, Juliana Guerreiro, Vera Barbosa	3:35.25	
15	1	Colombia	Paola Loboa, Karla Vélez, Rosana Palacios, Nahomy Castro	3:36.56	SB
16	2	Botswana	Motlatsi Tebalo Rante, Galefele Moroko, Murangi Refilwe, Christine Botlogetswe	3:38.33	
17	2	Kenya	Joan Cherono, Diana Chebet, Vanice Kerubo Nyagisera, Rahab Wanjriu Ndirangu	3:43.22	
	1	Dominican Republic		DNS	

=== Final ===
The final was started on 5 May 2024 on 22:13.

Rank	Lane	Nation	Athletes	Time	Notes
1st place, gold medalist(s)	6	United States	Quanera Hayes, Gabrielle Thomas, Bailey Lear, Alexis Holmes	3:21.70	WL
2nd place, silver medalist(s)	7	Poland	Marika Popowicz-Drapała, Iga Baumgart-Witan, Justyna Święty-Ersetic, Natalia Kaczmarek	3:24.71	SB
3rd place, bronze medalist(s)	1	Canada	Zoe Sherar, Aiyanna Stiverne, Alyssa Marsh, Kyra Constantine	3:25.17	SB
4	8	United Kingdom	Victoria Ohuruogu, Lina Nielsen, Emily Newnham, Hannah Kelly	3:25.84	
5	3	Norway	Josefine Tomine Eriksen, Amalie Iuel, Elisabeth Slettum, Henriette Jaeger	3:26.88	NR
6	4	Italy	Rebecca Borga, Ayomide Folorunso, Virginia Troiani, Giancarla Trevisan	3:27.51	
7	5	Ireland	Phil Healy, Róisín Harrison, Lauren Cadden, Sophie Becker	3:30.95	
8	2	France	Estelle Raffai Gouanindji, Marjorie Veyssiere, Diana Iscaye, Sounkamba Sylla	3:30.96	
