= 2022 World Athletics Championships – Women's 4 × 400 metres relay =

Women's 4 × 400 metres relay at the 2022 World Athletics Championships
- Venue: Hayward Field
- Location: Eugene, Oregon, United States
- Dates: 23 July 2022 (round 1); 24 July 2022 (final)
- Teams: 15 nations
- Winning time: 3:17.79 min

Medalists
gold medal	Talitha Diggs; Abby Steiner (Note: This athlete ran in the final only.); Britton Wilson; Sydney McLaughlin; Allyson Felix (Note: This athlete ran in round 1 only.); Kaylin Whitney; Jaide Stepter Baynes	United States
silver medal	Candice McLeod; Janieve Russell; Stephenie Ann McPherson; Charokee Young; Stacey-Ann Williams; Junelle Bromfield; Tiffany James	Jamaica
bronze medal	Victoria Ohuruogu; Nicole Yeargin; Jessie Knight; Laviai Nielsen; Ama Pipi	Great Britain and Northern Ireland

The women's 4 × 400 metres relay at the 2022 World Athletics Championships was held over two rounds at the Hayward Field in Eugene, Oregon, United States, on 23 and 24 July 2022. It was the eighteenth time this event had been contested at the World Athletics Championships. Sixteen national teams could qualify at the 2021 World Relays or through their ranking.

Fifteen national teams eventually competed in round 1, where eight teams qualified for the final, which was won by the team of the United States in 3:17.79 minutes, followed by the Jamaican team in second place in 3:20.74 min and the British team in third place in 3:22.64 min.

== Background ==
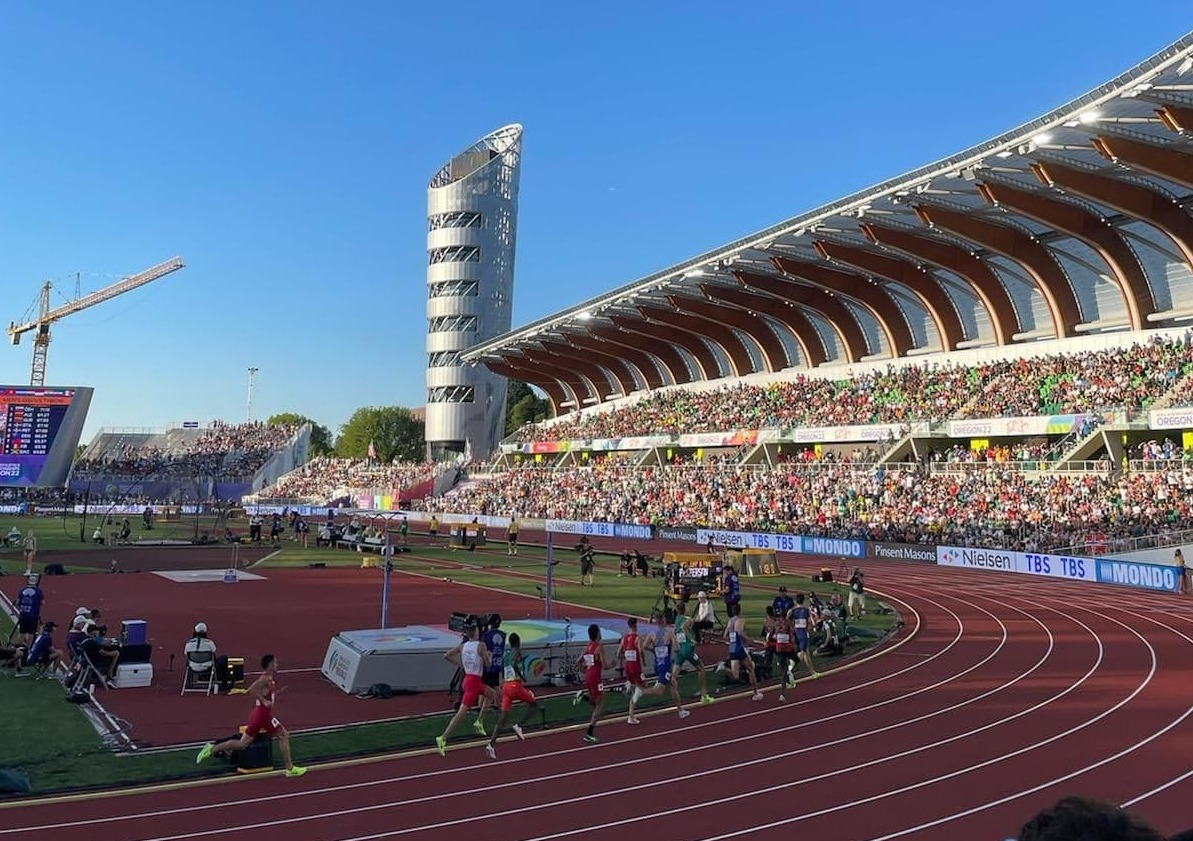
Hayward Field in July 2022

In the women's 4 × 400 metres relay, a team consists of four female athletes who consecutively run a lap on a 400-metre track while passing a baton between them. The world championship for this event was introduced in 1983 and had been contested seventeen times at the World Athletics Championships before 2022.

At the start of the 2022 championships, the team of Soviet Union held the world record of 3:15.17 min set during the 1988 Summer Olympics in Seoul, South Korea, the team of the United States held the championship record of 3.16.71 min set during the 1993 World Championships in Stuttgard, Germany, and the team of the Kentucky Wildcats from the United States had the world leading performance of the 2022 season until then of 3:21.93 min set during the 2022 Southeastern Conference Championship in Oxford, Mississippi, United States.

Global records before the 2022 World Athletics Championships
Record	Nation (athletes)	Time	Location	Date
World record	Soviet Union (Tatyana Ledovskaya, Olga Nazarova, Mariya Pinigina, Olga Bryzgina)	3:15.17	Seoul, South Korea	1 October 1988
Championship record	United States (Gwen Torrence, Maicel Malone, Natasha Kaiser, Jearl Miles Clark)	3:16.71	Stuttgart, Germany	22 August 1993
World leading	(United States) Kentucky Wildcats (Karimah Davis, Dajour Miles, Abby Steiner, Alexis Holmes)	3:21.93	Oxford, Mississippi, United States	14 May 2022

Area records before the 2022 World Athletics Championships
Record	Nation (athletes)	Time	Location	Date
African record	Nigeria (Olabisi Afolabi, Fatimat Yusuf, Charity Opara, Falilat Ogunkoya)	3:21.04	Atlanta, Georgia, United States	3 August 1996
Asian record	(China) Hebei (Bai Xiaoyun, Cao Chunying, Ma Yuqin, An Xiaohong)	3:24.28	Beijing, China	13 September 1993
European record	Soviet Union (Tatyana Ledovskaya, Olga Nazarova, Mariya Pinigina, Olga Bryzgina)	3:15.17 WR	Seoul, South Korea	1 October 1988
North, Central American and Caribbean record	United States (Denean Howard, Diane Dixon, Valerie Brisco-Hooks, Florence Griffith Joyner)	3:15.51	Seoul, South Korea	1 October 1988
Oceanian record	Australia (Nova Peris-Kneebone, Tamsyn Manou, Melinda Gainsford-Taylor, Cathy Freeman)	3:23.81	Sydney, Australia	30 September 2000
South American record	Tropic Thunder	3:26.33	Gainesville, Florida, United States	3 April 2010

== Qualification ==
The standard to qualify automatically for entry was to finish in the first ten at 2021 World Relays, completed by six top lists' teams.

== Results ==
=== Round 1 ===
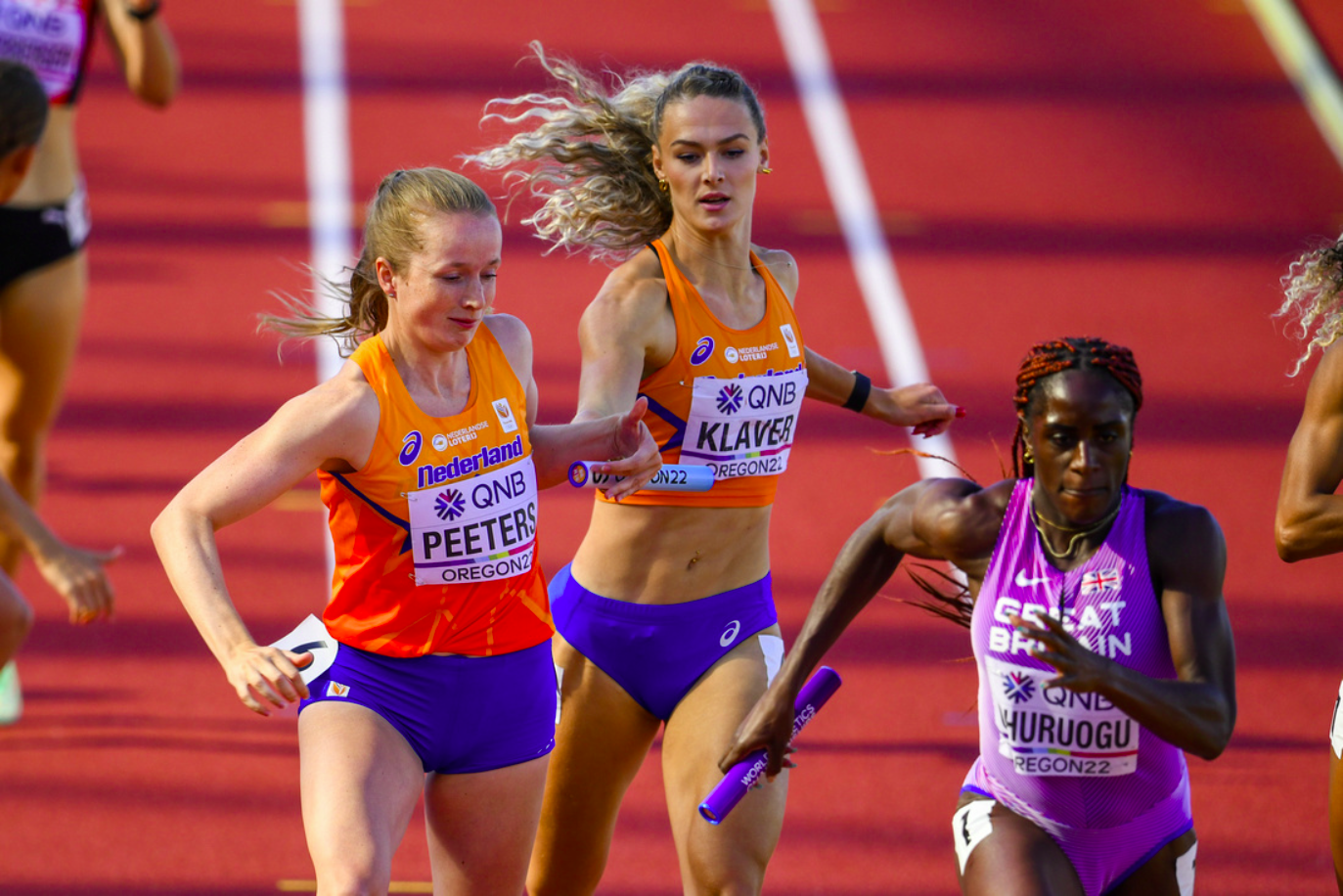
Cathelijn Peeters (left) receiving the baton from Lieke Klaver (center) and Victoria Ohuruogu (right) during the first heat of round 1

Fifteen national teams competed in the two heats of round 1 on 23 July, starting at 17:11 (UTC−7) in the afternoon. The first three teams in each heat (Q) and the next two fastest teams overall (q) qualified for the final. In the first heat, five teams had a season's best time (SB) and the team of the Netherlands was disqualified (DQ) for a fault at recovering a dropped baton (TR24.6). In the second heat, four teams had a season's best time (SB) and the team of The Bahamas did not start (DNS).

Results of round 1
Rank	Heat	Lane	Nation	Athletes	Time	Notes
1	1	2	United States	Talitha Diggs, Allyson Felix, Kaylin Whitney, Jaide Stepter Baynes	3:23.38	Q, SB
2	1	1	Great Britain & N.I.	Ama Pipi, Laviai Nielsen, Victoria Ohuruogu, Nicole Yeargin	3:23.92	Q, SB
3	2	8	Jamaica	Stacey-Ann Williams, Junelle Bromfield, Tiffany James, Charokee Young	3:24.23	Q, SB
4	2	2	Belgium	Naomi Van den Broeck, Imke Vervaet, Helena Ponette, Camille Laus	3:28.02	Q, SB
5	2	6	Canada	Micha Powell, Aiyanna Stiverne, Kyra Constantine, Natassha McDonald	3:28.49	Q, SB
6	2	4	Italy	Anna Polinari, Ayomide Folorunso, Virginia Troiani, Alice Mangione	3:28.72	q, SB
7	1	3	France	Sokhna Lacoste, Shana Grebo, Sounkamba Sylla, Amandine Brossier	3:28.89	Q, SB
8	1	8	Switzerland	Silke Lemmens, Julia Niederberger, Annina Fahr, Yasmin Giger	3:29.11	q, SB
9	1	7	Ukraine	Kateryna Karpyuk, Anastasiya Bryzhina, Viktoriya Tkachuk, Anna Ryzhykova	3:29.25	SB
10	2	7	Poland	Justyna Święty-Ersetic, Iga Baumgart-Witan, Kinga Gacka, Małgorzata Hołub-Kowalik	3:29.34	
11	1	4	Germany	Corinna Schwab, Elisa Lechleitner, Judith Franzen, Alica Schmidt	3:30.48	
12	2	1	Norway	Astri Ertzgaard, Elisabeth Slettum, Linn Oppegaard, Amalie Iuel	3:32.00	
13	2	3	Spain	Eva Santidrián, Aauri Lorena Bokesa, Laura Hernández, Carmen Avilés	3:32.87	
14	1	5	South Africa	Miranda Charlene Coetzee, Marlie Viljoen, Gontse Martha Morake, Zenéy van der Walt	3:46.68	
	1	6	Netherlands	Hanneke Oosterwegel, Lieke Klaver, Cathelijn Peeters, Femke Bol	DQ	TR24.6
	2	5	Bahamas		DNS	

=== Final ===
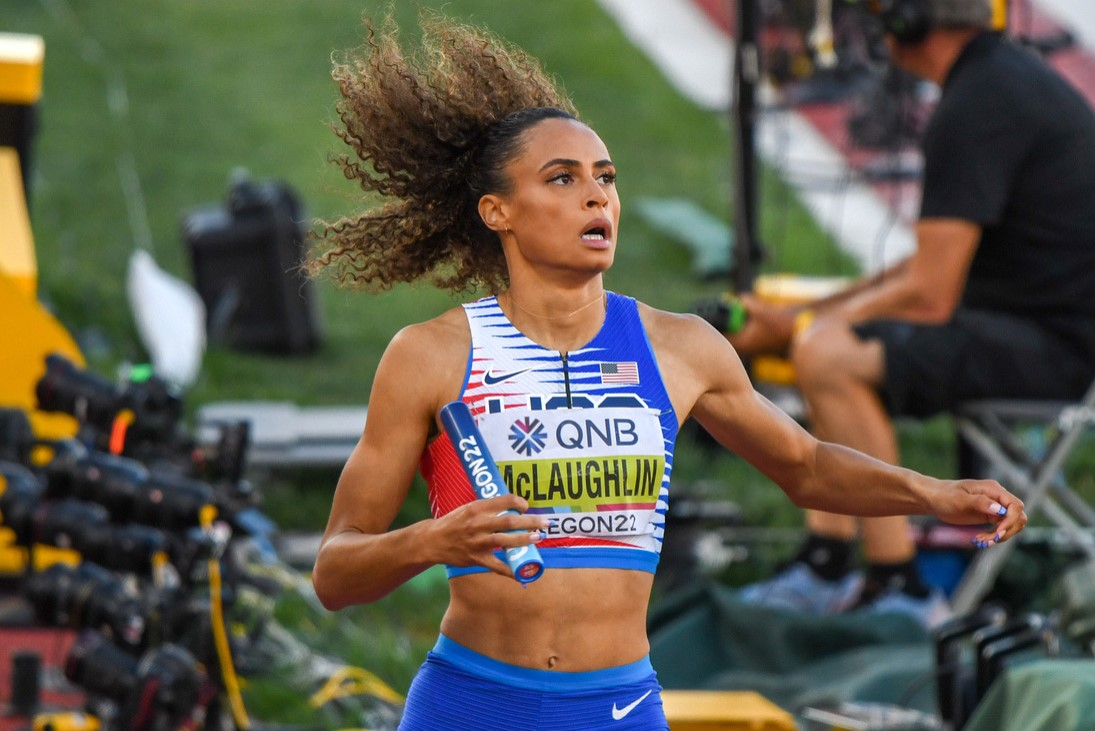
Sydney McLaughlin of the United States finished first in the final.

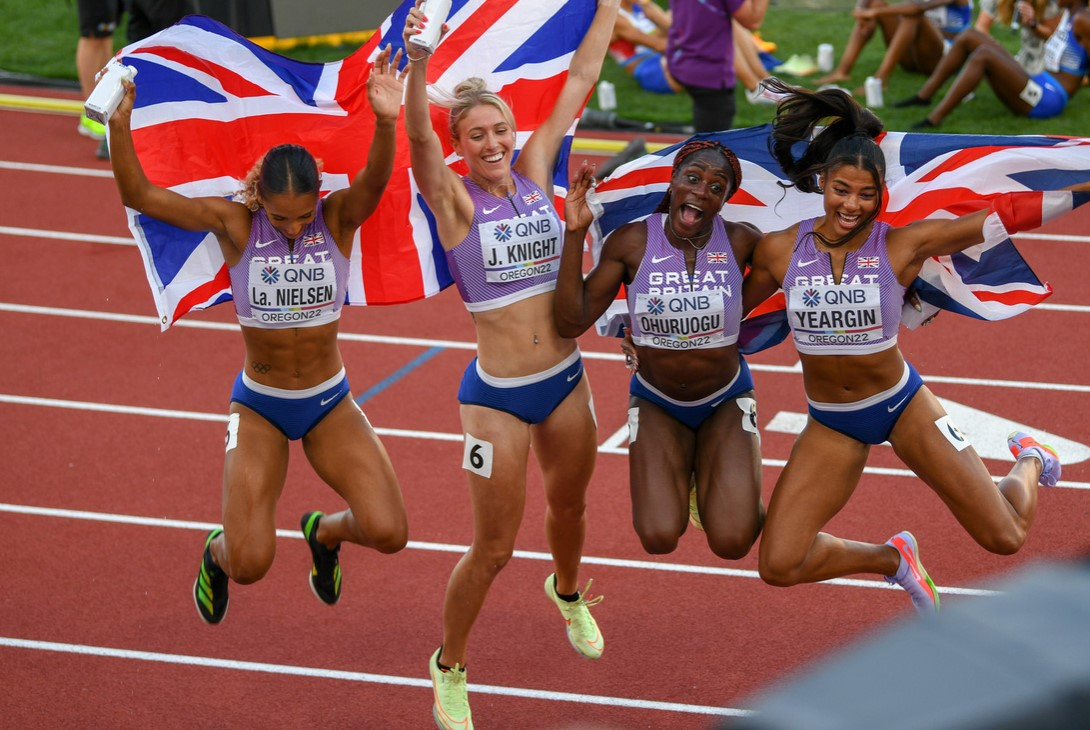
The team of Great Britain and Northern Ireland after they finished third in the final

Eight national teams competed in the final at 19:53 (UTC−7) on 24 July. At the end of the first leg, Talitha Diggs of the United States was the first to hand over de baton, followed by Victoria Ohuruogu of Great Britain and Northern Ireland and Candice McLeod of Jamaica. At the end of the second leg, Abby Steiner of the United States had kept her nation in the lead, but Janieve Russell of Jamaica had moved from third to second position and Nicole Yeargin of Great Britain and Northern Ireland had moved from second to third. In the third and fourth leg, the Britton Wilson and Sydney McLaughlin of the United States stayed in first position at the changeovers, Stephenie Ann McPherson and Charokee Young of Jamaica stayed in second position, and Jessie Knight and Laviai Nielsen of Great Britain and Northern Ireland stayed in third position. The race was won by the team of the United States in a world leading time (WL) of 3:17.79 min, followed by the Jamaican team in second place in 3:20.74 min and the British team in third place in 3:22.64 min. All teams that competed in the final had a season's best time (SB). The fastest split time was 47.91 s by McLaughlin.

Results of the final
Rank	Lane	Nation	Athletes	Time	Notes
1st place, gold medalist(s)	5	United States	Talitha Diggs, Abby Steiner, Britton Wilson, Sydney McLaughlin	3:17.79	WL
2nd place, silver medalist(s)	4	Jamaica	Candice McLeod, Janieve Russell, Stephenie Ann McPherson, Charokee Young	3:20.74	SB
3rd place, bronze medalist(s)	6	Great Britain & N.I.	Victoria Ohuruogu, Nicole Yeargin, Jessie Knight, Laviai Nielsen	3:22.64	SB
4	7	Canada	Natassha McDonald, Aiyanna Stiverne, Zoe Sherar, Kyra Constantine	3:25.18	SB
5	8	France	Sokhna Lacoste, Shana Grebo, Sounkamba Sylla, Amandine Brossier	3:25.81	SB
6	3	Belgium	Helena Ponette, Imke Vervaet, Paulien Couckuyt, Camille Laus	3:26.29	SB
7	2	Italy	Anna Polinari, Ayomide Folorunso, Virginia Troiani, Alice Mangione	3:26.45	SB
8	1	Switzerland	Silke Lemmens, Julia Niederberger, Annina Fahr, Yasmin Giger	3:27.81	SB
