= Camille Laus =

Belgian sprinter (born 1993)

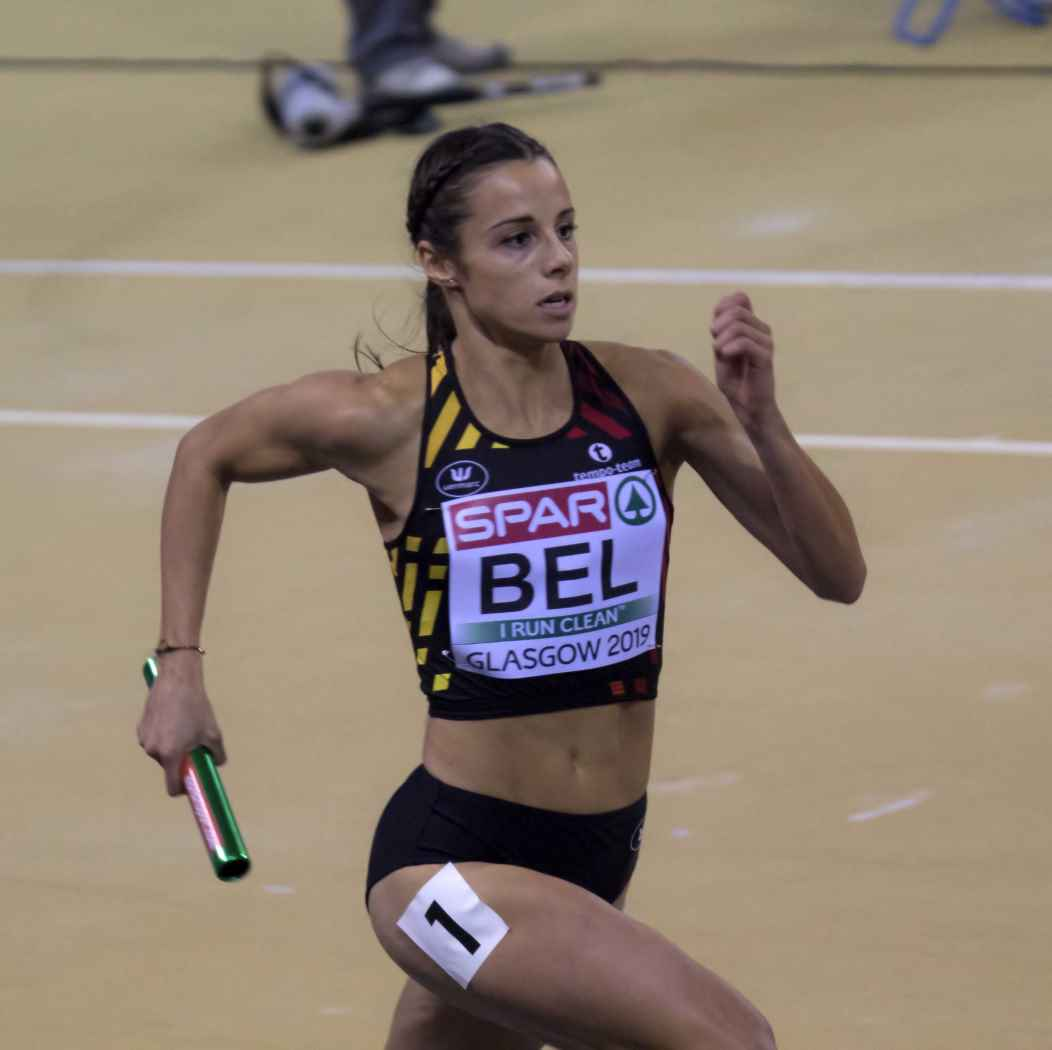
- Camille Laus in 2019

Personal information
- Nationality: Belgian
- Born: 23 May 1993 (age 33)

Sport
- Sport: Athletics
- Event: Sprinting

Achievements and titles
- Personal bests: 400 m – 51.49 (2018); 800 m – 1:59.43 (2026)
Medal record
Representing Belgium
European Championships
Bronze medal – third place	2024 Rome	4×400 m relay
European Games
Bronze medal – third place	2023 Kraków-Małopolska	4×400 m mixed

Camille Laus (born 23 May 1993) is a Belgian athlete sprinter. She ran in the national team which placed 5th in the 4 × 400 m relay at the 2019 World Championships, setting Belgian record of 3:26.58 sec in the heats.

Laus also competed in the 4 × 400 m mixed relay event at the 2019 World Championships, where Belgian team placed 6th with the national record time of 3:14.22 s.

Originally a 400 metres runner, Laus announced in 2023 that she would switch to the 800 metres while remaining available as a member of Belgium's 400 metres relay teams.

In 2024, at the World Athletics Relays in The Bahamas, she was on the teams that qualified Belgium for the 4 × 400 metres mixed relay and the women's 4 × 400 metres relay at the 2024 Summer Olympic Games in Paris, France. And later that same year, she was on the Belgian 4 x 400 metres women's relay team that won a bronze medal at the European Athletics Championships having anchored the team in the first round of the competition. At the 2024 Summer Olympic Games, she ran in the heats of the women's 4 × 400 metres relay qualifying the Belgium team for the final. In that final, she was replaced by Naomi Van den Broeck

In November 2024, Laus announced that she was leaving Jacques Borlée's training group in Belgium and was to join Tom Nohilly's training group in Atlanta, United States to focus on the 800 metres, setting as first major goal trying to qualify for the 2025 World Athletics Championships in September 2025 in Tokyo, Japan. In August 2025, she came close to meeting the required entry time of 1:59.00 for the 800 metres, setting a personal best of 1:59.50 at the TIPOS P-T-S Meeting in Banská Bystrica, Slovakia but ultimately failed to qualifiy. She did go the Championships though as a member of Belgium women's 4 x 400 metres relay team and ran in both the heats and the final where Belgium's team finished fourth.

A year later, in August 2026, Laus participated at her first European Athletics Championships as an 800 metres runner. At the 2026 European Athletics Championships in Birmingham, United Kingdom, she was eliminated in the series but set a new personal best of 1:59.43. She also took part in the women's 4 × 400 metres relay running in both the series and the final where the Belgium team finished sixth.

== Achievements ==
=== International competitions ===
Year	Competition	Venue	Position	Event	Notes
Representing Belgium
2009	Olympic Youth Festival	Tampere, Finland	6th	100 m	12.16
2009	Olympic Youth Festival	Tampere, Finland	4th	4 × 100 m relay	46.87
2011	European Junior Championships	Tallinn, Estonia	5th	4 × 100 m	45.15
2012	World Junior Championships	Barcelona, Spain	5th	4 × 100 m	45.12
2015	European Athletics Team Championships, First League	Heraklion, Greece	6th	100 m	12.17
2015	European Athletics Team Championships, First League	Heraklion, Greece	6th	200 m	24.63
2015	European Athletics Team Championships, First League	Heraklion, Greece	2nd	4 × 100 m relay	44.95
2017	European Athletics Team Championships, First League	Vaasa, Finland	4th	100 m	12.07
2017	European Athletics Team Championships, First League	Vaasa, Finland	2nd	4 × 100 m relay	45.15
2017	European Athletics Team Championships, First League	Vaasa, Finland	3rd	4 × 400 m relay	3:38.80
2018	European Championships	Berlin, Germany	21st (sf)	400 m	52.40
2018	European Championships	Berlin, Germany	4th	4 × 400 m relay	3:27.49
2019	European Indoor Championships	Glasgow, United Kingdom	5th	4 × 400 m relay sh	3:32.46
2019	World Relays	Yokohama, Japan	1st (h)	Mixed 4 × 400 m relay	3:18.03^{1}
2019	World Relays	Yokohama, Japan	2nd (final B)	4 × 400 m relay	3:31.71
2019	European Athletics Team Championships, First League	Sandnes, Norway	6th	400 m	53.69
2019	European Athletics Team Championships, First League	Sandnes, Norway	5th (final B)	4 × 400 m relay	3:37.57
2019	World Championships	Doha, Qatar	6th	Mixed 4 × 400 m relay	3:14.22
2019	World Championships	Doha, Qatar	5th	4 × 400 m relay	3:27.15
2021	European Indoor Championships	Toruń, Poland	32nd (h)	400 m sh	53.68
2021	World Relays	Chorzów, Poland	4th	Mixed 4 × 400 m relay	3:17.92
2021	World Relays	Chorzów, Poland	7th	4 × 400 m relay	3:37.66
2021	Olympic Games	Tokyo, Japan	5th	Mixed 4 × 400 m relay	3:11.51
2021	Olympic Games	Tokyo, Japan	7th	4 × 400 m relay	3:23.96
2022	World Indoor Championships	Belgrade	11th (h)	400 m	52.51
2022	World Indoor Championships	Belgrade	6th	4 × 400 m relay	3:33.61
2022	European Championships	Munich, Germany	24th (sf)	400 m	54.28
2022	European Championships	Munich, Germany	4th	4 × 400 m relay	3:22.12
2022	World Championships	Eugene, United States	10th (h)	Mixed 4 × 400 m relay	3:16.01
2022	World Championships	Eugene, United States	31st (h)	400 m	52.56
2022	World Championships	Eugene, United States	6th	4 × 400 m relay	3:26.29
2023	European Indoor Championships	Istanbul, Turkey	12th (h)	400 m sh	53.10
2023	European Team Championships, First Division	Chorzów, Poland	1st (final B)	800 m	2:02.28
2023	European Team Championships, First Division	Chorzów, Poland	2nd (final B)	Mixed 4 × 400 m relay	3:12.97
2023	World Championships	Budapest, Hungary	5th	Mixed 4 × 400 m relay	3:11.81
2023	World Championships	Budapest, Hungary	5th	4 × 400 m relay	3:22.84
2024	World Indoor Championships	Glasgow, Scotland	4th	4 × 400 m relay	3:28.05
2024	World Relays	Nassau, The Bahamas	− (f)	Mixed 4 × 400 m relay	DQ
2024	World Relays	Nassau, The Bahamas	1st (r)	4 × 400 m relay	3:26.79
2024	European Championships	Rome, Italy	3rd (h)	4 × 400 m relay	3:25.16^{1}
2024	Olympic Games	Paris, France	4th (h)	4 × 400 m relay	3:24.92^{1}
2025	World Relays	Guangzhou, China	2nd (r)	4 × 400 m relay	3:24.52
2025	World Championships	Tokyo, Japan	4th	4 × 400 m relay	3:22.15
2026	World Relays	Gaborone, Botswana	2nd (r)	Mixed 4 × 400 m relay	3:12.79
2026	World Relays	Gaborone, Botswana	6th (r)	4 × 400 m relay	3:32.06
2026	European Championships	Birmingham, United Kingdom	17th (h)	800 m	1:59.43
2026	European Championships	Birmingham, United Kingdom	6th	4 × 400 m relay	3:25.19

^{1}Time from the heats; Laus was replaced in the final.
