= Jessica Wright (sprinter) =

American athlete

Personal information
- Nationality: American
- Born: March 26, 2000 (age 26)

Sport
- Sport: Athletics
- Event(s): 400 metres, 400 metres hurdles

Achievements and titles
- Personal best(s): 400m: 52.34 (Gainesville, 2023); 400m hurdles: 55.81 (Gainesville, 2023)
Medal record
Women's athletics
Representing United States
World Indoor Championships
| Silver medal – second place | 2024 Glasgow | 4×400 m relay |

Jessica Wright (born March 26, 2000) is an American track and field athlete who competes in the hurdles and as a sprinter.

== Early life ==
From Durham, North Carolina she attended Hillside School and Howard University. Wright was named the Mid-Eastern Athletic Conference Indoor & Outdoor Champion for the 2021–22 season.

== Career ==
She finished fifth at the 2024 USA Indoor Track and Field Championships in New Mexico in the 400 metres.

She was selected for the 2024 World Athletics Indoor Championships in Glasgow as part of the 4 × 400 m relay team. She was part of the quartet which qualified for the final, where they finished in the silver medal position.

In April 2024, she was selected as part of the American team for the 2024 World Athletics Relays in Nassau, Bahamas.

She qualified for the final of the 400 metres hurdles at the 2025 USA Outdoor Track and Field Championships, placing fifth overall in 55.81 seconds.
