= Alyssa Marsh =

Canadian sprinter (born 2000)

Personal information
- Born: 21 December 2000 (age 25)

Sport
- Sport: Athletics
- Event: Sprint

Achievements and titles
- Personal best: 400 m: 51.62 s (2023)
Medal record
Women's athletics
Representing Canada
World Athletics Relays
Bronze medal – third place	2024 Nassau	4×400 m relay

Alyssa Marsh (born 21 December 2000) is a Canadian sprinter. She predominantly competes over 400 metres. She has competed for Canada internationally in the 4 x 400 metres relay.

== Biography ==
Marsh started out in athletics whilst attending Terry Fox Public School in Canada, and later educated at Notre Dame Catholic Secondary School in Ajax, Ontario. She was then educated in the United States at Ohio State University.

A member of Durham Legion Athletics club, she competed at the Ontario Federation of Schools Athletic Association track and field championships in 2018 at York University, where she finished second in the senior girls' 400 metres and less than an hour later placed third in the 100 metres before also placing third in the 200 metres the following day. The following month, Marsh was the Canadian under-20 women's 400 metres champion at the 2018 Canadian Outdoor Track and Field Championships in July 2018.

She was a member of the Ohio State Buckeyes team which set a programme record for the 4 x 400 metres relay at the Penn Relays in 2023.

She ran as part of the Canadian women's 4 × 400 m relay team which won the bronze medal at the 2024 World Relays Championships in Nassau, The Bahamas, alongside Zoe Sherar, Aiyanna Stiverne, and Kyra Constantine.

She was selected for the Canadian relay pool for the 2025 World Athletics Relays in China in May 2025. She was subsequently named in the Canadian team for the 2025 World Athletics Championships in Tokyo, Japan. She ran on the opening day in the mixed 4 × 400 metres relay. She also ran in the women's x 400 metres relay.
