= Iga Baumgart-Witan =

Polish sprinter (born 1989)

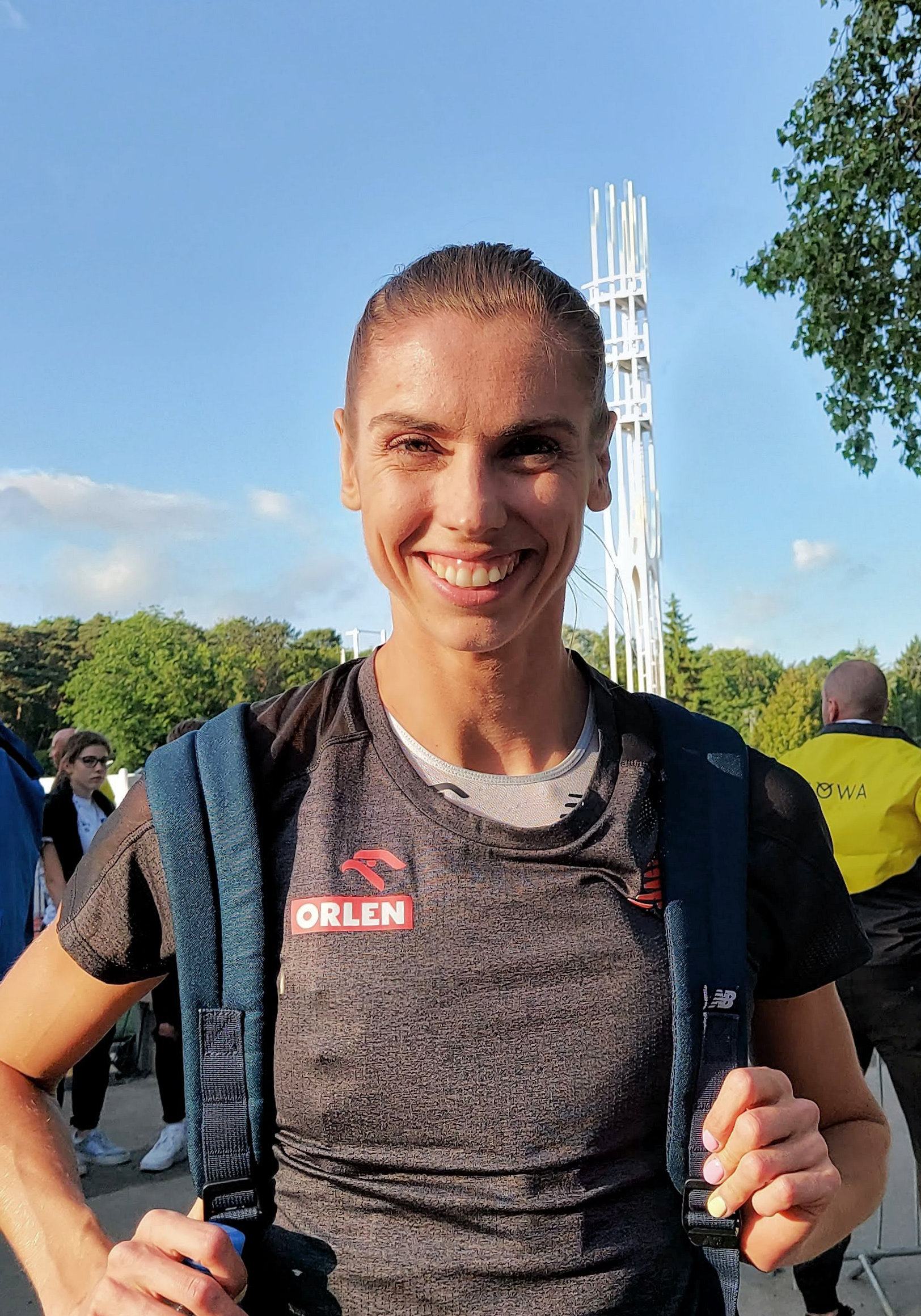
- Baumgart-Witan in 2021

Personal information
- Born: 11 April 1989 (age 37) Bydgoszcz, Poland
- Education: Kazimierz Wielki University
- Height: 1.78 m (5 ft 10 in)
- Weight: 55 kg (121 lb)

Sport
- Country: Poland
- Sport: Athletics
- Event: Sprinting
- Club: BKS Bydgoszcz
- Coached by: Iwona Baumgart

Achievements and titles
- Personal best: 400 m: 51.02 (2019)
Medal record
Women's athletics
Representing Poland
Olympic Games
Gold medal – first place	2020 Tokyo	4 × 400 m mixed
Silver medal – second place	2020 Tokyo	4 × 400 m relay
World Championships
Silver medal – second place	2019 Doha	4 × 400 m relay
Bronze medal – third place	2017 London	4 × 400 m relay
World Indoor Championships
Bronze medal – third place	2022 Belgrade	4 × 400 m relay
World Relays
Silver medal – second place	2024 Nassau	4 × 400 m relay
European Championships
Gold medal – first place	2018 Berlin	4 × 400 m relay
Silver medal – second place	2022 Munich	4 × 400 m relay
European Indoor Championships
Gold medal – first place	2017 Belgrade	4 × 400 m relay
Gold medal – first place	2019 Glasgow	4 × 400 m relay
European Team Championships
Gold medal – first place	2019 Bydgoszcz	4 × 400 m relay

Iga Baumgart-Witan (born 11 April 1989) is a Polish sprinter specialising in the 400 metres. She won several medals at major championships as part of Polish 4 × 400 metres relays, including a gold in the mixed relay and a silver in the women's relay at the 2020 Tokyo Olympics.

Baumgart-Witan represented Poland in relays at the 2012 London and 2016 Rio Olympics as well as at five World Championships. She won three Polish national titles.

== Competition record ==
Representing Poland
Year	Competition	Venue	Position	Event	Notes
2007	European Junior Championships	Hengelo, Netherlands	12th (h)	400 m	54.69
2007	European Junior Championships	Hengelo, Netherlands	5th	4 × 400 m relay	3:39.26
2009	European U23 Championships	Kaunas, Lithuania	18th (h)	400 m	54.97
2009	European U23 Championships	Kaunas, Lithuania	6th	4 × 400 m relay	3:33.49
2011	European U23 Championships	Ostrava, Czech Republic	18th (h)	400 m	54.53
2011	European U23 Championships	Ostrava, Czech Republic	4th	4 × 400 m relay	3:36.42
2012	European Championships	Helsinki, Finland	8th	4 × 400 m relay	3:30.17
2012	Olympic Games	London, United Kingdom	13th (h)	4 × 400 m relay	3:30.15
2013	World Championships	Moscow, Russia	9th (h)	4 × 400 m relay	3:29.75
2014	European Championships	Zürich, Switzerland	5th (h)	4 × 400 m relay	3:29.79
2015	World Championships	Beijing, China	28th (h)	400 m	52.02
2016	European Championships	Amsterdam, Netherlands	2nd (h)	4 × 400 m relay	3:27.72
2016	Olympic Games	Rio de Janeiro, Brazil	7th	4 × 400 m relay	3:27.28
2017	European Indoor Championships	Belgrade, Serbia	14th (sf)	400 m i	53.76
2017	European Indoor Championships	Belgrade, Serbia	1st	4 × 400 m relay i	3:29.94
2017	IAAF World Relays	Nassau, Bahamas	2nd	4 × 400 m relay	3:28.28
2017	World Championships	London, United Kingdom	15th (sf)	400 m	51.81
2017	World Championships	London, United Kingdom	3rd	4 × 400 m relay	3:25.41
2017	Universiade	Taipei, Taiwan	6th	400 m	52.46
2017	Universiade	Taipei, Taiwan	1st	4 × 400 m relay	3:26.75
2018	European Championships	Berlin, Germany	5th	400 m	51.24
2018	European Championships	Berlin, Germany	1st	4 × 400 m relay	3:26.59
2019	European Indoor Championships	Glasgow, Scotland	16th (sf)	400 m i	53.83
2019	European Indoor Championships	Glasgow, Scotland	1st	4 × 400 m relay i	3:28.77
2019	European Team Championships Super League	Bydgoszcz, Poland	1st	4 × 400 m relay	3:24.81 EL
2019	World Championships	Doha, Qatar	8th	400 m	51.29
2019	World Championships	Doha, Qatar	2nd	4 × 400 m relay	3:21.89
2021	Olympic Games	Tokyo, Japan	2nd	4 × 400 m relay	3:20.53 NR
2021	Olympic Games	Tokyo, Japan	1st	4 × 400 m mixed	3:10.44 OR AR (Note: Time from the heats; Baumgart-Witan was replaced in the final.)
2022	World Indoor Championships	Belgrade, Serbia	3rd	4 × 400 m relay i	3:28.59
2022	World Championships	Eugene, OR, United States	10th (h)	4 × 400 m relay	3:29.34
2022	World Championships	Eugene, OR, United States	4th	4 × 400 m mixed	3:13.70
2022	European Championships	Munich, Germany	8th	400 m	51.28
2022	European Championships	Munich, Germany	2nd	4 × 400 m relay	3:21.68 SB
2024	World Relays	Nassau, Bahamas	6th (h)	4 × 400 m mixed	3:13.53 (Note: Time from the heats; The Polish team did not start in the final.)
2024	World Relays	Nassau, Bahamas	2nd	4 × 400 m relay	3:24.71
2024	European Championships	Rome, Italy	9th (h)	400 m	52.18
2024	European Championships	Rome, Italy	6th	4 × 400 m relay	3:23.91

== Personal bests ==
- 200 metres – 23.77 (+2.0 m/s, Gdańsk 2012)
  - 200 metres indoor – 24.48 (Spała 2022)
- 400 metres – 51.02 (Doha 2019)
  - 400 metres indoor – 51.91 (Toruń 2019)

Relays

- 4 × 400 metres relay – 3:20.53 (Tokyo 2021) NR
