= Eveline Saalberg =

Dutch sprinter (born 1998)

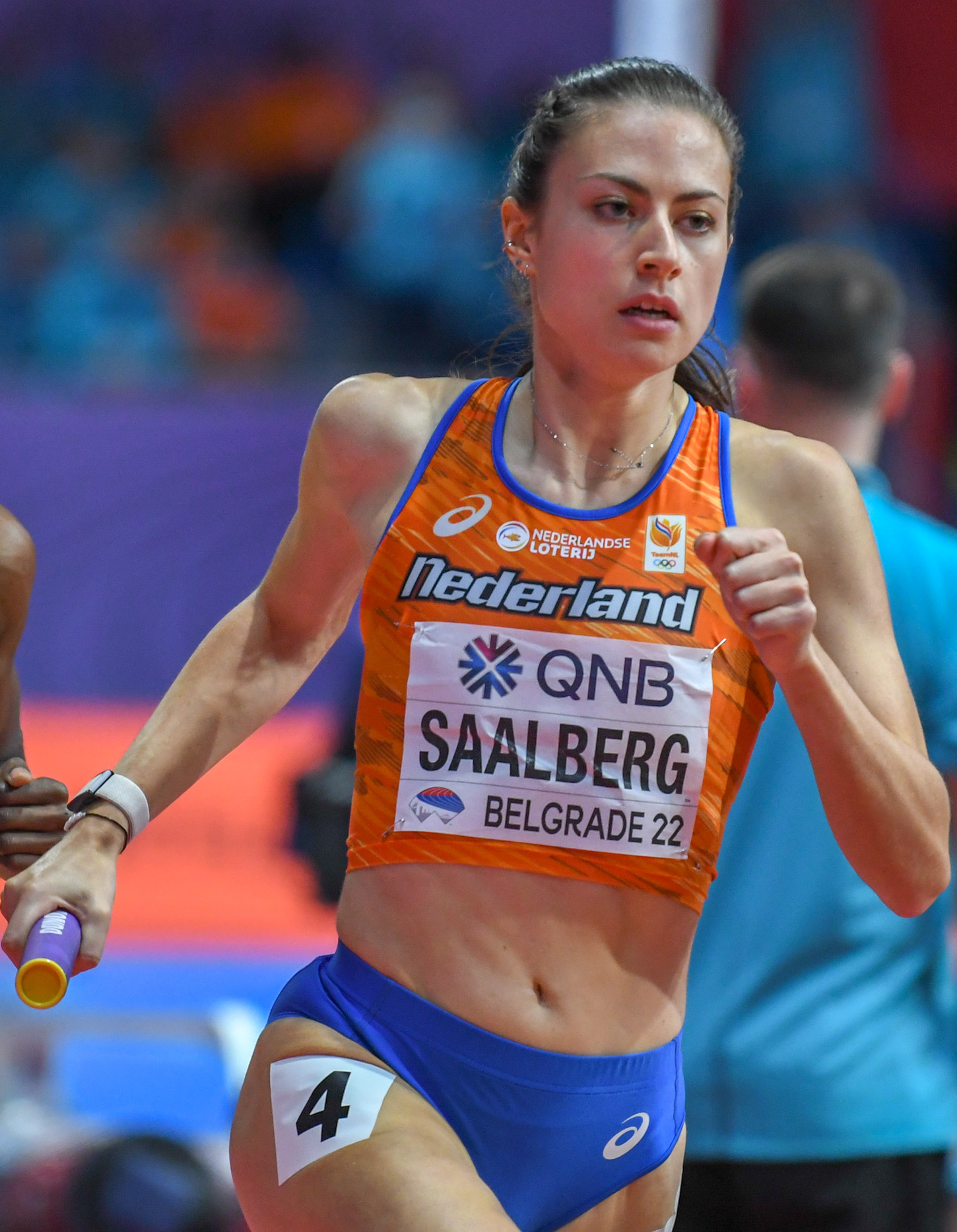
- Saalberg at the 2022 World Indoor Championships in Belgrade

Personal information
- Born: 30 July 1998 (age 28) Arnhem, Netherlands
- Height: 1.78 m (5 ft 10 in)

Sport
- Sport: Track and field
- Events: 400 m, 4 × 400 m relay
- Coached by: Laurent Meuwly (since 2019)

Achievements and titles
- Personal best: 400 m: 50.84 (2026)
Medal record
Women's athletics
Representing the Netherlands
Olympic Games
Silver medal – second place	2024 Paris	4 × 400 m relay
World Championships
Gold medal – first place	2023 Budapest	4 × 400 m relay
Silver medal – second place	2022 Eugene	4 × 400 m mixed
Silver medal – second place	2025 Tokyo	4 × 400 m mixed
Bronze medal – third place	2025 Tokyo	4 × 400 m relay
World Indoor Championships
Gold medal – first place	2024 Glasgow	4 × 400 m relay
Silver medal – second place	2022 Belgrade	4 × 400 m relay
Silver medal – second place	2026 Toruń	4 × 400 m relay
European Championships
Gold medal – first place	2022 Munich	4 × 400 m relay
Gold medal – first place	2024 Rome	4 × 400 m relay
Gold medal – first place	2026 Birmingham	4 × 400 m relay
European Indoor Championships
Gold medal – first place	2023 Istanbul	4 × 400 m relay
Gold medal – first place	2025 Apeldoorn	4 × 400 m mixed

Eveline Saalberg (pronounced [eːvəˈlinə ˈsaːlbɛr(ə)x]; born 30 July 1998) is a Dutch sprinter who specialises in the 400 metres.

As part of the Dutch women's and mixed 4 × 400 metres relay team, she won a silver medal at the 2024 Summer Olympics, a gold medal at the 2023 World Championships, three silver medals at the World Championships (outdoor and indoor), and four gold medals at the European Championships (outdoor and indoor). Individually, she won two gold medals, three silver medals, and one bronze medal at the Dutch Championships (outdoor and indoor).

== Early life ==
Eveline Saalberg was born on 30 July 1998 in Arnhem in the Netherlands.

At the age of eight, she started competing in athletics and became a member of the club GVAC in Veldhoven. In the youth categories she competed in, she won several medals at Dutch junior championships.

During her student days, Saalberg distinguished herself by becoming a multiple Dutch student champion. She combined all this with a board year as chair of the Student Athletics Association MSAV Uros.

== Senior career ==
=== 2019 ===
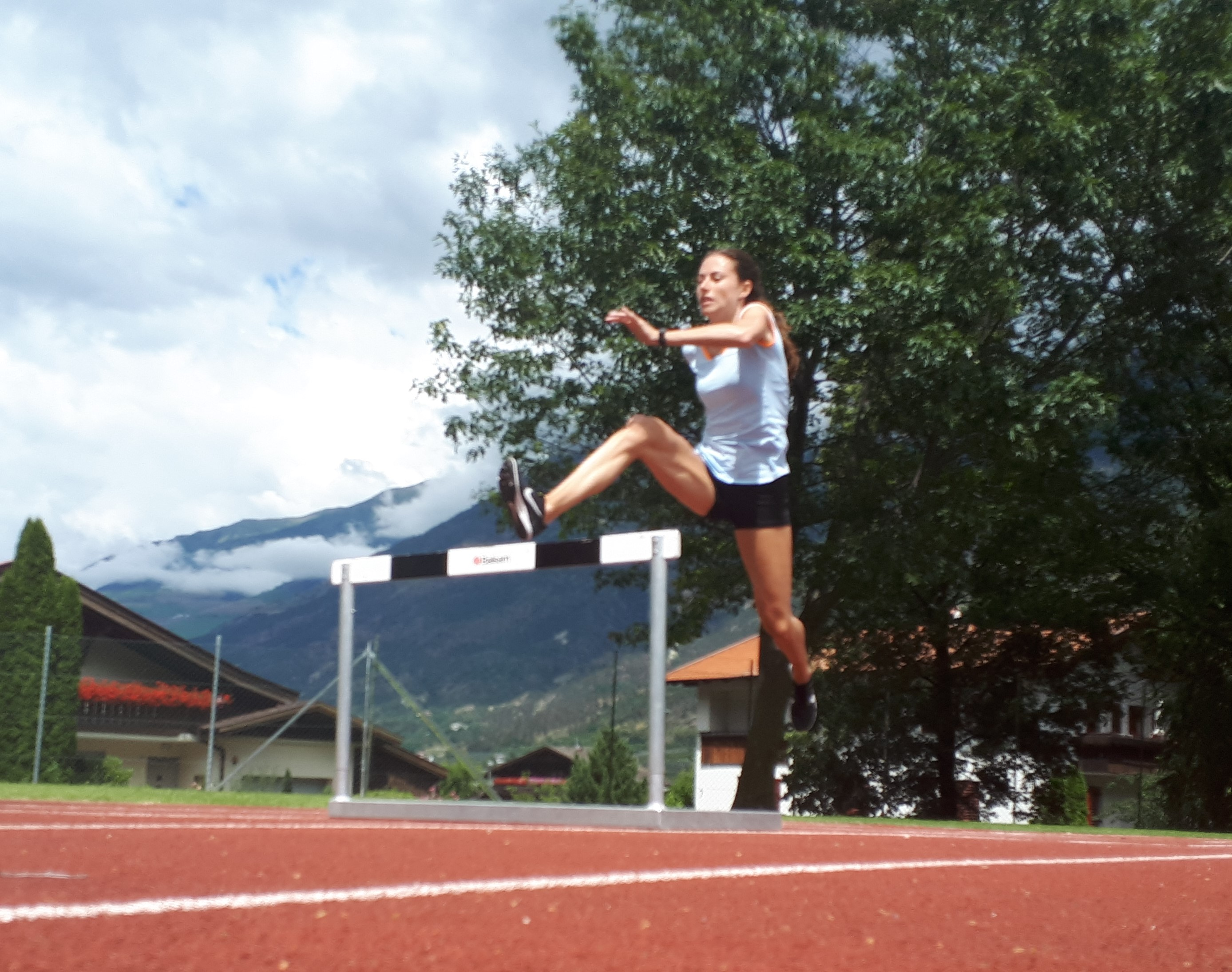
Saalberg during a training camp in South Tyrol in 2019

Saalberg experienced her breakthrough at the 2019 Dutch Athletics Championships in The Hague in July. Against expectations, she won the title in the 400 m hurdles there. She broke the minute barrier for the first time with a time of 58.86 s. Afterwards, she stated that on a training holiday in South Tyrol, she could fully focus on the technique of hurdling. In the autumn of 2019, Saalberg joined the training group of athletics coach Laurent Meuwly to train at the National Sports Centre Papendal alongside Eva Hovenkamp and Femke Bol.

=== 2020 ===
At the Dutch Indoor Championships in February 2020, Saalberg won the bronze medal in the 400 m at 53.65 s. At the Dutch Championships in August, she won the silver medal in the 400 m at 54.16 s.

=== 2021 ===
In May 2021, Saalberg competed at the World Athletics Relays as a member of the Netherlands team in the women's 4 × 400 metres relay and mixed 4 × 400 metres relay. In the women's relay, she ran in the heats, where the Netherlands finished fourth in the final. In the mixed relay, she ran in the final, where the Netherlands finished eighth.

=== 2022 ===
At the World Indoor Championships in March 2022, Saalberg competed in the heats and final of the women's 4 × 400 metres relay, and the Netherlands won the silver medal.

In July, she competed at the World Championships. In the mixed 4 × 400 metres relay, she ran in the heats, and the Netherlands won the silver medal in the final. In the women's 400 metres, she ran 52.59 s in the heats and did not advance to the semifinals.

In August, she competed at the European Championships. In the women's 400 metres, she ran 51.81 s in the heats to advance to the semifinals. She ran 52.45 s in the semifinals and did not advance to the final. In the women's 4 × 400 metres relay, she ran in the final, and the Netherlands won the gold medal.

=== 2023 ===
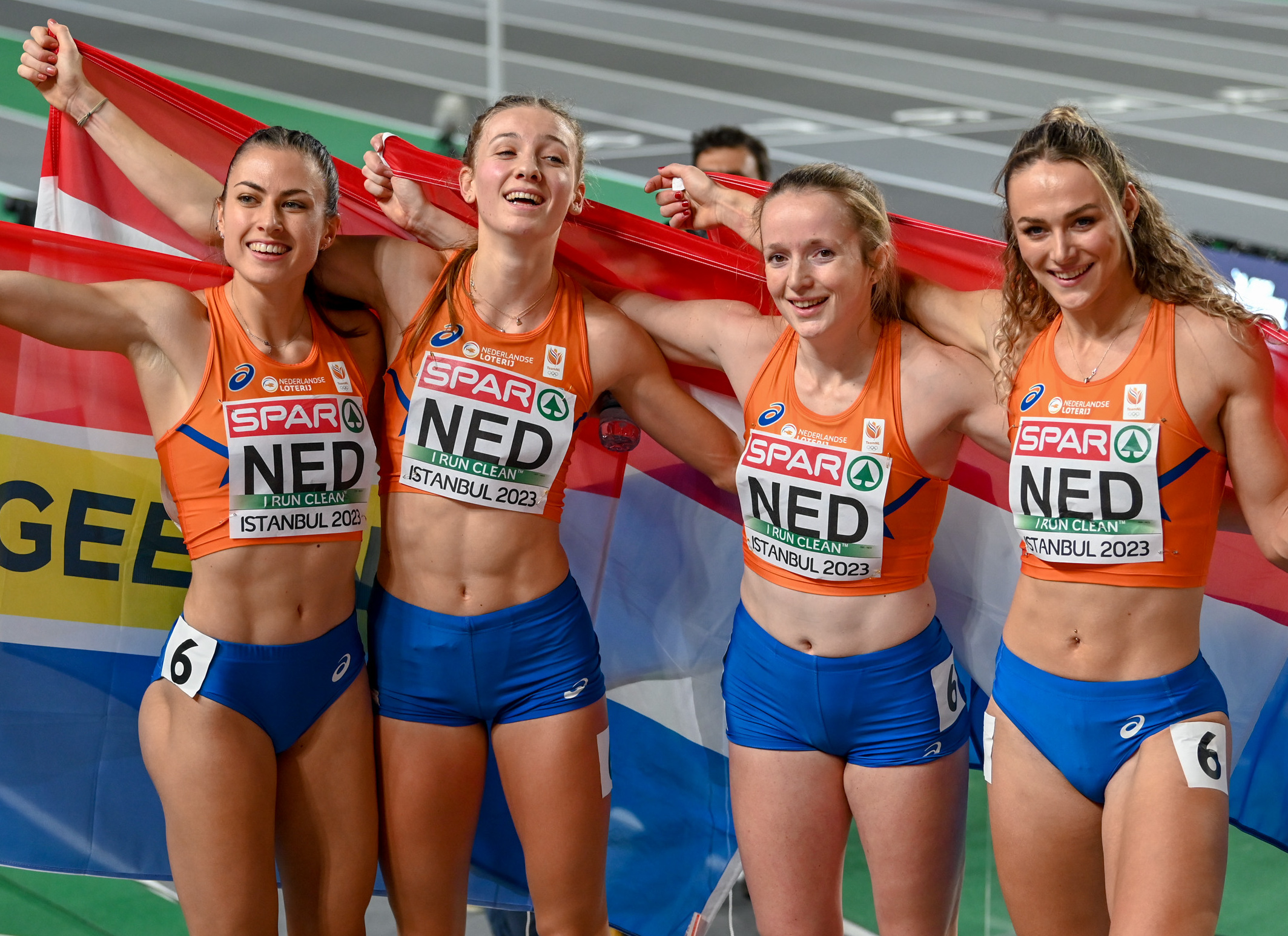
Saalberg (left) with the women's 4 × 400 metres relay team at the 2023 European Indoor Championships

At the European Indoor Championships in March 2023, Saalberg ran in the final of the women's 4 × 400 metres relay, where the Netherlands won the gold medal.

In August, she competed at the World Championships. She ran in the heats and final of the women's 4 × 400 metres relay, where the Netherlands won the gold medal.

=== 2024 ===
Saalberg competed at the World Indoor Championships in March 2024. She ran in the heats of the women's 4 × 400 metres relay, and the Netherlands won the gold medal in the final.

In May, she competed at the World Relays. She ran in the heats and repechage rounds of the women's 4 × 400 metres relay.

In June, she competed at the European Championships. She ran in the heats of the women's 4 × 400 metres relay, and the Netherlands won the gold medal in the final.

In August, she competed at the Olympic Games. She ran in the heats of the women's 4 × 400 metres relay, and the Netherlands won the silver medal in the final.

=== 2025 ===
Saalberg competed at the European Indoor Championships in March 2025. She ran in the final of the mixed 4 × 400 metres relay, and the Netherlands won the gold medal. In the women's 400 metres, she ran 52.93 s in the heats and did not advance to the semifinals.

In September, she competed at the World Championships. She ran in the heats of the mixed 4 × 400 metres relay, and the Netherlands won the silver medal in the final. In the women's 400 metres, she ran 51.73 s in the heats and did not advance to the semifinals. In the women's 4 × 400 metres relay, she ran in the heats and final, where the Netherlands won the bronze medal.

=== 2026 ===
In August at the European Championships, Saalberg was a member of the Netherlands team which won the gold medal in the women's 4 × 400 metres relay.

== Personal bests ==
Information from her World Athletics profile unless otherwise noted.

=== Individual events ===
Type	Event	Time	Location	Date
Outdoor	100 metres	11.80	Oordegem, Belgium	27 May 2023
Outdoor	150 metres	18.44	Lisse, Netherlands	18 May 2019
Outdoor	200 metres	23.39	La Chaux-de-Fonds, Switzerland	14 August 2021
Outdoor	300 metres	37.09	Leuven, Belgium	7 August 2021
Outdoor	400 metres	50.84	Birmingham, United Kingdom	13 August 2026
Outdoor	600 metres	1:26.46	Pliezhausen, Germany	18 May 2025
Outdoor	800 metres	2:00.30	Warsaw, Poland	7 June 2026
Outdoor	400 metres hurdles	58.86	The Hague, Netherlands	27 July 2019
Indoor	60 metres	7.75 i	Apeldoorn, Netherlands	28 January 2023
Indoor	200 metres short track	24.03 i	Metz, France	3 February 2024
Indoor	400 metres short track	52.21 i	Apeldoorn, Netherlands	22 February 2026
Indoor	800 metres short track	2:05.25 i	Ostrava, Czech Republic	3 February 2026

==== Season's bests ====
Year	200 m	200 m sh	400 m	400 m sh	800 m	800 m sh
2013	26.25	–	–	–	–	–
2014	–	–	–	58.10	–	–
2015	–	–	60.59	–	–	–
2016	–	26.97	–	60.16	–	–
2017	24.92	25.92	59.20	58.80	–	–
2018	24.88	–	56.64	58.74	–	–
2019	24.32	24.81	55.73	56.34	–	–
2020	–	–	54.01	53.65	–	–
2021	**23.39**	24.48	52.19	53.79	–	–
2022	23.52	24.18	51.22	52.54	–	–
2023	23.56	24.17	52.08	53.06	–	–
2024	23.47	**24.03**	50.95	52.97	–	–
2025	–	–	51.29	52.80	2:02.97	2:07.25
2026			**50.84**	**52.21**	**2:00.30**	**2:05.25**

Key: Lifetime best (in bold)

=== Team events ===
Type	Event	Time (m:s)	Location	Date	Record	Notes
Outdoor	4 × 400 m relay women	3:20.18	Tokyo, Japan	21 September 2025		Teamed with Lieke Klaver, Lisanne de Witte, and Femke Bol. Saalberg's split time for the first leg was 51.56 seconds.
Outdoor	4 × 400 m relay mixed	3:11.11	Tokyo, Japan	13 September 2025		Teamed with Eugene Omalla, Lieke Klaver, and Jonas Phijffers. Saalberg's split time for the anchor leg was 50.84 seconds.
Indoor	4 × 400 m relay short track women	3:25.66 i	Istanbul, Turkey	5 March 2023	NR	Teamed with Lieke Klaver, Cathelijn Peeters, and Femke Bol. Saalberg's split time for the second leg was 52.27 seconds.
Indoor	4 × 400 m relay short track mixed	3:15.63 i	Apeldoorn, Netherlands	6 March 2025	CR NR	Teamed with Nick Smidt, Tony van Diepen, and Femke Bol. Saalberg's split time for the second leg was 52.94 seconds.

== Competition results ==
Information from her World Athletics profile unless otherwise noted.

=== International competitions ===
Representing the Netherlands
Year	Competition	Venue	Position	Event	Time	Notes
2021	World Relays	Chorzów, Poland	4th	4 × 400 m relay	3:28.40	(Note: Time from the heats. Saalberg was replaced in the final.)
2021	World Relays	Chorzów, Poland	8th	4 × 400 m mixed	3:21.02	
2022	World Indoor Championships	Belgrade, Serbia	2nd	4 × 400 m relay	3:28.57	
2022	World Championships	Eugene, OR, United States	2nd	4 × 400 m mixed	3:12.63	(Note: Time from the heats. Saalberg was replaced in the final.)
2022	World Championships	Eugene, OR, United States	32nd (h)	400 m	52.59	
2022	European Championships	Munich, Germany	19th (sf)	400 m	52.45	
2022	European Championships	Munich, Germany	1st	4 × 400 m relay	3:20.87	NR
2023	European Indoor Championships	Istanbul, Turkey	1st	4 × 400 m relay	3:25.66	CR NR
2023	European Games	Chorzów, Poland	14th	4 × 400 m mixed	3:20.40	
2023	European Team Championships First Division	Chorzów, Poland	14th	4 × 400 m mixed	3:20.40	
2023	World Championships	Budapest, Hungary	1st	4 × 400 m relay	3:20.72	NR
2024	World Indoor Championships	Glasgow, United Kingdom	1st	4 × 400 m relay	3:27.70	(Note: Time from the heats. Saalberg was replaced in the final.)
2024	World Relays	Nassau, The Bahamas	3rd (rep)	4 × 400 m relay	3:27.45	
2024	European Championships	Rome, Italy	1st	4 × 400 m relay	3:25.99	(Note: Time from the heats. Saalberg was replaced in the final.)
2024	Olympic Games	Paris, France	2nd	4 × 400 m relay	3:25.03	(Note: Time from the heats. Saalberg was replaced in the final.)
2025	European Indoor Championships	Apeldoorn, Netherlands	1st	4 × 400 m mixed	3:15.63	CR NR
2025	European Indoor Championships	Apeldoorn, Netherlands	18th (h)	400 m	52.93	
2025	European Team Championships First Division	Madrid, Spain	15th	800 m	2:05.76	
2025	World Championships	Tokyo, Japan	2nd	4 × 400 m mixed	3:11.11	(Note: Time from the heats. Saalberg was replaced in the final.)
2025	World Championships	Tokyo, Japan	30th (h)	400 m	51.73	
2025	World Championships	Tokyo, Japan	3rd	4 × 400 m relay	3:20.18	
2026	World Indoor Championships	Toruń, Poland	2nd	4 × 400 m relay	3:26.00	
2026	European Championships	Birmingham, United Kingdom	13th (sf)	400 m	50.84	
2026	European Championships	Birmingham, United Kingdom	1st	4 × 400 m relay	3:21.10	(51.1 split)

=== National championships ===
Year	Competition	Venue	Position	Event	Time
2013	Dutch U18 Championships	Eindhoven	6th in semifinal	100 m	12.88
2013	Dutch U18 Championships	Eindhoven	5th in heats	200 m	26.25
2014	Dutch U18 Indoor Championships	Apeldoorn	2nd	400 m sh	58.10 i
2015	Dutch U18 Championships	Breda	7th in semifinal	400 m	60.62
2017	Dutch U20/U18 Championships, U20 Events	Vught	3rd	200 m	24.92
2017	Dutch Championships	Utrecht	3rd in semifinal	200 m	25.17
2018	Dutch Championships	Utrecht	3rd in semifinal	200 m	24.88
2019	Dutch Indoor Championships	Apeldoorn	5th	200 m sh	24.91 i
2019	Dutch Championships	The Hague	1st	400 m hurdles	58.86
2020	Dutch Indoor Championships	Apeldoorn	3rd	400 m sh	53.65 i
2020	Dutch Championships	Utrecht	2nd	400 m	54.16
2021	Dutch Indoor Championships	Apeldoorn	4th	400 m sh	53.79 i
2021	Dutch Championships	Breda	7th	400 m	53.91
2022	Dutch Indoor Championships	Apeldoorn	4th	400 m sh	52.69 i
2022	Dutch Championships	Apeldoorn	6th	200 m	23.76
2023	Dutch Indoor Championships	Apeldoorn	5th	400 m sh	53.20 i
2023	Dutch Championships	Breda	1st	400 m	52.20
2024	Dutch Indoor Championships	Apeldoorn	4th	400 m sh	53.51 i
2024	Dutch Championships	Hengelo	2nd	400 m	52.46
2025	Dutch Championships	Hengelo	2nd	400 m	51.69
2026	Dutch Indoor Championships	Apeldoorn	3rd	400 m sh	52.26 i
