= Kinga Gacka =

Polish sprinter

Personal information
- Born: 25 October 2001 (age 24) Gdańsk, Poland

Sport
- Country: Poland
- Sport: Track and field
- Event: Sprint
- Club: BKS Bydgoszcz
Medal record
Representing Poland
World Indoor Championships
Bronze medal – third place	2022 Belgrade	4×400 m relay
European Championships
Silver medal – second place	2022 Munich	4×400 m relay
World University Games
Silver medal – second place	2025 Bochum	4×400 m relay

Kinga Gacka (born 25 October 2001) is a Polish athlete sprinter who specializes in the 400 metres.

== International competitions ==
Year	Competition	Venue	Position	Event	Notes
Representing Poland
2018	European U18 Championships	Győr, Hungary	12th (sf)	400 m	55.62
2018	Youth Olympic Games	Buenos Aires, Argentina	18th	400 m	1:56.57^{1}
2019	European U20 Championships	Borås, Sweden	15th (sf)	400 m	56.30
2021	World Relays	Chorzów, Poland	2nd (h)	4 × 400 m relay	3:28.11
2021	European U23 Championships	Tallinn, Estonia	6th	400 m	52.53
2021	European U23 Championships	Tallinn, Estonia	3rd	4 × 400 m relay	3:30.38
2022	World Indoor Championships	Belgrade, Serbia	3rd	4 × 400 m relay	3:28.59
2022	World Championships	Eugene, United States	10th (h)	4 × 400 m relay	3:29.34
2022	European Championships	Munich, Germany	4th (h)	4 × 400 m relay	3:26.05
2023	European U23 Championships	Espoo, Finland	4th	4 × 400 m relay	3:31.38
2024	World Indoor Championships	Glasgow, United Kingdom	8th (h)	4 × 400 m relay	3:28.80
2024	World Relays	Nassau, Bahamas	2nd (h)	4 × 400 m relay	3:27.11^{2}
2024	European Championships	Rome, Italy	6th	4 × 400 m relay	3:23.91
2026	European Championships	Birmingham, United Kingdom	7th	4 × 400 m relay	3:27.63

^{1}Aggregate time of two races
^{2}Time from the heats. Gacka did not run in the final.
