= Gray's Creek High School =

American public school in North Carolina

Location
- 5301 Celebration Drive; Hope Mills, North Carolina 28348; United States; 34°55′54″N 78°54′27″W

Information
- School type: Public
- Established: 2003 (23 years ago)
- School district: Cumberland County Schools
- CEEB code: 341901
- Principal: Lisa Stewart
- Teaching staff: 73.97 (FTE)
- Grades: 9–12
- Enrollment: 1,419 (2023–2024)
- Student to teacher ratio: 19.18
- Colors: Gold and black
- Athletics: NCHSAA 6A
- Athletics conference: Tri-County 6A/7A
- Team name: Bears
- Feeder schools: Gray's Creek Middle
- Website: gchs.ccs.k12.nc.us

Gray's Creek High School is a school in Hope Mills, North Carolina that opened in the fall of 2003. The curriculum of the high school is core academics, supported by a career and technical program that is information technology based.

== Notable alumni ==
- Quanera Hayes — American sprinter specializing in the 400 meters, Olympic gold medalist in women's 4 x 400 m relay at 2024 Summer Olympics
