= Alexis Holmes =

American athlete (born 2000)

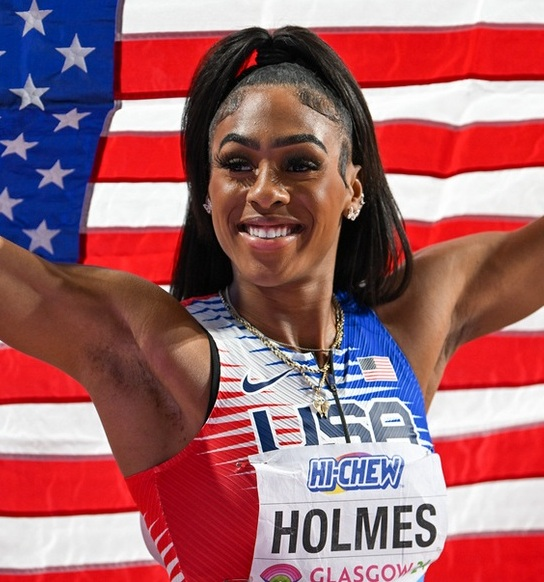
- Holmes in 2024

Personal information
- Born: January 28, 2000 (age 26) Hamden, Connecticut, U.S.
- Height: 178 cm (5 ft 10 in)

Sport
- Country: United States
- Sport: Athletics
- Event: 400 m
- Club: Nike
- Turned pro: 2022

Achievements and titles
- Personal bests: 400 m: 49.77 (Saint-Denis, Paris 2024)
Medal record
Women's athletics
Representing the United States
Olympic Games
Gold medal – first place	2024 Paris	4 × 400 m relay
World Championships
Gold medal – first place	2023 Budapest	4 × 400 m mixed
Gold medal – first place	2025 Tokyo	4 × 400 m relay
Gold medal – first place	2025 Tokyo	4 × 400 m mixed
World Ultimate Championship
First place	2026 Budapest	4 × 400 m mixed
World Indoor Championships
Gold medal – first place	2025 Nanjing	4 × 400 m relay
Silver medal – second place	2024 Glasgow	4 × 400 m relay
Silver medal – second place	2025 Nanjing	400 m
Bronze medal – third place	2024 Glasgow	400 m
World Relays
Gold medal – first place	2024 Nassau	4 × 400 m relay
Pan American Junior Championships
Gold medal – first place	2019 San Jose	4 × 400 m relay
Silver medal – second place	2019 San Jose	400 m

Alexis Holmes (born January 28, 2000) is an American track and field athlete who competes in the 400 metres. She won gold medals in the 4 × 400 metres relay at the 2024 Olympic Games as well the World Athletics Championships and World Athletics Indoor Championships.

== Early life ==
From Hamden, Connecticut, Holmes attended Cheshire Academy.

== Career ==
=== 2023 ===
Holmes ran a personal best 400 m time of 50.32 in Memphis, Tennessee in August 2023. She was selected for the American team for the 2023 World Athletics Championships and competed in the mixed 4 × 400 m relay. She won a gold medal as the USA team set a new world record time of 3:08.80. The world record time set by Holmes, Rosey Effiong, Matthew Boling and Justin Robinson was ratified by World Athletics in November 2023. That month, a photograph taken of Holmes and Dutch athlete Femke Bol at the finish line taken by Sam Barnes was a finalist for the 2023 World Athletics Photograph of the Year award.

=== 2024 ===
In February 2024, she won the US national indoor title over 400 metres with a championship record time of 50.34 in New Mexico. She competed in the 400 metres at the 2024 World Athletics Championships in Glasgow and won the bronze medal in the final in a personal best time of 50.24 seconds. She was part of the 4 × 400m relay team which won the silver medal in Glasgow.

In April 2024, she was selected as part of the American team for the 2024 World Athletics Relays in Nassau, Bahamas. She won the 400 metres at the 2024 BAUHAUS-galan in Stockholm on June 2, 2024.

She competed at the 2024 Summer Olympics over 400 metres in August 2024, running a personal best time of 49.77 seconds to place sixth in the final. She also competed in the women's 4 × 400m relay at the Games, winning the gold medal with the American relay team.

In December 2024, it was announced that she had signed up for the inaugural season of the Michael Johnson founded Grand Slam Track.

=== 2025 ===
In February 2025, she retained her title at the 2025 USA Indoor Track and Field Championships. She was selected for the 2025 World Athletics Indoor Championships in Nanjing in March 2025, where she won the silver medal in the final in 50.63 seconds, 0.03 seconds behind Great Britain's Amber Anning. She also won gold in the women's 4 × 400 metres relay. In April 2025, she competed at the inaugural Grand Slam Track event in Kingston, Jamaica in the Long Sprints category, placing fourth in the 400 metres in 50.12 seconds. At the second 2025 Grand Slam Track event in Miami she finished third in the 400 metres with a time of 50.36 seconds on 2 May 2025. She finished fifth in the final of the 400 metres at the 2025 USA Outdoor Track and Field Championships in 50.33 seconds. She finished fourth at the 2025 Athletissima in wet conditions in Lausanne.

She was subsequently selected for the 2025 World Athletics Championships in where she ran in the women's x 400 metres relay. She also ran as the American team won the gold medal in the mixed 4 × 400 metres relay in Tokyo.

=== 2026 ===
On 25 July, Holmes placed second to Aaliyah Butler over 400 metres at the 2026 USA Outdoor Track and Field Championships in New York, running 50.47 seconds with a late surge to beat Sanaria Butler. In September, Holmes was selected to compete at the inaugural World Athletics Ultimate Championship in Budapest, winning the mixed 4 × 400 metres relay with the American team.

== Statistics ==
=== Circuit performances ===
Grand Slam Track results
Slam	Race group	Event	Pl.	Time	Prize money
2025 Kingston Slam	Long sprints	200 m	6th	23.33	US$25,000
2025 Kingston Slam	Long sprints	400 m	4th	50.12	US$25,000
2025 Miami Slam	Long sprints	400 m	3rd	50.36	US$25,000
2025 Miami Slam	Long sprints	200 m	5th	22.83	US$25,000
2025 Philadelphia Slam	Long sprints	400 m	4th	51.02	US$20,000
2025 Philadelphia Slam	Long sprints	200 m	6th	22.97	US$20,000

=== International competitions ===
Representing the United States
Year	Competition	Venue	Position	Event	Time	Notes
2019	Pan American U20 Championships	San José, Costa Rica	2nd	400 m	52.59	
2019	Pan American U20 Championships	San José, Costa Rica	1st	4 × 400 m relay	3:24.04	WU20R
2023	World Championships	Budapest, Hungary	1st	Mixed 4 × 400 m relay	3:08.80	WR
2023	World Championships	Budapest, Hungary	– (h)	4 × 400 m relay	DQ	TR24.7
2024	World Indoor Championships	Glasgow, United Kingdom	3rd	400 m sh	50.24	PB
2024	World Indoor Championships	Glasgow, United Kingdom	2nd	4 × 400 m relay sh	3:25.34	
2024	World Relays	Nassau, Bahamas	1st	4 × 400 m relay	3:21.70	
2024	Olympic Games	Paris, France	6th	400 m	49.77	PB
2024	Olympic Games	Paris, France	1st	4 × 400 m relay	3:15.27	AR
2025	World Indoor Championships	Nanjing, China	2nd	400 m	50.63	
2025	World Indoor Championships	Nanjing, China	1st	4 × 400 m relay	3:27.45	
2025	World Championships	Tokyo, Japan	1st	Mixed 4 × 400 m relay	3:08.80	=CR
2025	World Championships	Tokyo, Japan	1st (h)	4 × 400 m relay	3:22.53	
2026	World Ultimate Championship	Budapest, Hungary	15th (h)	400 m	51.60	

=== NCAA ===
Holmes attended Penn State and was named Big Ten women's freshman of the year in 2019 before transferring and graduating from the University of Kentucky in 2022.

Running for the Kentucky Wildcats, Holmes was part of a women's 4 × 400 m relay team that set a new college record time. They also won the NCAA Division I title in 2022.

Year	Competition	Position	Event	Time
2019	Big Ten Indoor Track and Field Championships	5th	200 m	23.74
2019	Big Ten Indoor Track and Field Championships	1st	400 m	52.14
2019	Big Ten Indoor Track and Field Championships	5th	4 × 400 m	3:41.39
2019	NCAA Division I Indoor Track and Field Championships	4th	400 m	52.37
2019	Big Ten Outdoor Track and Field Championships	5th	200 m	23.83
2019	Big Ten Outdoor Track and Field Championships	1st	400 m	52.17
Representing the Kentucky Wildcats (2020–2022)
2020	Southeastern Conference (SEC) Indoor Track and Field Championships	1st	400 m	52.08
2020	Southeastern Conference (SEC) Indoor Track and Field Championships	2nd	4 × 400 m	3:35.52
2020	NCAA Division I Indoor Track and Field Championships	All-American	400 m	Cancelled by COVID-19
2020	NCAA Division I Indoor Track and Field Championships	All-American	4 × 400 m	Cancelled by COVID-19
2022	Southeastern Conference (SEC) Indoor Track and Field Championships	1st	400 m	50.77
2022	Southeastern Conference (SEC) Indoor Track and Field Championships	3rd	4 × 400 m	3:25.89
2022	NCAA Division I Indoor Track and Field Championships	4th	400 m	51.50
2022	NCAA Division I Indoor Track and Field Championships	3rd	4 × 400 m	3:28.77
2022	Southeastern Conference (SEC) Outdoor Track and Field Championships	3rd	400 m	50.74
2022	Southeastern Conference (SEC) Outdoor Track and Field Championships	1st	4 × 400 m	3:21.93
2022	NCAA Division I Outdoor Track and Field Championships	4th	400 m	50.71
2022	NCAA Division I Outdoor Track and Field Championships	1st	4 × 400 m	3:22.55

== See also ==
- List of Pennsylvania State University Olympians
