= Quanera Hayes =

American sprinter (born 1992)

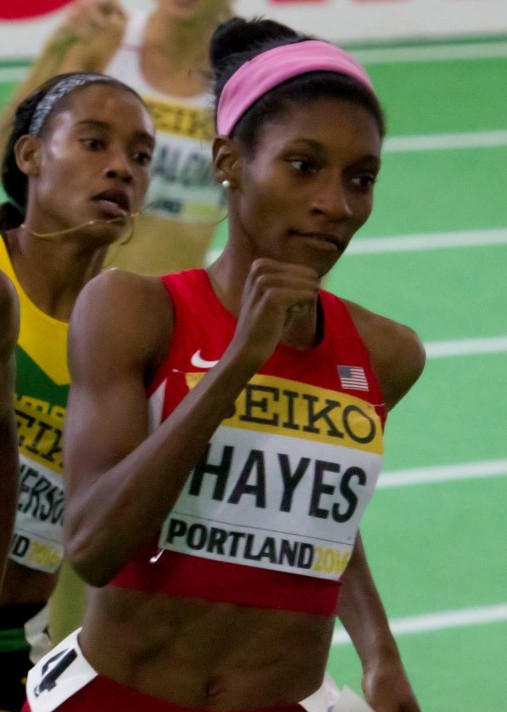
- Hayes at the 2016 World Indoor Championships

Personal information
- Nationality: United States
- Born: March 7, 1992 (age 34) Dillon, South Carolina, U.S.
- Home town: Hope Mills, North Carolina, U.S.
- Education: Gray's Creek High School, Livingstone College
- Employer: Nike
- Height: 5 ft 9 in (175 cm)

Sport
- Sport: Track and field
- Event: 400 m
- Club: Life Speed Athletics
- Coached by: Derrick White

Achievements and titles
- Personal bests: 400 m: 49.72 (2017); 300 m: 35.71 (2017, indoor NR); 200 m: 22.55 (2017); 100 m: 11.27 (2016)
Medal record
Women's athletics
Representing United States
Olympic Games
Gold medal – first place	2024 Paris	4 × 400 m relay
World Championships
Gold medal – first place	2017 London	4 × 400 m relay
Gold medal – first place	2025 Tokyo	4 × 400 m relay
World Indoor Championships
Gold medal – first place	2016 Portland	4 × 400 m relay
Gold medal – first place	2018 Birmingham	4 × 400 m relay
Gold medal – first place	2025 Nanjing	4 × 400 m relay
Bronze medal – third place	2016 Portland	400 m
World Relays
Gold medal – first place	2017 Bahamas	4 × 400 m relay
Gold medal – first place	2024 Nassau	4 × 400 m relay
Diamond League
First place	2021	400 m

Quanera Hayes (/kwəˈnɪərə/ kwə-NEER-ə; born March 7, 1992) is an American sprinter specializing in the 400 meters distance. She won the bronze medal at the 2016 World Indoor Championships and is the 2020 US Olympic Trials champion in the women's 400 m. She has earned several gold medals for the United States in the 4 × 400 m relay, including at the World Championships and World Relays in 2017, the World Indoor Championships in 2016, 2018 and 2025, and the Olympic Games in 2024.

== Early life ==
Hayes was born March 7, 1992. She was raised in Hope Mills, North Carolina, and attend Gray's Creek High School. Following high school, she attended Livingstone College in Salisbury, North Carolina, a NCAA Division II school. Hayes competed for the Livingstone College track and field team from 2012 until 2015, when she graduated.

== Professional track career ==
Hayes won the women's 400 m at the United States Olympic Trials on June 20, 2021, qualifying for the delayed 2020 Summer Olympics with a seasonal best time of 49.78 seconds ahead of Allyson Felix.

== Personal life ==
As of June 20, 2021, she had a 2-year-old son named Demetrius.

== Competition record ==
Representing the United States
Year	Competition	Venue	Position	Event	Notes
2016	World Indoor Championships	Portland, Oregon, US	3rd	400 m	51.76
2016	World Indoor Championships	Portland, Oregon, US	1st	4 × 400 m relay	3:26.38
2017	World Relays	Nassau, Bahamas	1st	4 × 400 m relay	3:24.36
2017	World Championships	London, United Kingdom	9th (sf)	400 m	50.71
2017	World Championships	London, United Kingdom	1st	4 × 400 m relay	3:19.02
2018	World Indoor Championships	Birmingham, United Kingdom	1st	4 × 400 m relay	3:23.85 AR
2021	Olympic Games	Tokyo, Japan	7th	400 m	50.88
2023	World Championships	Budapest, Hungary	–	4 × 400 m relay	DQ
2024	World Indoor Championships	Glasgow, United Kingdom	2nd	4 × 400 m relay	3:25.34
2024	Olympic Games	Paris, France	1st	4 × 400 m relay	3:15.27 WL, AR
2025	World Indoor Championships	Nanjing, China	1st	4 × 400 m relay	3:27.45
2025	World Championships	Tokyo, Japan	1st (h)	4 × 400 m relay	3:22.53

- Information from World Athletics profile.

=== Circuit wins and titles ===
- Diamond League champion (400 m): 2021
  - 2021 (1) (400 m): Zürich Weltklasse

== Personal bests ==
Surface	Event	Time	Venue	Date	Notes
Outdoor	400 m	49.72	Sacramento, California, US	June 24, 2017	
Outdoor	200 m	22.55	Gainesville, Florida, US	April 28, 2017	-0.3 m/s wind
Outdoor	100 m	11.27	Gainesville, Florida, US	April 22, 2016	+0.4 m/s wind
Indoor	400 m	51.09	Portland, Oregon, US	March 12, 2016	
Indoor	300 m	35.71	Clemson, South Carolina, US	January 7, 2017	Indoor American record
Indoor	200 m	22.70	Fayetteville, Arkansas, US	February 7, 2021	

- Information from World Athletics profile.
