= Naomi Van den Broeck =

Belgian sprinter (born 1996)

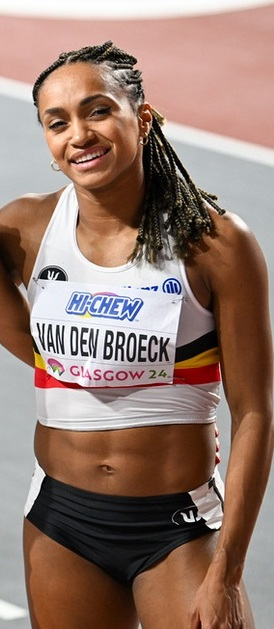
- at 2024 World Athletics Indoor Championships

Personal information
- Nationality: Belgian
- Born: 3 January 1996 (age 30)

Sport
- Sport: Athletics
- Event: Sprint

Achievements and titles
- Personal bests: 200 m: 23.38 (Meilen, 2023); 300 m: 36.94 (Bergen, 2024); 400 m: 50.80 (Madrid, 2024); 400 mH: 53.65 (Tokyo, 2025) NR
Medal record
Women's athletics
Representing Belgium
European Championships
Bronze medal – third place	2024 Rome	4 × 400 m relay

Naomi Van den Broeck (born 3 January 1996) is a Belgian sprinter. She has represented Belgium at multiple major championships, including 2020 and 2024 Olympic Games.

== Career ==
She represented Belgium at the 2020 Summer Olympics in Tokyo 2021, competing in women's 4 × 400 metres relay. She competed at the World Indoor Championships in Belgrade in March 2022. She was also selected for the Belgian 4 × 400 m relay team for the World Championships later that year in Eugene, Oregon, U.S.A.

She was selected for the 2024 World Athletics Indoor Championships in Glasgow as part of the 4 × 400 m relay team and was part of the quartet which qualified for the final and finished in fourth position. Later in 2024, at the World Athletics Relays in The Bahamas, she was on the team that qualified Belgium for the women's 4 × 400 metres relay at the 2024 Summer Olympic Games in Paris, France. And later that same year, she was on the Belgian 4 × 400 metres women's relay team that won a bronze medal at the European Athletics Championships. At the 2024 Summer Olympic Games, she ran in the heats and final of both the mixed 4 × 400 metres relay and the women's 4 × 400 metres relay with the Belgium teams finishing 4th resp. 7th in the finals. She also participated in the women's 400 metres hurdles reaching the semi-finals.

In 2025, she signed-up to race as a challenger in the Grand Slam Track event in Miami, as a part of the women's long hurdles category. In May 2025, at the World Athletics Relays in Guangzhou, China, she ran as a member of the Belgium women's 4 × 400 metres relay team in the heat and repêchage round, qualifying the team for the 2025 World Athletics Championships. She won the 400 metres hurdles for Belgium at the 2025 European Athletics Team Championships Second Division in Maribor on 28 June. She qualified for the individual 400 metres hurdles race at the 2025 World Athletics Championships in Tokyo, Japan by posting a personal best of 54.37s and winning the 400 metres hurdles race at the Madrid leg of the 2025 World Athletics Continental Tour. At the Brussels Memorial Van Damme meeting of the 2025 Diamond League she set a Belgian national record in the women's 400 metres hurdles with a time of 54.12 seconds. At the 2025 World Athletics Championships in Tokyo, Japan, she ran with the Belgium women's 4 × 400 metres relay team in the heats and final of the 2025 World Athletics Championships – Women's 4 × 400 metres relay, finishing just outside the medals in fourth position in the final. She posted a national record of 53.65 in the semi-finals of the 400 metres hurdles and qualified for the final. In doing so, she became the third Belgian woman ever, after Kim Gevaert and Cynthia Bolingo, to reach a final of a running event and finish in the top eight. She finished a respectable sixth.

== Statistics ==
=== Circuit performances ===
Grand Slam Track results
Slam	Race group	Event	Pl.	Time	Prize money
2025 Miami Slam	Long hurdles	400 m hurdles	7th	56.63	US$12,500
2025 Miami Slam	Long hurdles	400 m	6th	52.26	US$12,500

=== International competitions ===
Year	Competition	Venue	Position	Event	Notes
Representing Belgium
2021	Olympic Games	Tokyo, Japan	7th	4 × 400 m relay	3:23.96
2022	World Indoor Championships	Belgrade, Serbia	6th	4 × 400 m relay	3:33.61
2022	European Championships	Munich, Germany	2nd (h)	4 × 400 m relay	3:25.44
2022	European Championships	Munich, Germany	16th (h)	400 m	52.80
2022	World Championships	Eugene, Oregon, USA	4th (h)	4 × 400 m relay	3:28.02
2022	World Championships	Eugene, Oregon, USA	40th	400 m	53.16
2023	World Championships	Budapest, Hungary	4th (h)	4 × 400 m relay	3:23.63
2024	World Indoor Championships	Glasgow, Scotland	4th	4 × 400 m relay	3:28.05
2024	World Relays	Nassau, The Bahamas	1st (r)	4 × 400 m relay	3:26.79
2024	European Championships	Rome, Italy	11th (sf)	400 m	51.65
2024	European Championships	Rome, Italy	3rd place, bronze medalist(s)	4 × 400 m relay	3:22.95
2024	European Championships	Rome, Italy	4th	4 × 400 m relay mixed	3:11.03
2024	Olympic Games	Paris, France	18th (sf)	400 m hurdles	54.94
2024	Olympic Games	Paris, France	7th	4 × 400 m relay	3:22.40
2024	Olympic Games	Paris, France	4th	4 × 400 m relay mixed	3:09.36
2025	World Championships	Tokyo, Japan	6th	400 m hurdles	53.70
2025	World Championships	Tokyo, Japan	4th	4 × 400 m relay	3:22.15

== Personal life ==
Van den Broeck was born in Belgium to a Senegalese mother and Belgian father. As a youth, she grew up in Belgium, South Africa, Jamaica, Ireland and Norway.
