= Ama Pipi =

British sprinter (born 1995)

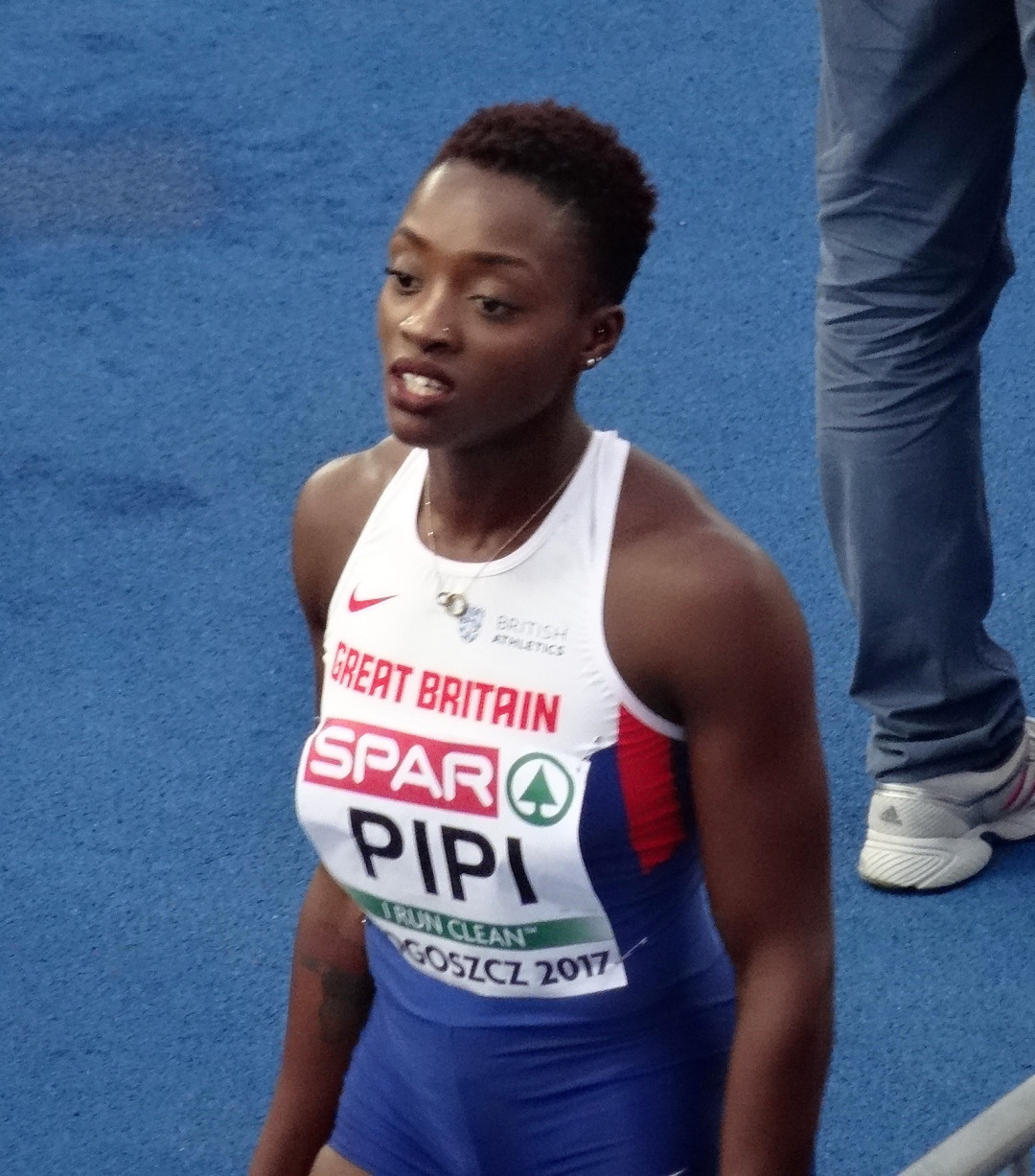
- Ama Pipi in 2017

Personal information
- Nationality: British
- Born: 26 November 1995 (age 30) London, England

Sport
- Sport: Athletics
- Event: 400 metres
- College team: Oklahoma Sooners
Medal record
Women's athletics
Representing Great Britain
World Championships
Bronze medal – third place	2022 Eugene	4×400 m relay
Bronze medal – third place	2023 Budapest	4×400 m relay
European Championships
Bronze medal – third place	2022 Munich	4×400 m relay
European Indoor Championships
Silver medal – second place	2021 Toruń	4×400 m relay

Amarachi "Ama" Pipi (born 26 November 1995) is a British track and field athlete who specializes in sprinting. In 2020, Pipi became the British indoor champion in the 200-meter race. She competed in the women's 400 metres event at the 2021 European Athletics Indoor Championships.

== Athletics career ==
=== Club ===
She joined the Enfield & Haringey Athletics Club in 2007 at the age of 14. She has been coached by Linford Christie since 2019.

=== College ===
Pipi attended University of Oklahoma from 2015 to 2018 where she studied sociology and competed as an NCAA sprinter on the Sooner Track and Field team. During this time she competed in both indoor and outdoor sprinting events. Among other accolades, she was selected as an NCAA Indoor First Team All-American in 2018, qualified for the 2018 NCAA Outdoor Championship, became the first woman in Sooner school history to win the 200-meter title in the Big 12 and is the school record holder for indoor 400m sprint.

=== Professional ===
Pipi gained her first international experience at the Junior World Championships in 2014 as a member of Great Britain's Women's 4 x 100 meter team. In 2017, she finished fifth in the 200-meter run at the U23 European Championships in Bydgoszcz. In 2020, Pipi became British indoor champion in the 200-meter race. In 2021 she reached the semifinals at the European Indoor Championships in Toruń in the 400-meter run and won the silver medal in the 4 x 400 meter relay.

At the 2022 European Championships, She was part of British 4 x 400 quartet that ran the second fastest time ever (3:21.74) by a British women's team.
