= Na'Asha Robinson =

American athlete

Personal information
- Nationality: American
- Born: 23 January 1997 (age 29)

Sport
- Sport: Athletics
- Event: 400 metres

Achievements and titles
- Personal best(s): 400m: 51.30 (Eugene, 2021)
Medal record
Women's athletics
Representing United States
World Indoor Championships
Silver medal – second place	2024 Glasgow	4 × 400 m relay

Na'Asha Robinson (born 23 January 1997) is an American track and field athlete who competes as a sprinter.

== Early life ==
From Huntsville, Alabama, she attended S.R. Butler High School. In 2017, she became the first Tennessee Tech athlete to advance to the NCAA Division 1 Outdoor Championships. She later graduated from the University of Arizona in literacy, learning and leadership, and enrolled in graduate school at Alabama A&M.

== Career ==
In February 2020, she finished second at the US national indoor championship in Albuquerque, New Mexico, over 400 metres.

In June 2021, she ran a new 400 m personal best of 51.94 seconds in Nashville. In August 2021, she lowered her personal best to 51.30 seconds in Eugene, Oregon.

In March 2022, she was selected for the 4 × 400 m team at Belgrade's 2022 World Athletics Indoor Championships.

She finished sixth at the 2024 USA Indoor Track and Field Championships in New Mexico in the 400 metres.

She was selected for the 2024 World Athletics Indoor Championships in Glasgow as part of the 4 × 400 m relay team. She was part of the quartet which qualified for the final, where they finished in the silver medal position.

In April 2024, she was selected for the American team for the 2024 World Athletics Relays in Nassau, Bahamas.
