= Jessie Knight (athlete) =

British hurdler (born 1994)

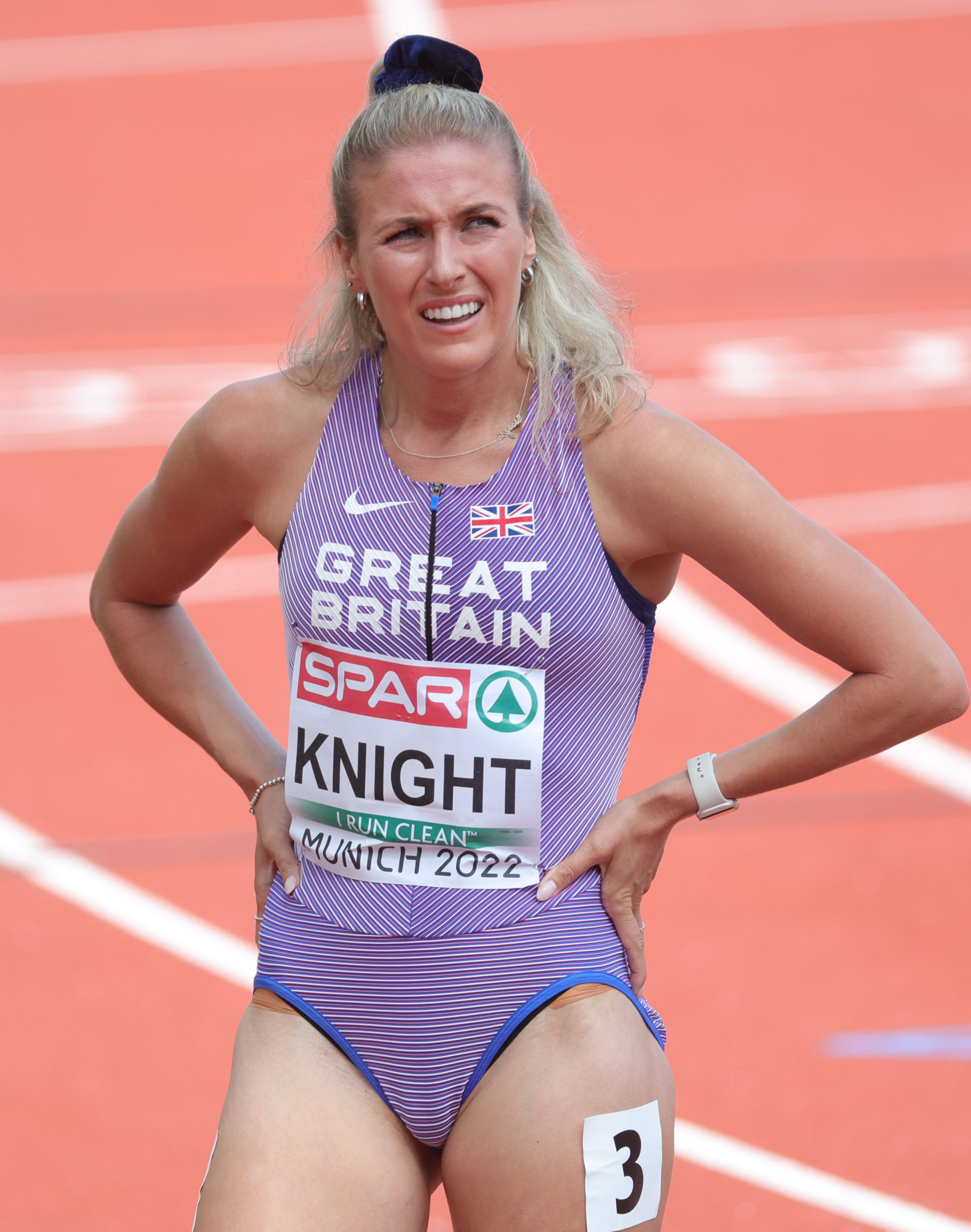
- Jessie Knight in 2022

Personal information
- Born: 15 June 1994 (age 32) Epsom, Surrey, England

Sport
- Country: Great Britain
- Sport: Athletics
- Event: 400 metres hurdles
- Club: Windsor, Slough, Eton and Hounslow Athletic Club
- Coached by: Marina Armstrong
Medal record
Women's athletics
Representing Great Britain
World Championships
| Bronze medal – third place | 2022 Eugene | 4×400 m relay |
World Indoor Championships
| Bronze medal – third place | 2024 Glasgow | 4×400 m relay |
European Indoor Championships
| Silver medal – second place | 2021 Toruń | 4×400 m relay |

Jessie Knight (born 15 June 1994) is a British former athlete who specialised in the 400 metres hurdles.

== Career ==
Knight became the British champion of the 400 metres hurdles event after winning at the 2020 British Athletics Championships with a time of 55.80 seconds.

In May 2021, she improved on her record at the year's Golden Spike Ostrava with a personal best of 54.74 seconds. She was later named to the British track and field team ahead of the 2020 Summer Olympics for the 400 metres hurdles event alongside Meghan Beesley and Jessica Turner. Upon arriving in Tokyo, Knight was one of six British athletes forced to self-isolate after a passenger on her flight had tested positive for COVID-19. At the Olympics, Knight stumbled in her heat race for the 400 metres hurdles event as she approached the track's first bend and crashed into the first hurdle, ending her hopes to medal in the event. Knight hoped to, but did not, race in the women's 4 x 400 metres relay.

Knight competed in the women's 4 x 400 metres relay for England in the 2022 Commonwealth Games, where despite managing to hold off Canada's Kyra Constantine to finish first in the final by 0.01s, England did not medal due to a lane violation earlier in the race.

After winning the 400 metres hurdles silver medal at the 2024 British Athletics Championships, Knight was subsequently named in the Great Britain team for the 2024 Summer Olympics. She went out in the semi-finals at the Games in Paris.

Knight announced her retirement from professional athletics in November 2024.

== Personal life ==
Knight now works as a primary school teacher.
