= Aiyanna Stiverne =

Canadian sprinter

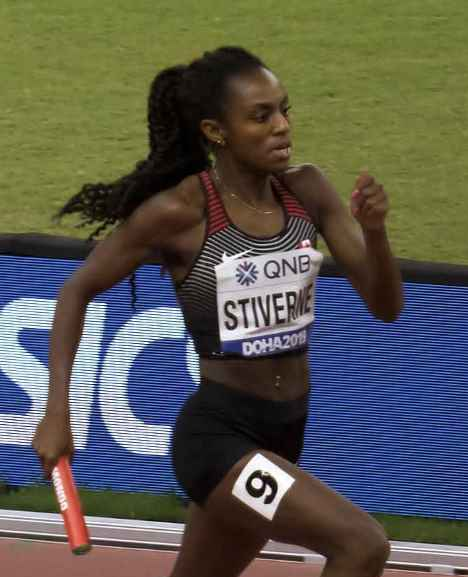

Personal information
- Full name: Aiyanna Brigitte Stiverne
- Nationality: Canadian
- Born: 20 February 1995 (age 31) Miami, Florida, U.S.
- Home town: Laval, Quebec, Canada
- Education: University of Miami; University of Texas at El Paso
- Height: 165 cm (5 ft 5 in)
- Weight: 52 kg (115 lb)

Sport
- Sport: Sprinting
- Events: 400 metres, 200 metres
- College team: Miami Hurricanes; UTEP Miners
Medal record
Women's athletics
Representing Canada
Commonwealth Games
Gold medal – first place	2022 Birmingham	4×400 m relay
Pan American Games
Silver medal – second place	2019 Lima	4×400 m relay
IAAF World Relays
Silver medal – second place	2019 Yokohama	Mixed 4×400 m relay
Bronze medal – third place	2024 Nassau	4×400 m relay
North American, Central American and Caribbean Championships
Silver medal – second place	2018 Toronto	400 m
Bronze medal – third place	2018 Toronto	4×400 m relay

Aiyanna Brigitte Stiverne (born 20 February 1995) is an American-born sprinter who competes for Canada. Born in Miami, Florida, her hometown is Laval, Quebec. She first competed for Canada in the 4 × 400 metres relay at the Beijing 2015 World Championships, followed by the 400 metres at the London 2017 World Championships.

As a student, Stiverne competed for the University of Texas at El Paso and the University of Miami. She was an alternate member of the American team for the 2014 World Junior Championships in Eugene, Oregon.

Aiyanna is the cousin of former WBC heavyweight world champion Bermane Stiverne.
