= Victoria Ohuruogu =

British athletics competitor (born 1993)

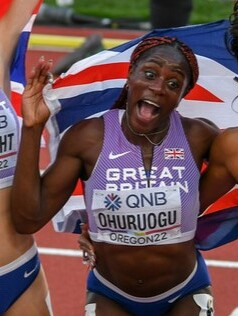
- Ohuruogu in 2022

Personal information
- Nationality: British/Nigerian
- Born: 28 February 1993 (age 33) London, England
- Relative: Christine Ohuruogu (sister)

Sport
- Sport: Track and field
- Event: 400 metres
- Club: Newham & Essex Beagles
Medal record
Women's athletics
Representing Great Britain
Olympic Games
Bronze medal – third place	2024 Paris	4×400 m relay
World Championships
Bronze medal – third place	2022 Eugene	4×400 m relay
World Indoor Championships
Bronze medal – third place	2014 Sopot	4×400 m relay
European Championships
Bronze medal – third place	2014 Zürich	4×400 m relay
Bronze medal – third place	2022 Munich	4×400 m relay
European Indoor Championships
Silver medal – second place	2015 Prague	4×400 m relay
European U23 Championships
Gold medal – first place	2015 Tallinn	4×400 m relay
Representing England
Commonwealth Games
Silver medal – second place	2022 Birmingham	400 m

Victoria Ohuruogu // (born 28 February 1993) is an English track athlete who competes in the 400 metres. She won a bronze medal at the 2024 Olympics as part of the British women's 4 × 400 m relay team. She won the silver medal in the individual event at the 2022 Commonwealth Games. She is the younger sister of Olympic, World and Commonwealth Games champion Christine Ohuruogu, and has seven other siblings.

== Career ==
In March 2014, Victoria competed in the senior team relay alongside her sister Christine Ohuruogu at the World Athletics Indoor Championships in Sopot, Poland.

In 2022, she became the British 400 metres champion after winning the title at the 2022 British Athletics Championships.

At the 2022 World Athletics Championships in Eugene, Oregon, Ohuruogu won the bronze medal as a member of the women's 4 × 400 metres relay team. At the 2022 European Championships, she was part of women's 4 x 400 m quartet than ran the second fastest time ever by a British women's team of 3:21.74. In July 2024, she was named in the Great Britain individual 400 metres and 4x400 metres relay squad for the 2024 Summer Olympics. The team won the bronze medal.

== Personal bests ==
- 200 metres – 23.47 (-0.8 m/s, Memphis, Tennessee 2023)
- 400 metres – 50.48 (Chorzów 2023)
  - 400 metres indoor – 51.89 (Albuquerque, New Mexico 2023)
