= 2026 World Athletics Relays – Women's 4 × 400 metres relay =

Women's 4 × 400 metres relay at the 2026 World Athletics Relays
- Venue: Botswana National Stadium, Gaborone
- Dates: 2 May (heats); 3 May (repechage round & final)
- Winning time: 3:20.96

Medalists
gold medal	Josefine Tomine Eriksen Aks; Amalie Iuel; Astri Ertzgaard; Henriette Jæger	Norway
silver medal	Paula Sevilla; Ana Prieto; Rocío Arroyo; Blanca Hervás	Spain
bronze medal	Zoe Sherar; Lauren Gale; Jasneet Nijjar; Savannah Sutherland; Dianna Proctor*	Canada

The women's 4 × 400 metres relay at the 2026 World Athletics Relays was held at the Botswana National Stadium in Gaborone, Botswana on 2 and 3 May 2026.

The event will serve as a qualifying event for the 2027 World Athletics Championships in Beijing. In this context, the top 12 teams in each event will qualify for the World Championships.

== Records ==
Prior to the competition, the records were as follows:

Record	Team	Time	Location	Date
World record	Soviet Union (Tatyana Ledovskaya, Olga Nazarova, Mariya Pinigina, Olga Bryzgina)	3:15.17	Seoul, South Korea	1 October 1988
Championships record	United States (Phyllis Francis, Natasha Hastings, Sanya Richards-Ross, Francena McCorory)	3:19.39	(The Bahamas) Nassau, Bahamas	3 May 2015
2026 World Leading	(United States) Arkansas (Sanaria Butler, Analissa Batista, Kaylyn Brown, Sanu Jallow)	3:22.06	Waco, United States	28 March 2026

== Qualification ==
The top 8 teams in each event at the 2025 World Athletics Championships automatically qualify for entry to the championships. The remaining teams (up to 24 in total per event ) will be determined through the top lists in the qualification period from 1 January 2025 to 5 April 2026. Host country Botswana can enter with one team in each event, regardless of any entry conditions.

== Program ==
All times are local (UTC+2).

Date	Time	Round
2 May 2026	15:55	Heats
3 May 2026	15:30	Repechage round
3 May 2026	16:40	Final

== Results ==
=== Heats (World Championships Qualifying Round 1) ===
The heats were held on 2 May 2026, starting at 15:55 in the afternoon. Qualification: the first 2 of each heat (WQ) plus 2 fastest times (Wq) qualify to World Athletics Championships and World Athletics Relays Final.

==== Heat 1 ====
Rank	Lane	Nation	Competitors	Time	Notes
1	5	Spain	Paula Sevilla, Rocío Arroyo, Ana Prieto, Blanca Hervás	3:24.44	WQ, SB
2	8	Czech Republic	Barbora Malíková, Nikola Bisová, Terezie Táborská, Lurdes Gloria Manuel	3:25.42	WQ, SB
3	4	Germany	Skadi Schier, Jana Lakner, Annkathrin Hoven, Irina Gorr	3:25.76	Wq, SB
4	6	France	Fanny Peltier, Shana Grebo, Emma Montoya, Isabelle Black	3:26.89	SB
5	7	Jamaica	Andrenette Knight, Leah Anderson, Janielle Josephs, Shiann Salmon	3:27.19	SB
6	3	Nigeria	Esther Okon, Tolheebat Jimoh, Taiwo Mary Kudoro, Jecinta Lawrence	3:30.71	SB
7	2	Brazil	Leticia Lima, Julia Riberio, Jainy Sueen Dos Santos Barreto, Maria Victoria de Sena	3:31.59	SB

==== Heat 2 ====
Rank	Lane	Nation	Competitors	Time	Notes
1	3	Canada	Zoe Sherar, Lauren Gale, Jasneet Nijjar, Dianna Proctor	3:23.52	WQ, SB
2	6	Italy	Rebecca Borga, Virginia Troiani, Alessandra Bonora, Alice Mangione	3:24.46	WQ, SB
3	4	Poland	Anna Gryc, Weronika Bartnowska, Alicja Wrona-Kutrzepa, Justyna Święty-Ersetic	3:27.62	
4	7	Ireland	Rachel McCann, Jenna Breen, Molly Daly, Arlene Crossan	3:29.93	SB
5	2	Botswana	Naleedi Monthe, Obakeng Kamberuka, Galefele Maroko, Kennekae Batisani	3:30.12	SB
6	5	Belgium	Liefde Schoemaker, Manon De Marez, Isalie Vandael, Camille Laus	3:32.04	SB
7	1	Ethiopia	Banchalem Bikese, Rachel Tesfaye, Genet Ayele, Ajayeba Aliye	3:33.18	NR
8	8	Kenya	Lanoline Aoko, Gladys Ngure, Margaret Tajeu, Moureen Wafula	3:35.90	SB

==== Heat 3 ====
Rank	Lane	Nation	Competitors	Time	Notes
1	8	Great Britain	Laviai Nielsen, Emily Newnham, Charlotte Henrich, Nicole Yeargin	3:21.28	WQ, WL
2	4	Norway	Josefine Tomine Eriksen Aks, Amalie Iuel, Astri Ertzgaard, Henriette Jæger	3:22.78	WQ, NR
3	6	Netherlands	Nina Franke, Lieke Klaver, Myrte van der Schoot, Eveline Saalberg	3:24.74	Wq, SB
4	5	South Africa	Precious Molepo, Christi Loggenberg, Hannah van Niekerk, Marlie Viljoen	3:26.77	SB
5	7	Australia	Alice Dixon, Alanah Yukich, Alexia Loizou, Sarah Carli	3:27.44	SB
6	2	Switzerland	Karin Disch, Iris Caligiuri, Salome Hüsler, Annina Fahr	3:34.37	SB
7	3	Mexico	Monica Rios, Anaid Torres, Paola Mireles, Claudia Alvarado	3:39.61	

=== Repechage Round (World Championships Qualifying Round 2) ===
The repechage round was held on 3 May 2026, starting at 15:30 in the afternoon. Qualification: the first 2 of each heat (WQ) qualify to World Athletics Championships.

==== Heat 1 ====
Rank	Lane	Nation	Competitors	Time	Notes
1	8	Ireland	Rachel McCann, Sophie Becker, Arlene Crossan, Sharlene Mawdsley	3:23.83	WQ, SB
2	6	France	Isabelle Black, Shana Grebo, Louise Maraval, Amandine Brossier	3:24.48	WQ, SB
3	7	Jamaica	Leah Anderson, Shiann Salmon, Janielle Josephs, Andrenette Knight	3:25.38	SB
4	5	Kenya	Lanoline Aoko, Hellen Syombua Kalii, Margaret Tajeu, Moureen Wafula	3:32.24	SB
5	2	Mexico	Claudia Alvarado, Anaid Torres, Monica Rios, Paola Mireles	3:39.17	
	4	Switzerland	Iris Caligiuri, Annina Fahr, Karin Disch, Salome Hüsler	DNF	
	3	Nigeria		DNS	

==== Heat 2 ====
Rank	Lane	Nation	Competitors	Time	Notes
1	7	Poland	Anna Gryc, Weronika Bartnowska, Justyna Święty-Ersetic, Natalia Bukowiecka	3:26.52	WQ
2	6	Australia	Alice Dixon, Alanah Yukich, Sarah Carli, Ellie Beer	3:26.92	WQ, SB
3	3	South Africa	Precious Molepo, Christi Loggenberg, Jada van Staden, Hannah van Niekerk	3:27.78	
4	5	Brazil	Julia Riberio, Maria Victoria de Sena, Jainy Sueen Dos Santos Barreto, Anny Caroline De Bassi	3:28.59	SB
5	8	Botswana	Kennekae Batisani, Naleedi Monthe, Lebitso Mokorofu, Golekanye Kebonye Chikani	3:32.38	
6	4	Belgium	Manon De Marez, Messalina Pieroni, Isalie Vandael, Liefde Schoemaker	3:33.36	
7	2	Ethiopia	Banchalem Bikese, Rachel Tesfaye, Genet Ayele, Ajayeba Aliye	3:39.62	

=== Final ===
The final was held on 3 May 2026, starting at 16:40 in the afternoon.

Rank	Lane	Nation	Competitors	Time	Notes
1st place, gold medalist(s)	4	Norway	Josefine Tomine Eriksen Aks, Amalie Iuel, Astri Ertzgaard, Henriette Jæger	3:20.96	WL, NR
2nd place, silver medalist(s)	6	Spain	Paula Sevilla, Ana Prieto, Rocío Arroyo, Blanca Hervás	3:21.25	NR
3rd place, bronze medalist(s)	5	Canada	Zoe Sherar, Lauren Gale, Jasneet Nijjar, Savannah Sutherland	3:22.66	SB
4	7	Great Britain	Laviai Nielsen, Nicole Yeargin, Poppy Malik Charlotte Henrich	3:22.77	
5	2	Netherlands	Nina Franke, Lieke Klaver, Myrte van der Schoot, Eveline Saalberg	3:23.12	SB
6	8	Italy	Rebecca Borga, Virginia Troiani, Alessandra Bonora, Alice Mangione	3:23.40	NR
7	3	Czech Republic	Barbora Malíková, Nikola Bisová, Terezie Táborská, Lurdes Gloria Manuel	3:28.97	
8	1	Germany	Eileen Demes, Luna Bulmahn, Annkathrin Hoven, Irina Gorr	3:29.37	
