= 2026 European Athletics Championships – Women's 4 × 400 metres relay =

Women's 4 × 400 metres relay at the 2026 European Athletics Championships
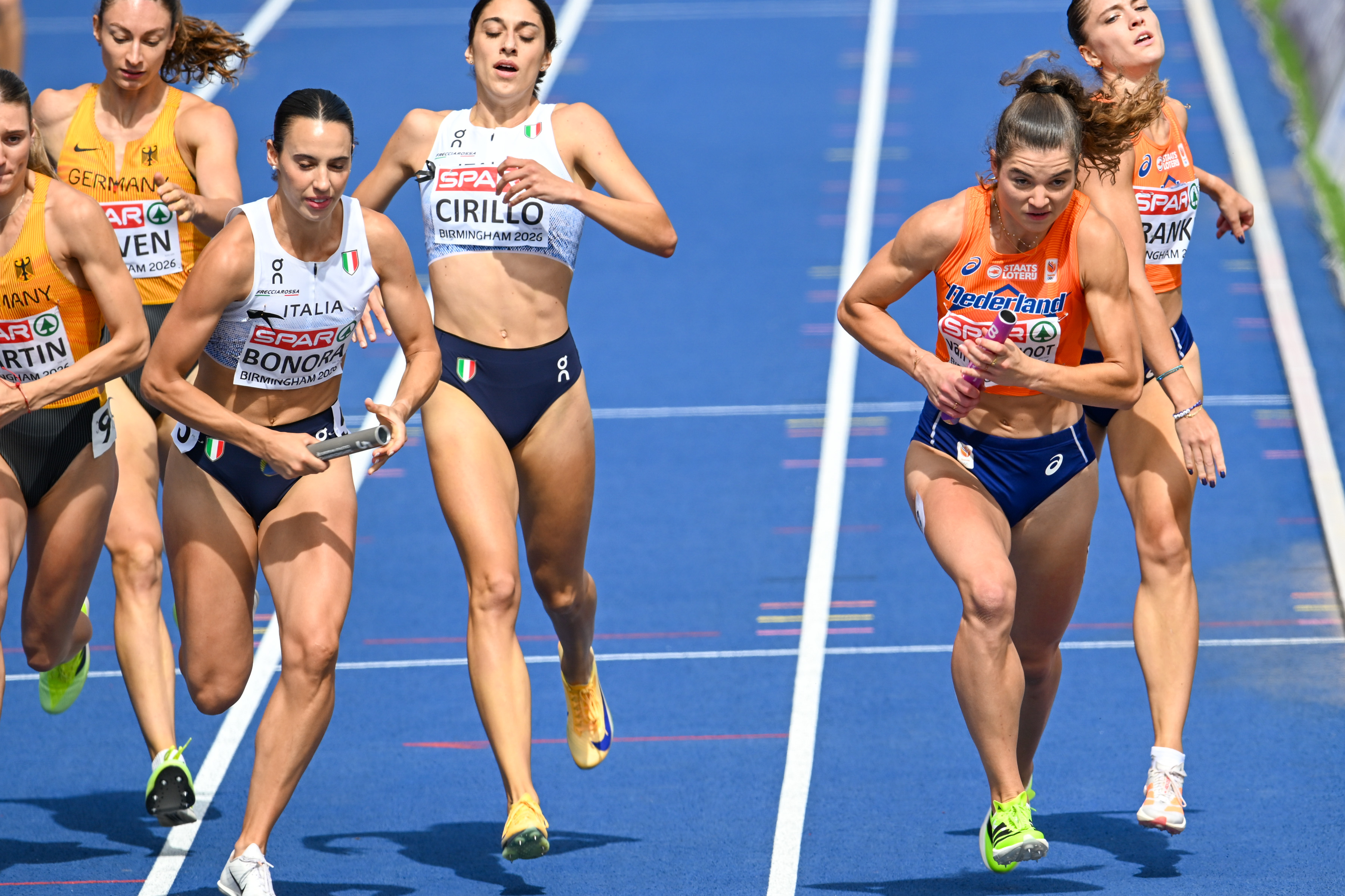
- A phase of a heat
- Venue: Alexander Stadium
- Location: Birmingham, United Kingdom
- Dates: 14 August 2026 (round 1); 16 August 2026 (final)
- Nations: 16
- Winning time: 3:21.10

Medalists
gold medal	Myrte van der Schoot; Lieke Klaver; Eveline Saalberg; Femke Broeders-Bol; Vanessa Mercera; Nina Franke	Netherlands
silver medal	Yemi Mary John; Lina Nielsen; Nicole Yeargin; Emily Newnham; Charlotte Henrich	Great Britain
bronze medal	Alessandra Bonora; Anna Polinari; Alice Mangione; Eloisa Coiro; Ilaria Elvira Accame; Sara Cirillo	Italy

The women's 4 × 400 metres relay at the 2026 European Athletics Championships took place over two rounds at the Alexander Stadium in Birmingham, United Kingdom, on 14 and 16 August 2026.

== Background ==
Records before the 2026 European Athletics Championships
Record	Athlete (nation)	Time	Location	Date
World record	Soviet Union (Tatyana Ledovskaya, Olga Nazarova, Mariya Pinigina, Olga Bryzgina)	3:15.17	Seoul, South Korea	1 October 1988
European record	Soviet Union (Tatyana Ledovskaya, Olga Nazarova, Mariya Pinigina, Olga Bryzgina)	3:15.17	Seoul, South Korea	1 October 1988
Championship record	East Germany (Kirsten Emmelmann, Sabine Busch, Petra Müller, Marita Koch)	3:16.87	Stuttgart, West Germany	31 August 1986
World leading	Arkansas Razorbacks (Sanaria Butler, Analisse Batista, Kaylyn Brown, Sanu Jallow)	3:18.88	Eugene, United States	13 June 2026
European leading	Norway (Josefine Tomine Eriksen, Amalie Iuel, Astri Ertzgaard, Henriette Jæger)	3:20.96	Gaborone, Botswana	3 May 2026

== Qualification ==
For the women's 4 × 400 metres relay, the qualification period is from 1 January 2025 to 26 July 2026. The qualification procedure will be based on the aggregate of the two fastest times achieved by national teams in the qualification period. For being ranked, the results of relay races shall be valid only on condition that they are part of a competition staged in compliance with World Athletics Rules (and included into World Athletics Global Calendar) and that at least 2 international teams, representing at least 2 countries compete in the race. A total of 16 national teams can compete in the event. Host nation Great Britain has the right to be represented with one national team in the event. If they wish to participate and are not qualified as indicated above, the number of national teams to qualify will be reduced to 15.

Qualification standings per 31 July 2026
QP	Country	Athletes	Status	Accumulated times	Result 1	Result 2
1	Great Britain & N.I.		Allocated to Host Country			
2	Netherlands		Qualified by European Ranking	6:43.30	3:20.18	3:23.12
3	Norway		Qualified by European Ranking	6:43.74	3:20.96	3:22.78
4	Spain		Qualified by European Ranking	6:45.38	3:21.25	3:24.13
5	Belgium		Qualified by European Ranking	6:46.11	3:22.15	3:23.96
6	Poland		Qualified by European Ranking	6:47.30	3:22.91	3:24.39
7	Italy		Qualified by European Ranking	6:47.86	3:23.40	3:24.46
8	France		Qualified by European Ranking	6:48.41	3:24.08	3:24.33
9	Ireland		Qualified by European Ranking	6:48.52	3:23.83	3:24.69
10	Czech Republic		Qualified by European Ranking	6:50.73	3:25.42	3:25.31
11	Germany		Qualified by European Ranking	6:51.09	3:25.33	3:25.76
12	Switzerland		Qualified by European Ranking	6:58.84	3:27.46	3:31.38
13	Slovakia		Qualified by European Ranking	7:02.64	3:29.87	3:32.77
14	Finland		Qualified by European Ranking	7:04.41	3:32.10	3:32.31
15	Portugal		Qualified by European Ranking	7:04.53	3:33.16	3:31.37
16	Slovenia		Qualified by European Ranking	7:04.54	3:31.83	3:32.71

== Results ==
=== Round 1 ===
Round 1 was held on 14 August 2026, at 11:35 (UTC+1) in the morning. First 3 in each heat (Q) and the next 2 fastest (q) advanced to the final.

==== Heat 1 ====
Results of heat 1 of round 1
Place	Lane	Nation	Athletes	Time	Notes
1	4	Great Britain & N.I.	Emily Newnham, Lina Nielsen, Charlotte Henrich, Nicole Yeargin	3:22.25	Q
2	6	Spain	Ana Prieto, Herminia Parra, Rocío Arroyo, Blanca Hervás	3:26.41	Q
3	7	France	Isabelle Black, Orianna Chéry, Marina Lasserre, Louise Maraval	3:26.44	Q
4	2	Belgium	Paulien Couckuyt, Kylie Lambert, Camille Laus, Helena Ponette	3:26.59	q, SB
5	5	Poland	Anna Gryc, Alicja Wrona-Kutrzepa, Kinga Gacka, Anastazja Kuś	3:26.92	q
6	9	Slovakia	Viktória Korbová, Emma Zapletalová, Gabriela Gajanová, Daniela Ledecká	3:27.02	NR
7	3	Finland	Heidi Salminen, Hilla Uusimäki, Aino Pulkkinen, Veera Mattila	3:30.54	SB
8	8	Ireland	Sophie Becker, Jenna Breen, Cliodhna Manning, Arlene Crossan	3:32.58	

==== Heat 2 ====
Results of heat 2 of round 1
Place	Lane	Nation	Athletes	Time	Notes
1	8	Netherlands	Vanessa Mercera, Eveline Saalberg, Nina Franke, Myrte van der Schoot	3:25.00	Q
2	5	Italy	Ilaria Elvira Accame, Anna Polinari, Sara Cirillo, Alessandra Bonora	3:25.99	Q
3	9	Germany	Irina Gorr, Jana Lakner, Annkathrin Hoven, Johanna Martin	3:26.24	Q
4	4	Norway	Josefine Tomine Eriksen Aks, Astri Ertzgaard, Kaitesi Ertzgaard, Amalie Iuel	3:27.71	
5	7	Czech Republic	Tereza Petržilková, Lada Vondrová, Nikola Bisová, Barbora Malíková	3:29.47	
6	3	Switzerland	Melanie Roland, Lena Wernli, Annina Fahr, Yasmin Giger	3:30.12	SB
7	6	Portugal	Carina Vanessa, Sofia Lavreshina, Clara Martinha, Fatoumata Binta Diallo	3:31.24	SB
8	2	Slovenia	Ajda Kaucic, Anita Horvat, Maja Pogorevc, Maša Medjimurec	3:35.82	

=== Final ===
The final was held on 16 August 2026, at 21:33 (UTC+1) in the evening.

Results of the final
Place	Lane	Nation	Athletes	Time	Notes
1st place, gold medalist(s)	7	Netherlands	Myrte van der Schoot, Lieke Klaver, Eveline Saalberg, Femke Broeders-Bol	3:21.10	SB
2nd place, silver medalist(s)	5	Great Britain & N.I.	Yemi Mary John, Lina Nielsen, Nicole Yeargin, Emily Newnham	3:21.68	
3rd place, bronze medalist(s)	8	Italy	Alessandra Bonora, Anna Polinari, Alice Mangione, Eloisa Coiro	3:23.57	
4	6	Spain	Paula Sevilla, Ana Prieto, Rocío Arroyo, Blanca Hervás	3:24.39	
5	9	France	Isabelle Black, Gémima Joseph, Marina Lasserre, Louise Maraval	3:24.50	
6	3	Belgium	Paulien Couckuyt, Helena Ponette, Camille Laus, Ilana Hanssens	3:25.19	SB
7	2	Poland	Anna Gryc, Kinga Gacka, Izabela Smolińska, Anastazja Kuś	3:27.63	
8	4	Germany	Irina Gorr, Jana Lakner, Luna Bredau, Johanna Martin	3:28.90	
