= Athletics at the 2024 Summer Olympics – Women's 4 × 400 metres relay =

Women's 4 × 400 metres relay at the Games of the XXXIII Olympiad
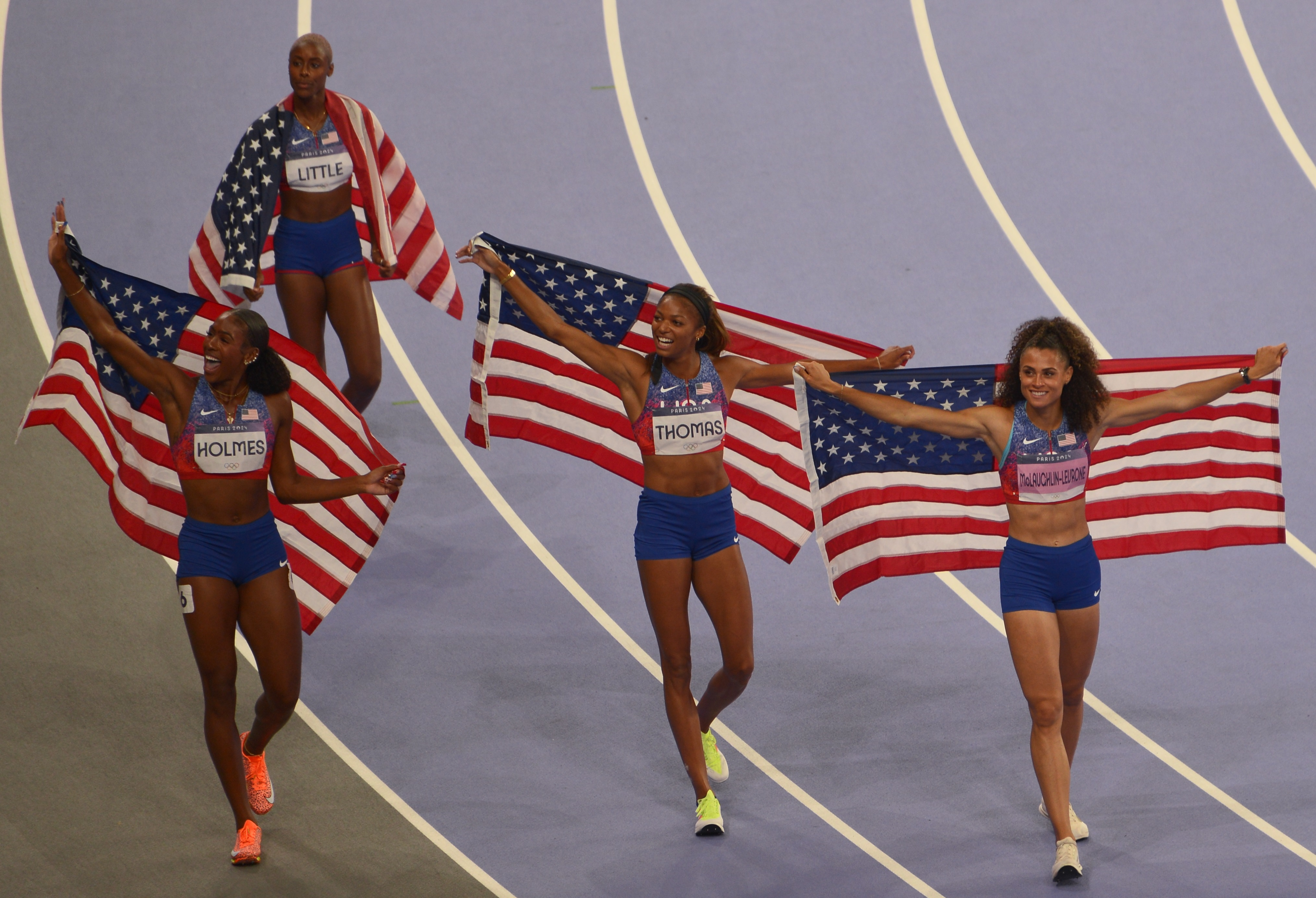
- The four athletes of the United States on the tracks after their victory in the final
- Venue: Stade de France; Saint-Denis, France
- Dates: 9 August 2024 (round 1); 10 August 2024 (final)
- Winning time: 3:15.27 min AR

Medalists
1st place, gold medalist(s)		Shamier Little, Sydney McLaughlin-Levrone, Gabrielle Thomas, Alexis Holmes, Quanera Hayes, (Note: This athlete competed in round 1, but was replaced in the final.) Aaliyah Butler, Kaylyn Brown	United States
2nd place, silver medalist(s)		Lieke Klaver, Cathelijn Peeters, Lisanne de Witte, Femke Bol, Eveline Saalberg, Myrte van der Schoot	Netherlands
3rd place, bronze medalist(s)		Victoria Ohuruogu, Laviai Nielsen, Nicole Yeargin, Amber Anning, Yemi Mary John, Hannah Kelly, Jodie Williams, Lina Nielsen	Great Britain

The women's 4 × 400 metres relay at the 2024 Summer Olympics was held over two rounds at the Stade de France in Saint-Denis, France, on 9 and 10 August 2024. This was the fourteenth time that this event was contested at the Summer Olympics.

Sixteen teams qualified through the 2024 World Athletics Relays or by their ranking on the World Athletics top list. From round 1, eight teams advanced to the final the next day.

The final was won by the team of the United States in an area record of 3:15.27 minutes, followed by the team of the Netherlands in a national record of 3:19.50 min in second place and the team of Great Britain in a national record of 3:19.72 min in third place.

== Background ==
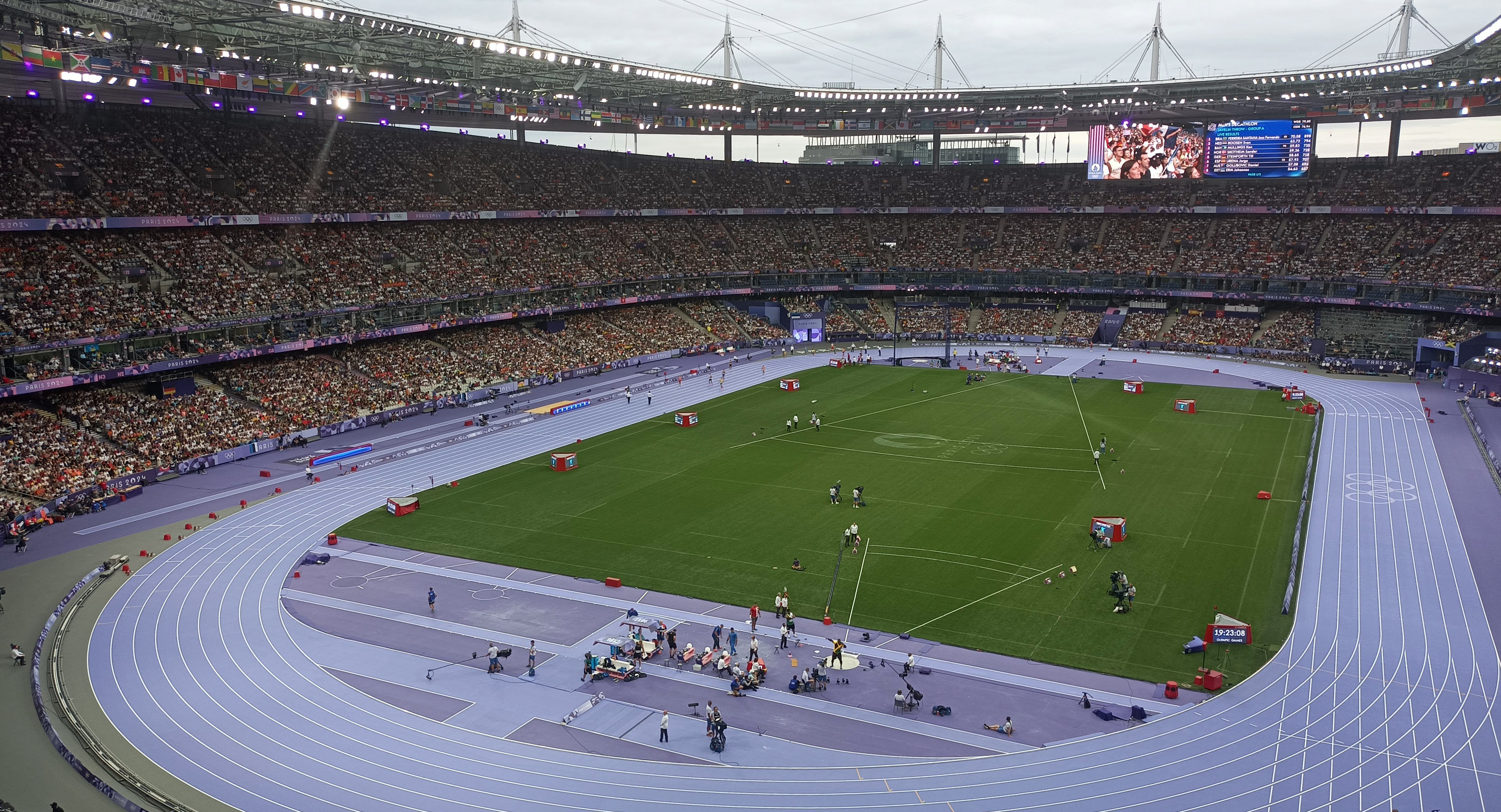
Stade de France in August 2024

The 4 × 400 metres relay at the Summer Olympics is the longest track relay event held at the multi-sport event. The women's relay has been present on the Olympic athletics programme since 1972 and was contested thirteen times before 2024.

The USA has finished no worse than silver at every Olympics since the 4 × 400 has been on the program, except at the boycotted 1980 games. They have won every gold since 1996. Jamaica has medaled in every Olympics since 2000, behind the USA.

The event was held at the Stade de France in Saint-Denis, France, which is part of the Paris metropolitan area. The stadium was built for the 1998 FIFA World Cup. During the 2024 Summer Olympics, it had a capacity of 77,083 spectators.

Global records before the 2024 Summer Olympics
Record	Nation (athletes)	Time	Location	Date
World record	Soviet Union (Tatyana Ledovskaya, Olga Nazarova, Mariya Pinigina, Olga Bryzgina)	3:15.17	Seoul, South Korea	1 October 1988
Olympic record	Soviet Union (Tatyana Ledovskaya, Olga Nazarova, Mariya Pinigina, Olga Bryzgina)	3:15.17	Seoul, South Korea	1 October 1988
World leading	Arkansas Razorbacks (Amber Anning, Rosey Effiong, Nickisha Pryce, Kaylyn Brown)	3:17.96	Eugene, Oregon, United States	8 June 2024

Area records before the 2024 Summer Olympics
Record	Nation (athletes)	Time	Location	Date
African record	Nigeria (Olabisi Afolabi, Fatimat Yusuf, Charity Opara, Falilat Ogunkoya-Osheku)	3:21.04	Atlanta, Georgia, United States	3 August 1996
Asian record	China (An Xiaohong, Bai Xiaoyun, Cao Chunying, Ma Yuqin)	3:24.28	Beijing, China	13 September 1993
European record	Soviet Union (Tatyana Ledovskaya, Olga Nazarova, Mariya Pinigina, Olga Bryzgina)	3:15.17	Seoul, South Korea	1 October 1988
North, Central American and Caribbean record	United States (Denean Howard-Hill, Diane Dixon, Valerie Brisco-Hooks, Florence Griffith-Joyner)	3:15.51	Seoul, South Korea	1 October 1988
Oceanian record	Australia (Nova Peris-Kneebone, Tamsyn Manou, Melinda Gainsford-Taylor, Cathy Freeman)	3:23.81	Sydney, Australia	30 September 2000
South American record	Brazil (Geisa Coutinho, Barbara de Oliveira, Joelma Sousa, Jailma de Lima)	3:26.68	São Paulo, Brazil	7 August 2011

== Qualification ==
For this event, fourteen teams qualified during the women's 4 × 400 metres relay at the 2024 World Athletics Relays. The remaining two spots were awarded to the teams with the highest ranking on the World Athletics top list. The qualification period is between 1 July 2023 and 30 June 2024.

Qualification event	No. of teams	Qualified teams
2024 World Athletics Relays – Women's 4 × 400 metres relay	14	Belgium; Canada; France; Great Britain; India; Ireland; Italy; Jamaica; Netherlands; Norway; Poland; Spain; Switzerland; United States
World Athletics top list (as of June 30, 2024)	2	Cuba; Germany
Total	16	

== Results ==
=== Round 1 ===
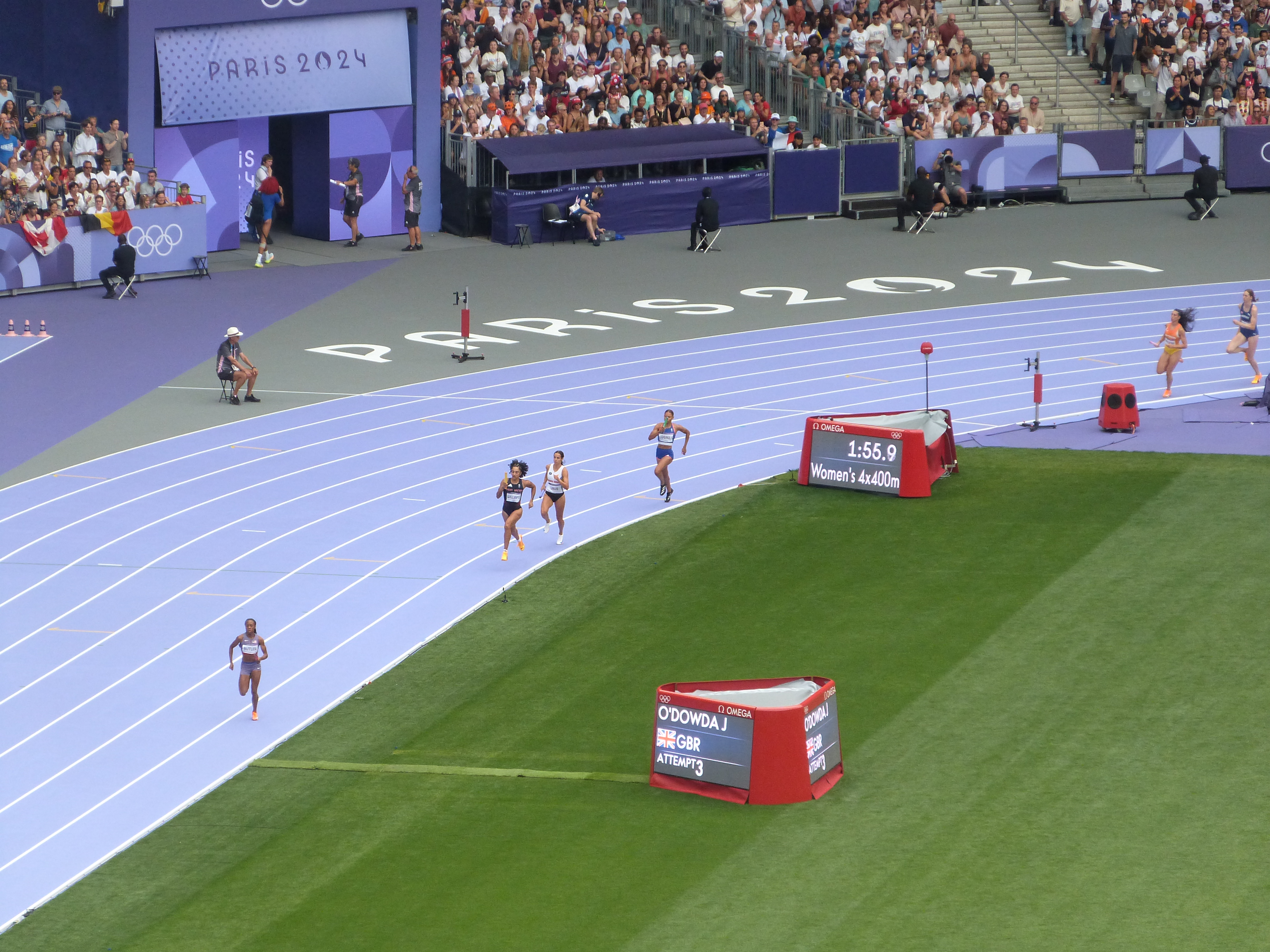
Third-leg runners coming out of the first bend during the first heat of round 1

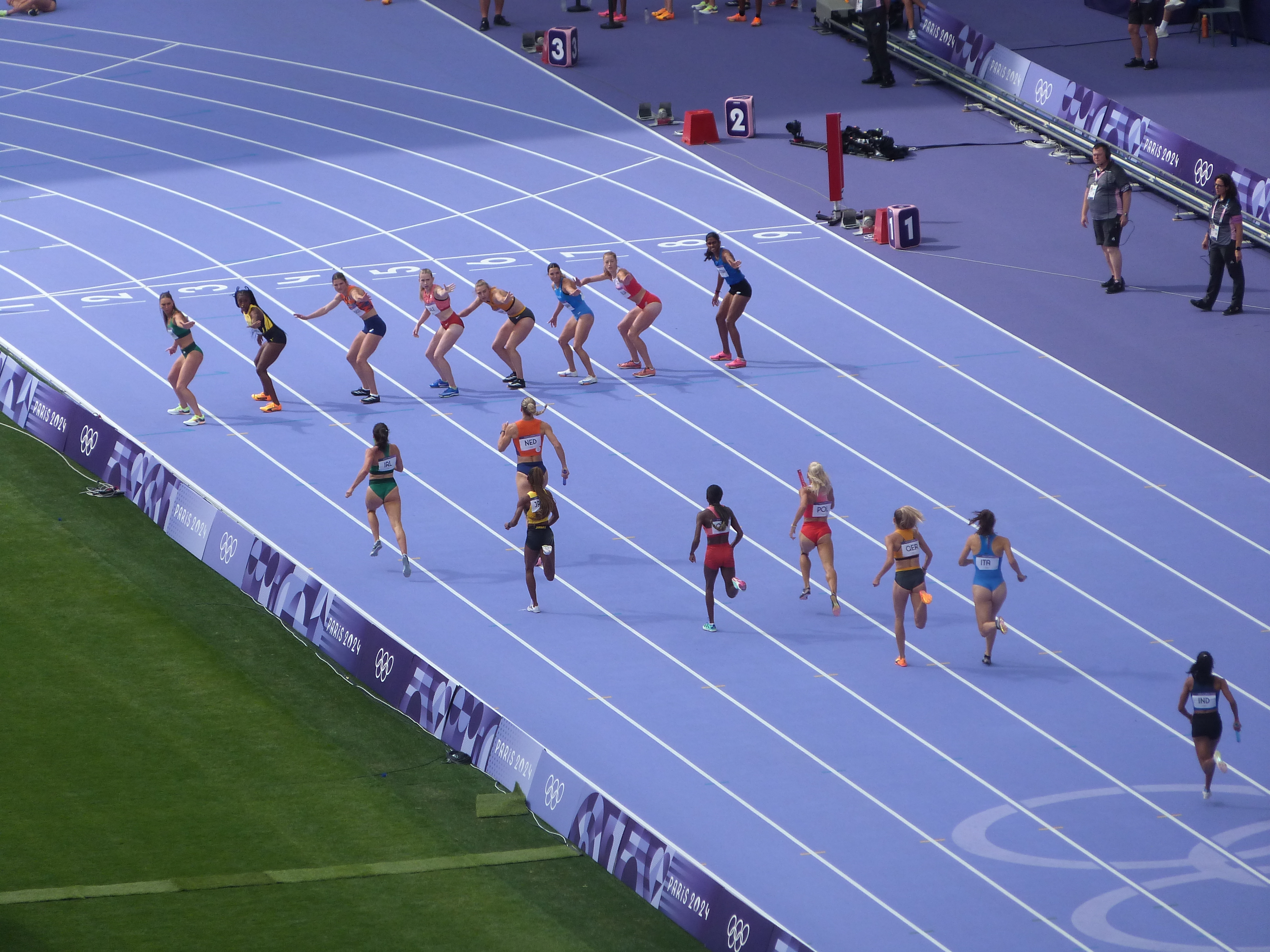
Third-leg runners approaching the final hand-over during the second heat of round 1

Round 1 was held on 9 August and started at 10:40 (UTC+2) in the morning.

The USA's team qualified in the heats with 3:21.44 min, running 3 seconds faster than the next-best team, with the team of Great Britain behind them in the first heat. All the other qualifying teams were evenly matched, spread across a little over a second. The Canadian team was the slowest qualifier with 3:25.77 min.

Results of the first heat of round 1
Rank	Lane	Nation	Competitors	Reaction	Time	Notes
1	6	United States	Quanera Hayes, Shamier Little, Aaliyah Butler, Kaylyn Brown	0.243	3:21.44	Q, SB
2	7	Great Britain	Yemi Mary John, Hannah Kelly, Jodie Williams, Lina Nielsen	0.202	3:24.72	Q, SB
3	8	France	Sounkamba Sylla, Shana Grebo, Alexe Déau, Amandine Brossier	0.172	3:24.73	Q
4	4	Belgium	Hanne Claes, Imke Vervaet, Camille Laus, Helena Ponette	0.226	3:24.92	q
5	9	Spain	Blanca Hervás, Berta Segura, Eva Santidrián, Carmen Avilés	0.151	3:28.29	
6	5	Norway	Josefine Tomine Eriksen, Lakeri Ertzgaard, Elisabeth Slettum, Amalie Iuel	0.172	3:28.61	
7	2	Switzerland	Giulia Senn, Julia Niederberger, Annina Fahr, Yasmin Giger	0.150	3:29.75	
8	3	Cuba	Melissa Padrón, Daily Cooper Gaspar, Sahily Diago, Roxana Gómez	0.244	3:33.99	

Results of the second heat of round 1
Rank	Lane	Nation	Competitors	Reaction	Time	Notes
1	9	Jamaica	Andrenette Knight, Ashley Williams, Charokee Young, Stephenie Ann McPherson	0.182	3:24.92	Q, SB
2	4	Netherlands	Eveline Saalberg, Lieke Klaver, Myrte van der Schoot, Lisanne de Witte	0.195	3:25.03	Q
3	8	Ireland	Sophie Becker, Phil Healy, Kelly McGrory, Sharlene Mawdsley	0.204	3:25.05	Q
4	7	Canada	Zoe Sherar, Aiyanna Stiverne, Lauren Gale, Kyra Constantine	0.162	3:25.77	q
5	5	Italy	Ilaria Accame, Anna Polinari, Giancarla Trevisan, Alice Mangione	0.235	3:26.50	
6	6	Poland	Anastazja Kuś, Justyna Święty-Ersetic, Aleksandra Formella, Alicja Wrona-Kutrzepa	0.172	3:26.69	
7	3	Germany	Skadi Schier, Alica Schmidt, Mona Mayer, Eileen Demes	0.150	3:26.95	
8	2	India	Vithya Ramraj, Jyothika Sri Dandi, M. R. Poovamma, Subha Venkatesan	0.175	3:32.51	

=== Final ===
The final was held on 10 August and started at 21:22 (UTC+2) in the evening.

For the final, the USA replaced three of the team members, Quanera Hayes, Aaliyah Butler and Kaylyn Brown in the heats, with 400 metres hurdle champion and world record holder, Sydney McLaughlin-Levrone, 200 metre champion Gabrielle Thomas and Alexis Holmes. Shamier Little was the lone carry over.

Coming out of the blocks. Stacey-Ann Williams took the early lead for Jamaica in lane 8, almost swallowing up the entire three-turn stagger gap to France's Sounkamba Sylla to her outside before the end of the backstretch. Williams came onto the home stretch with a 5-metre lead (deceived by the additional turn of stagger), but Williams would slow on her final 100 m. Running a more controlled pace to her inside, Little and Lieke Klaver of the Netherlands gained that last 100, Little passing the baton to McLaughlin-Levrone clearly in the lead, who extended the lead close to 15 metres on the field by the break line. Andrenette Knight of Jamaica had a slight lead on Cathelijn Peeters of the Netherlands, but Ireland had put their star Rhasidat Adeleke on their second leg. Adeleke moved into third before the end of the straightaway. As she was passing Knight on the curve, Knight stopped running due to a dropped baton, resulting in disqualification. By the end of her leg, McLaughlin-Levrone handed off to Thomas with almost 30 metres on Adeleke who in turn had 5 metres on a tightening group consisting of the Netherlands, Great Britain, Canada, Belgium, and France. McLaughlin-Levrone's relay split of 47.71 s was the third fastest relay split in history. As Thomas took the baton, she didn't let off the gas, adding just a little more to the American lead. Great Britain's Nicole Yeargin overtook Ireland's Phil Healy going into the final handoff. Holmes of the USA kept the pressure on to hold onto every inch of that huge lead. In pursuit, Great Britain had Amber Anning, part of the University of Arkansas super sweep at the NCAA meet; Ireland had Sharlene Mawdsley, who had already produced a 49.40 s split earlier in the year; and the Netherlands had Femke Bol. Holmes pressed all the way to the finish, with the USA winning with 3:15.27 min, coming just 0.1 second short of the Soviet 1988 world record. Behind her, Mawdsley regained Ireland's advantage on the handoff, holding Anning to the outside through the penultimate turn, but Anning got ahead on the backstretch. Closing behind was Bol, passing Mawdsley then Anning to take silver for the Netherlands. Mawdsley tried to follow Bol past Anning but didn't get there, and Great Britain took the bronze.

The American team improved upon the American and North American Record of the USA at the 1988 Olympics, anchored by FloJo in 48.0 s. The next four teams each set National Records. In addition to McLaughlin-Levrone 's split, Bol's anchor was automatically timed in 48.00 s, the ninth fastest in history. For Little, primarily a 400 metres hurdler, #7 of all time, this was her second relay medal at these Olympics. This one gold was her first appearance after failing to qualify against the tidal wave of McLaughlin-Levrone and Dalilah Muhammad since 2016.

Results of the final
Rank	Lane	Nation	Competitors	Reaction	Time	Notes
1st place, gold medalist(s)	6	United States	Shamier Little, Sydney McLaughlin-Levrone, Gabrielle Thomas, Alexis Holmes	0.198	3:15.27	WL, AR
2nd place, silver medalist(s)	5	Netherlands	Lieke Klaver, Cathelijn Peeters, Lisanne de Witte, Femke Bol	0.191	3:19.50	NR
3rd place, bronze medalist(s)	7	Great Britain	Victoria Ohuruogu, Laviai Nielsen, Nicole Yeargin, Amber Anning	0.200	3:19.72	NR
4	4	Ireland	Sophie Becker, Rhasidat Adeleke, Phil Healy, Sharlene Mawdsley	0.207	3:19.90	NR
5	9	France	Sounkamba Sylla, Shana Grebo, Amandine Brossier, Louise Maraval	0.196	3:21.41	NR
6	2	Canada	Zoe Sherar, Savannah Sutherland, Kyra Constantine, Lauren Gale	0.156	3:22.01	SB
7	3	Belgium	Naomi Van den Broeck, Imke Vervaet, Hanne Claes, Helena Ponette	0.136	3:22.40	SB
–	8	Jamaica	Stacey Ann Williams, Andrenette Knight, Shiann Salmon, Stephenie Ann McPherson	0.153	DNF	
