= 2026 European Athletics Championships – Women's 400 metres =

Women's 400 metres at the 2026 European Athletics Championships
- Venue: Alexander Stadium
- Location: Birmingham, United Kingdom
- Dates: 12 August 2026 (round 1); 13 August 2026 (semi-finals); 15 August 2026 (final)
- Competitors: 36 (target)
- Winning time: 49.04 EL, NR

Medalists
gold medal	Henriette Jæger	Norway
silver medal	Natalia Bukowiecka	Poland
bronze medal	Lieke Klaver	Netherlands

The women's 400 metres at the 2026 European Athletics Championships took place over three rounds at the Alexander Stadium in Birmingham, United Kingdom, from 12 to 15 August 2026.

== Background ==
Records before the 2026 European Athletics Championships
Record	Athlete (nation)	Time	Location	Date
World record	Marita Koch (GDR)	47.60	Canberra, Australia	6 October 1985
European record	Marita Koch (GDR)	47.60	Canberra, Australia	6 October 1985
Championship record	Marita Koch (GDR)	48.16	Athens, Greece	8 September 1982
World leading	Marileidy Paulino (DOM)	48.48	Paris, France	28 June 2026
European leading	Henriette Jæger (NOR)	49.15	London, United Kingdom	18 July 2026

== Qualification ==
For the women's 400 metres, the qualification period was from 27 July 2025 to 26 July 2026. Athletes qualified by running the entry standard of 51.20 or faster, by wildcard for the 2024 European Athletics Champion, or by their position on the World Athletics Rankings for the event. The target number was 36 athletes.

Qualification standings per 31 July 2026
QP	CP	Country	Athlete	PB	SB	Status	Details
1	1	Poland	Natalia Bukowiecka	48.90	50.02	Qualified by Wild Card	Defending European Champion
2	1	Norway	Henriette Jæger	49.15	49.15	Qualified by Entry Standard	49.15 - Olympic Stadium, London (GBR) - 18 JUL 2026
3	1	Great Britain & N.I.	Amber Anning	49.29	50.16	Qualified by Entry Standard	49.36 - National Stadium, Tokyo (JPN) - 18 SEP 2025
4	1	Czech Republic	Lurdes Gloria Manuel	49.37	49.37	Qualified by Entry Standard	49.37 - Stade Charléty, Paris (FRA) - 28 JUN 2026
5	1	Netherlands	Lieke Klaver	49.58	49.58	Qualified by Entry Standard	49.58 - Stade Louis II, Monaco (MON) - 10 JUL 2026
6	2	Great Britain & N.I.	Yemi Mary John	49.85	49.85	Qualified by Entry Standard	49.85 - National Stadium, Tokyo (JPN) - 17 MAY 2026
7	1	Ireland	Sharlene Mawdsley	50.06	50.06	Qualified by Entry Standard	50.06 - Stade Charléty, Paris (FRA) - 28 JUN 2026
8	1	Italy	Anna Polinari	50.36	50.36	Qualified by Entry Standard	50.36 - Estadio Vallehermoso, Madrid (ESP) - 16 JUL 2026
9	3	Great Britain & N.I.	Charlotte Henrich	50.45	50.45	Qualified by Entry Standard	50.45 - Olympic Stadium, London (GBR) - 18 JUL 2026
10	1	Spain	Blanca Hervás	50.46	50.46	Qualified by Entry Standard	50.46 - Estadio Vallehermoso, Madrid (ESP) - 16 JUL 2026
11	1	France	Isabelle Black	50.47	50.47	Qualified by Entry Standard	50.47 - Stadium Municipal, Albi (FRA) - 24 JUL 2026
12	1	Germany	Johanna Martin	50.57	50.57	Qualified by Entry Standard	50.57 - Lohrheidestadion, Wattenscheid, Bochum (GER) - 03 JUL 2026
13	2	Spain	Paula Sevilla	50.68	50.68	Qualified by Entry Standard	50.68 - Estadio Vallehermoso, Madrid (ESP) - 16 JUL 2026
14	1	Belgium	Helena Ponette	50.80	50.80	Qualified by Entry Standard	50.80 - Atletiekarena Gaston Roelants, Kessel-Lo (BEL) - 25 JUL 2026
15	1	Romania	Andrea Eșanu-Miklós	50.54	51.79	Qualified by Entry Standard	50.90 - National Stadium, Tokyo (JPN) - 16 SEP 2025
reserve	4	Great Britain & N.I.	Nicole Yeargin	50.96	50.98	Qualified by Entry Standard	50.98 - Foote Field, Edmonton (CAN) - 12 JUL 2026
reserve	5	Great Britain & N.I.	Laviai Nielsen	49.87	51.02	Qualified by Entry Standard	51.02 - Cushing Stadium, College Station, TX (USA) - 06 JUN 2026
16	2	Netherlands	Myrte van der Schoot	51.05	51.05	Qualified by Entry Standard	51.05 - Stadion De Veen, Heusden-Zolder (BEL) - 18 JUL 2026
17	1	Finland	Mette Baas	51.42	51.42	Qualified by World Rankings	20th - 1193 points
18	1	Austria	Susanne Gogl-Walli	50.60	51.77	Qualified by World Rankings	22nd - 1187 points
19	2	Norway	Josefine Tomine Eriksen Aks	51.43	51.43	Qualified by World Rankings	23rd - 1187 points
20	3	Netherlands	Eveline Saalberg	50.95	51.52	Qualified by World Rankings	25th - 1182 points
21	2	Czech Republic	Barbora Malíková	51.23	51.59	Qualified by World Rankings	28th - 1176 points
22	1	Croatia	Veronika Drljačić	51.22	51.90	Qualified by World Rankings	31st - 1174 points
23	2	Italy	Alessandra Bonora	51.70	51.70	Qualified by World Rankings	33rd - 1173 points
24	3	Italy	Alice Mangione	51.07	51.49	Qualified by World Rankings	34th - 1171 points
25	3	Norway	Astri Ertzgaard	51.92	52.37	Qualified by World Rankings	37th - 1163 points
26	2	Ireland	Sophie Becker	51.13	52.36	Qualified by World Rankings	38th - 1159 points
27	3	Spain	Ana Prieto	51.62	51.62	Qualified by World Rankings	42nd - 1153 points
28	1	Lithuania	Modesta Justė Morauskaitė	50.49	52.66	Qualified by World Rankings	48th - 1141 points
29	1	Sweden	Elna Wester	52.32	52.66	Qualified by World Rankings	54th - 1135 points
30	1	Switzerland	Melanie Roland	52.15	52.15	Qualified by World Rankings	55th - 1132 points
31	3	Ireland	Rachel McCann	52.89	52.89	Qualified by World Rankings	56th - 1132 points
reserve	4	Italy	Sara Cirillo	51.86	51.86	Qualified by World Rankings	57th - 1132 points
32	1	Turkey	Sila Koloğlu	52.41	52.41	Qualified by World Rankings	71st - 1121 points
33	2	Turkey	Elif Polat	53.03	53.03	Qualified by World Rankings	73rd - 1120 points
reserve	5	Italy	Ilaria Elvira Accame	51.98	52.34	Qualified by World Rankings	76th - 1119 points
reserve	4	Norway	Kaitesi Ertzgaard	52.30	52.30	Qualified by World Rankings	78th - 1119 points
34	1	Serbia	Aleksandra Pešić	52.69	52.69	Qualified by World Rankings	84th - 1116 points
35	1	Portugal	Carina Vanessa	52.62	53.42	Qualified by World Rankings	93rd - 1109 points
36	1	Cyprus	Kalliopi Kountouri	52.58	53.54	Qualified by World Rankings	95th - 1108 points

Bye to semi-finals	Reserve activated	Withdrawal / reserve unused

== Schedule ==
Date	Time	Round
12 August 2026	11:05	Round 1
13 August 2026	12:45	Semi-finals
15 August 2026	20:50	Final

All times are local times (UTC+1)

== Results ==
=== Round 1 ===
Round 1 was held on 12 August 2026, at 11:05 in the morning. 13 best performers (q) advanced to the semi-finals.

==== Heat 1 ====
Place	Lane	Athlete	Nation	Time	Notes
1	6	Eveline Saalberg	Netherlands	51.65	q
2	5	Paula Sevilla	Spain	51.78	q
3	7	Sophie Becker	Ireland	52.28	q, SB
4	8	Melanie Roland	Switzerland	52.35	
5	4	Barbora Malíková	Czech Republic	52.43	
6	2	Carina Vanessa	Portugal	54.20	
7	3	Kalliopi Kountouri	Cyprus	54.45	

==== Heat 2 ====
Place	Lane	Athlete	Nation	Time	Notes
1	4	Helena Ponette	Belgium	51.56	q
2	3	Ana Prieto	Spain	51.81	q
3	5	Alice Mangione	Italy	51.96	q
4	8	Veronika Drljačić	Croatia	52.07	q
5	7	Aleksandra Pešić	Serbia	52.55	PB
6	6	Astri Ertzgaard	Norway	52.71	

==== Heat 3 ====
Place	Lane	Athlete	Nation	Time	Notes
1	6	Josefine Tomine Eriksen Aks	Norway	50.83	q, PB
2	7	Myrte van der Schoot	Netherlands	51.21	q
3	4	Alessandra Bonora	Italy	51.27	q, PB
4	3	Modesta Justė Morauskaitė	Lithuania	51.64	q, SB
5	8	Susanne Gogl-Walli	Austria	52.12	q
6	5	Elna Wester	Sweden	52.28	q, PB

=== Semi-finals ===
The semi-finals were held on 13 August 2026, at 12:45 in the afternoon. First 2 in each heat (Q) and the next 2 fastest (q) advanced to the final.

==== Heat 1 ====
Place	Lane	Athlete	Nation	Time	Notes
1	6	Lieke Klaver	Netherlands	49.71	Q
2	8	Yemi Mari John	Great Britain & N.I.	50.33	Q
3	7	Isabelle Black	France	50.72	
4	5	Blanca Hervás	Spain	51.12	
5	4	Alessandra Bonora	Italy	51.42	
6	9	Josefine Tomine Eriksen Aks	Norway	51.61	
7	3	Veronika Drljačić	Croatia	51.61	SB
8	2	Susanne Gogl-Walli	Austria	52.29	

==== Heat 2 ====
Place	Lane	Athlete	Nation	Time	Notes
1	5	Natalia Bukowiecka	Poland	49.57	Q, SB
2	7	Lurdes Gloria Manuel	Czech Republic	49.81	Q
3	8	Charlotte Henrich	Great Britain & N.I.	50.51	R
4	9	Myrte van der Schoot	Netherlands	50.75	PB
5	6	Johanna Martin	Germany	51.34	
6	4	Alice Mangione	Italy	51.47	SB
7	3	Ana Prieto	Spain	51.69	
8	2	Sophie Becker	Ireland	52.47	

==== Heat 3 ====
Place	Lane	Athlete	Nation	Time	Notes
1	6	Henriette Jæger	Norway	49.80	Q
2	5	Amber Anning	Great Britain & N.I.	49.96	Q (Note: Did not proceed to the final due to injury. Replaced by next best qualifier, Charlotte Henrich.), SB
3	7	Paula Sevilla	Spain	50.21	q, PB
4	8	Helena Ponette	Belgium	50.31	q, PB
5	4	Anna Polinari	Italy	50.62	
6	2	Eveline Saalberg	Netherlands	50.84	PB
7	3	Modesta Justė Morauskaitė	Lithuania	51.72	
8	2	Elna Wester	Sweden	52.02	PB

=== Final ===
The final was held on 15 August 2026, at 20:10 in the evening.

Place	Lane	Athlete	Nation	Time	Notes
1st place, gold medalist(s)	7	Henriette Jæger	Norway	49.04	EL, NR
2nd place, silver medalist(s)	6	Natalia Bukowiecka	Poland	50.04	
3rd place, bronze medalist(s)	5	Lieke Klaver	Netherlands	50.15	
4	8	Lurdes Gloria Manuel	Czech Republic	50.86	
5	4	Yemi Mari John	Great Britain & N.I.	51.12	
6	9	Charlotte Henrich	Great Britain & N.I.	51.29	
7	3	Helena Ponette	Belgium	51.43	
8	2	Paula Sevilla	Spain	52.03	
	9	Amber Anning	Great Britain & N.I.	DNS	
