= 2025 World Athletics Championships – Mixed 4 × 400 metres relay =

Mixed 4 × 400 metres relay at the 2025 World Athletics Championships
- Venue: National Stadium
- Location: Tokyo, Japan
- Date: 13 September
- Competitors: 74 from 17 nations
- Winning time: 3:08.80 =CR

Medalists
gold medal	Bryce Deadmon; Lynna Irby-Jackson; Jenoah McKiver; Alexis Holmes	United States
silver medal	Eugene Omalla; Lieke Klaver; Jonas Phijffers; Femke Bol; Eveline Saalberg*	Netherlands
bronze medal	Dylan Borlée; Imke Vervaet; Alexander Doom; Helena Ponette; Jonathan Sacoor*	Belgium

The mixed 4 × 400 metres relay at the 2025 World Athletics Championships was held at the National Stadium in Tokyo on 13 September 2025.

== Records ==
Before the competition, records were as follows:

Record	Athlete & Nat.	Perf.	Location	Date
World record	United States (Vernon Norwood, Shamier Little, Bryce Deadmon, Kaylyn Brown)	3:07.41	Paris, France	2 August 2024
Championship record	United States (Justin Robinson, Rosey Effiong, Matthew Boling, Alexis Holmes)	3:08.80	Budapest, Hungary	19 August 2023
World leading	Poland (Maksymilian Szwed, Justyna Święty-Ersetic, Daniel Sołtysiak, Natalia Bukowiecka)	3:09.43	Madrid, Spain	29 June 2025
African record	Kenya (Zablon Ekhal Ekwam, Mary Moraa, Kelvin Sane Tauta, Mercy Chebet)	3:11.88	Nairobi, Kenya	15 June 2024
Asian record	Bahrain (Musa Isah, Aminat Jamal, Salwa Eid Naser, Abbas Abubakar Abbas)	3:11.82	Doha, Qatar	29 September 2019
European record	Netherlands (Eugene Omalla, Lieke Klaver, Isaya Klein Ikkink, Femke Bol)	3:07.43	Paris, France	3 August 2024
North, Central American and Caribbean record	United States (Vernon Norwood, Shamier Little, Bryce Deadmon, Kaylyn Brown)	3:07.41	Paris, France	2 August 2024
South American record	Colombia (Nicolás Salinas, Lina Licona, Daniel Balanta, Evelis Aguilar)	3:14.42	Bogotá, Colombia	5 April 2025
Oceanian record	Australia (Luke van Ratingen, Ellie Beer, Terrell Thorne, Carla Bull)	3:17.00	Guangzhou, China	11 May 2025

== Qualification standard ==
First fourteen placed teams at the 2025 World Athletics Relays and the next two highest placed team on year top list.

== Schedule ==
The event schedule, in local time (UTC+9), was as follows:

Date	Time	Round
13 September	11:40	Round 1
13 September	20:20	Final

== Results ==
=== Round 1 ===
The first three in each heat ( Q ) and the next two fastest ( q ) qualified for the final.

Results of round 1
Place	Heat	Nation	Athletes	Time	Notes
1	1	United States	Bryce Deadmon, Lynna Irby-Jackson, Jenoah McKiver, Alexis Holmes	3:10.18	Q
2	1	Great Britain & N.I.	Lewis Davey, Nicole Yeargin, Toby Harries, Yemi Mary John	3:10.22	Q
3	2	Belgium	Jonathan Sacoor, Imke Vervaet, Dylan Borlée, Helena Ponette	3:10.37	Q, SB
4	2	Netherlands	Eugene Omalla, Lieke Klaver, Jonas Phijffers, Eveline Saalberg	3:11.11	Q, SB
5	2	Poland	Maksymilian Szwed, Justyna Święty-Ersetic, Kajetan Duszyński, Anna Gryc	3:11.15	Q
6	1	South Africa	Gardeo Isaacs, Miranda Coetzee, Leendert Koekemoer, Zenéy van der Walt	3:11.16	Q, AR
7	1	Italy	Edoardo Scotti, Anna Polinari, Vladimir Aceti, Alice Mangione	3:11.20	q
8	1	Japan	Kenki Imaizumi, Abigeirufuka Ido, Takuho Yoshizu, Nanako Matsumoto	3:12.08	q, NR
9	2	Spain	Bernat Erta, Paula Sevilla, Julio Arenas, Blanca Hervás	3:12.57	
10	2	Australia	Luke van Ratingen, Mia Gross, Thomas Reynolds, Carla Bull	3:13.46	
11	1	Ireland	Jack Raftery, Sophie Becker, Conor Kelly, Sharlene Mawdsley	3:13.59	
12	1	Germany	Manuel Sanders, Johanna Martin, Emil Agyekum, Elisa Lechleitner	3:13.61	
13	1	Jamaica	Jevaughn Powell, Dejanea Oakley, Zandrion Barnes, Leah Anderson	3:13.96	
14	2	China	Liang Baotang, Mo Jiadie, Liu Kai, Liu Yinglan	3:13.96	
15	2	France	Predea Manounou, Fanny Peltier, Téo Andant, Alexe Déau	3:14.02	
16	1	Canada	Austin Cole, Jasneet Nijjar, Michael Roth, Alyssa Marsh	3:18.94	
	2	Kenya	Brian Tinega, Mercy Oketch, Allan Kipyego, Mary Moraa	DQ	TR17.2.3

=== Final ===
Gardeo Isaacs put South Africa in the lead after the first leg of the race, with the United States' Bryce Deadmon in second and Belgium's Dylan Borlée in third. During the second leg, the United States' Lynna Irby-Jackson moved into the lead. Poland's Natalia Bukowiecka was in second, and Belgium's Imke Vervaet and the Netherlands' Lieke Klaver were tied for third. During the third leg, Jenoah McKiver increased the United States' lead to over one second. Belgium's Alexander Doom was in second, Poland's Kajetan Duszyński was in third, and the Netherlands' Jonas Phijffers was in fourth. During the final leg, Alexis Holmes kept the lead, and the United States won the gold medal with a time of 3:08.80, equaling the championship record they set in 2023. The Netherlands' Femke Bol passed Belgium's Helena Ponette and Poland's Justyna Święty-Ersetic, and the Dutch won silver at 3:09.96. Belgium won bronze at 3:10.61 after Ponette beat Święty-Ersetic to the finish line by two-hundredths of a second.

Results of the final
Rank	Lane	Nation	Athletes	Time	Notes
1st place, gold medalist(s)	5	United States	Bryce Deadmon, Lynna Irby-Jackson, Jenoah McKiver, Alexis Holmes	3:08.80	=CR
2nd place, silver medalist(s)	7	Netherlands	Eugene Omalla, Lieke Klaver, Jonas Phijffers, Femke Bol	3:09.96	SB
3rd place, bronze medalist(s)	8	Belgium	Dylan Borlée, Imke Vervaet, Alexander Doom, Helena Ponette	3:10.61	
4	9	Poland	Maksymilian Szwed, Natalia Bukowiecka, Kajetan Duszyński, Justyna Święty-Ersetic	3:10.63	
5	6	Great Britain & N.I.	Lewis Davey, Emily Newnham, Toby Harries, Nicole Yeargin	3:10.84	
6	4	South Africa	Gardeo Isaacs, Shirley Nekhubui, Leendert Koekemoer, Zenéy van der Walt	3:11.89	
7	2	Italy	Luca Sito, Anna Polinari, Vladimir Aceti, Alice Mangione	3:15.82	
8	3	Japan	Takuho Yoshizu, Abigeirufuka Ido, Kenki Imaizumi, Nanako Matsumoto	3:17.53	
