= Athletics at the 2018 Summer Youth Olympics – Girls' 400 metres =

Girls' 400 metres at the III Summer Youth Olympic Games
- Venue: Parque Polideportivo Roca
- Date: 11 October and 14 October 2018
- Competitors: 25 from 25 nations

Medalists
1st place, gold medalist(s)		Barbora Malíková	Czech Republic
2nd place, silver medalist(s)		Marie Scheppan	Germany
3rd place, bronze medalist(s)		Niddy Mingilishi	Zambia

The girls' 400 metres competition at the 2018 Summer Youth Olympics was held on 11 and 14 October, at the Parque Polideportivo Roca.

== Schedule ==
All times are in local time (UTC-3).

Date	Time	Round
Thursday, 11 October 2018	16:50	Stage 1
Sunday, 14 October 2018	17:05	Stage 2

== Results ==
=== Stage 1 ===
Rank	Heat	Lane	Athlete	Nation	Result	Notes
1	1	5	Barbora Malíková	Czech Republic	54.18	QH4
2	2	4	Marie Scheppan	Germany	54.91	QH4
3	1	4	Niddy Mingilishi	Zambia	55.16	QH4, SB
4	2	6	Erica Geni Barbosa Cavalheiro	Brazil	55.60	QH4
5	2	3	Alina Luchsheva	Belarus	55.93	QH4
6	4	2	Janka Molnar	Hungary	56.00	QH4
7	3	4	Liefde Schoemaker	Belgium	56.14	QH4
8	1	2	Andrea Jiménez	Spain	56.38	QH4
9	4	3	Meghan Hunter	United States	56.83	QH3
10	1	7	Deshana Skeet	Guyana	56.85	QH3
11	4	5	Lorena Itzel Rangel Batres	Mexico	57.08	QH3
12	3	7	Alexandra Zalyubovskaya	Kazakhstan	57.21	QH3
13	4	4	Favour Ofili	Nigeria	57.51	QH3
14	4	7	Ana Costa	Portugal	57.58	QH3
15	2	7	Nataliia Dyshliuk	Ukraine	57.67	QH2
16	2	2	Adina Cîrciogel	Romania	57.76	QH2
17	1	3	Jasneet Nijjar	Canada	57.97	QH2
18	3	6	Kinga Gacka	Poland	58.30	QH2
19	3	2	Ola Buwaro	The Gambia	58.37	QH2
20	2	5	Wang You-hsuan	Chinese Taipei	58.45	QH2
21	3	5	Daniella Deer	Jamaica	1:00.12	QH1
22	1	6	Serenia Ragatu	Fiji	1:00.95	QH2
23	3	3	Megan Moss	Bahamas	1:02.25	QH1
24	4	8	Jiijo Hassan Mohamed	Somalia	1:20.76	QH1, PB
	4	6	Aissata Denn Conte	Guinea	DQ	R 163.3a QH1

=== Stage 2 ===
Rank	Heat	Lane	Athlete	Nation	Result	Notes
1	4	4	Barbora Malíková	Czech Republic	54.68	
2	4	5	Marie Scheppan	Germany	55.15	
3	4	3	Niddy Mingilishi	Zambia	55.32	
4	4	6	Erica Geni Barbosa Cavalheiro	Brazil	55.43	
5	3	7	Favour Ofili	Nigeria	55.51	
6	4	1	Liefde Schoemaker	Belgium	55.75	
7	4	2	Andrea Jiménez	Spain	55.76	
8	4	8	Janka Molnar	Hungary	55.93	
9	4	7	Alina Luchsheva	Belarus	55.97	
10	3	6	Meghan Hunter	United States	56.08	
11	2	8	Ola Buwaro	The Gambia	56.63	
12	3	4	Deshana Skeet	Guyana	56.72	
13	3	3	Lorena Itzel Rangel Batres	Mexico	56.86	
14	2	3	Jasneet Nijjar	Canada	57.75	
15	2	4	Nataliia Dyshliuk	Ukraine	58.06	
16	2	5	Kinga Gacka	Poland	58.27	
17	3	5	Alexandra Zalyubovskaya	Kazakhstan	58.55	
18	3	8	Ana Costa	Portugal	58.72	
19	2	7	Wang You-hsuan	Chinese Taipei	59.21	
20	2	6	Adina Cîrciogel	Romania	1:00.06	
21	2	7	Serenia Ragatu	Fiji	1:01.97	
	1	4	Daniella Deer	Jamaica	DNS	
	1	3	Megan Moss	Bahamas	DNS	
	1	5	Jiijo Hassan Mohamed	Somalia	DNS	
	1	7	Aissata Denn Conte	Guinea	DNS	

=== Final placing ===
Rank	Athlete	Nation	Stage 1	Stage 2	Total
1st place, gold medalist(s)	Barbora Malíková	Czech Republic	54.18	54.68	1:48.86
2nd place, silver medalist(s)	Marie Scheppan	Germany	54.91	55.15	1:50.06
3rd place, bronze medalist(s)	Niddy Mingilishi	Zambia	55.16	55.32	1:50.48
4	Erica Geni Barbosa Cavalheiro	Brazil	55.60	55.43	1:51.03
5	Liefde Schoemaker	Belgium	56.14	55.75	1:51.89
6	Alina Luchsheva	Belarus	55.93	55.97	1:51.90
7	Janka Molnar	Hungary	56.00	55.93	1:51.93
8	Andrea Jiménez	Spain	56.38	55.76	1:52.14
9	Meghan Hunter	United States	56.83	56.08	1:52.91
10	Favour Ofili	Nigeria	57.51	55.51	1:53.02
11	Deshana Skeet	Guyana	56.85	56.72	1:53.57
12	Lorena Itzel Rangel Batres	Mexico	57.08	56.86	1:53.94
13	Ola Buwaro	The Gambia	58.37	56.63	1:55.00
14	Jasneet Nijjar	Canada	57.97	57.75	1:55.72
15	Nataliia Dyshliuk	Ukraine	57.67	58.06	1:55.73
16	Alexandra Zalyubovskaya	Kazakhstan	57.21	58.55	1:55.76
17	Ana Costa	Portugal	57.58	58.72	1:56.30
18	Kinga Gacka	Poland	58.30	58.27	1:56.57
19	Wang You-hsuan	Chinese Taipei	58.45	59.21	1:57.66
20	Adina Cîrciogel	Romania	57.76	1:00.06	1:57.82
21	Serenia Ragatu	Fiji	1:00.95	1:01.97	2:02.92
	Daniella Deer	Jamaica	1:00.12	DNS	
	Megan Moss	Bahamas	1:02.25	DNS	
	Jiijo Hassan Mohamed	Somalia	1:20.76	DNS	
	Aissata Denn Conte	Guinea	DQ	DNS	
