= Alice Dixon =

Alice Dixon may refer to:

- Alice Dixon Le Plongeon (1851–1910), née Dixon, English photographer, amateur archeologist, traveller, and author
- Alice Dixson (born 1969), often misspelled Dixon, Filipino actress, model and beauty queen
- Alice Dixon (sprinter) (born 2003), Australian sprinter
