= Skadi Schier =

German athlete (born 2000)

Personal information
- Nationality: German
- Born: 25 March 2000 (age 26) Lübben (Spreewald) or Lübbenau

Sport
- Sport: Athletics
- Event: 400 metres

Achievements and titles
- Personal bests: 200 m: 23.26 (2026); 400 m: 51.53 (2026); Indoor; 200 m: 23.46 (2026); 400 m: 52.26 (2026)

Skadi Schier (born 25 March 2000) is a German sprinter who has won multiple national championship titles over 400 metres.

== Biography ==
From Lübbenau, Brandenburg, Schier trained in Cottbus, and also ran for SC Potsdam and had success as a junior and under-20 athlete in short sprints at a national level before transitioning to the 400 metres in 2022.

As a member of SCC Berlin, Schier won the senior German Indoor Athletics Championships in Dortmund in February 2023 over 400 metres. Competing outdoors that summer, Schier won the German Athletics Championships over 400 metres in July 2023, running 51.82 seconds. She was part of the German mixed 4 × 400 m relay team at the 2023 World Athletics Championships in Budapest in August 2023.

She competed in the women's 4 × 400 metres relay at the 2024 World Relays, in Nassau, The Bahamas. Schier was part of the German women's 4 × 400 m relay team at the 2024 European Athletics Championships in Rome in June 2024. Later that month, she retained her German 400 metres title. She was selected for the Germany relay pool at the 2024 Olympic Games, where she competed in the women's 4 × 400 metres relay at the women's 4 × 400 m relay.

In Dortmund in February 2025, she placed second to Johanna Martin at the German Indoor Championships over 400 metres. She competed at the 2025 World Athletics Relays in China in the Women's 4 × 400 metres relay in May 2025. In August 2025, Schier won her third consecutive German title over 400 metres. She was selected for the German team for the 2025 World Athletics Championships in Tokyo, Japan, where she ran in the women's x 400 metres relay.

In May 2026, she competed in the German team at the 2026 World Athletics Relays in Gaborone, Botswana, running in the mixed 4 × 400 m relay and women's 4 × 400 m relay. In the women's race she helped the team qualify for the 2027 World Championships, alongside Jana Lakner, Annkathrin Hoven and Irina Gorr. On 19 June, she ran a personal best 51.53 seconds for the 400 metres at the 2026 Doha Diamond League. Shortly after setting her new personal best, she was forced to withdraw from the German Outdoor Championships due to a torn muscle fiber in the left thigh. Consequently, she was not capable of defending her national 400 m title.
