= Jana Lakner =

German athlete (born 2000)

Personal information
- Nationality: German
- Born: 22 July 2000 (age 26)

Sport
- Sport: Athletics
- Event: 400 metres

Achievements and titles
- Personal bests: 400 m: 51.60 (Wattenscheid, 2026); Indoor; 400 m: 53.13 (Dortmund, 2025)

Jana Lakner (born 22 July 2000) is a German sprinter, specialising in the 400 metres. She competed for Germany at the 2025 World Athletics Championships.

== Biography ==
From Landshut, she was later based in Regensburg. A member of LG Telis Finanz Regensburg. Lakner is coached by Stefan Wimmer.

In Dortmund in February 2025, she ran a personal best of 53.13 seconds at the German Indoor Championships over 400 metres. She competed at the 2025 World Athletics Relays in China in the Women's 4 × 400 metres relay in May 2025. She also competed for Germany in the Mixed 4 × 400 metres relay at the event. The following month, Lakner took her lifetime best from 53.13 to 51.77 to win the women’s 400 m in Dresden ahead of Johanna Martin, who was given an identical time, before she then ran a personal best for the 400 m of 51.73 in Geneva later in June 2025. That month, she represented Germany at the 2025 European Athletics Team Championships, competing in the mixed 4 × 400 metres relay. In July, she placed fifth in the 400 m at the 2025 Summer World University Games in Bochum. In August, in Dresden she had a third-place finish at the German Championships in 52.30 seconds. She was selected for the German team for the 2025 World Athletics Championships in Tokyo, Japan, where she ran in the women's x 400 metres relay.

In May 2026, she competed for the German team at the 2026 World Athletics Relays in Gaborone, Botswana, running in the mixed 4 × 400 m relay and women's 4 × 400 m relay. In the women's race she ran a split time of 50.85 seconds, the fastest by a German woman for two years, to help the team qualify for the 2027 World Championships, alongside Skadi Schier, Annkathrin Hoven and Irina Gorr. At the 2026 German Outdoor Championships she got second behind Johanna Martin in a new personal record of 51.60s. In August, she competed at the 2026 European Athletics Championships in Birmingham, England, in the women's 4 x 400 metres relay.

== Personal life ==
Lakner studies in industrial sensor technology at OTH Regensburg. She also spent time in the United States at the University of Nevada in Las Vegas.
