= Leah Anderson =

Jamaican sprinter (born 1999)

Personal information
- Nationality: Jamaican
- Born: 1 December 1999 (age 26)
- Home town: Mount Vernon, NY

Sport
- Sport: Athletics
- Event: 400 metres
- College team: St. John's Red Storm

Achievements and titles
- Personal bests: 400m: 50.78 (Kingston, 2025)
Medal record
Women's athletics
Representing Jamaica
Commonwealth Games
Gold medal – first place	2026 Glasgow	4×400m Mixed
NACAC Championships
Gold medal – first place	2025 Freeport	4x400m Mixed

Leah Anderson (born 1 December 1999) is a Jamaican sprinter.

== Early life ==
For high school, she attended Cardinal Spellman in New York. She studied Illustration at St. John's University (New York City).

== Career ==
2023

In February 2023, she set a new Jamaican national, Commonwealth, and Central American and Caribbean 500m indoor record at the New Balance Indoor Grand Prix in Boston, Massachusetts, running a time of 1:08.34.

2024

In 2024 she ran for Jamaica in the 4 × 400 m relay at the 2024 World Athletics Indoor Championships in Glasgow, Scotland. She also ran at the 2024 World Relays in Nassau, The Bahamas.

2025

She was named in the Jamaican team for the 2025 World Athletics Indoor Championships in Nanjing in March 2025. She reached the final of the 400 metres at the Jamaican Athletics Championships in June 2025. She ran 50.90 seconds to finish second behind Britton Wilson at the Ed Murphey Track Classic, a World Athletics Continental Tour Silver meet, on 12 July in Memphis, Tennessee. She was a gold medalist at the 2025 NACAC Championships in Freeport, The Bahamas in the mixed 4x400 metres relay.

She was selected for the Jamaican team for the 2025 World Athletics Championships in Tokyo, Japan, where she ran on the opening day in the mixed 4 × 400 metres relay.

2026

Anderson was selected to represent Jamaica at the 2026 World Athletics Indoor Championships in Toruń, Poland, running the last leg of the mixed 4 x 400 metres relay as part of the Jamaican team third across the line, but were later disqualified for exchanging positions before a takeover. In May, she ran at the 2026 World Athletics Relays in the women's 4 × 400 metres relay in Gaborone, Botswana. In July, she was a semi-finalist in the 400 metres at the 2026 Commonwealth Games in Glasgow, Scotland. Later at the Games, she won a gold medal in the mixed 4 × 400 m relay.
