= Fiji at the 2018 Summer Youth Olympics =

- IOC code: FIJ
- NOC: Fiji Association of Sports and National Olympic Committee
- Website: http://www.fijiolympiccommittee.com/

in Buenos Aires, Argentina 6 – 18 October 2018
- Competitors: 3 in 3 sports
- Medals: Gold 0 Silver 0 Bronze 0 Total 0

Summer Youth Olympics appearances
- 2010; 2014; 2018; 2026

Fiji participated at the 2018 Summer Youth Olympics in Buenos Aires, Argentina from 6 October to 18 October 2018.

== Athletics ==
Fiji was given a quota by the tripartite committee to compete in a boys' event.

- Girls' events – 1 quota

Track & road events

Athlete	Event	Stage 1		Stage 2	
Athlete	Event	Result	Rank	Result	Rank
Serenia Ragatu	Girls' 400 m	1:00.95	22	1:01.97	21

== Badminton ==
Fiji was given a quota to compete by the tripartite committee.

Singles

Athlete	Event	Group stage				Quarterfinal	Semifinal	Final / BM	Rank
Athlete	Event	Opposition Score	Opposition Score	Opposition Score	Rank	Opposition Score	Opposition Score	Opposition Score	Rank
Chang Ho Kim	Boys' Singles	Naraoka (JPN); L (7–21, 5–21)	Panarin (KAZ); L (5–21, 3–21)	Savin (MDA); L (7–21, 4–21)	4	did not advance			9

Team

Athlete	Event	Group stage				Quarterfinal	Semifinal	Final / BM	Rank
Athlete	Event	Opposition Score	Opposition Score	Opposition Score	Rank	Opposition Score	Opposition Score	Opposition Score	Rank
Team Omega; Chang Ho Kim (FIJ); Markus Barth (NOR); Oscar Guo (NZL); Kunlavut Vitidsarn (THA); Huang Yin-hsuan (TPE); Léonice Huet (FRA); Anastasiya Prozorova (UKR); Vũ Thị Anh Thư (VIE)	Mixed Teams	Gamma (MIX); W (110–99)	Theta (MIX); W (110–100)	Sigma (MIX); W (110–98)	1Q	Epsilon (MIX); W (110–102)	Zeta (MIX); W (110–109)	Alpha (MIX); L (106–110)	2nd place, silver medalist(s)

== Table tennis ==
Fiji was given a quota by the tripartite committee to compete in table tennis.

Athlete	Event	Group stage				Round of 16	Quarterfinals	Semifinals	Final / BM	
Athlete	Event	Opposition Score	Opposition Score	Opposition Score	Rank	Opposition Score	Opposition Score	Opposition Score	Opposition Score	Rank
Grace Rosi Yee	Girls' singles	Bruna Takahashi (BRA); L 0–4	Anna Węgrzyn (POL); L 0–4	Hui Ling Vong (NZL); L 1–4	4	did not advance				25
Oceania–1; Grace Rosi Yee (FIJ); Benjamin Gould (AUS)	Mixed team	Romania; L 0–3	United States; L 0–3	New Zealand; L 0–3	4	did not advance				25
