= Alanah Yukich =

Australian athlete (born 1998)

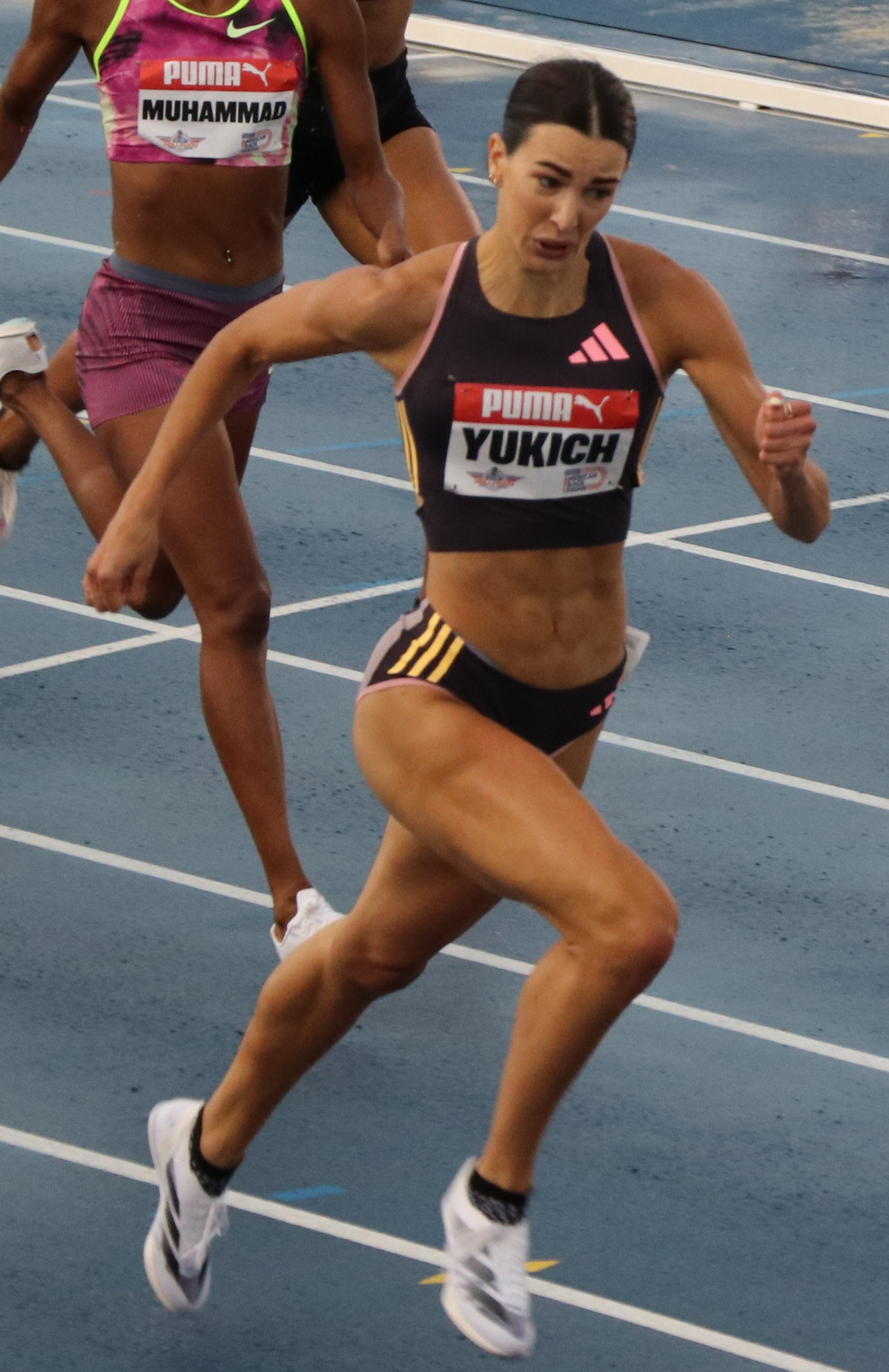

Personal information
- Nationality: Australian
- Born: 27 January 1998 (age 28)
- Height: 180 cm (5 ft 11 in)

Sport
- Sport: Athletics
- Events: Sprint, Hurdles

Achievements and titles
- Personal bests: 400m: 52.53 (Waco, 2024); 400m hurdles: 55.04 (Memphis, 2025)
Medal record
Women's athletics
Representing Australia
World Relays
Silver medal – second place	2025 Guangzhou	Mixed 4×400 m relay
Oceania Championships
Silver medal – second place	2026 Darwin	400m hurdles

Alanah Yukich (born 27 January 1998) is an Australian athlete who competes in the 400 metres hurdles.

== Early life ==
She grew up on a farm in Gingin, Western Australia, a small town 78.3 kilometres north of Perth. She moved to United States to be a student-athlete at the University of Texas at San Antonio (UTSA) and graduated in 2023. She continued to live and train in Texas where she is coached by Rose Monday. She has Croatian heritage.

== Career ==
She competed at the 2016 IAAF World U20 Championships in the 400m hurdles and 4 × 400 m relay.

She won the 400m hurdles at the 2022 Conference USA outdoor track meet.

In April 2024, she was selected as part of the Australian team for the 2024 World Athletics Relays in Nassau, Bahamas.

In June 2024, she ran a personal best for the 400 metres hurdles of 55.15 seconds as she tried to achieve Olympic qualification, competing in five different countries in sixteen days. She competed in the 400 metres hurdles at the 2024 Summer Olympics in Paris in August 2024, where she reached the semi finals.

She was runner-up in the 400 metres hurdles at the Australian Athletics Championships in Perth on 13 April 2025 in a time of 55.29 seconds. She was a member of the Australian team in the Mixed 4 × 400 m relay at the 2025 World Athletics Relays which set a new Oceania record of 3:12.34, taking nearly five seconds off the previous best mark set in 2021, and became the first Mixed team in Australian history to qualify for a major championships, qualifying on the first day of the competition for the 2025 World Championships. Australia went on to win the silver medal in the final of the event. On the second day of the competition she ran in the Women's 4 × 400 metres relay, also helping that team to qualify for the World Championships.

She ran a personal best 55.04 seconds for the 400 metres hurdles to finish second behind Tia-Adana Belle at the Ed Murphey Track Classic, a World Athletics Continental Tour Silver meet, on 12 July in Memphis, Tennessee. She competed at the 2025 World Athletics Championships in Tokyo, Japan, running 56.68 seconds without qualifying for the semi-finals.

In April 2026, she ran 55.71 seconds to place second in the 400 m hurdles at the Australian Championships in Sydney. The following month she was selected for the Australian team to compete at the 2026 World Athletics Relays in Gaborone, Botswana. She ran in the women’s 4 x 400 metres relay alongside Alice Dixon, Alexia Loizou and Sarah Carli. On the second day, she helped the team qualify for the 2027 World Championships. Later that month, she was the silver medalist in the 400 metres hurdles at the 2026 Oceania Athletics Championships.

== Personal life ==
She has also worked as a model. She is of Croatian descent.
