= Helena Ponette =

Belgian sprinter (born 2000)

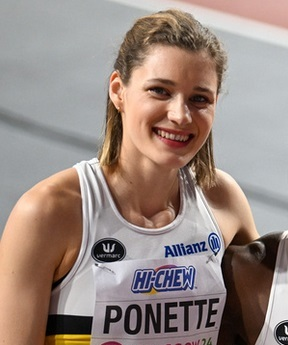
- Ponette in 2024

Personal information
- Nationality: Belgian
- Born: 3 February 2000 (age 26)

Sport
- Country: Belgium
- Sport: Athletics
- Event: 400 metres
- Club: Hermes Club Oostende
Medal record
Women's athletics
Representing Belgium
World Championships
Bronze medal – third place	2025 Tokyo	4 × 400 m mixed
European Championships
Bronze medal – third place	2024 Rome	4 × 400 m relay
World Indoor Championships
Gold medal – first place	2026 Toruń	4 × 400 m mixed
European Indoor Championships
Silver medal – second place	2025 Apeldoorn	4 × 400 m mixed

Helena Ponette (born 3 February 2000) is a Belgian sprinter specialising in the 400 metres. She competed at the 2024 Summer Olympics as a 400 metres runner and as a member of the Belgian women's 4 × 400 metres and mixed 4 × 400 metres relay teams. She also participated at multiple World and European Athletics championships, indoor and outdoor, individually and as a member of the 4 × 400 metres relay teams. She was national champion in the women's 400 metres in 2023. Also at the time of 2024 Olympic Games, she was finishing her studies in medicine at KU Leuven, and starting internship in September 2024.

== Career ==
Ponette competed in the 4 × 400 m event at the 2021 European U23 Championships in Tallinn, Estonia. At the same event, she was selected for the 2022 World Athletics Indoor Championships in Belgrade, Serbia, but did not start.

In 2022, Ponette finished second at the 2022 Belgian Athletics Championships behind Naomi Van den Broeck in the 400 m with a time of 51.93 s. She was the fifth Belgian to run faster than 52 s. She thus secured a place in the Belgian 4 × 400 m relay team for the World Championships later that year in Eugene, Oregon, U.S.A. Her international debut with the seniors Belgium 4 × 400 m relay team came at the 2022 World Athletics Championships in Eugene, Oregon where the team finished 6th. Little more than a month later, she and the team finished 4th at the 2022 European Athletics Championships in Munich, Germany .

In 2023, she was a member of the Belgian 4 × 400 m relay team at the World Championships in Budapest, Hungary that finished 5th in the final. She also ran the 400 metres where she was eliminated in the heats but did run a personal best.

In 2024, at the World Athletics Relays in The Bahamas, she was on the team that qualified Belgium for the women's 4 × 400 metres relay at the 2024 Summer Olympic Games in Paris, France. And later that same year, she was on the Belgian 4 × 400 metres women's relay team that won a bronze medal at the European Athletics Championships having anchored the team in the final.

At the 2024 Summer Olympic Games, she ran in the heats and final of both the mixed 4 × 400 metres relay and the women's 4 × 400 metres relay with the Belgium teams finishing 4th resp. 7th in the finals. Having also qualified individually for the women's 400 metres via the World Athletics Rankings, she finished 6th in her round 1 heat and was eliminated in the repechages but did set a new personal best of 51.46 seconds.

In March 2025, she ran the anchor leg of Belgium's 4 × 400 m mixed relay team that won a silver medal at the 2025 European Athletics Indoor Championships in Apeldoorn, The Netherlands. In May 2025, at the World Athletics Relays in Guangzhou, China, she ran as a member of both the Belgium women's 4 × 400 metres relay and the mixed 4 × 400 metres relay teams qualifying both teams for the 2025 World Athletics Championships. At those 2025 World Athletics Championships in Tokyo, Japan, she won a bronze medal with the Belgian team in the mixed 4 × 400 metres relay and finished fourth in the final of the 2025 World Athletics Championships – Women's 4 × 400 metres relay.

In March 2026, she was selected for the relays at the 2026 World Athletics Indoor Championships in Poland, winning the gold medal in the first ever indoor mixed 4 × 400 metres relay on 21 March running alongside Ilana Hanssens, Julien Watrin and Jonathan Sacoor. Their time of 3:15.60 was the fastest short track performance recorded for the event. At the Belgian Athletics Championships in July she ran a new personal best of 50.80s in the 400 metres and in doing so qualified for the 2026 European Athletics Championships in Birmingham, United Kingdom in August. At those Championships, she clocked another lifetime best of 50.31s in the semifinals to qualify on time for the women's 400 metres final where she finished seventh. She also participated in the women's 4 × 400 metres relay helping the Belgian team to reach the final where it finished sixth.

== Personal life ==
Ponette studies at the Faculty of Medicine of the KU Leuven in Belgium to become a Master of Medicine. She hails from a family of physicians: her parents are physicians, so are her grandfathers. An older sister is a pharmacist and a younger brother is also studying to become a medical doctor.

== International competitions ==
Year	Competition	Venue	Position	Event	Notes
Representing Belgium
2022	European Championships	Munich, Germany	4th	4 × 400 m relay	3:22.12
2022	World Championships	Eugene, United States	6th	4 × 400 m relay	3:26.29
2022	World Championships	Eugene, United States	10th	4 × 400 m relay mixed	3:16.01
2023	European Indoor Championships	Istanbul, Turkey	7th (sf)	400 m	53.07
2023	World Championships	Budapest, Hungary	27 (h)	400 m	51.52 PB
2023	World Championships	Budapest, Hungary	5th	4 × 400 m relay	3:22.84
2024	World Indoor Championships	Glasgow, United Kingdom	4th	4 × 400 m relay	3:28.05
2024	World Relays	Nassau, Bahamas	1st (r)	4 × 400 m relay	3:26.79
2024	European Championships	Rome, Italy	11th (sf)	400 m	51.65
2024	European Championships	Rome, Italy	3rd	4 × 400 m relay	3:22.95
2024	European Championships	Rome, Italy	4th	4 × 400 m relay mixed	3:11.03
2024	Olympic Games	Paris, France	14th (r)	400 m	51.46
2024	Olympic Games	Paris, France	7th	4 × 400 m relay	3:22.40
2024	Olympic Games	Paris, France	4th	4 × 400 m relay mixed	3:09.36
2025	European Indoor Championships	Apeldoorn, Netherlands	2nd	4 × 400 m relay mixed	3:16.19
2025	European Indoor Championships	Apeldoorn, Netherlands	13th (h)	400 m	52.32
2025	World Relays	Guangzhou, China	1st (r1)	4 × 400 m relay mixed	3:11.83
2025	World Relays	Guangzhou, China	2nd (r2)	4 × 400 m relay	3:24.52
2025	World Championships	Tokyo, Japan	4th	4 × 400 m relay	3:22.15
2025	World Championships	Tokyo, Japan	3rd	4 × 400 m relay mixed	3:10.61
2026	World Indoor Championships	Toruń, Poland	23rd (h)	400 m	52.34
2026	World Indoor Championships	Toruń, Poland	1st	4 × 400 m relay mixed	3:15.60
2026	European Championships	Birmingham, United Kingdom	7th	400 m	51.43
2026	European Championships	Birmingham, United Kingdom	6th	4 × 400 m relay	3:25.19

== Personal bests ==
Outdoor

- 200 metres – 23.65 (Oordegem 2022)
- 400 metres – 50.80 (Leuven 2026)

Indoor

- 200 metres – 25.41 (Gent 2020)
- 400 metres – 52.31 (Istanbul 2023)
