= Irina Gorr =

German athlete (born 1997)

Personal information
- Nationality: German
- Born: 19 December 1997 (age 28)

Sport
- Sport: Athletics
- Event: 400 metres

Irina Gorr (born 19 December 1997) is a German sprinter who specialises in the 400 metres.

== Biography ==
From Mindelheim, she is a member of LG Stadtwerke München and TSV Gräfelfing in Bavaria.

In June 2025, she represented Germany at the 2025 European Athletics Team Championships, competing in the mixed 4 × 400 metres relay. However, she suffered an injury in the final of the 400 metres at the German Championships which ended her season.

In May 2026, she competed for the German team at the 2026 World Athletics Relays in Gaborone, Botswana, running in the women's 4 × 400 m relay, helping the team qualify for the 2027 World Championships, alongside Skadi Schier, Annkathrin Hoven and Jana Lakner. In August, she was a finalist in the 4 x 400 metres relay at the 2026 European Athletics Championships in Birmingham.
