= Ana Prieto =

Spanish athlete (born 2005)

Ana Prieto Benítez
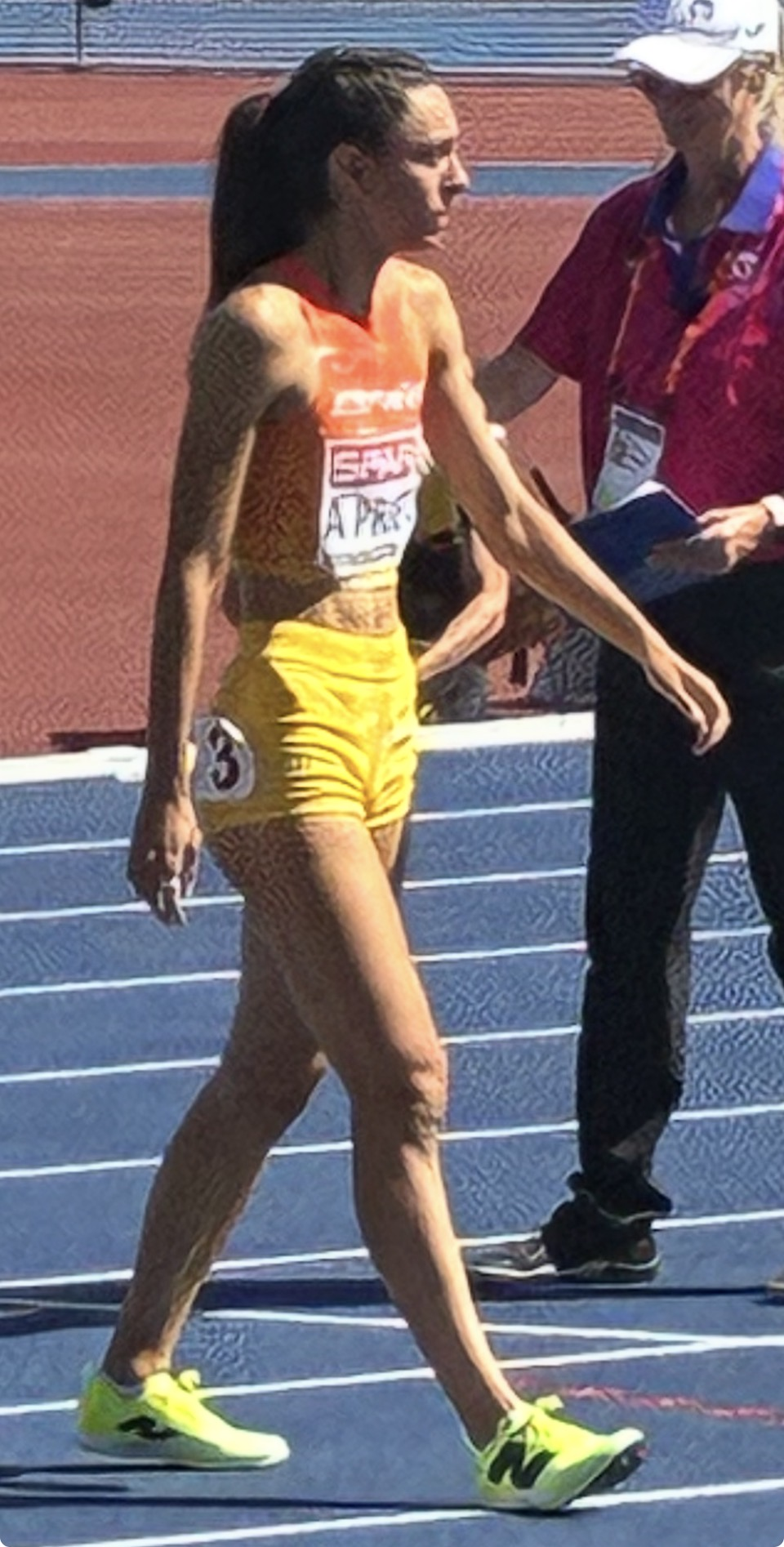
- Prieto in 2026

Personal information
- Nationality: Spain
- Born: 17 October 2005 (age 20)

Sport
- Sport: Athletics
- Event: Sprint

Achievements and titles
- Personal bests: 400m: 51.75 (Bergen, 2025)
Medal record
Women's athletics
Representing Spain
World Indoor Championships
Bronze medal – third place	2026 Toruń	4 × 400 m relay
World Relays
Silver medal – second place	2026 Gaborone	4 × 400 m relay
European U23 Championships
Silver medal – second place	2025 Bergen	4x400 m relay

Ana Prieto Benítez (born 17 October 2005) is a Spanish sprinter who primarily competes over 400 metres.

== Career ==
She is from Algeciras and Los Barrios in Andalusia and trains under athletics coach Saúl Sáez as a member of Algeciras Bay Athletics Club.

She competed for Spain at the 2023 European Athletics U20 Championships in Jerusalem, Israel, reaching the final of the 400 metres, placing seventh overall.

Competing at the 2025 European Athletics U23 Championships in Bergen, Norway, in July 2025 she won a silver medal as a member of the Spanish women's 4 x 400 metres relay team which finished behind Great Britain. She had previously placed fourth in the 400 metres at the Championships, running a personal best 51.75 seconds in the final.

She was selected as part of the Spanish team at the 2025 World Athletics Championships in Tokyo, Japan, in September 2025, and she ran in the women's 4 x 400 metres race.

In March 2026, she was selected for the Spanish relay team for the 2026 World Athletics Indoor Championships in Poland, winning the bronze medal with the women's 4 x 400 m relay team. Competing at the 2026 World Athletics Relays, she ran as part of the women’s 4 x 400 m team which won their heat in 3:24.44, just 31 hundredths of a second shy of the Spanish record, and qualifying for the final. The following day, she ran as the Spanish quartet achieved a 3:21.25 national record to win the silver medal in the women’s 4 x 400m final. Competing at the 2026 European Athletics Championships in Birmingham, England, in August, she was a semi-finalist in the 400 metres. She also competed in the women's 4 × 400 metres relay at the championships, as the Spanish team placed fourth in the final.
