= Lakeri Ertzgaard =

Norwegian athlete (born 2002)

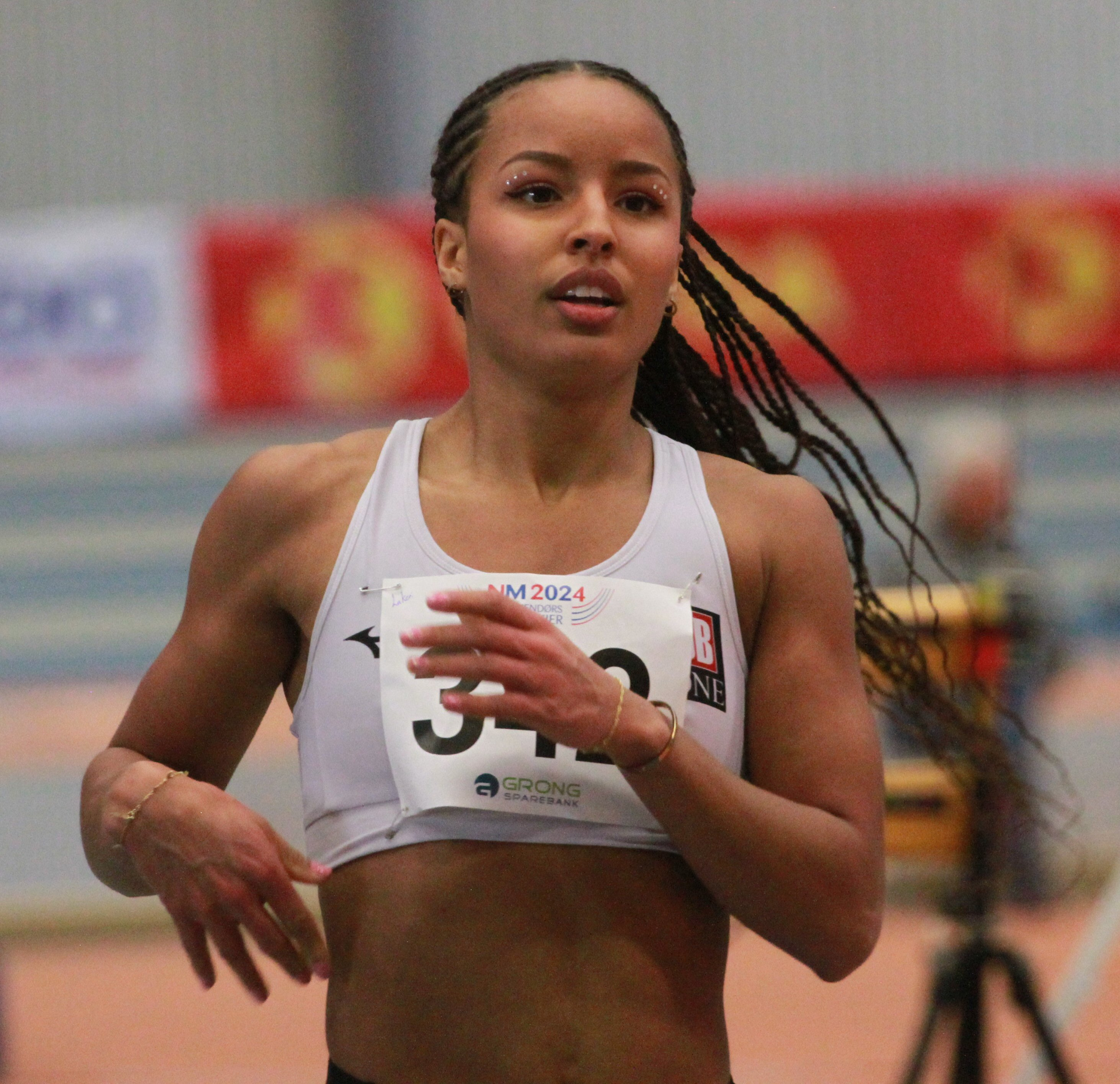

Personal information
- Full name: Astri Ayo Lakeri Ertzgaard
- Born: 28 March 2002 (age 24)

Sport
- Sport: Athletics
- Event: 400 metres

Achievements and titles
- Personal best: 400m: 51.92 (2025)
Medal record
Women's athletics
Representing Norway
World Relays
Gold medal – first place	2026 Gaborone	4 × 400 m relay

Lakeri Ertzgaard (born 28 March 2002) is a Norwegian sprinter. She has won Norwegian national titles over 400 metres both indoors and outdoors, and competed at the 2022 and 2025 World Athletics Championships.

== Biography ==
She is the daughter of athlete John Ertzgaard and actress Asta Busingye Lydersen. Her sister Kaitesi Ertzgaard is also an athlete. She competed for Norway in the 4 x 400 metres relay at the 2022 World Athletics Championships in Eugene, Oregon.

Competing for Norway at the 2023 European Athletics U23 Championships in Espoo, Finland in July 2023, she qualified for the final of the 400 metres, placing seventh overall.

She won the Norwegian Indoor Athletics Championships title over 400 metres in February 2024. She was a member of the Norwegian team at the 2024 World Athletics Relays in Nassau, The Bahamas with Amalie Iuel, Henriette Jaeger and Josefine Tomine Eriksen.

She competed for Norway at the 2024 European Athletics Championships in Rome in June 2024; reaching the semi-finals of the individual 400 metres and also running as a member of the 4 x 400 metres relay team.

She competed over 400 metres at the 2025 European Athletics Indoor Championships in Apeldoorn, the Netherlands. She won the Norwegian Athletics Championships title over 400 metres in August 2025.

She was a member of the Norwegian 4 x 400 metres team which qualified for the final at the 2025 World Athletics Championships in Tokyo, Japan, placing sixth overall.

Competing at the 2026 World Athletics Relays in Gaborone, Botswana, she helped the Norwegian women's 4 x 400 metres team run a national record of 3:22.78 in the qualifying round on 2 May. The following day, she ran as they improved the national record to 3:20.96 to win the gold medal in the women’s 4 x 400m final. She competed at the 2026 European Athletics Championships in Birmingham, England, in August, in the 400 metres. She also competed in the women's 4 × 400 metres relay at the championships.
