= Alice Dixon (sprinter) =

Australian sprinter (born 2003)

Personal information
- Nationality: Australian
- Born: 23 October 2003 (age 22)

Sport
- Sport: Athletics
- Event: Sprint

Achievements and titles
- Personal best(s): 100m: 12.11 (2025); 200m: 23.70 (2026); 400m: 52.62 (2026); 400mH: 59.62 (2026)
Medal record
Women's athletics
Representing Australia
Oceania Championships
Bronze medal – third place	2026 Darwin	400 m

Alice Dixon (born 23 October 2003) is an Australian sprinter.

== Biography ==
From New South Wales, as a junior Dixon ran 24.99 seconds for the 200 metres as a 13-year-old in 2016 before later battling with injuries. Coached by Melinda Gainsford-Taylor, Dixon represented Australia at the 2023 Oceania Cup in Saipan and won silver medals in both the 200 metres, running 24.87 seconds, and the 400 metres, running 55.96 seconds.

A member of UTS Norths Athletics Club, in February 2026, she ran a personal best 52.64 seconds for the 400 metres in Wollongong. On 11 April 2026, she was a finalist over 400 metres at the 2026 Australian Athletics Championships, placing fourth overall in 52.98 seconds.

Dixon was selected for the Australian team to compete at the 2026 World Athletics Relays in Gaborone, Botswana. She ran in the women’s 4 x 400 metres relay alongside Alanah Yukich, Alexia Loizou and Sarah Carli on the opening day before the following day with Ellie Beer added to the team, Dixon ran as the team secured qualification for the 2027 World Championships with a season’s best time of 3:26.92. Dixon was selected for the 400 metres as part of the Australian team to compete at the 2026 Oceania Athletics Championships in Darwin, Northern Territory, where she won the bronze medal in the 400 metres in a personal best 52.62 behind Beer and Mia Gross in an Australian sweep of the medals.

== Personal life ==
Dixon is a recipient of the Neville Sillitoe Foundation Scholarship.
