= Josefine Tomine Eriksen =

Norwegian athlete (born 2000)

Josefine Tomine Eriksen Aks
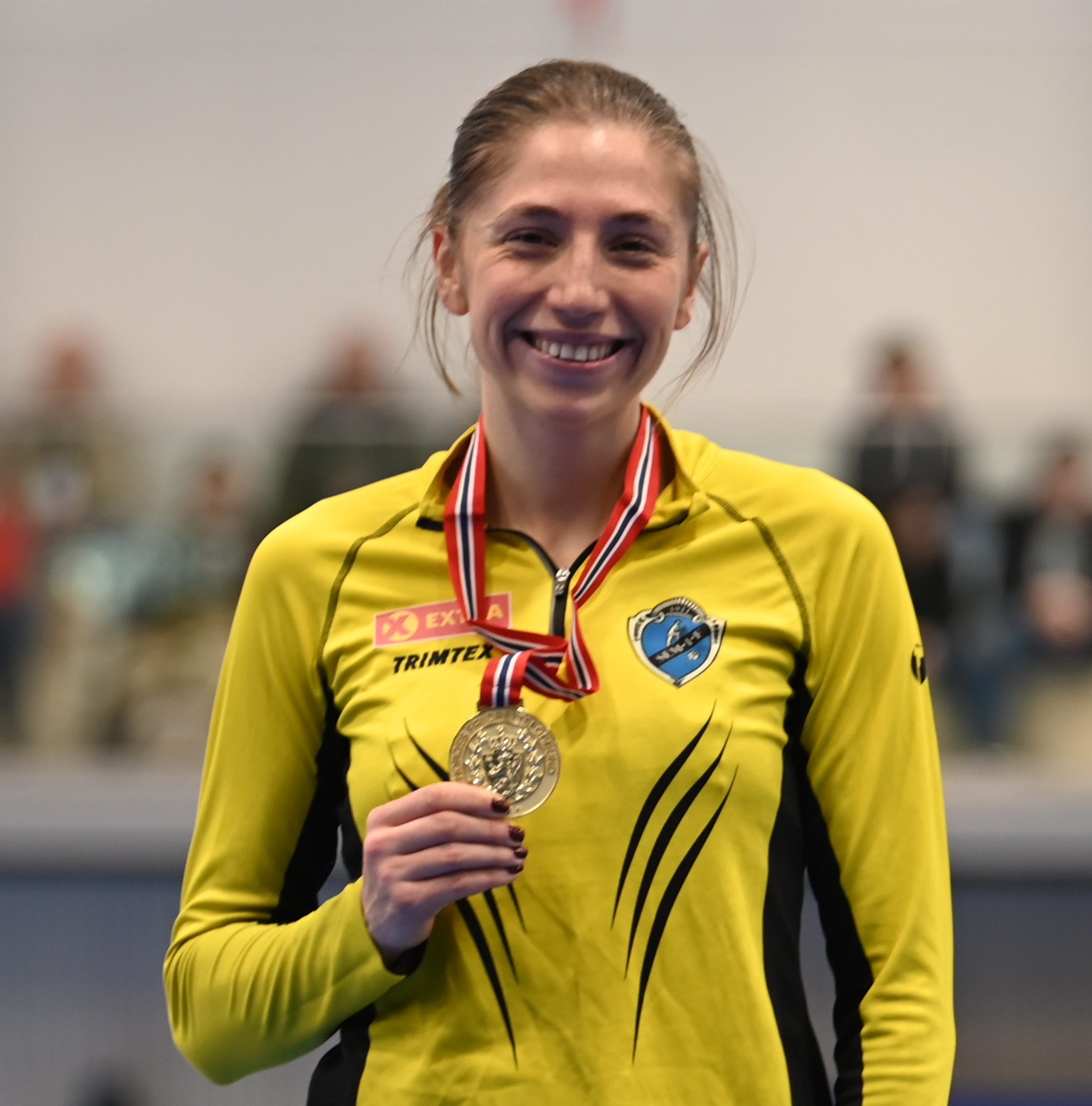
- Aks in 2026

Personal information
- Born: 16 August 2000 (age 26)

Sport
- Sport: Athletics
- Event: 400 metres

Achievements and titles
- Personal best: 400m: 52.28 (2025)
Medal record
Women's athletics
Representing Norway
World Relays
Gold medal – first place	2026 Gaborone	4 × 400 m relay
European Youth Championships
Bronze medal – third place	2016 Tbilisi	400 m

Josefine Tomine Eriksen Aks (born 16 August 2000) is a Norwegian sprinter. She competed at the 2024 Olympic Games.

== Biography ==
She is from Stavern and won a bronze medal in the 400 metres at the 2016 European Athletics Youth Championships in Tbilisi at the age of 15 years-old and at that age made her debut at the Bislett Games. She later studied and competed in the United States at the University of Texas Rio Grande Valley and from 2022, the University of Utah.

A member of the Norwegian team at the 2024 World Athletics Relays in Nassau, The Bahamas, she also competed in the relay for Norway at the 2024 European Athletics Championships in Rome in June 2024. That month, she was runner-up to Henriette Jaeger over 400 metres at the Norwegian Championships in Sandnes. She competed as part of the Norwegian team at the Athletics at the 2024 Summer Olympics in Paris, France in August, in the women's 4 × 400 metres relay.

She helped the Norwegian women's 4 x 400 metres relay team set a new national record in finishing fourth overall at the 2025 World Athletics Relays in China. She was a member of the Norwegian 4 x 400 metres team which qualified for the final at the 2025 World Athletics Championships in Tokyo, Japan, placing sixth overall.

Aks won the 400 metres title at the 2026 Norwegian Indoor Championships with a time of 52.91 seconds. Competing at the 2026 World Athletics Relays in Gaborone, Botswana, she helped the Norwegian women's 4 x 400 metres team run a national record of 3:22.78 in the qualifying round on 2 May. The following day, she ran as they improved the national record to 3:20.96 to win the gold medal in the women’s 4 x 400m final. Competing at the 2026 European Athletics Championships in Birmingham, England, in August, she was a semi-finalist in the 400 metres. She also competed in the women's 4 × 400 metres relay at the championships.
