= Anna Gryc =

Polish athlete (born 1999)

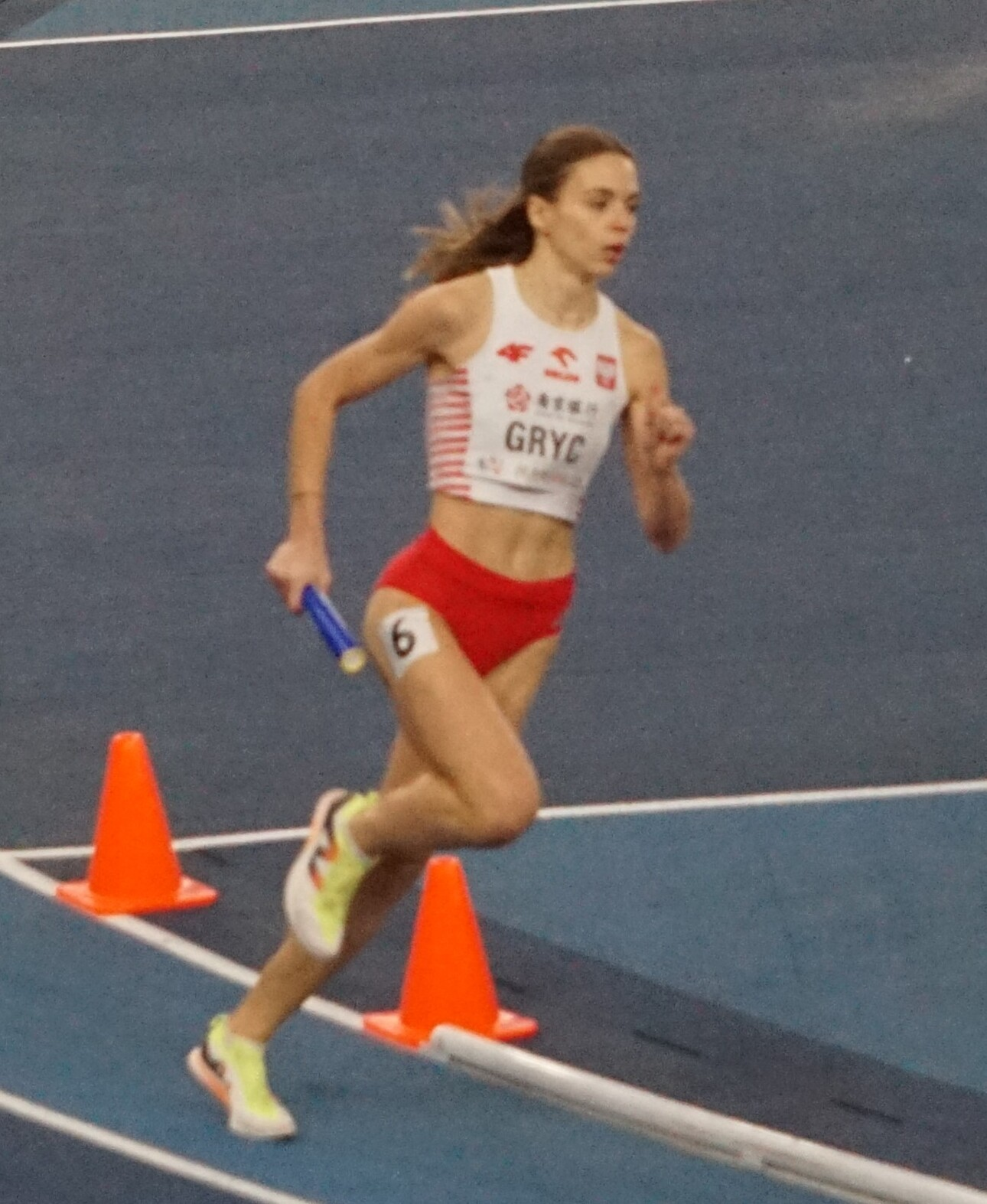
- Anna Maria Gryc in 2025

Personal information
- Full name: Anna Maria Gryc
- Nationality: Polish
- Born: 16 October 1999 (age 26)

Sport
- Sport: Athletics
- Events: Sprint, Hurdles
- Club: Podlasie Białystok

Achievements and titles
- Personal bests: 400m 51.30 (2025); 400m hurdles : 56.71 (2024)
Medal record
Women's athletics
Representing Poland
World Indoor Championships
Silver medal – second place	2025 Nanjing	4×400 m relay
Bronze medal – third place	2026 Toruń	Mixed 4x400 m
European U23 Championships
Bronze medal – third place	2021 Tallinn	4×400 m relay

Anna Maria Gryc (born 16 October 1999) is a Polish sprinter and hurdler specialising in the 400 metres hurdles and 400 metres. She has represented Poland at multiple major championships, and is a two-time medalist in 4 × 400 metres relay races at the World Athletics Indoor Championships.

== Biography ==
She finished fourth in the 400 metres hurdles at the Polish Athletics Championships in June 2021. She won a bronze medal as part of the Polish team that ran in the 4 × 400 metres relays at the 2021 European Athletics U23 Championships, with Gryc running in the semi-finals in Tallinn in July 2021.

She competed in the 4 × 400 metres relay at the 2024 World Athletics Indoor Championships in Glasgow. She equalled her 400 metres hurdles personal best of 56.92 seconds whilst racing at the 2024 European Championships in Rome in June 2024.

She was selected for the 4 × 400m relay team for the 2025 World Athletics Indoor Championships in Nanjing in March 2025.

She was selected for the Polish team for the 2025 World Athletics Championships in Tokyo, Japan, running 55.73 seconds without qualifying for the semi-finals. She also ran in the women's 4 x 400 metres team which qualified for the final.

On 19 February 2026, she was pacemaker for Keely Hodgkinson's indoor 800 metres world record run, in Lievin, France. She placed third over 400 metres at the 2026 Polish Indoor Championships, running 51.96 seconds. She was selected for the relay pool at the 2026 World Athletics Indoor Championships in March 2026 in Poland and was a bronze medalist in the mixed 4 x 400 metres relay. She was also part of the women's 4 x 400 metres relay team which placed fourth overall. In May, she ran at the 2026 World Athletics Relays in the women's 4 × 400 metres relay in Gaborone, Botswana. In August, she competed at the 2026 European Athletics Championships in Birmingham, England, in the women's 4 x 400 metres relay.
