= Arlene Crossan =

Irish athlete (born 1999)

Personal information
- Nationality: Irish
- Born: 13 March 1999 (age 27)

Sport
- Sport: Athletics
- Events: Sprint, Hurdles

Achievements and titles
- Personal bests: 200m: 24.28 (2026); 400m: 53.63 (2025); 400mH: 59.14 (2025)

Arlene Crossan (born 13 March 1999) is an Irish sprinter and hurdler. She has represented Ireland at multiple championships in the 4 x 400 metres relay.

== Biography ==
From Letterkenny in County Donegal, and a member of Finn Valley Athletics Club, Crossan was educated at Loreto Secondary School. Having competed at the 2015 European Youth Olympic Festival, and the 2016 European Youth championships, in 2017 Crossan won the Irish junior title in the 400 metres hurdles, and competed for Ireland at the European U20 Championships in Italy. The following year, Crossan began a scholarship at West Texas A&M University in the United States.

Crossan was part of the Irish 4 x 400 metres relay team at the 2025 European Athletics Indoor Championships in Apeldoorn, Netherlands. That June, Crossan competed in the 400 m hurdles at the 2025 European Athletics Team Championships Second Division in Maribor, Slovenia, running a personal best 59.14 seconds.

Crossan placed second overall to Sharlene Mawdsley in the 400 metres at the 2026 Irish Indoor Championships. Crossan was part of the Ireland team at the 2026 World Athletics Relays in Botswana. On 3 May, she ran as the women's 4 × 400 m team qualified for the 2027 World Championships, running a strong third leg with her split timed at 51.30 seconds, before handing the baton to the anchor Sharlene Mawdsley. In August, she competed for Ireland at the 2026 European Athletics Championships in Birmingham, England, in the women's 4 x 400 metres relay.
