= Lauren Gale (sprinter) =

Canadian track and field athlete

Personal information
- Born: January 1, 2000 (age 26) Fredericton, New Brunswick, Canada
- Height: 171 cm (5 ft 7 in)
- Weight: 58 kg (128 lb)

Achievements and titles
- Personal bests: 200 m: 22.80 (2024); 400 m: 50.47 (2024)
Medal record
Women's track and field
Representing Canada
World Relays
Bronze medal – third place	2026 Gaborone	4×400 m relay
Pan American U20 Athletics Championships
Silver medal – second place	2019 San José	4x400 relay

Lauren Gale (born January 1, 2000) is a Canadian track and field athlete specializing in the sprint events.

== Career ==
Gale was an All-American sprinter for the Colorado State Rams track and field team, finishing 8th in the 400 meters at the 2022 NCAA Division I Indoor Track and Field Championships.

At the 2019 Pan American U20 Athletics Championships, Gale was part of the silver medal-winning 4x400 relay team. In July 2021, Gale was part of Canada's 2020 Olympic team in the women's 4x400 relay but was not a competitor.
