= Jasneet Nijjar =

Canadian athlete

Personal information
- Nationality: Canadian
- Born: 12 June 2001 (age 25) Surrey, British Columbia

Sport
- Sport: Athletics
- Event: Sprint

Achievements and titles
- Personal best(s): 60m: 7.61s (2023); 100m: 12.05s (2019); 200m: 23.48s (2025); 400m: 51.84s (2024)
Medal record
Women's athletics
Representing Canada
World Relays
Bronze medal – third place	2026 Gaborone	4×400 m relay

Jasneet Nijjar (born 12 June 2001) is a Canadian sprinter who primarily competes over 400 metres. She ran for Canada at the 2025 World Athletics Championships.

== Biography ==
Nijjar began in athletics at the age of seven years-old and started training at the Universal Athletics Club in North Surrey, British Columbia under coach Jessie Dosanjh, excelling in sprinting from a young age. She competed for Canada in Buenos Aires at the 2018 Summer Youth Olympics at the age of 17 years old. In 2018, she won over 200 metres at the Canada Junior Track & Field Championships in Ottawa. That year, she won three titles at the BC High School Track & Field Championships. Having studied at Queen Elizabeth Secondary School in British Columbia, she began studying at Washington State University in the United States in 2019.

Nijjar placed fourth in the 400 metres at the 2024 Canadian Athletics Championships, and was part of the Canadian squad for the relays at the 2024 Olympic Games in Paris, but did not race. She was selected the following year for the Canadian relay pool for the 2025 World Athletics Relays in China in May 2025, and ran in the women's 4 x 400 metres relay, helping the Canadian team qualify for the upcoming world championships. She was subsequently named in the Canadian team for the 2025 World Athletics Championships in Tokyo, Japan. Nijjar was a member of the Canadian relay team which ran on the opening day in the mixed 4 × 400 metres relay.

She was selected as part of the Canadian team for the 2026 World Athletics Relays in Botswana, and ran as part of the Canadian women's 4 x 400 metres team which won their heat on the opening day. The following day, she ran as Canada won the bronze medal in the event.
