= Annkathrin Hoven =

German athlete (born 2001)

- Hoven in 2022

Personal information
- Nationality: German
- Born: 8 March 2001 (age 25) Düsseldorf, Germany

Sport
- Sport: Athletics
- Event: 400 metres

Annkathrin Hoven (born 8 March 2001) is a German sprinter who specialises in the 400 metres.

== Biography ==
From Düsseldorf, and a member of TSV Bayer 04 Leverkusen, Hoven initially competed as a multi-event athlete and finished fifth in the heptathlon at the 2018 European Athletics U18 Championships in Győr. She competed for Germany at the 2023 European Athletics U23 Championships in Espoo, Finland in the 4 x 400 metres relay.

In February 2025, she placed third over 400 metres at the German Indoor Championships. She competed at the 2025 World Athletics Relays in China in the Women's 4 × 400 metres relay in May 2025. She also competed for Germany in the Mixed 4 × 400 metres relay at the event.

In May 2026, she competed for the German team at the 2026 World Athletics Relays in Gaborone, Botswana, running in the women's 4 × 400 m relay, helping the team qualify for the 2027 World Championships, alongside Skadi Schier, Irina Goor and Jana Lakner. She placed third over 400 metres at the 2026 German Championships in July. In August, she was a finalist in the 4 x 400 metres relay at the 2026 European Athletics Championships in Birmingham.
