= Ilaria Accame =

Italian sprinter (born 2001)

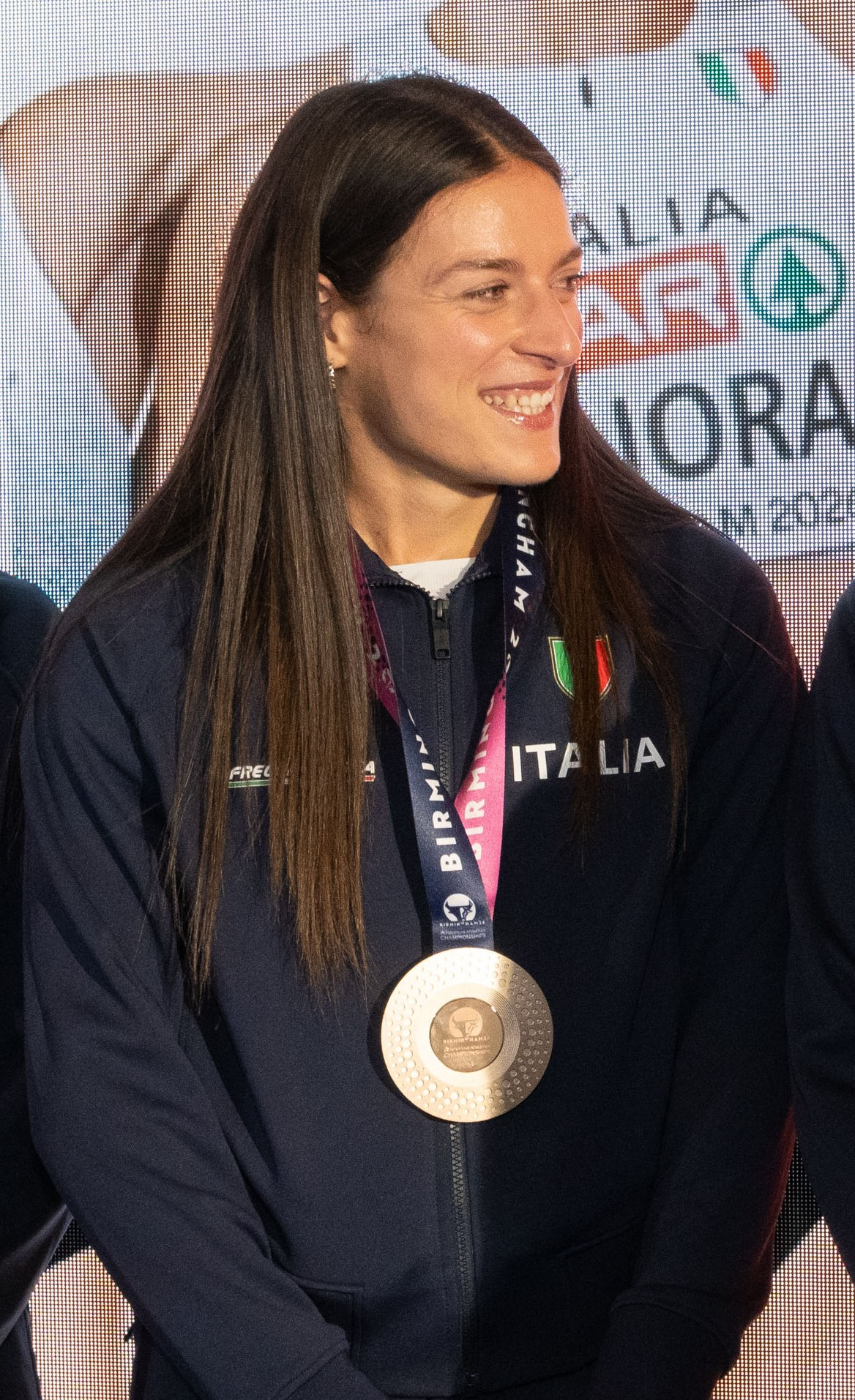
- Accame in 2026

Personal information
- Full name: Ilaria Elvira Accame
- National team: Italy
- Born: 31 August 2001 (age 25) Savona, Italy
- Height: 1.74 m (5 ft 9 in)
- Weight: 63 kg (139 lb)

Sport
- Sport: Athletics
- Event: 400 m
- Club: Atletica Libertas Unicusano Livorno
- Coached by: Ezio Madonia

Achievements and titles
- Personal best: 400 m: 51.98 (2024)
Medal record
European Championships
Bronze medal – third place	2026 Birmingham	4 × 400 m relay
Mediterranean Games
Gold medal – first place	2026 Taranto	4 × 400 m relay
Silver medal – second place	2026 Taranto	4 × 400 m mixed relay

Ilaria Elvira Accame (born 31 August 2001) is an Olympian Italian sprinter, national record holder of the 4 × 400 m relay with the Italian relay team set during the final of the European Athletics Championships in Rome 2024.

== Career ==
Gold medal in 4 × 400 m W at Mediterranean Games U23 in Pescara. National champion in 400 m U23(Agropoli 2023). 10th place in 400 m at Espoo European Championship 2023. Selected to be part of the Italian athletics team for the 2024 European Athletics Championships. Participating at Paris Olympic Games in 2024 with the Italian team on 4 × 400 m W

== National records ==
- 4 × 400 metres relay: 3:23.40 (Rome, Italy, 12 June 2024) - current holder with Giancarla Trevisan (2nd leg), Anna Polinari, (3rd leg), Alice Mangione (4th leg).

== See also ==
- List of Italian records in athletics
- Italian all-time lists - 4 × 400 m relay
