= Alicja Wrona-Kutrzepa =

Polish track and field athlete (born 1996)

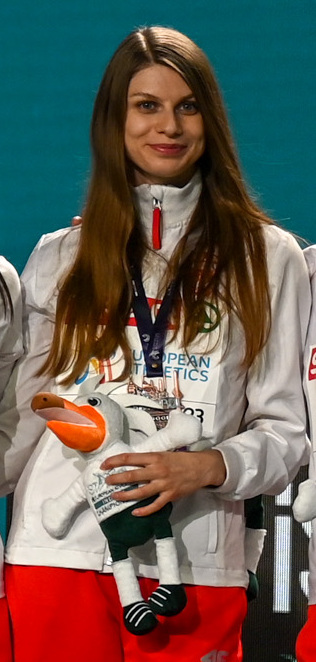
- Wrona-Kutrzepa in 2023

Personal information
- Born: Alicja Wrona; 11 January 1996 (age 30)
- Height: 1.74 m (5 ft 9 in)

Sport
- Club: AZS UMCS Lublin

Alicja Wrona-Kutrzepa (born 11 January 1996) is a Polish sprinter.

== Background ==
She was an athlete for SKB Kraśnik (2010–2013) and has represented AZS UMCS Lublin since 2014. She is a Polish champion in the 4 × 400 meters relay at the 2021 Polish Athletics Championships and the mixed 4 × 400 meters relay at the 2019 Polish Relay Championships. Additionally, she is a two-time bronze medalist at the Polish Senior Championships (2019 in the 200 meters and 2020 in the 4 × 400 meters relay) She won a bronze medal at the 2023 European Athletics Indoor Championships in Istanbul in the 4 × 400 meters relay.
