= Kaylyn Brown =

American athlete (born 2004)

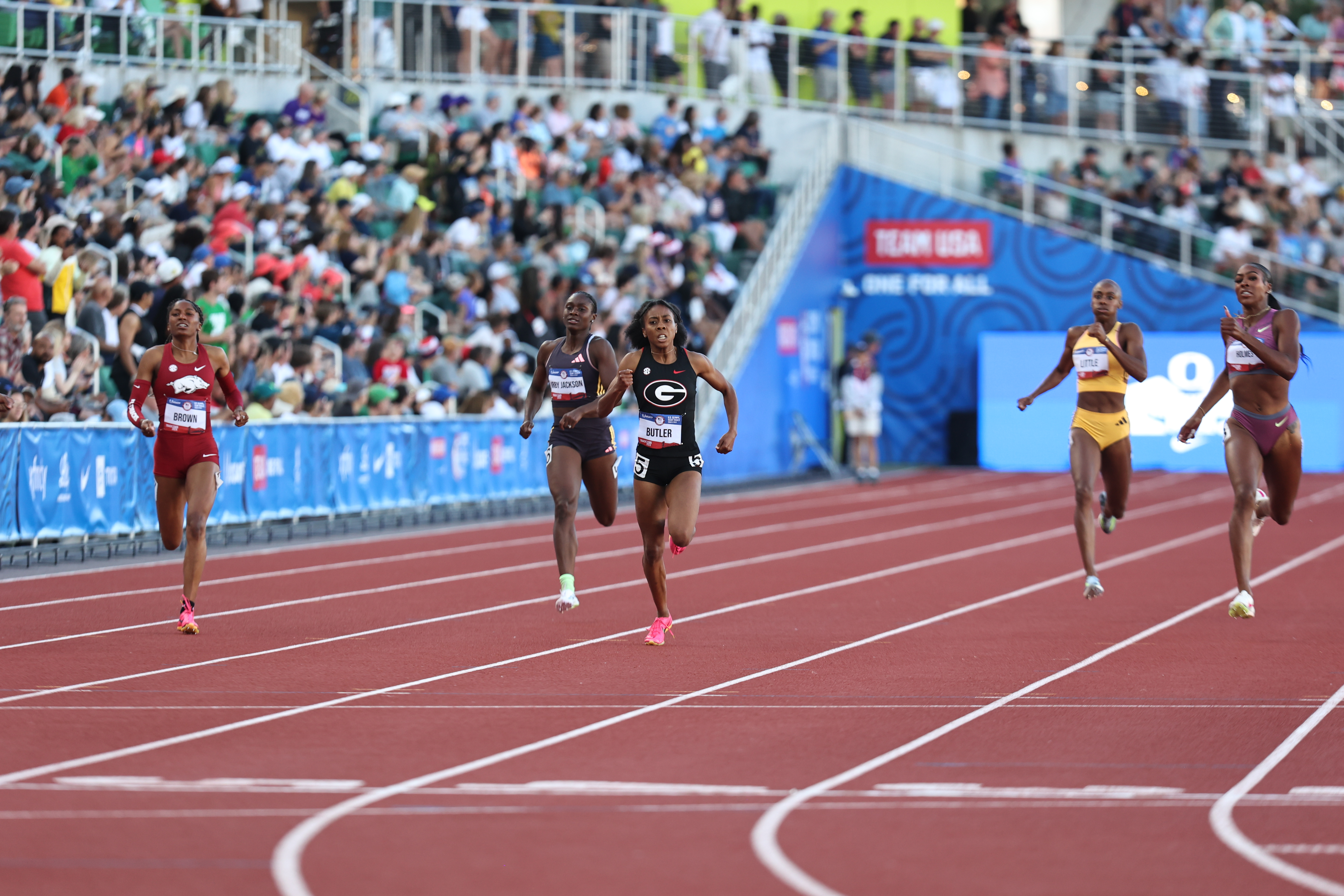
- Brown in 2024

Personal information
- Born: December 31, 2004 (age 21) Ranlo, North Carolina, U.S.

Sport
- Sport: Athletics
- Events: Sprints; Relays
- College team: University of Arkansas

Achievements and titles
- Personal bests: 400 m: 49.13 (Eugene, 2024)
Medal record
Women's athletics
Representing United States
Olympic Games
Gold medal – first place	2024 Paris	4 × 400 m relay
Silver medal – second place	2024 Paris	4 × 400 m mixed
World U20 Championships
Gold medal – first place	2022 Cali	4 × 400 m mixed

Kaylyn Brown (born December 31, 2004) is an American sprinter. She won a gold and silver medal at the 2024 Summer Olympics in the women 4 × 400 metres relay and mixed 4 × 400 metres relay.

== Early life ==
Brown attended Mallard Creek High School in Charlotte, North Carolina. Since 2023, she has attended the University of Arkansas.

== Career ==
She won a gold medal as part of the victorious Mixed 4 × 400 m relay team at the 2022 World Athletics U20 Championships in Cali, Colombia. In the preliminary round the team of Brown, Charlie Bartholomew, Madison Whyte and Will Sumner set a meeting record time of 3:18.65.

In April 2024, she broke 50-seconds for the 400 metres for the first time, running 49.95 seconds during the Tom Jones Invitational held in Gainesville, Florida. With the run she met the qualifying standard for the 2024 Paris Olympics.

She ran a new personal best time of 49.47 seconds for the 400 metres at the SEC Outdoor Championships in Gainesville, Florida on May 11, 2024. It placed her fourth all-time for a College athlete and was the fastest all-time performance by a 19-year-old American and second globally for her age, only behind East German athlete Grit Breuer who ran 49.42 in 1991. At the NCAA Championships in Eugene, Oregon on June 8, 2024 she lowered her personal best to 49.13 seconds.

She competed in the women's 4 × 400 metres relay at the 2024 Paris Olympics, winning the gold medal as part of the American relay team. She also competed in the mixed 4 × 400 m relay at the Games, winning the silver medal.

In June 2025, Brown finished fifth overall in the 400m at the 2025 NCAA Outdoor Championships in Eugene, Oregon. The following year, she qualified for the 2026 NCAA Division I Indoor Track and Field Championships, where was a member of the winning University of Arkansas 4 x 400 metres relay team. That spring, she was part of an Arkansas 4 x 400 team that ran 3:22.06, the fifth fastest time in NCAA history and ran a facility record 49.77 seconds for the 400 m at the NCAA regionals. She also qualified for the 2026 NCAA Outdoor Championships in the individual 400 metres.
