= Johanna Martin =

German athlete

Personal information
- Nationality: German
- Born: 10 April 2006 (age 20)

Sport
- Sport: Athletics
- Event: 400 metres

Achievements and titles
- Personal bests: 400m: 51.30 (Rehlingen, 2026); Indoor; 400m: 51.92 (Dortmund, 2026)
Medal record
Women's athletics
Representing Germany
European U20 Championships
Silver medal – second place	2025 Tampere	400 m

Johanna Martin (born 10 April 2006) is a German sprinter. In 2026, she won her third consecutive title at the German Indoor Athletics Championships over 400 metres.

== Biography ==
=== 2024 ===
In February 2024, aged 17 years-old, Martin ran at her State Indoor Championships in Neubrandenburg. She reached the 60 metres final, where she significantly improved her personal best to 7.76seconds and missed the win by a thousandth of a second. She did secure the win in the 400 metres at the Championships, running an overall personal best of 52.76 seconds, and faster than any German U20 athlete had ever been in an indoor event using electronic timing. This put her first in the rankings among German women and second in the U20 world rankings. Later that month, Martin she also became German senior national indoor champion over 400 metres, competing in Leipzig. She won her heat in 52.55 to move to fourth on the European indoor all-time U20 list, and won the final with a time of 52.71 seconds.

She ran as part of the German Mixed 4 × 400 m relay team at the 2024 World Relays Championships in Nassau, Bahamas. At the event, her German team qualified for the 2024 Paris Olympics.

In May 2024, she was selected for the 2024 European Athletics Championships in Rome. In August 2024, she finished fourth in the 400 metres race at the 2024 World Athletics U20 Championships in Lima, Peru, running a 52.49 seconds personal best in the final.

=== 2025 ===
At the German U20 Indoor Championships in February 2025 in Dortmund, Martin set a new European U20 indoor record with a time of 52.22 for the 400 metres at the age of 18-years-old, to surpass the previous record of 52.37, held by Finland's Ella Räsänen since 2013. That month, again in Dortmund, she retained her German indoor 400 metres title, running a time of 52.30 seconds. She competed at the 2025 World Athletics Relays in China in the Women's 4 × 400 metres relay in May 2025. She also competed in the Mixed 4 × 400 metres relay at the event.

She represented Germany at the 2025 European Athletics Team Championships, where she ran a personal best 51.55 seconds for the 400 metres. She won the silver medal over 400 metres at the 2025 European Athletics U20 Championships in Tampere, Finland.

She was selected for the German team for the 2025 World Athletics Championships in Tokyo, Japan, where she ran in the women's x 400 metres relay and in the mixed 4 × 400 metres relay.

=== 2026 ===
Martin secured a third consecutive national title in the 400 metres at the 2026 German Indoor Athletics Championships in Dortmund, running a new indoors personal best of 51.92 seconds in the heats. On 24 May, Martin improved her overall personal best to 51.30 in Rehlingen, finishing runner-up to Paris Peoples of the United States. Competing at the 2026 European Athletics Championships in Birmingham, England, in August, she was a semi-finalist in the 400 metres.

== Personal life ==
She is from Rostock. She will attend the University of Texas on a full ride scholarship starting in August 2026, following in the footsteps of the German Decathlete Leo Neugebauer.
