= Sarah Carli =

Australian track and field athlete

Personal information
- Nationality: Australian
- Born: 5 September 1994 (age 31) Wollongong, New South Wales, Australia
- Height: 1.60 m (5 ft 3 in)

Sport
- Sport: Athletics
- Event: 400 metres hurdles
Medal record
Women's athletics
Representing Australia
Oceania Area Championships
Gold medal – first place	2024 Suva	400 metres hurdles
Silver medal – second place	2019 Townsville	400 metres hurdles

Sarah Carli (born 5 September 1994) is an Australian track and field athlete who specializes in the 400 metres hurdles. Representing Australia at the 2019 World Athletics Championships, she reached the semi-finals in women's 400 metres hurdles.

Carli qualified for the Tokyo 2020 Olympics but was eliminated after finishing fifth in her heat of the women's 400m hurdles in 56:93 secs.

== Early years ==
Carli was aged eight when she joined Wollongong City Little Athletics with her sister. She has been running ever since.

When Carli was 16 years of age, in December 2010, she won the Australian Schools 400m hurdles in time of 60.52. At the 2011 Australian championships she was placed second and secured selection for the World Youth Championships. At the championships she came second in the final clocking 58.05 seconds which was the fifth fastest in Australian junior history.

== Achievements ==
At the 2019 Canberra Track Classic Carli ran a 55.67, a 1.2 seconds personal best This also made her a Doha World Championships qualifier. Carli's win handed the first defeat in eight years to one of the greats of Australian 400m hurdling - Lauren Boden. She went on to be placed second Oceania Championships.

Carli continued to train in Wollongong and in her first hurdles of the season in December 2020 she ran a personal best of 55.09 and moved up to be the fourth fastest Australian of all time.

== Accident ==
In February 2021, Carli had a serious accident in the gym, severing the carotid artery in her neck when she slipped while lifting weights. Doctors performed emergency surgery using a vein from her thigh to repair it. Recovery was slow, but she resumed racing and in June 2021 she ran 58.53 qualifying her for the Tokyo 2020 Olympics.

== Tokyo 2020 Olympic Games ==
Competing in 400 metres hurdles at the Tokyo 2020 Olympics, Carli placed 5th in her heat and did not advance to the semi-finals.

== Statistics ==
Grand Slam Track results
Slam	Race group	Event	Pl.	Time	Prize money
2025 Miami Slam	Long hurdles	400 m hurdles	5th	54.93	US$15,000
2025 Miami Slam	Long hurdles	400 m	7th	53.01	US$15,000
