= Anna Polinari =

Italian sprinter (born 1999)

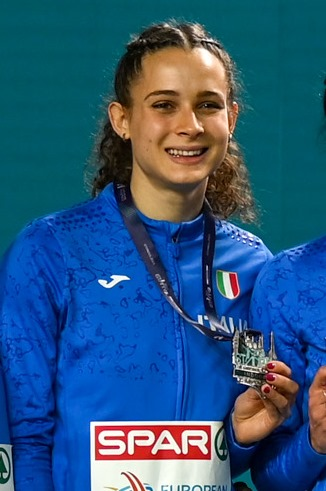
- Polinari on the 4 × 400 m relay Istanbul 2023 podium

Personal information
- National team: Italy
- Born: 7 February 1999 (age 27) Verona, Italy
- Height: 1.75 m (5 ft 9 in)
- Weight: 61 kg (134 lb)

Sport
- Sport: Athletics
- Event: 400 m
- Club: Atletica Brescia 1950; C.S. Carabinieri
- Coached by: Fabio Lotti

Achievements and titles
- Personal best: 400 m: 50.36 (2026)
Medal record
Women's athletics
Representing Italy
European Championships
Silver medal – second place	2024 Rome	4 × 400 m mixed
Bronze medal – third place	2026 Birmingham	4 × 400 m relay
European Indoor Championships
Silver medal – second place	2023 Istanbul	4 × 400 m relay
Mediterranean Games
Gold medal – first place	2022 Oran	4 × 400 m relay

Anna Polinari (born 7 February 1999) is an Italian sprinter.

== Career ==
Polinari was selected to be part of the Italian athletics team for the Tokyo 2020 Olympics, as a member of the relay team. She studies sports science at the University of Verona and is trained by ex-800 m runner Fabio Lotti.

== Statistics ==
=== National records ===
- 4 × 400 metres relay: 3:23.40 (Rome, Italy, 12 June 2024) - current holder with Giancarla Trevisan (2nd leg), Ilaria Accame, (1st leg), Alice Mangione (4th leg).

== National titles ==
Polinari won anational championships at individual senior level.

- Italian Athletics Championships
  - 400 m: 2025
