= Barbora Malíková =

Czech sprinter

Personal information
- Nationality: Czech
- Born: 30 December 2001 (age 24) Opava, Czech Republic

Sport
- Sport: Athletics
- Event: 400 metres
Medal record
World University Games
Gold medal – first place	2025 Bochum	400 m
Bronze medal – third place	2021 Chengdu	400 m

Barbora Malíková (born 30 December 2001) is a Czech athlete. She competed in the women's 400 metres event at the 2020 Summer Olympics.
