= List of Spanish records in athletics =

The following are the national records in athletics in Spain maintained by its national athletics federation: Real Federación Española de Atletismo (RFEA).

== Outdoor ==
Key to tables: Awaiting ratification Record not kept by RFEA Not ratified or later rescinded by RFEA

=== Men ===
Event	Record	Athlete	Date	Meet	Place	Ref.
100 m	10.06 (+1.0 m/s)	Bruno Hortelano	23 June 2016,	Meeting de Atletismo Madrid	Madrid, Spain	
150 m (bend)	15.42 (−1.7 m/s)	Bruno Hortelano	10 August 2020 (Note: by RFEA source; 9 August 2020 by World Athletics source)	Andorra Open Championships	Andorra la Vella, Andorra	
200 m	20.04 (+0.8 m/s)	Bruno Hortelano	22 July 2018	Spanish Championships	Getafe, Spain	
300 m	32.56	Antonio Sánchez	20 June 1987		Salamanca, Spain	
300 m	32.29	Óscar Husillos	20 January 2018		Salamanca, Spain	
400 m	44.69	Bruno Hortelano	22 June 2018	Meeting de Atletismo Madrid	Madrid, Spain	
500 m	1:00.13	Julio Arenas	29 May 2026	XXVI Trofeo Atletismo Ciudad de Fuenlabrada	Fuenlabrada, Spain	
600 m	1:14.79 A	Antonio Manuel Reina	28 July 2012		Ávila, Spain	
800 m	1:42.04	Mohamed Attaoui	12 July 2024	Herculis	Fontvieille, Monaco	
1000 m	2:12.25	Mohamed Attaoui	3 September 2025	Volksbank Trier Eifel Flutlichtmeeting	Trier, Germany	
1500 m	3:28.76	Mohamed Katir	9 July 2021	Herculis	Monaco, Monaco	
Mile	3:47.69	Mario García	16 September 2023	Prefontaine Classic	Eugene, United States	
Mile (road)
Mile (road)	3:56.92	Martín Segurola	19 September 2026	World Road Running Championships	Copenhagen, Denmark	
2000 m	4:49.85	Mario García	8 September 2023	Memorial Van Damme	Brussels, Belgium	
3000 m	7:27.64	Mohamed Katir	13 July 2021	British Grand Prix	Gateshead, United Kingdom	
5000 m	12:45.01	Mohamed Katir	21 July 2023	Herculis	Monaco, Monaco	
5 km (road)	13:08	Thierry Ndikumwenayo	26 April 2025	Adizero: Road to Records	Herzogenaurach, Germany	
10,000 m	26:49.49	Thierry Ndikumwenayo	2 August 2024	Olympic Games	Paris, France	
10 km (road)	27:25 (Note: by World Athletics and RFEA; 27:21 by other sources)	Said Mechaal	11 January 2026	10K Valencia Ibercaja	Valencia, Spain	
10 km (road)	27:19 a	Mohamed Katir	31 December 2022	San Silvestre Vallecana	Madrid, Spain	
10 km (road)	26:46 a	Adel Mechaal	24 November 2024	Zara Speed Run	Madrid, Spain	
15,000 m (track)	43:36.9+	Daniel Mateo	20 April 2021		La Nucía, Spain	
15 km (road)	41:32+	Rodrigue Kwizera	25 October 2026	Valencia Half Marathon	Valencia, Spain	
20,000 m (track)	58:17.3+	Daniel Mateo	20 April 2021		La Nucía, Spain	
20 km (road)	55:12+	Rodrigue Kwizera	25 October 2026	Valencia Half Marathon	Valencia, Spain	
One hour	20,593 m	Daniel Mateo	20 April 2021		La Nucía, Spain	
Half marathon	59:39	Carlos Mayo	22 October 2023	Valencia Half Marathon	Valencia, Spain	
Half marathon	58:03	Rodrigue Kwizera	25 October 2026	Valencia Half Marathon	Valencia, Spain	
25 km (road)	1:14:37+	Hamid Ben Daoub Ben Akki	5 May 2019		Prague, Czech Republic	
30,000 m (track)	1:36:07.8	Carlos Pérez	2 September 1969		A Coruña, Spain	
30 km (road)	1:29:28+	Fabián Roncero	19 April 1998	Rotterdam Marathon	Rotterdam, Netherlands	
Marathon	2:05:48	Tariku Novales	3 December 2023	Valencia Marathon	Valencia, Spain	
50 km	2:47:51 (Note: by federation source; 2:47:42 by other sources)	Iraitz Arrospide	1 September 2019	50km World Championships	Brasov, Romania	
100 km (track)	6:21:06 (Note: road record by RFEA source, probably a typo)	Carlos Gazapo	3 May 2025		Málaga, Spain	
100 km (road)	6:23:44	José María González Muñoz	16 June 2006		Torhout, Belgium	
24 hours (road)	273.393 km	Ivan Penalba	18 September 2022	IAU 24 Hour European Championships	Verona, Italy	
110 m hurdles	13.04 (±0.0 m/s)	Orlando Ortega	15 July 2016	Herculis	Monaco, Monaco	
400 m hurdles	48.11	Jesús David Delgado	16 June 2026	Golden Spike Ostrava	Ostrava, Czechia	
3000 m steeplechase	8:05.69	Fernando Carro	12 July 2019	Herculis	Monaco, Monaco	
High jump	2.34 m	Arturo Ortíz	22 June 1991		Barcelona, Spain	
Pole vault	5.81 m	Montxu Miranda	2 September 2000		Barcelona, Spain	
Long jump	8.56 m (+1.3 m/s)	Yago Lamela	24 June 1999		Turin, Italy	
Triple jump	18.18 m (−0.3 m/s)	Jordan Díaz (Note: Jordan Díaz is eligible to represent ESP in National Representative Competitions from 7 June 2024)	11 June 2024	European Championships	Rome, Italy	
Shot put	21.47 m	Manuel Martínez	10 July 2002		Salamanca, Spain	
Discus throw	69.50 m	Mario Pestano	27 July 2008		Santa Cruz de Tenerife, Spain	
Hammer throw	79.38 m	Javier Cienfuegos	6 September 2019	Memorial Francisco Ramón Higueras	Andújar, Spain	
Javelin throw	84.80 m	Odei Jainaga	29 May 2021	European Team Championships Super League	Chorzów, Poland	
Decathlon	8526 pts	Francisco Javier Benet	16–17 May 1998		Alhama de Murcia, Spain	
Decathlon	100m (wind) / Long jump (wind) / Shot put / High jump / 400m / 110m H (wind) / Discus / Pole vault / Javelin / 1500m; 10.72 (+2.9 m/s) / 7.45 m (−1.2 m/s) / 14.57 m / 1.92 m / 48.10 / 13.83 (+1.8 m/s) / 46.12 m / 5.00 m / 65.37 m / 4:26.81					
Decathlon	8534 pts (Note: wind-assisted)	Antonio Peñalver	23–24 May 1994		Alhama de Murcia, Spain	
Decathlon	100m (wind) / Long jump (wind) / Shot put / High jump / 400m / 110m H (wind) / Discus / Pole vault / Javelin / 1500m; 10.76 (+3.9 m/s) / 7.42 m (+6.2 m/s) / 16.50 m / 2.12 m / 49.50 / 14.32 (+0.8 m/s) / 47.38 m / 5.00 m / 59.32 m / 4:39.94					
Mile walk (track)	5:36.27	Diego García	9 July 2017	London Grand Prix	London, United Kingdom	
3000 m walk (track)	11:00.50+	Paquillo Fernández	8 June 2007		Villeneuve-d'Ascq, France	
5000 m walk (track)	18:22.02	Paul McGrath	25 May 2024	Spanish Clubs Championships Division Honor Liga Joma-Permanence	Barcelona, Spain	
10,000 m walk (track)	37:53:09	Paquillo Fernández	27 July 2008		Santa Cruz de Tenerife, Spain	
10 km walk (road)	37:52	Paquillo Fernández	8 June 2002		Kraków, Poland	
20 km walk (road)	1:17:22	Paquillo Fernández	28 April 2002		Turku, Finland	
35 km walk (road)	2:23:48	Miguel Ángel López	18 May 2025	European Race Walking Team Championships	Poděbrady, Czech Republic	
50 km walk (road)	3:38:43	Valentí Massana	20 March 1994		Ourense, Spain	
4 × 100 m relay	38.46	Spain; Eduard Viles; Sergio Ruiz; Bruno Hortelano; Ángel David Rodríguez	18 August 2013	World Championships	Moscow, Russia	
4 × 200 m relay	1:23.69	J. Prado; I. Homillos; J. Arques; Antonio Sánchez	28 June 1986		Madrid, Spain	
4 × 400 m relay	3:00.26 A	Spain; Markel Fernández; Samuel García; Manuel Guijarro; Óscar Husillos	2 May 2026	World Relays	Gaborene, Botswana	
4 × 800 m relay	7:16.99	Spain; Miguel Quesada; José Manuel Cerezo; Juan de Dios Jurado; Eugenio Barrios	25 August 2006	Memorial Van Damme	Brussels, Belgium	
4 × 1500 m relay	14:46.16	Spain; Anacleto Jiménez; Manuel Pancorbo; Alberto García; Isaac Viciosa	5 September 1997		Madrid, Spain	

=== Women ===
Event	Record	Athlete	Date	Meet	Place	Ref.
100 m	11.06 (+1.7 m/s)	Sandra Myers	23 July 1991		Vigo, Spain	
150 m (straight)	17.55 (−0.6 m/s)	Estela García	17 April 2016		Sant Cugat del Vallès, Spain	
200 m	22.19 (+0.8 m/s)	Jaël Bestué	29 June 2025	European Team Championships	Madrid, Spain	
300 m	36.92	Paula Sevilla	20 May 2023		Fuenlabrada, Spain	
400 m	49.67	Sandra Myers	6 July 1991	Bislett Games	Oslo, Norway	
500 m	1:10.63	Laura Bueno	29 April 2017		Granada, Spain	
600 m	1:26.21	Laura Bueno	11 July 2018	Míting Internacional d´Atletisme Ciutat de Barcelona	Barcelona, Spain	
800 m	1:57.45	Maite Zúñiga	1 June 1988		Seville, Spain	
1000 m	2:33.06	Mayte Martínez	13 September 2007		Huelva, Spain	
1500 m	3:57.75	Marta Pérez	8 August 2024	Olympic Games	Paris, France	
Mile	4:20.12	Esther Guerrero	19 July 2025	London Athletics Meet	London, United Kingdom	
Mile (road)	4:34.12 Wo	Marta Pérez	1 October 2023	World Road Running Championships	Riga, Latvia	
2000 m	5:32.86	Marta García	12 July 2024	Herculis	Fontvieille, Monaco	
3000 m	8:28.80	Marta Domínguez	11 August 2000	Weltklasse Zürich	Zürich, Switzerland	
5000 m	14:33.40	Marta García	22 August 2025	Memorial Van Damme	Brussels, Belgium	
5 km (road)	15:11	Marta Domínguez	1 September 2002		London, United Kingdom	
5 km (road)	14:59 Wo	Marta García	19 September 2026	World Road Running Championships	Copenhagen, Denmark	
10,000 m	30:51.69	Marta Domínguez	7 August 2006	European Championships	Gothenburg, Sweden	
10 km (road)	31:11	Carla Gallardo	24 May 2025	Ruta Villa de Laredo	Laredo, Spain	
10 km (road)	31:00 a	Marta Pérez	24 November 2024	Zara Speed Run	Madrid, Spain	
15 km (road)	48:46+ Mx	Carla Gallardo	29 March 2026	Berlin Half Marathon	Berlin, Germany	
One hour (track)	17,546 m	Marta Galimany	4 September 2020	Memorial van Damme	Brussels, Belgium	
20,000 m (track)	1:27:49.0	María Antonia Griñó	8 December 1978		Mataró, Spain	
20 km (road)	1:05:00+ Mx	Laura Luengo	25 October 2026	Valencia Half Marathon	Valencia, Spain	
Half marathon	1:08:30 Mx	Carla Gallardo	29 March 2026	Berlin Half Marathon	Berlin, Germany	
Half marathon	1:08:28 Mx	Laura Luengo	25 October 2026	Valencia Half Marathon	Valencia, Spain	
Half marathon	1:10:06 Wo	Rocío Rios Pérez	4 October 1997		Košice, Slovakia	
25 km (road)	1:23:41+	Majida Maayouf	3 December 2023	Valencia Marathon	Valencia, Spain	
30 km (road)	1:40:26+	Majida Maayouf	3 December 2023	Valencia Marathon	Valencia, Spain	
Marathon	2:21:27	Majida Maayouf	3 December 2023	Valencia Marathon	Valencia, Spain	
100 km (road)	7:47:46	Estefanía Unzu	22 February 2025	Australian 100km Championships	Canberra, Australia	
24 hours (road)	249.480 km	Carmen Maria Pérez	19 October 2025	IAU 24 Hour World Championship	Albi, France	
100 m hurdles	12.50 (+0.8 m/s)	Josephine Onyia	1 June 2008	ISTAF	Berlin, Germany	
300 m hurdles	40.18	Sara Gallego	22 September 2020		Barcelona, Spain	
400 m hurdles	54.34	Sara Gallego	26 June 2022	Spanish Championships	Nerja, Spain	
2000 m steeplechase	6:13.03	Irene Sánchez-Escribano	15 August 2020		Cergy-Pontoise, France	
3000 m steeplechase	9:09.39	Marta Domínguez	25 July 2009		Barcelona, Spain	
3000 m steeplechase	9:07.32	Marta Domínguez	17 August 2009	World Championships	Berlin, Germany	
High jump	2.02 m	Ruth Beitia	4 August 2007		San Sebastián, Spain	
Pole vault	4.51 m (Note: indoor mark ratified as absolute record)	Naroa Agirre	10 May 2014	24th International Meeting	Valladolid, Spain	
Long jump	7.06 m (−0.1 m/s)	Niurka Montalvo	23 August 1999	World Championships	Seville, Spain	
Triple jump	14.87 m (+0.5 m/s)	Ana Peleteiro	1 August 2021	Olympic Games	Tokyo, Japan	
Shot put	18.80 m	Belén Toimil	29 June 2021		Castellón de la Plana, Spain	
Discus throw	61.89 m	Sabina Asenjo	25 June 2016		Bilbao, Spain	
Hammer throw	72.00 m	Laura Redondo	18 June 2022	Meeting de Atletismo Madrid	Madrid, Spain	
Javelin throw	64.07 m	Mercedes Chilla	12 June 2010	Liga de Clubes de División de Honor	Valencia, Spain	
Heptathlon	6372 pts	María Vicente	14–15 August 2026	European Championships	Birmingham, United Kingdom	
Heptathlon	100m H (wind) / High jump / Shot put / 200m (wind) / Long jump (wind) / Javelin / 800m; 13.38 (−0.6 m/s) / 1.77 m / 13.09 m / 23.71(+3.4 m/s) / 6.42 m (+1.5 m/s) / 44.02 m / 2:14.81					
Decathlon	6614 pts	María Peinado	22–23 October 2005		Castellón de la Plana, Spain	
Decathlon	100m (wind) / Long jump (wind) / Shot put / High jump / 400m / 110m H (wind) / Discus / Pole vault / Javelin / 1500m; 13.29 (±0.0 m/s) / 5.62 m (+2.3 m/s) / 11.76 m / 1.63 m / 1:00.67 / 14.53 (+0.3 m/s) / 30.93 m / 3.00 m / 31.13 m / 5:32.61					
3000 m walk (track)	12:00.87	María Pérez	8 June 2018		Huelva, Spain	
5000 m walk (track)	20:28.17	María Pérez	30 April 2022	Spanish Club Championships	Andújar, Spain	
10,000 m walk (track)	42:14.12	Raquel González	23 July 2016	Spanish Championships	Gijón, Spain	
10,000 m walk (track)	42:12.93	María Pérez	25 July 2026	Spanish Championships	Málaga, Spain	
10 km walk (road)	43:02	María Vasco	20 August 1998		Budapest, Hungary	
20 km walk (road)	1:25:30	María Pérez	26 March 2023	Spanish 20km Race Walking Championships	Córdoba, Spain	
Half marathon walk (road)	1:30:06	María Pérez	15 August 2026	European Championships	Birmingham, United Kingdom	
35 km walk (road)	2:37:15	María Pérez	21 May 2023	European Race Walking Team Championships	Poděbrady, Czech Republic	
50 km walk (road)	4:05:46	Júlia Takács	19 May 2019	European Cup	Alytus, Lithuania	
4 × 100 m relay	42.11	Spain; Esperança Cladera; Jaël Bestué; Paula Sevilla; María Isabel Pérez	28 June 2025	European Team Championships	Madrid, Spain	
4 × 400 m relay	3:24.13	Spain; Paula Sevilla; Eva Santidrián; Daniela Fra; Blanca Hervás	11 May 2025	World Relays	Guangzhou, China	
4 × 800 m relay	8:50.0	Federación Catalana; Carmen Romero; Carmen Bes; Marta Bosch; Carmen Rovira	20 June 1990		Manresa, Spain	
4 × 1500 m relay	18:43.44	Mislata-Playas de Castellón; Laura Picó; Inmaculada Francisco; Dolores Peñarrocha; Noemí Bachero	5 June 1999		Castellón de la Plana, Spain	

=== Mixed ===
Event	Record	Athlete	Date	Meet	Place	Ref.
4 × 100 m relay
4 × 100 m relay	40.42	Spain; Guillem Crespí; María Isabel Pérez; Andoni Calbano; Jaël Bestué	16 August 2026	European Championships	Birmingham, United Kingdom	
4 × 400 m relay	3:10.48	Spain; Manuel Guijarro; Blanca Hervás; Julio Arenas; Paula Sevilla	29 June 2025	European Team Championships	Madrid, Spain	

== Indoor ==
=== Men ===
Event	Record	Athlete	Date	Meet	Place	Ref.
50 m	5.67+	Venancio José	14 March 2001		Madrid, Spain	
60 m	6.52	Yunier Pérez (Note: Pérez (ex-CUB) gained Spanish citizenship on 11 January 2018)	6 February 2018	PSD Bank Meeting	Düsseldorf, Germany	
60 m	6.3 h	Pedro Pablo Nolet	15 January 2000		Oviedo, Spain	
200 m	20.65	Adrià Alfonso	23 February 2025	Spanish Championships	Madrid, Spain	
300 m	32.39	Óscar Husillos	20 January 2018	Salamanca Provincial Championships	Salamanca, Spain	
400 m	45.58	Óscar Husillos	19 February 2023	Spanish Championships	Madrid, Spain	
500 m	1:01.91	Mark Ujakpor	2 February 2017	Trofeo Chamartín	Madrid, Spain	
800 m	1:44.48	Mohamed Attaoui	21 March 2026	World Championships	Toruń, Poland	
1000 m	2:14.52	Mohamed Attaoui	6 February 2026	Villa de Madrid Indoor Meeting	Madrid, Spain	
1500 m	3:33.28	Adel Mechaal	25 February 2023	World Indoor Tour Final	Birmingham, United Kingdom	
Mile	3:51.79	Mario Garcia Romo	11 February 2023	Millrose Games	New York City, United States	
2000 m	4:52.90	Sergio Sánchez	23 January 2010		Oviedo, Spain	
3000 m	7:24.68	Mohamed Katir	15 February 2023	Meeting Hauts-de-France Pas-de-Calais	Liévin, France	
Two miles	8:32.45	Manuel Pancorbo	4 March 1992		San Sebastián, Spain	
5000 m	13:11.39	Alberto García	9 February 2003	Indoor Flanders Meeting	Ghent, Belgium	
50 m hurdles	6.48	Javier Moracho	22 February 1981		Grenoble, France	
55 m hurdles	7.22	Javier Moracho	13 February 1982		Moscow, United States	
60 m hurdles	7.42	Enrique Llopis	21 March 2026	World Championships	Toruń, Poland	
400 m hurdles	50.82	Sergio Fernandez	27 January 2018	Meeting Elite en salle de l'Eure	Val-de-Reuil, France	
2000 m steeplechase	5:28.77	Víctor Ruiz	12 January 2020		Madrid, Spain	
High jump	2.31 m	Arturo Ortíz	18 February 1990		San Sebastián, Spain	
High jump	2.31 m	Arturo Ortíz	14 February 1993		Gundelsheim, Germany	
Pole vault	5.80 m	José Manuel Arcos	27 February 1999		Zaragoza, Spain	
Long jump	8.56 m	Yago Lamela	7 March 1999	World Championships	Maebashi, Japan	
Triple jump	17.59 m	Jordan Díaz	19 February 2023	Spanish Championships	Madrid, Spain	
Shot put	21.26 m	Manuel Martínez	2 March 2002	European Championships	Vienna, Austria	
Weight throw	21.82 m	Kevin Arreaga	31 January 2020	Texas Tech Invitational	Lubbock, United States	
Heptathlon	6249 pts	Jorge Ureña	28–29 January 2017	ESP-FRA-GBR-POL-CZE Combined Challenge	Prague, Czech Republic	
Heptathlon	60m / Long jump / Shot put / High jump / 60m H / Pole vault / 1000m; 6.91 / 7.62m / 13.96m / 2.04m / 7.85 / 5.00m / 2:40.06					
3000 m walk	11:06.57	Diego García	25 February 2018	Glasgow Grand Prix	Glasgow, United Kingdom	
5000 m walk	18:24.13	Paquillo Fernández	17 February 2007		Belfast, United Kingdom	
4 × 200 m relay	1:25.56	Spain; López; Ángel Heras; Andrés Capellán; Gay	10 February 1990		Paris, France	
4 × 400 m relay	3:05.18	Spain; Markel Fernández; Manuel Guijarro; Óscar Husillos; Bernat Erta	9 March 2025	European Championships	Apeldoorn, Netherlands	

=== Women ===
Event	Record	Athlete	Date	Meet	Place	Ref.
50 m	6.28+	Sandra Myers	9 February 1995		Madrid, Spain	
60 m	7.15	María Isabel Pérez	23 February 2025	Spanish Championships	Madrid, Spain	
200 m	22.69	Jaël Bestué	8 February 2026	Meeting Metz Moselle	Metz, France	
300 m	37.19	Paula Sevilla	19 December 2021		Madrid, Spain	
400 m	50.99	Sandra Myers	10 March 1991		Seville, Spain	
400 m	50.99	Paula Sevilla	8 March 2025	European Championships	Apeldoorn, Netherlands	
500 m	1:11.63+	Laura Bueno	29 December 2018		Antequera, Spain	
600 m	1:28.14	Laura Bueno	12 January 2019		Antequera, Spain	
800 m	1:59.52	Mayte Martínez	8 February 2004	Indoor Flanders Meeting	Ghent, Belgium	
1000 m	2:37.57	Esther Guerrero	13 January 2024		Antequera, Spain	
1500 m	4:01.77	Nuria Fernández	14 February 2009		Valencia, Spain	
Mile	4:23.88	Marta Pérez	11 February 2024	Millrose Games	New York City, United States	
2000 m	5:42.43+ (Note: en route timing by RFEA source; 5:42.53 by World Athletics source)	Esther Guerrero	25 January 2025	Antequera Indoor Match	Antequera, Spain	
3000 m	8:34.28	Marta García	19 February 2026	Meeting Hauts-de-France Pas-de-Calais	Liévin, France	
5000 m	14:46.37	Marta García	27 January 2024	BU John Thomas Terrier Classic	Boston, United States	
50 m hurdles	6.75+	Josephine Onyia	21 February 2008	GE Galan	Stockholm, Sweden	
60 m hurdles	7.83	Glory Alozie	15 March 2003	World Championships	Birmingham, United Kingdom	
400 m hurdles	59.53	Nora Suárez	28 January 2024	Andalusian Championships	Antequera, Spain	
High jump	2.01 m	Ruth Beitia	24 February 2007		Piraeus, Greece	
Pole vault	4.56 m	Naroa Agirre	17 February 2007		Seville, Spain	
Long jump	6.88 m	Niurka Montalvo	10 March 2001	World Championships	Lisbon, Portugal	
Triple jump	14.75 m	Ana Peleteiro	3 March 2024	World Championships	Glasgow, United Kingdom	
Shot put	18.64 m	María Belén Toimil	4 March 2021	European Championships	Toruń, Poland	
Weight throw	18.09 m	Raquel Ruth Sola	27 January 2007		Seattle, United States	
Pentathlon	4728 pts	María Vicente	28 January 2024	X-Athletics Meeting	Aubière, France	
Pentathlon	60m H / High jump / Shot put / Long jump / 800m; 8.24 / 1.76 m / 13.84 m / 6.65 m / 2:15.50					
3000 m walk	12:23.46	María José Poves	9 March 2014		Zaragoza, Spain	
4 × 200 m relay	1:35.50	Spain; Cristina Castro; Sandra Myers; Gregoria Ferrer; Blanca Lacambra	10 February 1990		Paris, France	
4 × 400 m relay	3:25.68	Spain; Paula Sevilla; Eva Santidrián; Daniela Fra; Blanca Hervás	9 March 2025	European Championships	Apeldoorn, Netherlands	

=== Mixed ===
Event	Record	Athlete	Date	Meet	Place	Ref.
4 × 200 m relay	1:33.10	Spain; Jaël Bestué; Eva Santidrián; Luis Salort; Alfredo Jiménez	25 February 2018		Minsk, Belarus	
4 × 400 m relay	3:16.96	Spain; Markel Fernandez; Paula Sevilla; David García; Blanca Hervas	21 March 2026	World Championships	Toruń, Poland	
