= Daniela Fra =

Spanish sprinter

Personal information
- Full name: Daniela Fra Palmer
- Born: 29 February 2000 (age 26)
- Height: 180 cm (5 ft 11 in)

Sport
- Sport: Athletics
- Event(s): Sprint, Hurdles
Medal record
Women's athletics
Representing Spain
World Indoor Championships
Bronze medal – third place	2026 Toruń	4 × 400 m relay
World Relays
Gold medal – first place	2025 Guangzhou	4×400 m relay

Daniela Fra Palmer (born 29 February 2000) is a Spanish hurdler and sprinter. She won the Spanish Championships in the 400 metres hurdles in 2023 and 2024. She was a member of Spanish 4 x 400 metres relay teams which set indoor national records in both the women’s and mixed relay events at the 2025 European Athletics Indoor Championships.

== Biography ==
She is a member of an athletics club in Arroyomolinos, Madrid. She won the Spanish Athletics Championships in the 400 metres hurdles in July 2023 in 55.85 seconds. She retained her title in June 2024 in La Nucia in a time of 55.92 seconds, finishing ahead of Sara Gallego. She competed for Spain in the 400m hurdles at the 2024 European Athletics Championships in Rome, Italy.

In February 2025, she placed fourth in the 400 metres at the Spanish Indoor Athletics Championships. She was a member of the Spanish 4 × 400 m relay team alongside Paula Sevilla, Eva Santidrián and Blanca Hervás which ran 3:25.68 at the European Indoor Championships on 9 March 2025 in Apeldoorn, Netherlands, to set a new Spanish indoor national record. At the same championships, she was part of the mixed 4 x 400 metres team alongside Manuel Guijarro, Carmen Avilés, and Bernat Erta which set a Spanish mixed indoor national record of 3:17.12 on 6 March 2025.

In May 2025, she competed for Spain at the 2025 World Athletics Relays as the team won the gold medal in the Women's 4 × 400 metres relay. She competed for Spain in the 400 metres hurdles at the 2025 European Athletics Team Championships First Division in Madrid on 28 June 2025. She competed at the 2025 World Athletics Championships in Tokyo, Japan, running 56.88 seconds without qualifying for the semi-finals.

In March 2026, she was selected for the Spanish relay team for the 2026 World Athletics Indoor Championships in Poland, winning a bronze medal with the women’s 4 x 400 metres relay team.
