= 2025 European Athletics Indoor Championships – Women's 4 × 400 metres relay =

Women's 4 × 400 metres relay at the 2025 European Athletics Indoor Championships
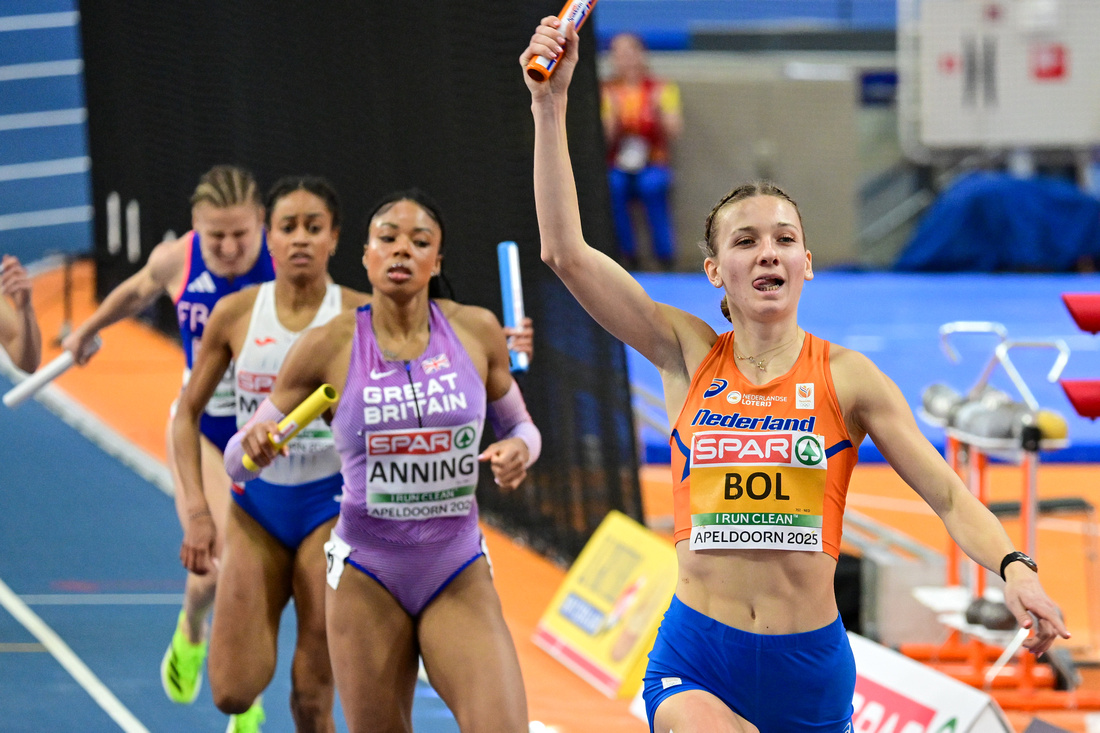
- Femke Bol, Amber Anning, Lurdes Gloria Manuel, and Amandine Brossier (from right to left) at the finish line
- Venue: Omnisport Apeldoorn
- Location: Apeldoorn, Netherlands
- Dates: 9 March 2025 (final)
- Teams: 6 national teams
- Winning time: 3:24.34 min CR NR

Medalists
gold medal	Lieke Klaver; Nina Franke; Cathelijn Peeters; Femke Bol	Netherlands
silver medal	Lina Nielsen; Hannah Kelly; Emily Newnham; Amber Anning	Great Britain
bronze medal	Lada Vondrová; Nikoleta Jíchová; Tereza Petržilková; Lurdes Gloria Manuel	Czech Republic

The women's 4 × 400 metres relay at the 2025 European Athletics Indoor Championships was held at the short track of Omnisport in Apeldoorn, Netherlands, on 9 March 2025. It was the thirteenth time the event was contested at the European Athletics Indoor Championships. Six nations were allocated a place to compete in the event.

The race was won by the team of the Netherlands in a championship record and Dutch record of 3:24.34 minutes, followed by the team of Great Britain and Northern Ireland with a British record of 3:24.89 minutes and the team of the Czech Republic with a Czech record of 3:25.31 minutes. Outside the medals, the teams of Spain and France also set national records of 3:25.68 min and 3:25.80 min respectively. The team of the Netherlands was briefly disqualified for obstruction during the handover between third and fourth runners, but they successfully appealed the decision, which was then reversed.

== Background ==
In an indoor women's 4 × 400 metres relay race, four female athletes forming one team successively run two laps on a 200-metre track and pass on a baton between them. The event had been contested twelve times before 2025, at every edition of the European Athletics Indoor Championships since 2000. The 2025 European Athletics Indoor Championships was held at the indoor arena of Omnisport Apeldoorn in Apeldoorn, Netherlands. The removable 200-metre track was retopped for these championships in September 2024.

At the start of the 2025 championships, Russia was the world and European record holder in the event, with a time of 3:23.37 min, set in 2006. The championship record was held by the Netherlands, with a time of 3:25.66 min, set at the 2023 championships, making the defending champions. Cique Elite Track Club's relay team of the United States had set a world leading performance of 3:25.73 min on 15 February 2025.

Records before the 2025 European Athletics Indoor Championships
Record	Team	Time	Location	Date
World record	Russia	3:23.37	Glasgow, Great Britain	28 January 2006
European record	Russia	3:23.37	Glasgow, Great Britain	28 January 2006
Championship record	Netherlands	3:25.66	Istanbul, Turkey	5 March 2023
World leading	(United States) Cique Elite Track Club	3:25.73	Clemson, South Carolina, United States	15 February 2025
European leading	N/A (Note: No European teams had run under 3:30.00 min before the European Athletics Championships in 2025.)			

== Qualification ==
Six teams could compete in the women's 4 × 400 metres relay. The Dutch team was given a place because the Netherlands was the host country. Three places were given to the highest ranking national teams based on their 4 × 400 metres relay results from the 2024 outdoor season. Two places were given to the fastest national teams based on the combined 400 metres results of the individual team members in the period from the 2024 indoor season until 24 February 2025.

== Final ==
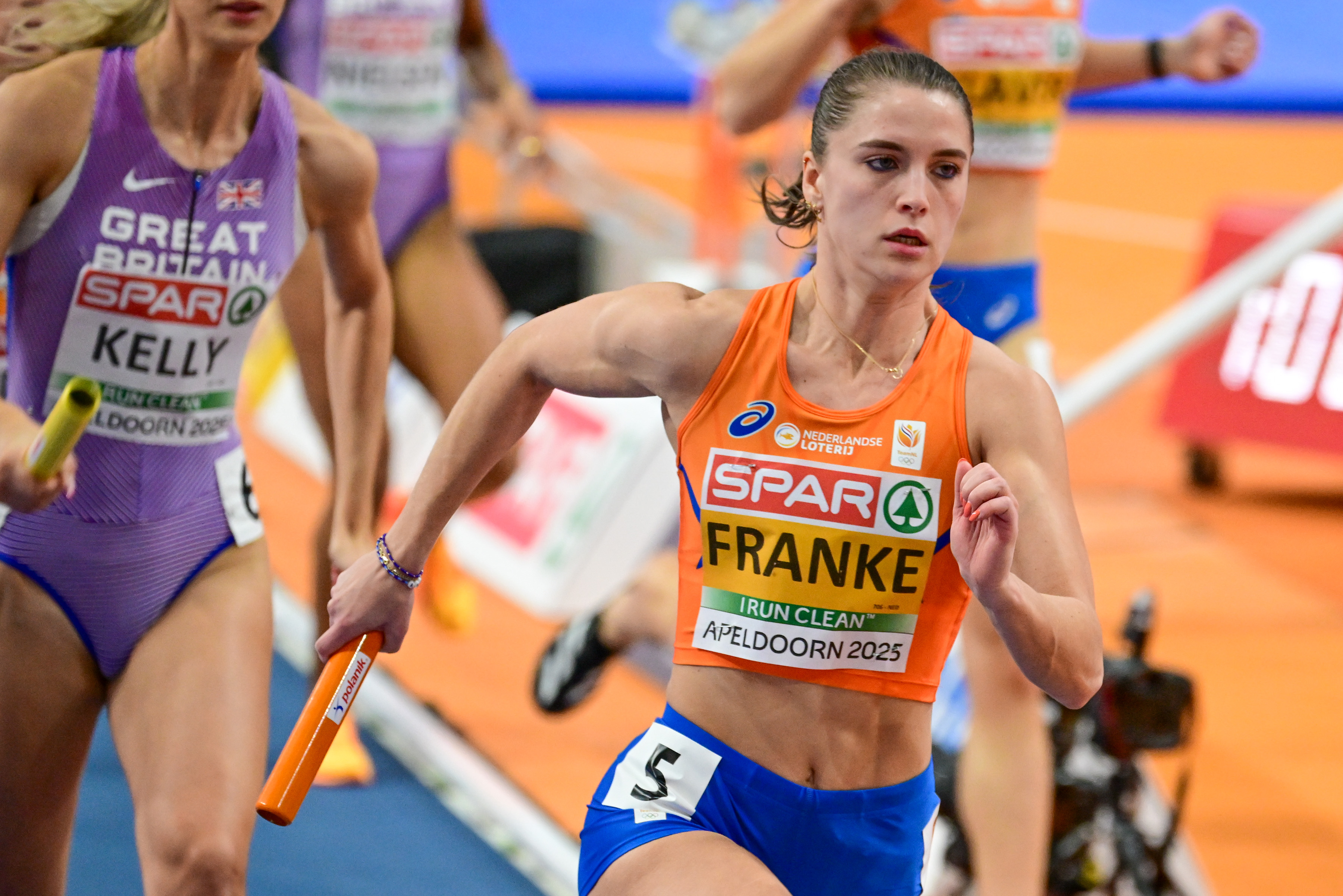
Nina Franke of the Netherlands being chased by Hannah Kelly of Great Britain and Northern Ireland at the start of the second leg

Six national teams competed in the final on 9 March at 18:50 (UTC+1) in the evening. Dutch king Willem-Alexander, Apeldoorn mayor Ton Heerts, and tournament director Dafne Schippers were in the audience.

At the end of the first leg, individual 400-metres winner Lieke Klaver of the Netherlands was the first to hand over the baton, followed by Lina Nielsen of Great Britain and Northern Ireland and individual bronze medalist Paula Sevilla of Spain. During the second leg, international debutante Nina Franke of the Netherlands, Hannah Kelly of Great Britain and Northern Ireland, and Eva Santidrián of Spain maintained the running order. The third leg runners Cathelijn Peeters of the Netherlands, Emily Newnham of Great Britain and Northern Ireland, and Daniela Fra of Spain didn't change the country positions either. At the handover between the third and fourth leg runners, Peeters gave the baton to Femke Bol of the Netherlands, the world record holder in the individual 400 metres short track. Peeters then passed in front of Amber Anning of Great Britain and Northern Ireland because of the order in which the fourth leg runners were positioned by officials, and Anning was subsequently passed by Blanca Hervás of Spain. Hervás was again passed by Anning within the next 100 metres and she was also passed by Lurdes Gloria Manuel of the Czech Republic before the 200-metre point. At that time, Bol and Anning were running shoulder to shoulder, but Bol pulled away in the last 100 metres.

The race was won by the team of the Netherlands in a world leading time (WL) of 3:24.34 min, breaking their championship record (CR) and national record (NR), and winning their third consecutive title. They were followed by the team of Great Britain and Northern Ireland in second place in a national record (NR) of 3:24.89 min and the team of the Czech Republic in third place in a national record (NR) of 3:25.31 min. Outside the medals, the teams of France and Spain also set national records of 3:25.68 min and 3:25.80 min respectively. Half an hour later, the team of the Netherlands was briefly disqualified for obstruction at the handover between third and fourth leg runners, but the disqualification was appealed and reversed.

For the Dutch newspaper NRC Handelsblad, Sam de Voogt reported that the final "remained exciting for a long time, when Bol went into the last bend next to the British anchor runner. But then Bol, the fastest woman in the 400 metres indoors ever, pushed on and the gap grew bigger with every stride. At the finish line, the difference was more than half a second – and the cheers deafening." Afterwards, Bol said about running as favourites and other victories by Dutch athletes earlier that day: "We're all going to set up our best race, keep running smart when we need to. And then we run so well and have such a fast time. First we see the men win, we see Samuel, we see Jessica win, so that gives such a boost, it's so great." Anning said in an interview about the race: "I was a lot closer than I thought. I did my best – it's tough when you're up against Femke, but I'm proud of these girls and all the other girls who helped us get here." Manuel said in an interview: "Great drama. It went so fast, that I don't even remember much from the race. But we are third and I think that's the best part."

Results of the final
Rank	Lane	Nation	Athletes	Time	Note
1st place, gold medalist(s)	5	Netherlands	Lieke Klaver, Nina Franke, Cathelijn Peeters, Femke Bol	3:24.34	CR, WL, NR
2nd place, silver medalist(s)	6	(United Kingdom) Great Britain & N.I.	Lina Nielsen, Hannah Kelly, Emily Newnham, Amber Anning	3:24.89	NR
3rd place, bronze medalist(s)	2	Czech Republic	Lada Vondrová, Nikoleta Jíchová, Tereza Petržilková, Lurdes Gloria Manuel	3:25.31	NR
4	3	Spain	Paula Sevilla, Eva Santidrián, Daniela Fra, Blanca Hervás	3:25.68	NR
5	4	France	Camille Seri, Louise Maraval, Marjorie Veyssiere, Amandine Brossier	3:25.80	NR
6	1	Ireland	Rachel McCann, Lauren Cadden, Arlene Crossan, Cliodhna Manning	3:32.72	SB
