= 2025 World Athletics Relays – Women's 4 × 400 metres relay =

Women's 4 × 400 metres relay at the 2025 World Athletics Relays
- Venue: Tianhe Stadium, Guangzhou
- Dates: 10 May (heats); 11 May (repechage round & final)
- Winning time: 3:24.13 NR

Medalists
gold medal	Paula Sevilla; Eva Santidrián; Daniela Fra; Blanca Hervás	Spain
silver medal	Paris Peoples; Karimah Davis; Maya Singletary; Bailey Lear	United States
bronze medal	Shirley Nekhubui; Miranda Coetzee; Precious Molepo; Zeney van der Walt; Hannah van Niekerk*	South Africa

The women's 4 × 400 metres relay at the 2025 World Athletics Relays was held at the Tianhe Stadium in Guangzhou, China on 10 and 11 May.

The event served as a qualifying event for the 2025 World Athletics Championships, with the top 14 teams securing qualification to the World Championships.

== Records ==
Prior to the competition, the records were as follows:

Record	Team	Time	Location	Date
World record	Soviet Union (Tatyana Ledovskaya, Olga Nazarova, Mariya Pinigina, Olga Bryzgina)	3:15.17	Seoul, South Korea	1 October 1988
Championships record	United States (Phyllis Francis, Natasha Hastings, Sanya Richards-Ross, Francena McCorory)	3:19.39	(The Bahamas) Nassau, Bahamas	3 May 2015
2025 World Leading	(United States) Captain Athletics	3:23.24	Gainesville, United States	19 April 2025

== Qualification ==
On 10 November 2024, World Athletics announced the qualification system for the championships. The top 16 teams in each event at the 2024 Summer Olympic Games qualify for entry to the championships. The host country China will enter with one team in each event, regardless of any entry conditions. The remaining teams (up to 32 in total per event) will be determined through the top lists in the qualification period (1 January 2024 to 13 April 2025).

== Program ==
All times are local (UTC+8).

Date	Time	Round
10 May 2025	20:53	Heats
11 May 2025	19:34	Repechage round
11 May 2025	21:49	Final

== Results ==
=== Heats (World Championships Qualifying Round 1) ===
The heats were held on 10 May 2025, starting at 20:53 (UTC+8) in the evening. Qualification: First 2 of each heat (WQ) plus 2 fastest times (Wq) qualify to the 2025 World Athletics Championships and World Athletics Relays Final.

==== Heat 1 ====
Rank	Lane	Nation	Competitors	Time	Notes
1	7	United States	Maya Singletary, Karimah Davis, Paris Peoples, Bailey Lear	3:26.05	WQ
2	8	France	Fanny Peltier, Diana Iscaye, Emma Montoya, Louise Maraval	3:26.46	WQ
3	6	Norway	Josefine Tomine Eriksen, Amalie Iuel, Elisabeth Slettum, Henriette Jæger	3:26.61	Wq, SB
4	5	Canada	Jasneet Nijjar, Zoe Sherar, Lauren Gale, Madeline Price	3:27.28	Wq, SB
5	9	Australia	Jemma Pollard, Carla Bull, Amelia Rowe, Laura McShane	3:31.78	
6	3	China	Kong Yingying, Li Fengdan, Huang Shiyao, Lian Zhi	3:36.83	SB
7	4	Zambia	Niddy Mingilishi, Rhoda Njobvu, Christabel Kunda, Abygirl Sepiso	3:37.98	SB

==== Heat 2 ====
Rank	Lane	Nation	Competitors	Time	Notes
1	7	Spain	Paula Sevilla, Eva Santidrián, Daniela Fra, Blanca Hervás	3:26.25	WQ
2	8	Italy	Ilaria Accame, Anna Polinari, Alessandra Bonora, Alice Mangione	3:27.03	WQ, SB
3	5	Great Britain	Victoria Ohuruogu, Hannah Kelly, Lina Nielsen, Laviai Nielsen	3:27.47	
4	6	Belgium	Naomi Van den Broeck, Ilana Hanssens, Liefde Schoemaker, Camille Laus	3:27.78	SB
5	9	Brazil	Anny de Bassi, Tiffani Marinho, Jainy Barreto, Letícia Lima	3:30.31	SB
6	3	Botswana	Batisane Kennekae, Obakeng Kamberuka, Galefele Moroko, Golekanye Kebonye Chikani	3:33.01	SB
7	4	Switzerland	Julia Niederberger, Karin Disch, Salome Hüsler, Aline Yuille	3:36.78	SB

==== Heat 3 ====
Rank	Lane	Nation	Competitors	Time	Notes
1	8	South Africa	Shirley Nekhubui, Hannah van Niekerk, Precious Molepo, Zenéy Geldenhuys	3:28.01	WQ, NR
2	4	Germany	Skadi Schier, Johanna Martin, Mona Mayer, Eileen Demes	3:28.63	WQ, SB
3	7	Ireland	Sophie Becker, Lauren Cadden, Rachel McCann, Phil Healy	3:30.06	SB
4	9	Kenya	Esther Mbagari, Mercy Chebet, Vanice Kerubo Nyagisera, Mercy Oketch	3:31.67	
5	5	Poland	Alicja Wrona-Kutrzepa, Weronika Bartnowska, Anna Pałys, Aleksandra Formella	3:32.82	
6	6	Jamaica	Jodean Williams, Roneisha McGregor, Kelly-Ann Beckford, Ronda Whyte	3:40.52	

=== Repechage Round (World Championships Qualifying Round 2) ===
The repechage round were held on 11 May 2025, starting at 19:34 (UTC+8) in the evening. The repechage round consisted of all countries which did not qualify for the final. First 3 of each heat qualify to the 2025 World Athletics Championships (WQ)

==== Heat 1 ====
Rank	Lane	Nation	Competitors	Time	Notes
1	6	Great Britain	Laviai Nielsen, Emily Newnham, Lina Nielsen, Nicole Yeargin	3:24.46	WQ, SB
2	5	Belgium	Naomi Van den Broeck, Imke Vervaet, Camille Laus, Helena Ponette	3:24.52	WQ, SB
3	7	Poland	Alicja Wrona-Kutrzepa, Justyna Święty-Ersetic, Aleksandra Formella, Natalia Bukowiecka	3:24.56	WQ, SB
4	4	Brazil	Anny de Bassi, Tiffani Marinho, Jainy Barreto, Letícia Lima	3:29.86	SB
5	9	Botswana	Batisane Kennekae, Galefele Moroko, Thompang Besele, Golekanye Kebonye Chikani	3:34.62	
	8	Kenya	Esther Mbagari, Mercy Chebet, Lanoline Aoko, Mercy Oketch	DQ	TR.17.2.3

==== Heat 2 ====
Rank	Lane	Nation	Competitors	Time	Notes
1	7	Ireland	Sophie Becker, Rhasidat Adeleke, Rachel McCann, Sharlene Mawdsley	3:24.69	WQ, SB
2	6	Australia	Mia Gross, Ellie Beer, Jemma Pollard, Alanah Yukich	3:27.31	WQ, SB
3	5	Switzerland	Julia Niederberger, Salome Hüsler, Karin Disch, Annina Fahr	3:32.37	WQ, SB
4	4	China	Zhou Li, Huang Guifen, Liu Yutong, Lian Zhi	3:32.74	SB
5	9	Zambia	Niddy Mingilishi, Rhoda Njobvu, Abygirl Sepiso, Namatama Kalimbwe	3:36.79	SB
	8	Jamaica		DNS	

=== Final ===
The final was held on 11 May 2025, starting at 21:36 (UTC+8) in the evening.

Rank	Lane	Nation	Competitors	Time	Notes
1st place, gold medalist(s)	5	Spain	Paula Sevilla, Eva Santidrián, Daniela Fra, Blanca Hervás	3:24.13	NR
2nd place, silver medalist(s)	6	United States	Paris Peoples, Karimah Davis, Maya Singletary, Bailey Lear	3:24.72	
3rd place, bronze medalist(s)	8	South Africa	Shirley Nekhubui, Miranda Coetzee, Precious Molepo, Zenéy Geldenhuys	3:24.84	NR
4	3	Norway	Josefine Tomine Eriksen, Amalie Iuel, Elisabeth Slettum, Henriette Jæger	3:25.35	NR
5	4	Italy	Ilaria Accame, Anna Polinari, Alessandra Bonora, Rebecca Borga	3:26.40	SB
6	7	France	Emma Montoya, Diana Iscaye, Estelle Raffai, Alexe Deau	3:26.87	
7	2	Canada	Micha Powell, Lauren Gale, Madeline Price, Zoe Sherar	3:27.84	
8	9	Germany	Skadi Schier, Annkathrin Hoven, Mona Mayer, Jana Lakner	3:29.65	
