= 2024 Herculis =

- Dates: 12 July 2024
- Host city: Monaco
- Venue: Stade Louis II
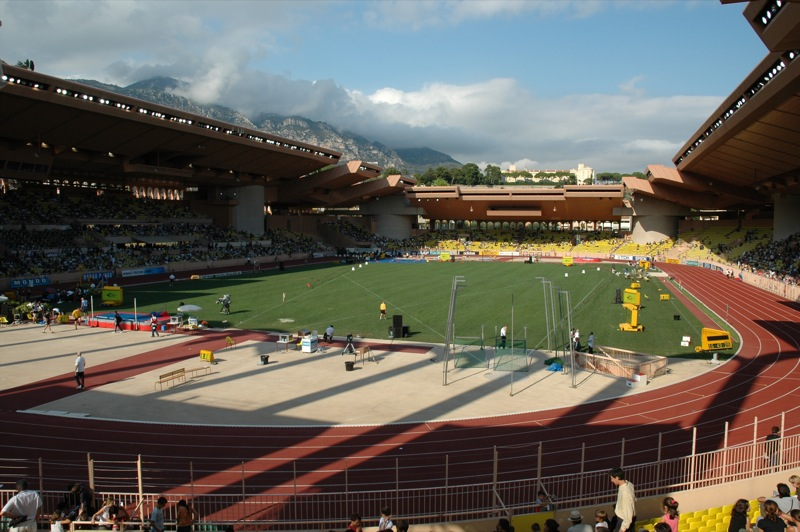
- Level: 2024 Diamond League

The 2024 Herculis was the 38th edition of the annual outdoor track and field meeting in Monaco. Held on 12 July at Stade Louis II, it was the ninth leg of the 2024 Diamond League – the highest level international track and field circuit.

== Highlights ==
At the meeting, Jessica Hull broke the 2000 metres world record, running 5:19.70.

Quincy Hall broke the 44 second barrier in the 400 metres for the first time, running 43.80.

Djamel Sedjati set a new Diamond League record in the 800 metres, running a personal best of 1:41.46.

Jakob Ingebrigtsen broke the 3:27 barrier in the 1500 metres for the first time, running 3:26.73.

== Results ==
Athletes competing in the Diamond League disciplines earned extra compensation and points which went towards qualifying for the 2024 Diamond League finals. First place earned 8 points, with each step down in place earning one less point than the previous, until no points are awarded in 9th place or lower. In the case of a tie, each tying athlete earns the full amount of points for the place.

=== Diamond Discipline ===
Men's 200 Metres (+0.6 m/s)
Place	Athlete	Age	Country	Time	Points
1st place, gold medalist(s)	Letsile Tebogo	21	Botswana	19.87	8
2nd place, silver medalist(s)	Alexander Ogando	24	Dominican Republic	20.02	7
3rd place, bronze medalist(s)	Tarsis Orogot	21	Uganda	20.32	6
4	Andrew Hudson	27	Jamaica	20.43	5
5	Filippo Tortu	26	Italy	20.43	4
6	Joshua Hartmann	25	Germany	20.54	3
7	Ryan Zeze	26	France	20.56	2
8	William Reais	25	Switzerland	20.99	1

Men's 400 Metres
Place	Athlete	Age	Country	Time	Points
1st place, gold medalist(s)	Quincy Hall	25	United States	43.80	8
2nd place, silver medalist(s)	Vernon Norwood	32	United States	44.34	7
3rd place, bronze medalist(s)	Lythe Pillay	21	South Africa	44.58	6
4	Busang Kebinatshipi	20	Botswana	44.67	5
5	Bayapo Ndori	25	Botswana	44.71	4
6	Christopher Morales Williams	19	Canada	45.11	3
7	Luca Sito	21	Italy	45.26	2
8	Téo Andant	24	France	45.89	1

Men's 800 Metres
Place	Athlete	Age	Country	Time	Points
1st place, gold medalist(s)	Djamel Sedjati	25	Algeria	1:41.46	8
2nd place, silver medalist(s)	Mohamed Attaoui	22	Spain	1:42.04	7
3rd place, bronze medalist(s)	Gabriel Tual	26	France	1:42.10	6
4	Aaron Cheminingwa	26	Kenya	1:42.13	5
5	Ben Pattison	22	Great Britain	1:42.27	4
6	Marco Arop	25	Canada	1:42.93	3
7	Andreas Kramer	27	Sweden	1:43.13	2
8	Eliott Crestan	25	Belgium	1:43.19	1
9	Catalin Tecuceanu	24	Italy	1:43.75	
10	Benjamin Robert	26	France	1:43.95	
	Ludovic Le Meur	26	France	DNF	

Men's 1500 Metres
Place	Athlete	Age	Country	Time	Points
1st place, gold medalist(s)	Jakob Ingebrigtsen	23	Norway	3:26.73	8
2nd place, silver medalist(s)	Timothy Cheruiyot	28	Kenya	3:28.71	7
3rd place, bronze medalist(s)	Brian Komen	25	Kenya	3:28.80	6
4	Yared Nuguse	25	United States	3:29.13	5
5	Neil Gourley	29	Great Britain	3:30.65	4
6	Narve Gilje Nordås	25	Norway	3:31.06	3
7	Olli Hoare	27	Australia	3:31.07	2
8	Azeddine Habz	30	France	3:31.79	1
9	Vincent Ciattei	29	United States	3:32.04	
10	Maël Gouyette	25	France	3:33.29	
11	Isaac Nader	24	Portugal	3:34.42	
12	Pietro Arese	24	Italy	3:35.19	
13	Elliot Giles	30	Great Britain	3:40.72	
	Niels Laros	19	Netherlands	DNF	
	Žan Rudolf	31	Slovenia	DNF	
	Pieter Sisk	24	Belgium	DNF	

Men's 110 Metres Hurdles (+0.7 m/s)
Place	Athlete	Age	Country	Time	Points
1st place, gold medalist(s)	Grant Holloway	26	United States	13.01	8
2nd place, silver medalist(s)	Lorenzo Simonelli	22	Italy	13.08	7
3rd place, bronze medalist(s)	Cordell Tinch	23	United States	13.10	6
4	Trey Cunningham	25	United States	13.13	5
5	Sasha Zhoya	22	France	13.25	4
6	Jason Joseph	25	Switzerland	13.54	3
	Shunsuke Izumiya	24	Japan	DNF	

Men's 400 Metres Hurdles
Place	Athlete	Age	Country	Time	Points
1st place, gold medalist(s)	Rai Benjamin	26	United States	46.67	8
2nd place, silver medalist(s)	Karsten Warholm	28	Norway	46.73	7
3rd place, bronze medalist(s)	Alison dos Santos	24	Brazil	47.18	6
4	Malik James-King	25	Jamaica	47.73	5
5	Abderrahman Samba	28	Qatar	48.27	4
6	CJ Allen	29	United States	48.28	3
7	Wilfried Happio	25	France	48.37	2
8	Caleb Dean	23	United States	48.46	1

Men's High Jump
Place	Athlete	Age	Country	Mark	Points
1st place, gold medalist(s)	Hamish Kerr	27	New Zealand	2.33 m	8
2nd place, silver medalist(s)	Shelby McEwen	28	United States	2.31 m	7
3rd place, bronze medalist(s)	Stefano Sottile	26	Italy	2.28 m	6
3rd place, bronze medalist(s)	Woo Sang-hyeok	28	South Korea	2.28 m	6
5	Yual Reath	24	Australia	2.25 m	4
6	JuVaughn Harrison	25	United States	2.21 m	3
7	Thomas Carmoy	24	Belgium	2.16 m	2
7	Jan Štefela	23	Czech Republic	2.16 m	2

Women's 100 Metres (+1.0 m/s)
Place	Athlete	Age	Country	Time	Points
1st place, gold medalist(s)	Julien Alfred	23	Saint Lucia	10.85	8
2nd place, silver medalist(s)	Tamari Davis	21	United States	10.99	7
3rd place, bronze medalist(s)	Dina Asher-Smith	28	Great Britain	10.99	6
4	Patrizia van der Weken	24	Luxembourg	11.02	5
5	Marie Josée Ta Lou-Smith	35	Ivory Coast	11.08	4
6	Zoe Hobbs	26	New Zealand	11.15	3
7	Tamara Clark	25	United States	11.25	2
8	Aleia Hobbs	28	United States	11.26	1

Women's 400 Metres
Place	Athlete	Age	Country	Time	Points
1st place, gold medalist(s)	Rhasidat Adeleke	21	Ireland	49.17	8
2nd place, silver medalist(s)	Lieke Klaver	25	Netherlands	49.64	7
3rd place, bronze medalist(s)	Kendall Ellis	28	United States	50.39	6
4	Amandine Brossier	28	France	50.43	5
5	Lurdes Gloria Manuel	19	Czech Republic	50.72	4
6	Emma Montoya	25	France	51.76	3
7	Shana Grebo	23	France	52.02	2

Women's 2000 Metres
Place	Athlete	Age	Country	Time	Points
1st place, gold medalist(s)	Jessica Hull	27	Australia	5:19.70	8
2nd place, silver medalist(s)	Melissa Courtney-Bryant	30	Great Britain	5:26.08	7
3rd place, bronze medalist(s)	Edinah Jebitok	22	Kenya	5:26.09	6
4	Cory McGee	32	United States	5:28.78	5
5	Georgia Griffith	27	Australia	5:28.82	4
6	Lucia Stafford	25	Canada	5:31.18	3
7	Agathe Guillemot	25	France	5:32.63	2
8	Marta García	26	Spain	5:32.86	1
9	Axumawit Embaye	29	Ethiopia	5:34.99	
10	Ciara Mageean	32	Ireland	5:43.06	
11	María Pía Fernández	29	Uruguay	5:50.21	
	Esther Guerrero	34	Spain	DNF	
	Heather MacLean	28	United States	DNF	
	Lorena Martín	27	Spain	DNF	

Women's 5000 Metres
Place	Athlete	Age	Country	Time	Points
1st place, gold medalist(s)	Margaret Akidor	22	Kenya	14:39.49	8
2nd place, silver medalist(s)	Likina Amebaw	26	Ethiopia	14:40.44	7
3rd place, bronze medalist(s)	Nozomi Tanaka	24	Japan	14:40.86	6
4	Fantaye Belayneh	23	Ethiopia	14:40.89	5
5	Nadia Battocletti	24	Italy	14:41.06	4
6	Melknat Wudu	19	Ethiopia	14:43.48	3
7	Marta Alemayo	16	Ethiopia	14:43.84	2
8	Senayet Getachew	18	Ethiopia	14:44.20	1
9	Weini Kelati	27	United States	14:44.91	
10	Mekedes Alemeshete	18	Ethiopia	14:50.54	
11	Lilian Kasait Rengeruk	27	Kenya	14:55.97	
12	Caroline Nyaga	30	Kenya	15:03.15	
13	Lauren Ryan	26	Australia	15:22.03	
14	Hannah Nuttall	27	Great Britain	15:37.21	
	Dani Jones	27	United States	DNF	
	Maureen Koster	32	Netherlands	DNF	
	Katie Snowden	30	Great Britain	DNF	

Women's Pole Vault
Place	Athlete	Age	Country	Mark	Points
1st place, gold medalist(s)	Nina Kennedy	27	Australia	4.88 m	8
2nd place, silver medalist(s)	Angelica Moser	26	Switzerland	4.88 m	7
3rd place, bronze medalist(s)	Molly Caudery	24	Great Britain	4.83 m	6
4	Alysha Newman	30	Canada	4.76 m	5
5	Roberta Bruni	30	Italy	4.66 m	4
5	Katie Moon	33	United States	4.66 m	4
7	Emily Grove	31	United States	4.56 m	2
8	Amálie Švábíková	24	Czech Republic	4.56 m	1
9	Marie-Julie Bonnin	22	France	4.46 m	
9	Gabriela Leon	25	United States	4.46 m	

Women's Triple Jump
Place	Athlete	Age	Country	Mark	Points
1st place, gold medalist(s)	Leyanis Pérez	22	Cuba	14.96 m (+1.7 m/s)	8
2nd place, silver medalist(s)	Thea LaFond	30	Dominica	14.87 m (+1.3 m/s)	7
3rd place, bronze medalist(s)	Maryna Bekh-Romanchuk	28	Ukraine	14.81 m (+2.0 m/s)	6
4	Shanieka Ricketts	32	Jamaica	14.67 m (+1.3 m/s)	5
5	Ackelia Smith	22	Jamaica	14.30 m (+1.3 m/s)	4
6	Liadagmis Povea	28	Cuba	14.27 m (+1.8 m/s)	3
7	Neja Filipič	29	Slovenia	14.26 m (+1.9 m/s)	2
8	Ana Peleteiro	28	Spain	14.21 m (+1.0 m/s)	1
9	Ilionis Guillaume	26	France	13.84 m (+1.3 m/s)	

Women's Javelin Throw
Place	Athlete	Age	Country	Mark	Points
1st place, gold medalist(s)	Haruka Kitaguchi	26	Japan	65.21 m	8
2nd place, silver medalist(s)	Mackenzie Little	27	Australia	64.74 m	7
3rd place, bronze medalist(s)	Anete Sietiņa	28	Latvia	59.58 m	6
4	Victoria Hudson	28	Austria	59.35 m	5
5	Adriana Vilagoš	20	Serbia	58.04 m	4
6	Tori Peeters	30	New Zealand	55.80 m	3
7	Auriana Lazraq-Khlass	25	France	43.14 m	2

=== National events ===
Men's 1000 Metres
Place	Athlete	Age	Country	Time
1st place, gold medalist(s)	Clement Paillon	28	France	2:22.01
2nd place, silver medalist(s)	Manuel Zanini	17	Italy	2:22.60
3rd place, bronze medalist(s)	Alexandre le Paih	31	France	2:22.76
4	James Ford	18	New Zealand	2:23.48
5	Anthony Crapanne	31	France	2:24.50
6	David Proctor	38	Great Britain	2:26.55
7	Gabriele Ferrara	15–16	Italy	2:26.95
8	Ithocor Meloni	23	Italy	2:27.07
9	Mathis Avrillon	20	France	2:27.67
10	Robert Fülle	22	Germany	2:27.75
11	Pierre Berri	23–24	France	2:28.03
12	Maxens Monin	23	France	2:28.69
13	Andrea Sigismondi	40	Italy	2:28.69
14	Vivien Majorel	33	France	2:29.13
15	Julien Langlais	25	France	2:29.99
	Emanuele Brugnizza	22	Italy	DNF

Women's 1000 Metres
Place	Athlete	Age	Country	Time
1st place, gold medalist(s)	Louise Morval	22	France	2:49.54
2nd place, silver medalist(s)	Elena Irbetti	16	Italy	2:52.23
3rd place, bronze medalist(s)	Lola Fromentoux	23	France	2:56.18
4	Martina Rosati	40	Italy	2:56.48
5	Alex Mundell	28	Great Britain	2:56.59
6	Nicole Edmunds	24–25	Great Britain	2:56.77
7	Nélie Clément	21	France	2:58.56
8	Tetiana Savluk-Lagoutte	35	France	2:59.45
9	Sabrina Passoni	29–30	Italy	3:00.79
10	Justine Brazy Lechien	37	France	3:01.32
11	Alessia Peduzzi	26	Italy	3:02.80
12	Francesca Premoli	21–22	Italy	3:03.94
13	Federica Pagliassotto	21	Italy	3:12.05

== See also ==
- 2024 Diamond League
