= Diana Iscaye =

French sprinter (born 1998)

Personal information
- Nationality: French
- Born: 18 May 1998 (age 28) Les Abymes, Guadeloupe
- Height: 167 cm (5 ft 6 in)
- Weight: 62 kg (137 lb)

Sport
- Country: France
- Sport: Athletics
- Event: Sprint
- Coached by: Alex Menal

Achievements and titles
- Personal bests: 400m: 52.21 (Angers, 2024)

Diana Iscaye (born 18 April 1998) is a French sprinter from Guadeloupe. She has competed for France internationally in 4 x 400 metres relay races.

== Career ==
Originally from Guadeloupe, she won cross-country races whilst at school and her parents decided to enroll her in a running club. She arrived on mainland France in 2018 to pursue a career in athletics. From 2018, she be fab training in Fontainebleau as a member of Pays de Fontainebleau Athlé sud 77 club. She was selected for the French relay pool for the 2019 World Athletics Championships in Doha. That year, at the 2019 French Athletics Championship, she lowered her personal best by over two seconds. In 2020, she finished third at the French Athletics Championships over 400 metres and was included in the French team for the 2020 Olympic Games.

She was included in the French relay pool for the 2022 World Athletics Championships in Eugene, Oregon. She ran for France at the 2022 European Athletics Championships in Munich in the Women's 4 × 400 metres relay alongside Sokhna Lacoste, Marjorie Veyssiere, Amandine Brossier, where they placed fifth in their heat.

She ran alongside Estelle Raffai, Veyssiere, and Sounkamba Sylla at the 2024 World Athletics Relays in Nassau, Bahamas in the women’s 4 x 400 metres relay.

On 10 April 2025, she was named in the French team for the 2025 World Athletics Relays in Guangzhou, China in May 2025. She competed in the women's 4 x 400 metres relay as the French team finished second behind the United States in their heat to secure a place at the 2025 World Championships.

== Personal life ==
She has worked as a member of the French National Police.
