= Rachel McCann =

Rachel McCann may refer to:

- Rachel McCann (field hockey)
- Rachel McCann (sprinter)
