= Nina Franke =

Dutch sprinter

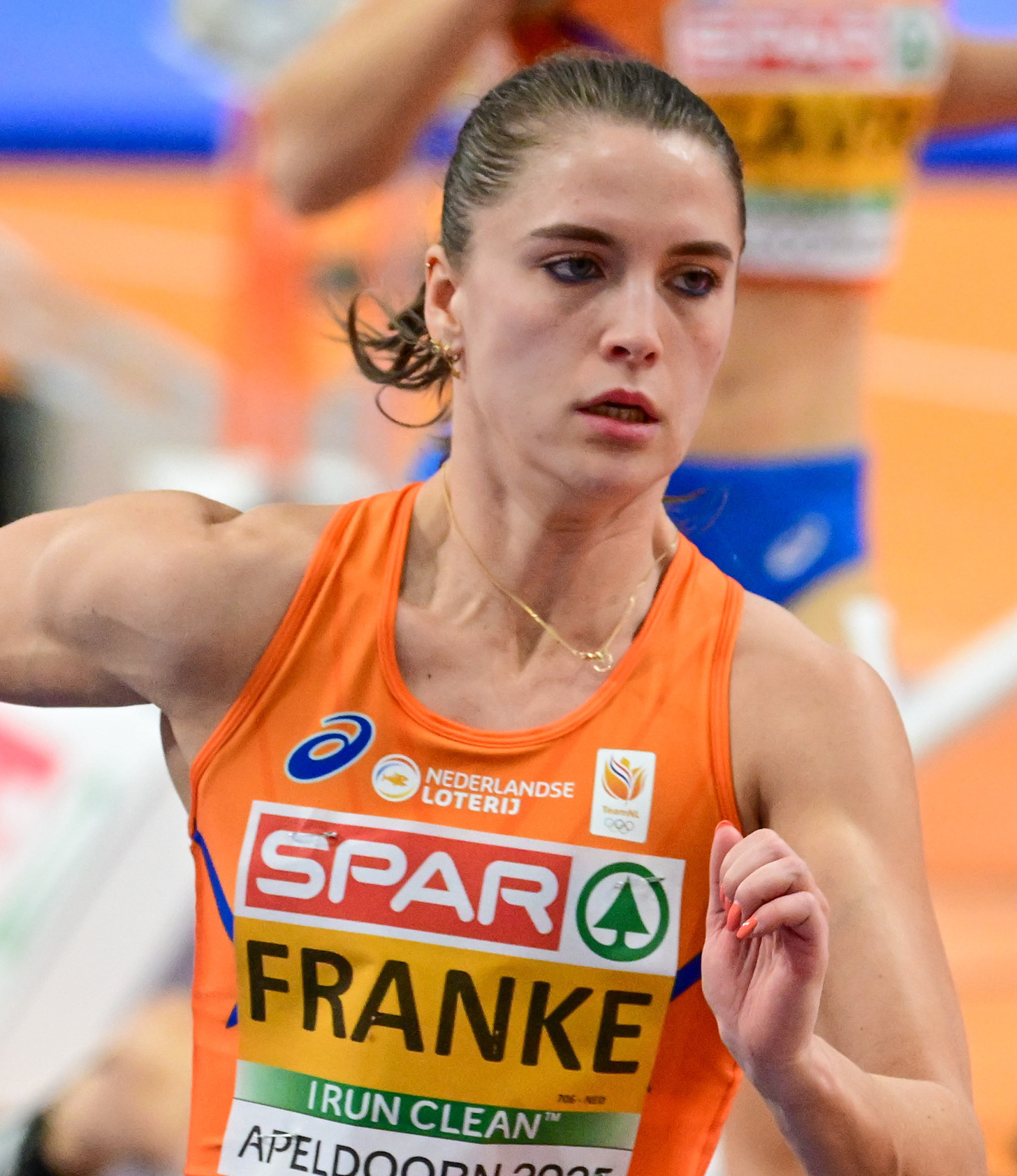
- Nina Franke at the 2025 European Indoor Championships in Apeldoorn, Netherlands

Personal information
- Nationality: Dutch
- Born: 14 March 2002 (age 24)

Sport
- Sport: Athletics
- Events: Sprint, Hurdles
Medal record
Women's athletics
Representing Netherlands
World Indoor Championships
Silver medal – second place	2026 Toruń	4 × 400 m relay
European Championships
Gold medal – first place	2026 Birmingham	4 × 400 m relay
European Indoor Championships
Gold medal – first place	2025 Apeldoorn	4 × 400 m relay

Nina Franke (born 14 March 2002) is a Dutch sprinter and hurdler. She was runner-up in the 400 metres hurdles at the Dutch Athletics Championships in 2024 and a gold medalist at the 2025 European Athletics Indoor Championships and a silver medalist at the 2026 World Indoor Championships in the women's 4 × 400 metres relay.

== Biography ==
She is from Heesch, North Brabant. She competes in both sprint and hurdles events. She finished second in the 400 metres hurdles at the Dutch Athletics Championships in Hengelo in June 2024.

She finished fourth at the Dutch Indoor Athletics Championships 400 metres race in February 2025 with a big personal record of 52.38 seconds. She had previously run a personal best of 52.85 seconds to qualify for the final. She was selected for the 2025 European Athletics Indoor Championships in Apeldoorn. She ran as part of the victorious Dutch women's 4 × 400 metres relay team alongside Lieke Klaver, Femke Bol and Cathelijn Peeters, although there the Netherlands were briefly disqualified for Peeters exchange block on British runner Amber Anning, they were reinstated on appeal.

In June 2025, she was part of the Dutch mixed 4 × 400 metres team which placed sixth at the 2025 European Athletics Team Championships First Division in Madrid, Spain. She was selected for the Dutch team for the 2025 World Athletics Championships in Tokyo, Japan.

Franke was selected for the relay pool for 2026 World Athletics Indoor Championships in Poland in March 2026, winning a silver medal in the women's 4 × 400 metres relay. In May, she competed with the Dutch squad at the 2026 World Athletics Relays in Gaborone, Botswana. That month, she placed third in the 400 metres hurdles at the European Champions Club Cup. In August 2026, she was a gold medalist at the 2026 European Athletics Championships in Birmingham, England, running in the preliminary round of the women's 4 × 400 metres relay.
