= Blanca Hervás =

Spanish athlete (born 2002)

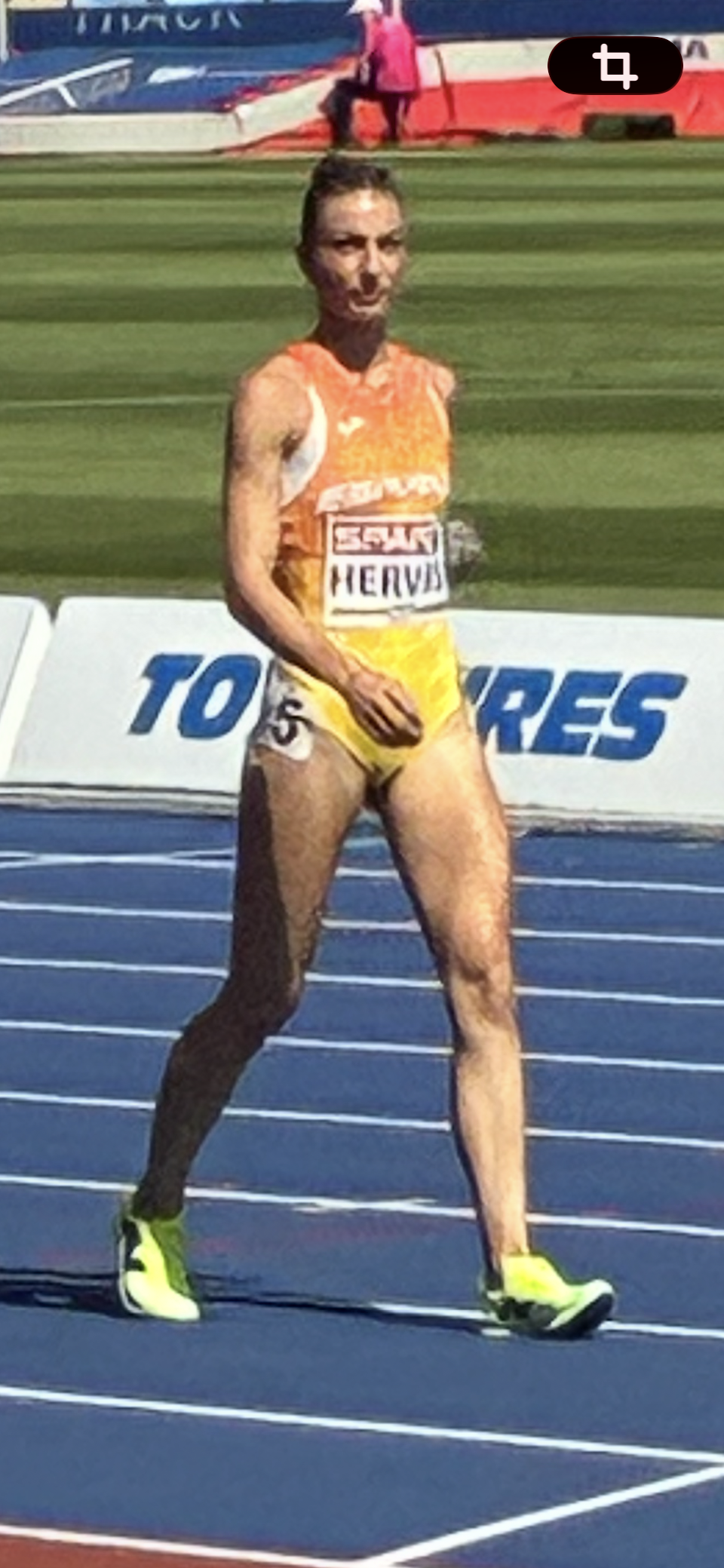
- Hervas in 2026

Personal information
- Full name: Blanca Hervás Rodríguez
- Nationality: Spanish
- Born: 30 September 2002 (age 24) Madrid, Spain

Sport
- Sport: Athletics
- Event: 400 metres

Achievements and titles
- Personal bests: 200 m: 23.17 (Salamanca, 2026); 400 m: 50.46 (Madrid, 2026)
Medal record
Women's athletics
Representing Spain
World Indoor Championships
Silver medal – second place	2026 Toruń	Mixed 4 × 400 m
Bronze medal – third place	2026 Toruń	4 × 400 m relay
World Relays
Gold medal – first place	2025 Guangzhou	4 × 400 m relay
Silver medal – second place	2026 Gaborone	4 × 400 m relay
European U23 Championships
Bronze medal – third place	2023 Espoo	4 × 400 m relay

Blanca Hervás Rodríguez (Note: In this Spanish name, the first or paternal surname is Hervás and the second or maternal family name is Rodríguez.) (born 30 September 2002) is a Spanish sprinter. She has competed for Spain at multiple major championships, including the 2024 Olympic Games. She won the 400 metres title at the 2026 Spanish Indoor Athletics Championships and won a silver medal at the 2026 World Athletics Indoor Championships in the mixed 4 × 400 metres relay.

== Biography ==
In July 2023, she was part of the Spanish 4 × 400 m relay team which won bronze at the 2023 European Athletics U23 Championships in Espoo, Finland.

Hervás was part of the Spanish 4 × 400 m relay team that qualified for the 2024 Paris Olympics at the 2024 World Relays in Nassau, Bahamas.

Hervás was selected for the 2024 European Athletics Championships in Rome in June 2024. Her Spanish 4 × 400 m relay team qualified for the final and placed seventh overall. The team of Hervás, Berta Segura, Carmen Avilés and Eva Santidrián, set a new Spanish national record time 3:25.25, more than two seconds lower than the previous national best.

Hervás ran a personal best time for the 400 metres of 51.68 seconds in Madrid on 21 June 2024. On 29 June 2024, she came second at the Spanish Athletics Championships over 400 metres in La Nucia. She competed in the women's 4 × 400 metres relay at the 2024 Paris Olympics.

She finished second to Paula Sevilla in the 400 metres at the Spanish Indoor Athletics Championships in February 2025. She ran the anchor leg for the Spanish women's 4 × 400 metres relay team which set a new national indoor record at the 2025 European Athletics Indoor Championships in Apeldoorn, Netherlands.

She ran for Spain at the 2025 World Athletics Relays with her performances including winning a gold medal in the women's 4 × 400 metres relay. Competing at the 2025 European Athletics Team Championships First Division in Madrid, she was a member of the Spanish mixed 4x400 metres relay team which set a new national record of 2.20.4. Having missed out on qualification for the individual 400 metres by five-tenths of a second, Hervas was selected for the Spanish team for the 2025 World Athletics Championships in Tokyo, Japan, where she ran in the women's x 400 metres relay.

Hervás won the 400 metres at the 2026 Spanish Indoor Championships in Valencia, running 51.49 seconds. She was selected for the 2026 World Athletics Indoor Championships in Poland in March 2026, where she won a silver medal in the mixed 4 × 400 metres relay. At the same championships, she also ran an indoor personal best 51.43 seconds to place sixth in the final of the 400 metres, and won the bronze medal with the women's 4 × 400 m relay team.

Competing at the 2026 World Athletics Relays in Botswana, she was part of the Spanish mixed 4 x 400 metres relay team which set a national record of 3:09.89 on the opening day. Later that day she helped the women's 4 x 400 m relay team also qualify for the final. The following day, she ran as the Spanish quartet achieved a 3:21.25 national record to win the silver medal in the women’s 4 x 400m final. Competing at the 2026 European Athletics Championships in Birmingham, England, in August, she was a semi-finalist in the 400 metres. She also competed in the women's 4 × 400 metres relay at the championships as Spain placed fourth.

== International competitions ==
Year	Competition	Venue	Position	Event	Notes
Representing Spain
2022	Mediterranean Games	Oran, Algeria	6th	400 m	54.23
2023	European U23 Championships	Espoo, Finland	3rd	4 × 400 m relay	3:31.11
2024	World Relays	Nassau, Bahamas	2nd (r)	4 × 400 m relay	3:27.30
2024	World Relays	Nassau, Bahamas	13th (h)	Mixed 4 × 400 m relay	3:15.47
2024	European Championships	Rome, Italy	7th	4 × 400 m relay	3:26.94
2024	Olympic Games	Paris, France	12th (h)	4 × 400 m relay	3:28.29
2025	European Indoor Championships	Apeldoorn, Netherlands	14th (h)	400 m i	52.32
2025	European Indoor Championships	Apeldoorn, Netherlands	4th	4 × 400 m relay i	3:25.68
2025	World Relays	Guangzhou, China	1st	4 × 400 m relay	3:24.13
2025	World Championships	Tokyo, Japan	9th (h)	4 × 400 m relay	3:24.76
2025	World Championships	Tokyo, Japan	9th (h)	Mixed 4 × 400 m relay	3:12.57
2026	World Indoor Championships	Toruń, Poland	6th	400 m	51.43
2026	World Indoor Championships	Toruń, Poland	3rd	4 × 400 m relay	3:26.04
2026	World Relays	Gaborone, Botswana	2nd	4 × 400 m relay	3:21.25
2026	European Championships	Birmingham, United Kingdom	14th (sf)	400 m	51.12
2026	European Championships	Birmingham, United Kingdom	4th	4 × 400 m relay	3:24.39

== Personal life ==
From Valdemarín in Madrid, Hervas trained in Majadahonda in the city from the age of eight years-old. She studied Communication at the University of Miami in the United States. After returning to Spain she reunited with her coach Julio Rifaterra. She worked a part-time job as a Product Manager before becoming a professional athlete in 2025.
