= 2025 European Athletics Indoor Championships – Women's 400 metres =

Women's 400 metres at the 2025 European Athletics Indoor Championships
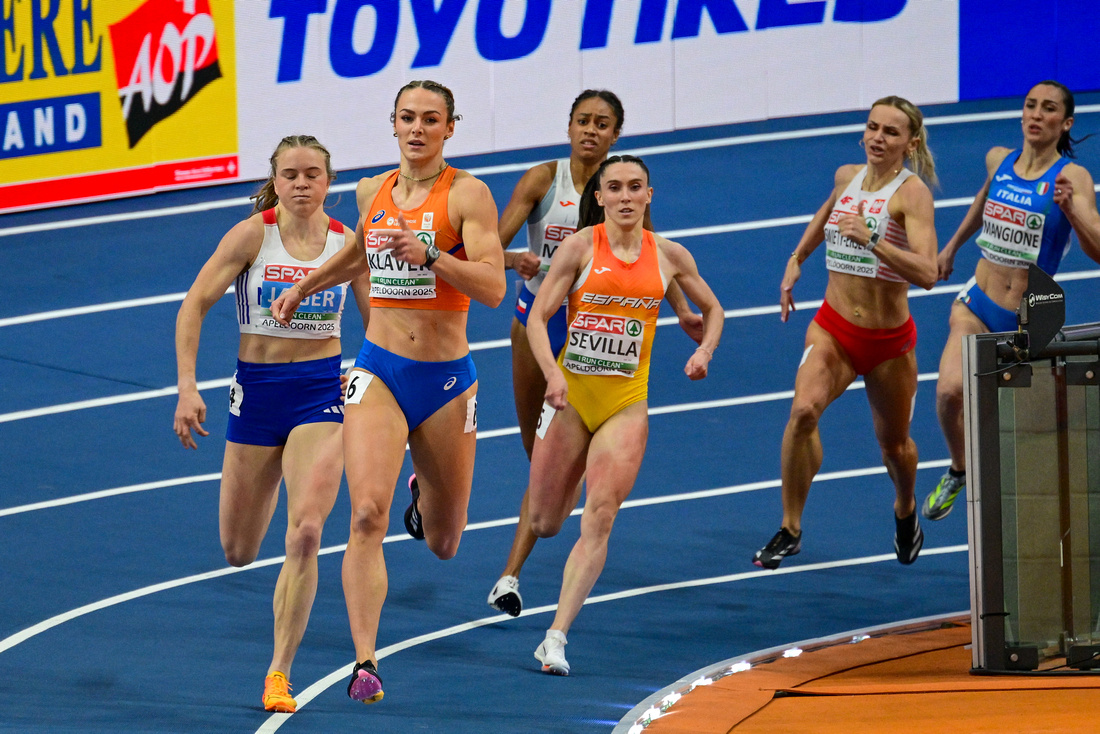
- Medalists Lieke Klaver (center), Henriette Jæger (left), and Paula Sevilla in front of the three other runners during the final
- Venue: Omnisport Apeldoorn
- Location: Apeldoorn, Netherlands
- Dates: 7 March 2025 (round 1 and semi-finals); 8 March 2025 (final)
- Competitors: 28 from 15 nations
- Winning time: 50.38 s

Medalists
| gold medal | Lieke Klaver | Netherlands |
| silver medal | Henriette Jæger | Norway |
| bronze medal | Paula Sevilla | Spain |

The women's 400 metres at the 2025 European Athletics Indoor Championships was held on the 200-metres track of Omnisport in Apeldoorn, Netherlands, on 7 and 8 March 2025. It was the 38th time the event was contested at the European Athletics Indoor Championships. Athletes could qualify by achieving the entry standard or by their World Athletics Ranking in the event.

Twenty-eight athletes from fifteen nations competed in the first round during the morning session on 7 March. Mette Baas of Finland set a Finnish record of 52.25 seconds. Amber Anning of Great Britain and Northern Ireland, Nikoleta Jíchová of the Czech Republic, and Tetiana Melnyk of Ukraine were disqualified for lane infringement. Twelve athletes from nine nations competed in the semi-finals during the evening session on 7 March.

Six athletes from six different nations competed in the final during the evening session on 8 March. The race was won by Lieke Klaver of the Netherlands in 50.38 seconds, followed by Henriette Jæger of Norway in 50.45 seconds and Paula Sevilla of Spain in 50.99 seconds equalling the Spanish record.

== Background ==
The women's 400 metres was contested 37 times before 2025, at every previous edition of the European Athletics Indoor Championships (1970–2023). The 2025 European Athletics Indoor Championships was held in Omnisport Apeldoorn in Apeldoorn, Netherlands. The removable 200-metres track received a new top layer for these championships in September 2024.

Femke Bol of the Netherlands was the world and European record holder with a time of 49.17 s set in 2024. Bol is also the 2021 and 2023 champion in this event. She did not defend these titles in 2025 as she did not compete in individual events during the 2025 indoor season, only in relays. The championship record of 49.59 s was set by Jarmila Kratochvílová of Czechoslovakia in 1982.

On 1 March 2025, Aaliyah Butler of the United States set her world leading performance of 49.78 s. On 16 February 2025, Henriette Jæger of Norway set her European leading performance of 50.44 s, preceded by the next-fastest Europeans Amber Anning of Great Britain and Northern Ireland in 50.57 s on 14 February 2025 and Lieke Klaver of the Netherlands in 50.76 s on 13 February 2025.

Records before the 2025 European Athletics Indoor Championships
| Record | Athlete (nation) | Time | Location | Date | Ref. |
|---|---|---|---|---|---|
| World record | Femke Bol (NED) | 49.17 | Glasgow, United Kingdom | 2 March 2024 | |
| European record | Femke Bol (NED) | 49.17 | Glasgow, United Kingdom | 2 March 2024 | |
| Championship record | Jarmila Kratochvílová (TCH) | 49.59 | Milan, Italy | 7 March 1982 | |
| World leading | Aaliyah Butler (USA) | 49.78 | College Station, Texas, United States | 1 March 2025 | |
| European leading | Henriette Jæger (NOR) | 50.44 | Toruń, Poland | 16 February 2025 | |

== Qualification ==
For the women's 400 metres, the qualification period was from 25 February 2024 until 23 February 2025. Athletes could qualify by achieving the entry standards of 52.10 s indoors or 50.70 s outdoor or by virtue of their World Athletics Ranking for the event. There was a target number of thirty athletes with a maximum of four athletes per nation that could be entered, of whom three athletes per nation could eventually participate. On 27 February 2025, a final entry list with thirty-four athletes was published.

== Rounds ==
=== Round 1 ===
Round 1 was held on 7 March, starting at 11:55 (UTC+1) in the morning. Twenty-eight athletes from fifteen nations competed in five heats (preliminary rounds). The first two athletes in each heat (Q) and the next two fastest athletes overall (q) qualified for the semi-finals. In the first heat, Mette Baas of Finland set a national record (NR) of 52.25 s and Amber Anning of Great Britain and Northern Ireland was disqualified (DQ) for violating the technical rule for lane infringement (TR17.2.3), which occurs when a runner steps over the line of the assigned lane once or steps on the line of the assigned lane multiple times. In the third and fourth heat, Tetiana Melnyk of Ukraine and Nikoleta Jíchová of the Czech Republic were also disqualified for lane infringement.

Results of round 1
| Rank | Heat | Athlete | Nation | Time | Notes |
|---|---|---|---|---|---|
| 1 | 3 | Lurdes Gloria Manuel | Czech Republic | 51.52 | Q |
| 2 | 2 | Lieke Klaver | Netherlands | 51.52 | Q |
| 3 | 4 | Paula Sevilla | Spain | 51.75 | Q |
| 4 | 2 | Eva Santidrián | Spain | 51.81 | Q |
| 5 | 1 | Lada Vondrová | Czech Republic | 51.91 | Q |
| 6 | 2 | Imke Vervaet | Belgium | 51.94 | q, PB |
| 7 | 4 | Justyna Święty-Ersetic | Poland | 51.98 | Q |
| 8 | 3 | Amandine Brossier | France | 52.00 | Q, SB |
| 9 | 5 | Henriette Jæger | Norway | 52.04 | Q |
| 10 | 4 | Ama Pipi | (United Kingdom) Great Britain & N.I. | 52.18 | q |
| 11 | 1 | Alice Mangione | Italy | 52.20 | Q |
| 12 | 1 | Mette Baas | Finland | 52.25 | NR |
| 13 | 3 | Helena Ponette | Belgium | 52.32 | |
| 14 | 3 | Blanca Hervas | Spain | 52.32 | |
| 15 | 5 | Cathelijn Peeters | Netherlands | 52.38 | Q |
| 16 | 5 | Alessandra Bonora | Italy | 52.40 | PB |
| 17 | 2 | Poppy Malik | (United Kingdom) Great Britain & N.I. | 52.62 | PB |
| 18 | 1 | Eveline Saalberg | Netherlands | 52.93 | |
| 19 | 5 | Veronika Drljačić | Croatia | 53.07 | |
| 20 | 4 | Rachel McCann | Ireland | 53.16 | PB |
| 21 | 1 | Astri Ertzgaard | Norway | 53.21 | PB |
| 22 | 3 | Anastazja Kuś | Poland | 53.45 | |
| 23 | 4 | Carina Vanessa | Portugal | 53.54 | |
| 24 | 5 | Milja Thureson | Finland | 55.58 | |
| 25 | 2 | Lauren Cadden | Ireland | 56.57 | |
| | 1 | Amber Anning | (United Kingdom) Great Britain & N.I. | DQ | TR17.2.3 |
| | 4 | Nikoleta Jíchová | Czech Republic | DQ | TR17.2.3 |
| | 3 | Tetiana Melnyk | Ukraine | DQ | TR17.2.3 |
| | 2 | Catia Gubelmann | Switzerland | DNS | |
| | 5 | Sharlene Mawdsley | Ireland | DNS | |

=== Semi-finals ===
The semi-finals were held on 7 March, the same day as round 1, starting at 19:58 (UTC+1) in the evening. Twelve athletes from nine nations competed in two heats. The first three athletes in each heat (Q) qualified for the semi-finals. Lieke Klaver of the Netherlands, Paula Sevilla of Spain, Henriette Jæger of Norway, and Lurdes Gloria Manuel of the Czech Republic were faster than in the first round, whilst the other eight athletes were all slower.

Results of the semi-finals
| Rank | Heat | Athlete | Nation | Time | Notes |
|---|---|---|---|---|---|
| 1 | 2 | Lieke Klaver | Netherlands | 51.17 | Q |
| 2 | 1 | Paula Sevilla | Spain | 51.23 | Q |
| 3 | 1 | Henriette Jæger | Norway | 51.27 | Q |
| 4 | 1 | Lurdes Gloria Manuel | Czech Republic | 51.41 | Q |
| 5 | 1 | Amandine Brossier | France | 52.07 | |
| 6 | 1 | Ama Pipi | (United Kingdom) Great Britain & N.I. | 52.29 | |
| 7 | 2 | Justyna Święty-Ersetic | Poland | 52.41 | Q |
| 8 | 2 | Alice Mangione | Italy | 52.67 | Q |
| 9 | 2 | Lada Vondrová | Czech Republic | 52.74 | |
| 10 | 2 | Eva Santidrián | Spain | 52.82 | |
| 11 | 2 | Imke Vervaet | Belgium | 52.84 | |
| 12 | 1 | Cathelijn Peeters | Netherlands | 53.21 | |

=== Final ===
The final was held on 8 March, starting at 21:50 (UTC+1) in the evening. Six athletes of six different nations competed in this race. Lieke Klaver of the Netherlands was in the lead after 200 metres, running this first lap in 23.4 s, and she stayed ahead of the other competitors in the last 200 metres. Klaver won the race in a European leading time (EL) of 50.38 s, claiming her first individual title at an international championship. Henriette Jæger of Norway finished in second place in 50.45 s and Paula Sevilla of Spain in third place in 50.99 s, which equalled the Spanish national record (=NR). All athletes were faster in the final than they were in the semi-finals.

In an interview after the race, Klaver said: "I found it so exciting. It's just healthy tension, but of a higher level. I'm so proud, I just did it. This is peaking at the right time, this is what I train for." Regarding her absent compatriot Femke Bol, she said: "I did think about her during the race. Like: pretend Femke is running in front of you. Then I have to keep going."

Result of the final
| Rank | Lane | Athlete | Nation | Time | Notes |
|---|---|---|---|---|---|
| 1st place, gold medalist(s) | 6 | Lieke Klaver | Netherlands | 50.38 | EL |
| 2nd place, silver medalist(s) | 4 | Henriette Jæger | Norway | 50.45 | |
| 3rd place, bronze medalist(s) | 5 | Paula Sevilla | Spain | 50.99 | =NR |
| 4 | 1 | Lurdes Gloria Manuel | Czech Republic | 51.38 | |
| 5 | 3 | Justyna Święty-Ersetic | Poland | 51.59 | |
| 6 | 2 | Alice Mangione | Italy | 51.84 | |
