= 2025 World Athletics Indoor Championships – Women's 400 metres =

Women's 400 metres at the 2025 World Athletics Indoor Championships
- Venue: Nanjing's Cube at Nanjing Youth Olympic Sports Park
- Location: Nanjing, China
- Dates: 21 March 2025 (round 1); 22 March 2025 (final)
- Competitors: 14 from 12 nations
- Winning time: 50.60

Medalists
gold medal	Amber Anning	Great Britain
silver medal	Alexis Holmes	United States
bronze medal	Henriette Jæger	Norway

The women's 400 metres at the 2025 World Athletics Indoor Championships took place on the short track of the Nanjing's Cube at Nanjing Youth Olympic Sports Park in Nanjing, China, on 21 and 22 March 2025. It was the 21st time the event was contested at the World Athletics Indoor Championships. Athletes could qualify by achieving the entry standard or by their World Athletics Ranking in the event.

The heats of round 1 were held on 21 March during the evening session. The final was held on 22 March during the evening session. It was won by Amber Anning of Great Britain in 50.60 s, followed by Alexis Holmes of the United States and Henriette Jæger of Norway.

== Background ==
The women's 400 metres was contested 20 times before 2025, at every previous edition of the World Athletics Indoor Championships.

Records before the 2025 World Athletics Indoor Championships
Record	Athlete (nation)	Time	Location	Date
World record	Femke Bol (NED)	49.17	Glasgow, United Kingdom	2 March 2024
Championship record	Femke Bol (NED)	49.17	Glasgow, United Kingdom	2 March 2024
World leading	Isabella Whittaker (USA)	49.24	Virginia Beach, Virginia, United States	15 March 2025

== Qualification ==
For the women's 400 metres, the qualification period ran from 1 September 2024 until 9 March 2025. Athletes could qualify by achieving the entry standards of 51.00 s. Athletes could also qualify by virtue of their World Athletics Ranking for the event or by virtue of their World Athletics Indoor Tour wildcard. There was a target number of 30 athletes.

== Results ==
=== Round 1 ===
The three heats of round 1 were held on 21 March, starting at 20:26 (UTC+8) in the evening. First two athletes of each heat (Q) qualified for the final.

Results from heats of round 1
Rank	Heat	Athlete	Nation	Time	Notes
1	3	Amber Anning	Great Britain	50.79	Q
2	1	Henriette Jæger	Norway	51.42	Q
3	1	Martina Weil	Chile	51.67 [.662]	Q, NR
4	2	Alexis Holmes	United States	51.67 [.666]	Q
5	3	Rosey Effiong	United States	52.13	Q
6	2	Justyna Święty-Ersetic	Poland	52.22	Q
7	2	Bassant Hemida	Egypt	52.62	
8	2	Leah Anderson	Jamaica	52.86	
9	3	Liu Yinglan	China	53.14	PB
10	3	Daniela Ledecká	Slovakia	53.39	
11	1	Sita Sibiri	Burkina Faso	55.54	NR
12	2	Bongiwe Mahlalela	Eswatini	56.34	PB
13	3	Anny de Bassi	Brazil	56.67	PB
	1	Joanne Reid	Jamaica	DNS	

=== Final ===
The final was held on 22 March, starting at 20:44 (UTC+8) in the evening.

Results of the final
Rank	Lane	Name	Nation	Time	Notes
1st place, gold medalist(s)	6	Amber Anning	Great Britain	50.60	
2nd place, silver medalist(s)	4	Alexis Holmes	United States	50.63	
3rd place, bronze medalist(s)	5	Henriette Jæger	Norway	50.92	
4	3	Martina Weil	Chile	51.78	
5	2	Justyna Święty-Ersetic	Poland	51.97	
6	1	Rosey Effiong	United States	52.90	
