= Karimah Davis =

American sprinter (born 1998)

Personal information
- Nationality: United States
- Born: 23 November 1998 (age 27)

Sport
- Sport: Athletics
- Event: Sprint

Achievements and titles
- Personal bests: 200m 22.62 (2023); 400m 51.03 (2025)
Medal record
Women's athletics
Representing United States
World Relays
Silver medal – second place	2025 Guangzhou	4×400 m relay

Karimah Davis (born 23 November 1998) is an American sprinter.

== Early life ==
Davis is from Palm Beach County in Florida. She was a dancer before focusing on athletics at high school. As a sophomore, Davis won county, district and regional titles in the 100 metres, 200 metres and 400 metres races. As a junior, she won all those titles again, but also the state championship in the 400 metres. In 2016, she committed to attend Florida State University. She later also attended the University of Kentucky before transferring to the University of South Carolina.

== Career ==
=== NCAA ===
Competing for the University of Kentucky, she was a member of the women’s 4x400m relay team which broke the collegiate record in their race at the SEC championships in 2022, alongside Dajour Miles, Abby Steiner and Alexis Holmes. The same quartet also won the NCAA title in June 2022.

For Kentucky, she placed eighth in the 200 metres at the 2023 NCAA Outdoor Championships. She was also a member of Kentucky’s 4x100 relay team alongside Victoria Perrow, Anthaya Charlton and Masai Russell who were silver medalists, running a time of 42.46 seconds.

=== Professional career ===
In February 2025, she finished fifth in the 400 metres at the US Indoor Championships in New York. She was subsequently selected for the United States relay pool at the 2025 World Athletics Indoor Championships in Nanjing, for the Women's 4 × 400 metres relay in March 2025.

In April 2025, she won the 200 metres at the Gamecock Invitational in a time of 23.00 seconds. Later that month, she ran a personal best 51.03 seconds for the 400 metres at the Tom Jones Invitational in Gainesville. She was named in the American team for the 2025 World Athletics Relays in Guangzhou, China in May 2025. She competed for the United States in the women's 4 x 400 metres relay, running a split of 50.56 seconds as the team won their heat to secure a place at the 2025 World Championships. In the final she ran a split of 50.03 seconds as the United States won the silver medal in the event behind Spain.

In May 2026, she ran at the 2026 World Athletics Relays in the women's 4 × 100 metres relay in Gaborone, Botswana.
