= Maya Singletary =

American sprinter

Personal information
- Nationality: United States
- Born: 9 December 1998 (age 27)
- Height: 165 cm (5 ft 5 in)

Sport
- Sport: Athletics
- Event: Sprint

Achievements and titles
- Personal bests: 200m 23.39 (2023); 400m 51.44 2023 (2023)
Medal record
Women's athletics
Representing United States
World Relays
| Silver medal – second place | 2025 Guangzhou | 4×400 m relay |

Maya Singletary (born 9 December 1998) is an American sprinter.

== Career ==
She attended the University of North Carolina at Charlotte. In February 2023, she broke the school record for the indoor 400 metres that had stood for 17 years. She also set a new outdoor school record for the 400 metres in April 2023, running 51.73 seconds at the Florida Relays.

In February 2024, she finishes seventh in the 400 metres at the American Indoor Athletics Championships. She was then named in the United States relay pool for the 2024 World Athletics Indoor Championships in Glasgow.

In February 2025, she finished sixth in the 400 metres at the US Indoor Championships in New York in an indoor personal best time of 52.34 seconds. She was subsequently selected for the United States relay pool at the 2025 World Athletics Indoor Championships in Nanjing, for the Women's 4 × 400 metres relay. On 24 April 2025, she was named in the American team for the 2025 World Athletics Relays in Guangzhou, China in May 2025.

== Personal life ==
She is from Raeford, North Carolina.
