= Hannah Kelly (athlete) =

British athlete (born 2000)

Personal information
- Born: 20 December 2000 (age 25) Bury, England
- Height: 180 cm (5 ft 11 in)

Sport
- Sport: Athletics
- Event: 400 metres
Medal record
Women's athletics
Representing Great Britain
Olympic Games
Bronze medal – third place	2024 Paris	4 × 400 m relay
World Indoor Championships
Bronze medal – third place	2024 Glasgow	4 × 400 m relay
European Indoor Championships
Silver medal – second place	2025 Apeldoorn	4 × 400 m relay

Hannah Kelly (born 20 December 2000) is a British track and field athlete. She has won multiple-medals at international level for Great Britain in the 4 × 400 metres relay, including at the 2024 Olympic Games.

== Early life ==
From Bury, Kelly attended the Holy Cross College. She joined the Bolton Harriers running club when she was eleven. She studied Law at the University of Birmingham.

== Career ==
Kelly qualified for the semi-finals in the 200 metres on her senior debut, aged 17 years-old, at the 2018 British Indoor Championships in Birmingham. That year she won the silver medal in the event at the English Under-20s Indoor Championships.

After stepping up to 400 metres, Kelly became the English U23 champion in 2021, in only her fourth outdoor race over the distance.

She successfully defended this title in 2022. Kelly made her international debut in February after being selected for the England team for the mixed 4 × 400 m relay team competing at the Dynamic New Athlete indoor event in Glasgow.

She was selected for the Great Britain squad at the 2023 European Indoor Championships held in Istanbul as part of the 4 × 400 m relay team.

She was selected for the 2024 World Athletics Indoor Championships in Glasgow as part of the 4 × 400 m relay team. The quartet set a new national record time of 3:26.04 in qualifying for the final.

In April 2024, she was selected as part of the British team for the 2024 World Athletics Relays in Nassau, Bahamas. In May 2024, she was selected to represent England at the Loughborough International. She was selected to run the 4 × 400 metres relay for Britain at the 2024 European Athletics Championships in Rome. On 5 July 2024, she was named in the British 4 × 400 metres relay squad for the 2024 Summer Olympics, where she won a bronze medal.

She was selected for the British relay team for the 2025 European Athletics Indoor Championships in Apeldoorn. She won a silver medal in the women’s 4 × 400 metres relay alongside Lina Nielsen, Amber Anning and Emily Newnham, with the quartet setting a new national record of three minutes, 24.89 seconds. She was named in the British team for the 2025 World Athletics Relays in Guangzhou.
