= Lurdes Gloria Manuel =

Czech athlete (born 2005)

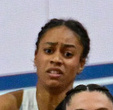
- Lurdes Gloria Manuel during the 2025 European Athletics Indoor Championships – Women's 400 metres

Personal information
- Nationality: Czech
- Born: 12 July 2005 (age 21) Ostrava, Czech Republic

Sport
- Sport: Athletics
- Event: Sprint
- Coached by: Laurent Meuwly

Achievements and titles
- Personal bests: 200 m : 23.63 (Prague, 2024); 300 m: 37.31 (Prague, 2024) AU20R; 400 m: 49.37 (Paris, 2026); Indoors; 400 m: 50.76 (Toruń, 2026)
Medal record
Women's athletics
Representing Czech Republic
World Indoor Championships
Gold medal – first place	2026 Toruń	400 metres
European Indoor Championships
Bronze medal – third place	2025 Apeldoorn	4 × 400 m relay
World U20 Championships
Gold medal – first place	2024 Lima	400 m
European U20 Championships
Gold medal – first place	2023 Jerusalem	400 m
Bronze medal – third place	2023 Jerusalem	4 × 400 m relay
European U18 Championships
Silver medal – second place	2022 Jerusalem	400 m

Lurdes Gloria Manuel (born 12 July 2005) is a Czech sprinter. She is the reigning World Indoor Champion over 400 metres having won the title at the 2026 World Athletics Indoor Championships. In 2024, she became Czech national indoor champion over 200 metres and set a European U20 indoor record over 300 metres, and became 2024 World U20 Champion over 400 metres. She won a bronze medal with the Czech women's 4 × 400 metres relay team at the 2025 European Indoor Championships.

== Biography ==
She was a silver medalist in the 400 metres at the 2022 European Athletics U18 Championships in Jerusalem.

At the Czech Championships in 2023 she finished second with a personal best of 51.23, a Czech age-group record. She won gold in the 400 metres at the 2023 European Athletics U20 Championships in Jerusalem. At the same championships she was a bronze medalist in the women's 4 × 400 metres relay.

=== 2024 ===
In January 2024, she set a new European U20 indoor record over 300 metres in Prague. In February 2024, she became Czech national indoor champion over 200 metres in Ostrava.

In May 2024, she lowered her own national under-20 record as she ran 50.59 for the 400 metres at the Ostrava Golden Spike event to meet the qualifying standard for the 2024 Paris Olympics. She lowered her personal best to 50.52 seconds in placing fourth overall in the final of the 2024 European Athletics Championships in Rome on 10 June 2024.

She competed at the 2024 Summer Olympics over 400 metres in August 2024, reaching the semi-final.

She qualified fastest for the final of the 400 metres at the 2024 World Athletics U20 Championships in Lima, Peru and went on to win gold in the final with a time of 51.29 seconds.

She was named "Junior Sportsperson of the year" at the Czech Republic's 2024 Sportsperson of the Year awards.

=== 2025 ===
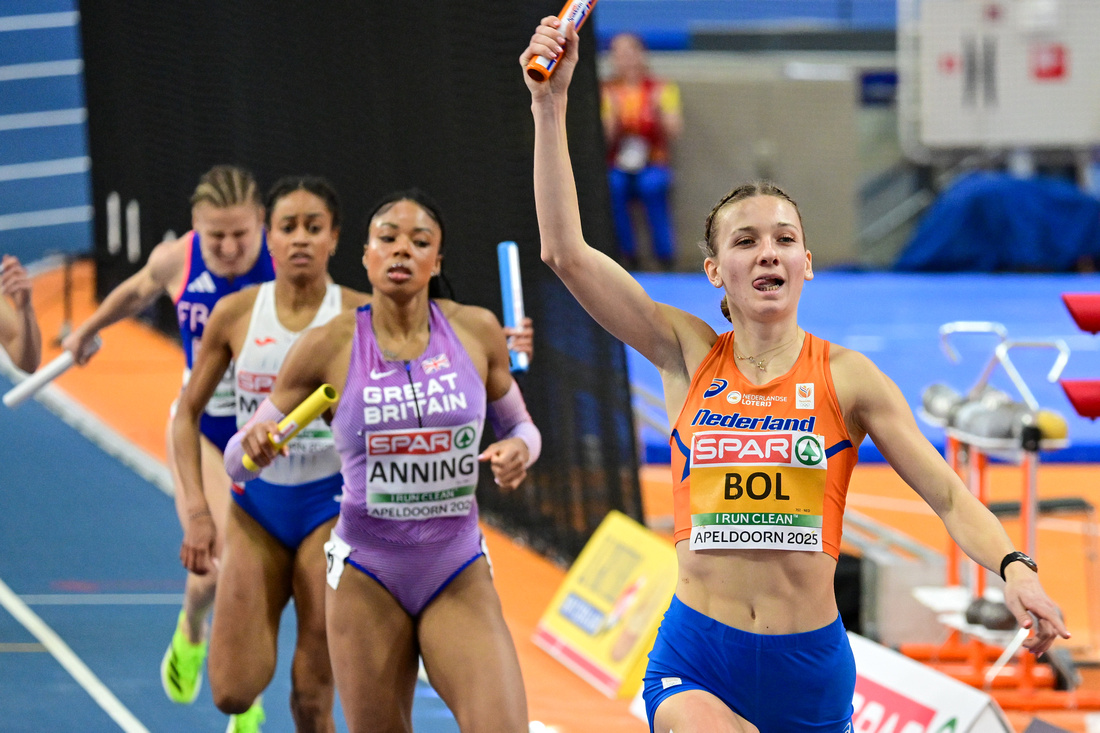
Manuel finishing in third place in the women's 4 × 400 metres relay at the 2025 European Indoor Championship

From February 2025, Manuel began to be coached by Laurent Meuwly in his stable of athletes including Femke Bol and Lieke Klaver. She ran an indoor personal best of 51.19 seconds at the Copernicus Cup on 16 February 2025. She was selected for the 2025 European Athletics Indoor Championships in Appeldoorn, Netherlands. She won a bronze medal with the Czech women's 4 × 400 metres relay team at the Championships.

=== 2026: Indoor World Champion ===
After returning from injury which saw her miss the 2025 outdoors season, she opened 2026 with an indoor personal best of 51.12 seconds for the 400 metres in Ostrava on 3 February 2026, her first race since the previous May. She set a new personal best of 51.03 seconds competing in Metz on 8 February. On 1 March, she won the 200 metres at the 2026 Czech Indoor Athletics Championships. On 21 March 2026, Manuel won gold in the 400 metres at the 2026 World Athletics Indoor Championships in Toruń with a new personal best of 50.76 seconds. In doing so at the age of 20 years-old, she became the youngest ever winner of the title at the Championships.

In May, she ran at the 2026 World Athletics Relays in the women's 4 × 400 metres relay in Gaborone, Botswana. On 4 June at the 2026 Golden Gala in Rome, she broke 50 seconds for the 400 metres for the first time, finishing runner-up to Henriette Jæger in 49.77 seconds. She was runner-up to the Norwegian again the following week at the 2026 Bislett Games. On 16 June, she won in a personal best of 49.74 at the Golden Spike meeting in Ostrava. On 28 June, she set a new personal best of 49.37 seconds at the 2026 Meeting de Paris. On 10 July, Manuel was third in 49.44 for 400 metres at the 2026 Herculis Diamond League event in Monaco. On 15 August, she placed fourth in the final of the 400 metres at the 2026 European Athletics Championships in Birmingham, England. At the 2026 Diamond League Final in Brussels in September, she placed fifth in the 400 metres. Later that month, she competed over 400 m at the inaugural World Ultimate Championship in Budapest.

On 8 November 2026, she won the Czech Athletics Federation's annual "Athlete of the Year" poll as the youngest winner in Czech history of the poll.

== Personal life ==
Manuel was born and grew up in the Czech Republic; her father is from Angola and her mother is from Russia. She has a younger brother, Christian Teca, and younger sister, Angela Linda. She is a member of TJ VS Tábor. Her nickname is Lu.

Awards
Preceded by Barbora Galušková	Czech Junior Athlete of the Year; 2024	Succeeded by Metoděj Jílek
