= Emma Montoya =

French sprinter (born 1999)

Personal information
- Born: 30 April 1999 (age 27) Nice, France
- Education: Boston University (BA,MA)
- Height: 170 cm (5 ft 7 in)
- Weight: 55 kg (121 lb)

Sport
- Country: France
- Sport: Athletics
- Events: Sprint, Hurdles

Achievements and titles
- Personal bests: 400m: 51.76 (Monaco, 2024); 400m hurdles: 56.35 (Limoges, 2025)

Emma Montoya (born 30 April 1999) is a French sprinter and hurdler.

== Early life ==
Emma is from La Gaude in the Métropole Nice Côte d'Azur in the south of France. She studied Biology for six years in the United States at Boston University.

== Career ==
In 2018, Emma was runner-up at the French junior championships over 400 metres. She placed fourth at the senior French Athletics Championships in Albi in 2023, over 400 metres hurdles.

On 10 April 2025, Emma was named in the French team for the 2025 World Athletics Relays in Guangzhou, China in May 2025. She competed in the women's 4 x 400 metres relay as the French team finished second behind the United States in their heat to secure a place at the 2025 World Championships.

Emma competed for France in the 400 metres hurdles at the 2025 European Athletics Team Championships First Division in Madrid, Spain. She was selected as part of the French team for the relay pool at the 2025 World Athletics Championships in Tokyo, Japan.

In May 2026, she ran at the 2026 World Athletics Relays in the women's 4 × 400 metres relay in Gaborone, Botswana.
