= Amandine Brossier =

French sprinter (born 1995)

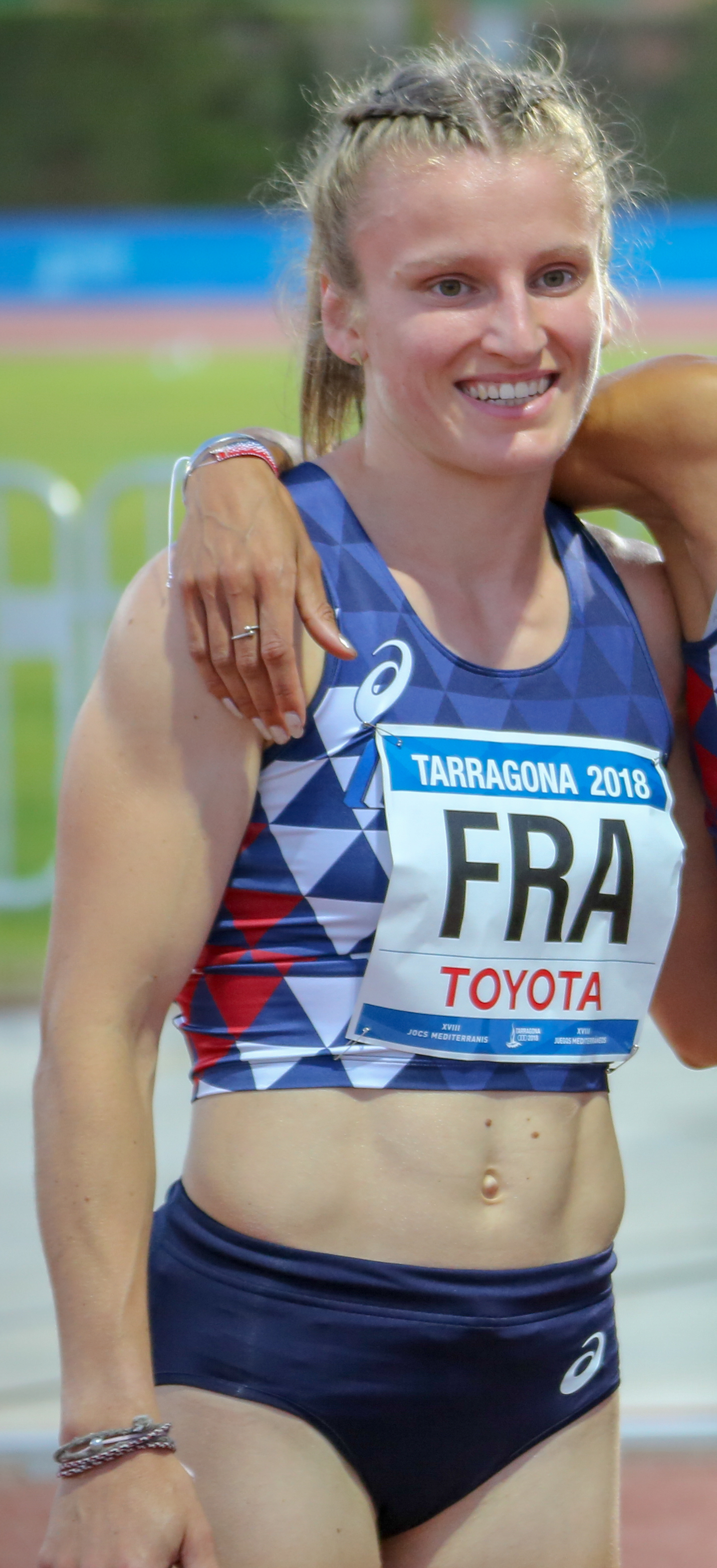
- Brossier in 2018

Personal information
- Born: 15 August 1995 (age 31) Cholet, France
- Education: University of Angers
- Height: 170 cm (5 ft 7 in)
- Weight: 60 kg (132 lb)

Sport
- Country: France
- Sport: Athletics
- Event: 400 m
- Club: Sco Angers Athlé
- Coached by: Sullivan Breton

Amandine Brossier (born 15 August 1995 in Cholet) is a French sprinter specialising in the 400 metres. She won a bronze medal at the 2019 Summer Universiade. Her first Olympic Games was Tokyo 2020. Her highest world ranking position was 21 in the women's 400m race.

== International competitions ==
Year	Competition	Venue	Position	Event	Notes
Representing France
2017	European U23 Championships	Bydgoszcz, Poland	14th (sf)	200 m	23.91
2017	European U23 Championships	Bydgoszcz, Poland	2nd	4 × 100 m relay	44.06
2018	Mediterranean Games	Tarragona, Spain	2nd	4 × 400 m relay	3:29.76
2018	World Cup	London, United Kingdom	5th	4 × 100 m relay	43.34
2019	European Indoor Championships	Birmingham, United Kingdom	17th (sf)	400 m	54.56
2019	European Indoor Championships	Birmingham, United Kingdom	4th	4 × 400 m relay	3:32.12
2019	World Relays	Yokohama, Japan	8th	4 × 400 m relay	3:36.28
2019	Universiade	Naples, Italy	3rd	400 m	51.77
2019	World Championships	Doha, Qatar	41st (h)	400 m	52.81
2019	World Championships	Doha, Qatar	12th (h)	4 × 400 m relay	3:29.66
2021	European Indoor Championships	Toruń, Poland	23rd (h)	400 m	53.23
2021	World Relays	Chorzów, Poland	8th (h)	4 × 400 m relay	3:30.46
2021	Olympic Games	Tokyo, Japan	16th (sf)	400 m	51.30
2021	Olympic Games	Tokyo, Japan	11th (h)	4 × 400 m relay	3:25.07
2022	World Championships	Eugene, United States	5th	4 × 400 m relay	3:25.81
2022	European Championships	Munich, Germany	9th (sf)	400 m	51.21
2022	European Championships	Munich, Germany	11th (h)	4 × 400 m relay	3:29.64
2023	World Championships	Budapest, Hungary	33rd (h)	400 m	51.98
2023	World Championships	Budapest, Hungary	8th	4 × 400 m relay	3:28.35
2024	World Indoor Championships	Glasgow, United Kingdom	11th (sf)	400 m	53.26
2024	European Championships	Rome, Italy	12th (sf)	400 m	51.78
2024	European Championships	Rome, Italy	5th	4 × 400 m relay	3:23.77
2024	Olympic Games	Paris, France	5th	4 × 400 m relay	3:21.41
2025	European Indoor Championships	Apeldoorn, Netherlands	5th (sf)	400 m	52.07
2025	European Indoor Championships	Apeldoorn, Netherlands	5th	4 × 400 m relay	3:25.80
2025	World Championships	Tokyo, Japan	7th	4 × 400 m relay	3:24.08
2026	World Indoor Championships	Toruń, Poland	14th (sf)	400 m	52.71

== Personal bests ==
Outdoor

- 200 metres – 23.33 (+2.0 m/s, Albi 2018)
- 400 metres – 50.43 (Monaco 2024)

Indoor

- 200 metres – 23.44 (Liévin 2018)
- 400 metres – 51.67 (Metz 2024)
