= Paula Sevilla =

Spanish athlete

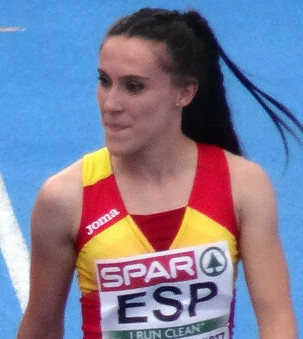
- Sevilla at the 2017 European U23 Championships

Personal information
- Full name: Paula Sevilla López de la Vieja
- Nationality: Spanish
- Born: 28 June 1997 (age 29) La Solana, Ciudad Real, Spain
- Height: 1.60 m (5 ft 3 in)

Sport
- Sport: Track and Field
- Events: 100m, 200m
Medal record
Women's athletics
Representing Spain
World Indoor Championships
Silver medal – second place	2026 Toruń	Mixed 4 × 400 m
Bronze medal – third place	2026 Toruń	4 × 400 m relay
World Relays
Gold medal – first place	2025 Guangzhou	4×400 m relay
Silver medal – second place	2025 Guangzhou	4×100 m relay
Silver medal – second place	2026 Gaborone	4 × 400 m relay
European Indoor Championships
Bronze medal – third place	2025 Apeldoorn	400 m
European Games
Bronze medal – third place	2023 Kraków-Małopolska	4×100 m relay
European Athletics Team Championships
Bronze medal – third place	2025 Madrid	400m
Silver medal – second place	2025 Madrid	4 × 100 m relay
Mediterranean Games
Silver medal – second place	2018 Tarragona	4×100 m relay

Paula Sevilla López de la Vieja (born 28 June 1997, in La Solana, Ciudad Real) is a Spanish athlete. She was the Spanish 100m national champion in 2019 and 2020. In 2022, she became the Spanish national champion in 200m, and in 2025 Spanish indoor champion over 400 metres. At the 2025 European Indoor Championships in Apeldoorn, Netherlands, she tied the national record over 400m while winning the bronze medal. She won a silver medal at the 2026 World Athletics Indoor Championships in the mixed 4 × 400 metres relay.

== Biography ==
Sevilla was part of the Spanish team that won gold at the 2017 European Athletics U23 Championships in Bydgoszcz, Poland in the women's 4x100m relay. In 2022, Sevilla's new personal best time of 22.86 placed her as the second fastest Spanish woman over 200m of all time, behind only Sandra Myers. When subsequently winning the Spanish national athletics championships shortly afterwards Sevilla actually ran a lower time than her new personal best, winning in a time of 22.73, but it was classified as a wind assisted race.

Sevilla was part of the Spanish 4 × 100 m team that finished fifth at the World Athletics Championships in Eugene, Oregon, twice breaking the Spanish national record. The team had initially broken the national record running 42.61 in the qualifying heats to qualify for the final. In the final the following day they lowered the national record again, to 42.58 seconds.

She was then announced as part of the Spanish team for the 2022 European Athletics Championships in Munich. In Munich, Sevilla competed individually in the 200m and finished tenth fastest in the semi-finals. The relay team finished fourth in the final with a time of 43.03 seconds.

She ran as part of the Spanish 4 × 100 m relay team at the 2024 World Relays Championships in Nassau, Bahamas. She was selected for the 2024 European Athletics Championships in Rome in June 2024. She competed in the 4 x 100 metres relay at the 2024 Paris Olympics.

In February 2025, she moved to second on the Spanish all-time indoor 400 metres list behind only Sandra Myers, running 51.20 seconds to win the Spanish Indoor Athletics Championships. Competing at the 2025 European Athletics Indoor Championships, she won her 400m semi-final in a time of 51.23 seconds. In the final, she equalled the Spanish indoor record of 50.99 seconds to win the bronze medal behind Lieke Klaver and Henriette Jæger. She was selected for the Spanish relay pool for the 2025 World Athletics Relays in China. In the 4 x 100 metres relay she was part of a team alongside Jaël Bestué, Esperança Cladera, and Maria Isabel Perez who won their opening race ahead of Jamaica containing Shelly-Ann Fraser-Pryce and Shericka Jackson, with a time of 42.18 seconds, setting a Spanish national record, and ensuring qualification for the 2025 World Championships. On the second day she won a gold medal with the women’s 4 x 400 metres relay team.

She ran a personal best 50.92 seconds for the 400 metres at the 2025 Bislett Games in Oslo on 12 June 2025. Competing for Spain at the 2025 European Athletics Team Championships, she ran a personal best 50.70 seconds for the 400 metres. At the championships, she was also part of the Spanish 4 x 100 metres team, again alongside Esperança Cladera, Maribel Perez and Bestue, which broke their own Spanish record, running 42.11 seconds. On 29 June she ran as part of the Spanish mixed 4x400 metres relay team which set a new national record time of 2.20.4.

She was selected for the Spanish team for the 2025 World Athletics Championships in Tokyo, Japan, running on the opening day in the mixed 4 × 400 metres relay. She ran a personal best of 50.89 seconds and reached the semi-finals of the women's 400 metres. She also ran in the women's 4 x 100 metres relay at the championships as the Spanish team finished fifth overall.

Sevilla was selected for the 2026 World Athletics Indoor Championships in Poland in March 2026, winning a silver medal in the mixed 4 x 400 metres relay. She also reached the semi-finals of the individual 400 metres. Later in the championships, she won the bronze medal with the women's 4 x 400 m relay team.

Competing at the 2026 World Athletics Relays in Botswana, she was part of the Spanish mixed 4 x 400 metres relay team which set a national record of 3:09.89 on the opening day. Later that day she helped the women's 4 x 400 m relay team also qualify for the final. The following day, she ran as the Spanish quartet achieved a 3:21.25 national record to win the silver medal in the women’s 4 x 400m final.

At the 2026 Spanish Outdoor Athletics Championships she placed second 0.01s behind Blanca Hervas with a time of 52.32s. She was a finalist in the 400 metres at the 2026 European Athletics Championships in Birmingham, England, placing eighth overall.

== International competitions ==
Year	Competition	Venue	Position	Event	Notes
Representing Spain
2015	European Junior Championships	Eskilstuna, Sweden	5th (h)	200 m	25.61
2016	World U20 Championships	Bydgoszcz, Poland	6th	4 × 100 m relay	44.99
2017	European U23 Championships	Bydgoszcz, Poland	21st (h)	100 m	11.99
2017	European U23 Championships	Bydgoszcz, Poland	1st	4 × 100 m relay	43.96
2018	Mediterranean U23 Championships	Jesolo, Italy	1st	100 m	11.41
2018	Mediterranean U23 Championships	Jesolo, Italy	3rd	4 × 100 m relay	45.28
2018	Mediterranean Games	Tarragona, Spain	5th	200 m	23.34
2018	Mediterranean Games	Tarragona, Spain	2nd	4 × 100 m relay	43.31
2018	European Championships	Berlin, Germany	18th (sf)	200 m	23.91
2018	European Championships	Berlin, Germany	8th	4 × 100 m relay	43.54
2019	Mediterranean U23 Indoor Championships	Miramas, France	1st	60 m i	7.43
2019	European Indoor Championships	Glasgow, United Kingdom	32nd (h)	60 m i	7.44
2019	European U23 Championships	Gävle, Sweden	4th	200 m	23.52
2019	European U23 Championships	Gävle, Sweden	6th	4 × 100 m relay	44.56
2021	European Indoor Championships	Toruń, Poland	32nd (h)	60 m i	7.44
2021	World Relays	Chorzów, Poland	9th (h)	4 × 100 m relay	44.38
2022	Ibero-American Championships	La Nucía, Spain	4th	100 m	11.48
2022	Ibero-American Championships	La Nucía, Spain	—	4 × 100 m relay	DQ
2022	World Championships	Eugene, United States	5th	4 × 100 m relay	42.58
2022	European Championships	Munich, Germany	10th (sf)	200 m	23.19
2022	European Championships	Munich, Germany	4th	4 × 100 m relay	43.03
2023	European Games	Kraków, Poland	9th	200 m	23.23
2023	European Games	Kraków, Poland	3rd	4 × 100 m relay	43.13
2023	World Championships	Budapest, Hungary	11th (h)	4 × 100 m relay	42.96
2024	World Relays	Nassau, Bahamas	7th (h)	4 × 100 m relay	42.85
2024	European Championships	Rome, Italy	16th (sf)	200 m	23.19
2024	European Championships	Rome, Italy	5th	4 × 100 m relay	42.84
2024	Olympic Games	Paris, France	11th (h)	4 × 100 m relay	42.77
2025	European Indoor Championships	Apeldoorn, Netherlands	3rd	400 m i	50.99
2025	European Indoor Championships	Apeldoorn, Netherlands	4th	4 × 400 m relay i	3:25.68
2025	World Athletics Relays	Guangzhou, People's Republic of China	1st	4 × 400 m relay	3:24.13
2025	World Athletics Relays	Guangzhou, People's Republic of China	2nd	4 × 100 m relay	42.28
2025	European Team Championships	Madrid, Spain	3rd	400m	50.70
2025	European Team Championships	Madrid, Spain	2nd	4 × 100 m relay	42.11
2025	World Championships	Tokyo, Japan	19th (sf)	400 m	50.97
2026	World Indoor Championships	Toruń, Poland	11th (sf)	400 m	52.19
2026	World Indoor Championships	Toruń, Poland	3rd	4 × 400 m relay	3:26.04
2026	European Championships	Birmingham, United Kingdom	8th	400 m	52.03
2026	European Championships	Birmingham, United Kingdom	4th	4 × 400 m relay	3:24.39
