= Amber Anning =

English sprinter (born 2000)

Amber Anning OLY
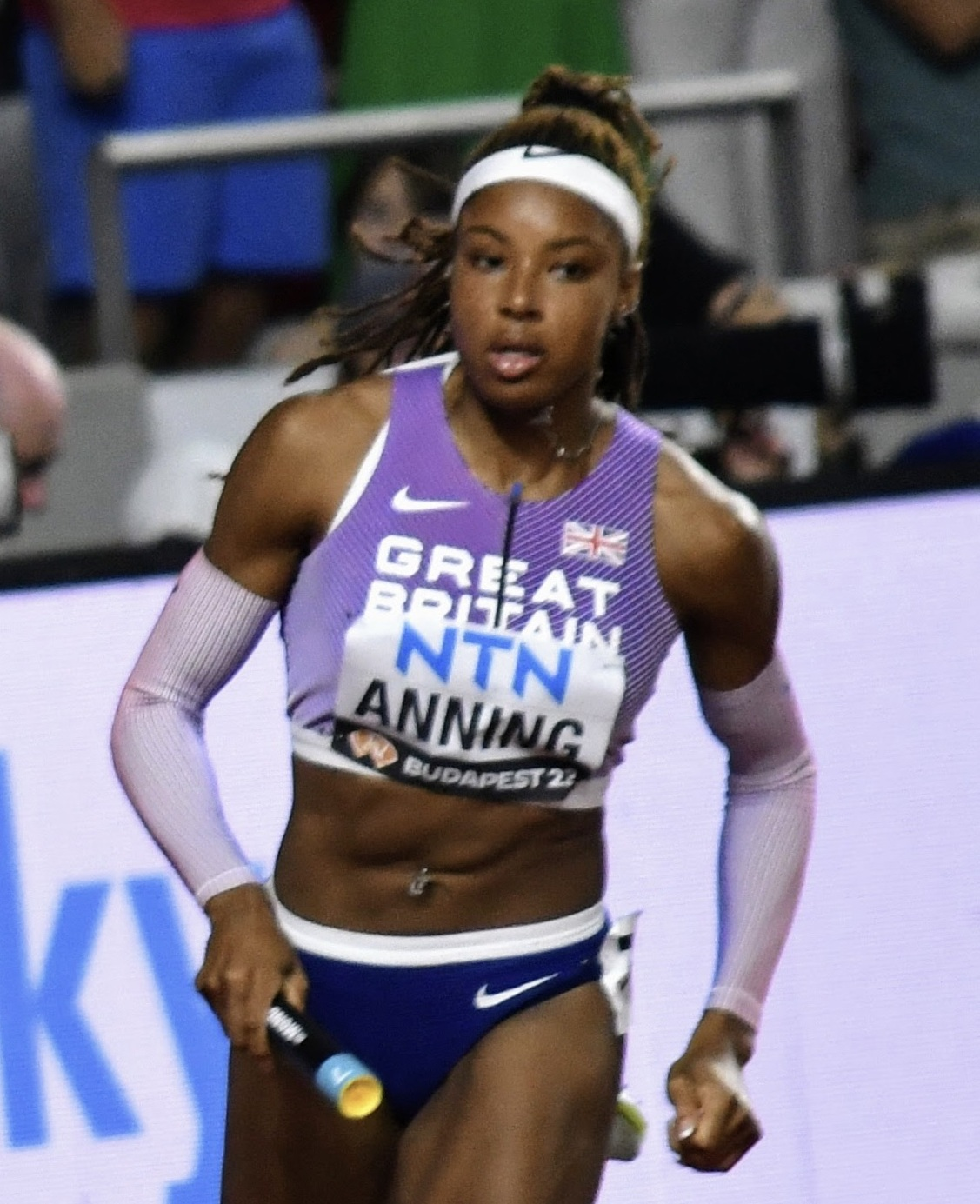
- Anning at the 2023 World Athletics Championships

Personal information
- Citizenship: British
- Born: 18 November 2000 (age 26) London, England
- Education: Brighton Hove & Sussex Sixth Form College; Louisiana State University; University of Arkansas

Sport
- Country: Great Britain
- Sport: Athletics
- College team: LSU Tigers; Arkansas Razorbacks
- Club: Brighton & Hove AC
- Coached by: Chris Johnson since 2022

Achievements and titles
- Olympic finals: 2024
- World finals: 2023
- Regional finals: 2019 Indoor
- Personal bests: 200 m: 22.60 (Fayetteville, 2024); 400 m: 49.29 NR (Paris, 2024)
Medal record
Representing Great Britain
Olympic Games
| Bronze medal – third place | 2024 Paris | 4 × 400 m relay |
| Bronze medal – third place | 2024 Paris | 4 × 400 m mixed |
World Athletics Championships
| Bronze medal – third place | 2023 Budapest | 4 × 400 metres relay |
World Athletics Indoor Championships
| Gold medal – first place | 2025 Nanjing | 400 metres |
European Athletics Indoor Championships
| Silver medal – second place | 2019 Glasgow | 4 × 400 metres relay |
| Silver medal – second place | 2025 Apeldoorn | 4 × 400 metres relay |
European Athletics U20 Championships
| Gold medal – first place | 2019 Borås | 4 × 400 metres relay |
| Silver medal – second place | 2019 Borås | 400 metres |
Representing England
Commonwealth Youth Games
| Silver medal – second place | 2017 Nassau | 4 × 400 metres relay |
| Bronze medal – third place | 2017 Nassau | 400 metres |

Amber Anning (born 18 November 2000) is an English sprinter. A double Olympic medalist, she is the 2025 World Athletics Indoor champion over 400 metres. She holds the British record for 400 metres, 49.29 seconds, which she recorded when finishing fifth in the women's 400 metres at the 2024 Paris Olympics.

She won two bronze medals at the 2024 Summer Olympics in the women's 4 × 400 metres relay and mixed 4 × 400 metres relay.

Anning is the British record holder indoors over 200 m and was part of British teams that won medals in the women's 4 × 400 metres relay events at the 2019 European Indoor Championships and 2023 World Championship. She also won medals at the 2017 Commonwealth Youth Games and the 2019 European Athletics U20 Championships. Anning competed in college athletics for LSU Tigers and Arkansas Razorbacks.

== Personal life ==
Anning was born in London the eldest of three sisters. She spent her early years in Hove and Australia. As a child, she participated in netball, swimming and athletics before choosing to specialise in the latter.

She attended Roedean School and Brighton Hove & Sussex Sixth Form College. In 2020, Anning began studying at Louisiana State University in the United States on a scholarship. In 2022, she transferred to the University of Arkansas. She graduated in 2024 with a degree in Advertising and Public Relations with minors in Journalism, Strategic Media and Psychology.

== Career ==
Anning has competed for Brighton & Hove Athletic Club since she was nine years old. From the age of 16, until his unexpected death in 2021, she was coached by Lloyd Cowan. Anning broke the British under-15 300 metres record running 38.73 seconds and was the first British under-15 to run sub 39 seconds. The previous record holder was Dina Asher-Smith.

At the 2017 Commonwealth Youth Games, Anning finished third in the 400 metres event and was part of the England team that finished second in the mixed 4 × 400 metres relay. She missed the 2018 IAAF World U20 Championships due to injury.

Aged 17, she won a bronze medal over 200 m at the British Indoor Championships. A year later, at 18, she came second over 400 m at the British Indoor Championships, running 53s dead to break the nearly 50-year-old British U20 Indoor record of Marilyn Neufville. With this she auto-qualified for the individual 400 m and the British relay squad, which won the silver medal in the women's 4 × 400 metres relay at the 2019 European Athletics Indoor Championships. In the same year, Anning also finished second in the 400 metres event at the 2019 European Athletics U20 Championships, and anchored the British team to victory in the women's 4 × 400 metres relay competition at the championships.

In 2020, she started competing in college athletics for LSU Tigers, where she was coached by Dennis Shaver. In August 2022, she transferred to Arkansas Razorbacks.

At the 2023 NCAA Division I Indoor Track and Field Championships, she was part of the Arkansas relay team that set the fastest women's indoor 4 × 400 metres relay time in history of 3:21.75. Anning's time on the first leg was the fifth fastest ever. Anning was a member of the British team that finished third in the women's 4 × 400 metres relay event at the 2023 World Athletics Championships. It was her first senior World Championships, and she ran the second leg of the race splitting 49.70 seconds in the heat and 49.82 seconds in the final.

In January 2024, Anning broke Katharine Merry's 25-year-old 200 m British Indoor record, clocking 22.60 at Fayetteville, Arkansas, USA.

In March 2024, she won the 400 m at the 2024 NCAA Division I Indoor Track and Field Championships in Boston in 50.79 seconds, leading her teammates Nickisha Pryce and Rosey Effiong to an historic podium as Arkansas became the first women's program to have a 1–2–3 finish in the 400 at the NCAA Indoor meet. The Arkansas Razorbacks, led for the first time by Head Coach, Chris 'Captain' Johnson, also won the women's team title for the second year in a row. In May 2024, Anning ran 49.51 seconds over 400 m at the SEC Track and Field Championships, to move to third place on the British All-Time list, behind Christine Ohuruogu and Kathy Smallwood. At the 2024 NCAA Division I Outdoor Track and Field Championships Anning won the bronze medal over 400 m, running 49.59 seconds, in an historic race in which the Razorbacks achieved a 'super sweep' of the top four places. In the women's 4 × 400 metres relay, Anning, Effiong, Pryce and Kaylyn Brown set a collegiate record time of 3:17.96 to win the event for Arkansas. Anning became a fully professional athlete in 2024 after graduating from Arkansas.

Later in 2024, Anning became the British 400 metres champion after winning the title at the 2024 British Athletics Championships and qualified for the 2024 Summer Olympics as a result. She was part of the mixed 4 × 400 team which won a bronze medal in a new national record of 3:08.01. In the individual event, she reached the final and finished fifth in 49.23 seconds, a national record and only three hundredths of a second from bronze.

At the 2025 European Athletics Indoor Championships in Apeldoorn, Anning was disqualified in the 400 m heats due to lane infringements. Later in the championships she was part of the British 4 × 400 metres relay team which won a silver medal. Later that month at the World Athletics Indoor Championships Anning became the first British woman to win the 400 metres indoor title.

She ran a season's best 49.75 seconds for fifth in the women's 400m at the Diamond League Final in Zurich on 28 August. She was selected as part of the British team for the 2025 World Athletics Championships in Tokyo, Japan.

== Achievements ==
=== Circuit performances ===
Grand Slam Track results
| Slam | Race group | Event | Pl. | Time | Prize money |
|---|---|---|---|---|---|
| 2025 Miami Slam | Long sprints | 400 m | 7th | 50.85 | US$12,500 |
| 2025 Miami Slam | Long sprints | 200 m | 6th | 22.97 | US$12,500 |

=== Personal bests ===
| Type | Distance | Time (s) | Wind (m/s) | Venue | Date | Notes |
|---|---|---|---|---|---|---|
| Outdoor | 100 metres | 11.49 | +0.2 | Tempe, United States | 19 March 2022 | |
| Outdoor | 200 metres | 22.66 | -0.5 | Gainesville, United States | 9 May 2024 | |
| Outdoor | 300 metres | 37.79 | —N/a | Loughborough, Great Britain | 1 September 2017 | |
| Outdoor | 400 metres | 49.29 | —N/a | Saint-Denis, France | 9 August 2024 | NR |
| Outdoor | Long jump | 5.57 m | 0.0 | Reading, Great Britain | 28 June 2015 | |
| Outdoor | Triple jump | 11.65 m | -1.0 | Ashford, Great Britain | 16 August 2015 | |
| Indoor | 60 metres | 7.45 | —N/a | Fayetteville, United States | 5 February 2022 | |
| Indoor | 200 metres sh | 22.60 | —N/a | Fayetteville, United States | 26 January 2024 | NR |
| Indoor | 300 metres sh | 39.37 | —N/a | Sheffield, Great Britain | 13 February 2016 | |
| Indoor | 400 metres sh | 50.43 | —N/a | Fayetteville, United States | 24 February 2024 | |
| Indoor | 800 metres sh | 2:05.05 | —N/a | Fayetteville, United States | 12 January 2024 | |
| | Team events | | | | | |
| Outdoor | 4 × 100 metres relay | 42.45 | —N/a | Eugene, United States | 6 June 2024 | |
| Outdoor | 4 × 200 metres relay | 1:31.11 | —N/a | Austin, United States | 30 March 2024 | |
| Outdoor | 4 × 400 metres relay | 3:17.96 | —N/a | Eugene, United States | 8 June 2024 | |
| Outdoor | 4 × 400 metres relay mixed | 3:08.01 | —N/a | Saint-Denis, France | 3 August 2024 | NR |
| Outdoor | Distance medley relay | 11:02.45 | —N/a | Austin, United States | 25 March 2022 | |
| Indoor | 4 × 400 metres relay sh | 3:21.75 | —N/a | Albuquerque, United States | 11 March 2023 | |
| Indoor | Distance medley relay sh | 10:49.14 | —N/a | Fayetteville, United States | 17 February 2023 | |

=== International competitions ===
Representing Great Britain
| Year | Competition | Venue | Position | Event | Result |
|---|---|---|---|---|---|
| 2017 | Commonwealth Youth Games | Nassau, Bahamas | 3rd | 400 m | 53.68 |
| 2017 | Commonwealth Youth Games | Nassau, Bahamas | 2nd | Mixed 4 × 400 m relay | 3:25.45 |
| 2019 | European Indoor Championships | Glasgow, Great Britain | 17th (h) | 400 m sh | 53.26 |
| 2019 | European Indoor Championships | Glasgow, Great Britain | 2nd | 4 x 400 m relay sh | 3:29.55 |
| 2019 | European U20 Championships | Borås, Sweden | 2nd | 400 m | 52.18 PB |
| 2019 | European U20 Championships | Borås, Sweden | 1st | 4 × 400 m relay | 3:33.07 WU23L |
| 2021 | European U23 Championships | Tallinn, Estonia | − | 200 m | DNS |
| 2023 | World Championships | Budapest, Hungary | 3rd | 4 × 400 m relay | 3:21.04 SB |
| 2024 | Olympic Games | Paris, France | 3rd | Mixed 4 × 400 m relay | 3:08.01 NR |
| 2024 | Olympic Games | Paris, France | 5th | 400 m | 49.29 NR |
| 2024 | Olympic Games | Paris, France | 3rd | 4 × 400 m relay | 3:19.72 NR |
| 2025 | European Indoor Championships | Apeldoorn, Netherlands | – | 400 m | DQ |
| 2025 | European Indoor Championships | Apeldoorn, Netherlands | 2nd | 4 × 400 m relay | 3:24.89 |
| 2025 | World Indoor Championships | Nanjing, China | 1st | 400 m | 50.60 |
| 2025 | World Championships | Tokyo, Japan | 5th | 400 m | 49.36 SB |
| 2026 | European Championships | Birmingham, Great Britain | 6th (sf)^{1} | 400 m | 49.96 SB |

^{1}Did not start in the final.
