= Eva Santidrián =

Spanish athlete (born 2000)

Personal information
- Full name: Eva Santidrián Ruiz
- Nationality: Spanish
- Born: 25 January 2000 (age 26) Burgos, Spain
- Height: 1.70 m (5 ft 7 in)

Sport
- Sport: Athletics
- Event: 400 metres

Achievements and titles
- Personal best(s): 400 m:: 52.39 (Nerja, 2022)
Medal record
Women's athletics
Representing Spain
World Relays
Gold medal – first place	2025 Guangzhou	4 × 400 m relay

Eva Santidrián Ruiz (Note: In this Spanish name, the first or paternal surname is Santidrián and the second or maternal family name is Ruiz.) (born 25 January 2000) is a Spanish track and field athlete. She is a multiple time national champion over 400 metres.

== Biography ==
In May 2022, she won gold in a Spanish U23 record time in the 4 × 400 m relay at the 2022 Ibero-American Championships in Athletics. In June 2022, she won the Spanish national title over 400 metres in a time of 52.39 seconds in Nerja.

She competed at the 2022 World Athletics Championships in the 4 × 400 m relay and the mixed 4 × 400 m relay. The team qualified for the final of the 2022 European Athletics Championships, in which they finished eighth.

In July 2023, she retained her Spanish national title over 400 metres. She was part of the Spanish relay team at the 2023 World Athletics Championships in Budapest.

She won the Spanish Indoor National Championships in a personal best indoor time of 52.67 seconds in February 2024. The following month, she was selected to compete for Spain at the 2024 World Athletics Indoor Championships in Glasgow, in the 400 metres.

She ran as part of the Spanish 4 × 400 m relay team which qualified for the 2024 Paris Olympics, at the 2024 World Relays Championships in Nassau, Bahamas. She was selected for the 2024 European Athletics Championships in Rome in June 2024. Her Spanish 4 × 400 m relay team qualified for the final and placed seventh overall. She competed in the women's 4 × 400 metres relay at the 2024 Paris Olympics.

She finished third in the 400 metres at the Spanish Indoor Athletics Championships in February 2025.

She was selected for the Spanish team for the 2025 World Athletics Championships in Tokyo, Japan, where she ran in the women's x 400 metres relay.

In May 2026, she ran at the 2026 World Athletics Relays in the mixed 4 × 400 metres relay in Gaborone, Botswana.

== Statistics ==
=== International competitions ===
Year	Competition	Venue	Position	Event	Time
Representing Spain
2016	European U18 Championships	Tbilisi, Georgia	6th	400 m	56.08
2021	European U23 Championships	Tallinn, Estonia	2nd	4 × 100 metres relay	43.74
2022	Mediterranean Games	Oran, Algeria	5th	200 m	23.56
2022	Ibero-American Championships	La Nucía, Spain	1st	4 × 400 m relay	3.31.72
2022	World Championships	Eugene, United States	11th (h)	Mixed 4 × 400 m relay	3:16.14
2022	World Championships	Eugene, United States	13th (h)	4 × 400 m relay	3:32.87
2022	European Championships	Munich, Germany	8th	4 × 400 m relay	3:29.70
2023	World Championships	Budapest, Hungary	15th (h)	Mixed 4 × 400 m relay	3:31.91
2024	World Indoor Championships	Glasgow, United Kingdom	16th (h)	400 m i	53.07
2024	World Relays	Nassau, Bahamas	14th (h)	4 × 400 m relay	3:31.03
2024	European Championships	Rome, Italy	7th	4 × 400 m relay	3:26.94
2024	Olympic Games	Paris, France	12th (h)	4 × 400 m relay	3:28.29
2025	European Indoor Championships	Apeldoorn, Netherlands	10th (sf)	400 m i	52.82
2025	European Indoor Championships	Apeldoorn, Netherlands	4th	4 × 400 m relay i	3:25.68
2025	World Championships	Tokyo, Japan	9th (h)	4 × 400 m relay	3:24.76

== Personal life ==
She is from Burgos in Spain.
