= Rachel McCann (sprinter) =

Irish athlete (born 2001)

Personal information
- Nationality: Irish
- Born: 26 September 2001 (age 25)

Sport
- Sport: Athletics
- Event: Sprint

Achievements and titles
- Personal bests: 400m: 53.60 (Dublin, 2024)

Rachel McCann (born 26 September 2001) is an Irish sprinter. She won the Irish Athletics Championships in 2026 in the 400 metres.

== Early life ==
From Bangor, she competed in hockey and practised ballet when she was younger before focusing on athletics. She attended Sullivan Upper School in Holywood and studied pharmaceutical science at Queen's University, Belfast.

== Career ==
She joined North Down Athletics Club in 2013. She anchored the Irish women's 4 × 400 m team to fifth place at the 2019 European Athletics U20 Championships in Borås. In August 2020, she finished third in the 400 metres at the senior Irish Athletics Championships.

In February 2022, she was part of the Irish mixed 4x400 metres relay team that set an indoors Irish national record in Glasgow. She travelled as a non-travelling reserve for the 2022 World Athletics Indoor Championships in Belgrade.

She was part of the Irish relay pool at the 2024 World Athletics Indoor Championships in Glasgow, and the 2024 World Athletics Relays in Nassau, Bahamas.

In June 2024, she placed second behind Sophie Becker in the 400 metres at the Irish Athletics Championships. In July 2024, she was officially selected for the relay pool at the 2024 Paris Olympics.

She finished third at the Irish Indoor Athletics Championship at Abbotstown on 23 February 2025 in the 400 metres. She was named in the Irish team for the 2025 European Athletics Indoor Championships in Apeldoorn, where she ran an indoor personal best of 53.16 seconds. In the women's 4 × 400 m relay she ran with the Irish team placing sixth overall.

She was selected for the Irish relay pool for the 2025 World Athletics Relays in Guangzhou, China in May 2025 where she ran with the women's 4 × 400 m relay team which successfully qualified for the 2025 world championships. She was runner-up to Sophie Becker in the 400m at the 2025 Irish Athletics Championships. She was named in the Irish relay pool for the 2025 World Athletics Championships in Tokyo, Japan, where she ran in the women's x 400 metres relay.

McCann was named in the Irish team for the 2026 World Athletics Relays in Botswana, running in the women's 4 × 400 m relay as they secured qualification for the 2027 World Championships. On 26 July, McCann won the national title in the 400 metres at the 2026 Irish Championships, finishing ahead of defending champion Sophie Becker.
