= List of World Athletics Indoor Championships medalists (women) =

This is the complete list of women's medalists at the IAAF World Indoor Championships.

== Current program ==
=== 60 metres ===
Championships	Gold		Silver		Bronze	
1987	Nelli Cooman; Netherlands	7.08	Anelia Nuneva; Bulgaria	7.10	Angela Bailey; Canada	7.12 PB
1989	Nelli Cooman; Netherlands	7.05 CR	Gwen Torrence; United States	7.07 AR	Merlene Ottey; Jamaica	7.10
1991	Irina Privalova; Soviet Union	7.02 CR	Merlene Ottey; Jamaica	7.08	Liliana Allen; Cuba	7.12 NR
1993	Gail Devers; United States	6.95 CR	Irina Privalova; Russia	6.97	Zhanna Block; Ukraine	7.21
1995	Merlene Ottey; Jamaica	6.97	Melanie Paschke; Germany	7.10 PB	Carlette Guidry-White; United States	7.11
1997	Gail Devers; United States	7.06	Chandra Sturrup; Bahamas	7.15	Frédérique Bangué; France	7.17
1999	Ekateríni Thánou; Greece	6.96 WL	Gail Devers; United States	7.02	Philomena Mensah; Canada	7.07
2001	Chandra Sturrup; Bahamas	7.05 PB	Angela Williams; United States	7.09 PB	Chryste Gaines; United States	7.12 PB
2003	Angela Williams; United States	7.16 SB	Torri Edwards; United States	7.17 PB	Merlene Ottey; Slovenia	7.20
2004	Gail Devers; United States	7.08 SB	Kim Gevaert; Belgium	7.12 NR	Yuliya Nestsiarenka; Belarus	7.12
2006	Me'Lisa Barber; United States	7.01 WL	Lauryn Williams; United States	7.01 WL	Kim Gevaert; Belgium	7.11 NR
2008	Angela Williams; United States	7.06 WL	Jeanette Kwakye; Great Britain	7.08 NR	Tahesia Harrigan-Scott; British Virgin Islands	7.09 NR
2010	Veronica Campbell Brown; Jamaica	7.00 PB	Carmelita Jeter; United States	7.05	Ruddy Zang Milama; Gabon	7.14
2012	Veronica Campbell Brown; Jamaica	7.01 WL	Murielle Ahouré; Ivory Coast	7.04 NR	Tianna Bartoletta; United States	7.09
2014	Shelly-Ann Fraser-Pryce; Jamaica	6.98 WL	Murielle Ahouré; Ivory Coast	7.01 SB	Tianna Bartoletta; United States	7.06 SB
2016	Barbara Pierre; United States	7.02	Dafne Schippers; Netherlands	7.04	Elaine Thompson; Jamaica	7.06
2018	Murielle Ahouré; Ivory Coast	6.97 WL	Marie-Josée Ta Lou; Ivory Coast	7.05 PB	Mujinga Kambundji; Switzerland	7.05
2022	Mujinga Kambundji; Switzerland	6.96 WL NR	Mikiah Brisco; United States	6.99 PB	Marybeth Sant-Price; United States	7.04 PB
2024	Julien Alfred; Saint Lucia	6.98 =WL	Ewa Swoboda; Poland	7.00	Zaynab Dosso; Italy	7.05
2025	Mujinga Kambundji; Switzerland	7.04	Zaynab Dosso; Italy	7.06	Patrizia van der Weken; Luxembourg	7.07
2026	Zaynab Dosso; Italy	7.00	Jacious Sears; United States	7.03 [.022]	Julien Alfred; Saint Lucia	7.03 [.025]

=== 400 metres ===
Championships	Gold		Silver		Bronze	
1987	Sabine Busch; East Germany	51.66	Lillie Leatherwood; United States	52.54 PB	Judit Forgács; Hungary	52.68
1989	Helga Arendt; West Germany	51.52 CR	Diane Dixon; United States	51.77 AR	Jillian Richardson; Canada	52.02
1991	Diane Dixon; United States	50.64 CR	Sandra Myers; Spain	50.99 NR	Anita Protti; Switzerland	51.41 NR
1993	Sandie Richards; Jamaica	50.93 NR	Tatyana Alekseyeva; Russia	51.03 NR	Jearl Miles Clark; United States	51.37 PB
1995	Irina Privalova; Russia	50.23 CR	Sandie Richards; Jamaica	51.38	Daniela Georgieva; Bulgaria	51.78
1997	Jearl Miles Clark; United States	50.96 WL	Sandie Richards; Jamaica	51.17 PB	Helena Fuchsová; Czech Republic	52.04 PB
1999	Grit Breuer; Germany	50.80 WL	Falilat Ogunkoya; Nigeria	51.25 PB	Jearl Miles Clark; United States	51.45
2001	Sandie Richards; Jamaica	51.04	Olga Kotlyarova; Russia	51.56	Olesya Zykina; Russia	51.71
2003	Natalya Nazarova; Russia	50.83	Christine Amertil; Bahamas	51.11 NR	Grit Breuer; Germany	51.13 SB
2004	Natalya Nazarova; Russia	50.19 CR	Olesya Krasnomovets; Russia	50.65 PB	Tonique Williams-Darling; Bahamas	50.87 NR
2006	Olesya Krasnomovets; Russia	50.04 CR	Vania Stambolova; Bulgaria	50.21 NR	Christine Amertil; Bahamas	50.34 AR
2008	Olesya Zykina; Russia	51.09 WL	Natalya Nazarova; Russia	51.10 SB	Shareese Woods; United States	51.41 PB
2010	Debbie Dunn; United States	51.04	Tatyana Firova; Russia	51.13 PB	Vania Stambolova; Bulgaria	51.50 SB
2012	Sanya Richards-Ross; United States	50.79	Aleksandra Fedoriva; Russia	51.76	Natasha Hastings; United States	51.82
2014	Francena McCorory; United States	51.12	Kaliese Spencer; Jamaica	51.54 PB	Shaunae Miller; Bahamas	52.06
2016	Oluwakemi Adekoya; Bahrain	51.45 AIR	Ashley Spencer; United States	51.72	Quanera Hayes; United States	51.76
2018	Courtney Okolo; United States	50.55 PB	Shakima Wimbley; United States	51.47	Eilidh Doyle; Great Britain	51.60 SB
2022	Shaunae Miller-Uibo; Bahamas	50.31 SB	Femke Bol; Netherlands	50.57	Stephenie Ann McPherson; Jamaica	50.79 NR
2024	Femke Bol; Netherlands	49.17 WR	Lieke Klaver; Netherlands	50.16	Alexis Holmes; United States	50.24 PB
2025	Amber Anning; Great Britain	50.60	Alexis Holmes; United States	50.63	Henriette Jæger; Norway	50.92
2026	Lurdes Gloria Manuel; Czech Republic	50.76 PB	Natalia Bukowiecka; Poland	50.83 NR	Lieke Klaver; Netherlands	51.02

=== 800 metres ===
Championships	Gold		Silver		Bronze	
1987	Christine Wachtel; East Germany	2:01.32	Gabriela Sedláková; Czechoslovakia	2:01.85 WJ	Lyubov Kiryukhina-Tsyoma; Soviet Union	2:01.98
1989	Christine Wachtel; East Germany	1:59.24 CR	Tatyana Grebenchuk; Soviet Union	1:59.53 PB	Ellen Kiessling; East Germany	1:59.68 PB
1991	Christine Wachtel; Germany	2:01.51	Violeta Szekely; Romania	2:01.75	Ella Kovacs; Romania	2:01.79
1993	Maria de Lurdes Mutola; Mozambique	1:57.55 CR	Svetlana Masterkova; Russia	1:59.18 NR	Joetta Clark Diggs; United States	1:59.86 PB
1995	Maria de Lurdes Mutola; Mozambique	1:57.62	Yelena Afanasyeva; Russia	1:59.79 PB	Letitia Vriesde; Suriname	2:00.36 AR
1997	Maria de Lurdes Mutola; Mozambique	1:58.96	Natalya Dukhnova; Belarus	1:59.31 NR	Joetta Clark Diggs; United States	1:59.82 PB
1999	Ludmila Formanová; Czech Republic	1:56.90 CR	Maria de Lurdes Mutola; Mozambique	1:57.17	Natalya Tsyganova; Russia	1:57.47 NR
2001	Maria de Lurdes Mutola; Mozambique	1:59.74	Stephanie Graf; Austria	1:59.78	Helena Fuchsová; Czech Republic	2:01.18
2003	Maria de Lurdes Mutola; Mozambique	1:58.94	Stephanie Graf; Austria	1:59.39 SB	Mayte Martínez; Spain	1:59.53 NR
2004	Maria de Lurdes Mutola; Mozambique	1:58.50	Jolanda Batageli; Slovenia	1:58.72 SB	Joanne Fenn; Great Britain	1:59.50 NR
2006	Maria de Lurdes Mutola; Mozambique	1:58.90 SB	Kenia Sinclair; Jamaica	1:59.54 NR	Hasna Benhassi; Morocco	2:00.34 SB
2008	Tamsyn Manou; Australia	2:02.57	Tetiana Petlyuk; Ukraine	2:02.66	Maria de Lurdes Mutola; Mozambique	2:02.97
2010	Mariya Savinova; Russia	1:58.26 WL	Jennifer Meadows; Great Britain	1:58.43 NR	Alysia Johnson Montano; United States	1:59.60 PB
2012	Pamela Jelimo; Kenya	1:58.83 WL	Nataliia Lupu; Ukraine	1:59.67 PB	Erica Moore; United States	1:59.97 PB
2014	Chanelle Price; United States	2:00.09 WL	Angelika Cichocka; Poland	2:00.45	Marina Arzamasova; Belarus	2:00.79 PB
2016	Francine Niyonsaba; Burundi	2:00.01 WL	Ajeé Wilson; United States	2:00.27	Margaret Nyairera Wambui; Kenya	2:00.44 PB
2018	Francine Niyonsaba; Burundi	1:58.31 WL	Ajeé Wilson; United States	1:58.99 PB	Shelayna Oskan-Clarke; Great Britain	1:59.81 PB
2022	Ajeé Wilson; United States	1:59.09 SB	Freweyni Hailu; Ethiopia	2:00.54 SB	Halimah Nakaayi; Uganda	2:00.66
2024	Tsige Duguma; Ethiopia	2:01.90	Jemma Reekie; Great Britain	2:02.72	Noélie Yarigo; Benin	2:03.15
2025	Prudence Sekgodiso; South Africa	1:58.40 WL	Nigist Getachew; Ethiopia	1:59.63 PB	Patricia Silva; Portugal	1:59.80 NR
2026	Keely Hodgkinson; Great Britain	1:55.30 CR	Audrey Werro; Switzerland	1:56.64 NR	Addison Wiley; United States	1:58.36 PB

=== 1500 metres ===
Championships	Gold		Silver		Bronze	
1987	Doina Melinte; Romania	4:05.68	Tatyana Samolenko-Dorovskikh; Soviet Union	4:07.08 PB	Svetlana Kitova; Soviet Union	4:07.59 PB
1989	Doina Melinte; Romania	4:04.79 CR	Svetlana Kitova; Soviet Union	4:05.71 PB	Yvonne Mai-Graham; East Germany	4:06.09 PB
1991	Lyudmila Rogachova; Soviet Union	4:05.09	Ivana Kubesova; Czechoslovakia	4:06.22 NR	Tudorita Chidu; Romania	4:06.27 PB
1993	Yekaterina Podkopayeva; Russia	4:09.29	Violeta Szekely; Romania	4:09.41	Sandra Gasser; Switzerland	4:10.99
1995	Regina Jacobs; United States	4:12.61 PB	Carla Sacramento; Portugal	4:13.02	Maite Zúñiga; Spain	4:16.63
1997	Yekaterina Podkopayeva; Russia	4:05.19 PB	Patricia Djaté-Taillard; France	4:06.16 NR	Lidia Chojecka; Poland	4:06.25 NR
1999	Gabriela Szabo; Romania	4:03.23 CR	Lidia Chojecka; Poland	4:05.86 NR	Olga Komyagina; Russia	4:06.18 PB
2001	Hasna Benhassi; Morocco	4:10.83	Violeta Szekely; Romania	4:11.17	Natalya Gorelova; Russia	4:11.74
2003	Regina Jacobs; United States	4:01.67 CR	Kelly Holmes; Great Britain	4:02.66 NR	Yekaterina Rozenberg; Russia	4:02.80
2004	Kutre Dulecha; Ethiopia	4:06.40	Carmen Douma-Hussar; Canada	4:08.18 NR	Gulnara Galkina; Russia	4:08.26
2006	Yuliya Fomenko Chizhenko; Russia	4:04.70	Elena Soboleva; Russia	4:05.21	Maryam Yusuf Jamal; Bahrain	4:05.53
2008	Gelete Burka; Ethiopia	3:59.75 AR	Maryam Yusuf Jamal; Bahrain	3:59.79 AR	Daniela Yordanova; Bulgaria	4:04.19 NR
2010	Kalkidan Gezahegne; Ethiopia	4:08.14	Natalia Rodríguez; Spain	4:08.30	Gelete Burka; Ethiopia	4:08.39
2012	Genzebe Dibaba; Ethiopia	4:05.78	Mariem Alaoui Selsouli; Morocco	4:07.78	Hind Déhiba Chahyd; France	4:10.30
2014	Abeba Aregawi; Sweden	4:00.61	Axumawit Embaye; Ethiopia	4:07.12 PB	Nicole Sifuentes; Canada	4:07.61 NIR
2016	Sifan Hassan; Netherlands	4:04.96	Dawit Seyaum; Ethiopia	4:05.30	Gudaf Tsegay; Ethiopia	4:05.71
2018	Genzebe Dibaba; Ethiopia	4:05.27	Laura Muir; Great Britain	4:06.23	Sifan Hassan; Netherlands	4:07.26
2022	Gudaf Tsegay; Ethiopia	3:57.19 CR	Axumawit Embaye; Ethiopia	4:02.29	Hirut Meshesha; Ethiopia	4:03.39
2024	Freweyni Hailu; Ethiopia	4:01.46	Nikki Hiltz; United States	4:02.32	Emily Mackay; United States	4:02.69
2025	Gudaf Tsegay; Ethiopia	3:54.86 CR	Diribe Welteji; Ethiopia	3:59.30	Georgia Hunter Bell; Great Britain	3:59.84 PB
2026	Georgia Hunter Bell; Great Britain	3:58.53 WL	Jessica Hull; Australia	3:59.45 AR	Nikki Hiltz; United States	3:59.68 PB

=== 3000 metres ===
Championships	Gold		Silver		Bronze	
1987	Tatyana Samolenko-Dorovskikh; Soviet Union	8:46.52	Olga Bondarenko; Soviet Union	8:47.08	Maricica Puica; Romania	8:47.92
1989	Elly van Hulst; Netherlands	8:33.82 WR	Liz McColgan-Nuttall; Great Britain	8:34.80 NR	Margareta Keszeg; Romania	8:48.70 PB
1991	Marie-Pierre Duros; France	8:50.69 NR	Margareta Keszeg; Romania	8:51.51	Lyubov Kremlyova; Soviet Union	8:51.90 PB
1993	Yvonne Murray; Great Britain	8:50.55	Margareta Keszeg; Romania	9:02.89	Lynn Jennings; United States	9:03.78
1995	Gabriela Szabo; Romania	8:54.50	Lynn Jennings; United States	8:55.23	Joan Nesbit; United States	8:56.08 PB
1997	Gabriela Szabo; Romania	8:45.75 WL	Sonia O'Sullivan; Ireland	8:46.19 NR	Fernanda Ribeiro; Portugal	8:49.79
1999	Gabriela Szabo; Romania	8:36.42	Zahra Ouaziz; Morocco	8:38.43 AR	Regina Jacobs; United States	8:39.14 AR
2001	Olga Yegorova; Russia	8:37.48 NR	Gabriela Szabo; Romania	8:39.65	Yelena Zadorozhnaya; Russia	8:40.15 PB
2003	Berhane Adere; Ethiopia	8:40.25	Marta Domínguez; Spain	8:42.17	Meseret Defar; Ethiopia	8:42.58 PB
2004	Meseret Defar; Ethiopia	9:11.22	Berhane Adere; Ethiopia	9:11.43	Shayne Culpepper; United States	9:12.15
2006	Meseret Defar; Ethiopia	8:38.80	Liliya Shobukhova; Russia	8:42.18	Lidia Chojecka; Poland	8:42.59 SB
2008	Meseret Defar; Ethiopia	8:38.79	Meselech Melkamu; Ethiopia	8:41.50	Mariem Alaoui Selsouli; Morocco	8:41.66
2010	Meseret Defar; Ethiopia	8:51.17	Vivian Jepkemoi Cheruiyot; Kenya	8:51.85	Sentayehu Ejigu; Ethiopia	8:52.08
2012	Hellen Onsando Obiri; Kenya	8:37.16	Meseret Defar; Ethiopia	8:38.26	Gelete Burka; Ethiopia	8:40.18
2014	Genzebe Dibaba; Ethiopia	8:55.04	Hellen Obiri; Kenya	8:57.72	Maryam Yusuf Jamal; Bahrain	8:59.16
2016	Genzebe Dibaba; Ethiopia	8:47.43	Meseret Defar; Ethiopia	8:54.26	Shannon Rowbury; United States	8:55.55
2018	Genzebe Dibaba; Ethiopia	8:45.05	Sifan Hassan; Netherlands	8:45.68 SB	Laura Muir; Great Britain	8:45.78 SB
2022	Lemlem Hailu; Ethiopia	8:41.82 SB	Elinor Purrier St. Pierre; United States	8:42.04	Ejgayehu Taye; Ethiopia	8:42.23
2024	Elle St. Pierre; United States	8:20.87 CR, AR	Gudaf Tsegay; Ethiopia	8:21.13	Beatrice Chepkoech; Kenya	8:22.68 NR
2025	Freweyni Hailu; Ethiopia	8:37.21	Shelby Houlihan; United States	8:38.26	Jessica Hull; Australia	8:38.28
2026	Nadia Battocletti; Italy	8:57.64	Emily Mackay; United States	8:58.12	Jessica Hull; Australia	8:58.18

=== 60 metres hurdles ===
Championships	Gold		Silver		Bronze	
1987	Cornelia Oschkenat; East Germany	7.82	Yordanka Donkova; Bulgaria	7.85	Ginka Zagorcheva; Bulgaria	7.99
1989	Yelizaveta Chernyshova; Soviet Union	7.82	Ludmila Engquist; Soviet Union	7.83	Cornelia Oschkenat; East Germany	7.86
1991	Ludmila Engquist; Soviet Union	7.88	Monique Éwanjé-Épée Tourret; France	7.90	Aliuska López; Cuba	8.03
1993	Julie Baumann; Switzerland	7.96	LaVonna Martin-Floreal; United States	7.99	Patricia Girard; France	8.01
1995	Aliuska López; Cuba	7.92	Olga Shishigina; Kazakhstan	7.92	Brigita Bukovec; Slovenia	7.93
1997	Michelle Freeman; Jamaica	7.82	Gillian Russell-Love; Jamaica	7.84 PB	Cheryl Dickey; United States	7.84 PB
1999	Olga Shishigina; Kazakhstan	7.86	Glory Alozie; Nigeria	7.87	Keturah Anderson; Canada	7.90 NR
2001	Anjanette Kirkland; United States	7.85 PB	Michelle Freeman; Jamaica	7.92	Nicole Ramalalanirina; France	7.96
2003	Gail Devers; United States	7.81	Glory Alozie; Spain	7.90	Melissa Morrison-Howard; United States	7.92
2004	Perdita Felicien; Canada	7.75 CR	Gail Devers; United States	7.78	Linda Ferga-Khodadin; France	7.82 NR
2006	Derval O'Rourke; Ireland	7.84 NR	Glory Alozie; Spain	7.86 SB	Susanna Kallur; Sweden	7.87
2008	Lolo Jones; United States	7.80	Candice Price; United States	7.93	Anay Tejeda; Cuba	7.98
2010	Lolo Jones; United States	7.72 CR	Perdita Felicien; Canada	7.86 SB	Priscilla Lopes-Schliep; Canada	7.87
2012	Sally Pearson; Australia	7.73 WL	Tiffany Porter; Great Britain	7.94	Alina Talay; Belarus	7.97 SB
2014	Nia Ali; United States	7.80 PB	Sally Pearson; Australia	7.85	Tiffany Porter; Great Britain	7.86 SB
2016	Nia Ali; United States	7.81 SB	Brianna Rollins; United States	7.82	Tiffany Porter; Great Britain	7.90
2018	Kendra Harrison; United States	7.70 CR	Christina Manning; United States	7.79	Nadine Visser; Netherlands	7.84
2022	Cyréna Samba-Mayela; France	7.78 NR	Devynne Charlton; Bahamas	7.81 NR	Gabbi Cunningham; United States	7.87
2024	Devynne Charlton; Bahamas	7.65 WR	Cyréna Samba-Mayela; France	7.74	Pia Skrzyszowska; Poland	7.79
2025	Devynne Charlton; Bahamas	7.72 SB	Ditaji Kambundji; Switzerland	7.73	Ackera Nugent; Jamaica	7.74 SB
2026	Devynne Charlton; Bahamas	7.65 =WR	Nadine Visser; Netherlands	7.73 SB	Pia Skrzyszowska; Poland	7.73 NR

=== 4 × 400 metres relay ===
Championships	Gold		Silver		Bronze	
1991	Germany (GER); Sandra Seuser; Katrin Schreiter; Annett Hesselbarth; Grit Breuer	3:27.22 WR	Soviet Union (URS); Marina Shmonina; Lyudmila Dzhigalova; Margarita Khromova-Ponomaryova; Aelita Yurchenko	3:27.95 NR	United States (USA); Terri Dendy; Lillie Leatherwood; Jearl Miles Clark; Diane Dixon	3:29.00 AR
1993	Jamaica (JAM); Deon Hemmings; Beverly Grant; Cathy Rattray-Williams; Sandie Richards	3:32.32 NR	United States (USA); Trevaia Williams; Terri Dendy; Dyan Webber; Natasha Kaiser-Brown	3:32.50	none awarded	
1995	Russia (RUS); Tatyana Chebykina; Yelena Ruzina; Yekaterina Kulikova; Svetlana Goncharenko	3:29.29 NR	Czech Republic (CZE); Nadia Kostoválová; Helena Dziurová; Hana Benešová; Ludmila Formanová	3:30.27	United States (USA); Nelrae Pasha; Tanya Dooley; Kim Graham; Flirtisha Harris	3:31.43
1997	Russia (RUS); Tatyana Chebykina; Svetlana Goncharenko; Olga Kotlyarova; Tatyana Alekseyeva	3:26.84 WR	United States (USA); Shanelle Porter; Natasha Kaiser-Brown; Anita Howard; Jearl Miles Clark	3:27.66 AR	Germany (GER); Anja Rücker; Anke Feller; Heike Meissner; Grit Breuer	3:28.39
1999	Russia (RUS); Tatyana Chebykina; Svetlana Goncharenko; Olga Kotlyarova; Natalya Nazarova	3:24.25 WR	Australia (AUS); Susan Andrews; Tania Van Heer; Tamsyn Lewis; Cathy Freeman	3:26.87 AR	United States (USA); Monique Hennagan; Michelle Collins; Zundra Feagin; Shanelle Porter	3:27.59 AR
2001	Russia (RUS); Yuliya Nosova; Olesya Zykina; Yuliya Sotnikova; Olga Kotlyarova	3:30.00 WL	Jamaica (JAM); Charmaine Howell; Juliet Campbell; Catherine Scott; Sandie Richards	3:30.79	Germany (GER); Claudia Marx; Birgit Rockmeier; Florence Ekpo-Umoh; Shanta Ghosh	3:31.00
2003	Russia (RUS); Natalya Antyukh; Yuliya Pechonkina; Olesya Zykina; Natalya Nazarova	3:28.45 WL	Jamaica (JAM); Ronetta Smith; Catherine Scott; Sheryl Morgan; Sandie Richards	3:31.23	United States (USA); Monique Hennagan; Meghan Addy; Brenda Taylor; Mary Danner	3:31.69
2004	Russia (RUS); Olesya Krasnomovets; Olga Kotlyarova; Tatyana Levina; Natalya Nazarova	3:23.88 WR	Belarus (BLR); Natalya Sologub; Anna Kozak; Ilona Usovich; Svetlana Usovich	3:29.96 NR	Romania (ROU); Angela Moroșanu; Alina Rîpanu; Maria Rus; Ionela Târlea	3:30.06 NR
2006	Russia (RUS); Tatyana Levina; Natalya Nazarova; Olesya Krasnomovets; Natalya Antyukh; Yulia Gushchina*; Tatyana Veshkurova*	3:24.91	United States (USA); Debbie Dunn; Tiffany Williams; Monica Hargrove; Mary Danner; Kia Davis*	3:28.63 SB	Belarus (BLR); Natallia Solohub; Anna Kozak; Yulyana Zhalniaruk; Ilona Usovich	3:28.65
2008	Russia (RUS); Yuliya Gushchina; Tatyana Levina; Natalya Nazarova; Olesya Zykina	3:28.17 WL	Belarus (BLR); Anna Kozak; Iryna Khliustava; Sviatlana Usovich; Ilona Usovich	3:28.90 SB	United States (USA); Angel Perkins; Miriam Barnes; Shareese Woods; Moushaumi Robinson	3:29.30 SB
2010	United States (USA); Debbie Dunn; DeeDee Trotter; Natasha Hastings; Allyson Felix	3:27.34 WL	Czech Republic (CZE); Denisa Rosolová; Jitka Bartoničková; Zuzana Bergrová; Zuzana Hejnová	3:30.05 SB	Great Britain (GBR); Kim Wall; Vicki Barr; Perri Shakes-Drayton; Lee McConnell	3:30.29 SB
2012	Great Britain (GBR); Shana Cox; Nicola Sanders; Christine Ohuruogu; Perri Shakes-Drayton	3:28.76 WL	United States (USA); Leslie Cole; Natasha Hastings; Jernail Hayes; Sanya Richards-Ross	3:28.79 SB	Romania (ROU); Angela Moroșanu; Alina Panainte; Adelina Pastor; Elena Mirela Lavric	3:33.41 SB
2014	United States (USA); Natasha Hastings; Joanna Atkins; Francena McCorory; Cassandra Tate; Jernail Hayes*; Monica Hargrove*	3:24.83 WL	Jamaica (JAM); Patricia Hall; Anneisha McLaughlin; Kaliese Spencer; Stephenie Ann McPherson; Verone Chambers*; Natoya Goule*	3:26.54 NR	Great Britain (GBR); Eilidh Child; Shana Cox; Margaret Adeoye; Christine Ohuruogu; Victoria Ohuruogu*	3:27.90 SB
2016	United States (USA); Natasha Hastings; Quanera Hayes; Courtney Okolo; Ashley Spencer	3:26.38 WL	Poland (POL); Ewelina Ptak; Małgorzata Hołub; Magdalena Gorzkowska; Justyna Święty	3:31.15 SB	Romania (ROU); Adelina Pastor; Elena Mirela Lavric; Andrea Miklós; Bianca Răzor	3:31.51 SB
2018	United States (USA); Quanera Hayes; Georganne Moline; Shakima Wimbley; Courtney Okolo; Joanna Atkins*; Raevyn Rogers*	3:23.85 CR	Poland (POL); Justyna Święty-Ersetic; Patrycja Wyciszkiewicz; Aleksandra Gaworska; Małgorzata Hołub-Kowalik; Joanna Linkiewicz*; Natalia Kaczmarek*	3:26.09 NR	Great Britain (GBR); Meghan Beesley; Hannah Williams; Amy Allcock; Zoey Clark; Anyika Onuora*	3:29.38 SB
2022	Jamaica (JAM); Junelle Bromfield; Janieve Russell; Roneisha McGregor; Stephenie Ann McPherson; Tiffany James*	3:28.40 SB	Netherlands (NED); Lieke Klaver; Eveline Saalberg; Lisanne de Witte; Femke Bol; Andrea Bouma*	3:28.57 SB	Poland (POL); Natalia Kaczmarek; Iga Baumgart-Witan; Kinga Gacka; Justyna Święty-Ersetic; Aleksandra Gaworska*	3:28.59 SB
2024	Netherlands (NED); Lieke Klaver; Cathelijn Peeters; Lisanne de Witte; Femke Bol; Myrte van der Schoot*; Eveline Saalberg*	3:25.07 NR	United States (USA); Quanera Hayes; Talitha Diggs; Bailey Lear; Alexis Holmes; Jessica Wright*; Na'Asha Robinson*	3:25.34 SB	Great Britain (GBR); Laviai Nielsen; Lina Nielsen; Ama Pipi; Jessie Knight; Hannah Kelly*	3:26.36 NR
2025	United States; Quanera Hayes; Bailey Lear; Rosey Effiong; Alexis Holmes	3:27.45	Poland; Justyna Święty-Ersetic; Aleksandra Formella; Anastazja Kuś; Anna Gryc	3:32.05 SB	Australia; Ellie Beer; Ella Connolly; Bella Pasquali; Jemma Pollard	3:32.65 SB
2026	United States; Bailey Lear; Rosey Effiong; Paris Peoples; Shamier Little; Abbey Glynn*; Brianna White*	3:25.81 SB	Netherlands; Lieke Klaver; Myrte van der Schoot; Nina Franke; Eveline Saalberg; Madelief van Leur*; Elisabeth Paulina*	3:26.00 SB	Spain; Paula Sevilla; Ana Prieto; Rocio Arroyo; Blanca Hervas; Carmen Avilés*; Daniela Fra*	3:26.04 SB

=== High jump ===
Championships	Gold		Silver		Bronze	
1987	Stefka Kostadinova; Bulgaria	2.05 WR	Susanne Beyer; East Germany	2.02 NR	Emilia Dragieva; Bulgaria	2.00 PB
1989	Stefka Kostadinova; Bulgaria	2.02	Tamara Bykova; Soviet Union	2.00	Heike Henkel; West Germany	1.94
1991	Heike Henkel; Germany	2.00	Tamara Bykova; Soviet Union	1.97	Heike Balck; Germany	1.94
1993	Stefka Kostadinova; Bulgaria	2.02	Heike Henkel; Germany	2.02	Inha Babakova; Ukraine	2.00
1995	Alina Astafei; Germany	2.01	Britta Bilač; Slovenia	1.99	Heike Henkel; Germany	1.99
1997	Stefka Kostadinova; Bulgaria	2.02 WL	Inha Babakova; Ukraine	2.00	Hanne Haugland; Norway	2.00
1999	Khristina Kalcheva; Bulgaria	1.99 PB	Zuzana Hlavonová; Czech Republic	1.96	Tisha Waller; United States	1.96 SB
2001	Kajsa Bergqvist; Sweden	2.00 WL	Inha Babakova; Ukraine	2.00 WL	Venelina Veneva-Mateeva; Bulgaria	1.96
2003	Kajsa Bergqvist; Sweden	2.01	Yelena Yelesina; Russia	1.99	Anna Chicherova; Russia	1.99
2004	Elena Slesarenko; Russia	2.04 WL	Anna Chicherova; Russia	2.00	Blanka Vlašić; Croatia	1.97
2006	Elena Slesarenko; Russia	2.02 SB	Blanka Vlašić; Croatia	2.00	Ruth Beitia; Spain	1.98 SB
2008	Blanka Vlašić; Croatia	2.03	Elena Slesarenko; Russia	2.01	Vita Palamar; Ukraine	2.01 NR
2010	Blanka Vlašić; Croatia	2.00	Ruth Beitia; Spain	1.98	Chaunté Lowe; United States	1.98 SB
2012	Chaunté Lowe; United States	1.98	Antonietta Di Martino; Italy	1.95 SB	Ebba Jungmark; Sweden	1.95 SB
2014	Maria Kuchina; Russia	2.00	Kamila Lićwinko; Poland	2.00 NIR	Ruth Beitia; Spain	2.00 SB
2016	Vashti Cunningham; United States	1.96	Ruth Beitia; Spain	1.96	Kamila Lićwinko; Poland	1.96
2018	Mariya Lasitskene; Authorised Neutral Athletes	2.01	Vashti Cunningham; United States	1.93	Alessia Trost; Italy	1.93 SB
2022	Yaroslava Mahuchikh; Ukraine	2.02 m WL	Eleanor Patterson; Australia	2.00 m AR	Nadezhda Dubovitskaya; Kazakhstan	1.98 m AR
2024	Nicola Olyslagers; Australia	1.99 m	Yaroslava Mahuchikh; Ukraine	1.97 m	Lia Apostolovski; Slovenia	1.95 m PB
2025	Nicola Olyslagers; Australia	1.97 m SB	Eleanor Patterson; Australia	1.97 m	Yaroslava Mahuchikh; Ukraine	1.95 m
2026	Yaroslava Mahuchikh; Ukraine	2.01 m	Angelina Topić; Serbia Nicola Olyslagers; Australia Yuliya Levchenko; Ukraine	1.99 m	Not awarded	

=== Pole vault ===
Championships	Gold		Silver		Bronze	
1997	Stacy Dragila; United States	4.40	Emma George; Australia	4.35	Weiyan Cai; China	4.35 AR
1999	Nastja Ryjikh-Reiberger; Germany	4.50 CR	Vala Flosadóttir; Iceland	4.45 NR	Nicole Humbert; Germany	4.35
2001	Pavla Rybová; Czech Republic	4.56 CR	Svetlana Feofanova; Russia	4.51	Kellie Suttle; United States	4.51
2003	Svetlana Feofanova; Russia	4.80 WR	Elena Isinbaeva; Russia	4.60	Monika Pyrek; Poland	4.45
2004	Elena Isinbaeva; Russia	4.86 WR	Stacy Dragila; United States	4.81 AR	Svetlana Feofanova; Russia	4.70
2006	Elena Isinbaeva; Russia	4.80	Anna Rogowska; Poland	4.75	Svetlana Feofanova; Russia	4.70 SB
2008	Elena Isinbaeva; Russia	4.75	Jennifer Suhr; United States	4.75 PB	Monika Pyrek; Poland	4.70 SB
2010	Fabiana Murer; Brazil	4.80	Svetlana Feofanova; Russia	4.80 SB	Anna Rogowska; Poland	4.70
2012	Elena Isinbaeva; Russia	4.80	Vanessa Boslak; France	4.70 NR	Holly Bleasdale; Great Britain	4.70
2014	Yarisley Silva; Cuba	4.70 SB	Anzhelika Sidorova; Russia	4.70	Jirina Svobodová; Czech Republic	4.70
2016	Jennifer Suhr; United States	4.90 CR	Sandi Morris; United States	4.85	Ekateríni Stefanídi; Greece	4.80
2018	Sandi Morris; United States	4.95 CR	Anzhelika Sidorova; Authorised Neutral Athletes	4.90 PB	Katerina Stefanidi; Greece	4.80
2022	Sandi Morris; United States	4.80 m SB	Katie Nageotte; United States	4.75 m	Tina Šutej; Slovenia	4.75 m
2024	Molly Caudery; Great Britain	4.80 m	Eliza McCartney; New Zealand	4.80 m	Katie Moon; United States	4.75 m
2025	Marie-Julie Bonnin; France	4.75 m =NR	Tina Šutej; Slovenia	4.70 m	Angelica Moser; Switzerland	4.70 m
2026	Molly Caudery; Great Britain	4.85 m SB	Tina Šutej; Slovenia	4.80 m SB	Amálie Švábíková; Czech Republic Imogen Ayris; New Zealand Angelica Moser; Switzerland	4.70 m

=== Long jump ===
Championships	Gold		Silver		Bronze	
1987	Heike Drechsler; East Germany	7.10	Helga Radtke; East Germany	6.94	Yelena Belevskaya; Soviet Union	6.76
1989	Galina Chistyakova; Soviet Union	6.98	Marieta Ilcu; Romania	6.86	Larisa Berezhnaya; Soviet Union	6.82
1991	Larisa Berezhnaya; Soviet Union	6.84	Heike Drechsler; Germany	6.82	Marieta Ilcu; Romania	6.74
1993	Marieta Ilcu; Romania	6.84	Susen Tiedtke; Germany	6.84 PB	Inessa Kravets; Ukraine	6.77
1995	Lyudmila Galkina; Russia	6.95 PB	Irina Mushailova; Russia	6.90 PB	Susen Tiedtke; Germany	6.90 PB
1997	Fiona May; Italy	6.86 Q NR	Chioma Ajunwa; Nigeria	6.80 Q	Agata Karczmarek; Poland	6.71 Q PB
1999	Tatyana Kotova; Russia	6.86 PB	Shana Williams; United States	6.82 PB	Iva Prandzheva; Bulgaria	6.78
2001	Dawn Burrell-Campbell; United States	7.03 WL	Tatyana Kotova; Russia	6.98 SB	Niurka Montalvo; Spain	6.88 NR
2003	Tatyana Kotova; Russia	6.84 WL	Inessa Kravets; Ukraine	6.72	Maurren Higa Maggi; Brazil	6.70 AR
2004	Tatyana Lebedeva; Russia	6.98 WL	Tatyana Kotova; Russia	6.93 SB	Carolina Klüft; Sweden	6.92 NR
2006	Tianna Madison Bartoletta; United States	6.80 PB	Naide Gomes; Portugal	6.76 NR	Concepción Montaner; Spain	6.76 SB
2008	Naide Gomes; Portugal	7.00 WL	Maurren Higa Maggi; Brazil	6.89 AR	Irina Meleshina; Russia	6.88
2010	Brittney Reese; United States	6.70	Naide Gomes; Portugal	6.67	Keila Costa; Brazil	6.63 SB
2012	Brittney Reese; United States	7.23 CR	Janay DeLoach Soukup; United States	6.98 SB	Shara Proctor; Great Britain	6.89 NR
2014	Éloyse Lesueur; France	6.85	Katarina Johnson-Thompson; Great Britain	6.81 PB	Ivana Španovic; Serbia	6.77
2016	Brittney Reese; United States	7.22 WL	Ivana Španovic; Serbia	7.07 NIR	Lorraine Ugen; Great Britain	6.93 NIR
2018	Ivana Španović; Serbia	6.96 WL	Brittney Reese; United States	6.89 SB	Sosthene Moguenara-Taroum; Germany	6.85 SB
2022	Ivana Vuleta; Serbia	7.06 m WL	Ese Brume; Nigeria	6.85 m SB	Lorraine Ugen; Great Britain	6.82 m SB
2024	Tara Davis-Woodhall; United States	7.07 m	Monae' Nichols; United States	6.85 m SB	Fátima Diame; Spain	6.78 m SB
2025	Claire Bryant; United States	6.96 m PB	Annik Kälin; Switzerland	6.83 m	Fátima Diame; Spain	6.72 m
2026	Agate de Sousa; Portugal	6.92 m	Larissa Iapichino; Italy	6.87 m	Natalia Linares; Colombia	6.80 m NR

=== Triple jump ===
Championships	Gold		Silver		Bronze	
1991	Inessa Kravets; Soviet Union	14.44 WR	Huirong Li; China	13.98	Sofiya Bozhanova; Bulgaria	13.62 NR
1993	Inessa Kravets; Ukraine	14.47 WR	Iolanda Chen; Russia	14.36	Inna Lasovskaya; Russia	14.35
1995	Iolanda Chen; Russia	15.03 WR	Iva Prandzheva; Bulgaria	14.71 NR	Ruiping Ren; China	14.37 AR
1997	Inna Lasovskaya; Russia	15.01 WL	Ashia Hansen; Great Britain	14.70 NR	Šárka Kašpárková; Czech Republic	14.66 NR
1999	Ashia Hansen; Great Britain	15.02 WL	Iva Prandzheva; Bulgaria	14.94 NR	Šárka Kašpárková; Czech Republic	14.87 NR
2001	Tereza Marinova; Bulgaria	14.91 PB	Tatyana Lebedeva; Russia	14.85	Tiombe Hurd; United States	14.19 PB
2003	Ashia Hansen; Great Britain	15.01 WL	Françoise Mbango Etone; Cameroon	14.88 AR	Kéné Ndoye; Senegal	14.72 NR
2004	Tatyana Lebedeva; Russia	15.36 WR	Yamilé Aldama; Sudan	14.90 AR	Hrysopiyí Devetzí; Greece	14.73
2006	Tatyana Lebedeva; Russia	14.95 WL	Anna Pyatykh; Russia	14.93 PB	Yamilé Aldama; Sudan	14.86 SB
2008	Yargelis Savigne; Cuba	15.05 AR	Marija Šestak; Slovenia	14.68	Olga Rypakova; Kazakhstan	14.58 AR
2010	Olga Rypakova; Kazakhstan	15.14 WL	Yargelis Savigne; Cuba	14.86 SB	Anna Pyatykh; Russia	14.64 SB
2012	Yamilé Aldama; Great Britain	14.82 SB	Olga Rypakova; Kazakhstan	14.63	Mabel Gay; Cuba	14.29
2014	Ekaterina Koneva; Russia	14.46	Olga Saladukha; Ukraine	14.45	Kimberly Williams; Jamaica	14.39 SB
2016	Yulimar Rojas; Venezuela	14.41	Kristin Gierisch; Germany	14.30 SB	Paraskeví Papahrístou; Greece	14.15
2018	Yulimar Rojas; Venezuela	14.63 WL	Kimberly Williams; Jamaica	14.48 PB	Ana Peleteiro; Spain	14.40 PB
2022	Yulimar Rojas; Venezuela	15.74 m WR	Maryna Bekh-Romanchuk; Ukraine	14.74 m PB	Kimberly Williams; Jamaica	14.62 m SB
2024	Thea Lafond; Dominica	15.01 m WL, NR	Leyanis Pérez; Cuba	14.90 m SB	Ana Peleteiro; Spain	14.75 m NR
2025	Leyanis Pérez Hernández; Cuba	14.93 m WL	Liadagmis Povea; Cuba	14.57 m =SB	Ana Peleteiro-Compaoré; Spain	14.29 m
2026	Leyanis Pérez; Cuba	14.95 m =WL	Yulimar Rojas; Venezuela	14.86 m	Saly Sarr; Senegal	14.70 m PB

=== Shot put ===
Championships	Gold		Silver		Bronze	
1987	Natalya Lisovskaya; Soviet Union	20.52	Ilona Briesenick; East Germany	20.28	Claudia Losch; West Germany	20.14
1989	Claudia Losch; West Germany	20.45	Zhihong Huang; China	20.25 PB	Christa Wiese; East Germany	19.75
1991	Xinmei Sui; China	20.54 CR	Zhihong Huang; China	20.33 PB	Natalya Lisovskaya; Soviet Union	20.00
1993	Svetlana Krivelyova; Russia	19.57	Stephanie Storp; Germany	19.37	Liuhong Zhang; China	19.32
1995	Kathrin Neimke; Germany	19.40	Connie Price-Smith; United States	19.12 PB	Grit Haupt-Hammer; Germany	19.02
1997	Vita Pavlysh; Ukraine	20.00 Q	Astrid Kumbernuss; Germany	19.92 Q	Irina Korzhanenko; Russia	19.49 Q PB
1999	Svetlana Krivelyova; Russia	19.08	Krystyna Zabawska; Poland	19.00	Teri Steer; United States	18.86
2001	Larisa Peleshenko; Russia	19.84	Nadzeya Ostapchuk; Belarus	19.24 PB	Svetlana Krivelyova; Russia	19.18
2003	Irina Korzhanenko; Russia	20.55 CR	Nadzeya Ostapchuk; Belarus	20.31	Astrid Kumbernuss; Germany	19.86 SB
2004	Svetlana Krivelyova; Russia	19.90 SB	Yumileidi Cumbá; Cuba	19.31 SB	Nadine Kleinert; Germany	19.05 SB
2006	Natallia Mikhnevich; Belarus	19.84 PB	Nadine Kleinert; Germany	19.64 PB	Olga Ryabinkina; Russia	19.24 SB
2008	Valerie Adams; New Zealand	20.19 AR	Meiju Li; China	19.09 PB	Misleydis González; Cuba	18.75 PB
2010	Valerie Adams; New Zealand	20.49 AR	Anna Avdeeva; Russia	19.47 SB	Nadine Kleinert; Germany	19.34 SB
2012	Valerie Adams; New Zealand	20.54 AR	Michelle Carter; United States	19.58 SB	Jillian Camarena-Williams; United States	19.44
2014	Valerie Adams; New Zealand	20.67 WL	Christina Schwanitz; Germany	19.94	Lijiao Gong; China	19.24 SB
2016	Michelle Carter; United States	20.21 WL	Anita Márton; Hungary	19.33 NIR	Valerie Adams; New Zealand	19.25
2018	Anita Márton; Hungary	19.62 WL	Danniel Thomas-Dodd; Jamaica	19.22 NIR	Lijiao Gong; China	19.08 SB
2022	Auriol Dongmo; Portugal	20.43 m WL	Chase Ealey; United States	20.21 m AR	Jessica Schilder; Netherlands	19.48 m
2024	Sarah Mitton; Canada	20.22 m SB	Yemisi Ogunleye; Germany	20.19 m PB	Chase Jackson; United States	19.67 m
2025	Sarah Mitton; Canada	20.48 m	Jessica Schilder; Netherlands	20.07 m	Chase Jackson; United States	20.06 m
2026	Chase Jackson; United States	20.14 m	Sarah Mitton; Canada	19.78 m	Axelina Johansson; Sweden	19.75 m NR

=== Pentathlon ===
Championships	Gold		Silver		Bronze	
1993	Liliana Alexandru; Romania	4686	Urszula Włodarczyk; Poland	4667 NR	Birgit Clarius; Germany	4641 PB
1995	Svetlana Moskalets; Russia	4834 CR	Kym Carter; United States	4632 NR	Irina Tyukhay; Russia	4622
1997	Sabine Braun; Germany	4780 WL	Mona Steigauf; Germany	4681 PB	Kym Carter; United States	4627
1999	Le Shundra Nathan; United States	4753 WL	Irina Belova; Russia	4691	Urszula Włodarczyk; Poland	4596
2001	Natallia Sazanovich; Belarus	4850 CR	Elena Prokhorova; Russia	4711 PB	Karin Ertl; Germany	4678 PB
2003	Carolina Klüft; Sweden	4933 CR	Natallia Sazanovich; Belarus	4715	Marie Collonvillé; France	4644 NR
2004	Naide Gomes; Portugal	4759 WL	Natallia Dobrynska; Ukraine	4727 NR	Austra Skujytė; Lithuania	4679 NR
2006	Lyudmyla Blonska; Ukraine	4685 PB	Karin Ruckstuhl; Netherlands	4607	Olga Levenkova; Russia	4579
2008	Tia Hellebaut; Belgium	4867 WL	Kelly Sotherton; Great Britain	4852 SB	Anna Bogdanova; Russia	4753
2010	Jessica Ennis-Hill; Great Britain	4937 CR	Natallia Dobrynska; Ukraine	4851 NR	Hyleas Fountain; United States	4753 AR
2012	Natallia Dobrynska; Ukraine	5013 WR	Jessica Ennis-Hill; Great Britain	4965 NR	Austra Skujytė; Lithuania	4802 NR
2014	Nadine Broersen; Netherlands	4830 WL	Brianne Theisen Eaton; Canada	4768 NIR	Alina Fodorova; Ukraine	4724 PB
2016	Brianne Theisen Eaton; Canada	4881 WL	Alina Fodorova; Ukraine	4770	Barbara Nwaba; United States	4661
2018	Katarina Johnson-Thompson; Great Britain	4750 SB	Ivona Dadic; Austria	4700 SB	Yorgelis Rodríguez; Cuba	4637 NIR
2022	Noor Vidts; Belgium	4929 pts WL	Adrianna Sułek; Poland	4851 pts NR	Kendell Williams; United States	4680 pts SB
2024	Noor Vidts; Belgium	4773 pts WL	Saga Vanninen; Finland	4677 pts NR	Sofie Dokter; Netherlands	4571 pts SB
2025	Saga Vanninen; Finland	4821 pts	Kate O'Connor; Ireland	4742 pts	Taliyah Brooks; United States	4669 pts PB
2026	Sofie Dokter; Netherlands	4888 WL	Anna Hall; United States	4860 SB	Kate O'Connor; Ireland	4839 NR

== Discontinued events ==
=== 200 metres ===
Championships	Gold		Silver		Bronze	
1987	Heike Drechsler; East Germany	22.27 WR	Merlene Ottey; Jamaica	22.66 AR	Grace Jackson; Jamaica	23.21
1989	Merlene Ottey; Jamaica	22.34 AR	Grace Jackson; Jamaica	22.95 PB	Natalya Kovtun; Soviet Union	23.28
1991	Merlene Ottey; Jamaica	22.24	Irina Privalova; Soviet Union	22.41 NR	Grit Breuer; Germany	22.58 WJ
1993	Irina Privalova; Russia	22.15 CR	Melinda Gainsford-Taylor; Australia	22.73 AR	Natalya Pomoshchnikova-Voronova; Russia	22.90
1995	Melinda Gainsford-Taylor; Australia	22.64	Pauline Davis-Thompson; Bahamas	22.68 NR	Natalya Pomoshchnikova-Voronova; Russia	23.01
1997	Ekateríni Kóffa; Greece	22.76 NR	Juliet Cuthbert; Jamaica	22.77	Svetlana Goncharenko; Russia	22.85
1999	Ionela Târlea; Romania	22.39 WL	Svetlana Goncharenko; Russia	22.69 SB	Pauline Davis-Thompson; Bahamas	22.70 SB
2001	Juliet Campbell; Jamaica	22.64 WL	LaTasha Jenkins; United States	22.96 PB	Natallia Safronnikava; Belarus	23.17
2003	Muriel Hurtis; France	22.54	Anastasiya Kapachinskaya; Russia	22.80	Juliet Campbell; Jamaica	22.81 SB
2004	Natallia Safronnikava; Belarus	23.13	Svetlana Goncharenko; Russia	23.15	Karin Mayr-Krifka; Austria	23.18

=== 3000 metres walk ===
Championships	Gold		Silver		Bronze	
1987	Olga Krishtop; Soviet Union	12:05.49 WR	Giuliana Salce; Italy	12:36.76	Ann Peel; Canada	12:38.97 AR
1989	Kerry Saxby-Junna; Australia	12:01.65 WR	Beate Gummelt; East Germany	12:07.73	Ileana Salvador; Italy	12:11.33 NR
1991	Beate Gummelt; Germany	11:50.90 WR	Kerry Saxby-Junna; Australia	12:03.21	Ileana Salvador; Italy	12:07.67 NR
1993	Yelena Nikolayeva; Russia	11:49.73 CR	Kerry Saxby-Junna; Australia	11:53.82 AR	Ileana Salvador; Italy	11:55.35
