= 2026 World Athletics Indoor Championships – Women's 400 metres =

Women's 400 metres at the 2026 World Athletics Indoor Championships
- Venue: Kujawsko-Pomorska Arena Toruń
- Location: Toruń, Poland
- Dates: 20 March (round 1 & semi-finals); 21 March (final)
- Winning time: 50.76

Medalists
gold medal	Lurdes Gloria Manuel	Czech Republic
silver medal	Natalia Bukowiecka	Poland
bronze medal	Lieke Klaver	Netherlands

The women's 400 metres at the 2026 World Athletics Indoor Championships took place on the short track of the Kujawsko-Pomorska Arena Toruń in Toruń, Poland, on 20 and 21 March 2026. This was the 22nd time the event was contested at the World Athletics Indoor Championships. Athletes could qualify by achieving the entry standard or by their World Athletics Ranking in the event.

== Background ==
The women's 400 metres was contested 21 times before 2026, at every previous edition of the World Athletics Indoor Championships.

Records before the 2026 World Athletics Indoor Championships
Record	Athlete (nation)	Time (s)	Location	Date
World record	Femke Bol (NED)	49.17	Glasgow, United Kingdom	2 March 2024
Championship record	Femke Bol (NED)	49.17	Glasgow, United Kingdom	2 March 2024
2026 World Lead	Ella Onojuvwevwo (NGR)	50.28	Fayetteville, United States	13 March 2026

== Qualification ==
For the women's 400 metres, the qualification period ran from 1 November 2025 until 8 March 2026. Athletes could qualify by achieving the entry standard of 51.75 s. Athletes could also qualify by virtue of their World Athletics Ranking for the event or by virtue of their World Athletics Indoor Tour wildcard. There is a target number of 30 athletes.

== Results ==
=== Round 1 ===
Round 1 was held on 20 March, starting at 11:08 (UTC+1) in the morning. First 2 of each heat (Q) plus 2 fastest times (q) qualify to Semi-Final.

==== Heat 1 ====
Place	Lane	Athlete	Nation	Time	Notes
1	5	Lieke Klaver	Netherlands	51.48	Q
2	3	Bassant Hemida	Egypt	52.13	Q
3	4	Alessandra Bonora	Italy	52.20	PB
4	6	Yemi Mary John	Great Britain	52.28	

==== Heat 2 ====
Place	Lane	Athlete	Nation	Time	Notes
1	3	Sofia Lavreshina	Portugal	51.87	Q, NR
2	5	Myrte van der Schoot	Netherlands	51.97	Q
3	6	Rosey Effiong	United States	52.13	
4	4	Annalies Kalma	New Zealand	53.03	

==== Heat 3 ====
Place	Lane	Athlete	Nation	Time	Notes
1	6	Blanca Hervás	Spain	52.15	Q
2	5	Zoe Sherar	Canada	52.16 [.153]	Q
3	3	Lada Vondrová	Czech Republic	52.16 [.155]	
4	4	Louisa Stoney	Great Britain	52.24	

==== Heat 4 ====
Place	Lane	Athlete	Nation	Time	Notes
1	6	Natalia Bukowiecka	Poland	51.60	Q
2	3	Paula Sevilla	Spain	51.86	Q
3	5	Bailey Lear	United States	51.87	q
4	4	Veronika Drljačić	Croatia	52.53	

==== Heat 5 ====
Place	Lane	Athlete	Nation	Time	Notes
1	6	Mette Baas	Finland	51.42	Q, NR
2	5	Emma Zapletalová	Slovakia	51.70	Q
3	4	Wadeline Venlogh	Haiti	51.80	q
4	3	Emma Cannon	Canada	52.57	
5	2	De Cassia Ferreira	Brazil	55.50	PB

==== Heat 6 ====
Place	Lane	Athlete	Nation	Time	Notes
1	6	Lurdes Gloria Manuel	Czech Republic	51.08	Q
2	5	Mercy Oketch	Kenya	51.57	Q
3	3	Justyna Święty-Ersetic	Poland	52.15	
4	4	Daniela Ledecká	Slovakia	53.13	

==== Heat 7 ====
Place	Lane	Athlete	Nation	Time	Notes
1	5	Henriette Jæger	Norway	52.29	Q
2	6	Amandine Brossier	France	52.30	Q
3	3	Helena Ponette	Belgium	52.34	
4	2	Caitlyn Bobb	Bermuda	54.15	SB
5	4	Julia Ribeiro	Brazil	54.35	PB

=== Semi-finals ===
The semi-finals were held on 20 March, starting at 19:42 (UTC+1) in the evening. First 1 of each heat (Q) plus 4 fastest times (q) qualify to Final.

==== Heat 1 ====
Place	Lane	Athlete	Nation	Time	Notes
1	6	Lurdes Gloria Manuel	Czech Republic	50.96	Q, PB
2	5	Mercy Oketch	Kenya	51.90	q
3	4	Bailey Lear	United States	52.07	
	3	Emma Zapletalová	Slovakia	DNS	

==== Heat 2 ====
Place	Lane	Athlete	Nation	Time	Notes
1	5	Natalia Bukowiecka	Poland	51.41	Q
2	3	Zoe Sherar	Canada	51.61	q
3	4	Myrte van der Schoot	Netherlands	52.15	
4	6	Sofia Lavreshina	Portugal	52.20	

==== Heat 3 ====
Place	Lane	Athlete	Nation	Time	Notes
1	6	Lieke Klaver	Netherlands	51.23	Q
2	5	Blanca Hervás	Spain	51.58	q
3	3	Amandine Brossier	France	52.71	
4	4	Bassant Hemida	Egypt	53.14	

==== Heat 4 ====
Place	Lane	Athlete	Nation	Time	Notes
1	5	Henriette Jæger	Norway	50.95	Q
2	3	Wadeline Venlogh	Haiti	52.04	q
3	4	Paula Sevilla	Spain	52.19	
4	6	Mette Baas	Finland	52.36	

=== Final ===
The final was held on 21 March, starting at 20:40 (UTC+1) in the evening.

Place	Heat	Lane	Athlete	Nation	Time	Notes
1st place, gold medalist(s)	2	5	Lurdes Gloria Manuel	Czech Republic	50.76	PB
2nd place, silver medalist(s)	1	5	Natalia Bukowiecka	Poland	50.83	NR
3rd place, bronze medalist(s)	1	6	Lieke Klaver	Netherlands	51.02	
4	2	3	Wadeline Venlogh	Haiti	51.07	NR
5	2	4	Mercy Oketch	Kenya	51.25	NR
6	1	4	Blanca Hervás	Spain	51.43	PB
7	2	6	Henriette Jæger	Norway	51.50	
8	1	3	Zoe Sherar	Canada	51.74	
