= 2026 World Athletics Indoor Championships – Women's 4 × 400 metres relay =

Women's 4 × 400 metres relay at the 2026 World Athletics Indoor Championships
- Venue: Kujawsko-Pomorska Arena Toruń
- Location: Toruń, Poland
- Dates: 22 March
- Winning time: 3:25.81

Medalists
gold medal	Bailey Lear; Rosey Effiong; Paris Peoples; Shamier Little; Abbey Glynn; Brianna White	United States
silver medal	Lieke Klaver; Myrte van der Schoot; Nina Franke; Eveline Saalberg; Madelief van Leur; Elisabeth Paulina	Netherlands
bronze medal	Paula Sevilla; Ana Prieto; Rocio Arroyo; Blanca Hervas; Carmen Avilés; Daniela Fra	Spain

The women's 4 × 400 metres relay at the 2026 World Athletics Indoor Championships took place on the short track of the Kujawsko-Pomorska Arena Toruń in Toruń, Poland, on 22 March 2026. This was the 19th time the event was contested at the World Athletics Indoor Championships.

== Background ==
The women's 4 × 400 metres relay was contested 18 times before 2025, at every edition of the World Athletics Indoor Championships since 1991.

Records before the 2026 World Athletics Indoor Championships
Record	Team	Time (s)	Location	Date
World record	Arkansas	3:21.75	Albuquerque, United States	11 March 2023
2026 World Lead	Arkansas	3:23.63	Fayetteville, United States	13 February 2026
Championship record	United States	3:23.85	Birmingham, United Kingdom	4 March 2018

== Qualification ==
For the women's 4 × 400 metres relay, there is no entry standard, and every Member Federation will be able to enter one team up to eight athletes in each event.

== Results ==
=== Round 1 ===
Round 1 was held on 22 March, starting at 12:05 (UTC+1) in the morning.

The first two teams in each heat (Q) and the next two fastest teams (q) advanced to the final.

Rank	Heat	Lane	Nation	Athletes	Time	Notes
1	1	5	Poland	Marika Popowicz-Drapała, Anna Gryc, Anastazja Kuś, Justyna Święty-Ersetic	3:28.06	Q, SB
2	1	6	Netherlands	Lieke Klaver, Madelief van Leur, Elisabeth Paulina, Eveline Saalberg	3:28.11	Q, SB
3	2	6	United States	Paris Peoples, Brianna White, Abbey Glynn, Shamier Little	3:28.36	Q
4	2	5	United Kingdom	Louisa Stoney, Jazmine Moss, Poppy Malik, Tess McHugh	3:29.31	Q, SB
5	1	4	Slovakia	Daniela Ledecká, Viktoria Korbová, Martina Segečová, Emma Zapletalová	3:29.87	q, NR
6	2	4	Spain	Ana Prieto, Carmen Avilés, Rocío Arroyo, Daniela Fra	3:29.98	q, SB
7	2	3	Portugal	Sofia Lavreshina, Fatoumata Binta Diallo, Clara Martinha, Carina Vanessa	3:31.37	NR
	1	3	Czech Republic	Kateřina Emilly Šmilauerová, Lurdes Gloria Manuel, Nikola Bisová, Lada Vondrová	DQ	

=== Final ===
The final was held on 22 March, starting at 20:47 (UTC+1) in the evening.

Rank	Lane	Nation	Athletes	Time	Notes
1st place, gold medalist(s)	5	United States	Bailey Lear, Rosey Effiong, Paris Peoples, Shamier Little	3:25.81	SB
2nd place, silver medalist(s)	4	Netherlands	Lieke Klaver, Myrte van der Schoot, Nina Franke, Eveline Saalberg	3:26.00	SB
3rd place, bronze medalist(s)	2	Spain	Paula Sevilla, Ana Prieto, Rocio Arroyo, Blanca Hervas	3:26.04	SB
4	6	Poland	Natalia Bukowiecka, Anna Gryc, Anastazja Kuś, Justyna Święty-Ersetic	3:26.17	SB
5	3	United Kingdom	Tess McHugh, Dina Asher-Smith, Louisa Stoney, Keely Hodgkinson	3:28.09	SB
6	1	Slovakia	Daniela Ledecká, Viktoria Korbová, Martina Segečová, Emma Zapletalová	3:32.77	
