= Charlie Carvell =

British athlete (born 2004)

Personal information
- Nationality: British (Welsh)
- Born: 30 June 2004 (age 22) Bridgnorth, Shropshire, England

Sport
- Sport: Athletics
- Event: 400 metres

Achievements and titles
- Personal best(s): 400m: 45.48 (Kladno, 2024)
Medal record
Men's athletics
Representing Great Britain
European U20 Championships
Silver medal – second place	2023 Jerusalem	400m
Gold medal – first place	2023 Jerusalem	4x400m relay
Gold medal – first place	2021 Tallinn	4x400m relay

Charlie Carvell (born 30 June 2004) is a British sprinter.

== Early life ==
From Shropshire, he attended Bridgnorth Endowed School and Thomas Telford School.

== Career ==
Carvell was a gold medallist at the 2021 European Athletics U20 Championships in the 4 × 400 m relay.

Carvell ran a personal best of 46.17 seconds win the 400m at the England Athletics Under-20 Championships at Chelmsford in June 2023. He was a silver medallist in the 400 metres at the 2023 European Athletics U20 Championships in a time of 46.08 seconds, having run a personal best of 45.92 seconds in the heats. At that event he was also a gold medallist in the 4 × 400 m relay. He was named the Athletics Weekly Under-20 British Male Athlete of the Year for 2023.

On 22 May 2024, he won the 400 metres at a meeting in Kladno with a personal best time of 45.48 seconds. In May 2024, he was also selected to represent Britain in the 4 × 400 m relay at the 2024 European Athletics Championships in Rome. He was part of the men's 4 × 400 m relay team which won their heat to qualify for the final, in which they finished seventh. In July, Carvell was named in the Great Britain 4x400 metres relay squad for the 2024 Summer Olympics but withdrew due to a hamstring injury. In November 2024, he was named by British Athletics on the Olympic Futures Programme for 2025. In October 2025, he was retained on the British Athletics Olympic Futures Programme for 2025/26.
