= 2023 European Athletics U20 Championships =

Sports competition in Jerusalem, Israel

- Organisers: European Athletics, Israeli Athletic Association
- Edition: 27th
- Dates: 7–10 August
- Host city: Jerusalem, Israel
- Venue: Givat Ram Stadium
- Level: Under 20
- Type: Outdoor
- Events: 44
- Participation: 1139 athletes from 44 nations
- Official website: European Athletics

The 2023 European Athletics U20 Championships are the twenty-seventh edition of the biennial athletics competition between European athletes under the age of twenty. The 2023 European Athletics U20 Championships are organized by European Athletics Association and held from 7–10 August 2023 in Jerusalem, Israel. Initially the competition was awarded to Cluj-Napoca, Romania but due to Cluj Arena not being fit for such championships, European Athletics decided to award the competition to Israel.

== Medal table ==
* Host nation (Israel)

Rank	Nation	Gold	Silver	Bronze	Total
1	Germany	8	8	7	23
2	Sweden	5	2	0	7
3	Czech Republic	3	1	4	8
4	Great Britain	2	4	4	10
5	Italy	2	3	2	7
5	Netherlands	2	3	2	7
7	Switzerland	2	3	1	6
8	Poland	2	2	1	5
9	Finland	2	2	0	4
10	Serbia	2	1	1	4
10	Ukraine	2	1	1	4
12	Latvia	2	0	0	2
12	Spain	2	0	0	2
14	France	1	2	4	7
15	Austria	1	2	2	5
16	Hungary	1	1	5	7
17	Turkey	1	1	2	4
18	Denmark	1	1	1	3
19	Cyprus	1	1	0	2
19	Estonia	1	1	0	2
19	Ireland	1	1	0	2
22	Bulgaria	0	3	1	4
23	Croatia	0	1	0	1
23	Lithuania	0	1	0	1
25	Greece	0	0	2	2
26	Portugal	0	0	1	1
26	Romania	0	0	1	1
26	Slovakia	0	0	1	1
Totals (28 entries)		44	45	43	132

== Medal summary ==
=== Men ===
==== Track ====
Chronology: 2019 | 2021 | 2023 | 2025 | 2027

Event	Gold		Silver		Bronze	
100 metres	Marek Zakrzewski; Poland	10.25 NU20R	Isak Hughes; Sweden	10.31	Sean Anyaogu; Great Britain	10.34
200 metres	Marek Zakrzewski; Poland	20.63 PB	Timo Spiering; Netherlands	20.97 PB	Daniele Groos; Italy	21.01 PB
400 metres	Jónas Gunnleivsson Isaksen; Denmark	45.86 NU20R	Charlie Carvell; Great Britain	46.08	Maksymilian Szwed; Poland	46.31
800 metres	Jakub Dudycha; Czech Republic	1:46.76	Ramon Wipfli; Switzerland	1:47.20	Thomas Marques de Andrade; France	1:47.29
1500 metres	Niels Laros; Netherlands	3:56.78	Kevin Kamenschak; Austria	3:59.73	Ondřej Gajdoš; Czech Republic	4:00.98
3000 metres	Jonathan Grahn; Sweden	8:44.67	Nick Griggs; Ireland	8:45.69	Bradley Giblin; Great Britain	8:47.26
5000 metres	Niels Laros; Netherlands	14:11.82	Jonathan Grahn; Sweden	14:12.73	Kevin Kamenschak; Austria	14:15.02
110 metres hurdles	Enzo Diessl; Austria	13.12	Rasmus Vehmaa; Finland	13.23 NU20R	Sisínio Ambriz; Portugal	13.29 NU20R
400 metres hurdles	Jere Haapalainen; Finland	50.02 NU20R	Antti Sainio; Finland	50.19 PB	Anouar Bourahla; France	50.33 PB
3000 metres steeplechase	Sergio del Barro; Spain	8:46.81	Pierre Boudy; France	8:47.04	Ferenc Soma Kovács; Hungary	8:47.50 PB
10 kilometres walk	Frederick Weigel; Germany	41:53.58 PB	Hayrettin Yıldız; Turkey	42:13.78 SB	Giuseppe Disabato; Italy	42:19.67 PB
4 × 100 metres relay	Jonathan Gou Gomez; Joël Csontos; Mathieu Chèvre; Manuel Gerber; Switzerland	39.87	Lorenzo Speear; Timo Spiering; Jozuah Revierre; Jamie Sesay; Netherlands	40.14	Milian Zirbus; Heiko Gussmann; Vincent Herbst; Ivo Ziebold; Germany	40.15
4 × 400 metres relay	Charlie Carvell; Jake Minshull; David Race; Sam Lunt; Great Britain	3:06.89 SB	Florian Kroll; Louis Quarata; Malik Skupin-Alfa; Elija Ziem; Germany	3:07.75 SB	Felix Levasseur; Milann Klemenic; Amaury Guillard; Allan Lacroix; France	3:07.97 SB
WR world record | AR area record | CR championship record | GR games record | NR national record | OR Olympic record | PB personal best | SB season best | WL world leading (in a given season)

* Indicates the athletes only competed in the preliminary heats and received medals.

==== Field ====
Chronology: 2019 | 2021 | 2023 | 2025 | 2027

Event	Gold		Silver		Bronze	
High jump	Melwin Lycke Holm; Sweden	2.18 =PB	Edoardo Stronati; Italy	2.18	Robert Ruffíni; Slovakia	2.15 PB
Pole vault	Simone Bertelli; Italy	5.40	Valentin Imsand; Switzerland	5.40	Erdem Tilki; Turkey	5.30 NU20R
Long jump	Mattia Furlani; Italy	8.23 CR	Bozhidar Sarâboyukov; Bulgaria	8.22 NU20R	Nikita Masliuk; Ukraine	7.97
Triple jump	Viktor Morozov; Estonia	16.45 EU20L	Bozhidar Sarâboyukov; Bulgaria	16.25 PB	Lâchezar Vâlchev; Bulgaria	16.16 PB
Shot put	Lasse Schulz; Germany	20.21	Lukas Schober; Germany	19.76	Dimitrios Antonatos; Greece	19.31 PB
Discus throw	Mykhailo Brudin; Ukraine	66.58 WU20L	Jan Svozil; Czech Republic	59.93	Yannick Rolvink; Netherlands	59.86 PB
Javelin throw	György Herczeg; Hungary	79.45	Max Dehning; Germany	78.07 SB	Michael Allison; Great Britain	72.44
Hammer throw	Max Lampinen; Finland	79.72 WU20L	Iosif Kesidis; Cyprus	77.73	Miklós Csekö; Hungary	76.87
WR world record | AR area record | CR championship record | GR games record | NR national record | OR Olympic record | PB personal best | SB season best | WL world leading (in a given season)

==== Combined ====
Chronology: 2019 | 2021 | 2023 | 2025 | 2027

Event	Gold		Silver		Bronze	
Decathlon	Amadeus Gräber; Germany	8209 WU20L	Matthias Lasch; Austria	8052 NU20R	Andrin Huber; Switzerland	8009 NU20R
WR world record | AR area record | CR championship record | GR games record | NR national record | OR Olympic record | PB personal best | SB season best | WL world leading (in a given season)

=== Women ===
==== Track ====
Chronology: 2019 | 2021 | 2023 | 2025 | 2027

Event	Gold		Silver		Bronze	
100 metres	Joy Eze; Great Britain	11.39	Renee Regis; Great Britain	11.40	Anna Luca Kocsis; Hungary	11.55
200 metres	Nora Lindahl; Sweden	23.26 PB	Alexa Sulyán; Hungary	23.26	Success Eduan; Great Britain	23.34
400 metres	Lurdes Gloria Manuel; Czech Republic	51.94	Alexe Deau; France	52.53 PB	Myrte van der Schoot; Netherlands	52.85 NU20R
800 metres	Audrey Werro; Switzerland	2:03.38	Abigail Ives; Great Britain	2:05.89	Dilek Koçak; Turkey	2:06.21
1500 metres	Dilek Koçak; Turkey	4:16.86 SB	Sofia Thøgersen; Denmark	4:17.08	Natálie Millerová; Czech Republic	4:18.92 PB
3000 metres	Agate Caune; Latvia	8:53.20	Zuzanna Wiernicka; Poland	9:21.40 NU18R	Sofia Benfares; Germany	9:25.42
5000 metres	Agate Caune; Latvia	15:03.85 CR	Kira Weis; Germany	15:50.36 PB	Sofia Thøgersen; Denmark	15:53.08
100 metres hurdles	Rosina Schneider; Germany	13.06 EU20L	Valérie Guignard; Switzerland	13.23 PB	Lia Flotow; Germany	13.32 =PB
400 metres hurdles	Moa Granat; Sweden	56.58	Olha Mashanienkova; Ukraine	56.83	Alexandra Stefania Ută; Romania	57.02
3000 metres steeplechase	Karolína Jarošová; Czech Republic	10:04.57 NU20R	Adia Budde; Germany	10:07.34	Vasiliki Kallimogianni; Greece	10:08.44 NU20R
10 kilometres walk	Sofia Santacreu; Spain	45:59.76 PB	Giulia Gabriele; Italy	46:56.73	Ana Delahaie; France	47:11.09 PB
4 × 100 metres relay	Nele Jaworski; Chelsea Kadiri; Rosina Schneider; Holly Okuku; Germany	43.82 EU20L	Renee Regis; Sophie Walton; Joy Eze; Success Eduan; Great Britain	43.82 SB	Hana Blažková; Terezie Táborská; Nikola Musilová; Adéla Tkáčová; Czech Republic	44.68 SB
4 × 400 metres relay	Alexe Deau; Méta Tumba; Maelle Maynier; Benedetta Kouakou; France	3:33.31 EU20L	Maud van Sintmaartensdijk; Britt de Blaauw; Madelief van Leur; Myrte van der Schoot; Netherlands	3:33.33 NU23R	Karolína Mitanová; Kateřina Matoušková; Terezie Táborská; Lurdes Gloria Manuel; Czech Republic	3:34.84 NU20R
WR world record | AR area record | CR championship record | GR games record | NR national record | OR Olympic record | PB personal best | SB season best | WL world leading (in a given season)

* Indicates the athletes only competed in the preliminary heats and received medals.

==== Field ====
Chronology: 2019 | 2021 | 2023 | 2025 | 2027

Event	Gold		Silver		Bronze	
High jump	Angelina Topić; Serbia	1.90	Elisabeth Pihela; Estonia	1.88	Joana Herrmann; Germany	1.86 PB
Pole vault	Sara Winberg; Sweden	4.25 PB	Rugilė Miklyčiūtė; Lithuania; Great Nnachi; Italy	4.15 NR 4.15	No medals awarded	
Long jump	Elizabeth Ndudi; Ireland	6.56 NU20R	Plamena Mitkova; Bulgaria	6.54 =SB	Laura Raquel Müller; Germany	6.51 PB
Triple jump	Oleksandra Chernukha; Ukraine	13.63 PB	Teodora Boberić; Serbia	13.50	Aleksandrija Mitrović; Serbia	13.40
Shot put	Nina Chioma Ndubuisi; Germany	17.97 WU20L	Zuzanna Maślana; Poland	16.90	Chantal Rimke; Germany	15.55 PB
Discus throw	Curly Brown; Germany	53.93 PB	Milina Wipiwé; Germany	53.83 PB	Lea Bork; Germany	53.46
Hammer throw	Valentina Savva; Cyprus	64.69	Jada Julien; Germany	62.92	Jázmin Csatári; Hungary	62.47
Javelin throw	Adriana Vilagoš; Serbia	58.38	Veronika Šokota; Croatia	55.41	Fanni Kövér; Hungary	53.09
WR world record | AR area record | CR championship record | GR games record | NR national record | OR Olympic record | PB personal best | SB season best | WL world leading (in a given season)

==== Combined ====
Chronology: 2019 | 2021 | 2023 | 2025 | 2027

Event	Gold		Silver		Bronze	
Heptathlon	Sandrina Sprengel; Germany	5928 pts	Pia Meßing; Germany	5790 pts	Sophie Kreiner; Austria	5698 pts PB
WR world record | AR area record | CR championship record | GR games record | NR national record | OR Olympic record | PB personal best | SB season best | WL world leading (in a given season)

== Entry standards ==
The qualification period runs from 1 January 2022 to 27 July 2023. A maximum of three athletes per member federation may participate in each individual event if they all have achieved the qualifying standard. Each member federation may enter one athlete in each individual event if their athletes have not achieved the qualifying standard for that event, but the total number of such athletes may not exceed two men and two women in total. The host country may enter one athlete in every discipline regardless of the entry standards.

Event	Men	Quota	Women	Rounds
100 metres	10.65	32	11.80	3
200 metres	21.60	32	24.30	3
400 metres	48.00	32	55.50	3
800 metres	1:50.25	24	2:07.80	2
1500 metres	3:48.20	24	4:24.00	2
5000 metres	14:35.00	25	17:10.00	1
3000 metres steeplechase	9:03.00	24	10:45.00	2
110/100 metres hurdles	14.20	32	13.95	3
400 metres hurdles	53.60	32	60.80	3
High jump	2.10 m (6 ft 10 1/2 in)	24	1.80 m (5 ft 10 3/4 in)	2
Pole vault	5.00 m (16 ft 4 3/4 in)	24	4.00 m (13 ft 1 1/4 in)	2
Long jump	7.40 m (24 ft 3 1/4 in)	24	6.15 m (20 ft 2 in)	2
Triple jump	15.05 m (49 ft 4 1/2 in)	24	12.70 m (41 ft 8 in)	2
Shot put	17.75 m (58 ft 2 3/4 in)	24	14.00 m (45 ft 11 in)	2
Discus throw	54.00 m (177 ft 1 3/4 in)	24	47.50 m (155 ft 10 in)	2
Hammer throw	67.00 m (219 ft 9 3/4 in)	24	57.00 m (187 ft 0 in)	2
Javelin throw	66.00 m (216 ft 6 1/4 in)	24	48.00 m (157 ft 5 3/4 in)	2
Decathlon/Heptathlon	7150	20	5350	1
10 kilometres race walk	46:00	25	51:15	1
4 × 100 metres relay		16		2
4 × 400 metres relay		16		2

== Participation ==
1,139 athletes (611 men and 528 women) from 44 nations are expected to participate in these championships.

- Albania (2)
- Armenia (3)
- Austria (14)
- Azerbaijan (1)
- Belgium (25)
- Bosnia and Herzegovina (3)
- Bulgaria (11)
- Croatia (17)
- Cyprus (15)
- Czech Republic (44)
- Denmark (11)
- Estonia (23)
- Finland (31)
- France (58)
- Germany (109)
- Great Britain (57)
- Greece (34)
- Hungary (33)
- Iceland (4)
- Ireland (35)
- Israel (11)
- Italy (93)
- Kosovo (2)
- Latvia (8)
- Lithuania (19)
- Luxembourg (3)
- Malta (2)
- Moldova (2)
- Montenegro (1)
- Netherlands (43)
- North Macedonia (1)
- Norway (29)
- Poland (70)
- Portugal (19)
- Romania (21)
- San Marino (1)
- Serbia (18)
- Slovakia (19)
- Slovenia (18)
- Spain (66)
- Sweden (48)
- Switzerland (45)
- Turkey (38)
- Ukraine (32)
