= Brianna White (sprinter) =

American sprinter (born 2002)

Personal information
- Born: 9 June 2002 (age 24)

Sport
- Country: United States
- Sport: Athletics
- Event: Sprint

Achievements and titles
- Personal bests: 400 m: 50.64 (Lexington, 2024)
Medal record
Women's athletics
Representing United States
World Indoor Championships
Gold medal – first place	2026 Toruń	4 × 400 m relay

Brianna White (born 9 June 2002) is an American sprinter. She represented the United States at the 2026 World Athletics Indoor Championships in the women's 4 × 400 metres relay.

== Biography ==
White attended Herbert H. Lehman High School in New York.

White attended the University of Tennessee. In 2024, she was part of the women' 4 × 400 metres flat team which won the Tennessee Vols first outdoor SEC relay title since 1987, with their time of 3:24.44 taking three seconds off the program's best time. That June, she was part of the Vols relay team which placed second at the 2024 NCAA Outdoor Championships in 3:23.32.

White was finalist in the 400 metres at the 2026 USA Indoor Track and Field Championships in New York, placing fifth overall and running 52.65 seconds in the final. She was subsequently selected for the United States relay teams at the 2026 World Athletics Indoor Championships in Toruń, Poland. She ran in the women's 4 × 400 metres heats alongside Abbey Glynn and Paris Peoples, with the team later winning the gold medal.
