= Marek Zakrzewski =

Polish athlete (born 2005)

Personal information
- Nationality: Polish
- Born: 18 December 2005 (age 20)

Sport
- Sport: Athletics
- Event: Sprint

Achievements and titles
- Personal best(s): 100 m: 10.25 (Jerusalem, 2023); 200 m: 20.50 (Bydgoszcz, 2024)
Medal record
Men's athletics
Representing Poland
European U20 Championships
Gold medal – first place	2023 Jerusalem	100 m
Gold medal – first place	2023 Jerusalem	200 m
European U18 Championships
Gold medal – first place	2022 Jerusalem	100 m

Marek Zakrzewski (born 18 December 2005) is a Polish track and field athlete who competes as a sprinter.

== Career ==
A product of the Young Athlete Academy in Słupsk, Zakrewski was selected to compete at the 2022 World Athletics U20 Championships in Cali, Colombia in August 2022, aged 16 years-old. Earlier that summer he won gold at the 2022 European Athletics U18 Championships in the 100 metres.

In 2023, Zakrzewski completed a double with gold medals in both the 100 metres and 200 metres at the 2023 European Athletics U20 Championships aged 17 years-old. He set a new personal best time of 10.25 seconds for the 100 metres. He set a new personal best of 23.64 in winning the 200 metres. He was the first man to do the sprint double in the competitions since Darren Campbell in 1991.

He was selected as part of the Polish 4 × 100 m team for the 2023 World Athletics Championships in Budapest in August 2023.

In January 2024, he beat the European U20 indoor 200 metres record, running 20.80 in Luxembourg. He ran as part of the Polish 4 × 100m relay team at the 2024 World Relays Championships in Nassau, Bahamas.

He competed at the 2025 World Athletics Relays in China in the Mixed 4 × 100 metres relay in May 2025.
