= Abbey Glynn =

American sprinter (born 2001)

Personal information
- Full name: Abigail Glynn
- Born: April 30, 2001 (age 25)

Sport
- Country: United States
- Sport: Athletics
- Events: Sprint, Hurdles

Achievements and titles
- Personal bests: 400 m: 51.77 (Lubbock, 2024); 400 mH: 55.31 (Boulder, 2024)
Medal record
Women's athletics
Representing United States
World Indoor Championships
Gold medal – first place	2026 Toruń	4 × 400 m relay

Abbey Glynn (born April 30, 2001) is an American sprinter and 400 metres hurdler. She represented the United States at the 2026 World Athletics Indoor Championships in the women's 4 × 400 metres relay.

== Biography ==
From Colorado, Glynn attended Mead High School where she won 800 metres medley relay titles in 2018 and 2019, as well as winning the individual Colorado state high school title in her final race, the 300 m hurdles prior to graduation in 2019. She then attended the University of Colorado.

Glynn placed eighth in the 400 metres hurdles final at the 2023 NCAA Outdoor Championships. The following year, at the 2024 Pac-12 Championships in Boulder, Glynn finished second in the 400 m hurdles with a time of 55.31 seconds to break her own school record. That June, she placed eighth again at the 2024 NCAA Outdoor Championships. She was a semi-finalist running 56.08 seconds in the 400 m hurdles at the US Olympic Trials later that month.

Glynn qualified for the final of the 400 metres hurdles at the 2025 USA Outdoor Track and Field Championships, placing seventh overall in 56.57 seconds. She was finalist in the 400 metres at the 2026 USA Indoor Track and Field Championships in New York, placing sixth overall and running 52.66 seconds in the final. She was subsequently selected for the United States relay teams at the 2026 World Athletics Indoor Championships in Toruń, Poland. She ran in the women’s 4 × 400 metres heats alongside Brianna White and Paris Peoples, with the team later winning the gold medal.
