= Madelief van Leur =

Dutch athlete (born 2007)

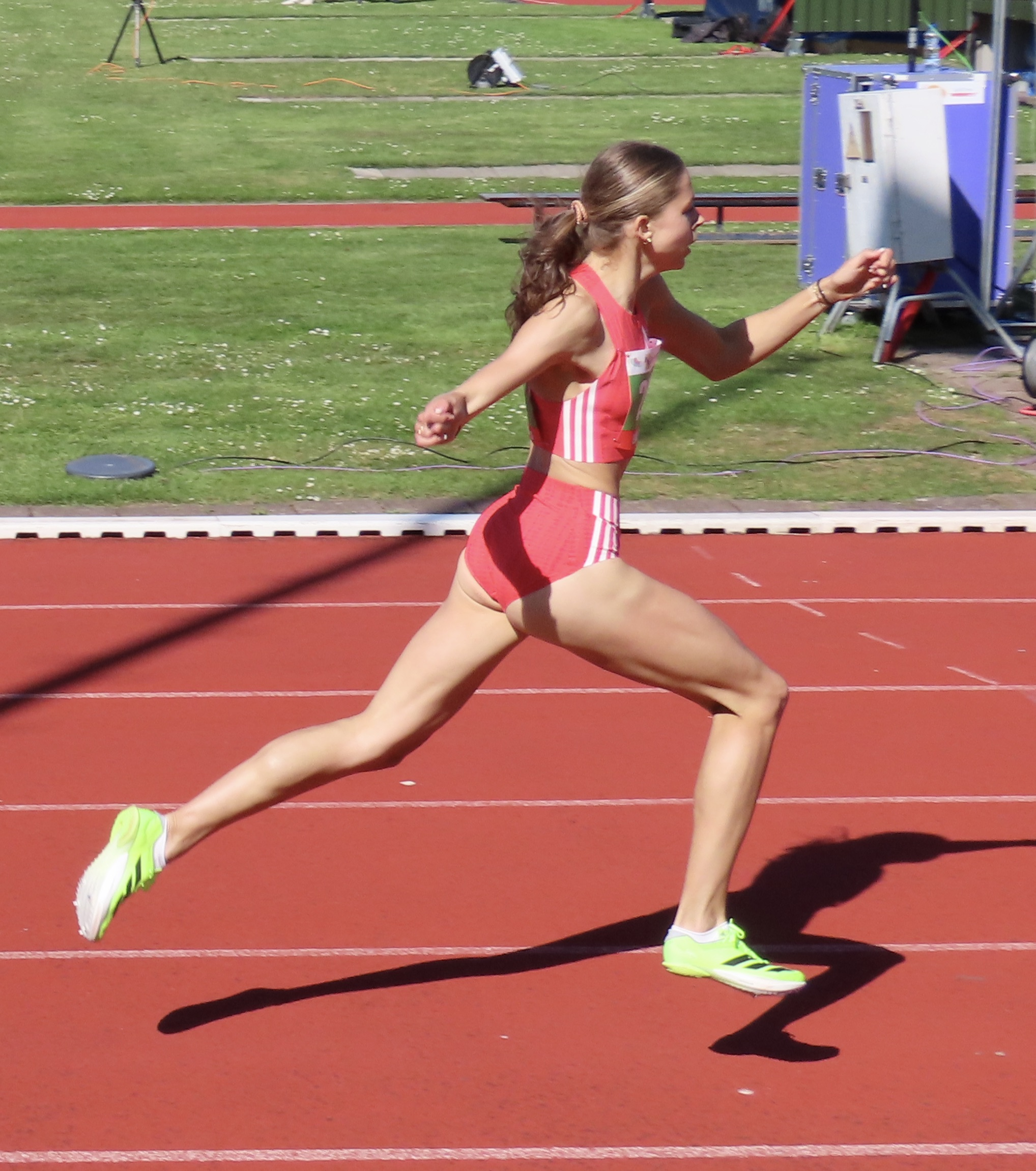
- Madelief van Leur wins the 300 m at the 2025 Ter Specke Bokaal meeting in Lisse, Netherlands.

Personal information
- Nationality: Dutch
- Born: 19 April 2007 (age 19)

Sport
- Sport: Athletics
- Event: Sprint
Medal record
Women's athletics
Representing Netherlands
World Indoor Championships
Silver medal – second place	2026 Toruń	4 × 400 m relay
European U20 Championships
Silver medal – second place	2023 Jerusalem	4 × 400 m relay
European U18 Championships
Bronze medal – third place	2024 Banska Bystrica	400 m

Madelief van Leur (pronounced [madəˈlif vɑn ˈløːr]; born 19 April 2007) is a Dutch sprinter. In 2024, she broke Femke Bol's Dutch under-18 record for the 400 metres indoors.

== Biography ==
From Leusden, in the province of Utrecht, she is a member of Altis athletics club in Amersfoort. She won gold in the 300 metres as a 15-year-old during the National Youth Championships in August 2022.

She was a gold medalist over 200 metres in the Dutch U20 championships in June 2023. She was a silver medalist in the women's 4 × 400 metres relay at the 2023 European Athletics U20 Championships in Jerusalem, Israel, in August 2023.

In February 2024, she improved the Dutch U18 indoor record for the 400 meters to 53.96 seconds, taking the record from Femke Bol, who previously ran 54.47 seconds in 2017. In June 2024, she won the Dutch U18 title over 200 metres in a Dutch age-group record time of 23.71 seconds. She won the bronze medal over 400 metres at the 2024 European Athletics U18 Championships in Banská Bystrica, Slovakia on 20 July 2024 in 53.19 seconds.

In February 2025, she was announced as being the subject of the documentary My Fire, by European Athletics. She ran 52.82 seconds for the 400 meters to set a new Dutch indoor under-20 record at the 2025 Dutch Indoor Athletics Championships. That month, she also became Dutch U20 indoor champion over 200 metres and lowered her indoors personal best to 24.02 seconds. She was selected for the 4 x 400 metres relay pool for the home 2025 European Athletics Indoor Championships, held in Apeldoorn, Netherlands.

She was selected for the 2026 World Athletics Indoor Championships in Poland in March 2026, winning a silver medal in the women's 4 x 400 metres relay. She competed with the Dutch squad at the 2026 World Athletics Relays in Gaborone, Botswana.
