= Myrte van der Schoot =

Dutch track and field athlete (born 2004)

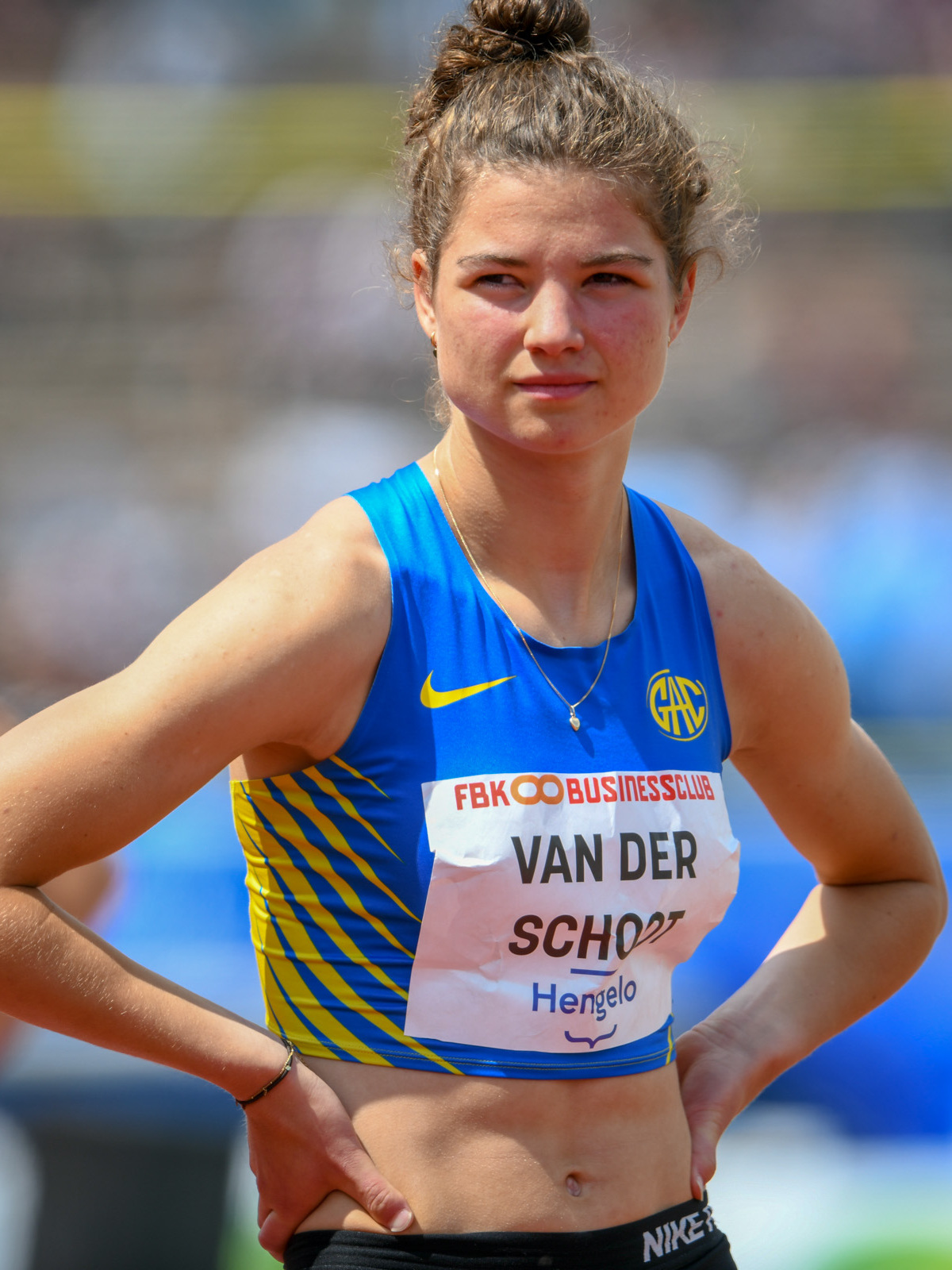
- Van der Schoot in 2022

Personal information
- Nationality: Dutch
- Born: 16 April 2004 (age 22)
- Height: 1.80 m (5 ft 11 in)

Sport
- Country: Netherlands
- Sport: Track and field
- Events: 400 m, 4 × 400 m relay, long jump
- Club: Gooise Atletiek Club

Achievements and titles
- Highest world ranking: No. 31 (400 m, 2026); No. 226 (long jump, 2023); No. 555 (overall, 2026)
- Personal bests: 400 m: 50.75 s (2026); 400 m sh: 51.33 s i (2026); long jump: 6.18 m (2022)
Medal record
Women's athletics
Representing the Netherlands
Olympic Games
Silver medal – second place	2024 Paris	4 × 400 m relay
World Championships
Bronze medal – third place	2025 Tokyo	4 × 400 m relay
World Indoor Championships
Gold medal – first place	2024 Glasgow	4 × 400 m relay
Silver medal – second place	2026 Toruń	4 × 400 m relay
European Championships
Gold medal – first place	2024 Rome	4 × 400 m relay
Gold medal – first place	2026 Birmingham	4 × 400 m relay
Bronze medal – third place	2026 Birmingham	4 × 400 m mixed
European U20 Championships
Silver medal – second place	2023 Jerusalem	4 × 400 m relay
Bronze medal – third place	2023 Jerusalem	400 m

Myrte van der Schoot (pronounced [ˈmɪrtə] [vɑn] [dər] [ˈsxoːt]; born 16 April 2004) is a Dutch track and field athlete who has competed in sprinting and long jump. In the 4 × 400 metres relay, she is the 2024 World Indoor Champion with the Dutch women's team.

== Youth and junior career ==
As a teenager, Van der Schoot competed in several different track and field events. She specialised in the 400 m and long jump, winning Dutch U18 and U20 national titles in both.

At the 2023 Dutch U20 Championships, Van der Schoot improved the national under-20 record of Femke Bol with a tenth of a second to 52.88 s. At the 2023 European U20 Championships in Jerusalem, Israel, she won a silver medal in the women's 4 × 400 metres relay where the relay team set a Dutch under-23/under-20 record of 3:33.33 min and a bronze medal in the 400 metres further improving her Dutch under-20 record to 52.85 s.

== Senior career ==
At the 2024 World Indoor Championships in Glasgow, United Kingdom, she ran in the heats of the 4 × 400 metres relay, helping the Dutch women's team qualify for the finals, where the team won the gold medal. At the 2024 European Championships in Rome, Italy, she ran in the heats of the 4 × 400 metres relay, helping the Dutch women's team qualify for the finals, where the team won the gold medal. At the 2024 Summer Olympics in Paris, France, she ran in the heats of the women's 4 × 400 metres relay, again helping the team qualify for the final, where they won the silver medal.

In the 2026 Meeting de Paris, Van der Schoot ran as a pacemaker in the 800 metres.

At the 2026 European Championships, she was a member of the Netherlands teams which won gold in the women's 4 × 400 metres relay and bronze in the mixed 4 × 400 metres relay.

== Personal bests ==
Information from her World Athletics profile unless otherwise noted.

=== Individual events ===
Personal best results for individual events
Event	Result	Venue	Date	Notes
100 metres	11.94 s	Leiden, Netherlands	14 June 2025	(Wind: +1.4 m/s)
200 metres	23.97 s	Leiden, Netherlands	14 June 2025	(Wind: +0.6 m/s)
200 metres short track	24.14 s i	Metz, France	8 February 2026	
300 metres	38.77 s	Lisse, Netherlands	13 May 2023	
400 metres	50.75 s	Birmingham, United Kingdom	13 August 2026	
400 metres short track	51.33 s i	Apeldoorn, Netherlands	1 March 2026	
800 metres	2:01.08 min	Bellinzona, Switzerland	30 August 2026	
Long jump	6.25 m w	Vught, Netherlands	26 May 2022	Wind assisted: +2.6 m/s
Long jump	6.18 m	Huizen, Netherlands	17 July 2022	(Wind: +1.1 m/s)
Long jump	6.18 m	Vught, Netherlands	20 May 2023	(Wind: +1.5 m/s)

==== Season's bests ====
Season's best performances
Year	Long jump	400 m long track	400 m short track
2018	4.93	59.22	59.70 i
2019	5.48	57.03	58.77 i
2020	5.58	56.21	57.15 i
2021	6.05	54.66	57.19 i
2022	**6.18**	53.99	54.99 i
2023	**6.18**	52.85	53.63 i
2024	5.93	52.48	52.81 i
2025	—N/a	51.62	52.02 i
2026	—N/a	**50.75**	**51.33 i**

Key: Lifetime best (in bold)

=== Team events ===
Personal best times for team events
Type	Event	Time	Venue	Date	Notes
Women	4 × 400 metres relay	3:21.10	Birmingham, United Kingdom	16 August 2026	Teamed with Lieke Klaver, Eveline Saalberg, and Femke Broeders-Bol. Van der Schoot's split time for the first leg was 51.0 s.
Women	4 × 400 metres relay short track	3:26.00 i	Toruń, Poland	22 March 2026	Teamed with Lieke Klaver, Nina Franke, and Eveline Saalberg. Van der Schoot ran the second leg.
Mixed	4 × 400 metres relay	3:10.77	Birmingham, United Kingdom	10 August 2026	Teamed with Jonas Phijffers, Lieke Klaver, and Terrence Agard. Van der Schoot's split time for the anchor leg was 50.9 s.
Mixed	4 × 400 metres relay short track	3:20.14 i	Toruń, Poland	21 March 2026	Teamed with Keenan Blake, Tony van Diepen, and Eveline Saalberg. Van der Schoot ran the second leg.

== Competition results ==
Information from her World Athletics profile unless otherwise noted.

=== World Athletics Rankings ===
Highest WA rankings per year
Year	Long jump	400 m	Overall
2020	575	—N/a	8266
2021	484	507	6266
2022	233	299	3728
2023	**226**	196	2594
2024	304	115	1650
2025	—N/a	62	1002
2026	—N/a	**31**	**555**

Key: Lifetime best (in bold)

=== International competitions ===
Representing the Netherlands
Year	Competition	Venue	Position	Event	Result	Notes
2023	European U20 Championships	Jerusalem, Israel	2nd	4 × 400 m relay	3:33.33	NU23R
2023	European U20 Championships	Jerusalem, Israel	3rd	400 m	52.85	NU20R
2024	World Indoor Championships	Glasgow, United Kingdom	1st	4 × 400 m relay	3:27.70 i	(Note: Van der Schoot did not run in the final; the listed time is from the heat she participated in.)
2024	World Relays	Nassau, Bahamas	10th (r1)	4 × 400 m relay	3:28:10	
2024	European Championships	Rome, Italy	1st	4 × 400 m relay	3:25:99	
2024	Olympic Games	Paris, France	2nd	4 × 400 m relay	3:25.03	
2025	World Championships	Tokyo, Japan	38th (h)	400 m	52.19	
2026	World Indoor Championships	Toruń, Poland	10th (sf)	400 m	52.15	
2026	World Indoor Championships	Toruń, Poland	2nd	4 × 400 m relay	3:26.00 i	
2026	European Championships	Birmingham, United Kingdom	3rd	4 × 400 m mixed	3:10.77	(50.9 split)
2026	European Championships	Birmingham, United Kingdom	12th (sf)	400 m	50.75	PB
2026	European Championships	Birmingham, United Kingdom	1st	4 × 400 m relay	3:21:10	(51.0 split)
2026	World Athletics Ultimate Championship	Budapest, Hungary	3rd (Note: At this championship, the top three teams don't receive medals, only the winner receives a trophy.)	4 × 400 m mixed	3:09.57	(50.34 split)

=== National championships ===
Representing GAC Hilversum
Year	Competition	Venue	Position	Event	Time	Notes
2018	Dutch U18 Championships	Emmeloord	6th	400 m	59.66	
2019	Dutch U18 Championships	Alphen aan de Rijn	1st	400 m	57.03	
2020	Dutch U18 Indoor Championships	Apeldoorn	2nd	400 m	57.15 i	
2020	Dutch Championships	Utrecht	7th	400 m	56.72	
2020	Dutch U18 Championships	Amersfoort	1st	400 m	57.36	
2021	Dutch Indoor Championships	Apeldoorn	13th (r1)	400 m	57.19 i	
2021	Dutch Championships	Breda	10th (sf)	400 m	54.66	
2021	Dutch Championships	Breda	6th	Long jump	5.81 m	
2021	Dutch U18 Championships	Amersfoort	1st	Long jump	5.76 m	
2021	Dutch U18 Championships	Amersfoort	1st	400 m	55.87	
2022	Dutch U20 Indoor Championships	Apeldoorn	1st	Long jump	6.07 m i	
2022	Dutch U20 Indoor Championships	Apeldoorn	1st	400 m}	55.15 i	
2022	Dutch Indoor Championships	Apeldoorn	10th (r1)	400 m	55.00 i	
2022	Dutch Indoor Championships	Apeldoorn	7th	Long jump	5.84 m i	
2022	Dutch U20 Championships	Amsterdam	1st	Long jump	6.00 m	
2022	Dutch U20 Championships	Amsterdam	1st	400 m	54.37	
2022	Dutch Championships	Apeldoorn	5th	400 m	54.64	
2023	Dutch U20 Indoor Championships	Apeldoorn	1st	400 m	54.29 i	PB
2023	Dutch U20 Indoor Championships	Apeldoorn	1st	Long jump	6.04 m i	
2023	Dutch Indoor Championships	Apeldoorn	7th (r1)	400 m	53.63 i	PB
2023	Dutch Indoor Championships	Apeldoorn	3rd	Long jump	6.02 m i	
2023	Dutch U20 Championships	Bergen op Zoom	1st	Long jump	6.04 m	
2023	Dutch U20 Championships	Bergen op Zoom	1st	400 m	52.88	NU20R
2023	Dutch Championships	Breda	4th	400 m	53.47	
2024	Dutch Indoor Championships	Apeldoorn	– (f)	400 m	52.81 i	PB (Note: Van der Schoot did not finish in the final; the listed time is from the heat.)
2024	Dutch Championships	Hengelo	3rd	400 m	52.48	PB
2025	Dutch Indoor Championships	Apeldoorn	3rd	400 m	52.02 i	PB
2025	Dutch Championships	Hengelo	1st	400 m	51.62	PB
2026	Dutch Indoor Championships	Apeldoorn	2nd	400 m	51.33 i	PB
2026	Dutch Championships	Hengelo	1st	400 m	51.09	
