= 2026 World Athletics Indoor Championships =

- Organisers: World Athletics
- Edition: 21st
- Dates: 20–22 March 2026
- Host city: Toruń, BiT, Kuyavian–Pomeranian, Poland
- Venue: Kujawsko-Pomorska Arena Toruń
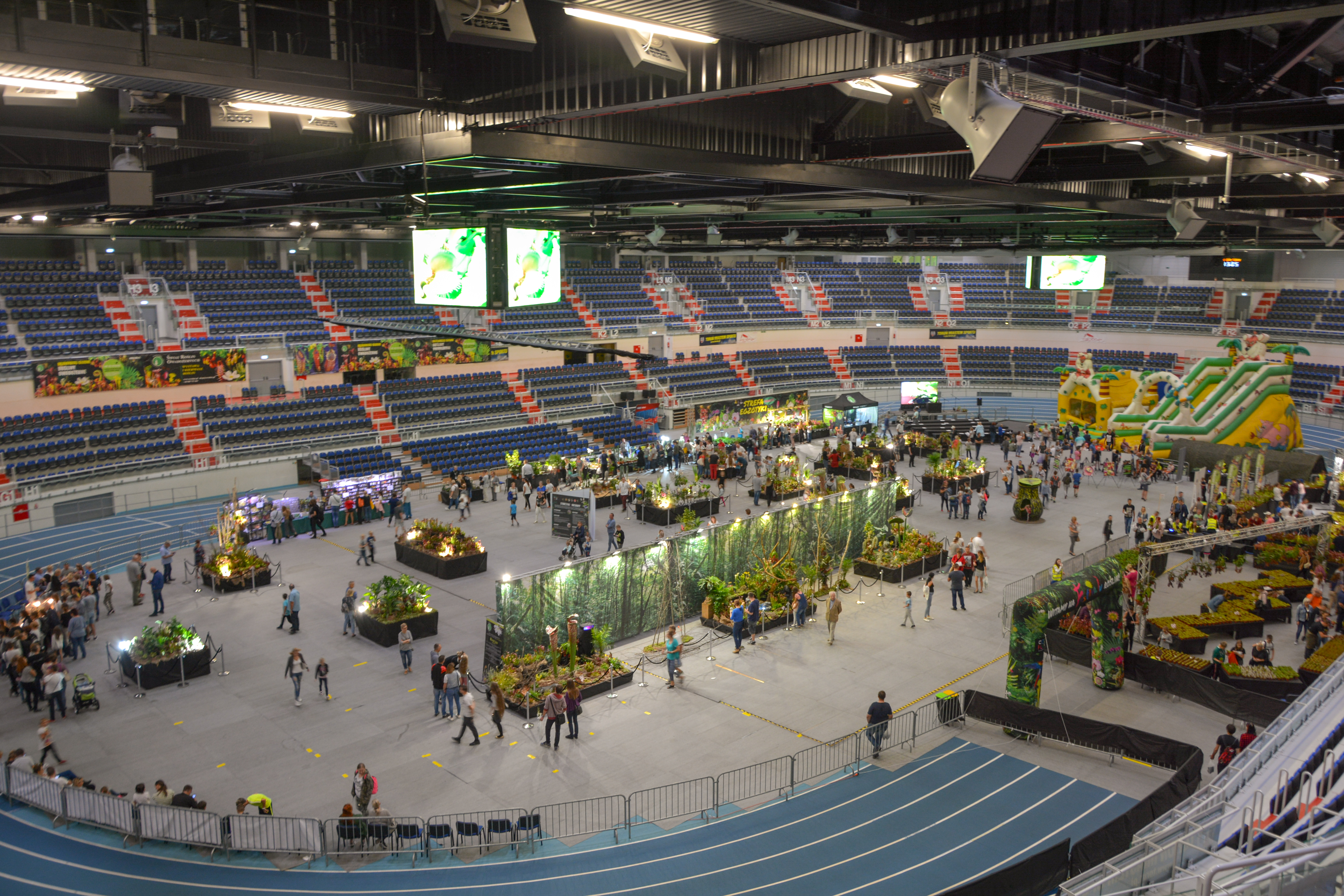
- Level: Senior
- Type: Indoor
- Events: 27

The 21st World Athletics Indoor Championships were held from 20 to 22 March 2026 at the Kujawsko-Pomorska Arena Toruń in Toruń, BiT City, Kuyavian–Pomeranian, Poland. It was the second time the country has held the event after the 2014 edition in Sopot. The venue previously hosted the 2021 European Athletics Indoor Championships.

On 22 March 2023, the World Athletics Council awarded the 2026 World Athletics Indoor Championships to Toruń, a UNESCO World Heritage Site, in the Kuyavian-Pomeranian region of Poland.

== Schedule ==
All times are local (UTC+1).

R1	Round 1	S	Semi-finals	F	Final
M = morning session, E = evening session

Men
Date →	20 March			21 March			22 March	
Event ↓	M	E		M	E		M	E
60 m	R1	S	F					
400 m	R1	S			F			
800 m	R1			S				F
1500 m		R1						F
3000 m					F			
60 m hurdles				R1	S	F		
4 × 400 m							R1	F
High jump				F				
Pole vault					F			
Long jump								F
Triple jump		F						
Shot put							F	
Heptathlon	F							

Women
Date →	20 March		21 March			22 March		
Event ↓	M	E	M	E		M	E	
60 m			R1	S	F			
400 m	R1	S		F				
800 m	R1		S				F	
1500 m		R1					F	
3000 m				F				
60 m hurdles						R1	S	F
4 × 400 m						R1	F	
High jump	F							
Pole vault							F	
Long jump						F		
Triple jump				F				
Shot put		F						
Pentathlon						F		

Mixed
Date →	20 March		21 March		22 March	
Event ↓	M	E	M	E	M	E
4 × 400 m			F			

Event detailed schedule
Day 1 — Friday, 20 March 2026
Time	Event	Gender	Round
10:05	60 metres	M	Heptathlon
10:20	60 metres	M	Round 1
10:50	Long Jump	M	Heptathlon
11:15	400 metres	W	Round 1
11:30	High Jump	W	Final
11:55	400 metres	M	Round 1
12:35	800 metres	W	Round 1
13:00	Shot Put	M	Heptathlon
13:20	800 metres	M	Round 1
Friday Evening
18:35	1500 metres	W	Round 1
18:35	High Jump	M	Heptathlon
18:45	Shot Put	W	Final
19:18	1500 metres	M	Round 1
19:35	Triple Jump	M	Final
20:05	400 metres	W	Semi-final
20:25	60 metres	M	Semi-final
20:50	400 metres	M	Semi-final
21:22	60 metres	M	Final
Day 2 — Saturday, 21 March 2026
Time	Event	Gender	Round
10:05	60 metres Hurdles	M	Heptathlon
10:20	60 metres Hurdles	M	Round 1
11:05	60 metres	W	Round 1
11:10	Pole Vault	M	Heptathlon
11:55	4x400 metres Relay	Mixed	Final
12:08	800 metres	W	Semi-final
12:15	High Jump	M	Final
12:37	800 metres	M	Semi-final
Saturday Evening
18:35	Pole Vault	M	Final
18:40	400 metres	M	Final
18:50	1000 metres	M	Heptathlon
19:05	3000 metres	W	Final
19:20	Triple Jump	W	Final
19:25	3000 metres	M	Final
19:50	60 metres Hurdles	M	Semi-final
20:15	60 metres	W	Semi-Final
20:44	400 metres	W	Final
21:05	60 metres Hurdles	M	Final
21:20	60 metres	W	Final
Day 3 — Sunday, 22 March 2026
Time	Event	Gender	Round
10:05	60 metres Hurdles	W	Pentathlon
10:20	Long Jump	W	Final
10:25	4x400 metres Relay	M	Round 1
10:45	High Jump	W	Pentathlon
11:00	4x400 metres Relay	W	Round 1
11:20	Shot Put	M	Final
12:55	60 metres hurdles	W	Round 1
13:15	Shot Put (Pentathlon)	W	Pentathlon
Sunday Evening
17:40	Long Jump (Pentathlon)	W	Pentathlon
18:05	Pole Vault	W	Final
19:02	Long jump	M	Final
19:09	1500 metres	M	Final
19:20	60 metres hurdles	W	Semi-final
19:42	1500 metres	W	Final
19:55	800 metres	M	Final
20:05	800 metres	W	Final
20:15	800 metres (Pentathlon)	W	Pentathlon
20:25	60 metres hurdles	W	Final
20:38	4 x 400 metres relay	M	Final
20:50	4 x 400 metres relay	W	Final

== Medal table ==
* Host nation (Poland)

Rank	Nation	Gold	Silver	Bronze	Total
1	United States	5	7	6	18
2	Great Britain	4	0	0	4
3	Italy	3	2	0	5
4	Portugal	2	1	0	3
4	Ukraine	2	1	0	3
6	Spain	1	2	2	5
7	Netherlands	1	2	1	4
8	Belgium	1	2	0	3
9	Poland*	1	1	2	4
10	Switzerland	1	1	1	3
11	Canada	1	1	0	2
12	Czech Republic	1	0	1	2
12	New Zealand	1	0	1	2
12	Sweden	1	0	1	2
15	Bahamas	1	0	0	1
15	Cuba	1	0	0	1
17	Australia	0	2	3	5
18	Jamaica	0	2	2	4
19	Greece	0	1	0	1
19	Mexico	0	1	0	1
19	Serbia	0	1	0	1
19	Slovenia	0	1	0	1
19	Venezuela	0	1	0	1
24	Algeria	0	0	1	1
24	Bulgaria	0	0	1	1
24	Colombia	0	0	1	1
24	France	0	0	1	1
24	Ireland	0	0	1	1
24	Saint Lucia	0	0	1	1
24	Senegal	0	0	1	1
24	South Korea	0	0	1	1
24	Trinidad and Tobago	0	0	1	1
Totals (32 entries)		27	29	29	85

== Placing table ==
United States won the placing table.

Rank	Country	1st place, gold medalist(s)	2nd place, silver medalist(s)	3rd place, bronze medalist(s)	4	5	6	7	8	Medals	Points
1	United States	5	7	6	1	4	3	4	1	18	164
2	Poland	1	1	2	2	1	3	3	2	4	58
3	Netherlands	1	2	1	3	1	1	2	0	4	54
4	Jamaica	0	2	2	2	3	0	2	0	4	52
5	Great Britain	4	0	0	2	1	0	1	1	4	49
5	Italy	3	2	0	0	0	0	5	1	5	49
7	Australia	0	2	3	1	1	0	1	0	5	43
8	Spain	1	2	2	0	0	1	0	2	5	39
9	Sweden	1	0	1	2	1	2	1	0	2	36
10	France	0	0	1	1	2	3	1	1	1	31

== Medal summary ==
=== Men ===
Event	Gold		Silver		Bronze	
60 metres	Jordan Anthony; United States	6.41 WL	Kishane Thompson; Jamaica	6.45 [.447] PB	Trayvon Bromell; United States	6.45 [.448]
400 metres	Christopher Morales Williams; Canada	44.76 CR	Khaleb McRae; United States	45.03	Jereem Richards; Trinidad and Tobago	45.39 SB
800 metres	Cooper Lutkenhaus; United States	1:44.24	Eliott Crestan; Belgium	1:44.38	Mohamed Attaoui; Spain	1:44.66
1500 metres	Mariano García; Spain	3:39.63	Isaac Nader; Portugal	3:40.06	Adam Spencer; Australia	3:40.26
3000 metres	Josh Kerr; Great Britain	7:35.56 SB	Cole Hocker; United States	7:35.70 SB	Yann Schrub; France	7:35.71
60 metres hurdles	Jakub Szymański; Poland	7.40	Enrique Llopis; Spain	7.42 NR	Trey Cunningham; United States	7.43
4 × 400 metres relay	United States; Justin Robinson; Chris Robinson; Demarius Smith; Khaleb McRae; Elija Godwin*; TJ Tomlyanovich*	3:01.52 CR	Belgium; Jonathan Sacoor; Christian Iguacel; Julien Watrin; Alexander Doom; Robin Vanderbemden*; Dylan Borlee*	3:03.29 SB	Jamaica; Reheem Hayles; Delano Kennedy; Tyrice Taylor; Kimar Farquharson; Demar Francis*	3:05.99
High jump	Oleh Doroshchuk; Ukraine	2.30 m SB	Erick Portillo; Mexico	2.30 m PB	Raymond Richards; Jamaica Woo Sang-hyeok; South Korea	2.26 m =SB 2.26 m
Pole vault	Armand Duplantis; Sweden	6.25 m CR	Emmanouil Karalis; Greece	6.05 m	Kurtis Marschall; Australia	6.00 m =PB
Long jump	Gerson Baldé; Portugal	8.46 m WL	Mattia Furlani; Italy	8.39 m =PB	Bozhidar Sarâboyukov; Bulgaria	8.31 m
Triple jump	Andy Díaz; Italy	17.47 m WL	Jordan Scott; Jamaica	17.33 m	Yasser Triki; Algeria	17.30 m
Shot put	Tom Walsh; New Zealand	21.82 m SB	Jordan Geist; United States	21.64 m	Roger Steen; United States	21.49 m
Heptathlon	Simon Ehammer; Switzerland	6670 WR	Heath Baldwin; United States	6337 PB	Kyle Garland; United States	6245 SB

=== Women ===
Event	Gold		Silver		Bronze	
60 metres	Zaynab Dosso; Italy	7.00	Jacious Sears; United States	7.03 [.022]	Julien Alfred; Saint Lucia	7.03 [.025]
400 metres	Lurdes Gloria Manuel; Czech Republic	50.76 PB	Natalia Bukowiecka; Poland	50.83 NR	Lieke Klaver; Netherlands	51.02
800 metres	Keely Hodgkinson; Great Britain	1:55.30 CR	Audrey Werro; Switzerland	1:56.64 NR	Addison Wiley; United States	1:58.36 PB
1500 metres	Georgia Hunter Bell; Great Britain	3:58.53 WL	Jessica Hull; Australia	3:59.45 AR	Nikki Hiltz; United States	3:59.68 PB
3000 metres	Nadia Battocletti; Italy	8:57.64	Emily Mackay; United States	8:58.12	Jessica Hull; Australia	8:58.18
60 metres hurdles	Devynne Charlton; Bahamas	7.65 =WR	Nadine Visser; Netherlands	7.73 SB	Pia Skrzyszowska; Poland	7.73 NR
4 × 400 metres relay	United States; Bailey Lear; Rosey Effiong; Paris Peoples; Shamier Little; Abbey Glynn*; Brianna White*	3:25.81 SB	Netherlands; Lieke Klaver; Myrte van der Schoot; Nina Franke; Eveline Saalberg; Madelief van Leur*; Elisabeth Paulina*	3:26.00 SB	Spain; Paula Sevilla; Ana Prieto; Rocio Arroyo; Blanca Hervas; Carmen Avilés*; Daniela Fra*	3:26.04 SB
High jump	Yaroslava Mahuchikh; Ukraine	2.01 m	Angelina Topić; Serbia Nicola Olyslagers; Australia Yuliya Levchenko; Ukraine	1.99 m	Not awarded	
Pole vault	Molly Caudery; Great Britain	4.85 m SB	Tina Šutej; Slovenia	4.80 m SB	Amálie Švábíková; Czech Republic Imogen Ayris; New Zealand Angelica Moser; Switzerland	4.70 m
Long jump	Agate de Sousa; Portugal	6.92 m	Larissa Iapichino; Italy	6.87 m	Natalia Linares; Colombia	6.80 m NR
Triple jump	Leyanis Pérez; Cuba	14.95 m =WL	Yulimar Rojas; Venezuela	14.86 m	Saly Sarr; Senegal	14.70 m PB
Shot put	Chase Jackson; United States	20.14 m	Sarah Mitton; Canada	19.78 m	Axelina Johansson; Sweden	19.75 m NR
Pentathlon	Sofie Dokter; Netherlands	4888 WL	Anna Hall; United States	4860 SB	Kate O'Connor; Ireland	4839 NR

=== Mixed ===
Event	Gold		Silver		Bronze	
4 × 400 metres relay	Belgium; Jonathan Sacoor; Julien Watrin; Helena Ponette; Ilana Hanssens	3:15.60 CR	Spain; Markel Fernández; David García; Paula Sevilla; Blanca Hervás	3:16.96	Poland; Marcin Karolewski; Kajetan Duszyński; Anna Gryc; Justyna Święty-Ersetic	3:17.44

== Qualification ==
The qualification period for all events ran from 1 November 2025 to 8 March 2026. Athletes could qualify by achieving the Entry Standard within the qualification period or by World Indoor Tour Wildcard, or by virtue of their position in the World Rankings as of 8 March 2026 to complete, where necessary, the target number of athletes in each event. In total no more than two male and two female athletes from any one Member were invited.

Entry Standards and target numbers of athletes / teams per event
Event	Women	Men	Quota
Event	Indoor	Indoor	Quota
60 metres	7.20	6.59	56
400 metres	51.75	45.80	30
800 metres	2:00.90	1:45.90	30
1500 metres (Mile)	4:06.00	3:36.00	30
3000 metres (5000 metres)	8:35.00	7:33.00	15
60 m hurdles	8.02	7.65	48
High jump	1.96 m (6 ft 5 in)	2.30 m (7 ft 6 1/2 in)	12
Pole vault	4.73 m (15 ft 6 in)	5.85 m (19 ft 2 1/4 in)	12
Long jump	6.75 m (22 ft 1 1/2 in)	8.17 m (26 ft 9 1/2 in)	16
Triple jump	14.15 m (46 ft 5 in)	16.90 m (55 ft 5 1/4 in)	16
Shot put	18.90 m (62 ft 0 in)	21.20 m (69 ft 6 1/2 in)	16
Combined events	see above		14
Relays	see above		

== Participating nations ==
674 athletes from 118 federations are entered in the event.

- Albania (1)
- Algeria (4)
- Andorra (1)
- Angola (1)
- Antigua and Barbuda (1)
- Argentina (1)
- Armenia (1)
- Australia (11)
- Austria (4)
- Azerbaijan (1)
- Bahamas (5)
- Bangladesh (1)
- Belgium (18)
- Bermuda (1)
- Bolivia (1)
- Brazil (19)
- Bulgaria (5)
- Cameroon (2)
- Canada (18)
- Chile (3)
- China (4)
- Chinese Taipei (4)
- Colombia (3)
- Cook Islands (1)
- Croatia (3)
- Cuba (6)
- Cyprus (1)
- Czech Republic (21)
- Denmark (1)
- Dominica (1)
- Dominican Republic (1)
- Ecuador (1)
- Egypt (3)
- El Salvador (1)
- Eritrea (1)
- Estonia (4)
- Ethiopia (10)
- Finland (8)
- France (25)
- French Polynesia (1)
- Great Britain (29)
- Gibraltar (1)
- Georgia (1)
- Germany (13)
- Ghana (1)
- Greece (8)
- Guinea-Bissau (1)
- Haiti (2)
- Hong Kong (1)
- Hungary (11)
- Iceland (3)
- Ireland (13)
- Italy (26)
- Jamaica (31)
- Japan (10)
- Jordan (1)
- Kazakhstan (1)
- Kenya (8)
- Kosovo (1)
- Kuwait (1)
- Kyrgyzstan (1)
- Latvia (1)
- Lebanon (1)
- Liberia (1)
- Lithuania (2)
- Luxembourg (3)
- Macau (1)
- Madagascar (1)
- Mali (1)
- Malta (1)
- Mauritius (1)
- Mexico (3)
- Moldova (1)
- Monaco (1)
- Montenegro (1)
- Nauru (1)
- Netherlands (25)
- New Zealand (13)
- Niger (1)
- Nigeria (1)
- North Macedonia (1)
- Northern Mariana Islands (1)
- Norway (10)
- Oman (1)
- Papua New Guinea (1)
- Paraguay (1)
- Philippines (4)
- Poland (37) (host)
- Portugal (19)
- Puerto Rico (4)
- Republic of the Congo (1)
- Romania (5)
- Saint Lucia (1)
- Saint Vincent and the Grenadines (1)
- San Marino (1)
- Senegal (3)
- Serbia (9)
- Seychelles (1)
- Singapore (1)
- Slovakia (10)
- Slovenia (13)
- South Africa (8)
- South Korea (1)
- Spain (27)
- Sweden (10)
- Switzerland (13)
- Togo (1)
- Trinidad and Tobago (4)
- Turkey (2)
- Ukraine (5)
- Uruguay (1)
- Uzbekistan (1)
- United States (60)
- United States Virgin Islands (1)
- Venezuela (7)
- Zimbabwe (1)
