= Paris Peoples =

American sprinter (born 2000)

Personal information
- Nationality: United States
- Born: 27 May 2000 (age 26)
- Height: 175 cm (5 ft 9 in)

Sport
- Sport: Athletics
- Event: Sprint

Achievements and titles
- Personal best(s): 400 m: 50.36 (Sacramento, 2023)
Medal record
Women's athletics
Representing United States
World Indoor Championships
| Gold medal – first place | 2026 Toruń | 4 × 400 m relay |
World Relays
| Gold medal – first place | 2026 Gaborone | Mixed 4 × 400 m relay |
| Silver medal – second place | 2025 Guangzhou | 4 × 400 m relay |

Paris Peoples (born 27 May 2000) is an American sprinter. She was third over 400 metres at the 2026 USA Indoor Championships.

== Early life ==
She attended Benjamin N. Cardozo High School in New York. She won 600 m race at the 2017 Indoor States Championship.

== Career ==
Peoples was a junior at the University of Arkansas by 2022. That year, she won the distance medley relay at the 2022 NCAA Indoor Championships alongside Isabel Van Camp, Krissy Gear and Logan Jolly. She ran a personal best for the 400 metres of 50.60 seconds in Sacramento, California in May 2023.

On 24 April 2025, she was named in the American team for the 2025 World Athletics Relays in Guangzhou, China in May 2025. She competed for the United States in the women's 4 × 400 metres relay as the team won their heat to secure a place at the 2025 World Championships. She ran the opening leg of the final with a 52.21 second split, as the American team came away with second place overall and the silver medal.

On 1 March 2026, she was third to Rosey Effiong and Bailey Lear in the 400 metres at the 2026 USA Indoor Track and Field Championships, running 51.63 seconds. She was selected for the United States relay teams at the 2026 World Athletics Indoor Championships in Toruń, Poland, winning the gold medal with the women's 4 × 400 m relay team.

Competing outdoors, Peoples beat Saint Vincent's Shafiqua Maloney to the line of the women's 600 m in a time of 1:23.45 at the 2026 Miramar Invitational on 4 April. In April ahe placed second to home runner Mercy Oketch in 51.06 seconds at the Kip Keino Classic in Nairobi. She was named in the United States team for the 2026 World Athletics Relays in Gaborone, Botswana. She ran as part of the mixed 4 x 400 metres relay team which won the gold medal having also won their heat on the opening day. She placed eighth in the 400 m at the 2026 Shanghai Diamond League and sixth on 19 June at the 2026 Doha Diamond League.
