= Rosey Effiong =

American athlete

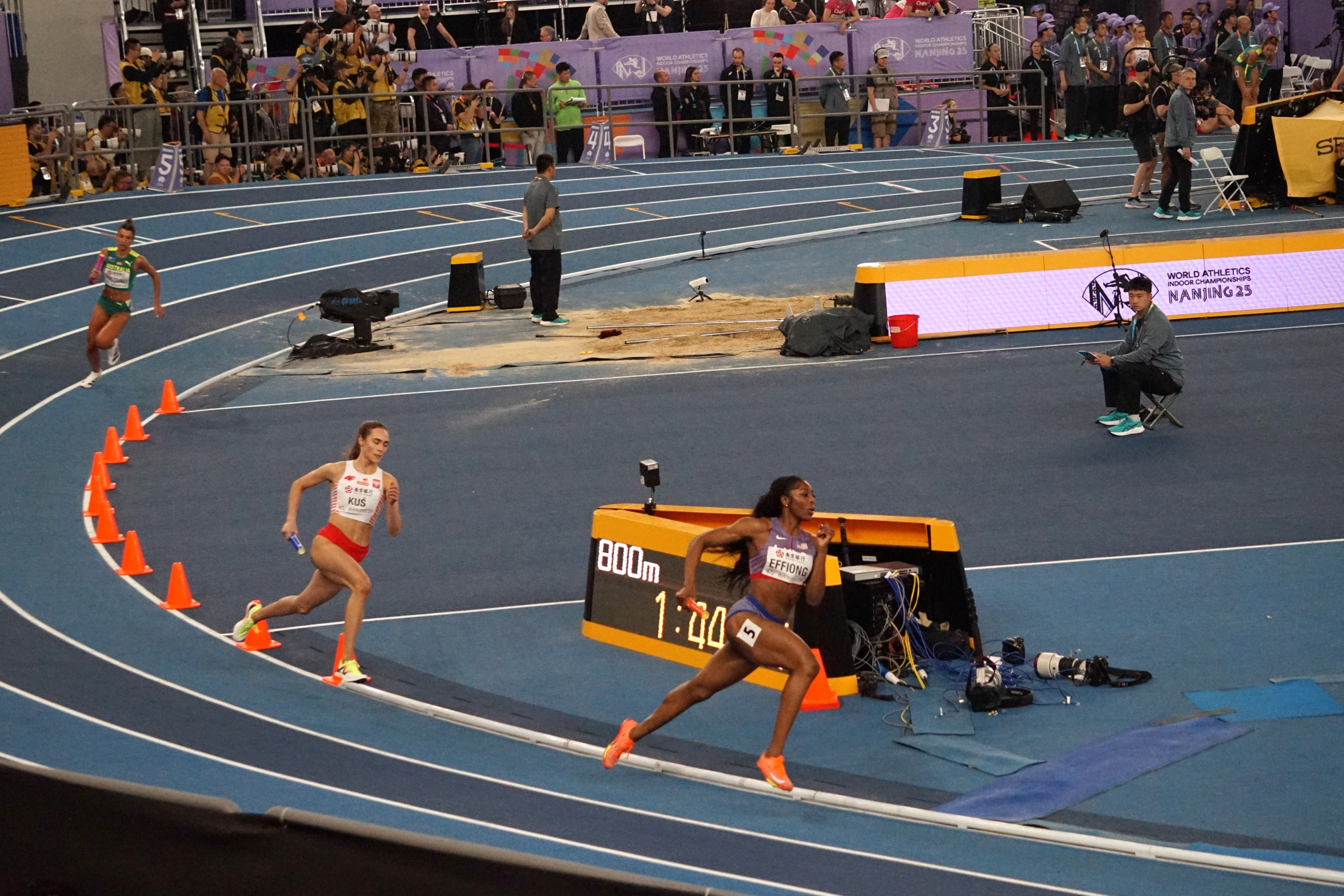
- Effiong at the 2025 World Indoor Championships

Personal information
- Nationality: United States
- Born: 8 May 2001 (age 25)

Sport
- Sport: Athletics
- Event: Sprint

Achievements and titles
- Personal bests: 200 m: 22.85 (Baton Rouge, 2023); 400 m: 49.72 (Eugene, 2024)
Medal record
Women's athletics
Representing the United States
World Championships
Gold medal – first place	2023 Budapest	4 × 400 m mixed
Gold medal – first place	2025 Tokyo	4 × 400 m relay
World Indoor Championships
Gold medal – first place	2025 Nanjing	4 × 400 m relay
Gold medal – first place	2026 Toruń	4 × 400 m relay

Rosey Effiong (born 8 May 2001) is an American sprinter. She is the reigning American champion over 400 metres indoors, having won the title at the 2026 USA Indoor Championships. She has won gold medals in the 4 × 400 metres relay at the World Athletics Championships and World Athletics Indoor Championships.

== Early life ==
Her parents, Daniel Effiong and Tina Chikezie, were both international sprinters in the for Nigeria. Growing up in the United States, Effiong joined the North Texas Cheetahs club team in high school, where her contemporaries included future olympian Jasmine Moore. She attended DeSoto High School in Dallas, Texas. Effiong began at the University of Arkansas and ran for the Arkansas Razorbacks from 2020.

== Career ==
Competing at the 2023 USA Outdoor Track and Field Championships, in Eugene, Oregon, she finished fifth in the final of the 400 m. She was subsequently selected for the USA relay pool for the 2023 World Athletics Championships in Budapest in August 2023 and competed in the mixed 4 × 400 m relay. She won a gold medal as the USA team set a new world record time of 3:08.80. The world record time set by Effiong, Alexis Holmes, Matthew Boling and Justin Robinson was ratified by World Athletics in November 2023.

She met the 2024 Paris Olympics standard running 50.75 seconds for the 400 m at the SEC Championship in Gainesville, Florida on 11 May 2024.

She was runner-up to Alexis Holmes over 400 metres at the 2025 USA Indoor Track and Field Championships. She was selected for the 2025 World Athletics Indoor Championships in Nanjing in March 2025, where she qualified for the final. She also won gold in the women's 4 × 400 metres relay. She qualified for the final of the 400 metres at the 2025 USA Outdoor Track and Field Championships, placing eighth overall in 51.29 seconds. She was subsequently selected for the 2025 World Athletics Championships in Tokyo, Japan, where she ran in the women's x 400 metres relay.

On 1 March 2026, she won the 400 metres at the 2026 USA Indoor Track and Field Championships, running 51.53 seconds, winning ahead of Bailey Lear and Paris Peoples. She was selected to represent the United States at the 2026 World Athletics Indoor Championships in Toruń, Poland, but did not advance to the semi-finals of the individual 400 metres. Later at the championships, she won the gold medal with the women's 4 × 400 m relay team.
