= Bailey Lear =

American athlete (born 2001)

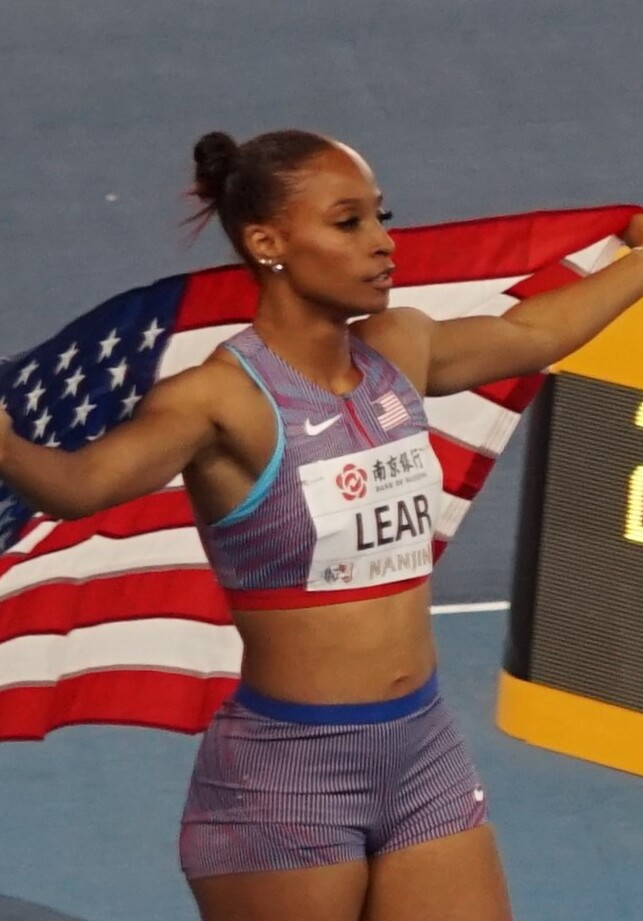
- Lear at the 2025 World Indoor Championships

Personal information
- Nationality: United States
- Born: 17 March 2001 (age 25)

Sport
- Sport: Athletics
- Event: 400 metres

Achievements and titles
- Personal bests: 400 m: 50.42 (Tokyo, 2026)
Medal record
Women's athletics
Representing United States
World Indoor Championships
| Gold medal – first place | 2025 Nanjing | 4 × 400 m relay |
| Gold medal – first place | 2026 Toruń | 4 × 400 m relay |
| Silver medal – second place | 2024 Glasgow | 4 × 400 m relay |
World Relays
| Gold medal – first place | 2026 Gaborone | Mixed 4 × 400 m relay |
| Gold medal – first place | 2024 Nassau | 4 × 400 m relay |
| Silver medal – second place | 2025 Guangzhou | 4 × 400 m relay |
NACAC U23 Championships
| Gold medal – first place | 2023 San Jose | Mixed 4 × 400 m relay |

Bailey Lear (born 17 March 2001) is an American sprinter. She was runner-up over 400 metres at the 2026 USA Indoor Championships. She was a gold medalist in the women's 4 × 400 metres relay at the 2025 World Indoor Championships.

== Early life ==
She attended Heritage High School in Frisco, Texas. A successful junior athlete, in February 2018, she became the fastest girls indoor 400 m runner ever in Texas with a 53.20 effort at the Texas Tech Open. She committed to attend University of Southern California in late 2017.

== Career ==
She was a gold medalist at the 2023 U23 NACAC Championships in San Jose, Costa Rica, in the mixed 4 × 400 m relay alongside Will Sumner, Caleb Cavanaugh, and Kiah Williams.

She finished fourth at the 2024 USA Indoor Track and Field Championships in New Mexico in the 400 metres. She was selected for the 2024 World Athletics Indoor Championships in Glasgow as part of the 4 × 400 m relay team. She was part of the quartet which qualified for the final, where they finished in the silver medal position.

In April 2024, she was selected as part of the American team for the 2024 World Athletics Relays in Nassau, Bahamas.

She finished fourth over 400 metres at the 2025 USA Indoor Track and Field Championships. She was selected for the relay pool at the 2025 World Athletics Indoor Championships in Nanjing in March 2025, where she won the gold medal in the women's 4 × 400 metres relay. On 24 April 2025, she was named in the American team for the 2025 World Athletics Relays in Guangzhou, China in May 2025. She competed for the United States in the women's 4 × 400 metres relay, running the anchor leg as the team won their heat to secure a place at the 2025 World Championships, and won the silver medal on the second day by finishing runner-up to Spain in the final.

On 1 March 2026, she was second to Rosey Effiong in the 400 metres at the 2026 USA Indoor Track and Field Championships, running 51.60 seconds. She was selected to represent the United States at the 2026 World Athletics Indoor Championships in Toruń, Poland. She was a semi-finalist in the individual 400 metres at the championship. She later won the gold medal with the women's 4 × 400 m relay team. She was named in the United States team for the 2026 World Athletics Relays in Gaborone, Botswana. She ran as part of the mixed 4 x 400 metres relay team which won the gold medal having also won their heat on the opening day. Later that month, Lear ran a personal best 50.42 for the 400 metres at the Golden Grand Prix in Tokyo.

== Personal life ==
She received her bachelors's degree in communication from USC in 2021. She received a master's degree in entrepreneurship and innovation in 2022 and another master's degree in digital media management in 2023, both from USC. Lear was named an assistant coach for sprints and hurdles, and operations coordinator, for University of Georgia in October 2023.
