= 2026 World Athletics Continental Tour =

- Organisers: World Athletics
- Edition: 7th
- Dates: 17 January – 1 November

The 2026 World Athletics Continental Tour, also known as the 2026 Continental Tour, is the 7th season of the annual series of outdoor track and field meetings organised by World Athletics. The Tour forms the second tier of international one-day meetings after the 2026 Diamond League.

The Continental Tour is divided into subgroups and categories – Gold (A), Silver (B), Bronze (C) and Challenger (D) – each of which have different levels of competition and different prize offerings.

== Schedule ==
Date	Meeting	Venue	Country
Gold (11)
27 Mar	Maurie Plant Meet	Melbourne	Australia
24 Apr	Kip Keino Classic	Nairobi	Kenya
17 May	Seiko Golden Grand Prix	Tokyo	Japan
29 May	Irena Szewinska Memorial	Bydgoszcz	Poland
3 Jun	Paavo Nurmi Games	Turku	Finland
6 Jun	USATF Lone Star Grand Prix	College Station	United States
13 Jun	USATF Los Angeles Grand Prix	Los Angeles	United States
16 Jun	Ostrava Golden Spike	Ostrava	Czech Republic
21 Jun	FBK Games	Hengelo	Netherlands
26 Jun	Memorial Borisa Hanžekovića	Zagreb	Croatia
14 Jul	Gyulai István Memorial - Hungarian Athletics Grand Prix	Budapest	Hungary
Silver (46)
28 Mar	The TEN	San Juan Capistrano	United States
4 Apr	Miramar Invitational	Miramar	United States
20 Apr	Drake Relays Vault at Jordan Creek	Des Moines	United States
22 Apr	116th Drake Relays	Des Moines	United States
23 Apr	Penn Relay Carnival	Philadelphia	United States
26 Apr	Botswana Golden Grand Prix	Gaborone	Botswana
28 Apr	Simbine Classic	Pretoria	South Africa
17 May	Coqui International Cup	Caguas	Puerto Rico
18 May	The 4th Belt and Road Athletics Invitational Meeting	Chongqing	China
23 May	LA Track Festival	Los Angeles	United States
23 May	Tucson Elite Throws	Tucson	United States
24 May	Internationales Pfingstsportfest Rehlingen	Rehlingen	Germany
27 May	Canarias Athletics Invitational	Santa Cruz de Tenerife	Spain
27 May	JBL Jump Fest	Košice	Slovakia
28 May	Trond Mohn Games	Bergen	Norway
30 May	Grand Prix International CAA de Douala	Douala	Cameroon
31 May	Goldenes Oval	Dresden	Germany
6 Jun	New Taipei City Athletics Open	New Taipei City	Chinese Taipei
13 Jun	Dromia International Sprint and Relays Meeting	Vari	Greece
20 Jun	Tag der Überflieger	Essen	Germany
25 Jun	Brněnská Laťka Olympia	Brno	Czech Republic
25 Jun	GRAND SLAM - Jerusalem	Jerusalem	Israel
28 Jun	Czesław Cybulski Memorial	Poznań	Poland
28 Jun	Piraeus Street Long Jump	Piraeus	Greece
1 Jul	Perche des Alpes	Montbonnot-Saint-Martin	France
1 Jul	Raiffeisen AUSTRIAN OPEN Eisenstadt	Eisenstadt	Austria
3 Jul	Meeting Stanislas Nancy	Tomblaine	France
5 Jul	Fly Athens	Athens	Greece
5 Jul	Opolski Festiwal Skoków	Opole	Poland
10 Jul	Ed Murphey Classic	Memphis	United States
11 Jul	Sunset Tour	Los Angeles	United States
12 Jul	Edmonton Athletics Invitational	Edmonton	Canada
16 Jul	Meeting Madrid	Madrid	Spain
16 Jul	Spitzen Leichtathletik Luzern	Luzern	Switzerland
21 Jul	TIPOS P-T-S Meeting	Banská Bystrica	Slovakia
23 Jul	WACT Silver Hammer Throw Competition	Szombathely	Hungary
5 Aug	Monaco Athletics Festival	Monaco	Monaco
17 Aug	Golden Sand	Międzyzdroje	Poland
22 Aug	Felix Sanchez Classic	Santo Domingo	Dominican Republic
22 Aug	Indian Open	Bhubaneswar	India
29 Aug	Internationales Hochsprungmeeting Heilbronn	Heilbronn	Germany
30 Aug	Galà dei Castelli	Bellinzona	Switzerland
30 Aug	Grand Prix Brescia	Brescia	Italy
30 Aug	ISTAF Berlin	Berlin	Germany
8 Sep	Palio Città della Quercia	Rovereto	Italy
18 Sep	ORLEN Janusz Kusocinski Memorial	Chorzów	Poland
Bronze (86)
24 Jan	Pak'n Save Cooks International Classic	Whanganui	New Zealand
8 Feb	Sir Graeme Douglas International	Auckland	New Zealand
14 Feb	Perth Track Classic	Perth	Australia
21 Feb	International Track Meet	Christchurch	New Zealand
28 Feb	Hobart Track Classic	Hobart	Australia
13 Mar	Adelaide Invitational	Adelaide	Australia
10 Apr	Oklahoma Throws Series World Invitational	Ramona	United States
15 Apr	Mt. SAC Relays	Walnut	United States
17 Apr	Meeting International de Djibouti	Djibouti	Djibouti
18 Apr	Addis Ababa Grand Prix	Addis Ababa	Ethiopia
19 Apr	Continental Tour Orlando Guaita	Santiago	Chile
29 Apr	Oda Mikio Memorial	Hiroshima	Japan
3 May	Shizuoka International Athletics Meet	Fukuroi	Japan
8 May	Ročník Hvězdného Házení	Domažlice	Czech Republic
10 May	Kinami Michitaka Memorial Athletics Meet	Osaka	Japan
15 May	Saudi Athletics Grand Prix	Riyadh	Saudi Arabia
20 May	Savona International Meeting	Savona	Italy
23 May	IFAM Outdoor	Brussels	Belgium
24 May	Lisek w domu - International Pole Vault Meeting	Duszniki	Poland
27 May	'Filathlitikos Kallitheas' International Jumping Meeting	Kallithea	Greece
29 May	Cyprus International Athletics Meeting	Limassol	Cyprus
30 May	Twolaps Middle Distance Circuit	Tokyo	Japan
31 May	Bob Vigars Classic	London	Canada
31 May	Meeting International de Forbach	Forbach	France
31 May	Mityng na Rynku w Białymstoku	Białystok	Poland
31 May	Venizeleia-Chania International Meeting	Chania	Greece
1 Jun	Josef Odložil Memorial	Prague	Czech Republic
3 Jun	Filothei Women Gala	Filothei	Greece
3 Jun	Royal City Inferno Track and Field Festival	Guelph	Canada
4 Jun	Liese Prokop Memorial	St. Pölten	Austria
5 Jun	1500m Elite Jessheim	Jessheim	Norway
5 Jun	Touch the Clouds Festival	Gräfelfing	Germany
7 Jun	Sparkassen Werfertag	Gelenau	Germany
7 Jun	Halina Konopacka Classic	Warsaw	Poland
7 Jun	Johnny Loaring Classic	Windsor	Canada
9 Jun	Kladno hází a Kladenské Memoriály	Kladno	Czech Republic
10 Jun	Motonet GP Lahti	Lahti	Finland
13 Jun	Hong Kong Athletics Open	Hong Kong	Hong Kong
13 Jun	Meeting Nikaia	Nice	France
14 Jun	EUROWINGS Flight Circus	Düsseldorf	Germany
14 Jun	Folksam GP Sollentuna	Sollentuna	Sweden
16 Jun	Heino Lipp Memorial	Jõhvi	Estonia
17 Jun	COSMA Cup World Athletics Continental Tour	Palanga	Lithuania
17 Jun	Meeting International de Montreuil	Montreuil	France
18 Jun	Grand Prix Ústí nad Labem	Ústí nad Labem	Czech Republic
18 Jun	Iron Wood Classic	Rathdrum	United States
19 Jun	Anhalt - Internationales Leichtathletik Meeting	Dessau	Germany
19 Jun	Meeting International Montgeron-Essonne	Montgeron	France
20 Jun	Schönebecker Solecup	Schönebeck	Germany
20 Jun	ATX Classic	Georgetown	United States
20 Jun	Bottnarydskastet International	Bottnaryd	Sweden
20 Jun	Motonet GP Kuortane	Kuortane	Finland
20 Jun	Korea Athletics Open	Yecheon	South Korea
20 Jun	Portland Track Festival	Portland	United States
21 Jun	Hylo Javelin Meeting	Offenburg	Germany
22 Jun	Copenhagen Athletics Games	Copenhagen	Denmark
24 Jun	Boysen Memorial	Oslo	Norway
24 Jun	TIPOS Atletické Kritérium SNP	Banská Bystrica	Slovakia
27 Jun	LA Throws Cup	Wilmington	United States
28 Jun	Meeting International d'Athlétisme de Troyes Aube	Troyes	France
30 Jun	La Classique d'athlétisme de Montréal	Montreal	Canada
30 Jun	Qosanov Memorial	Astana	Kazakhstan
4 Jul	Continental Tour Memorial Alex Quiñonez	Cuenca	Ecuador
4 Jul	Meeting Maia Cidade do Desporto	Maia	Portugal
4 Jul	Ordizia Meeting - International Meeting Jose Antonio Peña	Ordizia	Spain
5 Jul	Fuse Sprint	Tottori	Japan
8 Jul	Cork City Sports International Athletics	Cork	Ireland
8 Jul	Folksam Grand Prix Karlstad	Karlstad	Sweden
8 Jul	Joensuu Motonet GP	Joensuu	Finland
8 Jul	Meeting Sport e Solidarietà Lignano	Lignano Sabbiadoro	Italy
10 Jul	Morton Games	Dublin	Ireland
11 Jul	Grand Prix Nove Mesto nad Metuji	Nové Město nad Metují	Czech Republic
11 Jul	Meeting of Braga	Braga	Portugal
11 Jul	Moore-Guldensporenmeeting	Kortrijk	Belgium
12 Jul	Tampere Meeting	Tampere	Finland
14 Jul	Harry Jerome Track Classic	Burnaby	Canada
15 Jul	Meeting International d'Athlétisme de la Province de Liège	Liège	Belgium
18 Jul	Night of Athletics	Heusden-Zolder	Belgium
1 Aug	IFAM Oordegem	Oordegem	Belgium
19 Aug	Espoo Motonet GP	Espoo	Finland
24 Aug	Folksam Grand Prix Göteborg	Gothenburg	Sweden
26 Aug	International Wiesław Maniak Memorial	Szczecin	Poland
30 Aug	Memorial Zbigniewa Ludwichowskiego	Olsztyn	Poland
1 Sep	UAE Athletics Grand Prix	Dubai	United Arab Emirates
2 Sep	Serbia Athletics Meeting	Belgrade	Serbia
5 Sep	Oman Athletics Grand Prix	Muscat	Oman
Challenger (142)
17 Jan	Allan & Sylvia Potts Classic	Hastings	New Zealand
23 Feb	Egypt Winter Cup	Ismailia	Egypt
4 Mar	MTN CHAMPS Athletics Classics	Calabar	Nigeria
13 Mar	20th Carolina Spring Break Camp/Classic	Carolina	Puerto Rico
21 Mar	Maseru International Meet	Maseru	Lesotho
21 Mar	Velocity Fest 18	Kingston	Jamaica
26 Mar	MTN CHAMPS Continental Relays	Jos	Nigeria
1 Apr	Clyde Littlefield Texas Relays	Austin	United States
3 Apr	Pepsi Florida Relays	Gainesville	United States
7 Apr	Hezekiel Sepeng Invitational	Potchefstroom	South Africa
9 Apr	44 Farms Team Invitational	College Station	United States
9 Apr	Bryan Clay Invitational	Azusa	United States
10 Apr	Cape Miller Continental Tour	Stellenbosch	South Africa
11 Apr	Road-To-Botswana Golden Grand Prix	Gaborone	Botswana
15 Apr	MTN CHAMPS Grand Final	Ibadan	Nigeria
16 Apr	Tom Jones Memorial	Gainesville	United States
18 Apr	Challenger Continental Tour Ciudad de Buenos Aires	Buenos Aires	Argentina
18 Apr	Nurullah Ivak Throwing Cup	İzmir	Turkey
19 Apr	Challenger Continental Tour Hugo M. La Nasa	Buenos Aires	Argentina
19 Apr	Velocity Fest 19	Kingston	Jamaica
25 Apr	Grand Prix Estrella Puente	Montevideo	Uruguay
25 Apr	National Athletics Grand Prix 1	Zhaoqing	China
26 Apr	Grand Prix Darwin Piñeyrúa	Montevideo	Uruguay
2 May	LSU Invitational	Baton Rouge	United States
3 May	ESET WMD-Night	Busto Arsizio	Italy
9 May	International Pegaso Meeting	Florence	Italy
9 May	Portland Twilight	Portland	United States
9 May	Ter Specke Bokaal	Lisse	Netherlands
9 May	The Belfast Classic	Belfast	United Kingdom
9 May	National Athletics Grand Prix 2	Jiaxing	China
14 May	KPMG Prague Night of PBs	Prague	Czech Republic
15 May	Grand Prix Memorial Brigido Iriarte	Caracas	Venezuela
16 May	British Milers Club Grand Prix	Manchester	United Kingdom
16 May	Meeting de Atletismo Toni Bonet	Ibiza	Spain
16 May	Next Generation Athletics	Nijmegen	Netherlands
16 May	Saudi Athletics Challenger	Riyadh	Saudi Arabia
16 May	Vergotia 2026	Argostoli	Greece
16 May	Halplus Werfertage	Halle (Saale)	Germany
17 May	Grand Prix Memorial Maximo Viloria	Barquisimeto	Venezuela
17 May	Internationales Läufermeeting	Pliezhausen	Germany
20 May	Desafio Nerja	Nerja	Spain
20 May	Egypt Athletics Grand Prix	Ismailia	Egypt
22 May	Kifisia Jump	Kifisia	Greece
23 May	Pfingstmeeting	Zofingen	Switzerland
23 May	Spåret 5000m	Stockholm	Sweden
23 May	TIPOS Challenge Slovakia	Martin	Slovakia
23 May	Internationales Sparkassen Hammerwurf-Meeting	Fränkisch-Crumbach	Germany
24 May	Alexandrino Meeting - Georgios Pantos Memorial	Alexandreia	Greece
26 May	Memoriál Ludvíka Daňka	Turnov	Czech Republic
29 May	Meeting National de Seine et Marne	Fontainebleau	France
29 May	Music City Track Carnival	Cleveland	United States
30 May	PUMA Nitro Lange Laufnacht	Karlsruhe	Germany
30 May	Triveneto Meeting Internazionale	Trieste	Italy
30 May	British Milers Club Grand Prix	Birmingham	United Kingdom
30 May	Busan International Pole Vault Meeting	Busan	South Korea
30 May	National Athletics Grand Prix 4	Bengbu	China
31 May	Mednarodni Atletski Miting Ptuj in Memorial Roberta Preloga	Ptuj	Slovenia
2 Jun	Atletica 2000 Meeting	San Vito al Tagliamento	Italy
3 Jun	Granada Challenger	Granada	Spain
4 Jun	Memorial Matica Šuštaršiča in Patrika Cvetana	Maribor	Slovenia
4 Jun	HOKA Festival of Miles	St. Louis	United States
4 Jun	Memorial José Barrientos	Havana	Cuba
5 Jun	Internationales Sparkassenmeeting	Osterode	Germany
5 Jun	Täby Stavhoppsgala	Täby	Sweden
6 Jun	Gorzów Meeting	Gorzów Wielkopolski	Poland
6 Jun	Izmir Cup	İzmir	Turkey
6 Jun	Papaflessia	Kalamata	Greece
6 Jun	The Lightning 10,000	Stadtallendorf	Germany
6 Jun	National Athletics Grand Prix 5	Huangshi	China
7 Jun	Lucca International Meeting	Lucca	Italy
7 Jun	The Adrian Martinez Classic	Concord	United States
10 Jun	Meeting Cidade de Lisboa	Lisbon	Portugal
10 Jun	Meeting de Marseille	Marseille	France
10 Jun	Miting Celjskih Knezov	Celje	Slovenia
10 Jun	Salix Sub Astra	Vrbovec	Croatia
13 Jun	Int. Golden Roof Challenge	Innsbruck	Austria
13 Jun	British Milers Club Grand Prix	Loughborough	United Kingdom
13 Jun	EAP Malta International	Marsa	Malta
13 Jun	Envol Trophée	Pierre-Bénite	France
13 Jun	Fly in SKG	Thessaloniki	Greece
13 Jun	Gouden Spike Meeting	Leiden	Netherlands
13 Jun	Meeting d'athlétisme de Poitiers	Poitiers	France
14 Jun	Janusz Sidlo Memorial	Sopot	Poland
16 Jun	Lundahoppet	Lund	Sweden
17 Jun	Långlöparnas Kväll	Stockholm	Sweden
18 Jun	Meeting Internacional Ciudad de Málaga	Málaga	Spain
20 Jun	Festival Lancers	Salon-de-Provence	France
20 Jun	Meeting Annecy	Annecy	France
20 Jun	Track Night Vienna	Vienna	Austria
21 Jun	WGV Leichtathletikfestival	Stuttgart	Germany
23 Jun	NetAachen Domspringen	Aachen	Germany
24 Jun	Meeting de Bordeaux	Bordeaux	France
26 Jun	CTFL Finals	Ottawa	Canada
27 Jun	Internationales Hofer Sparkassen Stabhochsprung-Meeting	Hof	Germany
27 Jun	Immobel International Athletics Meeting of Nivelles	Nivelles	Belgium
27 Jun	Keihaskarnevaalit	Pihtipudas	Finland
27 Jun	Meeting International de Carquefou	Carquefou	France
27 Jun	The Village Power Shot	Modipane	Botswana
28 Jun	Korzo Jump	Varaždin	Croatia
30 Jun	Fribourg International Meeting	Fribourg	Switzerland
1 Jul	Mednarodni miting Novo Mesto	Novo Mesto	Slovenia
1 Jul	Challenger Game Oulu	Oulu	Finland
1 Jul	GP Diputacion Castellon - Memorial Jose Antonio Cansino	Castellón de la Plana	Spain
1 Jul	Gran Prix Internacional "Richard Boroto"	Cuenca	Ecuador
3 Jul	Classique d'Athlétisme de Québec	Quebec City	Canada
4 Jul	Meeting National Est Lyonnais	Décines-Charpieu	France
4 Jul	Meeting voor Mon	Leuven	Belgium
4 Jul	Meeting International Bouvet-Bionda	Thonon-les-Bains	France
7 Jul	Míting Internacional Ciutat de Barcelona	Barcelona	Spain
10 Jul	PUMA Fast Arms Fast Legs	Wetzlar	Germany
10 Jul	The Elliott Denman N.J. International	West Long Branch	United States
11 Jul	Cezmi Or Cup	Istanbul	Turkey
11 Jul	Aleksander Lohu Memorial	Tallinn	Estonia
11 Jul	British Milers Club Grand Prix	Watford	United Kingdom
11 Jul	Vulcan Vault	Pelham	United States
11 Jul	World Jump Day TRANSDANUBIA	Linz	Austria
12 Jul	Klaverblad International High Jump Meeting	Zoetermeer	Netherlands
12 Jul	MAIF Hoppet	Mariestad	Sweden
12 Jul	Stumptown Twilight	Portland	United States
15 Jul	Athletics Meeting "Kostas Spanidis"	Thessaloniki	Greece
16 Jul	Meeting Arcobaleno EAP AtleticaEuropa	Celle Ligure	Italy
16 Jul	Nordic High Jump Challenge	Bergen	Norway
18 Jul	Dauphin Street Vault	Mobile	United States
18 Jul	Lappeenranta Games	Lappeenranta	Finland
18 Jul	National Athletics Grand Prix - Final	Yulin	China
7 Aug	Sir Walter Miler	Raleigh	United States
8 Aug	British Milers Club Grand Prix	Twickenham	United Kingdom
8 Aug	Ndola International Meet	Ndola	Zambia
19 Aug	Atletický Mítink Rieter	Ústí nad Orlicí	Czech Republic
20 Aug	Tyczka na Molo	Sopot	Poland
22 Aug	Asta in Piazza Aosta	Aosta	Italy
22 Aug	UAE Athletics Women's Gala	Dubai	United Arab Emirates
26 Aug	Natanya Festival	Netanya	Israel
29 Aug	Lisek i Przyjaciele Szczecin Pole Vault Meeting	Szczecin	Poland
29 Aug	Speerwerpersfestival	Sint-Niklaas	Belgium
30 Aug	International Pole Vault Meeting for Women	Beckum	Germany
3 Sep	Velká cena Chebu	Cheb	Czech Republic
5 Sep	The Monument Mile Classic	Stirling	United Kingdom
8 Sep	Dinamo Zrinjevac - International Athletics Meeting	Zagreb	Croatia
26 Sep	Romanian International Pole Vault Gala	Bucharest	Romania
31 Oct–1 Nov	Grand Prix del Paraguay	Asunción	Paraguay
