= 2023 World Athletics Continental Tour =

- Organisers: World Athletics
- Edition: 4th
- Dates: 21 January – 1 October

The 2023 World Athletics Continental Tour, also known as the 2023 Continental Tour, was the fourth season of the annual series of outdoor track and field meetings, organised by World Athletics. The Tour forms the second tier of international one-day meetings after the Diamond League.

The Continental Tour was divided into four levels – Gold, Silver, Bronze and Challenger – each of which have different levels of competition and different prize offerings.

== Schedule ==
Date	Meeting	Venue	Country
GOLD Meetings (13)
23 February	Maurie Plant Meet	Lakeside Stadium, Melbourne	Australia
29 April	Botswana Golden Grand Prix	National Stadium, Gaborone	Botswana
13 May	Kip Keino Classic	Moi International Sports Centre, Nairobi	Kenya
21 May	Seiko Golden Grand Prix	International Stadium, Yokohama	Japan
21 May	USATF Bermuda Grand Prix	National Sports Centre, Devonshire	Bermuda
27 May	USATF Los Angeles Invitational	Drake Stadium, Los Angeles	United States
4 June	FBK Games	Blankers-Koen Stadion, Hengelo	Netherlands
6 June	Irena Szewińska Memorial	Zdzislaw Krzyszkowiak Stadium, Bydgoszcz	Poland
13 June	Paavo Nurmi Games	Paavo Nurmi Stadium, Turku	Finland
24 June	USATF New York Grand Prix	Icahn Stadium, New York	United States
27 June	Ostrava Golden Spike	Mestský Stadion, Ostrava	Czech Republic
18 July	Gyulai István Memorial	Bregyó Athletic Center, Székesfehérvár	Hungary
8–10 September	Memorial Borisa Hanžekovića	Sports Park Mladost, Zagreb	Croatia
SILVER Meetings (30)
4–5 March	The TEN	JSerra Catholic HS, San Juan Capistrano	United States
25 March	Brisbane Track Classic	QSAC, Brisbane	Australia
26 March	Grand Prix International de Douala	Stade de la Réunification de Bepanda, Douala	Cameroon
4 April	Meeting International de Dakar	Dakar	Senegal
8 April	Miramar Invitational	Ansin Sports Complex, Miramar	United States
29 April	Drake Relays	Drake Stadium, Des Moines	United States
6 May	Track Festival	Hilmer Lodge Stadium, Walnut	United States
13 May	Puerto Rico International Athletics Classic	Estadio Francisco Montaner, Ponce	Puerto Rico
28 May	58th International Pentecost Sport Meeting Rehlingen	Bungertstadion, Rehlingen	Germany
31 May	Athens Street Pole Vault	Syntagma Square, Athens	Greece
31 May	Montreuil International Meeting	Stade des Grands Pêchers, Montreuil	France
3 June	Racers Grand Prix	National Stadium, Kingston	Jamaica
3 June	Trond Mohn Games	Fana Stadion, Bergen	Norway
4 June	69° ORLEN Janusz Kusociński Memorial	Stadion Śląski, Chorzów	Poland
6 June	Filothei Women Gala	Filothei Stadium, Athens	Greece
17 June	Kuortane Games	Kuortaneen keskusurheilukenttä, Kuortane	Finland
17 June	NACAC New Life Invitational	Miramar	United States
18 June	Fly Olympia	Olympia	Greece
18 June	Meeting Stanislas Nancy	Stade Raymond Petit, Tomblaine	France
18 June	Poznań Athletics Grand Prix	Golęcin Stadion, Poznań	Poland
24 June	Manchester World Athletics Tour	Manchester Regional Arena, Manchester	United Kingdom
2 July	Edmonton Pre World Invitational	Foote Field, Edmonton	Canada
7 July	Meeting International de Soteville	Stade Sottevillais 76, Sotteville-lès-Rouen	France
20 July	P-T-S meeting 2023	Štadión SNP, Banská Bystrica	Slovakia
20 July	Spitzen Leichtathletik Luzern	Stadion Allmend, Luzern	Switzerland
22 July	Meeting Madrid	Estadio Vallehermoso, Madrid	Spain
4–5 August	Ed Murphey Classic	Wolfe Track & Field Complex, Memphis	United States
3 September	ISTAF	Olympiastadion, Berlin	Germany
4 September	Galà dei Castelli	Stadio Comunale, Bellinzona	Switzerland
6 September	59. Palio Città della Quercia	Stadio Quercia, Rovereto	Italy
BRONZE Meetings (56)
19 February	International Track Meet	Ngā Puna Wai Sports Hub, Christchurch	New Zealand
16 March	Sir Graeme Douglas International	Douglas Track & Field, Auckland	New Zealand
17 March	Meeting International	Djibouti City	Djibouti
1 April	Felix Sánchez Classic	Monte Plata	Dominican Republic
28–29 April	The Penn Relays Carnival	Franklin Field, Philadelphia	United States
29 April	57th Oda Mikio Memorial	Municipal Stadium, Hiroshima	Japan
3 May	39th Shizuoka International Athletics Meet	Prefectural Shizuoka Stadium, Fukuroi	Japan
6–7 May	10th Kinami Michitaka Memorial Athletics Meet	Yanmar Stadium Nagai, Osaka	Japan
10 May	Grande Prêmio Brasil Caixa de Atletismo	COTP Stadium, São Paulo	Brazil
19 May	Track Night NYC	Icahn Stadium, New York City	United States
24 May	Cyprus International Athletics Meeting	Tsirio Stadium, Limassol	Cyprus
24 May	International Jumping Meeting "Filahtlitikos Kallithea"	Grigoris Lambrakis Stadium, Kallithea	Greece
26 May	Meeting Jaen Paraiso Interior	Polideportivo Municipal, Andújar	Spain
28 May	Meeting International de Forbach	Stade Omnisports Schlossberg, Forbach	France
28 May	Venizelia - Chania International Meeting	Elena Venizelou National Stadium, Chania	Greece
31 May	International Marseille Meeting	Stade Delort, Marseille	France
3 June	Dromia International Sprint and Relays Meeting	Athens	Greece
5 June	Memorial Josef Odložil	Stadion Juliska, Prague	Czech Republic
6 June	Meeting Iberoamericano	Estadio Iberoamericano, Huelva	Spain
7 June	Copenhaguen Athletics Games	Østerbro Stadion, Copenhagen	Denmark
7 June	Jyväskylä Motonet GP	Harjun stadion, Jyväskylä	Finland
8 June	Hungarian GP Series - Budapest	Lantos Mihály Sportközpont, Budapest	Hungary
8 June	JBL Jump Fest	Košice	Slovakia
8 June	Jessheim 1500m Elite	Friidrettsstadion, Jessheim	Norway
8 June	Track'n'Field Meeting	Dortmund	Germany
10 June	Atletica Geneve - EAP	Centre sportif Bout-du-Monde, Geneva	Switzerland
11 June	Folksam Grand Prix Sollentuna	Sollentunavallen, Sollentuna	Sweden
11 June	Hungarian GP Series – Székesfehérvár	Bregyó Athletic Center, Székesfehérvár	Hungary
13 June	Kladno hází a Kladenské Memoriály 2022	Mestský Stadion Sletište, Kladno	Czech Republic
14 June	Serbia Athletics Meeting	Military Academy Stadium, Belgrade	Serbia
16 June	Heino Lipp Memorial – JÕHVI 2023	Vene Põhikooli staadion, Jõhvi	Estonia
17 June	25th International Athletics Meeting Anhalt 2023	Paul-Greifzu-Stadion, Dessau	Germany
17 June	27. ročník Brněnské laťky Olympie Brno	Nákupní centrum Olympia, Brno	Czech Republic
17 June	Meeting Nikaïa	Parc des Sports C. Ehrmann, Nice	France
18 June	Gothenburg Grand Prix	Slottsskogsvallen, Göteborg	Sweden
28 June	Boysen Memorial	Bislett Stadion, Oslo	Norway
1–2 July	XXXIII Qosanov Memorial	Central Stadium, Almaty	Kazakhstan
2 July	Pärnu Beach Stadium Meeting 2023	Rannastaadion, Pärnu	Estonia
5 July	Folksam Grand Prix Karlstad	Tingvalla IP, Karlstad	Sweden
5 July	Joensuu Motonet GP	Keskusurheilukenttä, Joensuu	Finland
5 July	Meeting International Montgeron-Essonne	Stade Pierre de Coubertin, Montgeron	France
8 July	Guldensporenmeeting	Sportcentrum Wembley, Kortrijk	Belgium
8 July	Motonet GP, Oulu – Games of Northern City	Raatin Stadion, Oulu	Finland
12 July	Meeting Internationald'Athletisme de la Province de Liège	Stade Naimette-Xhovémont, Liège	Belgium
14 July	Harry Jerome Track Classic	Swangard Stadium, Burnaby	Canada
14 July	Morton Games	Morton Stadium, Dublin	Ireland
15 July	Night of Athletics	Stadion De Veen, Heusden-Zolder	Belgium
19 July	Motonet GP Lappeenranta	Kimpisen yleisurheilukenttä, Lappeenranta	Finland
20 July	Cork City Sports	Munster Technological University Track, Cork	Ireland
26 July	Raiffeisen AUSTRIAN OPEN Eisenstadt	Leichtathletikarena, Eisenstadt	Austria
29 July	#True Athletes Classics 2023	Stadion Manfort, Leverkusen	Germany
4 August	CITIUS Meeting	Stadion Wankdorf, Bern	Switzerland
6 August	7. Ursapharm Speerwurfmeeting	ETSV Stadion, Offenburg	Germany
8 August	Tampere Motonet GP meeting	Ratina Stadium, Tampere	Finland
1 September	20. Internationaler Thumer Wefertage	Stadion an der Wiesenstraße, Thum	Germany
3 September	36th Meeting Città di Padova	Stadio Colbachini, Padova	Italy
30 September–1 October	Athletics Challenge Cup 2023	Denka Big Swan Stadium, Niigata	Japan
CHALLENGER Meetings (101)
21 January 2023	Potts Classic	Hawkes Bay Sports Park, Hastings	New Zealand
28 January 2023	Cooks Classic	Cooks Gardens, Wanganui	New Zealand
3 February 2023	Capital Classic	Newtown Park Stadium, Wellington	New Zealand
4 February 2023	Sola Power Throwers Meeting	Solapower Throwing Academy, Wellington	New Zealand
11 February 2023	Adelaide Track Classic	SA Athletic Stadium, Adelaide	Australia
9 March 2023	NSW Milers Series	The Crest Athletics Centre, Sydney	Australia
11 March 2023	Sydney Track Classic	SOPAC, Sydney	Australia
18–19 March 2023	17th Carolina Spring Break Classic	Pista Basilio Rodriguez, Carolina	Puerto Rico
25 March 2023	MVP Velocity Fest 12	National Stadium, Kingston	Jamaica
12 April 2023	ASA Athletics Grand Prix 1	Pilditch Stadium, Pretoria	South Africa
14 April 2023	Cape Milers Club/Endurocad Middle distance invitational 1	Green Point Stadium, Cape Town	South Africa
17 April 2023	Cape Milers Club/Endurocad Middle distance invitational 2	Green Point Stadium, Cape Town	South Africa
19 April 2023	ASA Athletics Grand Prix 2	Germiston Stadium, Johannesburg	South Africa
22 April 2023	MVP Velocity Fest 13	National Stadium, Kingston	Jamaica
22 April 2023	TOKYO Spring Challenge 2023	National Stadium, Tokyo	Japan
22 April 2023	Tropical Park Meet #1	Tropical Park Track, Miami	United States
22–23 April 2023	71st Hyogo Relay Carnival	Universiade Commemorative Stadium, Kobe	Japan
24 April 2023	Cape Milers Club/Endurocad Middle distance invitational 3	Green Point Stadium, Cape Town	South Africa
26 April 2023	ASA Athletics Grand Prix 3	McArthur Stadium, Potchefstroom	South Africa
5–7 May 2023	Oceania Relays	Sports Reserve, Townsville	Australia
13 May 2023	Belfast Irish Milers Meet	Mary Peters Track, Belfast	United Kingdom
13 May 2023	Meeting de Bamako	Bamako	Mali
13 May 2023	Vergoitia 2023	Andreas Vergotis Municipal Stadium, Argostoli	Greece
14 May 2023	Meeting der krummen Strecken	Schönbuchstadion, Pliezhausen	Germany
18 May 2023	Sparet 5000	Olympiastadion, Stockholm	Sweden
20 May 2023	Garden City International Grand Prix Port Harcourt	Port Harcourt	Nigeria
20 May 2023	Lang Laufnacht	Carl-Kaufmann-Stadion, Karlsruhe	Germany
20 May 2023	Ludwig-Jall-Sportfest	München	Germany
20–21 May 2023	Hallesche Werfertage	Werferzentrum Brandberge, Halle	Germany
21 May 2023	Mityng Gwiazd na Rynku Kościuszki	Białystok	Poland
21 May 2023	Papaflessia 2023	Ethnikou Stadiou, Kalamata	Greece
24 May 2023	12th International Meeting "Città Di Savona"	Centro Sportivo Fontanassa, Savona	Italy
27 May 2023	23rd International Athletics Meeting Slovenska Bistrica 2023	Športni park, Slovenska Bistrica	Slovenia
27 May 2023	British Milers Club Grand Prix – Manchester	Sportcity Regional Arena, Manchester	United Kingdom
27 May 2023	Estonian Throwing Series 2nd stage	Viimsi	Estonia
27 May 2023	IFAM Oordegem	Putbosstadion, Oordegem	Belgium
27 May 2023	Kurpfalz Gala	Sepp-Herberger-Stadion, Weinheim	Germany
27 May 2023	XIII International Meeting of "Castiglione Della Pescaia"	Stadio Zecchini, Grosseto	Italy
29 May 2023	Tropical Park Meet #2	Tropical Park Track, Miami	United States
2 June 2023	17. Schönebecker SoleCup	UNION-Stadion, Schönebeck	Germany
3 June 2023	Meeting Gala Fernanda Ribeiro	Estádio José Vieira de Carvalho, Maia	Portugal
3 June 2023	Meeting of Lisbon	Lisbon	Portugal
3 June 2023	Sparkassen Gala Regensburg	Universitätsstadion Am Biopark, Regensburg	Germany
7 June 2023	19.Int. Golden Roof Challenge	Maria-Theresien-Straße, Innsbruck	Austria
8 June 2023	Liese Prokop Memorial	Sportzentrum Niederösterreich, St. Pölten	Austria
9–11 June 2023	Touch the Clouds Festival	Gräfelfing	Germany
10 June 2023	14. Internationales Sparkassenmeeting	Jahnstadion, Osterode	Germany
10 June 2023	British Milers Club Grand Prix - Loughborough	Paula Radcliffe Stadium, Loughborough	United Kingdom
10 June 2023	Józef Żylewicz Memorial	Stadion GOS, Gdańsk	Poland
16 June 2023	Horst Mandl Memorial	Stadion Eggenberg Sprintgang, Graz	Austria
17 June 2023	Internationales Hochsprungmeeting	Zitadelle Spandau, Berlin	Germany
17 June 2023	Jump & Fly	Ernwiesenstadion, Mössingen	Germany
17 June 2023	Meeting Meilen	Allmend, Meilen	Switzerland
17 June 2023	Meeting of Braga	Estádio 1º de Maio, Braga	Portugal
18 June 2023	Tag der Überflieger	Bezirkssportanlage Überruhr, Essen	Germany
20 June 2023	XIXIO Pražská tyčka 2023	Praha	Czech Republic
21 June 2023	Royal City Inferno Track & Field Festival	Alumni Stadium, Guelph	Canada
24 June 2023	Int. Hofer Sparkassen Stabhochsprung	Altstadt, Hof	Germany
24 June 2023	Johnny Loaring Classic	Alumni Field, Windsor	Canada
24 June 2023	VII Ordizia Sari Nagusia - International Meeting Jose Antonio Peña	Altamira estadioa, Ordizia	Spain
25 June 2023	Internationales LAZ Meeting/Rhede	Rhede	Germany
29 June 2023	La Classique D’Athletisme De Montreal	Complexe Sportif Claude-Robillard, Montréal	Canada
30 June 2023	Täby Stavhoppsgala	Täby torg, Täby	Sweden
1 July 2023	British Milers Club Grand Prix - Watford	Woodside Stadium, Watford	United Kingdom
1 July 2023	Meeting Internazionale Citta' Di Nembro	Centro Sportivo Saletti, Nembro	Italy
1 July 2023	Meeting National d'Athlétisme de Troyes	Stade d'Athletisme Pierre Voillequin, Troyes	France
2 July 2023	Bauhaus Challenger Meeting	Olympiastadion, Stockholm	Sweden
2 July 2023	Keihäskarnevaalit – Javelin Carnival	Urheilukenttä, Pihtipudas	Finland
2 July 2023	Résisprint International	Stade de la Charrière, La Chaux-de-Fonds	Switzerland
5 July 2023	Míting Internacional d'Atletisme Ciutat de Barcelona	Estadi Joan Serrahima, Barcelona	Spain
8 July 2023	EAP – Malta International Meet	Marsa Athletics Track, Marsa	Malta
8 July 2023	Meeting Maia Cidade do Desporto	Estádio José Vieira de Carvalho, Maia	Portugal
14 July 2023	Meeting Sport e Solidarieta Lignano	Stadio G. Teghil, Lignano Sabbiadoro	Italy
15 July 2023	Grand Prix Nové Mesto Nad Metují	General Klapálek ́s stadium, Nové Město nad Metují	Czech Republic
15 July 2023	Int. Rottacher Stabhochsprungmeeting	Spa park, Rottach-Egern	Germany
15 July 2023	Meeting International de Yaoundé	Yaoundé	Cameroon
15–16 July 2023	AAI Games	Tullamore Harriers AC Stadium, Tullamore	Ireland
15–16 July 2023	Bottnarydskastet	Bottnaryds IP, Bottnaryd	Sweden
16 July 2023	Meeting International de Tunis	Tunis	Tunisia
16 July 2023	Victoria International Track Classic	Centennial Stadium, Victoria	Canada
19 July 2023	34th Meeting Arcobaleno EAP AtleticaEuropa	Centro Sportivo G. Olmo-P. Ferro, Celle Ligure	Italy
22 July 2023	16º Triveneto Meeting Internationale	Stadio Giuseppe Grezar, Trieste	Italy
22 July 2023	PUMA fast arms, fast legs	Enwag-Stadion, Wetzlar	Germany
22 July 2023	Sommerspringen in Merzig	Gymnasium am Stefansberg, Merzig	Germany
24–25 July 2023	Festspiele der Weltklasse	Domplatz, Erfurt	Germany
29 July 2023	1. Internationales Stuttgarter Leichtathletik-Meeting	Stadion Festwiese, Stuttgart	Germany
29 July 2023	British Milers Club Grand Prix – Birmingham University	Birmingham University Athletics Track, Birmingham	United Kingdom
29 July 2023	Loughborough EAP	Loughborough University Track, Loughborough	United Kingdom
30 July 2023	30. midsommar – Charlottenburger-Mittsommernacht	Mommsenstadion, Berlin	Germany
5 August 2023	Folksam Grand Prix Malmö	Kastplan/Malmö Stadion, Malmö	Sweden
11–13 August 2023	Norgeslekene	Friidrettsstadion, Jessheim	Norway
12 August 2023	BMC Grand Prix Trafford, Manchester	Trafford Athletic Stadium, Manchester	United Kingdom
12 August 2023	BMW Louyet Meeting	Provincial domain Huizingen, Huizingen	Belgium
13 August 2023	16. ročník Hvězdného házení	Městský stadion Střelnice, Domažlice	Czech Republic
26 August 2023	Lohrheide-Meeting	Lohrheidestadion, Wattenscheid, Bochum	Germany
26 August 2023	The Monument Mile Classic	University of Stirling Track, Stirling	United Kingdom
30 August 2023	Grand Prix Sopotu Im. Janusza Sidly	Forest Stadium, Sopot	Poland
31 August 2023	St. Wendeler City Jump 2023	Schloßplatz, St. Wendel	Germany
6 September 2023	6. Memoriał Wiesława Maniaka	Miejski Stadion, Szczecin	Poland
6 September 2023	NetAachen Domspringen	Katschhof, Aachen	Germany
10 September 2023	International Pole Vault for Women	Jahnstadion, Beckum	Germany
