= 2025 World Athletics Continental Tour =

- Organisers: World Athletics
- Edition: 6th
- Dates: 25 January – 25 October

The 2025 World Athletics Continental Tour, also known as the 2025 Continental Tour, was the 6th season of the annual series of outdoor track and field meetings organised by World Athletics. The Tour forms the second tier of international one-day meetings after the 2025 Diamond League.

The Continental Tour was divided into subgroups and categories – Gold (A), Silver (B), Bronze (C) and Challenger (D) – each of which have different levels of competition and different prize offerings.

== Schedule ==
| Date | Meeting | Venue | Country |
|---|---|---|---|
Gold (11)
| 27 Mar | Maurie Plant Meet | Melbourne | Australia |
| 24 Apr | Kip Keino Classic | Nairobi | Kenya |
| 17 May | Seiko Golden Grand Prix | Tokyo | Japan |
| 29 May | Irena Szewinska Memorial | Bydgoszcz | Poland |
| 3 Jun | Paavo Nurmi Games | Turku | Finland |
| 6 Jun | USATF Lone Star Grand Prix | College Station | United States |
| 13 Jun | USATF Los Angeles Grand Prix | Los Angeles | United States |
| 16 Jun | Ostrava Golden Spike | Ostrava | Czech Republic |
| 21 Jun | FBK Games | Hengelo | Netherlands |
| 26 Jun | 76. Boris Hanžeković Memorial | Zagreb | Croatia |
| 14 Jul | Gyulai István Memorial - Hungarian Athletics Grand Prix | Budapest | Hungary |
Silver (45)
| 28 Mar | The TEN | San Juan Capistrano | United States |
| 4 Apr | Miramar Invitational | Miramar | United States |
| 20 Apr | Drake Relays Vault at Jordan Creek | Des Moines | United States |
| 22 Apr | 116th Drake Relays | Des Moines | United States |
| 23 Apr | Penn Relay Carnival | Philadelphia | United States |
| 26 Apr | Botswana Golden Grand Prix | Gaborone | Botswana |
| 28 Apr | Simbine Classic | Pretoria | South Africa |
| 17 May | Coqui International Cup | Caguas | Puerto Rico |
| 18 May | The 4th Belt and Road Athletics Invitational Meeting | Chongqing | China |
| 23 May | LA Track Festival | Los Angeles | United States |
| 23 May | Tucson Elite Throws | Tucson | United States |
| 24 May | Internationales Pfingstsportfest Rehlingen | Rehlingen | Germany |
| 27 May | Canarias Athletics Invitational | Santa Cruz de Tenerife | Spain |
| 27 May | JBL Jump Fest | Košice | Slovakia |
| 28 May | Trond Mohn Games | Bergen | Norway |
| 30 May | Grand Prix International CAA de Douala | Douala | Cameroon |
| 31 May | Goldenes Oval | Dresden | Germany |
| 6 Jun | New Taipei City Athletics Open | New Taipei City | Chinese Taipei |
| 20 Jun | Tag der Überflieger | Essen | Germany |
| 25 Jun | Brněnská Laťka Olympia | Brno | Czech Republic |
| 25 Jun | Grand Slam Jerusalem | Jerusalem | Israel |
| 28 Jun | Czesław Cybulski Memorial | Poznań | Poland |
| 28 Jun | Piraeus Street Long Jump | Piraeus | Greece |
| 1 Jul | Perche des Alpes | Montbonnot-Saint-Martin | France |
| 1 Jul | Raiffeisen Austrian Open Eisenstadt | Eisenstadt | Austria |
| 3 Jul | Meeting Stanislas Nancy | Tomblaine | France |
| 5 Jul | Fly Athens | Athens | Greece |
| 5 Jul | Opolski Festiwal Skoków | Opole | Poland |
| 10 Jul | Ed Murphey Classic | Memphis | United States |
| 11 Jul | Sunset Tour | Los Angeles | United States |
| 12 Jul | Edmonton Athletics Invitational | Edmonton | Canada |
| 16 Jul | Meeting Madrid | Madrid | Spain |
| 16 Jul | Spitzen Leichtathletik Luzern | Luzern | Switzerland |
| 21 Jul | TIPOS P-T-S Meeting | Banská Bystrica | Slovakia |
| 23 Jul | WACT Silver Hammer Throw Competition | Szombathely | Hungary |
| 5 Aug | Monaco Athletics Festival | Monaco | Monaco |
| 17 Aug | Golden Sand | Międzyzdroje | Poland |
| 22 Aug | Felix Sanchez Classic | Santo Domingo | Dominican Republic |
| 29 Aug | Internationales Hochsprungmeeting Heilbronn | Heilbronn | Germany |
| 30 Aug | Galà dei Castelli | Bellinzona | Switzerland |
| 30 Aug | Grand Prix Brescia | Brescia | Italy |
| 30 Aug | ISTAF Berlin | Berlin | Germany |
| 8 Sep | Palio Città della Quercia | Rovereto | Italy |
| 18 Sep | ORLEN Janusz Kusocinski Memorial | Chorzów | Poland |
Bronze (90)
| 24 Jan | Pak'n Save Cooks International Classic | Whanganui | New Zealand |
| 8 Feb | Sir Graeme Douglas International | Auckland | New Zealand |
| 14 Feb | Perth Track Classic | Perth | Australia |
| 21 Feb | International Track Meet | Christchurch | New Zealand |
| 28 Feb | Hobart Track Classic | Hobart | Australia |
| 13 Mar | Adelaide Invitational | Adelaide | Australia |
| 10 Apr | Oklahoma Throws Series World Invitational | Ramona | United States |
| 15 Apr | Mt. SAC Relays | Walnut | United States |
| 17 Apr | Meeting International de Djibouti | Djibouti | Djibouti |
| 18 Apr | Addis Ababa Grand Prix | Addis Ababa | Ethiopia |
| 19 Apr | Continental Tour Orlando Guaita | Santiago | Chile |
| 29 Apr | Oda Mikio Memorial | Hiroshima | Japan |
| 3 May | Shizuoka International Athletics Meet | Fukuroi | Japan |
| 8 May | Ročník Hvězdného Házení | Domažlice | Czech Republic |
| 10 May | Kinami Michitaka Memorial Athletics Meet | Osaka | Japan |
| 15 May | Saudi Athletics Grand Prix | Riyadh | Saudi Arabia |
| 20 May | Savona International Meeting | Savona | Italy |
| 23 May | IFAM Outdoor | Brussels | Belgium |
| 24 May | Lisek w domu International Pole Vault Meeting | Duszniki | Poland |
| 27 May | Filathlitikos Kallitheas International Jumping Meeting | Kallithea | Greece |
| 29 May | Cyprus International Athletics Meeting | Limassol | Cyprus |
| 30 May | Twolaps Middle Distance Circuit | Tokyo | Japan |
| 31 May | Bob Vigars Classic | London | Canada |
| 31 May | Meeting International de Forbach | Forbach | France |
| 31 May | Mityng na Rynku w Białymstoku | Białystok | Poland |
| 31 May | Venizeleia-Chania International Meeting | Chania | Greece |
| 1 Jun | Josef Odložil Memorial | Prague | Czech Republic |
| 3 Jun | Filothei Women Gala | Athens | Greece |
| 3 Jun | Royal City Inferno Track and Field Festival | Guelph | Canada |
| 4 Jun | Liese Prokop Memorial | St. Pölten | Austria |
| 5 Jun | 1500m Elite Jessheim | Jessheim | Norway |
| 5 Jun | Touch the Clouds Festival | Gräfelfing | Germany |
| Cancelled | ~~FAST5000~~ | Maisons-Laffitte | France |
| 7 Jun | Sparkassen Werfertag | Gelenau | Germany |
| 7 Jun | Halina Konopacka Classic | Warsaw | Poland |
| 7 Jun | Johnny Loaring Classic | Windsor | Canada |
| 9 Jun | Kladno hází a Kladenské Memoriály | Kladno | Czech Republic |
| 10 Jun | Motonet GP Lahti | Lahti | Finland |
| 13 Jun | Dromia Sprint and Relays Meeting | Vari | Greece |
| 13 Jun | Hong Kong Athletics Open | Hong Kong | Hong Kong |
| 13 Jun | Meeting Nikaia | Nice | France |
| 14 Jun | EUROWINGS Flight Circus | Düsseldorf | Germany |
| 14 Jun | Folksam Grand Prix Sollentuna | Sollentuna | Sweden |
| 16 Jun | Heino Lipp Memorial | Jõhvi | Estonia |
| 17 Jun | COSMA Cup World Athletics Continental Tour | Palanga | Lithuania |
| 17 Jun | Meeting International de Montreuil | Montreuil | France |
| 18 Jun | Grand Prix Ústí nad Labem | Ústí nad Labem | Czech Republic |
| 18 Jun | Iron Wood Classic | Rathdrum | United States |
| 19 Jun | Anhalt Meeting Dessau | Dessau | Germany |
| 19 Jun | Meeting International Montgeron-Essonne | Montgeron | France |
| 20 Jun | Schönebecker SoleCup | Schönebeck | Germany |
| 20 Jun | ATX Classic | Georgetown | United States |
| 20 Jun | Bottnarydskastet International | Bottnaryd | Sweden |
| 20 Jun | Motonet GP Kuortane | Kuortane | Finland |
| 20 Jun | Korea Athletics Open | Yecheon | South Korea |
| 20 Jun | Portland Track Festival | Portland | United States |
| 21 Jun | Hylo Javelin Meeting | Offenburg | Germany |
| 22 Jun | Copenhagen Athletics Games | Copenhagen | Denmark |
| 24 Jun | Boysen Memorial | Oslo | Norway |
| 24 Jun | TIPOS Atletické Kritérium SNP | Banská Bystrica | Slovakia |
| 26 Jun | RFFA - Rotterdam Festival For Athletics | Rotterdam | Netherlands |
| 27 Jun | LA Throws Cup | Wilmington | United States |
| 28 Jun | Meeting International d'Athlétisme de Troyes Aube | Troyes | France |
| 30 Jun | La Classique d'athlétisme de Montréal | Montreal | Canada |
| 30 Jun | Qosanov Memorial | Astana | Kazakhstan |
| 4 Jul | Continental Tour Memorial Alex Quiñonez | Cuenca | Ecuador |
| 4 Jul | Meeting Maia Cidade do Desporto | Maia | Portugal |
| 4 Jul | Ordizia Meeting - International Meeting Jose Antonio Peña | Ordizia | Spain |
| 5 Jul | Fuse Sprint | Tottori | Japan |
| 8 Jul | Cork City Sports International Athletics | Cork | Ireland |
| 8 Jul | Folksam Grand Prix Karlstad | Karlstad | Sweden |
| 8 Jul | Joensuu Motonet GP | Joensuu | Finland |
| 8 Jul | Meeting Sport e Solidarietà Lignano | Lignano Sabbiadoro | Italy |
| 10 Jul | Morton Games | Dublin | Ireland |
| 11 Jul | Grand Prix Nove Město nad Metují | Nové Město nad Metují | Czech Republic |
| 11 Jul | Meeting of Braga | Braga | Portugal |
| 11 Jul | Moore-Guldensporenmeeting | Kortrijk | Belgium |
| 12 Jul | Tampere Meeting | Tampere | Finland |
| 14 Jul | Harry Jerome Track Classic | Burnaby | Canada |
| 15 Jul | Meeting International d'Athlétisme de la Province de Liège | Liège | Belgium |
| 15 Jul | Athletics Meeting "Kostas Spanidis" | Thessaloniki | Greece |
| 18 Jul | Night of Athletics | Heusden-Zolder | Belgium |
| 1 Aug | IFAM Oordegem | Oordegem | Belgium |
| 10 Aug | Indian Open | Bhubaneswar | India |
| 19 Aug | Espoo Motonet GP | Espoo | Finland |
| 24 Aug | Folksam Grand Prix Göteborg | Gothenburg | Sweden |
| 26 Aug | International Wiesław Maniak Memorial | Szczecin | Poland |
| 30 Aug | Memorial Zbigniewa Ludwichowskiego | Olsztyn | Poland |
| 1 Sep | UAE Athletics Grand Prix | Dubai | United Arab Emirates |
| 2 Sep | Serbia Athletics Meeting | Belgrade | Serbia |
| 5 Sep | Oman Athletics Grand Prix | Muscat | Oman |
Challenger (146)
| 17 Jan | Allan & Sylvia Potts Classic | Hastings | New Zealand |
| 23 Feb | Egypt Winter Cup | Ismailia | Egypt |
| 4 Mar | MTN CHAMPS Athletics Classics | Calabar | Nigeria |
| 13 Mar | 20th Carolina Spring Break Classic | Carolina | Puerto Rico |
| 21 Mar | Maseru International Meet | Maseru | Lesotho |
| 21 Mar | Velocity Fest #18 | Kingston | Jamaica |
| 26 Mar | MTN CHAMPS Continental Relays | Jos | Nigeria |
| 1 Apr | Clyde Littlefield Texas Relays | Austin | United States |
| 3 Apr | Pepsi Florida Relays | Gainesville | United States |
| 7 Apr | Hezekiel Sepeng Invitational | Potchefstroom | South Africa |
| 9 Apr | 44 Farms Team Invitational | College Station | United States |
| 9 Apr | Bryan Clay Invitational | Azusa | United States |
| 10 Apr | Cape Miller Continental Tour | Stellenbosch | South Africa |
| 11 Apr | Road-To-Botswana Golden Grand Prix | Gaborone | Botswana |
| 15 Apr | MTN CHAMPS Grand Final | Ibadan | Nigeria |
| 16 Apr | Tom Jones Memorial | Gainesville | United States |
| 18 Apr | Challenger Continental Tour Ciudad de Buenos Aires | Buenos Aires | Argentina |
| 18 Apr | Nurullah Ivak Throwing Cup | İzmir | Turkey |
| 19 Apr | Challenger Continental Tour Hugo M. La Nasa | Buenos Aires | Argentina |
| 19 Apr | Velocity Fest #19 | Kingston | Jamaica |
| 25 Apr | Grand Prix Estrella Puente | Montevideo | Uruguay |
| 25 Apr | National Athletics Grand Prix 1 | Zhaoqing | China |
| 26 Apr | Grand Prix Darwin Piñeyrúa | Montevideo | Uruguay |
| 2 May | LSU Invitational | Baton Rouge | United States |
| 3 May | ESET WMD-Night | Busto Arsizio | Italy |
| 9 May | International Pegaso Meeting | Florence | Italy |
| 9 May | Portland Twilight | Portland | United States |
| 9 May | Ter Specke Bokaal | Lisse | Netherlands |
| 9 May | The Belfast Classic | Belfast | United Kingdom |
| 9 May | National Athletics Grand Prix 2 | Jiaxing | China |
| 14 May | KPMG Prague Night of PBs | Prague | Czech Republic |
| 15 May | Grand Prix Memorial Brigido Iriarte | Caracas | Venezuela |
| 16 May | British Milers Club Grand Prix | Manchester | United Kingdom |
| 16 May | Meeting de Atletismo Toni Bonet | Ibiza | Spain |
| 16 May | Next Generation Athletics | Nijmegen | Netherlands |
| 16 May | Saudi Athletics Challenger | Riyadh | Saudi Arabia |
| 16 May | Vergotia 2026 | Argostoli | Greece |
| 16 May | Halplus Werfertage | Halle (Saale) | Germany |
| 17 May | Grand Prix Memorial Maximo Viloria | Barquisimeto | Venezuela |
| 17 May | Internationales Läufermeeting | Pliezhausen | Germany |
| 20 May | Desafio Nerja | Nerja | Spain |
| 20 May | Egypt Athletics Grand Prix | Ismailia | Egypt |
| 22 May | Kifisia Jump | Kifisia | Greece |
| 23 May | Pfingstmeeting | Zofingen | Switzerland |
| 23 May | Spåret 5000m | Stockholm | Sweden |
| 23 May | TIPOS Challenge Slovakia | Martin | Slovakia |
| 23 May | Int. Sparkassen Hammerwurf-Meeting | Fränkisch-Crumbach | Germany |
| 24 May | Alexandrino Meeting - Georgios Pantos Memorial | Alexandreia | Greece |
| 26 May | Memoriál Ludvíka Daňka | Turnov | Czech Republic |
| 29 May | Internationales Marktplatzspringen Recklinghausen | Recklinghausen | Germany |
| 29 May | Meeting National de Seine et Marne | Fontainebleau | France |
| 29 May | Music City Track Carnival | Cleveland | United States |
| 30 May | PUMA NITRO Lange Laufnacht | Karlsruhe | Germany |
| 30 May | Triveneto Meeting Internazionale | Trieste | Italy |
| 30 May | British Milers Club Grand Prix | Birmingham | United Kingdom |
| 30 May | Busan International Pole Vault Meeting | Busan | South Korea |
| 30 May | National Athletics Grand Prix 4 | Bengbu | China |
| 31 May | Mednarodni Atletski Miting Ptuj in Memorial Roberta Preloga | Ptuj | Slovenia |
| 2 Jun | EAP Atletica 2000 Meeting | San Vito al Tagliamento | Italy |
| 3 Jun | Granada Challenger | Granada | Spain |
| 4 Jun | Memorial Matica Šušteršiča in Patrika Cvetana | Maribor | Slovenia |
| 4 Jun | HOKA Festival of Miles | St. Louis | United States |
| 4 Jun | Memorial José Barrientos | Havana | Cuba |
| 5 Jun | Int. Sparkassenmeeting Osterode | Osterode | Germany |
| 5 Jun | Täby Stavhoppsgala | Täby | Sweden |
| 6 Jun | Gorzów Meeting | Gorzów Wielkopolski | Poland |
| 6 Jun | Izmir Cup | İzmir | Turkey |
| 6 Jun | Papaflessia | Kalamata | Greece |
| 6 Jun | The Lightning 10.000 | Stadtallendorf | Germany |
| 6 Jun | National Athletics Grand Prix 5 | Huangshi | China |
| 7 Jun | Lucca International Meeting | Lucca | Italy |
| 7 Jun | The Adrian Martinez Classic | Concord | United States |
| 10 Jun | Meeting Cidade de Lisboa | Lisbon | Portugal |
| 10 Jun | Meeting de Marseille | Marseille | France |
| 10 Jun | Miting Celjskih Knezov | Celje | Slovenia |
| 10 Jun | Salix Sub Astra | Vrbovec | Croatia |
| 13 Jun | Int. Golden Roof Challenge | Innsbruck | Austria |
| 13 Jun | British Milers Club Grand Prix | Loughborough | United Kingdom |
| 13 Jun | EAP Malta International | Marsa | Malta |
| 13 Jun | Envol Trophée | Pierre-Bénite | France |
| 13 Jun | Fly in SKG Sky | Thessaloniki | Greece |
| 13 Jun | Gouden Spike Meeting | Leiden | Netherlands |
| 13 Jun | Meeting d'athlétisme de Poitiers | Poitiers | France |
| 14 Jun | Janusz Sidło Memorial Grand Prix of Sopot | Sopot | Poland |
| 16 Jun | Lundahoppet | Lund | Sweden |
| 17 Jun | Långlöparnas Kväll | Stockholm | Sweden |
| 18 Jun | Meeting Internacional Ciudad de Málaga | Málaga | Spain |
| 20 Jun | Festival Lancers | Salon-de-Provence | France |
| 20 Jun | Meeting Annecy | Annecy | France |
| 20 Jun | Track Night Vienna | Vienna | Austria |
| 21 Jun | WGV Leichtathletikfestival | Stuttgart | Germany |
| 23 Jun | NetAachen Domspringen | Aachen | Germany |
| 24 Jun | Meeting de Bordeaux | Bordeaux | France |
| 26 Jun | CTFL Finals Presented by Ottawa Lions | Ottawa | Canada |
| 27 Jun | Internationales Hofer Sparkassen Stabhochsprung-Meeting | Hof | Germany |
| 27 Jun | Immobel International Athletics Meeting of Nivelles | Nivelles | Belgium |
| 27 Jun | Keihaskarnevaalit | Pihtipudas | Finland |
| 27 Jun | Meeting International de Carquefou | Carquefou | France |
| 27 Jun | The Village Power Shot | Modipane | Botswana |
| 28 Jun | Korzo Jump | Varaždin | Croatia |
| 30 Jun | Fribourg International Meeting | Fribourg | Switzerland |
| 1 Jul | Mednarodni miting Novo Mesto | Novo Mesto | Slovenia |
| 1 Jul | Challenger Game Oulu | Oulu | Finland |
| 1 Jul | GP Diputación Castellón - Memorial José Antonio Cansino | Castellón de la Plana | Spain |
| 1 Jul | Gran Prix Internacional "Richard Boroto" | Cuenca | Ecuador |
| 3 Jul | Classique d'Athlétisme de Québec | Quebec City | Canada |
| 4 Jul | Meeting National Est Lyonnais | Décines-Charpieu | France |
| 4 Jul | Meeting voor Mon - Polsstokgala | Leuven | Belgium |
| 4 Jul | Meeting International Bouvet-Bionda | Thonon-les-Bains | France |
| 7 Jul | Míting Internacional Ciutat de Barcelona | Barcelona | Spain |
| 10 Jul | PUMA Fast Arms Fast Legs | Wetzlar | Germany |
| 10 Jul | The Elliott Denman N.J. International | West Long Branch | United States |
| Rejected | ~~Memoriál Josefa Hájka~~ | Kolín | Czech Republic |
| 11 Jul | Cezmi Or Cup | Istanbul | Turkey |
| 11 Jul | Aleksander Lohu Memorial | Tallinn | Estonia |
| 11 Jul | British Milers Club Grand Prix | Watford | United Kingdom |
| 11 Jul | Vulcan Vault | Pelham | United States |
| 11 Jul | World Jump Day | Linz | Austria |
| 12 Jul | Klaverblad International High Jump Meeting | Zoetermeer | Netherlands |
| 12 Jul | MAIF Hoppet | Mariestad | Sweden |
| 12 Jul | Stumptown Twilight | Portland | United States |
| 15 Jul | Athletics Meeting "Kostas Spanidis" | Thessaloniki | Greece |
| 16 Jul | Meeting Arcobaleno EAP AtleticaEuropa | Celle Ligure | Italy |
| 16 Jul | Nordic High Jump Challenge | Bergen | Norway |
| 18 Jul | Dauphin Street Vault | Mobile | United States |
| Cancelled | ~~Horst Mandl Memorial~~ | Graz | Austria |
| 18 Jul | Lappeenranta Games | Lappeenranta | Finland |
| 18 Jul | National Athletics Grand Prix - Final | Yulin | China |
| 7 Aug | Sir Walter Miler | Raleigh | United States |
| 8 Aug | British Milers Club Grand Prix | Twickenham | United Kingdom |
| 8 Aug | Ndola International Meet | Ndola | Zambia |
| 19 Aug | Atletický Mítink Rieter | Ústí nad Orlicí | Czech Republic |
| 20 Aug | Tyczka na Molo | Sopot | Poland |
| 22 Aug | Asta in Piazza Aosta | Aosta | Italy |
| 26 Aug | Natanya Festival | Netanya | Israel |
| 29 Aug | Lisek i Przyjaciele Szczecin Pole Vault Meeting | Szczecin | Poland |
| 29 Aug | Speerwerpersfestival | Sint-Niklaas | Belgium |
| 30 Aug | International Pole Vault Meeting for Women | Beckum | Germany |
| 2 Sep | UAE Athletics Women's Gala | Dubai | United Arab Emirates |
| 3 Sep | Velká cena Chebu | Cheb | Czech Republic |
| 5 Sep | The Monument Mile Classic | Stirling | United Kingdom |
| 8 Sep | Dinamo Zrinjevac - International Athletics Meeting | Zagreb | Croatia |
| 26 Sep | Romanian International Pole Vault Gala | Bucharest | Romania |
| 31 Oct | Grand Prix del Paraguay | Luque | Paraguay |
