= Adelaide Invitational =

Outdoor athletics meet in Australia

The Adelaide Invitational (formerly Adelaide Track Classic) is an annual one-day outdoor track and field meeting held in Adelaide, Australia. It is part of the national Australian Athletics Tour alongside other competitions including the Sydney Track Classic. The Adelaide Invitational also features as part of the World Athletics Continental Tour, first featuring in the 2022 edition as a challenger level meet (also referred to as category D).

== Editions ==
Adelaide Invitational editions
Year	Title	Venue	Date	Status
1980	Alcoa Challenge Series - Adelaide	Olympic Sports Field	25 January 1980	
1981	Alcoa Challenge Series - Adelaide	Olympic Sports Field	14 December 1980	
1982				
1983				
1984				
1985				
1986				
1987	Australia Day Invitational	Olympic Sports Field	26 January 1987	
1988	Adelaide Games	Olympic Sports Field	9 February 1988	
1989	Adelaide Games	Olympic Sports Field	1 February 1989	
1990	Adelaide Games	Olympic Sports Field	14 March 1990	
1991	Sugar Games	Olympic Sports Field	15 February 1991	
1992	Sugar Games	Olympic Sports Field	16 February 1992	
1993	Sugar Games	Olympic Sports Field	14 February 1993	
1994	Mars Challenge	Olympic Sports Field	11 February 1994	
1995	Optus Grand Prix - Adelaide	Olympic Sports Field	26 January 1995	
1996	Optus Grand Prix - Adelaide	Olympic Sports Field	26 January 1996	
1997	Optus Grand Prix - Adelaide		1 February 1997	
1998	Optus Grand Prix - Adelaide	Mile End Athletics Stadium	26 January 1998	
1999	Optus Grand Prix - Adelaide	Mile End Athletics Stadium	26 January 1999	
2000	Optus Grand Prix Final - Adelaide	Mile End Athletics Stadium	8 March 2000	
2001	not held			
2002	Telstra A-series - Adelaide	Santos Stadium	23 March 2002	
2003	Telstra A-series - Adelaide	Santos Stadium	6 February 2003	IAAF Areas Permit Meet
2004	not held			
2005	Telstra A-series - Adelaide		19 February 2005	
2006	not held			
2007	not held			
2008	not held			
2009	not held			
2010				
2011				
2012	Adelaide Track Classic	Santos Stadium	28 January 2012	
2013	Adelaide Track Classic	Santos Stadium	16 February 2013	
2014	Adelaide Track Classic	Santos Stadium	15 February 2014	
2015	Adelaide Track Classic	Santos Stadium	21 February 2015	
2016	Adelaide Track Classic	Santos Stadium	20 February 2016	
2017				
2018				
2019				
2020				
2021				
2022	Adelaide Invitational	SA Athletics Stadium	12 February 2022	Continental Tour Challenger
2023	Adelaide Invitational	SA Athletics Stadium	11 February 2023	Continental Tour Challenger
2024	Adelaide Invitational	SA Athletics Stadium	10 February 2024	Continental Tour Bronze Meeting
2025	Adelaide Invitational	SA Athletics Stadium	15 February 2025	Continental Tour Bronze Meeting
2026	Adelaide Invitational	SA Athletics Stadium	13–14 March 2026	Continental Tour Bronze Meeting

== Meeting records ==
=== Men ===
Men's meeting records of the Adelaide Invitational
Event	Record	Athlete	Nationality	Date	Ref.
100 metres	10.12 (+0.9 m/s)	Rohan Browning	Australia	12 February 2022	
200 metres	20.43 (−1.3 m/s)	Aidan Murphy	Australia	14 March 2026	
400 metres	45.21	Luke van Ratingen	Australia	14 March 2026	
800 metres	1:44.37	Daniel Williams	Australia	14 March 2026	
1500 metres	3:34.55	Cameron Myers	Australia	10 February 2024	
3000 metres	7:45.57	Peter O'Donoghue	Australia	1993	
5000 metres	13:23.07	Luke Kipkosgei	Kenya	1998	
110 m hurdles					
400 metres hurdles	49.29	Simon Hollingsworth	Australia	1996	
3000 metres steeplechase	8:25.80	Ben Buckingham	Australia	11 February 2023	
High jump					
Pole vault	5.86 m	Dmitri Markov	Belarus	1997	
Long jump					
Triple jump	17.18 m	Andrew Murphy	Australia	1997	
Shot put					
Discus throw	67.99 m	Matthew Denny	Australia	14 March 2026	
Javelin throw					
Hammer throw					
4 × 100 m relay	38.34	Lachlan Kennedy; Joshua Azzopardi; Christopher Ius; Jacob Despard	Australia	14 March 2026	
4 × 400 m relay	3:06.79		Australia	1996	

=== Women ===
Men's meeting records of the Adelaide Invitational
Event	Record	Athlete	Nationality	Date	Ref.
100 metres	11.20	Gloria Kemasuode	Nigeria	2003	
200 metres	22.73	Cathy Freeman	Australia	1993	
400 metres	52.22	Jemma Pollard	Australia	14 March 2026	
800 metres	2:00.04	Abbey Caldwell	Australia	14 March 2026	
1500 metres	4:04.45	Claudia Hollingsworth	Australia	10 February 2024	
3000 metres					
5000 metres	15:13.35	Isobel Batt-Doyle	Australia	12 February 2022	
100 m hurdles					
400 metres hurdles					
3000 m steeplechase	9:34.89	Cara Feain-Ryan	Australia	14 March 2026	
High jump					
Pole vault	4.61 m	Alana Boyd	Australia	2012	
Long jump	6.67 m	Nicole Boegman	Australia	1998	
Triple jump	14.42 m	Baya Rahouli	Algeria	2000	
Shot put	16.50 m	Ana Po'uhila	Tonga	2005	
Discus throw	65.20 m	Dani Samuels	Australia	2015	
Hammer throw	71.12 m	Bronwyn Eagles	Australia	2003	
Javelin throw	66.12 m	Kim Mickle	Australia	2014	
4 × 100 m relay	43.37	Ebony Lane; Monique Hanlon; Olivia Rose Inkster; Chloe Mannix-Power	Australia	14 March 2026	
4 × 400 m relay	3:39.72		Australia	1995	
