= Brisbane Track Classic =

Annual outdoor track meeting

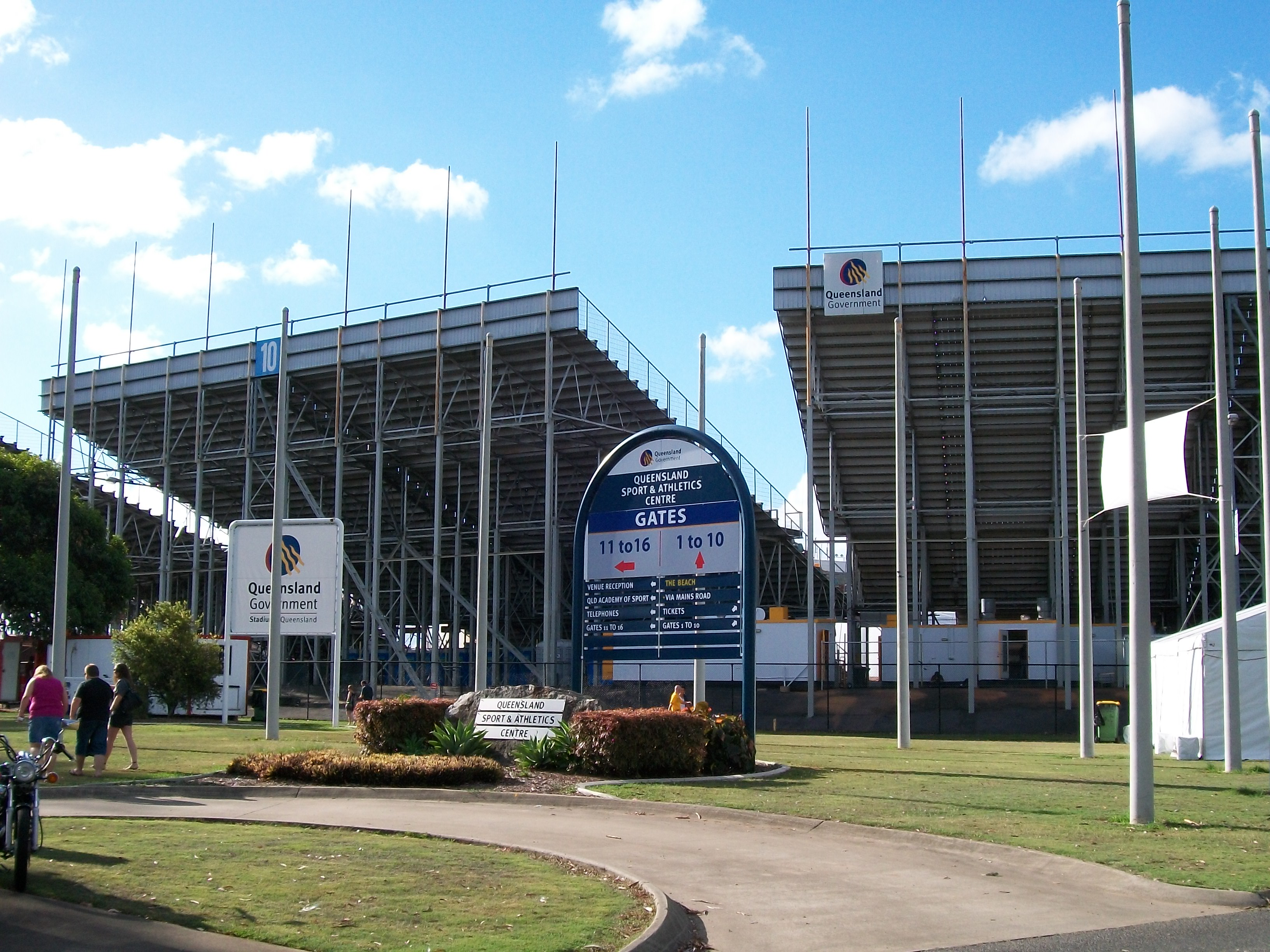
- The Queensland Sport and Athletics Centre which contains the meet venue
- Date: Annually in March/April
- Location: Brisbane, Australia
- Event type: Track and field

The Brisbane Track Classic is an annual outdoor track and field meeting usually held in March or April at the Queensland Sport and Athletics Centre in the suburb of Mount Gravatt in Brisbane, Australia. It is part of the national Australian Athletics Tour, alongside the Melbourne Track Classic and the Sydney Track Classic.

== Editions ==
Brisbane Track Classic editions
Year	Title	Venue	Date	Status
1980	Alcoa Challenge Series - Brisbane	QE II Stadium	16 December 1979	
1981	Alcoa Challenge Series - Brisbane	QE II Stadium	1 March 1981	
1982				
1983				
1984				
1985				
1986				
1987				
1988	International Meet	QE II Stadium	13 March 1988	
1989	AIS Drug Offensive	QE II Stadium	12 February 1989	
1990	Mobil Grand Prix	QE II Stadium	18 March 1990	
1991	Sugar Games	QE II Stadium	2 February 1991	
1992	Sugar Games	QE II Stadium	1 February 1992	
1993	Sugar Games	QE II Stadium	31 January 1993	
1994	Mars Challenge	QE II Stadium	5 February 1994	
1995	Optus Grand Prix - Brisbane	QE II Stadium	4 February 1995	
1996	Optus Grand Prix Final - Brisbane	QE II Stadium	14 March 1996	
1997	Optus Grand Prix Final - Brisbane	QE II Stadium	15 March 1997	
1998	Optus Grand Prix Final - Brisbane	QE II Stadium	21 March 1998	
1999	Optus Grand Prix Final - Brisbane	QE II Stadium	13 March 1999	
2000	Grand Prix - Brisbane	QE II Stadium	11 February 2000	
2001	not held			
2002	not held			
2003	Telstra A-series - Brisbane	Queensland Sport and Athletics Centre	23 January 2003	
2004	Telstra A-series - Brisbane	Queensland Sport and Athletics Centre	23 January 2004	
2005	Brisbane Track & Field Classic	Queensland Sport and Athletics Centre	26 November ?	
2006	Telstra A-series - Brisbane	Queensland Sport and Athletics Centre	3 March 2006	
2007	Australian Athletics Cup	Queensland Sport and Athletics Centre	20 January 2007	
2008	Australian Athletics Cup	Queensland Sport and Athletics Centre	2 February 2008	
2009	Australian Athletics Cup	Queensland Sport and Athletics Centre	7 February 2009	
2010	not held			
2011	Brisbane AAT	Queensland Sport and Athletics Centre	11 February 2011	
2012	Brisbane Track Classic	Queensland Sport and Athletics Centre	14 February 2012	
2013	Brisbane Track Classic	Queensland Sport and Athletics Centre	23 February 2013	
2014	Brisbane Track Classic	Queensland Sport and Athletics Centre	29 March 2014	
2015	Brisbane Track Classic	Queensland Sport and Athletics Centre	7 March 2015	
2016	Brisbane Track Classic	Queensland Sport and Athletics Centre	19 March 2016	
2017	not held			
2018	Queensland Track Classic	Queensland Sport and Athletics Centre	28 March 2018	
2019	Queensland Track Classic	Queensland Sport and Athletics Centre	23 March 2019	
2020	not held			
2021	Queensland Track Classic	Queensland Sport and Athletics Centre	27 March 2021	Continental Tour
2022	Brisbane Track Classic	Queensland Sport and Athletics Centre	9 April 2022	Continental Tour Silver
2023	Brisbane Track Classic	Queensland Sport and Athletics Centre	25 March 2023	Continental Tour Silver

== Meet records ==
=== Men ===
Men's meeting records of the Brisbane Track Classic
Event	Record	Athlete	Nationality	Date	Ref.
100 m	10.05 (+1.0 m/s)	Rohan Browning	Australia	27 March 2021	
200 m	20.23 (−1.6 m/s)	Zharnel Hughes	Great Britain	28 March 2018	
400 m	45.28	Clinton Hill	Australia	3 March 2006	
800 m	1:45.16	Djabir Said-Guerni	Algeria	11 February 2000	
1500 m	3:35.85	Martin Keino	Kenya	15 March 1997	
Mile	4:01.12	Simon Doyle	Australia	12 February 1989	
3000 m	7:55.05	Daniel Komen	Kenya	4 February 1995	
5000 m	13:26.06	Luke Kipkosgei	Kenya	11 February 2000	
110 m hurdles	13.22 (±0.0 m/s)	Colin Jackson	Great Britain	14 March 1996	
200 m hurdles	22.59 (+0.2 m/s)	Darryl Wohlsen	Australia	14 March 1996	
400 m hurdles	49.07	Eric Thomas	United States	11 February 2000	
3000 m steeplechase	8:26.91	Matthew Clarke	Australia	25 March 2023	
3000 m walk	10:56.06	Dane Bird-Smith	Australia	28 March 2018	
5000 m walk	18:54.65	Adam Rutter	Australia	7 February 2009	
10 km walk	41:32.82	Simon Baker	Australia	12 February 1989	
High jump	2.31 m	Tim Forsyth	Australia	14 March 1996	
Pole vault	5.85 m	Kurtis Marschell	Australia	25 March 2023	
Long jump	8.12 m (+3.5 m/s)	David Culbert	Australia	18 March 1990	
Triple jump	17.09 m (+0.9 m/s)	Andrew Murphy	Australia	15 March 1997	
Shot put	20.79 m	Justin Anlezark	Australia	23 January 2004	
Discus throw	65.94 m	Benn Harradine	Australia	5 February 1994	
Hammer throw	76.18 m	Karsten Kobs	Germany	13 March 1999	
Javelin throw	82.17 m	Jarred Bannister	Australia	20 January 2007	
4 × 100 m relay	38.31		England	28 March 2018	
4 × 400 m relay	3:03.67		Australia	23 March 2019	

=== Women ===
Women's meeting records of the Brisbane Track Classic
Event	Record	Athlete	Nationality	Date	Ref.
100 m	10.18 (+2.0 m/s)	Hana Basic	Australia	27 March 2021	
200 m	22.35	Melinda Gainsford	Australia	4 February 1995	
400 m	50.21	Catherine Freeman	Australia	14 March 1996	
800 m	1:59.12	Catriona Bisset	Australia	27 March 2021	
1500 m	4:05.18	Sarah Jamieson	Australia	3 March 2006	
Mile	4:43.89	Angela Raines-White	Australia	12 February 1989	
3000 m	9:20.9	Jenny Lund	Australia	2 February 1991	
5000 m	15:25.31	Susie Power	Australia	13 March 1999	
100 m hurdles	12.74 (+0.3 m/s)	Sally Pearson	Australia	7 March 2015	
400 m hurdles	54.49	Jana Pittman	Australia	3 March 2006	
3000 m steeplechase	8:39.44	Cara Feain-Ryan	Australia	25 March 2023	
3000 m walk	12:10.17	Katie Hayward	Australia	23 March 2019	
5000 m walk	21:01.24	Johanna Jackson	Great Britain	7 February 2009	
10 km walk	43:27.57	Kerry Saxby	Australia	12 February 1989	
High jump	1.92 m	Gai Kapernick	Australia	2 February 1991	
Pole vault	4.75 m	Nina Kennedy	Australia	27 March 2021	
Long jump	6.92 m (+1.8 m/s)	Christabel Netty	Canada	28 March 2018	
Triple jump	13.93 m (+1.3 m/s)	Baya Rahouli	Algeria	11 February 2000	
Shot put	17.44 m	Tressa Thompson	United States	13 March 1999	
Discus throw	67.32 m	Daniela Costian	Australia	14 March 2015	
Hammer throw	70.72 m	Jillian Weir	Canada	28 March 2018	
Javelin throw	65.50 m	Joanna Stone	Australia	15 March 1997	
4 × 100 m relay	44.01		Australia	14 February 2012	
4 × 400 m relay	3:34.12		Australia	14 February 2012	
