= Olympic Park Stadium (Melbourne) =

Former sports stadium in Melbourne

- Olympic Park, The Graveyard
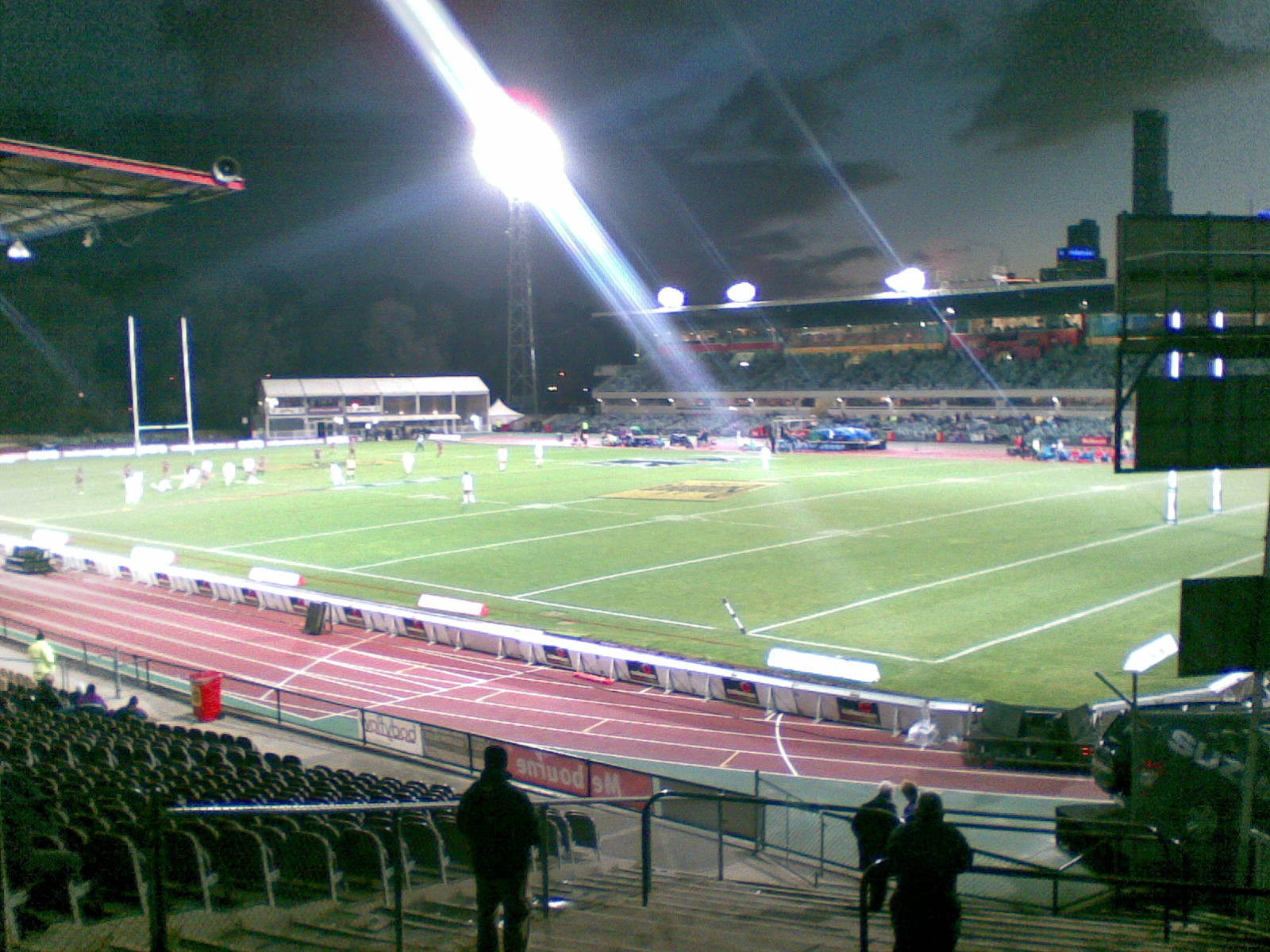
- Interactive map of Olympic Park Stadium
- Location: Olympic Bvd, Melbourne, Victoria
- Coordinates: 37°49′29″S 144°58′52″E
- Owner: Melbourne Olympic Parks Trust
- Operator: Melbourne Olympic Parks Trust
- Capacity: 18,500
- Surface: Grass; Athletics Track

Construction
- Groundbreaking: 1954
- Opened: 1956
- Demolished: 2012

Tenants
- Melbourne Storm (NRL) 1998–2009; St. George Dragons (NSWRL) 1993; 1990 State of Origin series Melbourne Victory (A-League) 2005–2006; Collingwood Football Club (AFL, training) 2004–2012

Olympic Park Stadium was a multi-purpose outdoor stadium located on Olympic Boulevard in inner Melbourne, Australia. The stadium was built as an athletics training venue for the 1956 Olympics, a short distance from the Melbourne Cricket Ground, which served as the Olympic Stadium. Over the years it was the home of rugby league side, Melbourne Storm and the A-League team, Melbourne Victory; throughout its life the stadium played host to athletics. Olympic Park Stadium was located in Olympic Park, which is part of the Melbourne Sports and Entertainment Precinct.

Olympic Park Stadium was demolished in 2012, and replaced with an Australian rules football ground. This new ground, Olympic Park Oval, has been used by the Collingwood Football Club for training purposes, it being adjacent to the Melbourne Sports and Entertainment Centre.

== Former usage ==
The stadium had lighting suited for night athletics meets as well as a world standard athletics track that was refurbished in 1997, with the stadium last being redeveloped in 1998. The athletics track was refurbished again in 2010 for the national championships. Until 2009, the stadium was home of the (NRL) team, the Melbourne Storm. It served as the home of Melbourne Victory (A-League) home games for two seasons (2005–2007). Olympic Park had a capacity of 18,500 spectators, with 11,000 seats.

=== Athletics ===
Australian athletes competed on the track for over fifty years and the venue hosted twelve National Championships. Thirteen world records in athletics had been established at the stadium with Pole vaulter Emma George setting four between 1995 and 1998.

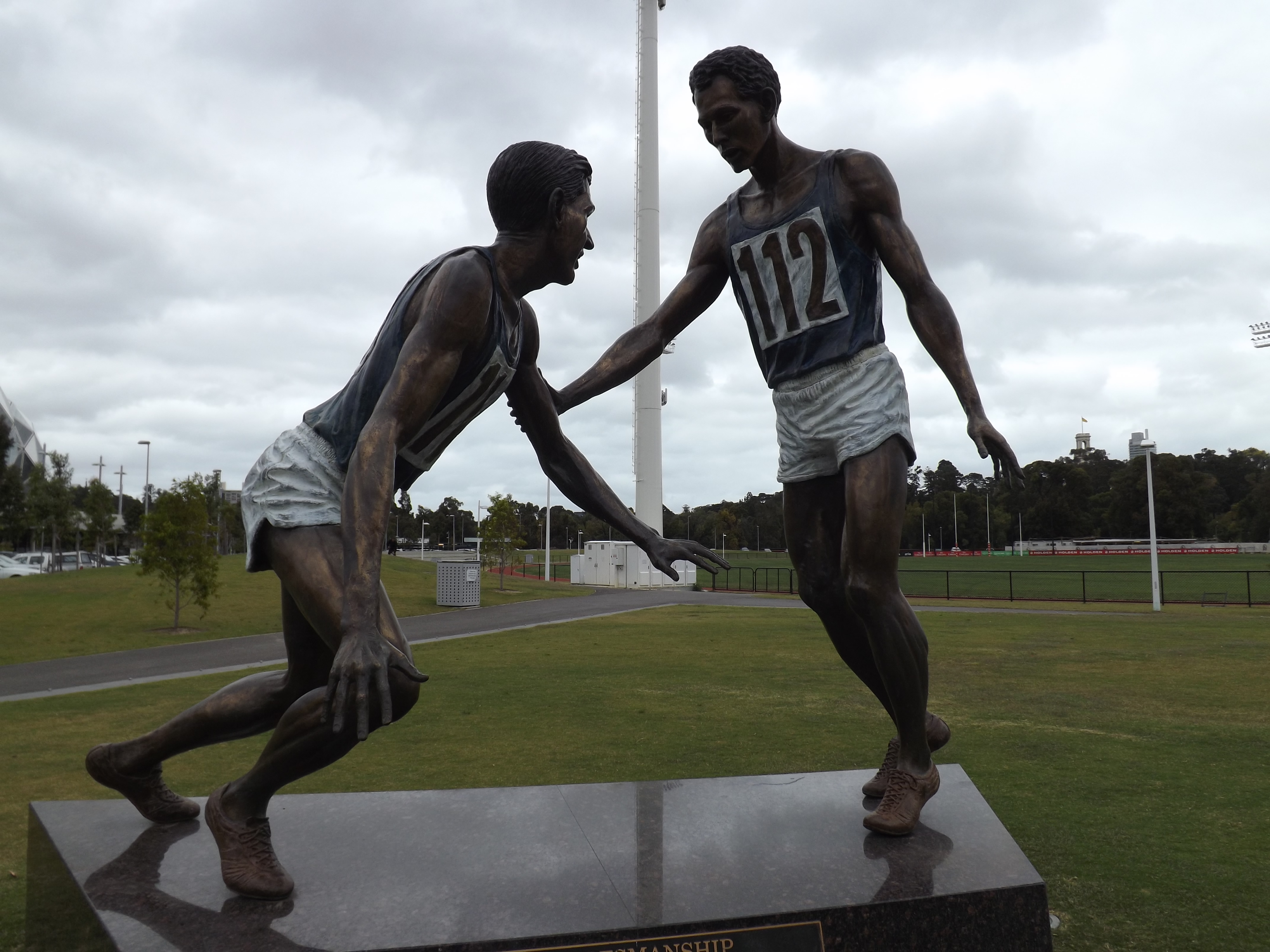
Mitch Mitchell's sculpture depicting Landy's moment of sportmanship

Australian middle-distance runner star John Landy featured in a memorable race at the 1956 National Championships, where he stopped during the Mile championship to assist the fallen junior champion, Ron Clarke. Landy's actions, in front of a 22,000 strong crowd have been described as 'the finest sporting moment in the history of sport'. Landy went on to win the event with many commentators believing that the stop had cost him the world record. A photograph of the fall was named the 'Best Australian Sporting Photo of the Twentieth Century'.

The track was host to the most significant athletics meeting in Australia each year, the Athletics Grand Prix Series, Melbourne, meet (previously the Telstra A-Series meet).

=== Soccer ===
Olympic Park was the first stadium in Australia to be recognised officially by FIFA as a soccer ground. From the mid-1950s onward the venue was considered to be the unofficial home of soccer in Victoria. It regularly hosted important games of the Victorian State League, including Dockerty Cup finals and games by overseas touring teams. The stadium also held FIFA World Cup qualification matches, 1993 FIFA World Youth Championship matches, and group matches of the 1956 Olympics football competition.

Australia played 34 internationals at Olympic Park for 11 wins. The last international match played at Olympic Park was a friendly against Paraguay on 15 June 2000, which Australia won 2–1. The ground also hostrd several National Soccer League grand finals.

=== Rugby league ===
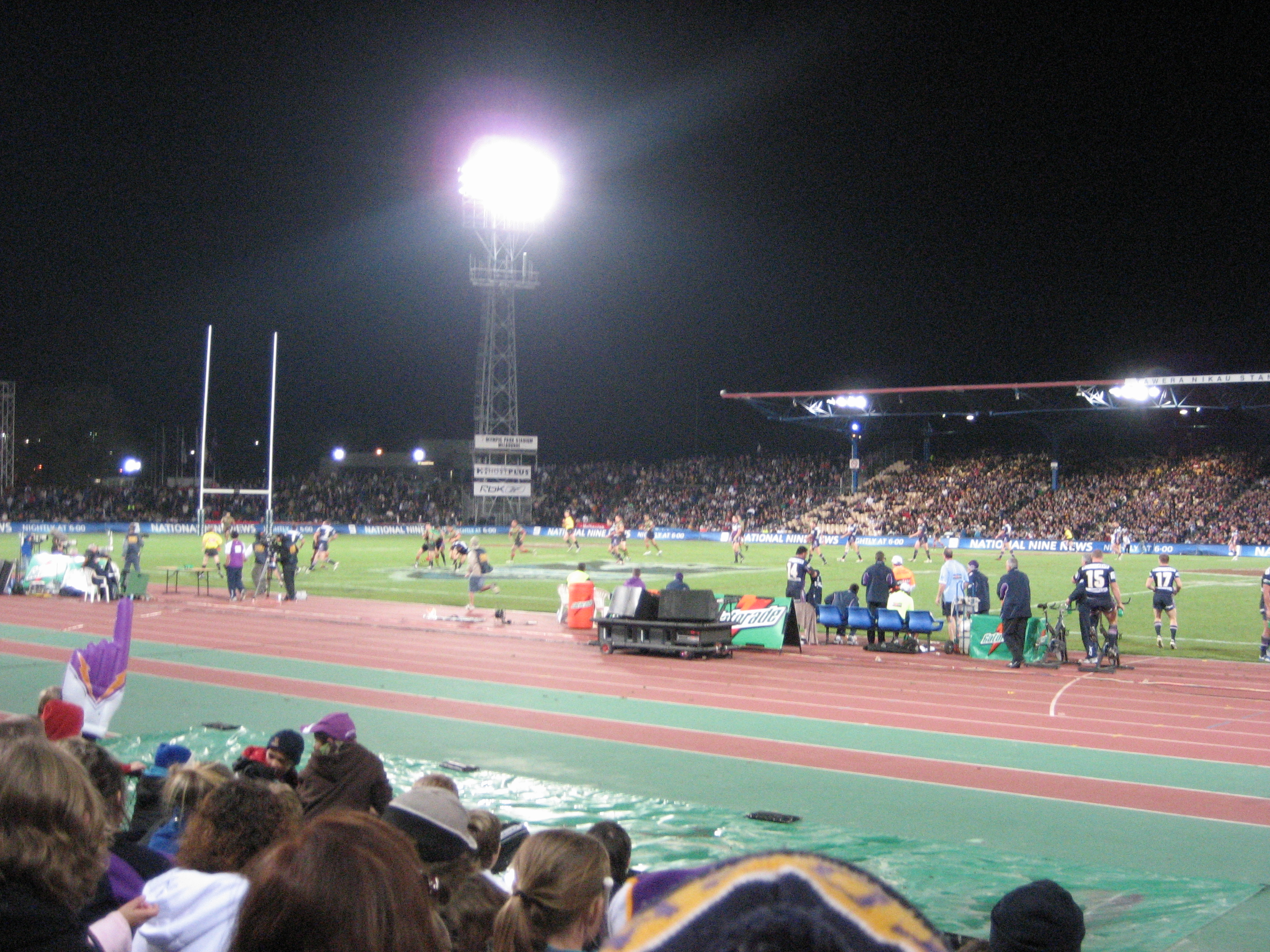
Melbourne Storm playing South Sydney Rabbitohs at Olympic Park

Game II of the 1990 State of Origin series was the first to be played in Melbourne and the stadium was packed to capacity for New South Wales' victory over Queensland. Capacity for the stadium was upped to 25,800 through the use of temporary seating at each end.

The stadium also held an NSWRL premiership match in 1993, when the St. George Dragons defeated the Western Suburbs Magpies 20–8 in front of 11,822 fans. The match was designated as a Wests home game.

The stadium also hosted an Australia vs New Zealand test match on 3 July 1991 as part of the 1991 Trans-Tasman Test series. The match was first rugby league test held in Australia outside of New South Wales or Queensland, with the Kiwi's scoring an upset 24–8 win over the World Champions in front of 26,900 fans.

Olympic Park was the home ground of the Melbourne Storm from 1998 to 2000 and 2002–2009. The exception being 2001 when the Storm moved their home games to the larger, 56,347-capacity Telstra Dome, due in part to the Storm's first three seasons (1998, 1999 and 2000), each having season average attendance of over 13,000. Also attractive in the move was the chance to play indoors due to the stadium having a retractable roof, and also the stadium's ability to move seating closer to the rugby league field. The seating was only moved for one game, however, due to the cost involved and also the damage done to the playing surface, which mostly hosted the Australian Football League (who are also part owners of the stadium). That was the Round 21 clash with defending premiers Brisbane. The 32–28 win over the Broncos also saw the Storm's season high crowd of 15,470. Ultimately, the move to the Docklands was deemed a failure, and, with an average season crowd of only 11,981, the Storm decided to move back to Olympic Park beginning from 2002. Following the move back to Olympic Park, the Storm would play all of their home games and some finals at the venue until moving to the new 30,050-all-seated AAMI Park, built adjacent to Olympic Park, in 2010 (in 2009 major finals against higher drawing teams Brisbane and Manly-Warringah, were moved to the Docklands).

During rugby league matches the Western grandstand was named the Glenn Lazarus Stand after the Storm's foundation and first premiership winning captain, while the Eastern grandstand was named the Tawera Nikau Stand after New Zealand international lock forward who played 53 games for the Storm, including their 20–18 1999 NRL Grand Final win over St George-Illawarra in front of a world record rugby league crowd of 107,999 at the Sydney Olympic Stadium. Local fans unofficially dubbed the Northern end standing room, the Marcus Bai Stand after one of the Storm's most popular players and outstanding wingers.

The Melbourne Storm's nickname for the stadium was "The Graveyard", due to their excellent record at this stadium (136 games, 106 wins, 28 losses, 2 draws), with the Storm winning 77.94% of all matches played at the ground. The Storm's first ever home game at the ground was in Round 4 of the 1998 season when 20,522 saw their new team defeat the North Sydney Bears 24–16. The game remains the highest attended Melbourne Storm game at Olympic Park. The highest attended finals game at the stadium was also the Storm's first ever finals game when 18,247 saw the Sydney Roosters win 26–12 in the 1998 Major Preliminary Semi-final.

Melbourne Storm moved out in 2010, as the stadium was always poorly suited for rugby league because the dimensions of the pitch were too small. They played their last game there in round 25, 29 August 2009, winning 38–4 against the Sydney Roosters.

==== Rugby League Test Matches ====
List of rugby league Test and World Cup matches played at Olympic Park.

Test#	Date	Result	Attendance	Notes
1	23 July 1991	New Zealand def. Australia 24–8	26,900	Played as part of the 1991 Trans-Tasman Test series

=== Rugby Union ===
The stadium has hosted international rugby union matches, including test matches against Fiji in 1961 and Italy in 1994. In 2007, it was home to the now defunct Melbourne Rebels (ARC) in the only season of the Australian Rugby Championship. Victorian rugby union returned to the stadium in 2011 when the Melbourne Rebels played a warm-up, for their debut Super Rugby season, against the Pacific Island Kingdom of Tonga.

=== Other sports ===
The stadium also hosted Gridiron Victoria "Vic Bowl"s between 1985 and 1993.

In January 1995, Olympic Park was used for Motorcycle speedway when it hosted a round of the Australian Speedway Masters Series. The 400 metres (440 yards) speedway track was laid out over the existing athletics track. The Masters Series included the world's best speedway riders, including reigning World Champion Tony Rickardsson from Sweden, 1993 World Champion Sam Ermolenko of the United States, multiple Long Track World Champion Simon Wigg of England and Australia's best riders, including Leigh Adams, Craig Boyce, Jason Crump and Jason Lyons.

=== Events ===
Genesis performed a sold-out concert at the stadium on 13 December 1986 during their Invisible Touch Tour. ZZ Top played a show on February 25, 1987, at Olympic Park, as part of their "Afterburner World Tour". Michael Jackson performed a sold-out concert at the stadium on 13 November 1987 during his Bad World Tour. Bon Jovi played here in November 1995 during their These Days Tour. Alternative Nation music festival was held here in 1995 festival wiki

=== Collingwood Football Club's outdoor training ground ===
When the Collingwood Football Club moved its administrative and training facilities from Victoria Park to the Melbourne Sports and Entertainment Centre in 2004. The Collingwood Football Club used the Olympic Park Stadium as its outdoor training ground until the demolition in 2012. After this occurred, Collingwood Football Club moved its outdoor training ground to the newly developed Olympic Park Oval that replaced the stadium after demolition.

== Decline and demolition ==
Being an Australian rules football state, Victoria lacked a rectangular stadium of a size suitable for the growing numbers of attendees at the sports using Olympic Park. There were plans for Olympic Park to be turned into a 40,000-seat rectangular stadium in the 1990s, with the main reason being the loss of international soccer, rugby league state of origin games, and rugby union games to the much larger Melbourne Cricket Ground (and later Docklands Stadium). However, these venues had less ideal viewing conditions for rectangular sports. The redevelopment of Olympic Park never occurred, with the Bracks Government revealing in 2005 that a new 20,000-seat rectangular stadium would be built and would be home to Melbourne Victory and Melbourne Storm.

Melbourne Victory moved out of Olympic Park during the 2006–07 A-League season, due to capacity issues and moved into Docklands Stadium. It was a huge success, with crowd numbers of over 20,000 and giving the stadium a major summer tenant which the stadium previously lacked. Due to the crowd average exceeding the proposed capacity of the rectangular stadium, they declared they would not play at the rectangular stadium unless the capacity was increased. In May 2007, the proposed capacity was increased to 30,000.

Demolition of the venue began in late 2012 and has now been completed with a new MCG-sized Australian Football training oval called Olympic Park Oval in its place.
