= Sydney Track Classic =

Annual outdoor track and field meeting

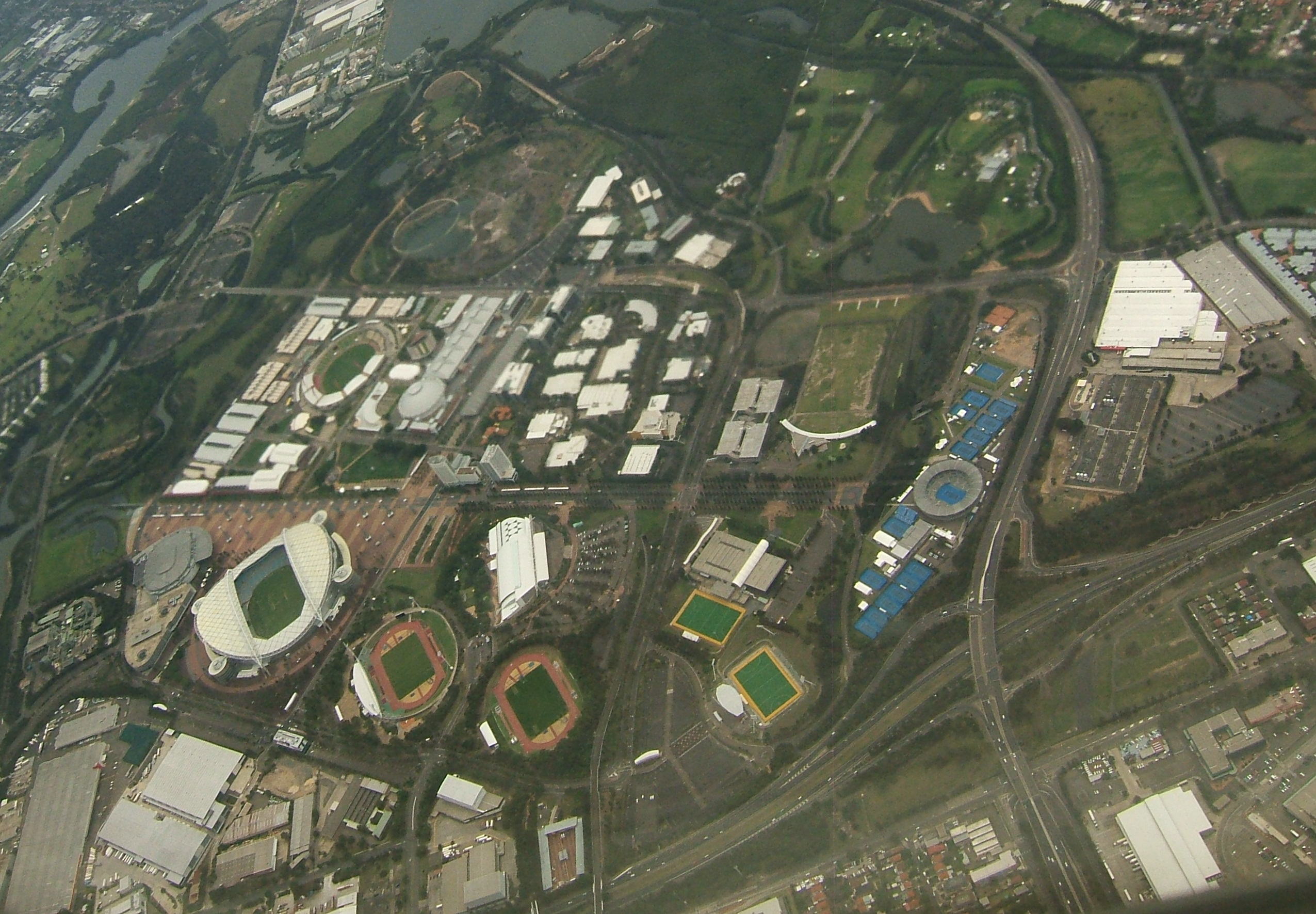
- The Sydney Olympic Park complex which contains the meet venue
- Date: February/March
- Location: Sydney, Australia
- Event type: Track and field
- Website: Sydney Track Classic at the Wayback Machine (archived 2014-12-26)

The Sydney Track Classic is an annual outdoor track and field meeting held in February or March at the Sydney Olympic Park Athletic Centre in the suburb of Sydney Olympic Park in Sydney, Australia. It is part of the national Australian Athletics Tour, alongside the Melbourne Track Classic.

The history of the event emerged from a series of major athletics meetings which were held in the 1990s. The 1999 competition was the opening leg of the IAAF Grand Prix circuit and it formed part of the preparation towards the 2000 Sydney Olympics. The meeting was abandoned in 2002, but events hosted by the Sydney University Athletics Club and Athletics New South Wales saw the Sydney Track Classic restored in 2006.

By 2009 the competition was attracting top level domestic athletes (such as Steve Hooker and Sally McLellan) as well as a number of high-profile foreign athletes (including Asafa Powell, Melaine Walker, and Valerie Vili). The meeting was ranked first domestically for the level of performances that year. Hooker, Dani Samuels and Tero Pitkämäki provided the highlights of the 2010 edition, while Mitchell Watt and David Rudisha topped the bill in 2011.

In 2020 the meeting kicked off the inaugural World Athletics Continental Tour.

== Editions ==
Sydney Track Classic editions
Year	Title	Venue	Date	Status
1980	Alcoa Challenge Series - Sydney	ES Marks Field	30 December 1979	
1981	Alcoa Challenge Series - Sydney	ES Marks Field	8 March 1981	
1982				
1983				
1984				
1985				
1986				
1987				
1988				
1989	AIS Drug Offensive		8 February 1989	
1990	Commonwealth Challenge		14 January 1990	
1991	Mobil Grand Prix		20 January 1991	
1992	Sugar Games		25 January 1992	
1993	Sugar Games		23 January 1993	
1994	Mars Challenge		30 January 1994	
1995	Optus Grand Prix Final - Sydney		21 March 1995	
1996	Optus Grand Prix - Sydney		11 February 1996	
1997	Optus Grand Prix - Sydney	Sydney Olympic Park Athletics Centre	27 January 1997	
1998	Sydney Track Tour	Sydney Olympic Park Athletics Centre	28 February 1998	
1999	Optus Grand Prix - Sydney	Sydney Olympic Park Athletics Centre	20 February 1999	
2000	Optus Grand Prix - Sydney	Sydney Olympic Park Athletics Centre	13 February 2000	
2001	Telstra Athletics Grand Prix - Sydney	Sydney Olympic Park Athletics Centre	16 February 2001	
2002				
2003	Telstra A-series - Sydney	Sydney Olympic Park Athletics Centre	22 March 2003	
2004				
2005				
2006				
2007	Telstra A series - Sydney	Sydney Olympic Park Athletics Centre	17 February 2007	
2008	Sydney Athletics Grand Prix	Sydney Olympic Park Athletics Centre	12 January 2008 (Sydney Track Classic?); 16 February 2008	
2009	Sydney GP Series Meet	Sydney Olympic Park Athletics Centre	28 February 2009	
2010	Sydney Track Classic	Sydney Olympic Park Athletics Centre	27 February 2010	
2011	Sydney Track Classic	Sydney Olympic Park Athletics Centre	19 March 2011	
2012	Sydney Track Classic	Sydney Olympic Park Athletics Centre	18 February 2012	
2013	Sydney Track Classic	Sydney Olympic Park Athletics Centre	9 March 2013	
2014	Sydney Track Classic	Sydney Olympic Park Athletics Centre	15 March 2014	
2015	Sydney Track Classic	Sydney Olympic Park Athletics Centre	15 March 2015	
2016	Sydney Track Classic	Sydney Olympic Park Athletics Centre	19 March 2016	
2017				
2018				
2019	Sydney Track Classic	Sydney Olympic Park Athletics Centre	23 February 2019	
2020	Sydney Track Classic	Sydney Olympic Park Athletics Centre	22 February 2020	Continental Tour Bronze
2021	Sydney Track Classic	Sydney Olympic Park Athletics Centre	13 March 2021	Continental Tour Bronze
2022	Sydney Track Classic	Sydney Olympic Park Athletics Centre	12 March 2022	Continental Tour Bronze
2023	Sydney Track Classic	Sydney Olympic Park Athletics Centre	11 March 2023	Continental Tour Challenger
2024	Sydney Track Classic	ES Marks Field	23 March 2024	Continental Tour Challenger
2025	Sydney Track Classic	Sydney Olympic Park Athletics Centre	15 March 2025	Continental Tour Challenger

== Meeting records ==
=== Men ===
Men's meeting records of the Sydney Track Classic
Event	Record	Athlete	Nationality	Date	Ref.
100 m	9.94	Frankie Fredericks	Namibia	1999	
200 m	20.42 (+0.2 m/s)	LaShawn Merritt	United States	15 March 2014	
400 m	44.65	Fred Kerley	United States	11 March 2023	
800 m	1:43.15	David Rudisha	Kenya	2010	
1500 m	3:32.55	William Chirchir	Kenya	2000	
3000 m	7:46.38	Cameron Myers	Australia	23 March 2024	
5000 m	13:29.99	Matthew Ramsden	Australia	13 March 2021	
110 m hurdles	13.25 (+0.3 m/s)	Rachid Muratake	Japan	11 March 2023	
400 m hurdles	48.49	Bryan Bronson	United States	1998	
3000 m steeplechase	8:19.14	Julius Kipchoge	Kenya	2012	
High jump	2.31 m	Charles Austin	United States	1998	
Pole vault	5.95 m	Steven Hooker	Australia	2009	
Long jump	7.88 (+0.4 m/s)	Jalen Rucker	Australia	11 March 2023	
Triple jump	17.28 m	Justin Anlezark	Australia	1996	
Shot put	17.77 m	Aiden Harvey	Australia	11 March 2023	
Hammer throw	68.44 m	Ned Weatherley	Australia	11 March 2023	
Javelin throw	85.28 m	Andrew Currey	Australia	2000	
4 × 100 m relay	37.87	Lachlan Kennedy; Joshua Azzopardi; Chris Ius; Calab Law	Australia	15 March 2025	

=== Women ===
Men's meeting records of the Sydney Track Classic
Event	Record	Athlete	Nationality	Date	Ref.
100 m	10.97 (+0.5 m/s)	Zoe Hobbs	New Zealand	11 March 2023	
200 m	21.98	Marion Jones	United States	1998	
400 m	50.43	Jana Pittman	Australia	2003	
800 m	1:58.62	Abbey Caldwell	Australia	11 March 2023	
1500 m	4:10.37	Heidi See	Australia	19 March 2016	
3000 m	8:31.81	Jessica Hull	Australia	11 March 2023	
5000 m	15:04.07	Mercy Cherono	Kenya	15 March 2014	
100 m hurdles	12.70 (+0.6 m/s)	Michelle Jenneke	Australia	11 March 2023	
400 m hurdles	54.64	Jana Pittman	Australia	2003	
High jump	1.94 m	Nicola Olyslagers	Australia	11 March 2023	
Pole vault	4.82 m	Nina Kennedy	Australia	13 March 2021	
Long jump	6.76 m	Nicole Boegman	Australia	1996	
Triple jump	13.77 m	Nicole Mladenis	Australia	2004	
Shot put	20.67 m	Valerie Adams	New Zealand	2012	
Discus throw	66.21 m	Dani Samuels	Australia	14 March 2015	
Hammer throw	69.71 m	Bronwyn Eagles	Australia	2003	
Javelin throw	64.84 m	Kathryn Mitchell	Australia	17 March 2018	
4 × 100 m relay	42.84	Ella Connolly; Bree Rizzo; Kristie Edwards; Chloe Mannix-Power	Australia	15 March 2025	
