= Australian Athletics Tour =

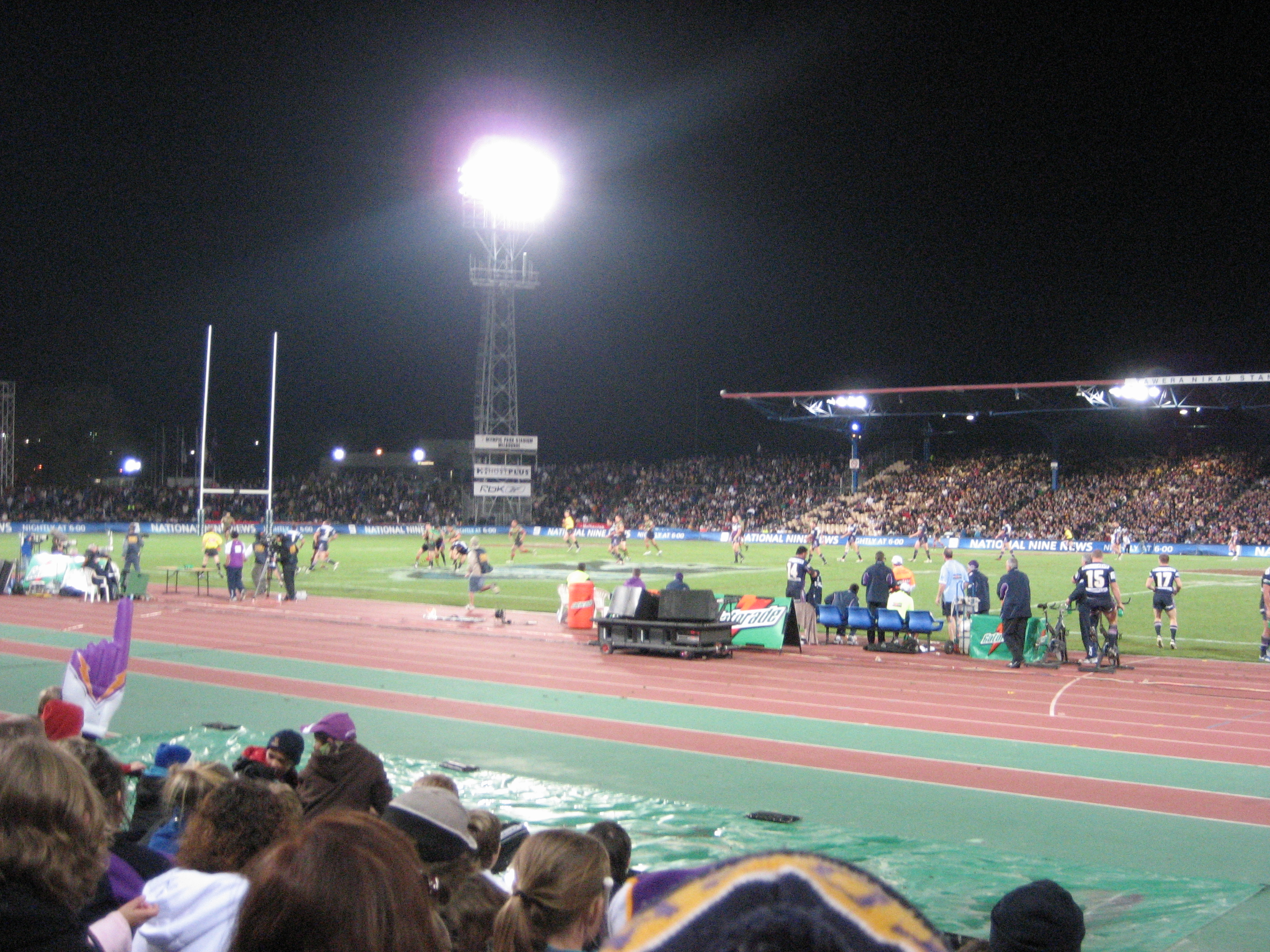
The Melbourne Grand Prix, held annually at Olympic Park before it was demolished, is the premier Australian athletics meeting. Photo from 2007.

The Australian Athletics Tour, formerly the Athletics Grand Prix Series, is a series of annual Australian track and field competitions which is held from February to April. Australian athletes aiming to be selected for the Olympic Games, World Championships, or Commonwealth Games are usually required to compete in the meetings that form the series.

== Overview ==
Each year, Athletics Australia and its member associations conduct a range of athletics meets held around the country in a two-tiered structure. Australian Athletics Tour is part of the Athletics Australia National Athletics Series from November to April, which includes meetings like the Hunter Track Classic in Newcastle, Briggs Athletics Classic in Hobart, Canberra Track Classic, Adelaide Track Classic, Melbourne Track Classic, Perth Track Classic, Sydney Track Classic and Brisbane Track Classic in Brisbane.

From 2005 to 2009, the Melbourne Track Classic was part of the prestigious IAAF World Athletics Tour, at which competing athletes can earn points towards competing in the IAAF World Athletics Final. From 2010 to 2016, the meeting was part of the IAAF World Challenge.

In 2017, Athletics Australia cancelled the entire tour in favour of a Nitro Athletics event in Melbourne from 4–11 February. NSW Athletics continued both events regardless of their inclusion in the tour. Canberra looks to also get a national event with a "summer of athletics grand prix".

== Editions ==
Australian Athletics Tour editions
Season	Adelaide	Brisbane	Canberra	Hobart	Melbourne	Newcastle	Perth	Sydney
1985-86			21 Jan 1986				25 Jan 1986	
1986-87			20 Jan 1987				24 Jan 1987	
1987-88	9 Feb 1988	13 Mar 1988	26 Jan 1988	5 Jan 1988	17 Mar 1988		21 Jan 1988	
1988-89	1 Feb 1989	12 Feb 1989	26 Jan 1989	4 Jan 1989	9 Mar 1989		5 Mar 1989	8 Feb 1989
1989-90	14 Mar 1990	18 Mar 1990	10 Jan 1990	4 Jan 1990	8 Feb 1990		19 Nov 1989	14 Jan 1990
1990-91	15 Feb 1991	2 Feb 1991	26 Jan 1991	6-7 Jan 1991	7 Feb 1991		10 Feb 1991	20 Jan 1991
1991-92	16 Feb 1992	1 Feb 1992	27 Jan 1992	12 Jan 1992	25 Feb 1992		22 Feb 1992	25 Jan 1992
1992-93	14 Feb 1993	31 Jan 1993	25 Jan 1993	17 Jan 1993	25 Feb 1993		7 Feb 1993	23 Jan 1993
1993-94	11 Feb 1994	5 Feb 1994	28 Jan 1994	26 Feb 1994	24 Feb 1994		13 Feb 1994	30 Jan 1994
1994-95	26 Jan 1995	4 Feb 1995	18 Mar 1995	19 Feb 1995	23 Feb 1995		29 Jan 1995	21 Mar 1995
1995-96	26 Jan 1996	14 Mar 1996	3 Dec 1995	25 Feb 1996	29 Feb 1996		28 Jan 1996	11 Feb 1996
1996-97	1 Feb 1997	15 Mar 1997	11 Jan 1997	16 Feb 1997	20 Feb 1997		19 Jan 1997	27 Jan 1997
1997-98	26 Jan 1998	21 Mar 1998	8 Feb 1998	22 Feb 1998	25 Feb 1998		24 Jan 1998	28 Feb 1998
1998-99	26 Jan 1999	13 Mar 1999	6 Feb 1999	28 Feb 1999	25 Feb 1999		24 Jan 1999	20 Feb 1999
1999-00	8 Mar 2000	11 Feb 2000	15 Jan 2000	30 Jan 2000	2 Mar 2000		5 Feb 2000	13 Feb 2000
2000-01	not held	not held	18 Feb 2001	11 Mar 2001	1 Mar 2001		4 Mar 2001	16 Feb 2001
2001-02	23 Mar 2002	not held	8 Feb 2002	9 Mar 2002	7 Mar 2002		16 Mar 2002	not held
2002-03	6 Feb 2003	23 Jan 2003	22/23 Feb 2003	not held	1 Mar 2003		8 Feb 2003	22 Mar 2003
2003-04	not held	23 Jan 2004	30/31 Jan 2004	not held	12 Feb 2004		10 Jan 2004	not held
2004-05	15 Feb 2005	26 Nov 2004	5 Feb 2005	not held	17 Feb 2005		22 Jan 2005	not held
2005-06	not held	3 Mar 2006	26 Jan 2006	6 Jan 2006	9 Mar 2006		18 Dec 2005	not held
2006-07	not held	20 Jan 2007	27 Jan 2007	9 Feb 2007	2 Mar 2007		7 Jan 2007	17 Feb 2007
2007-08	not held	2 Feb 2008	26 Jan 2008	18 Jan 2008	21 Feb 2008		15 Dec 2007	16 Feb 2008
2008-09	not held	7 Feb 2009	18 Jan 2009	30 Jan 2009	5 Mar 2009		19 Mar 2009	28 Feb 2009
2009-10	not held	not held	not held	12 Feb 2010	4 Mar 2010		not held	27 Feb 2010
2010-11	not held	11 Feb 2011	not held	20 Feb 2012	3 Mar 2011		1 Apr 2011	19 Mar 2011
2011-12	28 Feb 2012	14 Feb 2012	not held	4 Feb 2013	2-3 Mar 2012	21 Jan 2012	11 Feb 2012	18 Feb 2012
2012-13	16 Feb 2013	23 Feb 2013	not held	23 Feb 2013	6 Apr 2013	2 Feb 2013	16 Mar 2013	9 Mar 2013
2013-14	15 Feb 2014	29 Mar 2014	not held	1 Feb 2014	22 Mar 2014	18 Jan 2014	23 Feb 2014	15 Mar 2014
2014-15	21 Feb 2015	7 Mar 2015	7 Feb 2015	25/26 Jan 2015	21 Mar 2015	31 Jan 2015	14 Feb 2015	15 Mar 2015
2015-16	20 Feb 2016	19 Mar 2016	20 Feb 2016	13 Feb 2016	5 Mar 2016	2 Feb 2016	12 Mar 2016	19 Mar 2016
2016-17	not held	not held	11-12 Mar 2017	not held	not held	28 Jan 2017	not held	not held
2017-18	not held	28 Mar 2018	not held	not held	not held	20 Jan 2018	13 Jan 2018	17 Mar 2018
2018-19	not held	23 Mar 2019	28 Jan 2019	not held	not held	25 Jan 2019	16 Mar 2019	23 Feb 2019
2019-20	not held	not held	13 Feb 2020	not held	6 Feb 2020	not held	1 Feb 2020	22 Feb 2020
2020-21	not held	27 Mar 2021	11 Mar 2021	not held	25 Mar 2021	not held	not held	13 Mar 2021
2021-22	12 Feb 2022	9 Apr 2022	not held	not held	19 Mar 2022	not held	not held	12 Mar 2022
2022-23	11 Feb 2023	25 Mar 2023	not held	not held	23 Feb 2023	not held	not held	11 Mar 2023
2023-24	10 Feb 2024	not held	2 Mar 2024	not held	15 Feb 2024	not held	not held	23 Mar 2024
2024-25	15 Feb 2025	2024-25	not held	not held	29 Mar 2025	not held	1 Mar 2025	15 Mar 2025
2025-26	14 Mar 2026	not held	not held	28 Feb 2026	28 Mar 2026	not held	14 Feb 2026	not held

== IAAF World Athletics Tour meets ==
The three IAAF approved meetings held in Australia are:

- Canberra AIS meet - traditionally conducted around Australia Day, 26 January
- Sydney Track Classic - usually conducted in late February
- Melbourne Track Classic - traditionally conducted in late February

The Australian Championships are held shortly after the conclusion of the Grand Prix series.

The Grand Prix series is usually telecast on SBS Television.

== Event sponsorship ==
The series has previously been supported by Athletics Australia's major sponsor and known as:

- Mobil Grand Prix series
- Optus Grand Prix series
- Telstra A-Series
- Qantas Australian Athletics Tour

Telstra's support for athletics in Australia ended in 2007 and the sport was without a major sponsor during the 2008 series.
