= Perth Track Classic =

Annual outdoor track and field meeting

- Date: February/March
- Location: Perth, Western Australia
- Event type: Track and field

The Perth Track Classic is an annual outdoor track and field meeting held in February or March at the Western Australian Athletics Stadium in Perth, Western Australia. It is part of the national Australian Athletics Tour.

== Meeting records ==
=== Men ===
Men's meeting records of the Perth Track Classic
Event	Record	Athlete	Nationality	Date	Ref.
100 m	10.11 heat (+1.6 m/s)	Linford Christie	Great Britain	29 January 1995	
100 m	10.11 (+1.9 m/s)	Matt Shirvington	Australia	4 March 2001	
200 m	20.58 (+1.1 m/s)	Simon Magakwe	South Africa	22 February 2014	
400 m	45.29	Darren Clark	Australia	24 January 1987	
800 m	1:44.89	David Rudisha	Kenya	12 March 2016	
1500 m					
Mile	3:53.73	James Magut	Kenya	22 February 2014	
3000 m					
5000 m					
110 m hurdles					
400 m hurdles	49.02	Jiri Muzik	Czech Republic	5 February 2000	
3000 m steeplechase					
High jump	2.36 m	Konstantin Matusevich	Israel	5 February 2000	
Pole vault	5.91 m	Paul Burgess Steve Hooker	Australia	4 January 2007	
Long jump					
Triple jump					
Shot put	20.07 m	Justin Anlezark	Australia	8 February 2003	
Javelin throw	85.40 m	Andrew Currey	Australia	24 January 1998	
4 × 100 m relay					

=== Women ===
Women's meeting records of the Perth Track Classic
Event	Record	Athlete	Nationality	Date	Ref.
100 m	11.20 (+0.5 m/s)	Sally Pearson	Australia	31 March 2011	
200 m	22.82 (−1.7 m/s)	Melinda Gainsford-Taylor	Australia	29 January 1995	
400 m	51.01	Catherine Freeman	Australia	24 January 1998	
800 m					
1500 m	4:07.21	Susan Kuijken	Netherlands	22 February 2014	
3000 m					
5000 m					
100 m hurdles	12.59 (−0.2 m/s)	Sally Pearson	Australia	22 February 2014	
400 m hurdles	55.61	Lauren Boden	Australia	11 February 2012	
High jump					
Pole vault	4.66 m	Alana Boyd	Australia	11 February 2012	
Long jump	7.05 m (+2.0 m/s)	Brooke Stratton	Australia	12 March 2016	
Triple jump					
Shot put					
Discus throw					
Hammer throw					
Javelin throw	63.95 m	Kathryn Mitchell	Australia	12 March 2016	
4 × 100 m relay					
