= Gelenau =

- Municipality
- Coat of arms

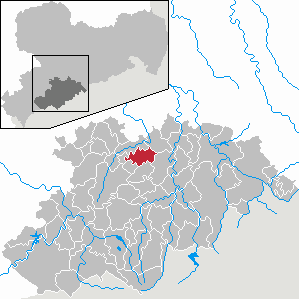
- Location of Gelenau within Erzgebirgskreis district
- Interactive map of Gelenau
- Location within Germany Location within Saxony
- Coordinates: 50°42′41″N 12°57′55″E
- Country: Germany
- State: Saxony
- District: Erzgebirgskreis

Government
  - Mayor (2022–29): Knut Schreiter (CDU)

Area
  - Total: 21.11 km^{2} (8.15 sq mi)
- Elevation: 513 m (1,683 ft)

Population (2025-12-31)
  - Total: 3,954
  - Density: 187.3/km^{2} (485.1/sq mi)
- Time zone: UTC+01:00 (CET)
  - Summer (DST): UTC+02:00 (CEST)
- Postal codes: 09423
- Dialling codes: 037297
- Vehicle registration: ERZ, ANA, ASZ, AU, MAB, MEK, STL, SZB, ZP
- Website: www.gelenau.de

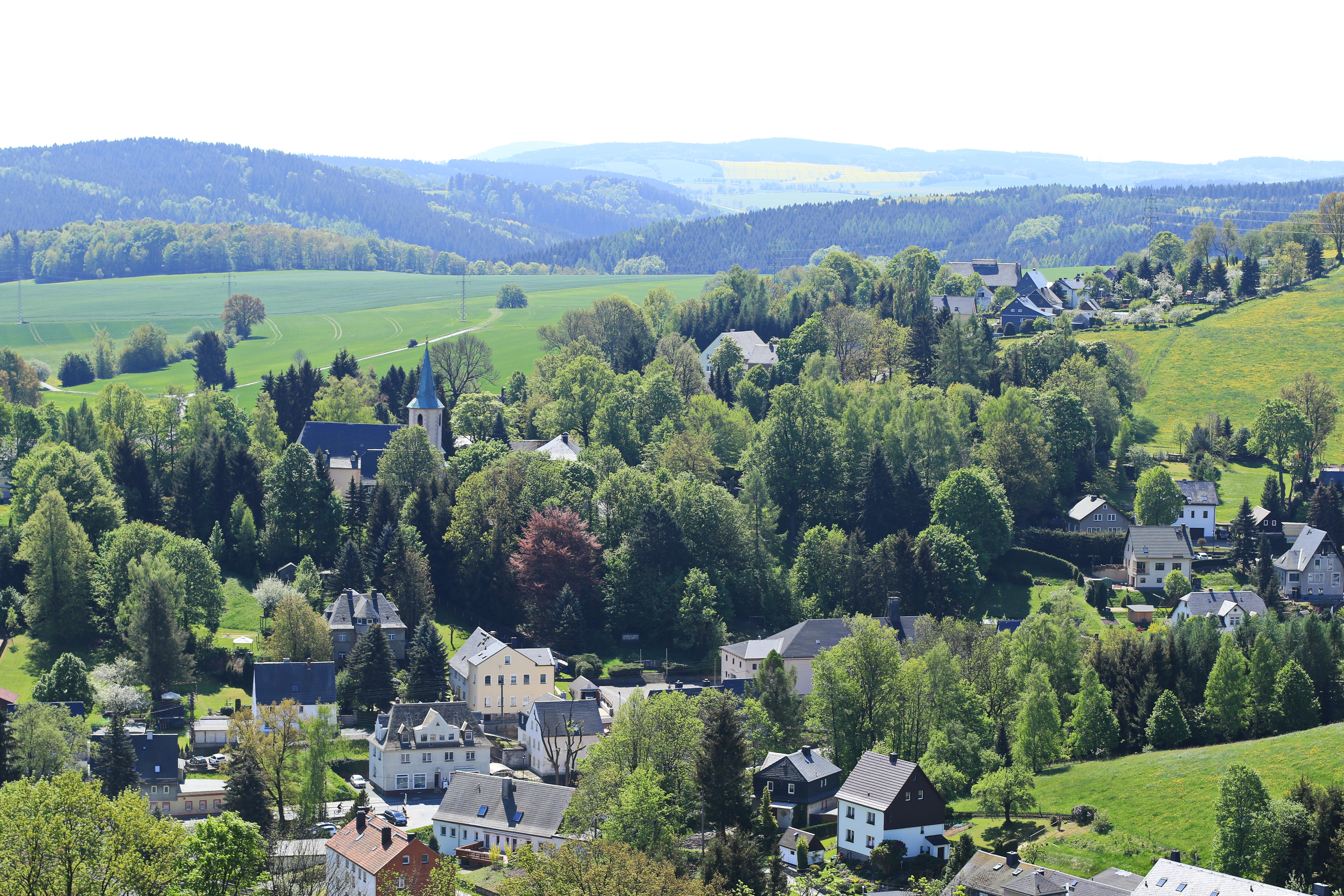
Gelenau in Saxony

Gelenau is a municipality in the district of Erzgebirgskreis, in Saxony, Germany.

== Sources ==
- Schumann, August (1816). "Gelenau". Vollständiges Staats-, Post- und Zeitungslexikon von Sachsen (in German). Vol. 3. Zwickau. p. 71.
