= SA Athletics Stadium =

Athletics facility in Adelaide

- Interactive map of SA Athletics Stadium
- Former names: Santos Stadium
- Location: Marjorie Jackson Nelson Drive, Mile End SA 5031
- Coordinates: 34°55′46″S 138°34′42″E
- Owner: Government of SA
- Operator: Office for Recreation, Sport and Racing
- Capacity: 1,200 (total capacity 6,000)
- Surface: Synthetic Athletics track with a FIFA sized turf pitch

Construction
- Opened: 26 January 1998

Tenants
- SA Athletics, SA Little Athletics Assoc., SA Athletics League and City Bay Fun Run

SA Athletics Stadium is an athletics stadium located in Adelaide. Located in the Adelaide Parklands, the stadium includes a running track and field complex. The stadium was formerly known as Santos Stadium under a sponsorship arrangement with Santos Limited.

SA Athletics Stadium is owned and operated by the Office for Recreation, Sport and Racing, an agency of the Government of South Australia.

Opened on Australia Day, 1998, it replaced the Olympic Sports Field in Kensington as Adelaide's premier athletics venue, and has seating for 1,200 and a maximum capacity of 6,000. The track surface is Rekortan M99.

The stadium is located on the edge of the CBD, in the Adelaide Parklands adjacent to Netball SA Stadium, Adelaide's largest dedicated netball complex. The Stadium is home to Athletics South Australia, the South Australia Athletics League, City Bay Fun Run, the South Australian Little Athletics Association, and is regularly used by schools for sporting carnivals.
