= Sydney Olympic Park Athletic Centre =

Stadium in Sydney, New South Wales

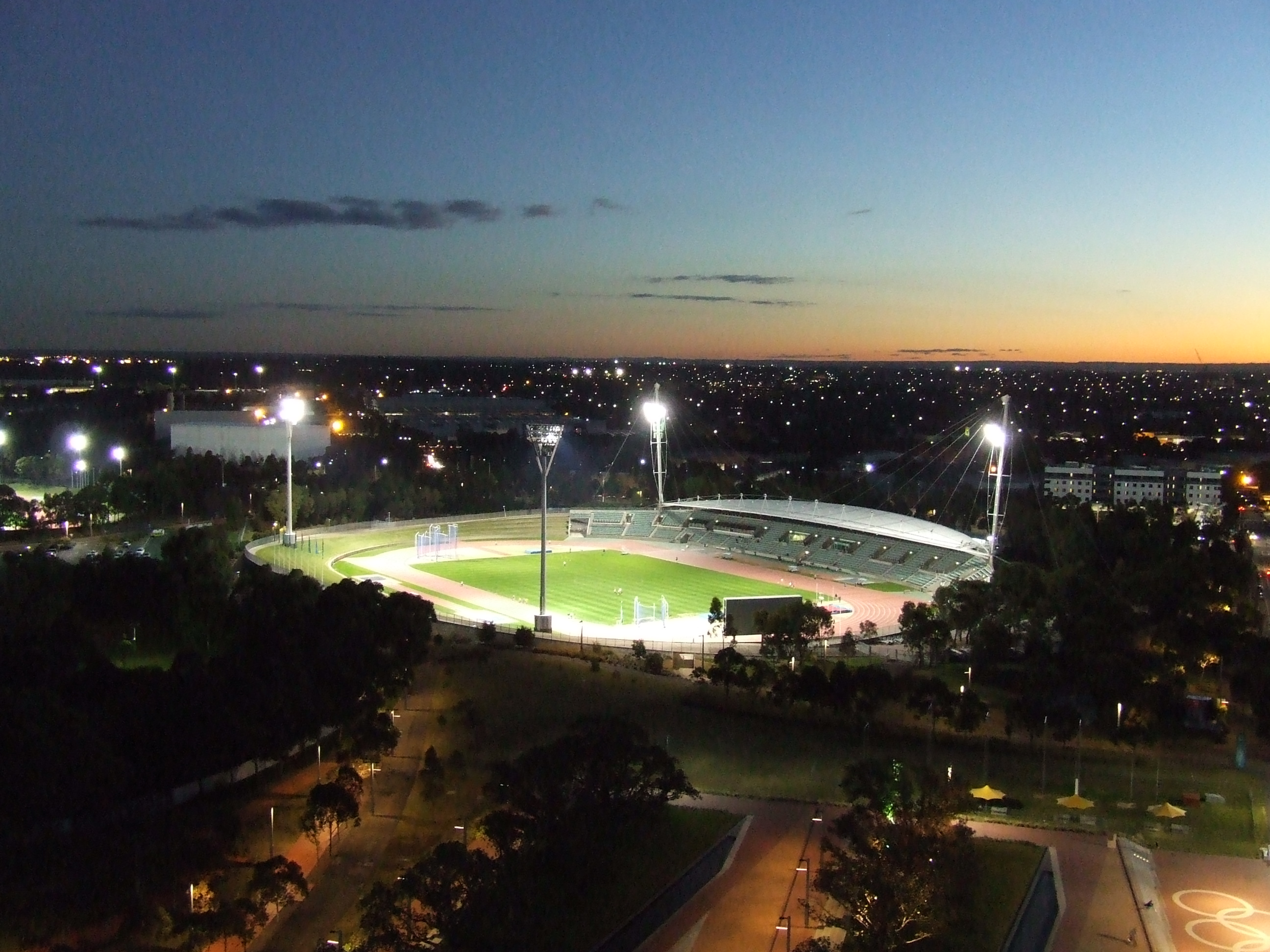
- Sydney Olympic Park Athletic Centre
- Interactive map of Sydney Olympic Park Athletic Centre
- Former names: Sydney International Athletic Centre, Sydney Athletic Centre
- Location: Sydney Olympic Park, New South Wales 2127
- Coordinates: 33°51′1″S 151°3′51″E
- Owner: Sydney Olympic Park
- Operator: Sydney Olympic Park Authority
- Capacity: 5,000
- Surface: Grass, synthetic athletics track

Construction
- Opened: 12 March 1994

Tenants
- Sydney Olympic (Australian Championship) (2026–present); Sydney FC (A-League Women) (2026–present); West Sydney Berries (2008) (NSW Premier League)

Sydney Olympic Park Athletic Centre is a multi-use stadium in the Sydney Olympic Park suburb of Sydney, New South Wales, Australia. The capacity of the stadium is 5,000 spectators. It also hosted the 1996 World Junior Championships in Athletics and served as the warm-up track for the 2000 Olympic Games, being connected by a tunnel to Stadium Australia, where the Olympic competition was held. Since 1994 it has been a frequent venue of the Australian Athletics Championships.
