= Botswana Golden Grand Prix =

Athletics meeting in Gaborone, Botswana

- Dates: Late April
- Host city: Gaborone, Botswana
- Venue: Botswana National Stadium
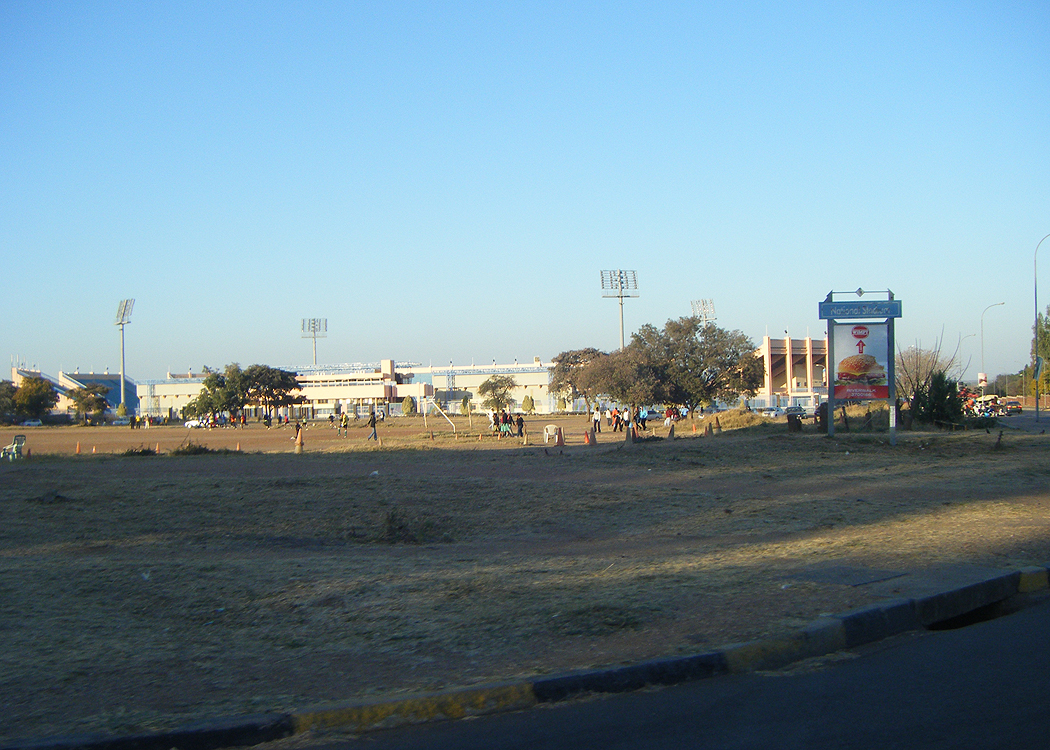
- Level: World Athletics Continental Tour Gold
- 2026 Botswana Golden Grand Prix

The Botswana Golden Grand Prix, formerly called the Gaborone International Meet, is a track and field meeting held at the Botswana National Stadium in Gaborone. In 2023, it was a World Athletics Continental Tour Gold level meeting – the second-highest level of athletics meetings behind the Diamond League. It has been downgraded to a Silver level meeting as of the 2025 meet, while retaining its name.

The meeting was founded by the Sport View Runners Club as the Sports View International after Gaborone hosted the 2011 African Junior Athletics Championships, though the first international meeting was not held until 2012. It was rebranded to Gaborone International Meet in 2017 before adopting its current name in 2020.

It was the third-ever meeting in Africa to be promoted to Continental Tour Gold status, after the Rabat Diamond League in Morocco and the Kip Keino Classic in Kenya. Per an agreement signed in 2023, it will be a Gold status meeting through 2025. Former 800 metres runner Glody Dube has been described as "the brains behind" the operation.

The 2024 edition, originally scheduled for 14 April, was cancelled on 29 March due to administrative disagreements about whether Dube or the Botswanan government would organize the event. Mmegi reported that a source told them, "World Athletics reportedly wants to rope in an American company in conjunction with the government to take over the organisation of the event, which is scheduled for April 14". Dube sued World Athletics, and by late March, the lawsuit was still ongoing and the Botswana Athletics Association had to cancel.

== Editions ==
Botswana Golden Grand Prix editions
Ed.	Name	Date	Ref.
1st	2012 Sports View International	18–19 April 2012	
2nd	2014 Sports View International	19 April 2014	
3rd	2015 Sports View International	23 May 2015	
4th	2017 Gaborone International Meet	29 April 2017	
5th	2018 Gaborone International Meet	29 April 2018	
6th	2019 Gaborone International Meet	27 April 2019	
7th	2022 Gaborone International Meet	30 April 2022	
8th	2023 Botswana Golden Grand Prix	29 April 2023	
9th	2025 Botswana Golden Grand Prix	12 April 2025	
10th	2026 Botswana Golden Grand Prix	26 April 2026	
