= Papaflessia =

Annual track and field event in Kalamata, Greece

Papaflessia (Greek: Παπαφλέσσεια) is an annual international track and field meeting that is held in Kalamata, Greece. The meeting falls within the European Athletic Association's calendar of meeting. The event caters to both men and women and athletic events held at the meeting include sprints, high jump, long jump, triple jump and javelin.

Papaflessia was named in honour of Papaflessas, a Greek priest and celebrated military leader who died at the Battle of Maniaki during the Greek Revolution. The meeting was inaugurated in 1954 and was held at the stadium of Messiniakos until 1968, when a military coup d'état ceased festivities. The athletics meeting was revived in 1984 and events held in the Kalamata Metropolitan Stadium were mainly contested between local athletes. In 1994 the meeting expanded to include international athletes. Past participants include Olympic gold medallists Stefka Kostadinova and Yelena Yelesina and English sprinters Dwain Chambers and John Regis.
