= Míting Internacional d'Atletisme Ciutat de Barcelona =

Annual athletics meeting held in Barcelona, Spain

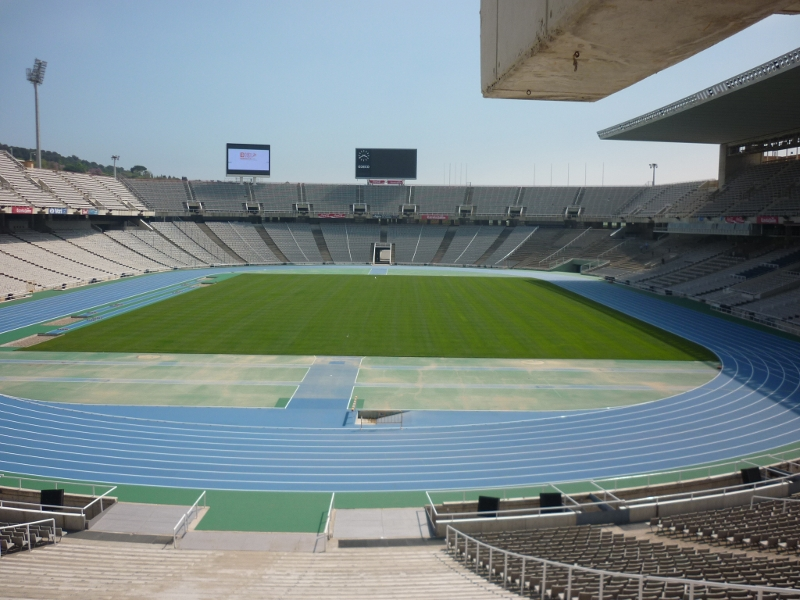
- Estadi Olímpic Lluís Companys - the host stadium
- Date: mid-July
- Location: Barcelona, Catalonia, Spain
- Event type: Athletics
- Established: 1982
- Website: fcatletisme.cat/mitingbcn2026

The Míting Internacional d'Atletisme Ciutat de Barcelona (also known as the Reunión Internacional Ciudad de Barcelona) is an annual athletics meeting held at the Estadi Olímpic Lluís Companys in Barcelona, Catalonia, Spain. The Meeting was held annually from 1982 to 1990, in 1993 and annually from 1998 to 2000. Before 1990 it was held at Estadi Municipal Joan Serrahima. Re-established in 2008, it is usually held in mid-July. In 2011 it was a European Athletics premium meeting. The 2017 and 2018 editions returned to Estadio Municipal Joan Serrahima.

== Meeting records ==
=== Men ===
Men's meeting records of the Míting Internacional d'Atletisme Ciutat de Barcelona
Event	Record	Athlete	Nationality	Date	Ref.
100 m	10.07 (+1.2 m/s)	Mason Lawyer	United States	7 July 2026	
150 m	15.54 (+1.0 m/s)	Daniel Rodríguez Serrano	Spain	22 September 2020	
200 m	20.06 (−0.6 m/s)	Michael Johnson	United States	16 July 1990	
400 m	44.78	Danny Everett	United States	16 July 1990	
500 m	1:00.82	Pablo Sánchez-Valladares	Spain	22 September 2020	
800 m	1:43.08	Ayanleh Souleiman	Djibouti	8 July 2015	
1500 m	3:31.97	Andrés Díaz	Spain	29 July 1999	
Mile	3:54.62	José Luis González Sánchez	Spain	15 July 1987	
3000 m	7:40.62	Ouassim Oumaiz Errouch	Spain	22 September 2020	
5000 m	12:55.72	Moses Masai	Kenya	19 July 2008	
110 m hurdles	13.18	Greg Foster	United States	16 July 1990	
300 m hurdles	36.23	Javier Delgado Osorio	Spain	22 September 2020	
400 m hurdles	47.73	Danny Harris	United States	16 July 1990	
2000 m steeplechase	5:26.78	Fernando Carro Morillo	Spain	22 September 2020	
3000 m steeplechase	8:12.64	Wilson Boit Kipketer	Kenya	25 July 2000	
High jump	2.35 m	Patrick Sjöberg	Sweden	15 July 1987	
Pole vault	5.90 m	Sergey Bubka	Ukraine	13 July 1988	
Long jump	8.51 m	Carl Lewis	United States	16 July 1990	
Triple jump	17.71 m	Willie Banks	United States	8 July 1985	
Shot put	21.64 m	Tomasz Majewski	Poland	25 July 2009	
Discus throw	69.08 m	Luis Delís	Cuba	8 July 1985	
Hammer throw	81.22 m	Balázs Kiss	Hungary	25 July 1998	
Javelin throw	80.30 m	Dawid Wegner	Poland	9 July 2025	
5000 m walk	20:04.73	José Antonio González	Spain	2 June 2007	
10,000 m walk	43:30.42	Jordi Llopart	Spain	10 June 1982	
4 × 100 m relay	37.93	Santa Monica Track Club: Mark Witherspoon; Floyd Heard; Leroy Burrell; Carl Lewis	United States	16 July 1990	
4 × 400 m relay	3:18.62	Diéguez; Jesús Ariño; Jose Vargas; Andrés Ballbé	Spain	16 July 1983	

=== Women ===
Women's meeting records of the Míting Internacional d'Atletisme Ciutat de Barcelona
Event	Record	Athlete	Nationality	Date	Ref.
100 m	11.18	Debbie Ferguson	Bahamas	25 July 1998	
100 m	11.18 (+1.3 m/s)	María Isabel Pérez Rodríguez	Spain	19 May 2024	
150 m	17.90	Estela García	Spain	22 September 2020	
200 m	21.98	Veronica Campbell	Jamaica	19 July 2008	
300 m	37.30	Estela García	Spain	11 July 2018	
400 m	50.95	Antonina Yefremova	Ukraine	9 July 2010	
600 m	1:26.21	Laura Bueno	Spain	11 July 2018	
800 m	1:57.95	Doina Melinte	Romania	12 July 1989	
1500 m	3:54.11	Genzebe Dibaba	Ethiopia	22 July 2015	
Mile	4:31.73	Marta Pen Freitas	Portugal	22 September 2020	
3000 m	8:52.41	Angela Tooby	United Kingdom	13 July 1988	
5000 m	14:45.63	Letesenbet Gidey	Ethiopia	30 June 2016	
100 m hurdles	12.61	Yordanka Donkova	Bulgaria	8 July 1984	
300 m hurdles	40.48	Sara Gallego Sotelo	Spain	22 September 2020	
400 m hurdles	54.20	Emily Newnham	Great Britain	7 July 2026	
2000 m steeplechase	6:16.46	Michelle Finn	Ireland	22 September 2020	
3000 m steeplechase	9:09.39	Marta Domínguez Azpeleta	Spain	25 July 2009	
High jump	2.00 m	Chaunté Lowe	United States	9 July 2010	
High jump	2.00 m	Blanka Vlašić	Croatia	9 July 2010	
Pole vault	4.73 m	Eliza McCartney	New Zealand	22 July 2023	
Long jump	6.89 m	Vali Ionescu	Romania	16 July 1986	
Triple jump	14.95 m	Françoise Mbango	Cameroon	19 July 2008	
Shot put	20.82 m	Helena Fibingerová	Czechoslovakia	8 July 1984	
Discus throw	69.90 m	Ilke Wyludda	East Germany	16 July 1990	
Hammer throw	74.22 m	Alexandra Tavernier	France	22 September 2020	
Javelin throw	64.25 m	Tatyana Shikolenko	Russia	29 July 1999	
5000 m walk	21:09.04	Raquel González Campos	Spain	30 June 2016	
4 × 100 m relay	44.41	María Paz Minicozzi; Yolanda Díaz; Cristina Castro; Sandra Myers	Spain	16 July 1990	
