= Mixed 4 × 400 metres relay =

Mixed-gender track and field event covering 1600 metres

Athletics Mixed 4 × 400 metres relay
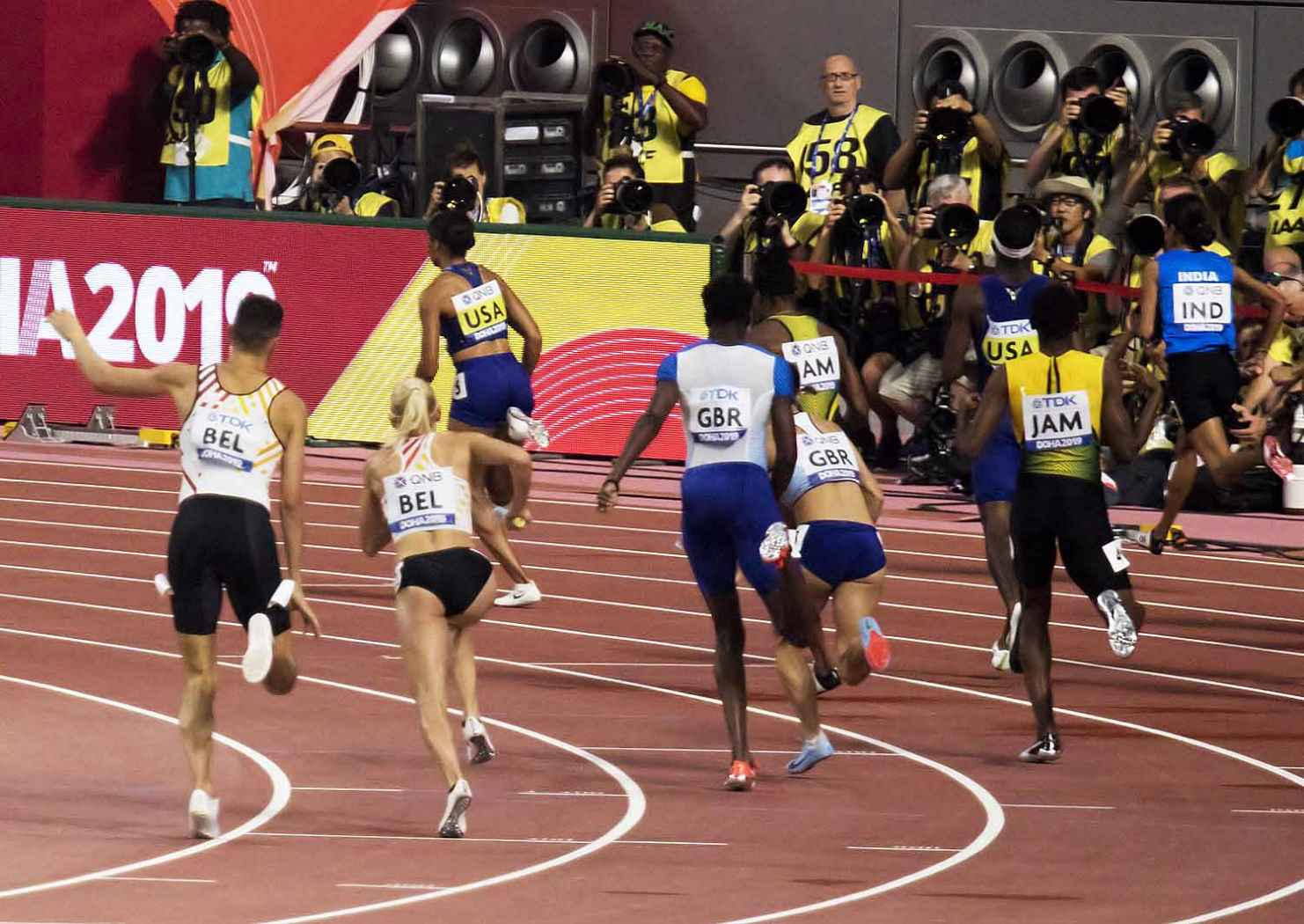
- Male runners hand over to female runners during the 2019 World Championships

World records
- Mixed: United States (Vernon Norwood (M), Shamier Little (F), Bryce Deadmon (M), Kaylyn Brown (F)) 3:07.41 (2024)

Olympic records
- Mixed: United States (Vernon Norwood (M), Shamier Little (F), Bryce Deadmon (M), Kaylyn Brown (F)) 3:07.41 (2024)

World Championship records
- Mixed: United States (Justin Robinson (M), Rosey Effiong (F), Matthew Boling (M), Alexis Holmes (F)) 3:08.80 (2023)

The mixed 4 × 400 metres relay is a mixed-sex 4 × 400 metres relay in which teams field two men and two women. Initially, teams were free to arrange participants in any order. This created scenarios where mixed genders run on the same leg. This was changed in March 2022, where team members run in the order: man-woman-man-woman. It was introduced at the 2017 IAAF World Relays and was then held at the 2019 World Athletics Championships in Qatar.

== Background ==
Part of the rationale for the event was that should teams put their men and women in different orders, there will be excitement in seeing large leads being reversed when men and women are running against each other. All the teams in the finals at the 2017 IAAF World Relays ran man-woman-woman-man. In the final of the event's World Athletics Championship debut in 2019, all but one team chose a man-woman-woman-man order, with the exception of Poland, who chose man-man-woman-woman. In March 2022, the rule was changed so that every team must use the order man-woman-man-woman.

Michael Johnson commentating at the 2019 World Athletics Championships expressed a concern that, while entertaining, the mixed 4 × 400 metres event contributes to an overly busy schedule.

Poland won the inaugural Olympic 4 × 400 metres mixed relay at the 2020 Summer Olympics, held in 2021.

== Records ==
=== Global records ===
Global records in the mixed 4 × 400 metres relay
Record	Time	Country	Members	Place	Date	Ref.
World record	3:07.41	United States	Vernon Norwood, Shamier Little, Bryce Deadmon, Kaylyn Brown	Saint-Denis, France	2 August 2024	
Olympic record	3:07.41	United States	Vernon Norwood, Shamier Little, Bryce Deadmon, Kaylyn Brown	Saint-Denis, France	2 August 2024	
Short track world record	3:12.44	Vacant				
Short track world best	3:15.63 i	Netherlands	Nick Smidt, Eveline Saalberg, Tony van Diepen, Femke Bol	Apeldoorn, Netherlands	6 March 2025	

==== Progression ====
The first world record recognised by the IAAF was set by the US team at 3:12.42 in the first heat at the 2019 World Athletics Championships on 28 September 2019, beating a prior world best by the US set in 2016. The US team then set a new record of 3:09.34 in the final the next day. During the 2023 World Athletics Championships, team USA bested the previous record with a time of 3:08:80. Team USA further improved the record in the first heat at the 2024 Olympics with a time of 3:07:41.

=== Area records ===
- Updated 22 May 2026.

Area	Time	Competition / Venue	Athletes	Nation
Africa (records)	3:09.87	2026 World Relays	George Mutinda, Mercy Oketch, Kelvin Tonui, Mercy Chebet	Kenya
Asia (records)	3:11.82	2019 World Athletics Championships	Musa Isah, Aminat Yusuf Jamal, Salwa Eid Naser, Abbas Abubakar Abbas	Bahrain
Europe (records)	3:07.43	2024 Summer Olympics	Eugene Omalla, Lieke Klaver, Isaya Klein Ikkink, Femke Bol	Netherlands
North, Central America and Caribbean (records)	3:07.41 WR	2024 Summer Olympics	Vernon Norwood, Shamier Little, Bryce Deadmon, Kaylyn Brown	United States
Oceania (records)	3:10.57	2026 World Relays	Cooper Sherman, Ellie Beer, Thomas Reynolds, Mia Gross	Australia
South America (records)	3:14.42	2025 Campeonato Nacional De Velocidad y Saltos	Nicolás Salinas, Lina Esther Licona Torres, Daniel Balanta, Evelis Aguilar	Colombia

== All-Time Top 10 by Country ==
- Correct as of August 2026.

Rank	Time	Team	Nation	Date	Place	Ref.
1	3:07.41	Vernon Norwood, Shamier Little, Bryce Deadmon, Kaylyn Brown	United States	2 August 2024	Paris	
2	3:07.43	Eugene Omalla, Lieke Klaver, Isaya Klein Ikkink, Femke Bol	Netherlands	3 August 2024	Paris	
3	3:08.01	Samuel Reardon, Laviai Nielsen, Alex Haydock-Wilson, Amber Anning	Great Britain	3 August 2024	Paris	
4	3:08.24	Deandre Watkin, Shana Kaye Anderson, Antonio Watson, Rushell Clayton	Jamaica	3 May 2026	Gaborone	
5	3:09.36	Jonathan Sacoor, Helena Ponette, Alexander Doom, Naomi Van Den Broeck	Belgium	3 August 2024	Paris	
6	3:09.43	Maksymilian Szwed, Justyna Święty-Ersetic, Daniel Soltysiak, Natalia Bukowiecka	Poland	29 June 2025	Madrid	
7	3:09.62	Karsten Warholm, Amalie Iuel, Andreas Ofstad Kulseng, Henriette Jæger	Norway	10 August 2026	Birmingham	
8	3:09.66	Eduardo Scotti, Virginia Troiani, Vladimir Aceti, Alice Mangione	Italy	29 June 2025	Madrid	
9	3:09.82	Lidio Andrés Feliz, Marileidy Paulino, Alexander Ogando, Fiordaliza Cofil	Dominican Republic	15 July 2022	Eugene	
10	3:09.87	George Mutinda, Mercy Oketch, Kelvin Tonui, Mercy Chebet	Kenya	2 May 2026	Gaborone	

=== Short track ===
- Updated May 2026

Rank	Time	Team	Nation	Date	Place	Ref.
1	3:15.60	Jonathan Sacoor, Ilana Hanssens, Julien Watrin, Helena Ponette	Belgium	21 March 2026	Toruń	
2	3:15.63	Nick Smidt, Eveline Saalberg, Tony van Diepen, Femke Bol	Netherlands	6 March 2025	Apeldoorn	
3	3:16.49	Alastair Chalmers, Emily Newnham, Joshua Faulds, Lina Nielsen	Great Britain	6 March 2025	Apeldoorn	
4	3:16.96	Markel Fernandez, Paula Sevilla, David García, Blanca Hervas	Spain	21 March 2026	Toruń	
5	3:17.44	Kajetan Duszyński, Anna Gryc, Marcin Karolewski, Justyna Święty-Ersetic	Poland	21 March 2026	Toruń	
6	3:17.63	Conor Kelly, Phil Healy, Marcus Lawler, Sharlene Mawdsley	Ireland	6 March 2025	Apeldoorn	
7	3:19.17	Michal Desenský, Marcela Pírková, Milan Ščibráni, Tereza Petržilková	Czechia	6 March 2025	Apeldoorn	
8	3:21.35	Jevon O'Bryant, Sara Reifenrath, Steven McElroy, Taiya Shelby	United States	21 March 2026	Toruń	
9	3:22.36	João Coelho, Carina Vanessa, Vera Barbosa, Ericsson Tavares	Portugal	5 February 2022	Glasgow	
10	3:25.74	Natalija Švenda, Veronika Drljačić, Marino Bloudek, Karlo Videka	Croatia	18 January 2025	Zagreb	

== All-Time Top 25 ==
- Correct as of September 2026.

Rank	Time	Team	Nation	Date	Place	Ref.
1	3:07.41	Vernon Norwood, Shamier Little, Bryce Deadmon, Kaylyn Brown	United States	2 August 2024	Paris	
2	3:07.43	Eugene Omalla, Lieke Klaver, Isaya Klein Ikkink, Femke Bol	Netherlands	3 August 2024	Paris	
3	3:07.47	Bryce Deadmon, Paris Peoples, Jenoah McKiver, Bailey Lear	United States	3 May 2026	Gaborone	
4	3:07.74	Vernon Norwood, Shamier Little, Bryce Deadmon, Kaylyn Brown	United States	3 August 2024	Paris	
5	3:08.01	Samuel Reardon, Laviai Nielsen, Alex Haydock-Wilson, Amber Anning	Great Britain	3 August 2024	Paris	
6	3:08.24	Deandre Watkin, Shana Kaye Anderson, Antonio Watson, Rushell Clayton	Jamaica	3 May 2026	Gaborone	
7	3:08.32	Chris Bailey, Alexis Holmes, Jacory Patterson, Aaliyah Butler	United States	13 September 2026	Budapest	
8	3:08.80	Justin Robinson, Rosey Effiong, Matthew Boling, Alexis Holmes	United States	19 August 2023	Budapest	
8	3:08.80	Bryce Deadmon, Lynna Irby-Jackson, Jenoah McKiver, Alexis Holmes	United States	13 September 2025	Tokyo	
10	3:09.34	Wilbert London, Allyson Felix, Courtney Okolo, Michael Cherry	United States	29 September 2019	Doha	
11	3:09.36	Jonathan Sacoor, Helena Ponette, Alexander Doom, Naomi Van Den Broeck	Belgium	3 August 2024	Paris	
12	3:09.40	Ben Jefferies, Yemi Mary John, Toby Harries, Charlotte Henrich	Great Britain	13 September 2026	Budapest	
13	3:09.43	Maksymilian Szwed, Justyna Święty-Ersetic, Daniel Soltysiak, Natalia Bukowiecka	Poland	29 June 2025	Madrid	
14	3:09.54	Chris Robinson, Courtney Okolo, Johnnie Blockburger, Lynna Irby-Jackson	United States	11 May 2025	Guangzhou	
15	3:09.57	Jonas Phijffers, Lieke Klaver, Keenan Blake, Myrte van der Schoot	Netherlands	13 September 2026	Budapest	
16	3:09.62	Karsten Warholm, Amalie Iuel, Andreas Ofstad Kulseng, Henriette Jæger	Norway	10 August 2026	Birmingham	
17	3:09.66	Eduardo Scotti, Virginia Troiani, Vladimir Aceti, Alice Mangione	Italy	29 June 2025	Madrid	
17	3:09.66	Samuel Reardon, Lina Nielsen, Toby Harries, Emily Newnham	Great Britain	29 June 2025	Madrid	
19	3:09.69	Alex Haydock-Wilson, Lina Nielsen, Jake Minshull, Yemi Mary John	Great Britain	2 May 2026	Gaborone	
20	3:09.82	Lidio Andrés Feliz, Marileidy Paulino, Alexander Ogando, Fiordaliza Cofil	Dominican Republic	15 July 2022	Eugene	
20	3:09.82	Bryce Deadmon, Paris Peoples, Brian Faust, Bailey Lear	United States	2 May 2026	Gaborone	
22	3:09.84	Alex Haydock-Wilson, Lina Nielsen, Jake Minshull, Yemi Mary John	Great Britain	3 May 2026	Gaborone	
23	3:09.87	Karol Zalewski, Natalia Kaczmarek, Justyna Święty-Ersetic, Kajetan Duszyński	Poland	31 July 2021	Tokyo	
23	3:09.87	George Mutinda, Mercy Oketch, Kelvin Tonui, Mercy Chebet	Kenya	2 May 2026	Gaborone	
25	3:09.89	David García, Paula Sevilla, Julio Arenas, Blanca Hervás	Spain	2 May 2026	Gaborone	

=== Short track ===
- Updated May 2026

Rank	Time	Team	Nation	Date	Place	Ref.
1	3:15.60	Jonathan Sacoor, Ilana Hanssens, Julien Watrin, Helena Ponette	Belgium	21 March 2026	Toruń	
2	3:15.63	Nick Smidt, Eveline Saalberg, Tony van Diepen, Femke Bol	Netherlands	6 March 2025	Apeldoorn	
3	3:16.19	Julien Watrin, Imke Vervaet, Christian Iguacel, Helena Ponette	Belgium	6 March 2025	Apeldoorn	
4	3:16.49	Alastair Chalmers, Emily Newnham, Joshua Faulds, Lina Nielsen	Great Britain	6 March 2025	Apeldoorn	
5	3:16.96	Markel Fernandez, Paula Sevilla, David García, Blanca Hervas	Spain	21 March 2026	Toruń	
6	3:17.12	Manuel Guijarro, Carmen Avilés, Bernat Erta, Daniela Fra	Spain	6 March 2025	Apeldoorn	
7	3:17.44	Kajetan Duszyński, Anna Gryc, Marcin Karolewski, Justyna Święty-Ersetic	Poland	21 March 2026	Toruń	
8	3:17.63	Conor Kelly, Phil Healy, Marcus Lawler, Sharlene Mawdsley	Ireland	6 March 2025	Apeldoorn	
9	3:18.90	Iñaki Cañal, Aauri Bokesa, Sara Gallego, Bernat Erta	Spain	5 February 2022	Glasgow	
10	3:19.17	Michal Desenský, Marcela Pírková, Milan Ščibráni, Tereza Petržilková	Czechia	6 March 2025	Apeldoorn	
11	3:19.78		Ireland	15 January 2025	Dublin	
12	3:20.14	Keenan Blake, Myrte van der Schoot, Tony Van Diepen, Eveline Saalberg	Netherlands	21 March 2026	Toruń	
13	3:21.35	Jevon O'Bryant, Sara Reifenrath, Steven McElroy, Taiya Shelby	United States	21 March 2026	Toruń	
14	3:22.23	James Williams, Susanna Banjo, Hannah Kelly, Ben Higgins	England	5 February 2022	Glasgow	
15	3:22.36	João Coelho, Carina Vanessa, Vera Barbosa, Ericsson Tavares	Portugal	5 February 2022	Glasgow	
16
17
18
19
20
21
22
23
24
25

== Olympic medalists ==
Year	Gold		Silver		Bronze	
2021	Poland	3:09.87 OR, AR	Dominican Republic	3:10.21 NR	United States	3:10.22 SB
2024	Netherlands	3:07.43 AR	United States	3:07.74	Great Britain	3:08.01 NR

== World Athletics Championships ==
Year	Gold		Silver		Bronze	
2019	United States (USA)	3:09.34 WR	Jamaica (JAM)	3:11.78 NR	Bahrain (BHR)	3:11.82 AR
2022	Dominican Republic (DOM)	3:09.82 NR	Netherlands (NED)	3:09.90 NR	United States (USA)	3:10.16
2023	United States (USA)	3:08.80 WR	Great Britain (GBR)	3:11.06 NR	Czech Republic (CZE)	3:11.98 NR
2025	United States (USA)	3:08.80 =CR	Netherlands (NED)	3:09.96	Belgium (BEL)	3:10.61

== World Athletics Relays ==
Year	Gold		Silver		Bronze	
2017	Bahamas (BAH)	3:14.42 CR	United States (USA)	3:17.29	Jamaica (JAM)	3:20.26
2019	United States (USA)	3:16.43	Canada (CAN)	3:18.15	Kenya (KEN)	3:19.43
2021	Italy (ITA)	3:16.60	Brazil (BRA)	3:17.54	Dominican Republic (DOM)	3:17.58
2024	United States (USA)	3:10.73 CR	Netherlands (NED)	3:11.45	Ireland (IRE)	3:11.53
2025	United States (USA)	3:09.54 CR	Australia (AUS)	3:12.20	Kenya (KEN)	3:13.10
2026	United States (USA)	3:07.47 CR	Jamaica (JAM)	3:08.24	Great Britain (GBR)	3:09.69
