= 2026 World Athletics Relays – Mixed 4 × 400 metres relay =

Mixed 4 × 400 metres relay at the 2026 World Athletics Relays
- Venue: Botswana National Stadium, Gaborone
- Dates: 2 May (heats); 3 May (repechage round & final)
- Winning time: 3:07.47 CR

Medalists
gold medal	Bryce Deadmon; Paris Peoples; Jenoah McKiver; Bailey Lear; Brian Faust*	United States
silver medal	Deandre Watkin; Shana Kaye Anderson; Antonio Watson; Rushell Clayton	Jamaica
bronze medal	Alex Haydock-Wilson; Lina Nielsen; Jake Minshull; Yemi Mary John	Great Britain

The mixed 4 × 400 metres relay at the 2026 World Athletics Relays was held at the Botswana National Stadium in Gaborone, Botswana on 2 and 3 May 2026.

The event will serve as a qualifying event for the 2026 World Athletics Ultimate Championships in Budapest and the 2027 World Athletics Championships in Beijing. In this context, the top six teams in the final will secure direct entry to Budapest, while the top 12 teams in each event will qualify for Beijing.

== Records ==
Prior to the competition, the records were as follows:

Record	Team	Time	Location	Date
World record	United States (Vernon Norwood, Shamier Little, Bryce Deadmon, Kaylyn Brown)	3:07.41	Saint-Denis, France	2 August 2024
Championships record	United States (Chris Robinson, Courtney Okolo, Johnnie Blockburger, Lynna Irby-Jackson)	3:09.54	Guangzhou, China	11 May 2025
2026 World Leading	Kenya (Allan Kipyego, Mercy Oketch, Kevin Kipkorir, Mercy Chebet)	3:14.04	Gaborone, Botswana	28 March 2026

== Qualification ==
The top 8 teams in each event at the 2025 World Athletics Championships automatically qualify for entry to the championships. The remaining teams (up to 24 in total per event ) will be determined through the top lists in the qualification period from 1 January 2025 to 5 April 2026. Host country Botswana can enter with one team in each event, regardless of any entry conditions.

== Program ==
All times are local (UTC+2).

Date	Time	Round
2 May 2026	14:30	Heats
3 May 2026	14:20	Repechage round
3 May 2026	16:13	Final

== Results ==
=== Heats (World Championships Qualifying Round 1) ===
The heats were held on 2 May 2026, starting at 14:30 in the afternoon. Qualification: the first 2 of each heat (WQ) plus 2 fastest times (Wq) qualify to World Athletics Championships and World Athletics Relays Final.

==== Heat 1 ====
Rank	Lane	Nation	Competitors	Time	Notes
1	5	United States	Bryce Deadmon, Paris Peoples, Brian Faust, Bailey Lear	3:09.82	WQ, WL
2	7	Spain	David García, Paula Sevilla, Julio Arenas, Blanca Hervás	3:09.89	WQ, NR
3	8	Australia	Cooper Sherman, Ellie Beer, Thomas Reynolds, Mia Gross	3:10.57	Wq, AR
4	4	Ireland	Jack Raftery, Sophie Becker, Sean Doggett, Sharlene Mawdsley	3:12.05	SB
5	6	Belgium	Julien Watrin, Ilana Hanssens, Dylan Borlée, Camille Laus	3:15.26	SB
6	3	India	Theertesh P. Shetty, Ansa Babu, Amoj Jacob, Rashdeep Kaur	3:16.00	SB
	2	Uganda	Kenneth Omuka, Mauren Akiiki Banura, Haron Adoli, Leni Shida	DQ	

==== Heat 2 ====
Rank	Lane	Nation	Competitors	Time	Notes
1	7	Jamaica	Deandre Watkin, Shana Kaye Anderson, Antonio Watson, Rushell Clayton	3:11.68	WQ, SB
2	4	Poland	Marcin Karolewski, Justyna Święty-Ersetic, Kajetan Duszyński, Natalia Bukowiecka	3:13.00	WQ, SB
3	3	Nigeria	Samson Oghenewegba Nathaniel, Taiwo Mary Kudoro, Chidi Okezie, Patience Okon George	3:13.12	SB
4	6	Japan	Kira Hirakawa, Abigeirufuka Ido, Kentaro Sato, Nanako Matsumoto	3:13.61	SB
5	8	Canada	Ryder Rattee, Savannah Sutherland, Nathan George, Emma Cannan	3:14.93	SB
6	5	Netherlands	Liemarvin Bonevacia, Elisabeth Paulina, Terrence Agard, Madelief van Leur	3:15.49	SB
7	2	China	Longyu Guo, Fengdan Li, Heng Xiao, Yinglan Liu	3:18.47	SB

==== Heat 3 ====
Rank	Lane	Nation	Competitors	Time	Notes
1	6	Great Britain	Alex Haydock-Wilson, Lina Nielsen, Jake Minshull, Yemi Mary John	3:09.69	WQ, WL
2	4	Kenya	George Mutinda, Mercy Oketch, Kelvin Tonui, Mercy Chebet	3:09.87	WQ, AR
3	7	Italy	Lorenzo Benati, Anna Polinari, Vladimir Aceti, Eloisa Coiro	3:10.60	Wq, SB
4	8	France	Muhammad Abdallah Kounta, Amandine Brossier, Predea Manounou, Louise Maraval	3:11.07	SB
5	5	South Africa	Gardeo Isaacs, Rogail Joseph, Lythe Pillay, Marlie Viljoen	3:11.19	SB
6	3	Germany	Tyrel Prenz, Luna Bulmahn, Florian Kroll, Eileen Demes	3:15.28	SB
7	1	Botswana	Boitumelo Masilo, Karabo Mantswinyane, Lefatshe Seleka, Lebitso Mokorofu	3:18.23	SB
	2	Ethiopia	Nhial Nyang, Banchalem Bikese, Eriema Kere, Ajayeba Aliye	DQ	

=== Repechage Round (World Championships Qualifying Round 2) ===
The repechage round was held on 3 May 2026, starting at 14:20 in the afternoon. Qualification: First 2 of each heat qualify to World Athletics Championships (WQ).

==== Heat 1 ====
Rank	Lane	Nation	Competitors	Time	Notes
1	6	Canada	Nathan George, Ella Clayton, Ryder Rattee, Dianna Proctor	3:12.43	WQ, NR
2	7	Belgium	Julien Watrin, Ilana Hanssens, Dylan Borlée, Camille Laus	3:12.79	WQ, SB
3	4	Japan	Kira Hirakawa, Abigeirufuka Ido, Kentaro Sato, Nanako Matsumoto	3:12.86	SB
4	5	China	Longyu Guo, Fengdan Li, Heng Xiao, Yinglan Liu	3:16.95	SB
5	8	India	Theertesh P. Shetty, Ansa Babu, Amoj Jacob, Rashdeep Kaur	3:19.40	
	3	Ethiopia	Nhial Nyang, Banchalem Bikese, Eriema Kere, Ajayeba Aliye	DQ	TR17.2.3

==== Heat 2 ====
Rank	Lane	Nation	Competitors	Time	Notes
1	4	South Africa	Gardeo Isaacs, Rogail Joseph, Bradley Maponyane, Marlie Viljoen	3:12.77	WQ
2	8	Nigeria	Samson Oghenewegba Nathaniel, Taiwo Mary Kudoro, Chidi Okezie, Patience Okon George	3:12.88	WQ, SB
3	7	Germany	Tyrel Prenz, Skadi Schier, Florian Kroll, Jana Lakner	3:12.99	SB
4	3	Botswana	Leungo Scotch, Karabo Mantswinyane, Boitumelo Masilo, Obakeng Kamberuka	3:13.51	NR
5	2	Uganda	Kenneth Omuka, Mauren Akiiki Banura, Haron Adoli, Leni Shida	3:15.45	SB
6	5	Netherlands	Terrence Agard, Madelief van Leur, Liemarvin Bonevacia, Andrea Bouma	3:16.33	
7	6	Ireland	Jack Raftery, Jenna Breen, Sean Doggett, Erin Friel	3:19.34	

=== Final (World Ultimate Championships Qualifying Round) ===
Rank	Lane	Nation	Competitors	Time	Notes
1st place, gold medalist(s)	6	United States	Bryce Deadmon, Paris Peoples, Jenoah McKiver, Bailey Lear	3:07.47	CR
2nd place, silver medalist(s)	4	Jamaica	Deandre Watkin, Shana Kaye Anderson, Antonio Watson, Rushell Clayton	3:08.24	NR
3rd place, bronze medalist(s)	5	Great Britain	Alex Haydock-Wilson, Lina Nielsen, Jake Minshull, Yemi Mary John	3:09.84	
4	7	Kenya	George Mutinda, Mercy Chebet, Kelvin Tonui, Mercy Oketch	3:09.93	
5	2	Italy	Lorenzo Benati, Anna Polinari, Vladimir Aceti, Eloisa Coiro	3:10.52	SB
6	8	Spain	David García, Eva Santidrián, Julio Arenas, Carmen Avilés	3:13.05	
7	1	Australia	Cooper Sherman, Mia Gross, Matthew Hunt, Alexia Loizou	3:13.07	
	3	Poland	Marcin Karolewski, Alicja Wrona-Kutrzepa Kajetan Duszyński, Karolina Łozowska	DNF	
