= 2026 World Athletics Indoor Championships – Mixed 4 × 400 metres relay =

Mixed 4 × 400 metres relay at the 2026 World Athletics Indoor Championships
- Venue: Kujawsko-Pomorska Arena Toruń
- Location: Toruń, Poland
- Dates: 21 March
- Winning time: 3:15.60

Medalists
gold medal	Jonathan Sacoor; Julien Watrin; Helena Ponette; Ilana Hanssens	Belgium
silver medal	Markel Fernandez; David Garcia; Paula Sevilla; Blanca Hervas	Spain
bronze medal	Karol Zalewski; Kajetan Duszynski; Natalia Kaczmarek; Justyna Swiety-Ersetic	Poland

The mixed 4 × 400 metres relay at the 2026 World Athletics Indoor Championships took place on the short track of the Kujawsko-Pomorska Arena Toruń in Toruń, Poland, on 21 March 2026. This was the first time mixed 4 × 400 metres relay will be contested at the World Athletics Indoor Championships.

== Background ==
This is the first time mixed 4 × 400 metres relay will be contested at the World Athletics Indoor Championships.

Records before the 2026 World Athletics Indoor Championships
Record	Team	Time (s)	Location	Date
World record	Vacant	3:12.44	—	
Championship record	Vacant	—		
2026 World Lead	Vacant	—		

== Qualification ==
For the mixed 4 × 400 metres relay, there is no entry standard, and every Member Federation will be able to enter one team up to eight athletes in each event.

== Results ==
=== Final ===
The final was held on 21 March, starting at 12:00 (UTC+1) in the morning.

Rank	Lane	Country	Athletes	Time	Notes
1st place, gold medalist(s)	3	Belgium	Jonathan Sacoor, Ilana Hanssens, Julien Watrin, Helena Ponette	3:15.60	SB
2nd place, silver medalist(s)	1	Spain	Markel Fernández, Paula Sevilla, David García, Blanca Hervás	3:16.96	SB
3rd place, bronze medalist(s)	4	Poland	Kajetan Duszyński, Anna Gryc, Marcin Karolewski, Justyna Święty-Ersetic	3:17.44	SB
4	6	Netherlands	Keenan Blake, Myrte van der Schoot, Tony van Diepen, Eveline Saalberg	3:20.14	SB
5	5	United States	Jevon O'Bryant, Sara Reifenrath, Steven McElroy, Taiya Shelby	3:21.35	SB
	2	Jamaica	Delano Kennedy, Shana Kaye Anderson, Kimar Farquharson, Leah Anderson	DQ	
