= Joshua Faulds =

British runner (born 2000)

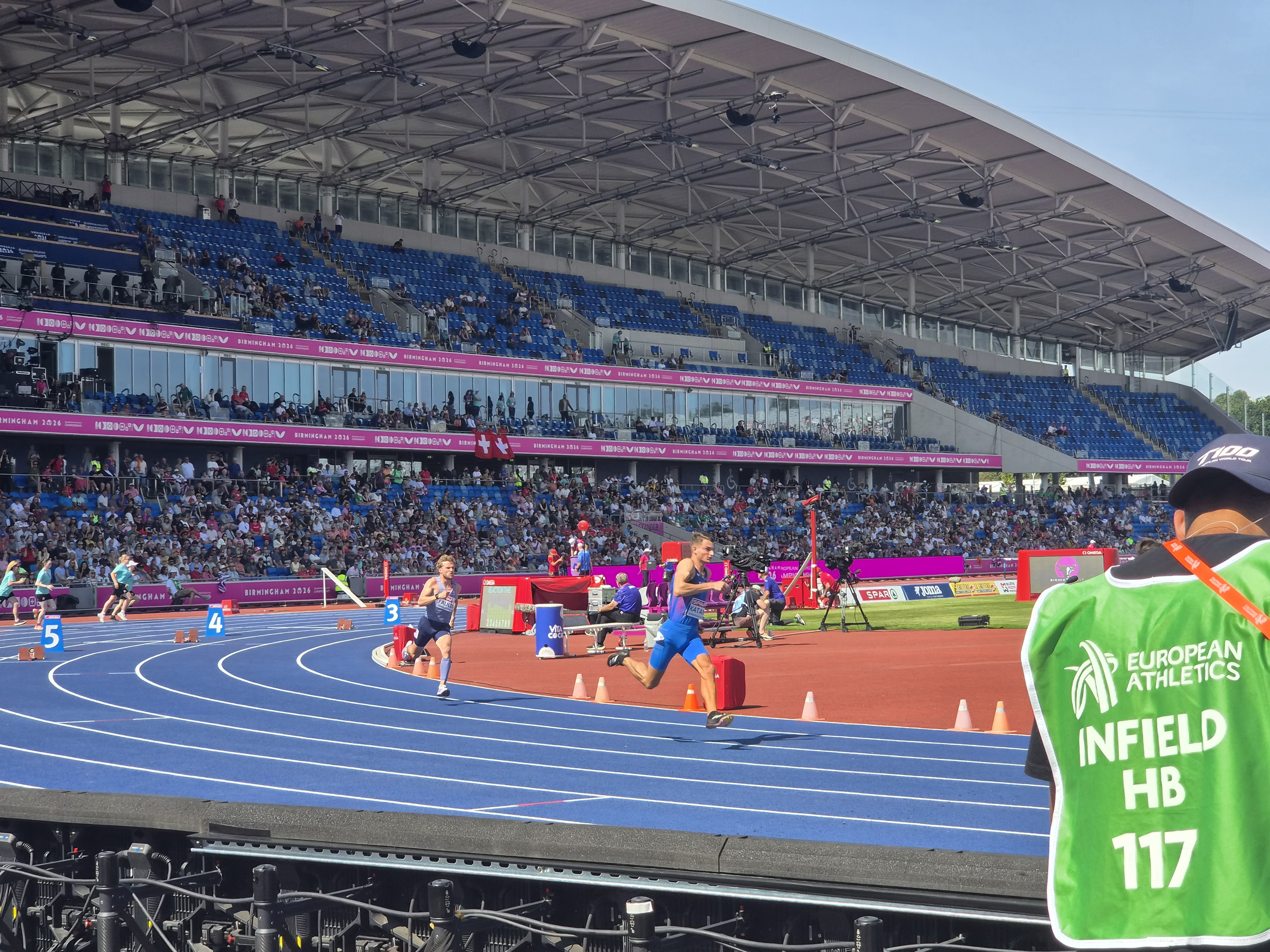
- Faulds competing for Great Britain in 2026

Personal information
- Born: 7 March 2000 (age 26)

Sport
- Sport: Athletics
- Events: Sprint, Hurdles

Achievements and titles
- Personal bests: 400m: 46.85 (Birmingham, 2025); 400m hurdles 48.59 (Brussels, 2025)
Medal record
Men's athletics
Representing Great Britain
European Indoor Championships
Bronze medal – third place	2025 Apeldoorn	Mixed 4x400 m relay

Joshua Faulds (born 7 March 2000) is a British hurdler. He has competed internationally over 400 metres hurdles and was runner-up at the 2025 British Indoor Athletics Championships over 400 metres.

== Biography ==
Faulds made his senior championship debut in the 400 metres hurdles at the 2022 European Athletics Championships in Munich.

Faulds ran a personal best 46.85 seconds to finish runner-up behind Alex Haydock-Wilson in the final of the 400 metres at the 2025 British Indoor Athletics Championships in Birmingham, on 23 February 2025.

Faulds was selected for the British team for the 2025 European Athletics Indoor Championships in Apeldoorn, winning a bronze medal in the mixed 4 × 400 m relay. He later ran in the men's 4x400 metres relay with his British team placing fourth overall. He was selected for the 2025 World Athletics Relays in May 2025, where he in the mixed 4 x 400 metres relay, alongside Sam Lunt, Emily Newnham and Nicole Yeargin as the British quartet won their heat to qualify for the final and secure a place for Britain at the 2025 World Championships. Later that month, he lowered his personal best to 48.59 seconds for the 400m hurdles whilst competing in Brussels. On 2 August, he qualified for the final of the 400 metres hurdles at the 2025 UK Athletics Championships in Birmingham, placing fourth overall.

In February 2026, Faulds was a finalist over 400 metres at the 2026 British Indoor Athletics Championships in Birmingham, placing fourth overall. Faulds was named in the British squad for the 4 x 400 metres relay at the 2026 World Athletics Relays in Gaborone, Botswana. On 21 June, he finished runner-up in the 400 metres hurdles final at the 2026 UK Athletics Championships. Faulds competed in the 400 metres hurdles at the 2026 Commonwealth Games in Glasgow, Scotland. On 12 August, he ran in the semi-finals of the 2026 European Athletics Championships in Birmingham, England.

== Personal life ==
He attended Harris Church of England Academy in Rugby, Warwickshire. His brother Ed Faulds is also an athlete.
