= Jake Minshull =

British athlete (born 2004)

Personal information
- Nationality: British
- Born: 11 October 2004 (age 22)

Sport
- Sport: Athletics
- Event: Hurdling

Achievements and titles
- Personal bests: 400m: 46.32 (London, 2025); 400m hurdles: 48.53 (Karlstad, 2026) NU23R
Medal record
Men's athletics
Representing Great Britain
World Relays
Bronze medal – third place	2026 Gaborone	4 × 400 m mixed
European U20 Championships
Gold medal – first place	2023 Jerusalem	4x400m relay
Representing England
Commonwealth Games
Silver medal – second place	2026 Glasgow	400m hurdles

Jake Minshull (born 11 October 2004) is a British hurdler and sprinter. In 2026 he became the British under-23 record holder in the 400 metres hurdles and won the silver medal representing England at the 2026 Commonwealth Games.

== Biography ==
Minshull is a member of Godiva Harriers in Coventry and attends the University of Birmingham. He initially competed competed in multi-events and middle-distance before focusing on the 400 metres hurdles. Minshull also played rugby union for Old Coventrians RFC and was in the rugby academy of Wasps RFC.

In December 2021, Minshull won a silver medal competing for England at the SIAB Indoor Pentathlon Championships in Glasgow, with 3866 points. In February 2022, he lowered his personal best in the 800 metres indoors to 1:54.52 before winning gold in the under-20 category at the England Athletics Age Group Indoor Championships in Sheffield with an indoor personal best time of 1:52.89.

In July 2022, he won at the English Schools Championships in the Senior Boys' 400 metres hurdles in 51.73 seconds, to set a new personal best and club record time. Minshull was a gold medalist in the 4 x 400 metres relay at the 2023 European Athletics U20 Championships in Jerusalem, Israel alongside David Race, Sam Lunt and Charlie Carvell.

In May 2025, he won the 400 metres hurdles at the Loughborough International competing for England, running a time of 49.86 seconds. Later that month, he lowered his personal best to 48.88 seconds for the 400m hurdles whilst competing in Brussels. He was named in the British team for the 2025 European Athletics U23 Championships in Bergen, winning his heat in 50.03 seconds, before placing fifth in the final in 49.18 seconds. On 2 August, he qualified for the final of the 400 metres hurdles at the 2025 UK Athletics Championships in Birmingham, beating Seamus Derbyshire on the line of his semi-final. The following day in the final he was well-placed on the back straight but fell at the final hurdle. In October 2025, he was named on the British Athletics Olympic Futures Programme for 2025/26.

On 31 January 2026, Minshull claimed a notable indoors victory, including over 2024 European and World Indoor champion Alexander Doom, running 46.51 for the 400 metres in Glasgow, more than a second faster than his previous indoor personal best.

Minshull was named in the British squad for the 4 x 400 metres relay at the 2026 World Athletics Relays in Gaborone, Botswana. On the opening day of the competition he was part of the British mixed 4 x 400 m team which qualified for the final with the fastest time of 3:09.69. The following day, he was part of the British quartet that won the bronze medal in the event alongside Alex Haydock-Wilson, Lina Nielsen and Yemi Mary John. On 21 June, he finished third in the 400 metres hurdles final at the 2026 UK Athletics Championships. The following month, he ran a new British under-23 record for the 400 m hurdles with 48.53 seconds at the Folksam Grand Prix in Karlstad, Sweden. He was selected to represent England at the 2026 Commonwealth Games in Glasgow, winning the silver medal in the final of the 400 metres hurdles behind Ezekiel Nathaniel of Nigeria. On 12 August, he ran in the semi-finals of the 2026 European Athletics Championships in Birmingham, England. In October 2026, he was moved up to the confirmation level in the 2026-27 Olympic World Class Programme awarded by UK Athletics.
