= Vernon Norwood =

American sprinter (born 1992)

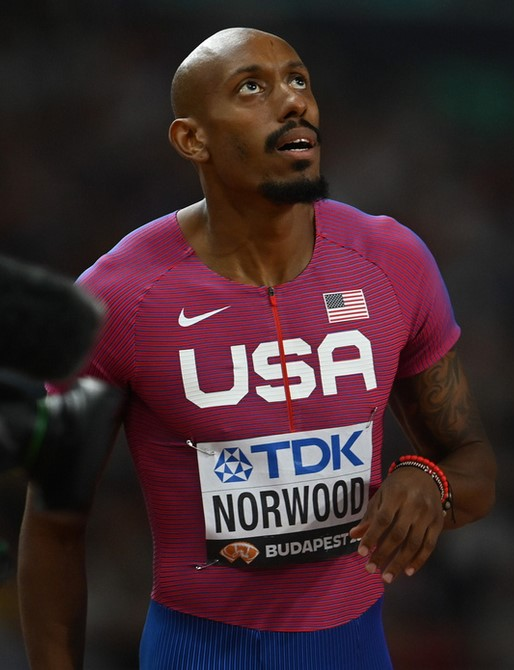
- Norwood in 2023

Personal information
- Full name: Vernon Larnard Norwood
- Born: April 10, 1992 (age 34) New Orleans, Louisiana, U.S.
- Height: 1.88 m (6 ft 2 in)
- Weight: 73 kg (161 lb)

Sport
- Country: United States
- Sport: Track and field
- Event: 400 metres
- College team: LSU Tigers track and field
- Club: New Balance
- Turned pro: 2015

Achievements and titles
- Personal bests: 400 meters: 44.10; 200 meters: 20.30; 4 × 400 meters: 2:54.43; Mixed 4 × 400 meters: 3:07.41 WR; 300 meters: 32.70
Medal record
Men's athletics
Representing the United States
Olympic Games
Gold medal – first place	2020 Tokyo	4 × 400 m relay
Gold medal – first place	2024 Paris	4 × 400 m relay
Silver medal – second place	2024 Paris	4 × 400 m mixed
Bronze medal – third place	2020 Tokyo	4 × 400 m mixed
World Championships
Gold medal – first place	2015 Beijing	4 × 400 m relay
Gold medal – first place	2019 Doha	4 × 400 m relay
Gold medal – first place	2022 Eugene	4 × 400 m relay
Gold medal – first place	2023 Budapest	4 × 400 m relay
Silver medal – second place	2025 Tokyo	4 x 400 m relay
Bronze medal – third place	2022 Eugene	4 × 400 m mixed
World Indoor Championships
Gold medal – first place	2016 Portland	4 × 400 m relay
Silver medal – second place	2018 Birmingham	4 × 400 m relay
World Relays
Gold medal – first place	2019 Yokohama	4 × 200 m relay
- Updated on August 28, 2025

Vernon Larnard Norwood (born April 10, 1992) is an American track and field athlete who specializes in the 400 meters. He has four Olympic medals in relay events. Norwood holds the world record in the mixed 4 × 400 meters relay with teammates Shamier Little, Bryce Deadmon, and Kaylyn Brown. With six medals, he is one of the most successful athletes at the World Athletics Championships.

== Biography ==
Raised in New Orleans, Louisiana, he is the son of Curtis Norwood and Charliette Ray. Norwood started running track in his junior year at Morgan City High School.

=== College ===
For South Plains College, Norwood was a multiple time NJCAA national champion.

For the LSU Tigers, he was a four time NCAA national champion.

=== Professional ===
In 2015, Norwood finished 3rd at the US Outdoor Championships, to secure a spot in the United States team at the World Championships in the 400 meters. He made it to the semi-final and did not advance to the final in the 400 m, and won a gold medal as part of the 4 × 400 m relay squad.

During the 2016 indoor season, Norwood made his second USA team by winning the 400m at the US Indoor Championships. At the World Indoor Championships, he was disqualified for stepping on the inside of his lane during the first round of the 400 meters, and won gold in the 4 × 400 m relay.

Norwood won a silver medal as part of the 4 × 400 relay team at the 2018 World Indoor Championships.

In 2019, Norwood finished 4th at the US Outdoor Championships in a new personal best of 44.40. He competed at the 2019 World Championships, where he went out in the semi-finals of the 400 metres and won gold in the 4 × 400 m relay.

In 2021, Norwood ran a new 200 m personal best of 20.30s in Baton Rouge. He finished 5th at the US Olympic trials and qualified for the 4x400 relay teams at the Tokyo Olympics. Norwood won a bronze medal as part of the Mixed 4 × 400 m relay team and a gold medal as part of the Men's 4 × 400 m relay team.

Norwood finished 4th in the 400 m at the 2022 US Outdoor Championships in a new personal best of 44.35s. He competed at the 2022 World Championships Where he won bronze as part of the Mixed 4 × 400 m relay team and gold as part of the Men's 4 × 400 relay team.

In 2023, Norwood finished 2nd at the US Outdoor Championships, qualifying for the 2023 World Athletics Championships, where he finished 4th in the 400 m, having run a new personal best of 44.26s in the semi-final, he won a gold medal as part of the Men's 4 × 400 m relay team.

At the 2024 US Olympic Trials, Norwood finished 4th in the 400 m with a time of 44.47s. He ran a personal best of 44.10s over 400m at the London Athletics Meet. Norwood competed at the 2024 Paris Olympics, he won a silver medal as part of the Mixed 4 × 400 m relay team, having broken the world record in the heats and a gold medal as part of the Men's 4 × 400 relay team.

=== USA National Track and field Championships ===
Year	Competition	Venue	Position	Event	Notes
2023	USA Outdoor Track and Field Championships	Eugene, Oregon	2nd	400 metres	44.39
2016	USA Indoor Track and Field Championships	Portland, Oregon	1st	400 metres	45.80
2015	USA Outdoor Track and Field Championships	Eugene, Oregon	3rd	400 metres	44.80

== International competitions ==
Year	Competition	Venue	Position	Event	Notes
2014	NACAC U23 Championships	Kamloops, Canada	1st	4 × 400 m relay	3:04.34
2014	NACAC U23 Championships	Kamloops, Canada	3rd	400 m	45.56
2015	World Championships	Beijing, China	1st (h)	4 × 400 m relay	2:58.13
2016	Indoor World Championships	Portland, USA	1st	4 × 400 m relay	3:02.45
2016	Indoor World Championships	Portland, USA	DQ	400 m	-
2018	Indoor World Championships	Birmingham, England	2nd	4 × 400 m relay	3:01.97
2019	World Relays	Yokohama, Japan	1st	4 × 200 m relay	1:20.12
2019	World Championships	Doha, Qatar	4th (sf)	400 m	45.02
2019	World Championships	Doha, Qatar	1st (h)	4 × 400 m relay	2:59.89
2021	Olympic Games	Tokyo, Japan	3rd	Mixed 4 × 400 m relay	3:10.22
2021	Olympic Games	Tokyo, Japan	1st (h)	4 × 400 m relay	2:57.77
2022	World Championships	Eugene, USA	3rd	Mixed 4 × 400 m relay	3:10.16
2022	World Championships	Eugene, USA	1st (h)	4 × 400 m relay	2:58.96
2023	World Championships	Budapest, Hungary	4th	400 m	44.39
2023	World Championships	Budapest, Hungary	1st	4 × 400 m relay	2:57.31
2024	Olympic Games	Paris, France	2nd	Mixed 4 × 400 m relay	3:07.74
2024	Olympic Games	Paris, France	1st	4 × 400 m relay	2:54.43 OR

=== Circuit performances ===
Grand Slam Track results
Slam	Race group	Event	Pl.	Time	Prize money
2025 Kingston Slam	Long sprints	400 m	3rd	44.70	US$25,000
2025 Kingston Slam	Long sprints	200 m	4th	20.92	US$25,000
