= Mercy Chebet =

Kenyan sprinter

Mercy Cheney
Personal information
- Nationality: Kenyan
- Born: 2 January 2002 (age 24)
- Height: 1.61 m (5 ft 3 in)

Sport
- Sport: Athletics
- Event: Sprint
Medal record
Women's athletics
Representing Kenya
World Relays
Bronze medal – third place	2025 Guangzhou	4 × 400 m mixed

Mercy Chebet (born 2 January 2002) is a Kenyan sprinter. In 2024, she became Kenyan national champion in the 400 metres at the Kenyan Athletics Championships and competed at the 2024 Olympic Games. She was a bronze medal winner with the Kenyan mixed 4 × 400 metres relay team at the 2025 World Athletics Relays.

== Biography ==
She was selected for the 2024 World Athletics Relays in Nassau, Bahamas after finishing second in the 400 metres behind Mary Moraa in the Kenyan trials in April 2024. She won the 400 metres at the Kenyan Athletics Championships in May 2024.

In June 2024, she finished fourth with the Kenyan mixed 4 × 400 metres relay team in the final of the 2024 African Championships in Douala, Cameroon. That month, she was a member of the Kenyan mixed 4 × 400 metres team alongside Zablon Ekwam, Mary Moraa, and Kelvin Sane Tauta which ran 3:11.88 to set a new African record at the Kenyan Olympic Trials in Nairobi. She subsequently competed for Kenya at the 2024 Olympic Games in Paris, France in the mixed 4 × 400 metres relay, the first time Kenya had qualified a team for the event. However, the team did not qualify for the final, finishing seventh in the same heat as the United States team which broke the world record.

She won a bronze medal with the Kenyan mixed 4 × 400 metres relay team at the 2025 World Athletics Relays in Guangzhou, China, also securing qualification to the upcoming World Championships. The bronze medal marked Kenya's first in the mixed relay since claiming the same at the 2019 World Relays in Yokohama. In June 2025, she ran 51.80 seconds be runner-up at the women's 400 m at the Kenyan Athletics Championships behind Mercy Oketch. She was named in the Kenyan team for the mixed 4 × 400 metres at the 2025 World Athletics Championships.

Competing at the 2026 World Athletics Relays in Botswana, she was part of the Kenya mixed 4 x 400 metres relay team which set an African record of 3:09.87 on the opening day. In July, she was a semi-finalist in the 400 metres at the 2026 Commonwealth Games in Glasgow, Scotland. She also competed in the mixed 4 × 400 m relay at the Games.
