= Jenoah McKiver =

American sprinter (born 1998)

Personal information
- Born: 3 April 2002 (age 24)

Sport
- Country: United States
- Sport: Athletics
- Event: Sprint

Achievements and titles
- Personal best: 400m: 44.74 s (2022)
Medal record
Men's athletics
Representing the United States
World Championships
Gold medal – first place	2025 Tokyo	4 × 400 m mixed
Silver medal – second place	2025 Tokyo	4 x 400 m relay
World Relays
Gold medal – first place	2026 Gaborone	Mixed 4 × 400 m relay

Jenoah McKiver (born 3 April 2002) is an American sprinter who predominantly competes over 400 metres but who also set a world best time for men's indoor 600 yards in January 2025.

== Early and personal life ==
He is from High Point, North Carolina, where he attended T. Wingate Andrews High School. At high school he played as a dual-threat quarterback, as well as a basketball player, and he was also a keen golfer. Initially, it was his brother Jevon who excelled in track and field, until he was also encouraged to train in sprinting at high school initially to improve his quarterback play. He went on to compete in athletics at the collegiate level for the University of Iowa and then the University of Florida.

== Career ==
He set a school record in April 2022 competing for Iowa when he ran 44.74 seconds for the 400 metres, in Tucson, Arizona. However, his season ended early with a hamstring injury. It proved to be a recurrent issue for McKiver, who suffered a string of hamstring tears over the following few years which impacted his ability to compete, with at one point the count was at eight separate hamstring tears in one three-year period.

In February 2023, McKiver ran the 600 meters in 1:14.27, in Geneva, Ohio, a time which would have placed him third on the world indoor all-time best for the distance, but he was disqualified for a lane infringement. In January 2025, McKiver set a world best time for men's indoor 600 yards, with 1:05.75 at the Corky Classic in Lubbock. He qualified for the final of the 400 metres at the 2025 USA Indoor Track and Field Championships in Eugene, Oregon, before placing fifth in the final in 45.16 seconds.

He represented the United States at the 2025 NACAC Championships in The Barbados, placing fourth in the final of the 400 metres. He was selected for the American team for the 2025 World Athletics Championships in Tokyo, Japan, as part of the relay pool. He ran on the opening day in the mixed 4 × 400 metres relay, helping the USA qualify for the final, and also ran in the final as the team won the gold medal. He later won a silver medal in the men's 4 x 400 metres relay. Initially, his American men's team had not qualified for the final but the handover between his teammates Bryce Deadmon and Demarius Smith was adjudged to have been impacted by a runner from Zambia, and they were put forward for a run-off with the same team in the same lanes against Kenya, who had also been impacted. He ran as they won the run-off on the morning of the final, with a time of 2:58.48, before a different quartet ran the final later that day, placing second behind Botswana.

On 1 February 2026, he ran a personal best to finish second behind Cooper Lutkenhaus over 600 metres at the Millrose Games in 1:14.77. He was named in the United States team for the 2026 World Athletics Relays in Gaborone, Botswana and ran in the final as part of the mixed 4 x 400 metres relay team which won the gold medal.
