= Athletics at the 2024 Summer Olympics – Mixed 4 × 400 metres relay =

Mixed 4 × 400 metres relay at the Games of the XXXIII Olympiad
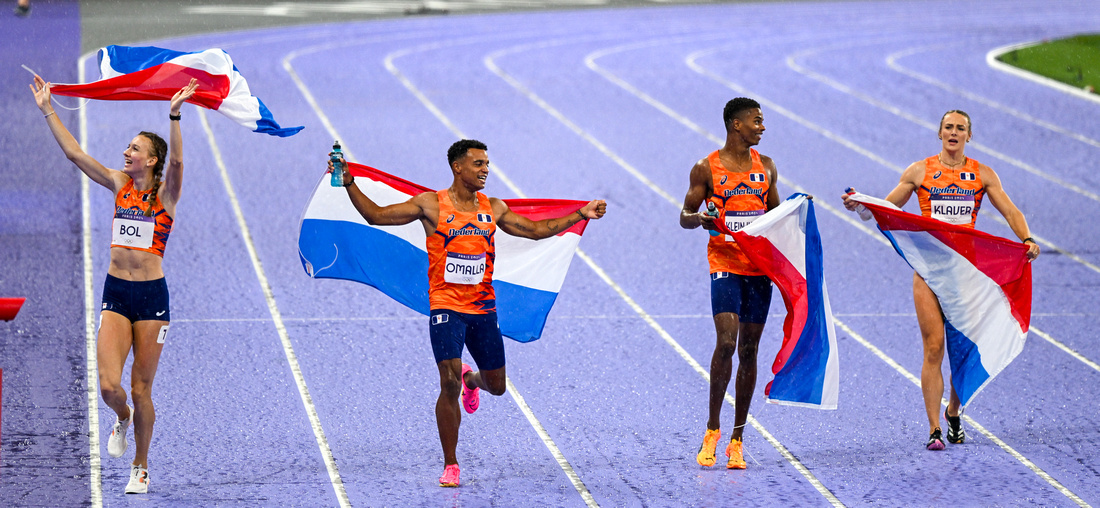
- Femke Bol, Eugene Omalla, Isaya Klein Ikkink, and Lieke Klaver of the Netherlands after winning the final
- Venue: Stade de France; Saint-Denis, France
- Dates: 2 August 2024 (round 1); 3 August 2024 (final)
- Teams: 16
- Winning time: 3:07.43 min AR

Medalists
1st place, gold medalist(s)		Eugene Omalla, Lieke Klaver, Isaya Klein Ikkink, Femke Bol, (Note: This athlete only competed in the final, not in round 1.) Cathelijn Peeters (Note: This athlete competed in round 1, but was replaced in the final.)	Netherlands
2nd place, silver medalist(s)		Vernon Norwood, Shamier Little, Bryce Deadmon, Kaylyn Brown	United States
3rd place, bronze medalist(s)		Samuel Reardon, Laviai Nielsen, Alex Haydock-Wilson, Amber Anning, Nicole Yeargin	Great Britain

The mixed 4 × 400 metres relay at the 2024 Summer Olympics was held over two rounds at the Stade de France in Saint-Denis, France, on 2 and 3 August 2024. This was the second time that this mixed-sex relay event was contested at the Summer Olympics. National teams could qualify for the event through the 2024 World Athletics Relays or the World Athletics top list.

Sixteen teams competed in round 1, where the team of the United States set a world record of 3:07.41 minutes, and where the teams of France, Great Britain, Belgium, Jamaica, Nigeria, and Switzerland all broke national records. Eight teams advanced to the final, that was won by the team of the Netherlands in a European record of 3:07.43 min, ahead of the team of the United States in second place in 3:07.74 min and the team of Great Britain in third place in a national record of 3:08.01 min. The Belgian team set another national record and the French team was disqualified in the final.

Femke Bol's anchor leg in the final was called "one of Paris' signature moments"; the Dutch runner started in fourth position and overtook three runners to win the race with a split time of 48.00 s. The next year, Dutch runner Eugene Omalla auctioned his gold medal.

== Background ==
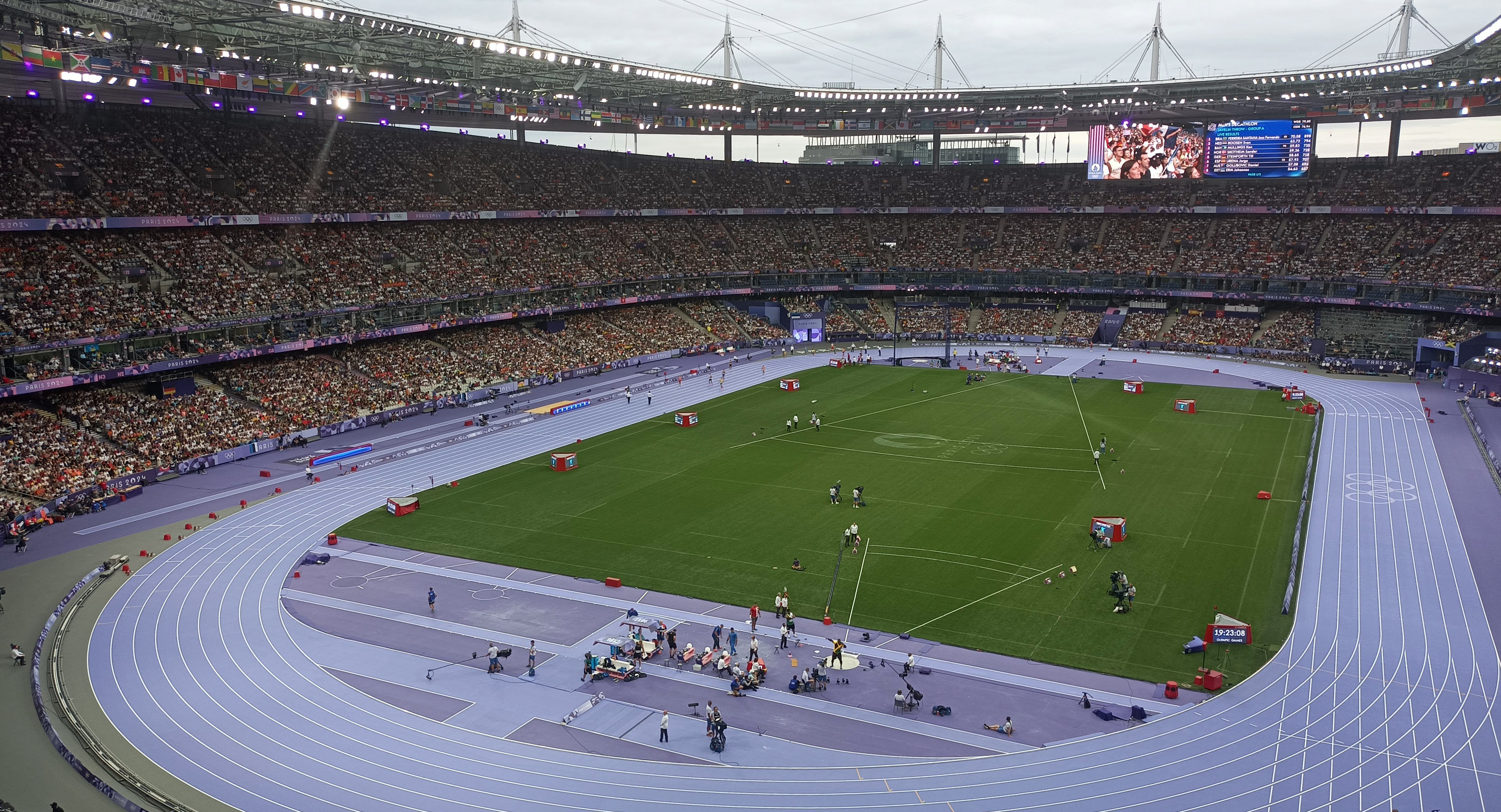
The Stade de France on 3 August 2024

In the mixed 4 × 400 metres relay, each mixed-sex team consists of four athletes, two male and two female, who successively run one lap on a 400-metre track and pass on a baton between them. The running order man–woman–man–woman has been mandatory at championships since 2022.

This relay was added to the Olympic athletics programme in 2021, so it had been contested at the Summer Olympics once before. At the 2024 Summer Olympics, the event was held at the Stade de France in Saint-Denis, France, which is part of the Paris metropolitan area.

Before these Olympics, the world record was 3:08.80 min, set by the team of the United States at the 2023 World Athletics Championships on 19 August 2023; the Olympic record was 3:09.87 min, set by the team of Poland, the defending champions, at the 2020 Summer Olympics on 31 July 2021; and the world leading time so far in the 2024 season was 3:09.92 min, run by the team of Ireland at the 2024 European Athletics Championships on 7 June 2024.

Global records before the 2024 Summer Olympics
Record	Nation (competitors)	Time	Location	Date
World record	United States (Justin Robinson, Rosey Effiong, Matthew Boling, Alexis Holmes)	3:08.80	Budapest, Hungary	19 August 2023
Olympic record	Poland (Karol Zalewski, Natalia Kaczamarek, Justyna Święty-Ersetic, Kajetan Duszyński)	3:09.87	Tokyo, Japan	31 July 2021
World leading	Ireland (Christopher O'Donnell, Rhasidat Adeleke, Thomas Barr, Sharlene Mawdsley)	3:09.92	Rome, Italy	7 June 2024

Area records before the 2024 Summer Olympics
Record	Nation (competitors)	Time	Location	Date
African record	Kenya (Zablon Ekwam, Mary Moraa, Kelvin Tauta, Mercy Chebet)	3:11.88	Nairobi, Kenya	15 June 2024
Asian record	Bahrain (Musa Isah, Aminat Yusuf Jamal, Salwa Eid Naser, Abbas Abubakar Abbas)	3:11.82	Doha, Qatar	29 September 2019
European record	Poland (Karol Zalewski, Natalia Kaczamarek, Justyna Święty-Ersetic, Kajetan Duszyński)	3:09.87	Tokyo, Japan	31 July 2021
North, Central American and Caribbean record	United States (Justin Robinson, Rosey Effiong, Matthew Boling, Alexis Holmes)	3:08.80 WR	Budapest, Hungary	19 August 2023
Oceanian record	Australia (Bendere Oboya, Anneliese Rubie-Renshaw, Tyler Gunn, Alex Beck)	3:17.00	Gold Coast, Australia	12 June 2021
South American record	Colombia (Jhon Perlaza, Lina Licona, Nicolás Salinas, Evelis Aguilar)	3:14.48	Mexico City, Mexico	7 April 2024

== Qualification ==
Sixteen national teams could qualify for this event. Fourteen teams qualified from the two rounds of the mixed 4 × 400 metres relay – eight teams in round 1 and six teams in a repechage round – at the 2024 World Athletics Relays in Nassau, The Bahamas, on 4 and 5 May 2024. The remaining two qualification spots went to the highest-ranked unqualified teams on the World Athletics top list, which is based on the fastest performances recorded between 31 December 2022 and 30 June 2024.

Qualified teams
Qualification event		Teams	Nations
2024 World Athletics Relays – Mixed 4 × 400 metres relay	Round 1	8	United States; Netherlands; Ireland; Belgium; Poland; Nigeria; Dominican Republic; France
2024 World Athletics Relays – Mixed 4 × 400 metres relay	Repechage round	6	Bahamas; Great Britain; Germany; Switzerland; Jamaica; Ukraine
World Athletics top list		2	Italy; Kenya

== Results ==
=== Round 1 ===
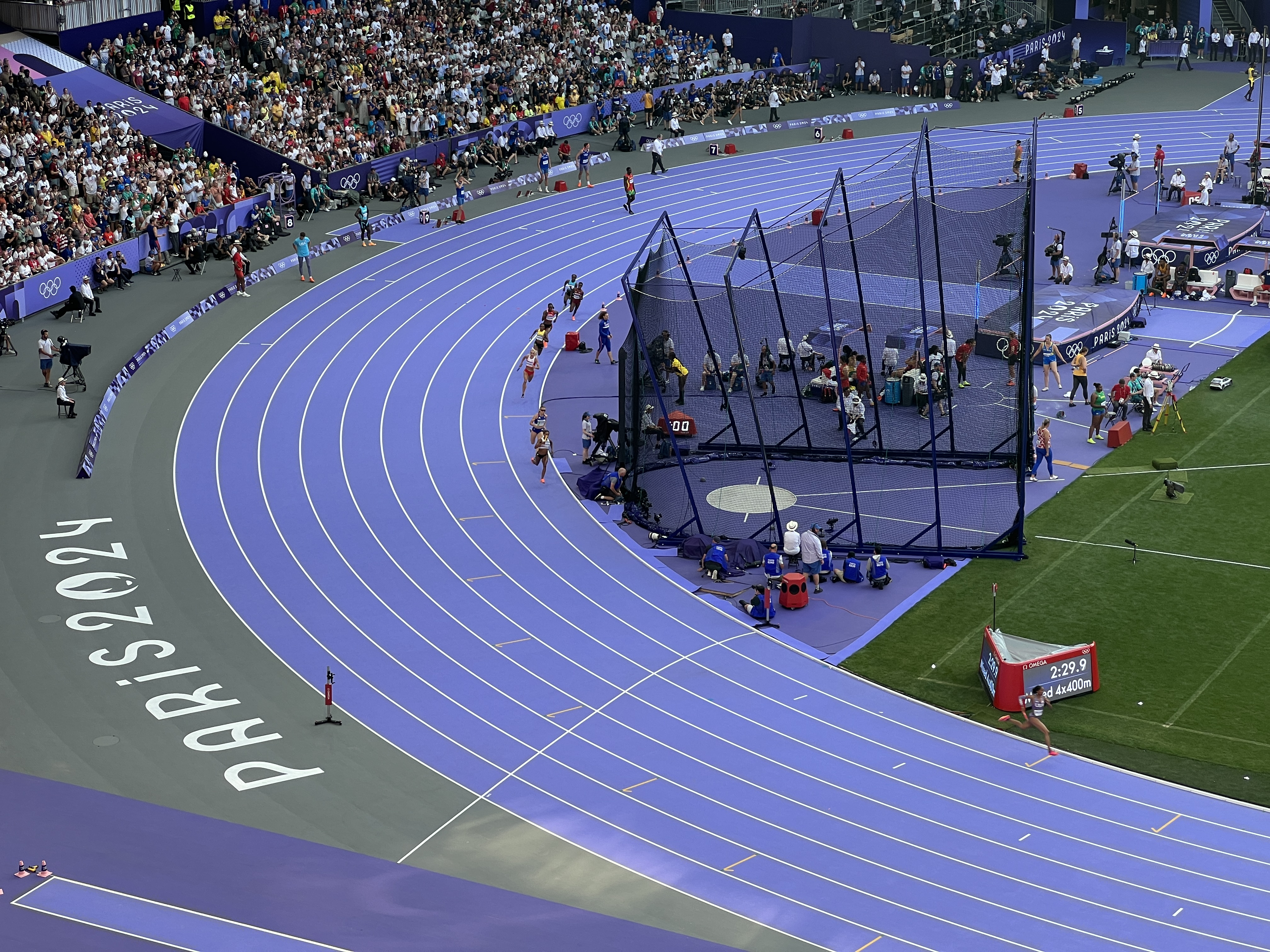
Kaylyn Brown (bottom right) of the United States, metres ahead of the other anchors, before breaking the world record

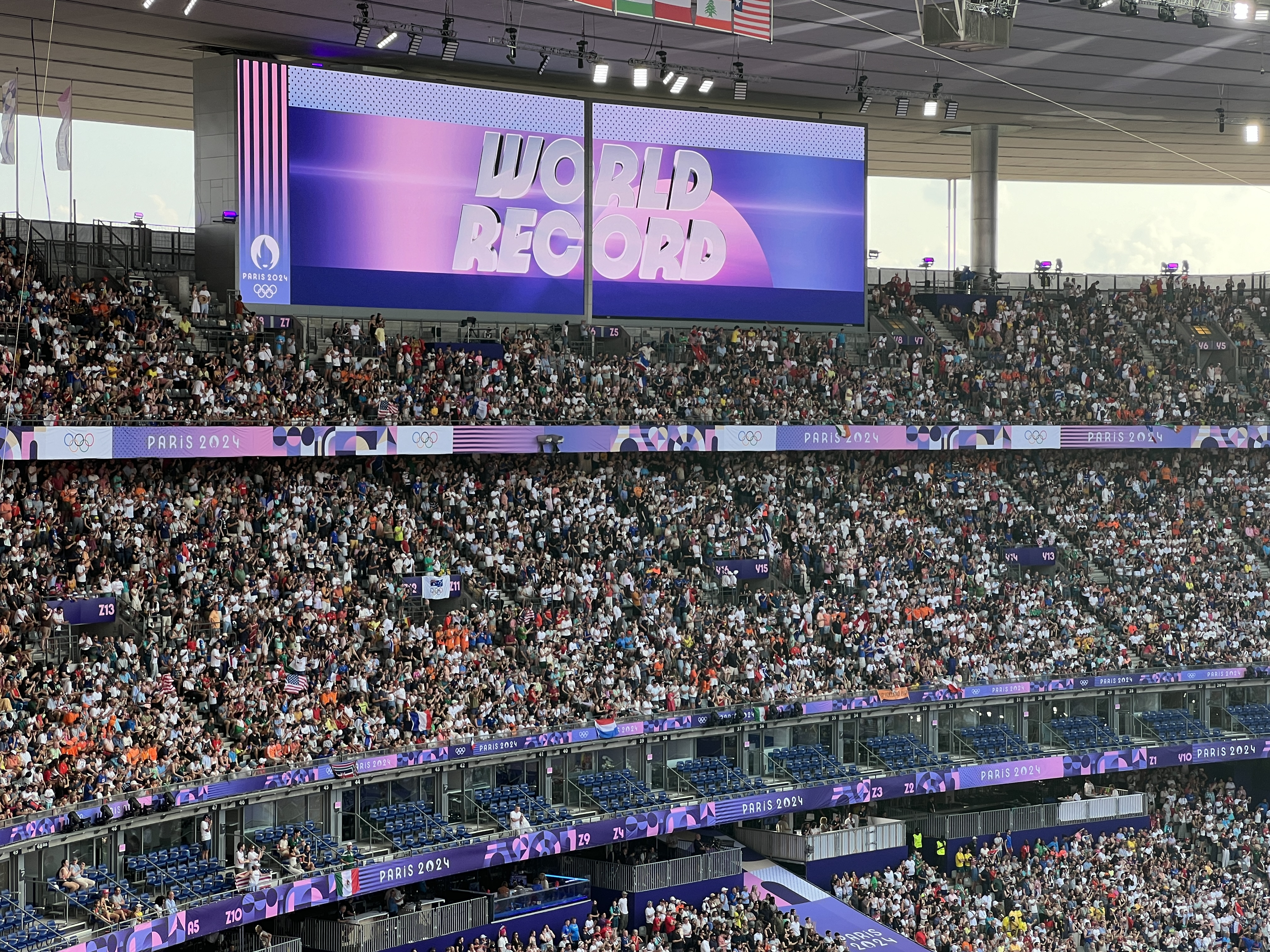
Announcement of the world record on a screen in the stadium

Sixteen teams competed in the first round on 2 August in the evening, starting at 19:10 (UTC+2). Eight teams, the first three in each of the two heats (Q) and the next two fastest overall (q), qualified for the final.

In the first heat, the team of the United States led from the first to the last leg and finished in a new world record (WR) of 3.07.41 min. Consisting of Vernon Norwood, Shamier Little, Bryce Deadmon, and Kaylyn Brown, the American team was more than a second faster than the previous world record and more than three seconds faster than the other teams. The French team set a national record (NR) of 3:10.60 min, the Belgian team set a national record of 3:10.74 min, and the Jamaican team set a national record of 3:11.06 min. The Swiss team also set a national record of 3:12.77 min, but they did not advance to the final.

Jason Henderson of Athletics Weekly called it "a runaway relay victory" for the team of the United States. Marcus Thompson II of The New York Times wrote about the American runners: "Judging by the aggression of their legs, the quartet had every intention of going for the world-record mark. It was top of mind heading into the race." In an interview after the race, Deadmon said: "I ain't think we (were) gon' do that today." and "I was running down the back stretch on the last curve, and I was like, ... 'Damn! It's kinda loud in here.' So that was definitely a great experience."

In the second heat, the team of Great Britain set a national record of 3:10.61 min. The Nigerian team also set a national record of 3:11.99 min, but they did not advance to the final.

Results of round 1
Rank	Heat	Lane	Nation	Competitors	Time	Notes
1	1	6	United States	Vernon Norwood, Shamier Little, Bryce Deadmon, Kaylyn Brown	3:07.41	Q, WR, OR
2	1	8	France	Muhammad Kounta, Louise Maraval, Téo Andant, Amandine Brossier	3:10.60	Q, NR
3	2	4	Great Britain	Samuel Reardon, Laviai Nielsen, Alex Haydock-Wilson, Nicole Yeargin	3:10.61	Q, NR
4	1	7	Belgium	Jonathan Sacoor, Helena Ponette, Kévin Borlée, Naomi Van den Broeck	3:10.74	Q, NR
5	2	6	Netherlands	Eugene Omalla, Lieke Klaver, Isaya Klein Ikkink, Cathelijn Peeters	3:10.81	Q
6	1	2	Jamaica	Reheem Hayles, Junelle Bromfield, Zandrion Barnes, Stephenie Ann McPherson	3:11.06	q, NR
7	1	5	Poland	Maksymilian Szwed, Marika Popowicz-Drapała, Karol Zalewski, Justyna Święty-Ersetic	3:11.43	q, SB
8	2	3	Italy	Luca Sito, Anna Polinari, Edoardo Scotti, Alice Mangione	3:11.59	Q
9	2	5	Nigeria	Samuel Ogazi, Ella Onojuvwevwo, Ifeanyi Emmanuel Ojeli, Patience Okon George	3:11.99	NR
10	2	7	Ireland	Christopher O'Donnell, Sophie Becker, Thomas Barr, Sharlene Mawdsley	3:12.67	
11	1	9	Switzerland	Charles Devantay, Giulia Senn, Lionel Spitz, Yasmin Giger	3:12.77	NR
12	1	3	Kenya	David Kapirante, Veronica Mutua, Boniface Mweresa, Mercy Chebet	3:13.13	
13	1	4	Bahamas	Wendell Miller, Javonya Valcourt, Alonzo Russell, Quincy Penn	3:14.58	
14	2	2	Ukraine	Oleksandr Pohorilko, Tetyana Melnyk, Danylo Danylenko, Maryana Shostak	3:15.51	
15	2	9	Germany	Jean Paul Bredau, Alica Schmidt, Manuel Sanders, Eileen Demes	3:15.63	
16	2	8	Dominican Republic	Erick Joel Sánchez, Milagros Durán, Robert King, Anabel Medina	3:18.39	

=== Final ===
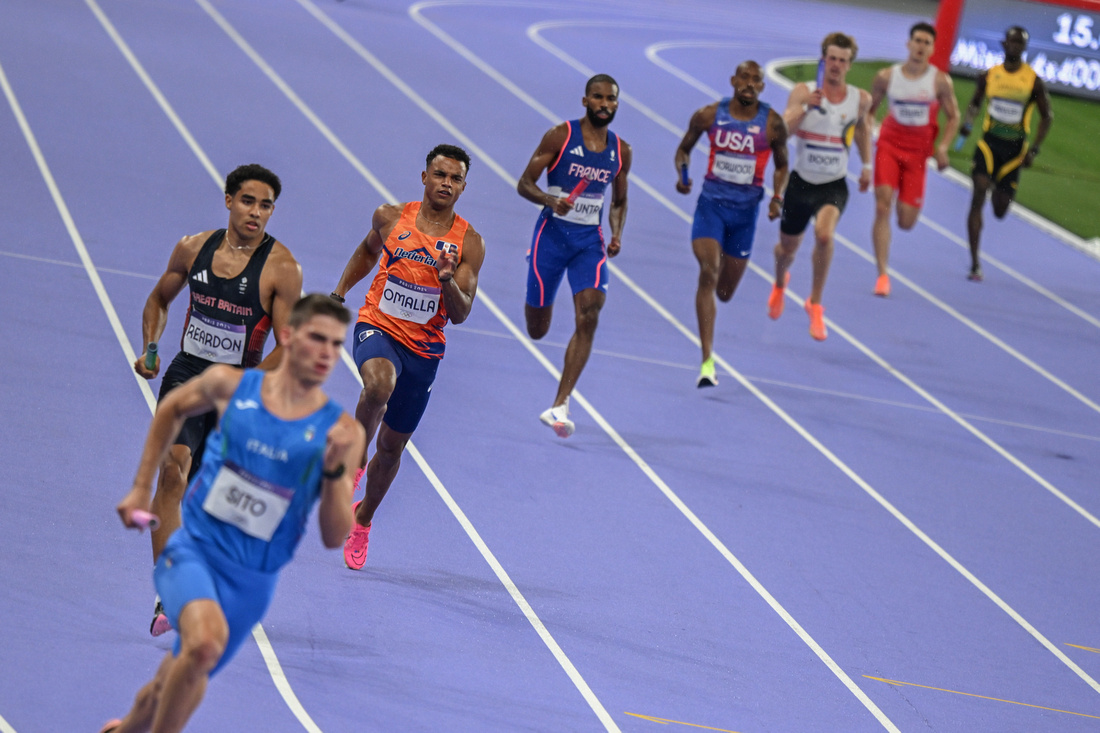
All eight first-leg runners of the final

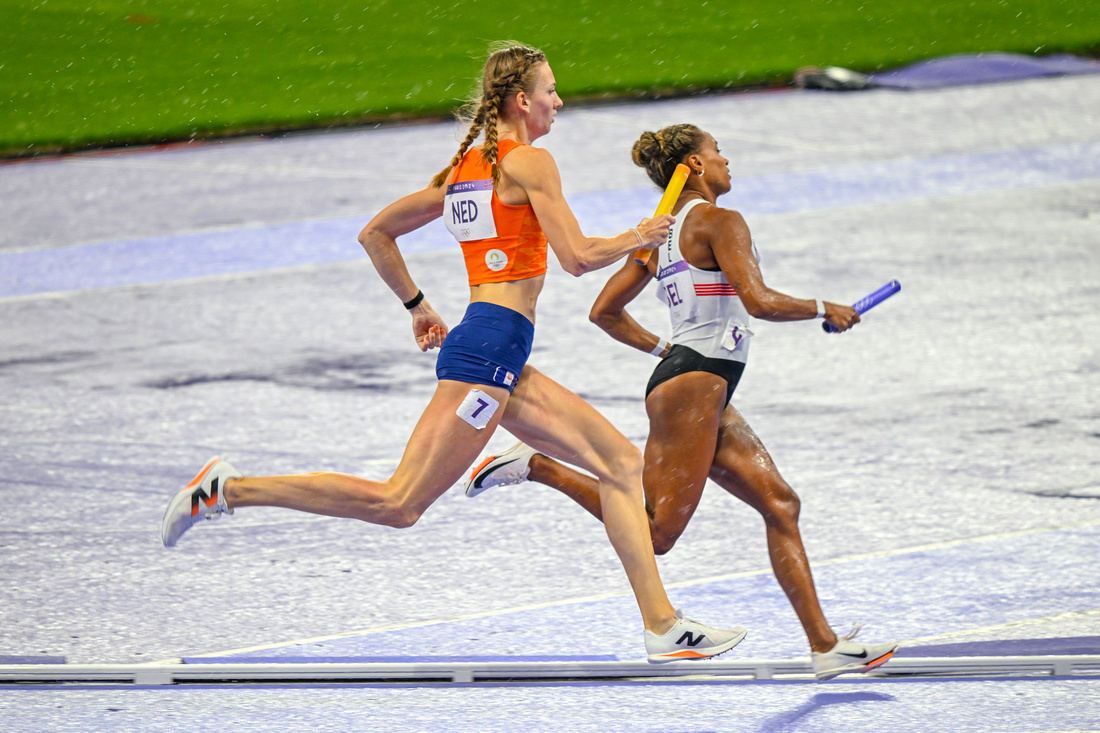
Femke Bol (left) of the Netherlands in the process of passing Naomi Van den Broeck (right) of Belgium

Eight teams competed in the final on 3 August in the evening, starting at 20:55 (UTC+2). During the race it was lightly raining.

In the opening leg, Alexander Doom of Belgium was the first to hand over the baton, followed by Vernon Norwood of the United States and Samuel Reardon of Great Britain; Eugene Omalla of the Netherlands handed over in sixth position. In the second leg, Shamier Little of the United States moved into the leading position and handed over ahead of Helena Ponette of Belgium, Lieke Klaver of the Netherlands, and Laviai Nielsen of Great Britain. In the third leg, Jonathan Sacoor of Belgium brought his team back in the lead at the handover, and he was followed by Bryce Deadmon of the United States, Alex Haydock-Wilson of Great Britain, and Isaya Klein Ikkink of the Netherlands. In the anchor leg, Femke Bol of the Netherlands first caught up with Naomi Van den Broeck of Belgium between 200 and 300 metres, and then Bol also passed Amber Anning of Great Britain and Kaylyn Brown of the United States in the last 100 metres.

The team of the Netherlands won the race in a European record (AR) of 3:07.43 min, 0.02 s slower than the world record set the day before, followed by the team of the United States in second place in 3:07.74 min and the team of Great Britain in third place in a national record (NR) of 3:08.01 min. Outside the medals, the Belgian team set a national record (NR) of 3:09.36 min. The French team was disqualified (DQ) for obstructing other runners (TR17.1.2) at the third handover. The fastest male runner was Sacoor who had a split time of 44.01 s, and the fastest female runner was Bol with a 48.00 s split.

Mark Puleo of The New York Times reported that the "Netherlands' legendary 400-meter star is making a surprise appearance in the mixed 4 × 400 m", seeing the 400 metres hurdles as Bol's main event. Lori Ewing of Reuters wrote that "Femke Bol ran a stunning last lap to lead the Netherlands to victory". Jason Henderson of Athletics Weekly said about Bol: "The tall Dutch athlete was a scintillating sight as she took the Netherlands from a fighting fourth and up into first place." Rohan Nadkarni of NBC News called Bol's anchor leg overcoming three runners to win gold "one of Paris' signature moments". Dutch newspaper Algemeen Dagblad called the Dutch victory "Sensational!" in its headline.

In an interview after the race, Bol said: "I just went for it. We just wanted a medal this time, we didn't think it would be gold, just a medal. Well, we got gold and are the Olympic champions. It is absolutely crazy for a small country like ours." Anning said about the final stage of the race, referring to Brown and Bol: "I saw my teammate in front of me so I wanted to keep pushing but I knew Femke was coming. I just didn't want to let off, they had done the job but I just had to finish it off. I wanted a medal and I was just doing my part in getting there. I've got a great team and all I could do was finish what they had started." Norwood said about his relay team: "We did exactly what we needed to do. We are still world record holders and I can't be more proud of us."

Results of final
Rank	Lane	Nation	Competitors	Time	Notes
1st place, gold medalist(s)	7	Netherlands	Eugene Omalla, Lieke Klaver, Isaya Klein Ikkink, Femke Bol	3:07.43	AR
2nd place, silver medalist(s)	5	United States	Vernon Norwood, Shamier Little, Bryce Deadmon, Kaylyn Brown	3:07.74	
3rd place, bronze medalist(s)	8	Great Britain	Samuel Reardon, Laviai Nielsen, Alex Haydock-Wilson, Amber Anning	3:08.01	NR
4	4	Belgium	Alexander Doom, Helena Ponette, Jonathan Sacoor, Naomi Van den Broeck	3:09.36	NR
5	2	Jamaica	Reheem Hayles, Junelle Bromfield, Zandrion Barnes, Stephenie Ann McPherson	3:11.67	
6	9	Italy	Luca Sito, Giancarla Trevisan, Edoardo Scotti, Alice Mangione	3:11.84	
7	3	Poland	Maksymilian Szwed, Justyna Święty-Ersetic, Karol Zalewski, Alicja Wrona-Kutrzepa	3:12.39	
	6	France	Muhammad Abdallah Kounta, Louise Maraval, Fabrisio Saïdy, Amandine Brossier	DQ	TR17.1.2

== Aftermath ==
In May 2025, Omalla sold his gold medal from the event for $57,000 through Heritage Auctions. When he was criticized, Omalla released a statement on social media: "I understand that my decision to auction the medal may have come across to some as an act of greed or lack of respect. That's why I want to make this clear: it's not about financial problems, and it's definitely not meant to enrich myself." Omalla, who had lived in Uganda and had represented this African nation before representing the Netherlands, spoke about the intended purpose of the proceeds: "A large part of the proceeds will go to my parents' charity, Child's Destiny of Hope (CDhope), an organization that works for children in Uganda through education, health care, and life-improving support. The rest will be used to support my family – people who sacrificed everything so that I could pursue my dreams."
