= Shana Kaye Anderson =

Jamaican sprinter (born 2003)

Personal information
- Nationality: Jamaican
- Born: 31 May 2003 (age 23)
- Home town: Kingston, Jamaica

Sport
- Sport: Athletics
- Event: 400 metres
- College team: UTech
- Coached by: Stephen Francis; Paul Francis

Achievements and titles
- Personal best: 400m: 51.40 (2026)
Medal record
Women's athletics
Representing Jamaica
World Relays
Silver medal – second place	2026 Gaborone	Mixed 4 × 400 m relay
Commonwealth Games
Gold medal – first place	2026 Glasgow	Mixed 4 × 400 m relay
Pan American Junior Games
Bronze medal – third place	2025 Asunción	400 m
NACAC U23 Championships
Silver medal – second place	2023 San Jose	4 × 100 m
Silver medal – second place	2023 San Jose	4 × 400 m
Bronze medal – third place	2023 San Jose	400 m

Shana Kaye Anderson (born 31 May 2003) is a Jamaican sprinter. She represented Jamaica in the inaugural mixed 4 × 400 m relay at the 2026 World Indoor Championships.

== Biography ==
Educated at Bustamante High School in Jamaica,

== Career ==
Anderson was selected to compete for Jamaica at the 2023 NACAC Under 23 Championships in San Jose, Costa Rica. She won three medals at the Championships; a bronze in the individual 400 metres, and two silver medals in the women's 4 × 100 m relay and women's 4 × 400 m relay.

== 2025 ==
A member of the MVP Track Club, in July 2025, Anderson was part of a victorious Jamaican mixed 4 x 400 metres relay team at the inaugural Barbados Grand Prix at St. Michael, Barbados. Anderson won the bronze medal over 400 metres at the 2025 Pan American Junior Games in Asunción, Paraguay in August 2025.

== 2026 ==
Anderson was selected to represent Jamaica at the 2026 World Athletics Indoor Championships in Toruń, Poland. Anderson ran as the Jamaican team initially finished third in the inaugural mixed 4 × 400 m relay at a World Athletics Indoor Championships, running alongside Leah Anderson, Kimar Farquharson and Delano Kennedy, finishing in a time of 3:17.13. However, the team were later disqualified from a messy race which included an incident at a baton exchange which caused Dutch and American runners to fall, and Sara Reifenrath of the United States run her leg of the race with only one shoe, and Jamaica disqualified for exchanging positions before a takeover.

Anderson was named in the Jamaica squad for the 2026 World Athletics Relays in Gaborone, Botswana, successfully winning the heat on the opening day in the mixed relay alongside Deandre Watkin, Antonio Watson, and Rushell Clayton. The following day, she ran the second leg as the quartet won the silver medal in a new national record time of 3:08.24. In July, she was a semi-finalist in the 400 metres at the 2026 Commonwealth Games in Glasgow, Scotland. Later at the Games, she won a gold medal in the mixed 4 × 400 m relay.
