= Emma Cannan =

Canadian athlete

Personal information
- Nationality: Canadian
- Born: 22 July 2003 (age 22)
- Education: Simon Fraser University

Sport
- Sport: Athletics
- Event: Sprint

Achievements and titles
- Personal best(s): 60m: 7.33s (2026); 100m: 11.54s (2024); 200m: 23.12s (2026); 400m: 52.48s (2026)

Emma Cannan (born 22 July 2003) is a Canadian sprinter. She won the 200 metres at the 2026 NCAA Division II Indoor Championships and was selected for the 400 metres at the 2026 World Athletics Indoor Championships.

== Biography ==
From Kelowna, British Columbia, Cannan is a member of Okanagan Athletics Club where she is coached by Pat Sima-Ledding. She attended Kelowna Secondary School. She started out playing ice hockey before focusing on athletics. In 2019, she won four titles and set a pair of provincial records at the B.C. High School Track and Field Association Championships in Kelowna as a 15 year-old.

After moving on to Simon Fraser University, Cannan broke the Great Northwest Athletic Conference (GNAC) indoor record in the 400 metres, with a time of 53.56 seconds in January 2026. In doing so, she surpassed the previous record time of 53.82 seconds, set by her former teammate Marie-Éloïse Leclair.

Cannan won the women's 200 metres title in 23.21 seconds at the 2026 NCAA Division II Indoor Track and Field Championships, in March 2026. On her way to the title, Cannan ran a personal best of 23.12 seconds to finish as the top qualifier for the final, a time which moved her to second on the Canadian all-time indoor list. In doing so, she became the first GNAC sprinter, including both women and men, to win an NCAA track title. She also competed in the 60 metres, placing fourth in 7.36 seconds, and in the 4 x 400 metres relay, in which she rsn the fastest leg in the entire field.

Later that month, Cannan was subsequently selected to compete for Canada in the 400 metres at the 2026 World Athletics Indoor Championships in Toruń, Poland, running 52.57 seconds. She was selected as part of the Canadian team for the 2026 World Athletics Relays and ran in the mixed 4 x 400 metres relay.
