= Deandre Watkin =

Jamaican athlete (born 2002)

Personal information
- Nationality: Jamaican
- Born: 9 December 2002 (age 23)

Sport
- Sport: Athletics
- Event: Sprint

Achievements and titles
- Personal bests: 400m: 44.48 (Kingston, 2024)
Medal record
Men's athletics
Representing Jamaica
World Relays
| Silver medal – second place | 2026 Gaborone | Mixed 4 × 400 m relay |

Deandre Watkin (born 9 December 2002) is a Jamaican sprinter. In 2024, he became Jamaican national champion over 400 metres.

== Early life ==
He attended Jamaica College. In March 2020, he ran 10.61 to win the U20 boys' 100m final of the Jamaica's Carifta Games Trials at the National Stadium.

== Career ==
He had a personal best for the 400 metres of 45.26 from 2023, which he lowered to 45.19 in the heats of the Jamaican Athletics Championships in June 2024.

== 2024 ==
On 28 June 2024, he set a personal best time of 44.48 seconds to win the Jamaican national championship in Kingston, Jamaica. He competed at the 2024 Summer Olympics over 400 metres in August 2024.

== 2025 ==
He reached the final of the 400 metres at the Jamaican Athletics Championships in June 2025. He was named in the Jamaican squad for the 2025 NACAC Championships in Nassau, The Bahamas.

== 2026 ==
Watkin was named in the Jamaica squad for the 2026 World Athletics Relays in Gaborone, Botswana. successfully winning the heat on the opening day in the mixed relay alongside Shana Kaye Anderson, Antonio Watson, and Rushell Clayton. The following day, the quartet won the silver medal in a new national record time of 3:08.24.

== Statistics ==
Grand Slam Track results
| Slam | Race group | Event | Pl. | Time | Prize money |
|---|---|---|---|---|---|
| 2025 Kingston Slam | Long sprints | 400 m | 7th | 45.45 | US$20,000 |
| 2025 Kingston Slam | Long sprints | 200 m | 3rd | 20.91 | US$20,000 |
