= Samuel Reardon =

British athlete (born 2003)

Personal information
- Nationality: Great Britain
- Born: 30 October 2003 (age 22)

Sport
- Sport: Athletics
- Event(s): 400m, 800m

Achievements and titles
- Personal best(s): 400m: 44.60 (Madrid, 2025); 800m: 1:45.95 (Espoo, 2023)
Medal record
Men's athletics
Representing Great Britain
Olympic Games
Bronze medal – third place	2024 Paris	4×400 m
Bronze medal – third place	2024 Paris	4×400 m mixed
European U20 Championships
Gold medal – first place	2021 Tallinn	4x400m relay

Samuel Reardon (born 30 October 2003) is a British athlete who competes over 400m and 800m. In 2023, he became the British indoor champion over 400 metres. He won bronze medals at the 2024 Summer Olympics in the mixed 4 x 400 metres and men's 4 x 400 metres relay.

== Early life ==
Reardon is from Beckenham in London. He attended Langley Park School for Boys.

== Career ==
Reardon is a member of Blackheath & Bromley Athletic Club. He won gold at the Under-17 men’s 800m race at the national indoor championships in February 2020.

=== 2021 ===
Reardon won gold as part of the 4 × 400 m relay team at the 2021 European Athletics U20 Championships in Tallinn.

=== 2022 ===
Reardon ran as part of the British 4 × 400 m relay team at the 2022 World Athletics Indoor Championships. Aged 18, he was the youngest member of the squad.

Reardon finished fifth in the 800m race at the 800m at the 2022 World Athletics U20 Championships. He was also part of the British 4 × 400 m relay team that finished fourth in the Mixed 4 × 400 metres relay at the championships.

=== 2023 ===
In February 2023 Reardon ran 46.96 over 400 metres to win his first national championship gold medal at the 2023 British Indoor Athletics Championships. He was subsequently selected for the Great Britain squad for the European Indoor Championships held in Istanbul from March 2, 2023. He was selected for the England team to take place at the Loughborough International in May 2023.

He was selected as part of the Great Britain team for the 2023 European Athletics U23 Championships held from in July 2023 in Espoo, Finland. He ran a new personal best time of 1:45.95 to reach the 800m final. He also made his debut at a Diamond League event, in London in July 2023.

=== 2024 ===
In January 2024, he pulled a hamstring which kept him out of competitive action for a number of months and could not take part in the British Olympic trials. In July 2024, he ran 45.99 seconds for the 400 metres at the Morton Games in Dublin. He lowered his personal best for the 400 metres to 44.70 seconds at the London Athletics Meet on 20 July 2024. Reardon was called-up as a late replacement for the Great Britain 4x400 metres relay squad for the 2024 Summer Olympics following the withdrawal of Charlie Carvell due to a hamstring injury. He was part of the mixed 4x400 team which won a bronze medal in a new national record of 3:08.01. He also competed in the men's 4x400m relay at the Games, winning a second bronze medal.

=== 2025 ===
He ran his second-fastest ever time for the 400 metres when he ran 44.99 seconds to finish second at the Golden Spike Ostrava on 24 June.

He was selected for the 400 metres at the 2025 European Athletics Team Championships, where he ran a personal best 44.60 seconds to win the First Division race. The time also set a new championship record of both the European Team Championships and the European Cup which preceded the event prior to 2009. The following day, he also competed in the mixed 4 x 400 metres, in which Britain finished in third place, in the same time as the second-placed Italian team.

He was selected as part of the British team for the 2025 World Athletics Championships in Tokyo, Japan, running 44.70 seconds to qualify for the 400m semi-finals without reaching the final.

=== 2026 ===
In June, he placed fifth in the final of the 400 metres at the 2026 British Championships, running 45.58 seconds.
