= Ansa Babu =

Indian athlete (born 1988)

Ansa Babu (born 9 April 1998) is an Indian athlete from Kerala who specialises in 400 metre run. She qualified to represent India in women's 4x400 metre event at the 2026 Asian Games at Nagoya, Aichi Prefecture, Japan from 19 September to 4 October 2026.

== Career ==
In April 2025, Babu won a silver medal clocking 54.29 seconds at the 28th National Federation Senior Athletics Championships 2025 at Maharaja's College Grounds, Kochi finishing second to Vithya Ramraj. In May 2026, he won a silver with a time of 53.07 sec at the 29th National Senior Athletics Federation Competition at Birsa Munda Foot Ball Stadium, Morabadi, Ranchi.

She represented India in the 4 × 400 m relay at the 2026 Commonwealth Games in Glasgow.

In April 2026, she underwent DNA test as part of the Project GENESIS (Genomics for Elite Sports Integrated System) which integrates genomics into high performance sport to improve athlete performance, health and recovery through ethical andevidence-based scientific practices.
