= Ilana Hanssens =

Belgian hurdler (born 2002)

Personal information
- Born: 27 January 2002 (age 24)

Sport
- Sport: Athletics
- Events: Hurdles, Sprint

Achievements and titles
- Personal bests: 400 m: 52.86 (Gent, 2026); 400 mH: 56.50 (Bochum, 2025)
Medal record
Women's athletics
Representing Belgium
World Indoor Championships
| Gold medal – first place | 2026 Toruń | 4 × 400 m mixed |

Ilana Hanssens (born 27 January 2002) is a Belgian sprinter and 400 metres hurdler. She has represented Belgium at international competitions, and won the gold medal at the 2026 World Athletics Indoor Championships in the mixed 4 × 400 metres relay.

== Biography ==
Hanssens is a member of ASV Oudenaarde (ASVO) and studies Educational Science at Gent University. She was the Belgian under-23 champion in the 400 metres hurdles in September 2024.

Hanssens placed second to Paulien Couckuyt in the 400 metres at the 2025 Belgian Indoor Athletics Championships. She competed for Belgium at the 2025 World Athletics Relays in China, running in both the Women's 4 × 400 metres relay and the Mixed 4 × 400 metres relay at the championships in May 2025. Later that month, Hanssens won the IFAM Ghent in the 400 metres hurdles and also ran a new personal best in the 400 metres at IFAM Brussels. That summer, she represented Belgium at the 2025 Summer World University Games in Bochum, Germany, where she finished sixth in the 400 m hurdles final in a time of 56.95 seconds, having run a personal best of 56.50 seconds in the preliminary heats.

Hanssens set a new 400 metres personal best of 52.86 seconds in Gent in January 2026. She placed second behind Helena Ponette in the 400 metres at the 2026 Belgian Indoor Athletics Championships. In March 2026, she was selected for the relays at the 2026 World Athletics Indoor Championships in Poland, winning the gold medal in the mixed 4 × 400 metres relay on 21 March running alongside Jonathan Sacoor, Julien Watrin and Helena Ponette. Their time of 3:15.60 was the fastest short track performance recorded for the event. In May, she ran at the 2026 World Athletics Relays in the mixed 4 × 400 metres relay in Gaborone, Botswana. In August, she competed at the 2026 European Athletics Championships in Birmingham, England, in the women's 4 x 400 metres relay.

== International competitions ==
| Year | Competition | Venue | Position | Event | Notes |
Representing Belgium
| 2026 | World Indoor Championships | Toruń, Poland | 1st | 4 × 400 m relay mixed | 3:15.60 |
| 2026 | European Championships | Birmingham, United Kingdom | 6th | 4 × 400 m relay | 3:25.19 |
