= Jevon O'Bryant =

American sprinter (born 2001)

Personal information
- Born: September 5, 2001 (age 24)

Sport
- Sport: Athletics
- Event: Sprint

Achievements and titles
- Personal best(s): 200m: 20.98 (Lubbock, 2022); 400m: 45.37 (Gainesville, 2024); Indoor; 200m: 21.33 (6, 2022); 300m: 33.08 (College Station, 2025); 400m: 45.80 (College Station, 2025)
Medal record
Men's athletics
Representing United States
World Indoor Championships
| Gold medal – first place | 2026 Toruń | 4 × 400 m relay |

Jevon O'Bryant (born 5 September 2001) is an American sprinter who primarily competes over 400 metres.

== Biography ==
From Texas, O'Bryant attended Fort Bend Elkins High School, after which he attended Barton County Community College, followed by the University of New Mexico.

Competing in May 2022 as a sophomore for New Mexico, O'Bryant won the 400 m title in 45.98 seconds, as well as anchoring the victorious 4x400 m relay in 3:09.68, at the Mountain West Conference Championships. O'Bryant also finished fifth in the 200 m in 21.41 seconds.

Competing for Texas A&M University, he was part of the 4 x 400 metres relay team which finished second, and ran season-best time of 3:03.62 to move to tenth on the all-time school list, at the Southeastern Conference Indoor Championships in Arkansas. In March, the team finished third in the relay at the 2024 NCAA Indoor Championships.

O'Bryant was a member of the Texas Aggies team which ran a time of 2:58.37 minutes in the men’s 4x400m relay to win the 2024 NCAA Outdoor Athletics Championships in Eugene, Oregon in June 2024, running alongside Kimar Farquharson, Auhmad Robinson and Cutler Zamzow. He was a semi-finalist running 46.39 seconds at the US Olympic Trials later that month.

O'Bryant competed in the 400 metres at the 2025 USA Indoor Track and Field Championships in New York, running 46.05 seconds in the final. He was selected for the United States relay pool for the 2025 World Athletics Indoor Championships in Nanjing, China. He competed at the 2025 World Athletics Relays in China in the Men's 4 × 400 metres relay in May 2025.

O'Bryant was finalist in the 400 metres at the 2026 USA Indoor Track and Field Championships in New York, placing fifth overall and running 46.41 seconds in the final. He was selected for the United States relay teams at the 2026 World Athletics Indoor Championships in Toruń, Poland. Competing in the mixed 4 x 400 metres relay, he completed a baton exchange with Sara Reifenrath only for her to fall following a racing incident for which the Jamaican team were later disqualified. Although she got up to continue, the American team did not feature again at the front of the race, placing fifth.
