= Mercy Oketch =

Kenyan sprinter (born 2002)

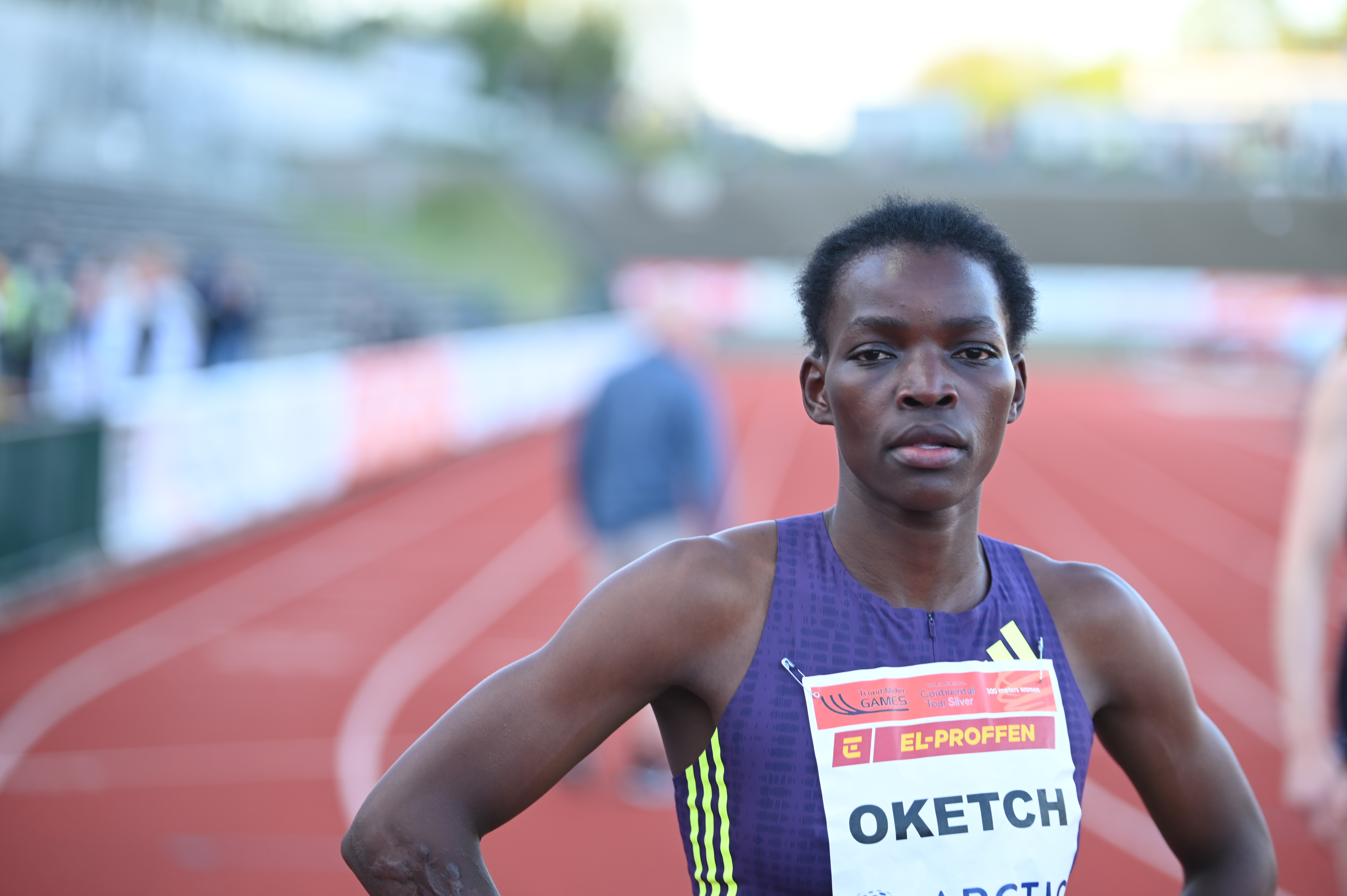
- Oketch in 2026

Personal information
- Full name: Mercy Adongo Oketch
- Born: 30 July 2002 (age 24)

Sport
- Sport: Athletics
- Event: Sprint

Achievements and titles
- Personal bests: 400 m: 50.14 (Nairobi, 2025) NR; Indoor; 400 m: 51.53 (Metz, 2026) NR
Medal record
Women's athletics
Representing Kenya
World Relays
Bronze medal – third place	2025 Guangzhou	4 × 400 m mixed

Mercy Adongo Oketch (born 30 July 2002) is a Kenyan sprinter. She is the Kenyan national record holder in the 400 metres both outdoors and indoors.

She was provisionally suspended by the Kenyan Anti-Doping Agency on 2 November 2026, for testing positive for the banned substances trimetazidine and furosemide.

== Early life ==
Born in Kabobo village, Nyatike sub-county in Migori County, she was the third last in a family of seven siblings (three boys and four girls) with no one else in her family having a background in athletics. She attended Masara Primary School and then Radienya Primary School. She focused on football for a couple of years playing as a striker before switching back to athletics. She ran in the same school athletics relay team as Mary Moraa. She later transferred to transfer to Mogonga Girls School in Kisii. She has a younger sister who plays football with Bunyore Starlets.

== Career ==
Oketch narrowly missed selection for the Kenya team after a photo-finish loss to Nelly Chepchirchir during the trials for the 2019 African U18 and U20 Championships in Athletics. However, that year she won the 400 metres at the national championships in Mombasa and was selected for the East African Secondary School Games (FEASSSA) in Arusha, Tanzania, where she won a silver in the 4 × 400 m relay.

By 2023, she was coached by Josephine Nyarunda and ran for Kenya at the 2023 World Athletics Championships in the Mixed 4 × 400 metres relay in Budapest, running a 52.22 seconds split.

Oketch competed at the 2024 African Military Games in Abuja, Nigeria, where she won a silver medal in the 400 metres. Shortly afterwards she ran a personal best 51.80 seconds at the Nakuru AK meet, breaking the 52-second barrier for the first time. She lowered her personal best for the 400 metres to 51.64 in Nairobi in April 2025. She won a bronze medal with the Kenyan mixed 4 × 400 metres relay team at the 2025 World Athletics Relays in Guangzhou, China, also securing qualification to the upcoming World Championships. She ran a new personal best and Kenyan national record of 50.14 seconds to win the Kip Keino Classic in Nairobi on 31 May 2025.

In June 2025, she ran 50.32 seconds to win the women's 400m at the Kenyan National Championships. Subsequently, she was named in the Kenyan team for the individual 400 metres at the 2025 World Athletics Championships. She ran on the opening day in the mixed 4 × 400 metres relay but the Kenyan team was disqualified for a lane infringement. She was also a semi-finalist at the Championships in the women's 400 metres.

Oketch set a Kenyan indoor national record for the 400 metres running 52.98 to win at Internationales Leichtathletik Hallen Meeting in Germany on 24 January 2026. On 6 February 2026, Oketch ran a new indoors 400 metres personal best of 52.25 on the World Athletics Indoor Tour in Madrid. She lowered the mark again shortly afterwards to 51.53 seconds 51.53 seconds in Metz, France. Oketch was named in the Kenyan team for the 2026 World Athletics Indoor Championships in Toruń, Poland, where she reached the final of the 400 metres, becoming the first Kenyan woman to achieve that feat over 400 m at the World Indoors, and placed fifth overall.

In April 2026, she won in a season's best of 50.17 seconds at the Kip Keino Classic ahead of American Paris Peoples. Later that month, she ran 35.77 seconds to win the 300 metres at the Simbine Classic in South Africa. Competing at the 2026 World Athletics Relays in Botswana, she was part of the Kenya mixed 4 x 400 metres relay team which set an African record of 3:09.87 on the opening day in May 2026. The following month, she won the 400 m title at the Kenyan Championships in 51.14. In July, she was a semi-finalist in the 400 metres at the 2026 Commonwealth Games in Glasgow, Scotland. Oketch also competed in the mixed 4 × 400 m relay at the Games. In September, she competed over 400 m at the inaugural World Ultimate Championship in Budapest.

== Personal life ==
In 2023, she was recruited by the Kenya Defence Forces (KDF) and she attended Recruits Training School in Eldoret as part of the Kenyan Air Force.
