= Time in Botswana =

- Time zone: Central Africa Time
- Initials: CAT
- UTC offset: UTC+02:00
- Adopted: 1903

Daylight saving time
- DST not observed

tz database
- Africa/Gaborone

Time in Botswana is given by a single time zone, officially denoted as Central Africa Time (CAT; UTC+02:00). Botswana has never observed daylight saving time. Botswana, as the Bechuanaland Protectorate, has observed CAT since 1903. In 1885 it used the South African Standard Time (SAST; UTC+01:30) as British Bechuanaland. Before adopting SAST and CAT, it observed local mean time (LMT; UTC+01:43).

== Daylight saving time ==
Daylight saving time in Botswana was adopted in 1943 and consequently disposed of in 1944.

== IANA time zone database ==
In the IANA time zone database, Botswana is given one zone in the file zone.tab – Africa/Gaborone. "BW" refers to the country's ISO 3166-1 alpha-2 country code. Data for Botswana directly from zone.tab of the IANA time zone database; columns marked with * are the columns from zone.tab itself:

c.c.*	coordinates*	TZ*	Comments	UTC offset	CAT
BW	−2439+02555	Africa/Gaborone		+02:00	+02:00

== See also ==
- List of time zones by country
- List of UTC time offsets
