= Antonio Watson =

Jamaican sprinter (born 2001)

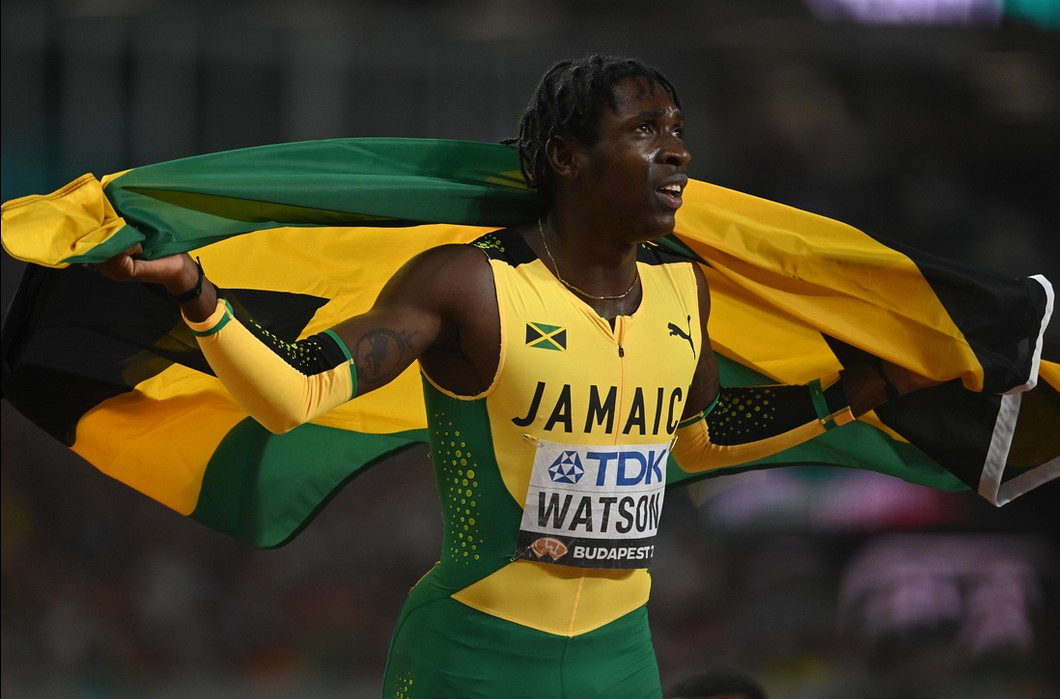
- Watson at the 2023 World Athletics Championships

Personal information
- Born: 11 September 2001 (age 25)
- Home town: Trelawny, Jamaica
- Height: 173 cm (5 ft 8 in)

Sport
- Country: Jamaica
- Sport: Track and field
- Event: Sprinting
- Club: Racers Track Club
- Turned pro: 2021
- Coached by: Glen Mills

Achievements and titles
- Personal bests: 400 m: 44.13; 200 m: 20.49
Medal record
Men's athletics
Representing Jamaica
World Championships
Gold medal – first place	2023 Budapest	400 m
World Relays
Silver medal – second place	2026 Gaborone	Mixed 4 × 400 m relay
Summer Youth Olympics
Silver medal – second place	2018 Buenos Aires	200 m
World U18 Championships
Gold medal – first place	2017 Nairobi	400 m
Silver medal – second place	2017 Nairobi	Mixed 4 × 400 m
NACAC U23 Championships
Gold medal – first place	2021 San José	4 × 100 m
Bronze medal – third place	2021 San José	200 m
Carifta Games Junior (U20)
Gold medal – first place	2019 George Town	4 × 400 meters relay
Silver medal – second place	2019 George Town	200 meters
Carifta Games Youth (U18)
Gold medal – first place	2017 Willemstad	400 meters

Antonio Watson (born 11 September 2001) is a Jamaican sprinter who specializes in the 400 metres event.

== Biography ==
Antonio hails from Duncan's in Trelawny, Jamaica. After careful planning by his primary school coach and others, he went to Petersfield High School in Westmoreland, where he excelled despite few resources. Subsequent to graduation, he skipped college in favor of the professional league.

== Career ==
He won the gold medal in the boys' 400 metres event at the 2017 World Youth Championships in Athletics held in Nairobi, Kenya.

At the ISSA Boys and Girls Championships in 2018, he won the 200m (20.50) and 400m (47.08) double, and the 4 × 400 m relay. Also in 2018, he won the silver medal in the boys' 200 metres event at the Summer Youth Olympics held in Buenos Aires, Argentina.

He won the 200 m bronze medal and the gold in the 4 × 100 relay in the 2021 NACAC U23 Championships. The same year 2021, he mined a gold medal in the 200 metres in 20.74 at the 2021 ISSA Boys and Girls Championships in Kingston ahead of Bryan Levell.

== 2023 ==
Watson won gold in 44.22 in the 400 m at the 2023 World Championships in Budapest, Hungary. The first medal in 40 years in this event for Jamaica at the World Championships.

== 2024 ==
For 2024, lingering injuries resulted in a stagnant season and prevented him from competing in the 2024 Summer Olympics in Paris.

== 2025 ==
At the 2025 World Athletics Championships in Tokyo, Japan, the defending champion was eliminated in heats of the 400 metres to every one's surprise.

== 2026 ==
In March 2026, he competed at Velocity Fest 18 in Kingston where he clocked 20.59 in the 200 metres. And then in April, he again raced the 200 metres in 20.82 at the Velocity Fest 19.

Watson won a silver medal in the mixed 4 × 400 metres relay at the 2026 World Athletics Relays Championships in Gaborone, Botswana.
