= Lina Nielsen =

British sprinter (born 1996)

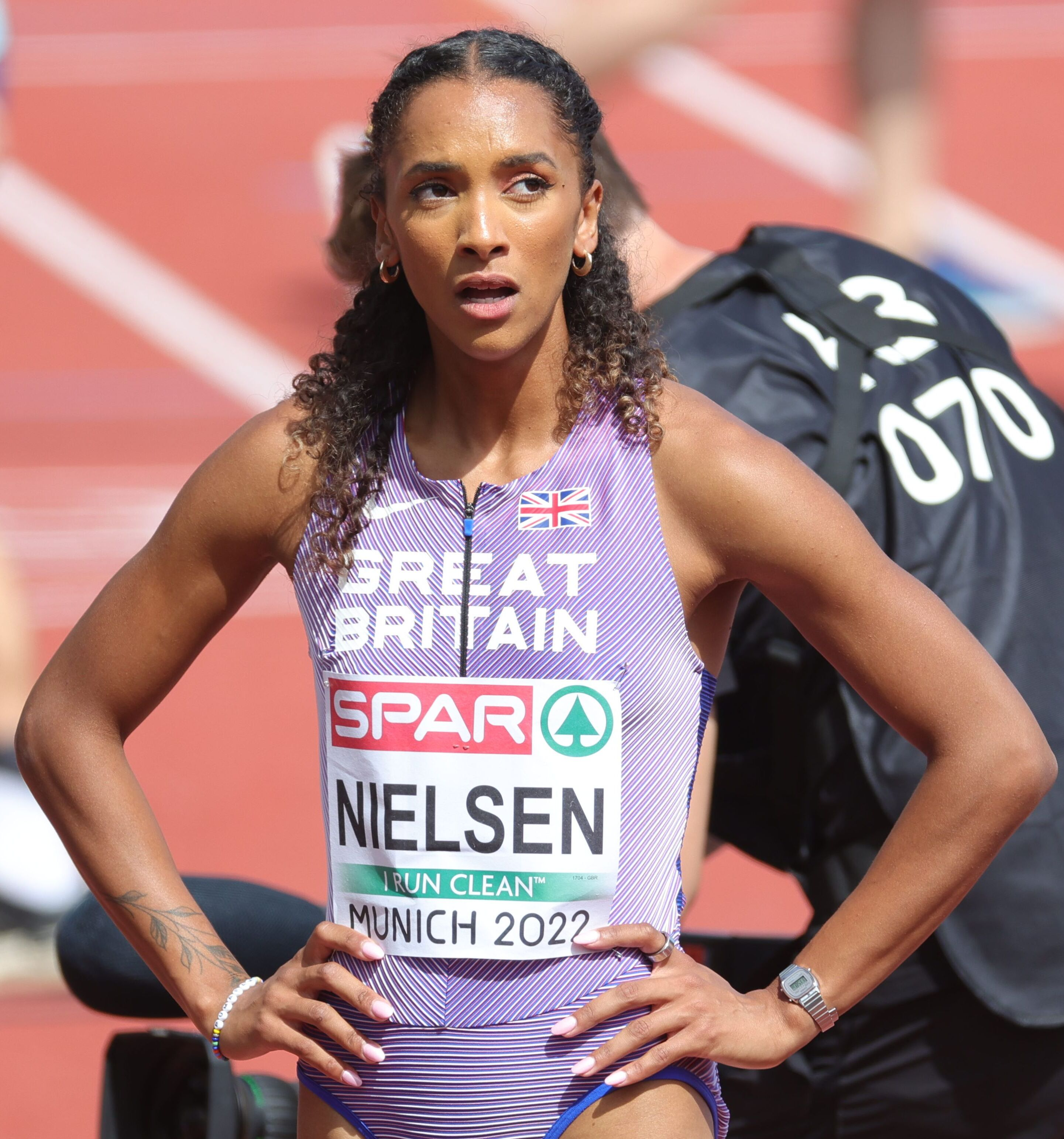
- Nielsen in 2022

Personal information
- Born: 13 March 1996 (age 30) London, England
- Home town: London, England
- Height: 1.73 m (5 ft 8 in)
- Weight: 60 kg (132 lb)

Sport
- Sport: Track and field
- Event: 400 metres hurdles
- Club: Shaftesbury Barnet Harriers

Achievements and titles
- Personal bests: 200 m: 23.11 (Gainesville, FL 2022); 400 m: 50.61 (London, United Kingdom 2026); 400 m hs: 54.43 (Rome, 2024)
Medal record
Women's athletics
Representing Great Britain
Olympic Games
Bronze medal – third place	2024 Paris	4 × 400 m relay
World Relays
Bronze medal – third place	2026 Gaborone	4 × 400 m mixed relay
World Indoor Championships
Bronze medal – third place	2024 Glasgow	4 × 400 m relay
European Championships
Silver medal – second place	2026 Birmingham	4 × 400 m relay
European Indoor Championships
Silver medal – second place	2025 Apeldoorn	4 × 400 m relay
Bronze medal – third place	2025 Apeldoorn	4 × 400 m mixed relay
European Junior Championships
Gold medal – first place	2015 Eskilstuna	4 × 400 m relay
Representing England
Commonwealth Games
Silver medal – second place	2026 Glasgow	4 × 400 m mixed relay

Lina Nielsen (born 13 March 1996) is a British national record-holding sprinter and hurdler.

In August 2022, she revealed she had been diagnosed with multiple sclerosis nine years earlier.

== Early life ==
Nielsen grew up in Leytonstone, East London with her twin sister Laviai. Her mother is Egyptian-Sudanese and her father is Danish. In 2017, she graduated from Queen Mary University of London with a degree in chemistry.

== Athletics career ==
Nielsen won the 400 m hurdles at the 2021 European Athletics Team Championships with 55.59. Nielsen has a twin sister, Laviai Nielsen, who is also an international athlete over 400 m.

At the 2024 World Athletics Indoor Championships in Glasgow, Nielsen won a bronze medal as part of the 4 × 400 metres relay team, which also included her sister Laviai Nielsen.

After becoming the British 400 metres hurdles champion at the 2024 British Athletics Championships, Nielsen was subsequently named in the Great Britain team for the 2024 Summer Olympics where she went out in the semi-finals after hitting a hurdle and falling to the track. Recovering from that setback, Nielsen ran for Great Britain in the heat of the women's 4 × 400 metre relay, qualifying for the final in second place. Although, like her three fellow heat runners, she did not run the final, the third-place finish for the Great Britain team in that final confirmed that Nielsen had won her first Olympic medal, a bronze.

On 15 February 2025, she broke the British women's indoor 300 m record in a time of 36.53 seconds in Birmingham. At the 2025 European Athletics Indoor Championships in Apeldoorn, she was part of the British 4 × 400 metres relay team which won a silver medal. Nielsen retained her 400 metres hurdles title by winning the 2025 UK Athletics Championships.

=== Athletics achievements ===
==== International competitions ====
Representing Great Britain & England
Year	Competition	Venue	Position	Event	Time
2015	European Junior Championships	Eskilstuna, Sweden	8th	400 m	54.72
2015	European Junior Championships	Eskilstuna, Sweden	1st	4 × 400 m relay	3:34.36
2017	European Indoor Championships	Belgrade, Serbia	—	400 m sh	DNS
2017	European U23 Championships	Bydgoszcz, Poland	4th	4 × 400 m relay	3:30.74
2021	European Team Championships, Super League	Chorzów, Poland	1st	400 m hurdles	3:29.27
2021	European Team Championships, Super League	Chorzów, Poland	2nd	4 × 400 m relay	3:27.16
2022	World Championships	Eugene, United States	33rd (h)	400 m hurdles	57.42
2022	Commonwealth Games	Birmingham, United Kingdom	11th (h)	400 m hurdles	58.95
2022	European Championships	Munich, Germany	21st (sf)	400 m hurdles	57.19
2024	World Indoor Championships	Glasgow, United Kingdom	3rd	4 × 400 m relay	3:26.36
2024	European Championships	Rome, Italy	7th	400 m hurdles	55.65
2024	Olympic Games	Paris, France	24th (sf)	400 m hurdles	1:31.22
2024	Olympic Games	Paris, France	3rd	4 × 400 m relay	3:24.72
2025	European Indoor Championships	Apeldoorn, Netherlands	2nd	4 × 400 m relay	3:24.89
2025	European Indoor Championships	Apeldoorn, Netherlands	3rd	Mixed 4 × 400 m relay	3:16.49
2025	World Championships	Tokyo, Japan	29th (h)	400 m hurdles	55.82
2026	Commonwealth Games	Glasgow, United Kingdom	4th	400 m hurdles	54.69
2026	Commonwealth Games	Glasgow, United Kingdom	2nd	Mixed 4 × 400 m relay	3:11.58
2026	European Championships	Birmingham, United Kingdom	6th	400 m hurdles	54.35
2026	European Championships	Birmingham, United Kingdom	2nd	4 × 400 m relay	3:21.68
2026	World Ultimate Championship	Budapest, Hungary	14th (h)	400 m hurdles	55.14

==== National championships and competitions ====
Year	Competition	Venue	Position	Event	Time
2014	England Championships, U20 events	Bedford	—	400 m	58.58
2015	England Indoor Championships, U20 events	Sheffield	2nd	400 m	54.48
2015	England Championships, U20 events	Bedford	3rd	400 m	53.95
2016	England Championships, U23 events	Bedford	1st	400 m	52.97
2016	British Championships	Birmingham	—	400 m	54.28
2017	British Indoor Championships	Sheffield	3rd	400 m	52.89
2017	England Championships, U23 events	Bedford	2nd	400 m hurdles	58.87
2017	British Championships	Birmingham	—	400 m	53.72
2018	England Championships, U23 events	Bedford	1st	400 m hurdles	57.93
2018	British Championships	Birmingham	5th	400 m hurdles	57.98
2019	British Indoor Championships	Birmingham	—	400 m	54.57
2019	British Championships	Birmingham	7th	400 m hurdles	59.28
2020	British Championships	Manchester	2nd	400 m hurdles	56.99
2021	British Championships	Manchester	6th	400 m hurdles	56.68
2022	British Indoor Championships	Birmingham	—	400 m	53.09
2023	British Championships	Manchester	2nd	400 m hurdles	55.62
2024	British Indoor Championships	Birmingham	2nd	400 m	51.95
2024	British Championships	Manchester	1st	400 m hurdles	54.81
2025	British Indoor Championships	Birmingham	2nd	400 m	51.77
2025	British Championships	Birmingham	1st	400 m hurdles	55.39

==== Circuit performances ====
Grand Slam Track results
Slam	Race group	Event	Pl.	Time	Prize money
2025 Philadelphia Slam	Long hurdles	400 m hurdles	6th	57.14	US$30,000
2025 Philadelphia Slam	Long hurdles	400 m	1st	52.60	US$30,000

== Personal life ==
Nielsen is a yoga teacher, having undertaken her teaching training in Rishikesh in the summer of 2019. She is now one of the yoga instructors on the fitness app Fiit.

In August 2022, Nielsen revealed she had been diagnosed with multiple sclerosis, at the age of 17. She chose to keep her diagnosis private for nine years, but following a relapse two days prior to her World Athletics Championships heats in Oregon she decided to go public with her story.
