= Taiya Shelby =

American sprinter

Personal information
- Born: 16 August 2000 (age 25)

Sport
- Sport: Athletics
- Event: Sprint

Achievements and titles
- Personal bests: 400m: 51.43 (Baton Rouge, 2023); 800m: 2:01.06 (Philadelphia, 2026)

Taiya Shelby (born 16 August 2000) is an American sprinter and middle-distance runner.

== Biography ==
Shelby attended Park Hill High School in Kansas City, Missouri. She was a Missouri Class 4 champion in the 800 metres and 4 x 400 metres relay. She signed a letter of intent to attend Vanderbilt University in 2018, where she studied for a double major in economics and medicine, health and society.

With a run of 51.84 seconds she qualified for the 2021 NCAA Outdoor Championships in the 400 metres after becoming the second Vanderbilt Commodore in school history, and the first in 24 years, to run under 52 seconds at the NCAA East Regionals in Jacksonville. She was a semi-finalist at the 2022 NCAA Outdoor Championships, where she ran 51.64 seconds, and the 2022 USA Championships, where she ran 51.65 seconds in the heats. Shelby ran a personal best of 51.43 for the 400 metres at the 2023 SEC championships.

She was finalist in the 400 metres at the 2026 USA Indoor Track and Field Championships in New York, placing seventh overall and running 52.68 seconds in the final. She was selected for the United States relay teams at the 2026 World Athletics Indoor Championships in Toruń, Poland.
