= 2026 World Athletics Relays =

Athletics competition in Gaborone, Botswana

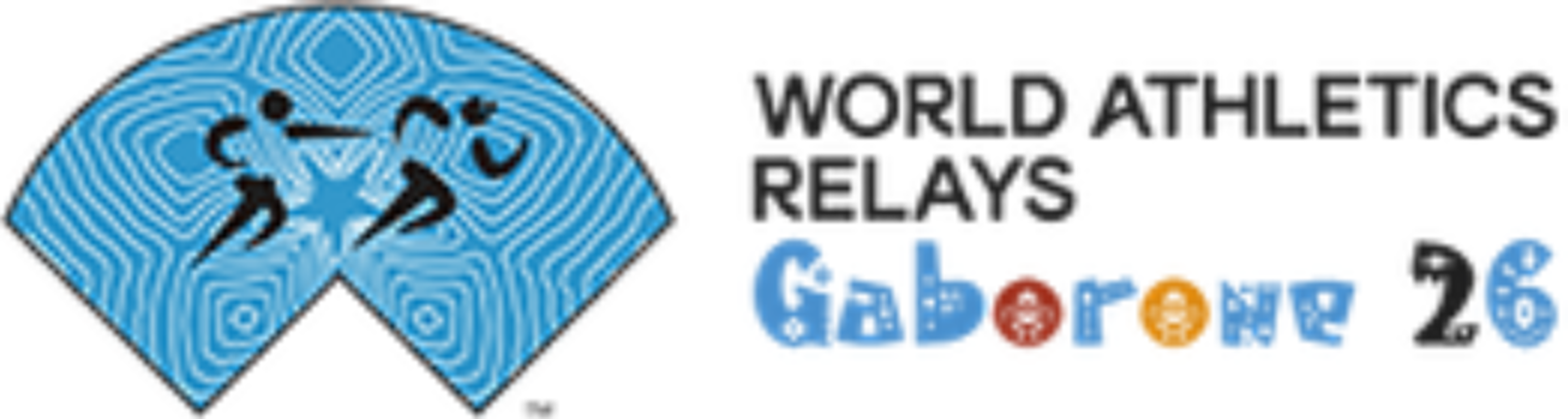
- Host city: Gaborone, Botswana
- Edition: 8th
- Events: 6
- Dates: 2–3 May 2026
- Main venue: Botswana National Stadium

The 2026 World Athletics Relays was held at the Botswana National Stadium in Gaborone, Botswana on 2 and 3 May 2026. It was the 8th edition of the World Athletics Relays and the first time the event was held in Botswana, or in Africa.

== Bidding ==
World Athletics President Sebastian Coe said "This is the fourth World Championship event Africa has staged over the last decade, and we are seeing a real increase in experience, expertise and skills." The World Athletics Council confirmed the hosts for three World Athletics Series events and made a series of other decisions during the 237th World Athletics Council Meeting in Nanjing, China from 24 to 25 March. The World Athletics Relays in Gaborone will mark Botswana’s first time hosting a World Athletics Series event. The capital city held a Continental Tour Gold meeting in 2023 and also held the Botswana Golden Grand Prix in 2024.

== Overview ==
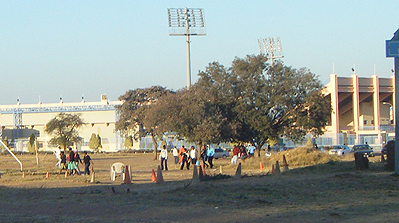
Botswana National Stadium in Gaborone where the 2026 World Athletics Relays will be held

The event served as a qualifying event for the 2026 World Athletics Ultimate Championship in Budapest and the 2027 World Athletics Championships in Beijing; the top six teams in the 4 × 100 metres mixed relay and the 4 × 400 metres relay qualified for Budapest, while the top 12 teams in each event qualified for Beijing.

== Schedule ==
All times are local (UTC+2) Central Africa Time.

Day 1–2 May 2026
Time CAT	Event	Round
14:05	Mixed 4 × 100 m	Heats
14:30	Mixed 4 × 400 m	Heats
15:05	Women's 4 × 100 m	Heats
15:30	Men's 4 × 100 m	Heats
15:55	Women's 4 × 400 m	Heats
16:30	Men's 4 × 400 m	Heats

Day 2–3 May 2026
Time CAT	Event	Round
14:02	Mixed 4 × 100 m	Repechage round
14:20	Mixed 4 × 400 m	Repechage round
14:44	Women's 4 × 400 m	Repechage round
15:08	Men's 4 × 400 m	Repechage round
15:30	Women's 4 × 100 m	Repechage round
15:47	Men's 4 × 100 m	Repechage round
16:05	Mixed 4 × 100 m	Final
16:13	Mixed 4 × 400 m	Final
16:24	Women's 4 × 100 m	Final
16:32	Men's 4 × 100 m	Final
16:40	Women's 4 × 400 m	Final
16:51	Men's 4 × 400 m	Final

== Medal table ==
* Host nation (Botswana)

Rank	Nation	Gold	Silver	Bronze	Total
1	Jamaica	2	1	0	3
2	United States	2	0	1	3
3	Botswana*	1	0	0	1
3	Norway	1	0	0	1
5	Canada	0	2	1	3
6	South Africa	0	2	0	2
7	Spain	0	1	1	2
8	Australia	0	0	1	1
8	Germany	0	0	1	1
8	Great Britain	0	0	1	1
Totals (10 entries)		6	6	6	18

== Medalists ==
Event	Gold		Silver		Bronze	
Men's 4 × 100 metres relay	United States; Ronnie Baker; Max Thomas; Lance Lang; Pjai Austin	37.43	South Africa; Myuyo Moss; Cheswill Johnson; Bradley Nkoana; Akani Simbine	37.49 AR	Germany; Kevin Kranz; Marvin Schulte; Owen Ansah; Lucas Ansah-Peprah	37.76
Men's 4 × 400 metres relay	Botswana; Lee Eppie; Letsile Tebogo; Bayapo Ndori; Collen Kebinatshipi; Justice Oratile*	2:54.47 CR	South Africa; Mthi Mthimkulu; Lythe Pillay; Leendert Koekemoer; Zakithi Nene; Udeme Okon*	2:55.07 NR	Australia; Luke van Ratingen; Reece Holder; Tom Reynolds; Aidan Murphy; Matthew Hunt*	2:55.20 AR
Women's 4 × 100 metres relay	Jamaica; Briana Williams; Jodean Williams; Lavanya Williams; Elaine Thompson-Herah; Shericka Jackson*; Jonielle Smith*	42.00	Canada; Sade McCreath; Audrey Leduc; Marie-Éloïse Leclair; Donna Ntambue	42.17 NR	Spain; Lucia Carrillo; Jaël Bestué; Esperança Cladera; María Isabel Pérez	42.31
Women's 4 × 400 metres relay	Norway; Josefine Tomine Eriksen Aks; Amalie Iuel; Astri Ertzgaard; Henriette Jæger	3:20.96 NR	Spain; Paula Sevilla; Ana Prieto; Rocío Arroyo; Blanca Hervás	3:21.25 NR	Canada; Zoe Sherar; Lauren Gale; Jasneet Nijjar; Savannah Sutherland; Dianna Proctor*	3:22.66
Mixed 4 × 100 metres relay details	Jamaica; Ackeem Blake; Tina Clayton; Kadrian Goldson; Tia Clayton	39.62 WR	Canada; Eliezer Adjibi; Marie-Éloïse Leclair; Duan Asemota; Audrey Leduc	40.23	United States; Courtney Lindsey; Jada Mowatt; Kyree King; E'Lexis Hollis	40.33
Mixed 4 × 400 metres relay details	United States; Bryce Deadmon; Paris Peoples; Jenoah McKiver; Bailey Lear; Brian Faust*	3:07.47 CR	Jamaica; Deandre Watkin; Shana Kaye Anderson; Antonio Watson; Rushell Clayton	3:08.24 NR	Great Britain; Alex Haydock-Wilson; Lina Nielsen; Jake Minshull; Yemi Mary John	3:09.84

== Participating nations ==
723 athletes from 40 federations are entered to the championships.

- Australia
- Belgium
- Botswana (host)
- Brazil
- Canada
- Chile
- People's Republic of China
- Colombia
- Czechia
- Denmark
- Ethiopia
- France
- Germany
- Ghana
- Great Britain
- Hungary
- India
- Ireland
- Italy
- Jamaica
- Japan
- Kenya
- Mexico
- Netherlands
- New Zealand
- Nigeria
- Norway
- Paraguay
- Poland
- Portugal
- Qatar
- Senegal
- South Africa
- Spain
- Switzerland
- Uganda
- Ukraine
- United States
- Venezuela
- Zimbabwe

== Qualification for 2027 World Athletics Championships ==
=== Men's 4 × 100 m relay ===
Qualification event	No. of teams	Qualified teams
2026 World Athletics Relays	12	Australia; Belgium; Botswana; Canada; China; Germany; Ghana; Great Britain; Jamaica; Netherlands; South Africa; United States
Total	12	

=== Men's 4 × 400 m relay ===
Qualification event	No. of teams	Qualified teams
2026 World Athletics Relays	12	Australia Belgium; Botswana; Brazil; Japan; Netherlands; Portugal; Qatar; South Africa; Senegal; Spain; Zimbabwe
Total	12	

=== Women's 4 × 100 m relay ===
Qualification event	No. of teams	Qualified teams
2026 World Athletics Relays	12	Australia; Canada; China; France; Germany; Great Britain; Italy; Jamaica; Nigeria; Poland; Portugal; Spain
Total	12	

=== Women's 4 × 400 m relay ===
Qualification event	No. of teams	Qualified teams
2026 World Athletics Relays	12	Australia; Canada; Czech Republic; France; Germany; Great Britain; Ireland; Italy; Netherlands; Norway; Poland; Spain
Total	12	

=== Mixed 4 × 100 m relay ===
Teams in bold also qualified for the 2026 World Athletics Ultimate Championship.

Qualification event	No. of teams	Qualified teams
2026 World Athletics Relays	12	Australia; **Canada**; **Germany**; Great Britain; Italy; **Jamaica**; Netherlands; **Nigeria**; Portugal; **Spain**; Switzerland; **United States**
Total	12	

=== Mixed 4 × 400 m relay ===
Teams in bold also qualified for the 2026 World Athletics Ultimate Championship.

Qualification event	No. of teams	Qualified teams
2026 World Athletics Relays	12	Australia; Belgium; Canada; **Great Britain**; **Italy**; **Jamaica**; **Kenya**; Nigeria; Poland; South Africa; **Spain**; **United States**
Total	12	
