= Sara Reifenrath =

American sprinter

Personal information
- Born: 4 April 2002 (age 24)

Sport
- Sport: Athletics
- Event: Sprint

Achievements and titles
- Personal best(s): 400m: 51.91 (College Station, 2025)

Sara Reifenrath (born 4 April 2002) is an American sprinter.

== Biography ==
Reifenrath is from Hartington, Nebraska and attended Cedar Catholic High School before studying at the University of South Dakota, graduating in 2025. During her college track and field career she was Summit League champion 23 times.

In 2025, she qualified for the 2025 NCAA Outdoor Championships, and broke her own 400 metres school record twice at the NCAA Division I West First Rounds running 51.91 seconds. In doing so, she became the first South Dakota Coyote woman to run under 52 seconds for the distance. At the 2025 NCAA Outdoor Championships in June, she placed twentieth with a time of 52.72 seconds.

She was finalist in the 400 metres at the 2026 USA Indoor Track and Field Championships in New York, placing eighth overall and running 52.93 seconds in the final. She was selected for the United States relay teams at the 2026 World Athletics Indoor Championships in Toruń, Poland. Competing in the mixed 4 x 400 metres relay, she fell at her baton exchange with Jevon O'Bryant following a racing incident for which the Jamaican team were later disqualified. Although she got up to continue, the American team did not feature again at the front of the race, placing fifth. Such was the impact of her fall, Reifenrath lost a shoe and had to complete her leg of the race wearing just one.
