= Alex Haydock-Wilson =

British athlete (born 1999)

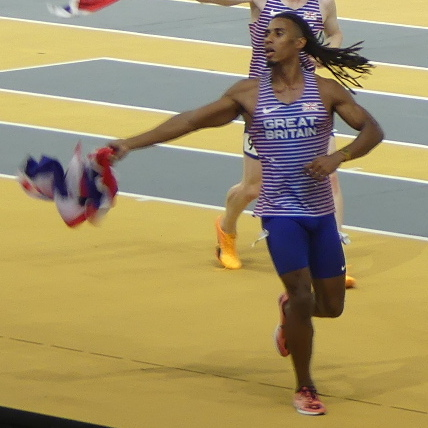
- Haydock-Wilson in 2023

Personal information
- Nationality: British (English)
- Born: 28 July 1999 (age 27) Lewisham, London, England

Sport
- Sport: Athletics
- Event: 400 metres
- Club: Windsor, Slough, Eton & Hounslow AC

Achievements and titles
- Personal bests: 100 m: 10.57 (Bromley 2021); 200 m: 20.89 (Eton 2021); 300 m: 32.65 (Bergen 2022); 400 m: 45.08 (Eugene 2022)
Medal record
Men's athletics
Representing Great Britain
Olympic Games
Bronze medal – third place	2024 Paris	4×400 m
Bronze medal – third place	2024 Paris	4×400 m mixed
World Championships
Bronze medal – third place	2023 Budapest	4×400 m relay
European Championships
Gold medal – first place	2022 Munich	4×400 m relay
Bronze medal – third place	2022 Munich	400 m
World Relays
Bronze medal – third place	2026 Gaborone	4 × 400 m mixed
World U20 Championships
Bronze medal – third place	2018 Tampere	4×400 m relay
British Athletics Championships
Gold medal – first place	2023 Manchester	400m

Alex Haydock-Wilson (born 28 July 1999) is a British track and field athlete. In 2023, he became British 400 metres champion outdoors, and in 2025 repeated the feat indoors. He achieved two bronze medals at the 2024 Summer Olympics, in the mixed 4 × 400 m relay and the men's 4 × 400 m relay.

== Early life ==
Haydock-Wilson studied at the Windsor Boys School, before moving in to further education studying Materials Science and Engineering at the University of Loughborough. In 2022, he was awarded a first-class degree and started his PhD in photovoltaic technology.

== Career ==
Haydock-Wilson was a member of the British 4 x 400-metre relay team that won bronze at the 2018 IAAF World U20 Championships. In 2019, he won a bronze medal in the 400m at the British indoor senior championships.

At the 2022 World Athletics Championships, Haydock-Wilson qualified from the heats to reach the semi-finals of the men's 400 metres where he ran a new personal best time. He also competed in the mixed 4 x 400 metres relay.

At the 2022 European Championships he won bronze in the finals of the men's 400 metres, and gold in the finals of the men's 4 x 400 metres relay.

In 2023, he became British champion over 400 metres. He was chosen to represent Great Britain at the 2023 World Athletics Championships in Budapest in August 2023.

In April 2024, he was selected as part of the British team for the 2024 World Athletics Relays in Nassau, Bahamas. In May 2024, he was selected to run the 400 metres and 4 × 400 m relay for Britain at the 2024 European Athletics Championships in Rome. Competing at the 2024 British Athletics Championships in Manchester he placed third overall on 30 June 2024.

He was named in the Great Britain team for the 2024 Summer Olympics and was part of the mixed 4x400 team which won a bronze medal in a new national record of 3:08.01. He also competed in the men's 4 × 400 m relay at the Games, winning a second bronze medal.

He won the 400 metres title at the 2025 British Indoor Athletics Championships in Birmingham, on 23 February 2025. He was selected for the British team for the 2025 European Athletics Indoor Championships in Apeldoorn. He ran in the men's 4 × 400 m relay in which the British team placed fourth. He was named in the British team for the 2025 World Athletics Relays in Guangzhou.

On 2 August, he qualified for the final of the 400 metres at the 2025 UK Athletics Championships in Birmingham.

Haydock-Wilson was named in the British squad for the 4 x 400 metres relay at the 2026 World Athletics Relays in Gaborone, Botswana. On the opening day of the competition he was part of the British mixed 4 × 400 m team as they qualified for the final with the fastest time of 3:09.69. The following day, he was part of the quartet that won the bronze medal in the event. Previously coached by Dai Greene, in 2026 he began working with Jamie Webb.

== Personal life ==
In 2025, Haydock-Wilson was diagnosed with bipolar disorder.
