= Bryce Deadmon =

American sprinter (born 1997)

Personal information
- Born: March 26, 1997 (age 29) Missouri City, Texas, U.S.

Sport
- Country: United States
- Sport: Track and field
- Event: 400 m
- College team: Texas A&M Aggies

Achievements and titles
- Personal best: 400 m: 44.22 (2023)
Medal record
Men's athletics
Representing the United States
Olympic Games
Gold medal – first place	2020 Tokyo	4 × 400 m relay
Gold medal – first place	2024 Paris	4 × 400 m relay
Silver medal – second place	2024 Paris	4 × 400 m mixed
Bronze medal – third place	2020 Tokyo	4 × 400 m mixed
World Championships
Gold medal – first place	2022 Eugene	4 × 400 m relay
Gold medal – first place	2025 Tokyo	4 × 400 m mixed
Silver medal – second place	2025 Tokyo	4 × 400 m relay
World Relays
Gold medal – first place	2026 Gaborone	Mixed 4 × 400 m relay
NACAC Championships
Gold medal – first place	2022 Freeport	4 × 400 m relay
Bronze medal – third place	2022 Freeport	400 m

Bryce Deadmon (born March 26, 1997) is an American track and field athlete. In July 2023, he became US national champion in the 400 meters.

== Biography ==
A student at the Texas A&M University, Deadmon was the 2021 SEC Outdoor championship 400 m runner up running 44.50 behind Noah Williams, as well as the 2021 NCAA 400 m runner-up at Hayward Field at the University of Oregon in Eugene running 44.44 to finish behind Randolph Ross.

He qualified for the final of the US Olympic Trials men's 400 m race, running 45.46 and 45.17 in his heats to qualify as 8th fastest man. In the final he placed seventh with a 44.96 and qualified for the US men's relay pool for the 4 × 400 m. At the Olympics he took part in the Mixed 4 × 400 metres relay and the Men's 4 × 400 metres relay, winning a bronze medal in the former and a gold medal in the latter.

Competing at the 2023 USA Outdoor Track and Field Championships, in Eugene, Oregon, he won the final of the 400 m. He was selected for the 2023 World Athletics Championships in Budapest, Hungary, in August 2023.

In April 2024, he was selected as part of the American team for the 2024 World Athletics Relays in Nassau, Bahamas. He competed in the men's 4 × 400 metres relay at the 2024 Paris Olympics, winning gold at his second consecutive Olympic Games. He also competed in the mixed 4 × 400 m relay at the Games, winning the silver medal.

He finished fourth in the 400 metres at the 2025 Meeting International Mohammed VI d'Athlétisme de Rabat, part of the 2025 Diamond League, in May 2025. He qualified for the final of the 400 metres at the 2025 USA Outdoor Track and Field Championships in Eugene, winning his semi-final with the fastest time of 44.34 seconds before placing sixth in the final in 45.39 seconds.

He was selected for the American team for the 2025 World Athletics Championships in Tokyo, Japan, as part of the relay pool. He ran on the opening day as the American mixed 4 × 400 metres relay team reached the final, before also running as they won the gold medal. He also won a silver medal in the men's 4 x 400 metres relay at the championships. Initially, his American team had not qualified for the final but the handover between Deadmon and Demarius Smith was adjudged to have been impacted by a runner for Zambia, and they were put forward for a run-off with the same team in the same lanes against Kenya, who had also been impacted. He ran as they won the run-off on the morning of the final, with a time of 2:58.48, before a different quartet ran the final later that day, placing second behind Botswana.

Deadmon was named in the United States team for the 2026 World Athletics Relays in Gaborone, Botswana. He ran as part of the mixed 4 x 400 metres relay team which won the gold medal having also won their heat on the opening day. On 6 June, he ran 44.74 seconds to finish runner-up to Chris Bailey at the USATF Lone Star Grand Prix in College Station, Texas.

== Statistics ==
Grand Slam Track results
Slam	Race group	Event	Pl.	Time	Prize money
2025 Miami Slam	Long sprints	200 m	8th	21.01	US$10,000
2025 Miami Slam	Long sprints	400 m	7th	45.52	US$10,000
