= List of Oceanian records in athletics =

Oceanian records in the sport of athletics are ratified by the Oceania Athletics Association (OAA).

== Outdoor ==
Key to tables: Awaiting ratification Record not kept by OAA Not ratified or later rescinded by OAA

=== Men ===
Event	Record	Athlete	Nationality	Date	Meet	Place	Ref.
60 m	6.43 (+1.6 m/s)	Lachlan Kennedy	Australia	25 January 2025	ACT Open Championships	Canberra, Australia	
100 y	9.36+ (−0.2 m/s)	Rohan Browning	Australia	11 March 2023	Sydney Track Classic	Sydney, Australia	
100 y	9.2 h	Bob Lay	Australia	10 March 1965		Sydney, Australia	
100 m	9.85 (+1.3 m/s)	Lachlan Kennedy	Australia	28 July 2026	Commonwealth Games	Glasgow, Scotland	
150 m	14.96 (±0.0 m/s)	Gout Gout	Australia	16 June 2026	65th Ostrava Golden Spike	Ostrava, Czech Republic	
200 m	19.67 (+1.7 m/s)	Gout Gout	Australia	12 April 2026	Australian Championships	Sydney, Australia	
300 m	31.88	Darren Clark	Australia	30 June 1986		Belfast, United Kingdom	
400 m	44.38	Darren Clark	Australia	26 September 1988	Olympic Games	Seoul, South Korea	
600 m	1:15.14	Lachlan Renshaw	Australia	20 February 2010		Sydney, Australia	
800 m	1:42.55	Peter Bol	Australia	11 July 2025	Herculis	Fontvieille, Monaco	
1000 m	2:15.13	Peter Bol	Australia	16 June 2026	65th Ostrava Golden Spike	Ostrava, Czech Republic	
1500 m	3:28.00	Cameron Myers	Australia	28 June 2026	Meeting de Paris	Paris, France	
Mile	3:46.06	Cameron Myers	Australia	4 July 2026	Prefontaine Classic	Eugene, United States	
Mile (road)	3:53.65	Oliver Hoare	Australia	19 September 2026	World Road Running Championships	Copenhagen, Denmark	
2000 m	4:48.77	Stewart McSweyn	Australia	8 September 2023	Memorial Van Damme	Brussels, Belgium	
3000 m	7:28.02	Stewart McSweyn	Australia	17 September 2020	Golden Gala	Rome, Italy	
Two miles	8:03.50	Craig Mottram	Australia	10 June 2007	Prefontaine Classic	Eugene, United States	
5000 m	12:50.82	Ky Robinson	Australia	10 June 2026	Bislett Games	Oslo, Norway	
5 km (road)	13:04	Ky Robinson	Australia	19 September 2026	World Road Running Championships	Copenhagen, Denmark	
10,000 m	26:57.07	Ky Robinson	Australia	28 March 2026	The TEN	San Juan Capistrano, United States	
10 km (road)	27:28	Zane Robertson	New Zealand	9 October 2016	Grand 10 Berlin	Berlin, Germany	
10 km (road)	27:28	Jake Robertson	New Zealand	1 April 2018	Crescent City Classic	New Orleans, United States	
15 km (road)	42:17+	Zane Robertson	New Zealand	1 February 2015	Kagawa Marugame Half Marathon	Marugame, Japan	
20,000 m (track)	58:37.2+ h	Robert de Castella	Australia	17 April 1982		Rome, Italy	
20 km (road)	56:40+	Zane Robertson	New Zealand	1 February 2015	Kagawa Marugame Half Marathon	Marugame, Japan	
One hour	20516 m	Robert de Castella	Australia	17 April 1982		Rome, Italy	
Half marathon	59:47	Zane Robertson	New Zealand	1 February 2015	Kagawa Marugame Half Marathon	Marugame, Japan	
25,000 m (track)	1:16:29.0	Jack Foster	New Zealand	15 August 1971		Hamilton, New Zealand	
25 km (road)	1:14:41.4	Robert de Castella	Australia	4 July 1981		Perth, Australia	
30,000 m (track)	1:32:18.6	Jack Foster	New Zealand	15 August 1971		Hamilton, New Zealand	
30 km (road)	1:30:08+	Jake Robertson	New Zealand	21 October 2018	Toronto Marathon	Toronto, Canada	
30 km (road)	1:30:08+	Brett Robinson	Australia	4 December 2022	Fukuoka Marathon	Fukuoka, Japan	
30 km (road)	1:30:06+ a	Lee Troop	Australia	18 April 2004	London Marathon	London, United Kingdom	
Marathon	2:06:22	Andy Buchanan	Australia	1 December 2024	Valencia Marathon	Valencia, Spain	
Marathon	2:06:20	Haftu Strintzos	Australia	5 July 2026	Gold Coast Marathon	Gold Coast, Australia	
100 km	6:29:26 a	Tim Sloane	Australia	23 April 1995		Richmond, Australia	
24 hours	303506 m	Yiannis Kouros	Australia	24 October 1997	Sri Chinmoy 24 Hour Race	Kensington, Australia	
110 m hurdles	13.29 (+0.6 m/s)	Kyle Vander-Kuyp	Australia	11 August 1995	World Championships	Gothenburg, Sweden	
200 m hurdles	22.85 (+0.2 m/s)	Kyle Vander-Kuyp	Australia	21 March 1995		Sydney, Australia	
200 m hurdles	22.59 (+0.2 m/s)	Darryl Wohlsen	Australia	14 March 1996		Brisbane, Australia	
400 m hurdles	48.28	Rohan Robinson	Australia	31 July 1996	Olympic Games	Atlanta, United States	
2000 m steeplechase	5:24.06 (Note: Ratified by the OAA as an "Oceania Best Performance".)	Peter Renner	New Zealand	19 July 1986		Birmingham, United Kingdom	
3000 m steeplechase	8:09.64	Geordie Beamish	New Zealand	7 July 2024	Meeting de Paris	Paris, France	
High jump	2.36 m	Tim Forsyth	Australia	2 March 1997	Melbourne Track Classic	Melbourne, Australia	
High jump	2.36 m	Brandon Starc	Australia	26 August 2018	Internationales Hochsprung-Meeting	Eberstadt, Germany	
High jump	2.36 m	Hamish Kerr	New Zealand	10 August 2024	Olympic Games	Paris, France	
Pole vault	6.05 m (Note: outdoor best; indoor mark ratified as absolute record)	Dmitri Markov	Australia	9 August 2001	World Championships	Edmonton, Canada	
Long jump	8.54 m (+1.7 m/s)	Mitchell Watt	Australia	29 July 2011	DN Galan	Stockholm, Sweden	
Triple jump	17.46 m (+1.7 m/s)	Ken Lorraway	Australia	7 August 1982		London, United Kingdom	
Shot put	22.90 m	Tomas Walsh	New Zealand	5 October 2019	World Championships	Doha, Qatar	
Discus throw	74.78 m	Matthew Denny	Australia	13 April 2025	Oklahoma Throws Series World Invitational	Ramona, United States	
Hammer throw	79.29 m	Stuart Rendell	Australia	6 July 2002		Varaždin, Croatia	
Javelin throw	89.02 m	Jarrod Bannister	Australia	29 February 2008		Brisbane, Australia	
Decathlon	8649 pts	Ashley Moloney	Australia	4–5 August 2021	Olympic Games	Tokyo, Japan	
Decathlon	100m (wind) / Long jump (wind) / Shot put / High jump / 400m / 110m H (wind) / Discus / Pole vault / Javelin / 1500m; 10.34 (+0.2 m/s) / 7.64 m (+0.4 m/s) / 14.49 m / 2.11 m / 46.29 / 14.08 (−1.0 m/s) / 44.38 m / 5.00 m / 57.12 m / 4:39.19						
Mile walk	5:50.70	Rhydian Cowley	Australia	14 December 2023	Collingwood Classic	Melbourne, Australia	
3000 m walk (track)	10:54.70	Dane Bird-Smith	Australia	11 February 2017	QA Norma Croker Shield	Brisbane, Australia	
5000 m walk (track)	18:38.97	Dane Bird-Smith	Australia	5 March 2016	Melbourne Track Classic	Melbourne, Australia	
5000 m walk (track)	18:24.50	Declan Tingay	Australia	26 February 2022	Victoria Open Championships	Melbourne, Australia	
5000 m walk (track)	18:12.52	Declan Tingay	Australia	5 March 2023	Victorian Open Championships	Melbourne, Australia	
10,000 m walk (track)	38:03.78	Declan Tingay	Australia	2 February 2023	Supernova #2	Canberra, Australia	
10,000 m walk (track)	38:02.68	Isaac Beacroft	Australia	11 December 2025	New South Wales 10000m Walk Championships	Sydney, Australia	
10 km walk (road)	38:07	David Smith	Australia	25 September 1986		Sydney, Australia	
20,000 m walk (track)	1:19:48.1	Nathan Deakes	Australia	4 September 2001		Brisbane, Australia	
20 km walk (road)	1:17:33	Nathan Deakes	Australia	23 April 2005		Cixi City, China	
Half Marathon walk (road)	1:23:41	Declan Tingay	Australia	1 March 2026	Chinese Race Walking Grand Prix	Taicang, China	
30,000 m walk (track)	2:14:22	Simon Baker	Australia	9 September 1990		Melbourne, Australia	
30 km walk (road)	2:03:15+	Rhydian Cowley	Australia	16 March 2025	Asian Race Walking Championships	Nomi, Japan	
35 km walk (road)	2:25:21	Rhydian Cowley	Australia	16 March 2025	World Athletics Race Walking Tour	Nomi, Japan	
Marathon walk (road)	3:03:49	Rhydian Cowley	Australia	25 October 2026	All Japan Race Walking competition Takahata	Takahata, Japan	
50,000 m walk (track)	3:43:50.0	Simon Baker	Australia	9 September 1990		Melbourne, Australia	
50 km walk (road)	3:35:47	Nathan Deakes	Australia	2 December 2006		Geelong, Australia	
4 × 100 m relay	37.87	Lachlan Kennedy; Joshua Azzopardi; Christopher Ius; Calab Law	Australia	15 March 2025	Sydney Track Classic	Sydney, Australia	
4 × 100 m relay	37.87	Lachlan Kennedy; Joshua Azzopardi; Christopher Ius; Rohan Browning	Australia	2 May 2026	World Athletics Relays	Gaborone, Botswana	
4 × 200 m relay	1:23.04	Scott Vassella; Shem Hollands; Dean Capobianco; Peter Vassella	Australia	6 December 1998		Sydney, Australia	
4 × 400 m relay	2:59.70	Darren Clark; Rick Mitchell; Gary Minihan; Bruce Frayne	Australia	11 August 1984	Olympic Games	Los Angeles, United States	
4 × 400 m relay	2:57.30	Luke van Ratingen; Reece Holder; Matthew Hunt; Aidan Murphy	Australia	2 May 2026	World Athletics Relays	Gaborone, Botswana	
4 × 400 m relay	2:55.20	Luke van Ratingen; Reece Holder; Tom Reynolds; Aidan Murphy	Australia	3 May 2026	World Athletics Relays	Gaborone, Botswana	
4 × 800 m relay	7:11.48	Josh Ralph; Ryan Gregson; Jordan Willamsz; Jared West	Australia	24 May 2014	IAAF World Relays	Nassau, Bahamas	
Distance medley relay	9:17.56	Ryan Gregson 2:48.66 (1200m); Sean Wroe 45.96 (400m); Lachlan Renshaw 1:46.29 (800m); Jeff Riseley 3:56.66 (1600 m)	Australia	30 April 2011	Penn Relays	Philadelphia, United States	
4 × 1500 m relay	14:46.04	Australia; Ryan Gregson; Sam McEntee; Collis Birmingham; Jordan Willamsz	Australia	25 May 2014	IAAF World Relays	Nassau, Bahamas	
4 × 1500 m relay	14:40.4 h	Tony Polhill 3:42.9; John Walker 3:40.4; Rod Dixon 3:41.2; Dick Quax 3:35.9	New Zealand	22 August 1973	Bislett Games	Oslo, Norway	
4 × mile relay	15:59.57	Tony Rogers; John Bowden; Mike Gilchrist; John Walker	New Zealand	2 March 1983		Auckland, New Zealand	
Marathon road relay (Ekiden)	2:03.13	Collis Birmingham (13:33); Lee Troop (28:50); Michael Shelley (14:08); Brett Cartwright (30:12); Liam Adams (14:56); Martin Dent (21:34)	Australia	23 November 2006	International Chiba Ekiden	Chiba, Japan	

=== Women ===
Event	Record	Athlete	Nationality	Date	Meet	Place	Ref.
60 m	7.16 (+0.7 m/s)	Sally Pearson	Australia	25 June 2011	Gold Coast Winter Series	Gold Coast, Australia	
60 m	7.16 (+1.3 m/s)	Ella Connolly	Australia	1 February 2025	(The Inaugural) Australia Short Track Championships	Sydney, Australia	
100 y	10.11+ (+0.5 m/s)	Zoe Hobbs	New Zealand	11 March 2023	Sydney Track Classic	Sydney, Australia	
100 m	10.93 (+1.0 m/s)	Zoe Hobbs	New Zealand	28 July 2026	Commonwealth Games	Glasgow, Scotland	
150 m (straight)	16.86 (+0.9 m/s)	Sally Pearson	Australia	18 September 2010	Great City Games	Newcastle, United Kingdom	
200 m	22.23 (+0.8 m/s)	Melinda Gainsford-Taylor	Australia	13 July 1997		Stuttgart, Germany	
300 m	36.34	Jana Pittman	Australia	15 February 2003	Telstra A-Series	Campbelltown, Australia	
400 m	48.63	Cathy Freeman	Australia	29 July 1996	Olympic Games	Atlanta, United States	
600 m	1:25.79	Tamsyn Manou	Australia	5 July 2012	Meeting de la Province de Liège	Liège, Belgium	
800 m	1:57.01	Sarah Billings	Australia	28 June 2026	Meeting de Paris	Paris, France	
1000 m	2:30.96	Jessica Hull	Australia	11 July 2025	Herculis	Fontvieille, Monaco	
1500 m	3:50.83 (Note: by official result source; 3:50.38 by OAA source, a typo)	Jessica Hull	Australia	7 July 2024	Meeting de Paris	Paris, France	
Mile	4:13.68	Jessica Hull	Australia	19 July 2025	London Athletics Meet	London, United Kingdom	
Mile (road)	4:26.4 h Wo	Jaylah Hancock-Cameron	Australia	25 April 2026	Ballarat Road Races - Australian Road Mile Championships	Ballarat, Australia	
2000 m	5:19.70	Jessica Hull	Australia	12 July 2024	Herculis	Fontvieille, Monaco	
3000 m	8:24.20	Georgia Griffith	Australia	30 May 2024	Bislett Games	Oslo, Norway	
Two miles	9:43.53	Georgie Clarke	Australia	20 May 2007	Adidas Track Classic	Carson, United States	
5000 m	14:31.45	Rose Davies	Australia	19 July 2025	London Athletics Meet	London, United Kingdom	
5 km (road)	14:48	Kimberly Smith	New Zealand	30 March 2013		Westfield, United States	
10,000 m	30:34.11	Rose Davies	Australia	11 June 2025	Bislett Games	Oslo, Norway	
10 km (road)	30:44	Isobel Batt-Doyle	Australia	3 May 2025	Tokyo : Speed : Race	Tokyo, Japan	
15 km (road)	47:59+	Kerryn McCann	Australia	10 January 2000		Tokyo, Japan	
10 miles (road)	51:04+	Kim Smith	New Zealand	18 September 2011	Philadelphia Half Marathon	Philadelphia, United States	
20 km (road)	1:03:58+	Kim Smith	New Zealand	18 September 2011	Philadelphia Half Marathon	Philadelphia, United States	
Half marathon	1:07:11	Kim Smith	New Zealand	18 September 2011	Philadelphia Half Marathon	Philadelphia, United States	
25 km (road)	1:23:25+	Benita Johnson	Australia	22 October 2006	Chicago Marathon	Chicago, United States	
25 km (road)	1:23:25+ Mx	Isobel Batt-Doyle	Australia	11 October 2026	Chicago Marathon	Chicago, United States	
30 km (road)	1:41:43	Kimberley Smith	New Zealand	25 April 2010		London, United Kingdom	
30 km (road)	1:40:12+	Benita Johnson	Australia	22 October 2006	Chicago Marathon	Chicago, United States	
30 km (road)	1:40:08+ Mx	Isobel Batt-Doyle	Australia	11 October 2026	Chicago Marathon	Chicago, United States	
Marathon	2:20:38 Mx	Isobel Batt-Doyle	Australia	11 October 2026	Chicago Marathon	Chicago, United States	
100 km	7:34:25	Kirstin Bull	Australia	27 November 2016	IAU 100 km World Championships	Los Alcázares, Spain	
24 hours (road)	274.172 km	Holly Ranson	Australia	19 October 2025	IAU 24 Hour World Championship	Albi, France	
100 m hurdles	12.28 (+1.1 m/s)	Sally Pearson	Australia	3 September 2011	World Championships	Daegu, South Korea	
200 m hurdles (bend)	25.79 (−0.6 m/s)	Lauren Wells	Australia	21 January 2017	Athletics ACT Combined Events Championships	Canberra, Australia	
200 m hurdles (bend)	25.7 h	Pam Kilborn-Ryan	Australia	25 November 1971		Melbourne, Australia	
300 m hurdles	39.00	Jana Pittman	Australia	11 July 2004		Meilen, Switzerland	
400 m hurdles	53.17	Debbie Flintoff-King	Australia	27 September 1988	Olympic Games	Seoul, South Korea	
2000 m steeplechase	6:20.06	Donna MacFarlane	Australia	2 February 2008		Hobart, Australia	
2000 m steeplechase	6:16.86	Genevieve LaCaze	Australia	6 September 2015	ISTAF	Berlin, Germany	
2000 m steeplechase	6:09.48	Genevieve Gregson	Australia	1 September 2019	ISTAF Berlin	Berlin, Germany	
3000 m steeplechase	9:14.28	Genevieve LaCaze	Australia	27 August 2016	Meeting Areva	Saint-Denis, France	
High jump	2.04 m	Nicola Olyslagers	Australia	27 August 2025	Weltklasse Zürich	Zurich, Switzerland	
Pole vault	4.95 m	Nina Kennedy	Australia	10 July 2026	Herculis	Fontvieille, Monaco	
Long jump	7.13 m (+1.8 m/s)	Brooke Buschkuehl	Australia	9 July 2022	MVA High Performance #2	Chula Vista, United States	
Triple jump	14.04 m (+2.0 m/s)	Nicole Mladenis	Australia	9 March 2002		Hobart, Australia	
Triple jump	14.04 m (+1.8 m/s)	Nicole Mladenis	Australia	7 December 2003		Perth, Australia	
Shot put	21.24 m	Valerie Adams	New Zealand	29 August 2011	World Championships	Daegu, South Korea	
Discus throw	69.64 m	Dani Stevens	Australia	13 August 2017	World Championships	London, United Kingdom	
Hammer throw	74.61 m	Lauren Bruce	New Zealand	20 May 2021	Tucson Elite Classic	Tucson, United States	
Javelin throw	68.92 m	Kathryn Mitchell	Australia	11 April 2018	Commonwealth Games	Gold Coast, Australia	
Heptathlon	6695 pts	Jane Flemming	Australia	27–28 January 1990	Commonwealth Games	Auckland, New Zealand	
Heptathlon	100m H (wind) / High jump / Shot put / 200m (wind) / Long jump (wind) / Javelin / 800m; 13.21 (+1.4 m/s) / 1.82 m / 13.76 m / 23.62 (+2.4 m/s) / 6.57 m (+1.6 m/s) / 49.28 m / 2:12.53						
Decathlon	5927 pts	Meagan Rentsch	Australia	3–4 April 1999		Adelaide, Australia	
Decathlon	100m (wind) / Long jump (wind) / Shot put / High jump / 400m / 110m H (wind) / Discus / Pole vault / Javelin / 1500m						
Decathlon	7900 pts	Camryn Newton-Smith	Australia	8–9 August 2026	Women's Decathlon World Championships	Geneva, United States	
Decathlon	100m (wind) / Discus / Pole vault / Javelin / 400m / 100m H (wind) / Long jump (wind) / Shot put / High jump / 1500m; 11.83 (+1.4 m/s) / 34.22 m / 3.50 m / 37.15 m / 55.41 / 13.61 (+0.3 m/s) / 6.17 m (+0.2 m/s) / 12.86 m / 1.75 m / 5:48.49						
Decathlon	6428 pts	Simone Carré	Australia	10–11 March 2012		Melbourne, Australia	
Decathlon	100m (wind) / Discus / Pole vault / Javelin / 400m / 100m H (wind) / Long jump (wind) / Shot put / High jump / 1500m; / / 3.70 m / / / 15.55 (+1.2 m/s) / 5.34 m (−1.0 m/s) / 11.50 m						
3000 m walk (track)	11:51.26	Kerry Saxby-Junna	Australia	7 February 1991		Melbourne, Australia	
5000 m walk (track)	20:03.0 h	Kerry Saxby-Junna	Australia	11 February 1996		Sydney, Australia	
5000 m walk (track)	20:13.26	Kerry Saxby-Junna	Australia	25 February 1996		Hobart, Australia	
5 km walk (road)	20:25	Kerry Saxby	Australia	10 June 1989	Internationaler Geher-Cup	Hildesheim, West Germany	
10,000 m walk (track)	41:57.22	Kerry Saxby-Junna	Australia	24 July 1990		Seattle, United States	
10 km walk (road)	41:29.71	Kerry Saxby-Junna	Australia	27 August 1988		Canberra, Australia	
20,000 m walk (track)	1:33:40.2	Kerry Saxby-Junna	Australia	6 September 2001		Brisbane, Australia	
20 km walk (road)	1:26:25	Jemima Montag	Australia	1 August 2024	Olympic Games	Paris, France	
Half Marathon walk (road)	1:31:31	Elizabeth McMillen	Australia	25 October 2026	All Japan Race Walking competition Takahata	Takahata, Japan	
30 km walk (road)	2:19:12+ (Note: Split time recorded at the distance of 30.195 km)	Rebecca Henderson	Australia	25 October 2026	All Japan Race Walking competition Takahata	Takahata, Japan	
35 km walk (road)	2:42:40	Olivia Sandery	Australia	16 March 2025	World Athletics Race Walking Tour	Nomi, Japan	
35 km walk (road)	2:42:10+ (Note: Split time recorded at the distance of 35.195 km)	Rebecca Henderson	Australia	25 October 2026	All Japan Race Walking competition Takahata	Takahata, Japan	
Marathon walk (road)	3:14:52	Rebecca Henderson	Australia	25 October 2026	All Japan Race Walking competition Takahata	Takahata, Japan	
50 km walk (road)	4:09:33	Claire Tallent	Australia	5 May 2018	IAAF World Race Walking Team Championships	Taicang, China	
4 × 100 m relay	42.48	Ella Connolly; Bree Masters; Kristie Edwards; Torrie Lewis	Australia	20 July 2024	London Athletics Meet	London, United Kingdom	
4 × 200 m relay	1:32.6	Raelene Boyle; Sue Jowett; Denise Robertson; Barbara Wilson	Australia	25 January 1976		Brisbane, Australia	
4 × 400 m relay	3:23.81	Nova Peris-Kneebone; Tamsyn Manou; Melinda Gainsford-Taylor; Cathy Freeman	Australia	30 September 2000	Olympic Games	Sydney, Australia	
4 × 800 m relay	8:13.26	Brittany McGowan; Zoe Buckman; Selma Kajan; Melissa Duncan	Australia	25 May 2014	IAAF World Relays	Nassau, Bahamas	
Distance medley relay	10:46.94	Melissa Duncan (1200 m); Samantha Lind (400 m); Brittany McGowan (800 m); Heidi See (1600 m)	Australia	2 May 2015	IAAF World Relays	Nassau, Bahamas	
4 × 1500 m relay	17:08.65	Zoe Buckman; Bridey Delaney; Brittany McGowan; Melissa Duncan	Australia	24 May 2014	IAAF World Relays	Nassau, Bahamas	

=== Mixed ===
Event	Record	Athlete	Nationality	Date	Meet	Place	Ref.
4 × 100 m relay	41.09	Calab Law; Zara Hagan; Christopher Ius; Torrie Lewis	Australia	28 June 2026	Meeting de Paris	Paris, France	
4 × 400 m relay	3:17.00	Bendere Oboya; Anneliese Rubie-Renshaw; Tyler Gunn; Alex Beck	Australia	12 June 2021		Runaway Bay, Australia	
4 × 400 m relay	3:12.20	Luke van Ratingen; Ellie Beer; Terrell Thorne; Carla Bull	Australia	11 May 2025	World Relays	Guangzhou, China	

== Indoor ==
=== Men ===
Event	Record	Athlete	Nationality	Date	Meet	Place	Ref.
50 m	5.86	Nick Andrews	Australia	27 January 2023		Saskatoon, Canada	
50 m	5.8 h	Ian Campbell	Australia	18 February 1978		Daly City, United States	
50 m	5.6 h	Craig Daley	New Zealand	2 October 1971		Invercargill, New Zealand	
55 m	6.20	Roman William Cress	Marshall Islands	3 March 2000		Collegeville, United States	
60 m	6.50	Lachlan Kennedy	Australia	21 March 2025	World Championships	Nanjing, China	
200 m	20.71	Damien Marsh	Australia	14 March 1993	World Championships	Toronto, Canada	
300 m	34.43 A	Nicholas Andrews	Australia	14 January 2022		Albuquerque, United States	
300 m	33.2 h OT	Rick Mitchell	Australia	26 July 1978		Moscow, United States	
300 m	34.1 h	Paul Narracott	Australia	26 July 1978		Moscow, United States	
300 m	33.1 h	Daniel Batman	Australia	2 March 2003		Birmingham, United States	
300 m	33.6 h	Daniel Batman	Australia	2 March 2003		Birmingham, United States	
300 m	33.8 h	Daniel Batman	Australia	2 March 2003		Birmingham, United States	
400 m	45.44	Steven Solomon	Australia	23 February 2018	ACC Championships	Clemson, United States	
500 m	1:01.44	Steven Solomon	Australia	1 February 2014	Penn State Invitational	University Park, United States	
600 m	1:17.49 (Note: by official meet and World Athletics source; 1:17.47 by Oceania Athletics source, probably a typo)	Steven Solomon	Australia	3 February 2018	Michigan Power 5 Invitational	Ann Arbor, United States	
800 m	1:45.59	Charlie Hunter	Australia	13 February 2021	Tyson Invitational	Fayetteville, United States	
800 m	1:45.14	Peter Bol	Australia	22 March 2026	World Championships	Toruń, Poland	
1000 m	2:16.95	Jack Anstey	Australia	10 February 2024	BU David Hemery Valentine Invitational	Boston, United States	
1500 m	3:32.35	Oliver Hoare	Australia	13 February 2021	New Balance Indoor Grand Prix	New York City, United States	
Mile	3:47.48	Cameron Myers	Australia	8 February 2025	Millrose Games	New York City, United States	
2000 m	5:03.8 h	John Walker	New Zealand	7 February 1981		Louisville, United States	
3000 m	7:30.38	Ky Robinson	Australia	8 February 2025	Millrose Games	New York City, United States	
3000 m	7:27.57	Cameron Myers	Australia	24 January 2026	New Balance Indoor Grand Prix	Boston, United States	
Two miles	8:05.73	Geordie Beamish	New Zealand	11 February 2024	Millrose Games	New York City, United States	
5000 m	12:59.43	Jack Rayner	Australia	21 February 2025	BU Terrier DMR Challenge	Boston, United States	
50 m hurdles	7.09	Joseph Rodan	Fiji	20 January 2001	Los Angeles Invitational	Los Angeles, United States	
50 m hurdles	6.7 h	Anthony Wright	New Zealand	2 October 1971		Napier, New Zealand	
60 m hurdles	7.56	Chris Douglas	Australia	20 March 2022	World Championships	Belgrade, Serbia	
400 m hurdles	54.94	Wala Gime	Papua New Guinea	25 January 2013	Jack Jennett Invitational	Cedar Falls, United States	
High jump	2.36 m	Hamish Kerr	New Zealand	3 March 2024	World Championships	Glasgow, United Kingdom	
Pole vault	6.06 m	Steven Hooker	Australia	7 February 2009	Boston Indoor Games	Boston, United States	
Long jump	8.25 m	Fabrice Lapierre	Australia	20 March 2016	World Championships	Portland, United States	
Triple jump	17.20 m	Andrew Murphy	Australia	9 March 2001	World Championships	Lisbon, Portugal	
Shot put	22.31 m	Tomas Walsh	New Zealand	3 March 2018	World Championships	Birmingham, United Kingdom	
Shot put	22.31 m	Tomas Walsh	New Zealand	19 March 2022	World Championships	Belgrade, Serbia	
Discus throw	65.60 m	Benn Harradine	Australia	12 March 2011	4th World Indoor Throwing Competition	Växjö, Sweden	
Weight throw	22.25 m	Simon Wardhaugh	Australia	6 December 2008	Boise State Jacksons Open & Combined Events	Nampa, United States	
Heptathlon	6344 pts	Ashley Moloney	Australia	18–19 March 2022	World Championships	Belgrade, Serbia	
Heptathlon	60m / Long jump / Shot put / High jump / 60m H / Pole vault / 1000m; 6.70 / 7.82 m / 13.89 m / 2.02 m / 7.88 / 5.10 m / 2:43.01						
3000 m walk	11:17.66	Quentin Rew	New Zealand	5 January 2014		Sheffield, United Kingdom	
5000 m walk	18:52.20	David Smith	Australia	8 March 1987	World Championships	Indianapolis, United States	
4 × 200 m relay	1:33.25	Farlow; Little; McMahon; Jay Stone	Australia	30 March 2019	World Masters Championships	Toruń, Poland	
4 × 400 m relay	3:08.49	Paul Greene; Mark Garner; Rohan Robinson; Steve Perry	Australia	10 March 1991	World Championships	Seville, Spain	

=== Women ===
Event	Record	Athlete	Nationality	Date	Meet	Place	Ref.	Video
50 m	6.24	Torrie Lewis	Australia	4 February 2025	Czech Indoor Gala	Ostrava, Czech Republic		
55 m	6.70+	Zoe Hobbs	New Zealand	8 February 2025	Millrose Games	New York City, United States		
60 m	7.06	Zoe Hobbs	New Zealand	2 March 2024	World Championships	Glasgow, United Kingdom		
200 m	22.64	Melinda Gainsford	Australia	10 March 1995	World Championships	Barcelona, Spain		
200 m	22.64	Melinda Gainsford	Australia	11 March 1995	World Championships	Barcelona, Spain		
300 m	38.73	Caitlin Sargent	Australia	25 January 2013		Blacksburg, United States		
300 m	37.08 A	Annalies Kalma	New Zealand	16 January 2026	Nevada Invitational & Multi	Reno, United States		
400 m	52.17	Maree Holland	Australia	4 March 1989	World Championships	Budapest, Hungary		
400 m	51.81 A	Annalies Kalma	New Zealand	14 February 2026	Battle Born Classic	Reno, United States		
500 m	1:12.42	Justine Craig	New Zealand	25 January 1986		Fayetteville, United States		
600 m	1:25.84	Erica Sigmont-Fountain	Australia	25 January 2003		Joplin, United States		
800 m	1:59.46	Catriona Bisset	Australia	19 February 2022	Birmingham Indoor Grand Prix	Birmingham, United Kingdom		
1000 m	2:36.96	Toni Hodgkinson	New Zealand	6 February 2000		Roxbury, United States		
1000 m	2:34.71 OT	Jessica Hull	Australia	27 January 2024	UW Invitational	Seattle, United States		
1500 m	4:00.80	Georgia Griffith	Australia	23 March 2025	World Championships	Nanjing, China		
1500 m	3:59.45	Jessica Hull	Australia	22 March 2026	World Championships	Toruń, Poland		
Mile	4:19.03	Jessica Hull	Australia	11 February 2024	Millrose Games	New York City, United States		
2000 m	5:51.29	Kay Gooch	New Zealand	12 March 1994		Indianapolis, United States		
2000 m	5:35.99+	Jessica Hull	Australia	2 March 2024	World Championships	Glasgow, United Kingdom		
2000 m	5:43.82	Heidi See	Australia	7 February 2015	New Balance Indoor Grand Prix	Boston, United States		
2000 m	5:47.62	Lucy van Dalen	New Zealand	8 February 2014	New Balance Indoor Grand Prix	Boston, United States		
2000 m	5:26.68	Jessica Hull	Australia	19 February 2026	Meeting_Hauts-de-France_Pas-de-Calais	Liévin, France		
3000 m	8:24.39	Jessica Hull	Australia	2 March 2024	World Championships	Glasgow, United Kingdom		
Two miles	9:13.94	Kim Smith	New Zealand	26 January 2008	Reebok Indoor Games	Boston, United States		
5000 m	14:39.89	Kim Smith	New Zealand	27 February 2009		New York City, United States		
50 m hurdles	7.2 h	Jan Mack	New Zealand	2 October 1971		Napier, New Zealand		
50 m hurdles	7.2 h	Karen Page	New Zealand	17 February 1979		Logan, United States		
55 m hurdles	7.72	Sharon Jaklofsky-Smith	Australia	4 March 1994		Baton Rouge, United States		
60 m hurdles	7.73	Sally Pearson	Australia	10 March 2012	World Championships	Istanbul, Turkey		
High jump	2.00 m	Eleanor Patterson	Australia	19 March 2022	World Championships	Belgrade, Serbia		
Pole vault	4.80 m	Eliza McCartney	New Zealand	2 March 2024	World Championships	Glasgow, United Kingdom		
Pole vault	4.84 m	Eliza McCartney	New Zealand	10 February 2024	Meeting Hauts-de-France Pas-de-Calais	Liévin, France		
Pole vault	4.91 m	Nina Kennedy	Australia	30 August 2023	Weltklasse Zürich	Zürich, Switzerland		
Long jump	6.81 m	Nicole Boegman	Australia	12 March 1995	World Championships	Barcelona, Spain		
Triple jump	13.31 m	Nicole Mladenis	Australia	5 March 2004	World Championships	Budapest, Hungary		
Shot put	20.98 m	Valerie Adams	New Zealand	28 August 2013	Weltklasse Zürich	Zürich, Switzerland		
Weight throw	22.40 m	Lisa Misipeka	American Samoa	5 February 1999	Millrose Games	New York City, United States		
Pentathlon	4490 pts	Jane Jamieson	Australia	5 March 1999	World Championships	Maebashi, Japan		
Pentathlon	60m H / High jump / Shot put / Long jump / 800m; 8.66 / 1.83 m / 13.94 m / 6.08 m / 2:19.64							
Mile walk	7:01.87	Amanda Gorst	New Zealand	18 January 2006		Findlay, United States		
3000 m walk	11:53.82	Kerry Saxby-Junna	Australia	13 March 1993	World Championships	Toronto, Canada		
4 × 200 m relay	1:42.34 A	C. Mucci; J. Andrew; Boyle; M. Cairns	Australia	18 February 2017		Pocatello, United States		
4 × 400 m relay	3:26.87	Susan Andrews; Tania Van Heer; Tamsyn Manou; Cathy Freeman	Australia	7 March 1999	World Championships	Maebashi, Japan		
