= 2025 Maurie Plant Meet =

- Dates: 29 March 2025
- Host city: Melbourne, Australia
- Venue: Lakeside Stadium
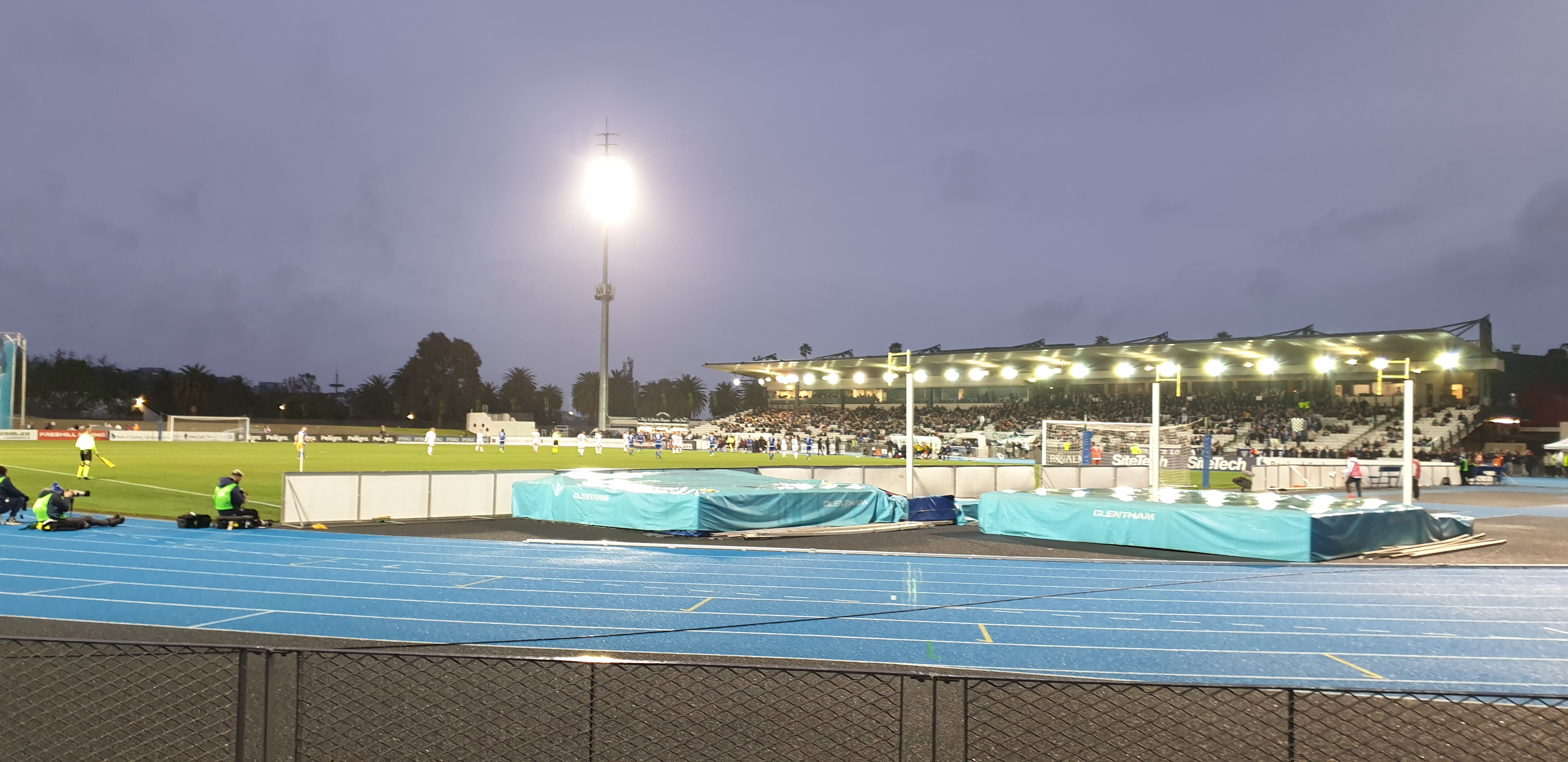
- Level: 2025 World Athletics Continental Tour Gold

The 2025 Maurie Plant Meet was the 34th edition of the annual outdoor track and field meeting in Melbourne. Held on 29 March at Lakeside Stadium, it was the first leg of the 2025 World Athletics Continental Tour Gold – the second-highest level international track and field circuit behind the 2025 Diamond League.

== Results ==
=== Men's ===
200 metres
Place	Athlete	Nation	Time	Notes
1st place, gold medalist(s)	Lachlan Kennedy	Australia	20.26	PB
2nd place, silver medalist(s)	Gout Gout	Australia	20.30	SB
3rd place, bronze medalist(s)	Calab Law	Australia	20.78	
4	Kalinga Kumarage	Sri Lanka	20.89	
5	Aidan Murphy	Australia	20.98	
6	Yudai Nishi	Japan	21.00	SB
7	Koki Ueyama	Japan	21.01	SB
8	Christopher Ius	Australia	21.06	
			Wind: (+0.4 m/s)	

400 metres
Place	Athlete	Nation	Time	Notes
1st place, gold medalist(s)	Bayapo Ndori	Botswana	45.14	
2nd place, silver medalist(s)	Letsile Tebogo	Botswana	45.26	SB
3rd place, bronze medalist(s)	Leungo Scotch	Botswana	45.60	
4	Cooper Sherman	Australia	45.74	
5	Luke Van Ratingen	Australia	45.79	
6	Terrell Thorne	Australia	46.20	
7	Thomas Reynolds	Australia	46.33	
8	Victor Ntweng	Botswana	46.74	

1500 metres
Place	Athlete	Nation	Time	Notes
1st place, gold medalist(s)	Cameron Myers	Australia	3:34.98	SB
2nd place, silver medalist(s)	Adam Spencer	Australia	3:35.52	SB
3rd place, bronze medalist(s)	Jude Thomas	Australia	3:36.48 [.478]	PB
3rd place, bronze medalist(s)	Olli Hoare	Australia	3:36.48 [.478]	SB
5	Sam Tanner	New Zealand	3:36.67	SB
6	Peter Bol	Australia	3:37.29	SB
7	Sam Ruthe	New Zealand	3:40.12	PB
8	Jack Anstey	Australia	3:40.38	SB
9	Callum Davies	Australia	3:40.75	SB
10	Matthew Ramsden	Australia	3:42.19	SB
11	William Lewis	Australia	3:43.16	
12	Lucas Chis	Australia	3:43.70	PB
13	Ryoji Tatezawa	Japan	3:48.24	
—	Tom Forster	Australia	DNF	PM

5000 metres
Place	Athlete	Nation	Time	Notes
1st place, gold medalist(s)	Ky Robinson	Australia	13:13.17	PB
2nd place, silver medalist(s)	Seth O'Donnell	Australia	13:14.57	PB
3rd place, bronze medalist(s)	Jack Bruce	Australia	13:23.48	PB
4	Gideon Rono	Kenya	13:24.30	SB
5	Emmanuel Kiplagat	Kenya	13:24.85	SB
6	Rui Suzuki	Japan	13:25.59	PB
7	Brian Fay	Ireland	13:25.63	SB
8	Sammuel Clifford	Australia	13:25.78	PB
9	Masaya Tsurukawa	Japan	13:26.23	SB
10	Isaac Heyne	Australia	13:28.55	PB
11	Sam Parsons	Germany	13:32.98	SB
12	James Hansen	Australia	13:34.08	SB
13	Matthew Clarke	Australia	13:34.55	PB
14	Shunsuke Yoshii	Japan	13:55.79	SB
15	Oliver Chignell	New Zealand	13:59.09	
16	Tetsu Sasaki	Japan	13:59.73	SB
17	Tomonori Yamaguchi	Japan	14:06.17	SB
18	Joshua Phillips	Australia	14:12.35	
—	Max Shervington	Australia	DNF	PM
—	Andrew Waring	Australia	DNF	PM

High jump
Place	Athlete	Nation	Height	Notes
1st place, gold medalist(s)	Tomohiro Shinno	Japan	2.20 m	=SB
2nd place, silver medalist(s)	Roman Anastasios	Australia	2.20 m	=SB
3rd place, bronze medalist(s)	Brandon Starc	Australia	2.20 m	SB
4	Yual Reath	Australia	2.16 m	SB
5	Naoto Hasegawa	Japan	2.16 m	SB
6	Takashi Eto	Japan	2.12 m	SB
7	Joel Baden	Australia	2.12 m	SB
8	Zane Patterson	Australia	2.12 m	
9	Jonathan Titmarsh	Australia	2.07 m	

Triple jump
Place	Athlete	Nation	Distance	Notes
1st place, gold medalist(s)	Connor Murphy	Australia	16.23 m (−1.3 m/s)	
2nd place, silver medalist(s)	Shemaiah James	Australia	16.04 m (−0.3 m/s)	SB
3rd place, bronze medalist(s)	Tetteh Anang	Australia	15.68 m (−0.8 m/s)	
4	Yuki Yamashita	Japan	15.67 m (−1.8 m/s)	SB
5	Liam Glew	Australia	15.59 m (+0.9 m/s)	
6	Awan Akuen	Australia	15.50 m (−0.9 m/s)	
7	Aiden Hinson	Australia	15.29 m (+1.0 m/s)	
8	Alex Epitropakis	Australia	15.28 m (+0.6 m/s)	
9	Daniel Okerenyang	Australia	15.06 m (−1.4 m/s)	
10	Julian Konle	Australia	14.73 m (−1.1 m/s)	

Discus throw
Place	Athlete	Nation	Distance	Notes
1st place, gold medalist(s)	Matthew Denny	Australia	68.17 m	MR, SB
2nd place, silver medalist(s)	Lawrence Okoye	Great Britain	64.60 m	
3rd place, bronze medalist(s)	Connor Bell	New Zealand	62.14 m	SB
4	Irfan Shamsuddin	Malaysia	59.09 m	
5	Ethan Ayodele	Australia	56.36 m	
6	Etienne Rousseau	Australia	55.52 m	
7	Tom Reux	France	54.39 m	
8	Yuji Tsutsumi	Japan	53.62 m	

=== Women's ===
200 metres
Place	Athlete	Nation	Time	Notes
1st place, gold medalist(s)	Kristie Edwards	Australia	23.18	
2nd place, silver medalist(s)	Jessica Milat	Australia	23.36	
3rd place, bronze medalist(s)	Lakara Stallan	Australia	23.39	
4	Mia Gross	Australia	23.43	
5	Torrie Lewis	Australia	23.60	
6	Miranda Coetzee	South Africa	23.67	
7	Carla Bull	Australia	23.78	
8	Nyajima Jock	Australia	23.99	
			Wind: (+0.7 m/s)	

1500 metres
Place	Athlete	Nation	Time	Notes
1st place, gold medalist(s)	Claudia Hollingsworth	Australia	4:05.97	MR, SB
2nd place, silver medalist(s)	Sarah Billings	Australia	4:06.37	SB
3rd place, bronze medalist(s)	Linden Hall	Australia	4:06.89	SB
4	Abbey Caldwell	Australia	4:06.91	SB
5	Elsabet Amare	Ethiopia	4:08.10	PB
6	Jaylah Hancock-Cameron	Australia	4:09.00	
7	Eleanor Fulton	United States	4:10.21	SB
8	Sophie O'Sullivan	Ireland	4:12.91	
9	Laura Nagel	New Zealand	4:13.06	
10	Izzy Thornton-Bott	Australia	4:14.88	SB
11	Tomoka Kimura	Japan	4:19.97	
12	Yume Goto	Japan	4:31.21	SB
—	Leah Simpson	Australia	DNF	PM

3000 metres
Place	Athlete	Nation	Time	Notes
1st place, gold medalist(s)	Fentaye Belayneh	Ethiopia	8:34.30	MR, PB
2nd place, silver medalist(s)	Georgia Griffith	Australia	8:35.10	SB
3rd place, bronze medalist(s)	Senayet Getachew	Ethiopia	8:35.26	PB
4	Maudie Skyring	Australia	8:42.82	PB
5	Rose Davies	Australia	8:44.25	SB
6	Cara Feain-Ryan	Australia	8:50.69	PB
7	Natalie Rule	Australia	8:51.06	PB
8	Amy Robinson	Australia	8:53.54	PB
9	Izzi Batt-Doyle	Australia	8:53.58	SB
10	Jenny Blundell	Australia	9:00.90	SB
11	Klara Dess	Australia	9:02.40	PB
12	Taylor Werner	United States	9:06.74	SB
13	Nagisa Shimotabira	Japan	9:07.01	SB
14	Zoe Melhuish	Australia	9:14.87	PB
—	Olivia Vareille	Great Britain	DNF	PM

100 metres hurdles
Place	Athlete	Nation	Time	Notes
1st place, gold medalist(s)	Yumi Tanaka	Japan	13.11	SB
2nd place, silver medalist(s)	Chisato Kiyoyama	Japan	13.19	
3rd place, bronze medalist(s)	Hitomi Nakajima	Japan	13.33	
4	Emily Britton	Australia	13.34	
5	Delta Amidzovski	Australia	13.46	
6	Michelle Jenneke	Australia	13.59	SB
7	Adrine Monagi	Papua New Guinea	13.85	
8	Daniela Roman	Australia	13.92	
			Wind: (+0.5 m/s)	

High jump
Place	Athlete	Nation	Height	Notes
1st place, gold medalist(s)	Eleanor Patterson	Australia	1.94 m	SB
2nd place, silver medalist(s)	Nagisa Takahashi	Japan	1.86 m	SB
3rd place, bronze medalist(s)	Erin Shaw	Australia	1.82 m	SB
3rd place, bronze medalist(s)	Emily Whelan	Australia	1.82 m	
5	Izobelle Louison-Roe	Australia	1.82 m	
6	Alexandra Harrison	Australia	1.78 m	
7	Imogen Skeleton	New Zealand	1.78 m	
8	Emily Borthwick	Great Britain	1.78 m	=SB

Hammer throw
Place	Athlete	Nation	Distance	Notes
1st place, gold medalist(s)	Jillian Shippee	United States	71.26 m	MR, SB
2nd place, silver medalist(s)	Rose Loga	France	69.05 m	
3rd place, bronze medalist(s)	Lauren Bruce	New Zealand	68.87 m	
4	Stephanie Ratcliffe	Australia	68.10 m	SB
5	Lara Roberts	Australia	66.47 m	SB
6	Iryna Klymets	Ukraine	66.04 m	
7	Elísabet Rut Rúnarsdóttir	Iceland	66.01 m	
8	Jillian Weir	Canada	63.56 m	SB
9	Alexandria Maples	New Zealand	58.57 m	

Javelin throw
Place	Athlete	Nation	Distance	Notes
1st place, gold medalist(s)	Lianna Davidson	Australia	61.06 m	
2nd place, silver medalist(s)	Mackenzie Little	Australia	59.66 m	
3rd place, bronze medalist(s)	Momone Ueda	Japan	57.65 m	
4	Sae Takemoto	Japan	56.91 m	
5	Tori Moorby	New Zealand	55.91 m	
6	Mia Gordon	Australia	53.29 m	

== See also ==
- 2025 World Athletics Continental Tour
