= 2024 Maurie Plant Meet =

- Dates: 15 February 2024
- Host city: Melbourne, Australia
- Venue: Lakeside Stadium
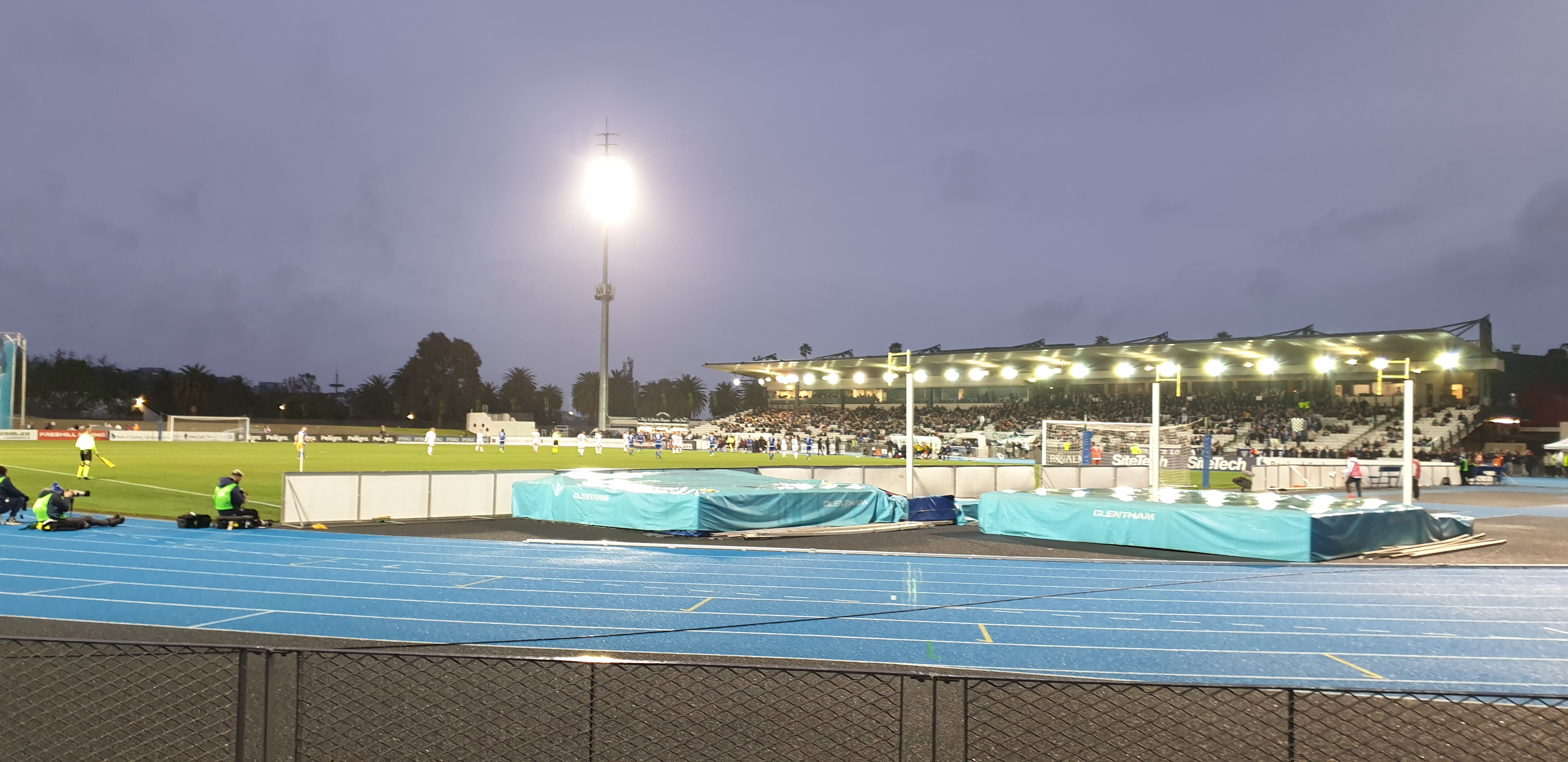
- Level: 2024 World Athletics Continental Tour Gold

The 2024 Maurie Plant Meet was the 34th edition of the annual outdoor track and field meeting in Melbourne. Held on 15 February at Lakeside Stadium, it was the first leg of the 2024 World Athletics Continental Tour Gold – the second-highest level international track and field circuit behind the 2024 Diamond League.

The meeting was highlighted by Stewart McSweyn winning the John Landy namesake mile, beating 2022 world champion Jake Wightman in the process.

== Results ==
=== Men's ===
200 metres
Place	Athlete	Nation	Time	Notes
1st place, gold medalist(s)	Rohan Browning	Australia	20.80	SB
2nd place, silver medalist(s)	Towa Uzawa	Japan	21.07	SB
3rd place, bronze medalist(s)	Calab Law	Australia	21.15	
4	Christopher Ius	Australia	21.32	
5	Gout Gout	Australia	21.39	
6	Jacob Despard	Australia	21.60	
7	Cooper Sherman	Australia	21.73	
—	Yudai Nishi	Japan	DQ	TR16.8
			Wind: (−1.5 m/s)	

Mile
Place	Athlete	Nation	Time	Notes
1st place, gold medalist(s)	Stewart McSweyn	Australia	3:52.00	SB
2nd place, silver medalist(s)	Jake Wightman	Great Britain	3:52.11	SB
3rd place, bronze medalist(s)	Cameron Myers	Australia	3:52.44	PB
4	Sam Tanner	New Zealand	3:53.16	SB
5	Jesse Hunt	Australia	3:53.78	PB
6	Jye Edwards	Australia	3:55.20	SB
7	Thomas Keen	Great Britain	3:58.02	SB
8	Ryōji Tatezawa	Japan	3:59.87	PB
9	Luke Burrows	Australia	4:02.28	PB
10	Paul Robinson	Ireland	4:02.92	SB
11	Sam Blake	Australia	4:05.07	SB
12	Yohanes Asmare	Ethiopia	4:06.56	PB
13	Peyton Craig	Australia	4:12.05	PB
—	Masato Yokota	Japan	DNF	PM
—	Connor Whiteley	Australia	DNF	PM

5000 metres
Place	Athlete	Nation	Time	Notes
1st place, gold medalist(s)	Jack Rayner	Australia	13:16.34	SB
2nd place, silver medalist(s)	Matthew Ramsden	Australia	13:17.22	SB
3rd place, bronze medalist(s)	Robin Hendrix	Belgium	13:19.97	SB
4	Sam McEntee	Australia	13:31.64	SB
5	Jude Thomas	Australia	13:33.60	PB
6	Haftu Strintzos	Australia	13:34.41	PB
7	Joshua Phillips	Australia	13:34.80	PB
8	Yuta Bando	Japan	13:38.72	SB
9	Edward Marks	Australia	13:39.57	PB
10	James Hansen	Australia	13:42.68	SB
11	Zachary Facioni	Australia	13:45.52	SB
12	Maximilian Thorwirth	Germany	13:50.54	SB
13	Sam Clifford	Australia	13:51.10	PB
14	Andre Waring	Australia	13:54.19	SB
15	Hiroki Matsueda	Japan	14:10.57	SB
—	Callum Davies	Australia	DNF	
—	Rorey Hunter	Australia	DNF	
—	Ryan Gregson	Australia	DNF	PM
—	Brett Robinson	Australia	DNF	PM

110 metres hurdles
Place	Athlete	Nation	Time	Notes
1st place, gold medalist(s)	Tayleb Willis	Australia	13.79	=PB
2nd place, silver medalist(s)	Jacob McCorry	Australia	13.84	SB
3rd place, bronze medalist(s)	Mitchell Lightfoot	Australia	13.97	SB
4	Joshua Hawkins	New Zealand	14.00	SB
5	Sam Hurwood	Australia	14.09	SB
6	Nicholas Andrews	Australia	14.15	PB
			Wind: (±0.0 m/s)	

High jump
Place	Athlete	Nation	Height	Notes
1st place, gold medalist(s)	Hamish Kerr	New Zealand	2.25 m	
2nd place, silver medalist(s)	Roman Anastasios	Australia	2.17 m	
3rd place, bronze medalist(s)	Tomohiro Shinno	Australia	2.17 m	
3rd place, bronze medalist(s)	Naoto Hasegawa	Japan	2.17 m	SB
5	Tomohiro Shinno	Japan	2.13 m	SB
6	Joel Baden	Australia	2.09 m	
7	Mitchell Hatfield	Australia	2.04 m	
7	Paulo Conceição	Portugal	2.04 m	
7	Ryo Sato	Japan	2.04 m	SB

Long jump
Place	Athlete	Nation	Distance	Notes
1st place, gold medalist(s)	Chris Mitrevski	Australia	7.96 m (+2.1 m/s)	
2nd place, silver medalist(s)	Darcy Roper	Australia	7.86 m (+2.5 m/s)	
3rd place, bronze medalist(s)	Koki Fujihara	Japan	7.78 m (+1.0 m/s)	SB
4	Liam Adcock	Australia	7.70 m (+1.6 m/s)	SB
5	Henry Frayne	Australia	7.63 m (+0.3 m/s)	
6	Jalen Rucker	Australia	7.58 m (+1.4 m/s)	
7	Hibiki Tsuha	Japan	7.49 m (+1.3 m/s)	SB
8	Shotaro Shiroyama	Japan	7.49 m (+1.1 m/s)	SB
Best wind-legal performances
	Darcy Roper	Australia	7.84 m (+0.8 m/s)	SB
	Chris Mitrevski	Australia	7.65 m (+1.1 m/s)	SB

Discus throw
Place	Athlete	Nation	Distance	Notes
1st place, gold medalist(s)	Connor Bell	New Zealand	65.18 m	
2nd place, silver medalist(s)	Matthew Denny	Australia	65.09 m	
3rd place, bronze medalist(s)	Lawrence Okoye	Great Britain	60.37 m	
4	Nicholas Percy	Great Britain	59.51 m	
5	Masateru Yugami	Japan	58.25 m	
6	Robbie Zorawar Otal	United States	56.50 m	SB
7	Irfan Shamsuddin	Malaysia	56.20 m	
8	Darcy Miller	Australia	51.02 m	

=== Women's ===
100 metres
Place	Athlete	Nation	Time	Notes
1st place, gold medalist(s)	Zoe Hobbs	New Zealand	11.34	
2nd place, silver medalist(s)	Torrie Lewis	Australia	11.40	
3rd place, bronze medalist(s)	Bree Masters	Australia	11.58	
4	Ella Connolly	Australia	11.59	
5	Ebony Lane	Australia	11.65	
6	Mia Gross	Australia	11.70	
7	Chelsea Scolyer	Australia	11.72	
8	Olivia Dodds	Australia	11.85	
			Wind: (−1.2 m/s)	

800 metres
Place	Athlete	Nation	Time	Notes
1st place, gold medalist(s)	Claudia Hollingsworth	Australia	1:59.81	PB
2nd place, silver medalist(s)	Abbey Caldwell	Australia	2:00.54	SB
3rd place, bronze medalist(s)	Catriona Bisset	Australia	2:01.41	SB
4	Linden Hall	Australia	2:02.30	SB
5	Brooke Feldmeier	United States	2:02.98	SB
6	Imogen Barrett	Australia	2:03.01	
7	Georgia Griffith	Australia	2:03.17	SB
8	Jaylah Hancock-Cameron	Australia	2:04.15	
9	Morgan Mitchell	Australia	2:04.61	
10	Bendere Oboya	Australia	2:05.48	
—	Helen Pretorius	Australia	DNF	PM

5000 metres
Place	Athlete	Nation	Time	Notes
1st place, gold medalist(s)	Rose Davies	Australia	14:57.54	MR
2nd place, silver medalist(s)	Isobel Batt-Doyle	Australia	14:59.18	PB
3rd place, bronze medalist(s)	Aynadis Mebratu	Ethiopia	15:04.84	SB
4	Holly Campbell	Australia	15:10.11	PB
5	Genevieve Gregson	Australia	15:22.08	SB
6	Jenny Blundell	Australia	15:24.27	SB
7	Maudie Skyring	Australia	15:25.24	PB
8	Leanne Pompeani	Australia	15:28.14	SB
9	Jodie McCann	Ireland	15:35.04	PB
10	Sarah Billings	Australia	15:41.41	PB
11	Stella Radford	Australia	15:41.88	PB
12	Natalie Rule	Australia	15:42.60	SB
13	Cara Feain-Ryan	Australia	15:44.69	PB
14	Rebekah Greene	New Zealand	15:47.92	PB
15	Laura Nagel	New Zealand	15:51.41	SB
16	Melissa Duncan	Australia	15:52.30	SB
17	Tomoka Kimura	Japan	15:55.45	SB
18	Caitlin Adams	Australia	16:03.71	SB
19	Eloise Wellings	Australia	16:14.07	SB
—	Emma Philippe	Australia	DNF	PM
—	Sora Shinozakura	Japan	DNF	PM

100 metres hurdles
Place	Athlete	Nation	Time	Notes
1st place, gold medalist(s)	Liz Clay	Australia	13.02	SB
2nd place, silver medalist(s)	Michelle Jenneke	Australia	13.12	SB
3rd place, bronze medalist(s)	Queen Claye	United States	13.16	SB
4	Michelle Harrison	Canada	13.18	SB
5	Yumi Tanaka	Japan	13.19	SB
6	Danielle Shaw	Australia	13.26	
7	Mako Fukube	Japan	13.28	SB
8	Hannah Jones	Australia	13.36	SB
—	Victoria Rausch	Luxembourg	DNF	
			Wind: (+0.3 m/s)	

High jump
Place	Athlete	Nation	Height	Notes
1st place, gold medalist(s)	Nicola Olyslagers	Australia	1.99 m	MR
2nd place, silver medalist(s)	Erin Shaw	Australia	1.84 m	SB
3rd place, bronze medalist(s)	Nagisa Takahashi	Japan	1.80 m	SB
4	Alexandra Harrison	Australia	1.80 m	
4	Keeley O'Hagan	New Zealand	1.80 m	
6	Camryn Newton-Smith	Australia	1.76 m	SB
7	Emily Whelan	Australia	1.71 m	

Discus throw
Place	Athlete	Nation	Distance	Notes
1st place, gold medalist(s)	Daisy Osakue	Italy	61.57 m	SB
2nd place, silver medalist(s)	Jade Lally	England	57.86 m	SB
3rd place, bronze medalist(s)	Samantha Hall	Jamaica	57.27 m	
4	Ashley Anumba	Nigeria	55.10 m	SB
5	Nora Monie	Cameroon	54.51 m	
6	Maki Saito	Japan	53.15 m	SB
7	Taryn Gollshewsky	Australia	53.03 m	

Javelin throw
Place	Athlete	Nation	Distance	Notes
1st place, gold medalist(s)	Kathryn Mitchell	Australia	62.12 m	SB
2nd place, silver medalist(s)	Tori Peeters	New Zealand	57.35 m	SB
3rd place, bronze medalist(s)	Momone Ueda	Japan	57.15 m	SB
4	Yuka Sato	Japan	56.30 m	SB
5	Lianna Davidson	Australia	56.09 m	SB
6	Sae Takemoto	Japan	54.84 m	SB
7	Kelsey-Lee Barber	Australia	54.59 m	SB
8	Mahiro Osa	Japan	52.22 m	SB
9	Mackenzie Mielczarek	Australia	51.67 m	

=== Mixed ===
4x400 metres
Place	Athletes	Nation	Time	Notes
1st place, gold medalist(s)	Lawson Power; Jessie Andrew; Thomas Reynolds; Anna Plessinger	Australia	3:21.26	PB
2nd place, silver medalist(s)	Harrison Hunt; Jemma Pollard; John Gikas; Marli Wilkinson	Australia	3:21.28	SB
3rd place, bronze medalist(s)	Nicholas Donaldson; Ellie Beer; Reece Holder; Mikeala Selaidinakos	Australia	3:22.24	SB
4	Jordan Gilbert; Sophia Gregorevic; Caleb Kilpatrick; Layla Watson	Australia	3:27.60	PB, U20
5	Daniel Minz; Declyn Tanner; Hugo Hanak; Ella Tobin	Australia	3:29.03	PB
6	Benjamin Aliel; Edna Boafob; William Peka; Harihi Naime	Papua New Guinea	3:48.99	SB

== See also ==
- 2024 World Athletics Continental Tour
