= Carla Bull =

Australian sprinter (born 2002)

Personal information
- Born: 27 June 2002 (age 24)
- Height: 1.83 m (6 ft 0 in)

Sport
- Sport: Athletics
- Event: Sprint

Achievements and titles
- Personal bests: 100 m: 11.68 s (2024); 200 m: 23.00 s (2025); 400 m: 52.85 s (2025)
Medal record
Women's athletics
Representing Australia
World Relays
Silver medal – second place	2025 Guangzhou	Mixed 4 × 400 m relay

Carla Bull (born 27 June 2002) is an Australian sprinter. She helped set an Oceania record in the Mixed 4 × 400 metres relay at the 2025 World Athletics Relays, as part of an Australian silver medal winning team.

== Early life ==
From Hervey Bay in Queensland, she attended Fraser Coast Anglican College. Growing up, she was a member of Hervey Bay Surf Life Saving Club.

== Career ==
Bull moved from her hometown of Hervey Bay to the Gold Coast in 2020 to pursue physiotherapy studies and train under sprint coach Brett Robinson. She won Stawell Gift handicapped race in April 2022, in a time of 13.77 seconds from Clare De Salis and backmarker Mia Gross.

She was selected for the Australian relay pool for the 2025 World Athletics Relays in China in May 2025. On the first day she ran as part of the Mixed 4 × 400 metres relay which finished in the top-two in their heat to secure qualification for the 2025 World Championships. On the second day, she ran as part of the Australian Mixed 4x400 metres relay team which finished second overall behind the United States in 3:12.20, setting a new Oceania record alongside Terrell Thorne, Ellie Beer and Luke van Ratingen. On the same evening she ran as a member of Australia’s Mixed 4 × 100 m quartet alongside Olivia Dodds, Connor Bond and Josiah John who had a fourth-place finish in a time of 41.22 in the inaugural final of the event at the Championships.

She was selected for the Australian team for the 2025 World Athletics Championships in Tokyo, Japan.

On 11 April 2026, she was a finalist over 400 metres at the 2026 Australian Athletics Championships. She was selected for the Australian team to compete at the 2026 World Athletics Relays in Gaborone, Botswana.
