= Matthew Hunt (hurdler) =

Australian athlete

Personal information
- Nationality: Australian
- Born: 23 November 2006 (age 19)

Sport
- Sport: Track and Field
- Event: 100 metres hurdles

Achievements and titles
- Personal best: 400m hurdles 49.33 (2026)
Medal record
Men's athletics
Representing Australia
World Relays
Bronze medal – third place	2026 Gaborone	4×400 m relay
Oceania Championships
Gold medal – first place	2026 Darwin	400m hurdles
Commonwealth Youth Games
Bronze medal – third place	2023 Port of Spain	Mixed relay

Matthew Hunt (born 23 November 2006) is an Australian hurdler. He won the Australian Athletics Championships in 2026 in the 400 metres hurdles.

== Biography ==
A member of UTS Norths athletics club, Hunt started in athletics when he was 6 years old. He won the U17 400 metres hurdles at the 2022 Australian All Schools Championships. The following year, Hunt placed second in the U18 400 metres hurdles at the 2023 Australian Athletics Championships having won the 400m hurdles at the 2023 NSW Championships. Competing for Australia in Trinidad and Tobbago at the 2023 Commonwealth Youth Games he was a finalist in the 400m hurdles, marginally missing out on a podium position by one-hundredth of a second in 52.37 seconds, after running under protest after falsely being attributed with a false start. He later won a bronze medal in the mixed 4x400m relay at the Games.

In April 2024, he won the Australian U20 title over 400m hurdles in Adelaide and was selected to represent Australia at the 2024 World Athletics U20 Championships in Lima, Peru. He retained the national U20 title the following year in Perth.

In Canberra in January 2026, Hunt broke the 50-second barrier in the 400m hurdles with a time of 49.95 at the Capital Athletics Open and Under 20 Championships. In March 2026, Hunt ran a personal best 49.48 seconds to win the 400 metres hurdles at the Adelaide Invitational, to move into the top-ten on the Australian all-time list. Hunt won the Australian Athletics Championships on 12 April 2026 in the 400 metres hurdles, running 49.37 seconds to win ahead of Kyle Bennett and Ashley Moloney. He was selected for the Australian team to compete at the 2026 World Athletics Relays in Gaborone, Botswana. On the opening day he was part of the Australian men's 4 x 400 metres relay team alongside Luke van Ratingen, Reece Holder, and Aidan Murphy who set a new Oceania record of 2:57.30 breaking the previous best that had stood since 1984. The following day, he switched to run in the final of the mixed 4 x 400 m relay. Later that month, he ran a personal best of 49.33 seconds in the qualifying round of the 400 m hurdles at the 2026 Oceania Athletics Championships in Darwin, prior to winning the gold medal the following day. He competed in the 400 metres hurdles at the 2026 Commonwealth Games in Glasgow, Scotland.

== Personal life ==
His brother Thomas Hunt is also an athlete and Australia national champion in the 400 metres hurdles.
