= Tom Reynolds (sprinter) =

Australian sprinter (born 2004)

Thomas Reynolds
Personal information
- Born: 5 September 2004 (age 22)

Sport
- Country: Australia
- Sport: Athletics
- Event: Sprint

Achievements and titles
- Personal bests: 200 m: 21.19 (Canberra, 2024); 400m: 45.13 (Melbourne, 2026)
Medal record
Men's athletics
Representing Australia
World Relays
Bronze medal – third place	2026 Gaborone	4×400 m relay
Oceania Championships
Silver medal – second place	2026 Darwin	400 m

Thomas “Tom” Reynolds (born 5 September 2004) is an Australian sprinter who primarily competes over 400 metres.

== Biography ==
He competed for Australia at the 2022 World Athletics U20 Championships in Cali, Colombia.

He ran as part of the Australian 4x400m relay team at the 2024 World Relays Championships in Nassau, Bahamas in May 2024.

In April 2025, he placed fourth over 400 metres at the Australian Athletics Championships in a time of 46.13 seconds. He was selected for the Australian relay pool for the 2025 World Athletics Relays in China in May 2025. He competed at the event as part of the men's 4 x 400 metres relay, on the second day he was part of the team alongside Reece Holder, Aidan Murphy and Cooper Sherman which ran a time of 2:59.73 to secure the nation a place at the upcoming world championships, and just 0.03sec outside the 41-year-old Australian record.

He competed in the individual 400 metres at the 2025 Summer World University Games in Bochum, Germany, but was disqualified after a false start. He was subsequently selected for the relay pool by the Australian team for the 2025 World Athletics Championships in Tokyo, Japan, running on the opening day in the mixed 4 × 400 metres relay. He also ran in the men's 4 x 400 metres relay in which the Australian team ran a national record before being disqualified for an illegal handover.

In Canberra in January 2026, he ran a personal best 45.17 seconds for the 400 metres to place second to Cooper Sherman at the Capital Athletics Open and Under 20 Championships. In March, he lowered his best to 45.13 seconds at the Maurie Plant Meet. On 11 April 2026, he was a finalist over 400 metres at the 2026 Australian Athletics Championships, placing third in 45.69 seconds. He was selected for the Australian team to compete at the 2026 World Athletics Relays in Gaborone, Botswana. He was part of the Australian mixed 4 x 400 metres relay team which set an Oceanian record of 3:10.57 on the opening day. The following day he ran in the final of the men's 4 x 400 m relay as the Australian team ran a national record 2:55.20 to win the bronze medal and move to sixth on the world all-time list. Later that month, he won the silver medal over 400 m at the 2026 Oceania Athletics Championships, finishing behind Aidan Murphy and ahead of Luke Van Ratingen in an Australian sweep of the medals. In July 2026, he placed fifth overall in the final of the 400 metres at the 2026 Commonwealth Games in Glasgow, Scotland.

== Personal life ==
He studies for a Bachelor of Health Science degree at La Trobe University in Melbourne.
