= Liu Kai (sprinter) =

Chinese sprinter (born 2006)

Personal information
- Born: 10 May 2006 (age 20)

Sport
- Sport: Athletics
- Event: Sprint

Achievements and titles
- Personal bests: 400m: 46.10 (2025) NR

Liu Kai (born 10 May 2006) is a Chinese sprinter who holds the Chinese national record for the 400 metres. He became Chinese national champion over 400 metres both outdoors and indoors in 2025, and competed at the 2025 World Athletics Championships.

== Biography ==
He is from Shandong. In March 2025, he won the 400 metres title at the Chinese Indoor Championships in Jinan. In August 2025, he ran a personal best and national record 45.06 seconds for the 400 metres in the preliminary round of the Chinese athletics championships, prior to winning the final in 45.63 seconds. The new national record surpassed the previous mark set by Guo Zhongze. The following month, he was part of the Chinese 4 × 400 metres relay team which set a new Chinese national record at the 2025 World Athletics Championships in Tokyo, Japan. During the run, he recorded a split time of 44.87 seconds for his 400 m leg and came after he also recorded a split time 45.30 seconds in the third leg of the mixed 4 x 400 metres relay at the championships. In November, he ran 45.77 seconds for the 400 metres to win Chinese National Games gold medal for the first time.

In May 2026, he ran for China at the 2026 World Athletics Relays in the men's 4 × 400 metres relay in Gaborone, Botswana.
