= 2025 World Athletics Relays – Mixed 4 × 400 metres relay =

Mixed 4 × 400 metres relay at the 2025 World Athletics Relays
- Venue: Tianhe Stadium, Guangzhou
- Dates: 10 May (heats); 11 May (repechage round & final)
- Winning time: 3:09.54 CR

Medalists
gold medal	Chris Robinson; Courtney Okolo; Johnnie Blockburger; Lynna Irby-Jackson	United States
silver medal	Luke van Ratingen; Ellie Beer; Terrell Thorne; Carla Bull; Cooper Sherman*; Reece Holder*; Alanah Yukich*	Australia
bronze medal	David Kapirante; Mercy Chebet; Brian Tinega; Mercy Oketch; Kevin Kipkorir*	Kenya

The mixed 4 × 400 metres relay at the 2025 World Athletics Relays was held at the Tianhe Stadium in Guangzhou, China on 10 and 11 May.

The event served as a qualifying event for the 2025 World Athletics Championships, with the top 14 teams securing qualification to the World Championships.

== Records ==
Prior to the competition, the records were as follows:

Record	Team	Time	Location	Date
World record	United States (Vernon Norwood, Shamier Little, Bryce Deadmon, Kaylyn Brown)	3:07.41	Saint-Denis, France	2 August 2024
Championships record	United States (Matthew Boling, Lynna Irby-Jackson, Willington Wright, Kendall Ellis)	3:10.73	(The Bahamas) Nassau, Bahamas	5 May 2024
2025 World Leading	Colombia (Nicolás Salinas, Lina Licona, Daniel Balanta, Evelis Aguilar)	3:14.42	Bogotá, Colombia	5 April 2025

== Qualification ==
On 10 November 2024, World Athletics announced the qualification system for the championships. The top 16 teams in each event at the 2024 Summer Olympic Games qualify for entry to the championships. The host country China will enter with one team in each event, regardless of any entry conditions. The remaining teams (up to 32 in total per event) will be determined through the top lists in the qualification period (1 January 2024 to 13 April 2025).

== Program ==
All times are local (UTC+8).

Date	Time	Round
10 May 2025	19:22	Heats
11 May 2025	19:13	Repechage round
11 May 2025	21:03	Final

== Results ==
=== Heats (World Championships Qualifying Round 1) ===
The heats were held on 10 May 2025, starting at 19:22 (UTC+8) in the evening. Qualification: First 2 of each heat (WQ) plus 2 fastest times (Wq) qualify to the 2025 World Athletics Championships and World Athletics Relays Final.

==== Heat 1 ====
Rank	Lane	Nation	Competitors	Time	Notes
1	5	Belgium	Jonathan Sacoor, Imke Vervaet, Daniel Segers, Helena Ponette	3:11.83	WQ, WL
2	4	Australia	Cooper Sherman, Ellie Beer, Reece Holder, Alanah Yukich	3:12.34	WQ, AR
3	7	Kenya	Kevin Kipkorir, Mercy Chebet, David Sanayek Kapirante, Mercy Oketch	3:13.41	Wq, SB
4	8	Italy	Lapo Bianciardi, Rebecca Borga, Matteo Raimondi, Virginia Troiani	3:15.64	SB
5	3	Uganda	Godfrey Chanwengo, Maureen Banura, Haron Adoli, Leni Shida	3:16.59	NR
6	6	Jamaica	Demar Francis, Niesha Burgher, Delano Kennedy, Kelly-Ann Beckford	3:18.83	SB
7	9	Botswana	Thabang Charles Monngathipa, Tlhomphang Basele, Kabo David Rankgwe, Motlatsi Ranthe	3:19.91	SB

==== Heat 2 ====
Rank	Lane	Nation	Competitors	Time	Notes
1	7	United States	Johnnie Blockburger, Courtney Okolo, Chris Robinson, Lynna Irby-Jackson	3:11.37	WQ, WL
2	6	Ireland	Conor Kelly, Rhasidat Adeleke, Cillin Greene, Sharlene Mawdsley	3:12.56	WQ, SB
3	5	Poland	Maksymilian Szwed, Natalia Bukowiecka, Kajetan Duszyński, Justyna Święty-Ersetic	3:12.70	Wq, SB
4	8	Germany	Manuel Sanders, Annkathrin Hoven, Emil Agyekum, Jana Lakner	3:14.42	SB
5	4	Switzerland	Ricky Petrucciani, Lena Wernli, Vincent Gendre, Annina Fahr	3:16.27	SB
6	3	China	Dexiang Yu, Mo Jiadie, Chiyu Zheng, Yinglan Liu	3:19.05	SB
7	9	Brazil	Jádson Lima, Érica Cavalheiro, Elias Oliveira, Rita de Cassia Ferreira	3:21.45	

==== Heat 3 ====
Rank	Lane	Nation	Competitors	Time	Notes
1	7	Great Britain	Joshua Faulds, Emily Newnham, Sam Lunt, Nicole Yeargin	3:13.28	WQ, SB
2	5	South Africa	Tumisang Shezi, Shirley Nekhubui, Leendert Koekemoer, Zenéy van der Walt	3:13.79	WQ, SB
3	4	Spain	David García Zurita, Carmen Avilés, Samuel García, Berta Segura	3:14.16	SB
4	6	France	Gilles Biron, Estelle Raffai, Téo Andant, Alexe Déau	3:16.15	SB
5	9	India	Jay Kumar, Sneha Kollerik, Dharmveer Choudhary, Rupal Chaudhary	3:16.85	SB
6	8	Canada	Austin Cole, Alyssa Marsh, Nathan George, Dianna Proctor	3:22.37	SB
	3	Sri Lanka	Singhapurage Aruna Dharshana, Nadeesha Ramanayake, Kalinga Kumarage, Harshani Fernando	DNF	

=== Repechage Round (World Championships Qualifying Round 2) ===
The repechage round were held on 11 May 2025, starting at 19:13 (UTC+8) in the evening. The repechage round consisted of all countries which did not qualify for the final. Qualification: First 3 of each heat qualify to the 2025 World Athletics Championships (WQ).

==== Heat 1 ====
Rank	Lane	Nation	Competitors	Time	Notes
1	5	Spain	David García Zurita, Carmen Avilés, Samuel García, Blanca Hervas	3:12.55	WQ, NR
2	3	Germany	Manuel Sanders, Johanna Martin, Emil Agyekum, Jana Lakner	3:13.35	WQ, SB
3	9	China	Liang Boatang, Mo Jiadie, Zhang Qining, Liu Yinglan	3:13.39	WQ, NR
4	8	Jamaica	Javier Brown, Kelly-Ann Beckford, Delano Kennedy, Roneisha McGregor	3:14.42	SB
5	6	Switzerland	Ricky Petrucciani, Lena Wernli, Lionel Spitz, Annina Fahr	3:18.07	
6	4	Brazil	Jádson Lima, Erica Barbosa, Vinícius Moura, Rita de Cassia Ferreira	3:19.19	

==== Heat 2 ====
Rank	Lane	Nation	Competitors	Time	Notes
1	7	Italy	Edoardo Scotti, Virginia Troiani, Vladimir Aceti, Alice Mangione	3:12.53	WQ, SB
2	5	France	Muhammad Kounta, Fanny Peltier, Téo Andant, Louise Maraval	3:12.66	WQ, SB
3	8	Canada	Austin Cole, Lauren Gale, Nathan George, Zoe Sherar	3:12.95	WQ, NR
4	9	India	Santhosh Kumar Tamilarasan, Rupal Chaudhary, Vishal Thennarasu Kayalvizhi, Subha Venkatesan	3:14.81	SB
5	3	Uganda	Godfrey Chanwengo, Maureen Banura, Haron Adoli, Leni Shida	3:15.26	NR
6	6	Botswana	Thabang Charles Monngathipa, Tlhomphang Basele, Victor Ntweng, Naledi Monthe	3:19.11	SB
7	4	Sri Lanka	Kalinga Kumarage, Nadeesha Ramanayake, S.M.S.V Rajakaruna, Harshani Fernando	3:20.61	SB

=== Final ===
The final was held on 11 May 2025, starting at 21:03 (UTC+8) in the evening.

Rank	Lane	Nation	Competitors	Time	Notes
1st place, gold medalist(s)	6	United States	Chris Robinson, Courtney Okolo, Johnnie Blockburger, Lynna Irby-Jackson	3:09.54	CR WL
2nd place, silver medalist(s)	5	Australia	Luke van Ratingen, Ellie Beer, Terrell Thorne, Carla Bull	3:12.20	AR
3rd place, bronze medalist(s)	3	Kenya	David Kapirante, Mercy Chebet, Brian Onyari Tinega, Mercy Oketch	3:13.10	SB
4	7	Great Britain	Sam Lunt, Poppy Malik, Bailey Swift, Hannah Kelly	3:14.74	
5	4	South Africa	Mthi Mthimkulu, Jada van Staden, Tumisang Shezi, Hannah van Niekerk	3:16.29	
6	8	Belgium	Julien Watrin, Ilana Hanssens, Florent Mabille, Manon de Marez	3:16.45	
7	2	Poland	Michal Kijewski, Weronika Bartnowska, Daniel Sołtysiak, Karolina Łozowska	3:16.48	
8	9	Ireland	Jack Raftery, Phil Healy, Aaron Keane, Lauren Cadden	3:19.64	
