= 2024 World Athletics Continental Tour =

- Organisers: World Athletics
- Edition: 5th
- Dates: 20 January – 1 November

The 2024 World Athletics Continental Tour, also known as the 2024 Continental Tour, was the 5th season of the annual series of outdoor track and field meetings organised by World Athletics. The Tour forms the second tier of international one-day meetings after the 2024 Diamond League.

The Continental Tour was divided into four levels – Gold, Silver, Bronze and Challenger – each of which have different levels of competition and different prize offerings.

The 2024 Tour was used by some athletes as a chance to secure World Athletics Rankings points used to qualify for athletics at the 2024 Summer Olympics.

The Botswana Golden Grand Prix was originally scheduled to be a Gold-level meeting, but it was cancelled on 29 March due to administrative disagreements about whether meet founder Glody Dube or the Botswanan government would organize the event. Mmegi reported that a source told them, "World Athletics reportedly wants to rope in an American company in conjunction with the government to take over the organisation of the event, which is scheduled for April 14". Dube sued World Athletics, and by late March, the lawsuit was still ongoing and the Botswana Athletics Association had to cancel.

== Schedule ==
Date	Meeting	Venue	Country
Gold (11)
15 Feb	Maurie Plant Meet	Melbourne	Australia
20 Apr	Kip Keino Classic	Nairobi	Kenya
18 May	USATF Los Angeles Grand Prix	Los Angeles	United States
19 May	Seiko Golden Grand Prix	Tokyo	Japan
28 May	Ostrava Golden Spike	Ostrava	Czech Republic
9 Jun	USATF New York City Grand Prix	New York City	United States
18 Jun	Paavo Nurmi Games	Turku	Finland
21 Jun	Irena Szewinska Memorial	Bydgoszcz	Poland
7 Jul	FBK Games	Hengelo	Netherlands
9 Jul	Gyulai István Memorial - Hungarian Athletics Grand Prix	Székesfehérvár	Hungary
8 Sep	Memorial Borisa Hanžekovića	Zagreb	Croatia
Silver (39)
16 Mar	The TEN	San Juan Capistrano	United States
6 Apr	Grand Prix International CAA de Douala	Douala	Cameroon
6 Apr	Miramar Invitational	Miramar	United States
22 Apr	Drake Relays	Des Moines	United States
27 Apr	The Penn Relay Carnival	Philadelphia	United States
28 Apr	Bermuda Grand Prix	Devonshire	Bermuda
2 May	USATF Throws Festival - Tucson Elite Classic Elite Classic	Tucson	United States
9 May	What's Gravity Challenger	Doha	Qatar
11 May	Jamaica Athletics Invitational Meet	Kingston	Jamaica
15 May	Dromia International Sprint and Relays Meeting	Vari	Greece
18 May	ORLEN Janusz Kusocinski Memorial	Chorzów	Poland
18 May	Night of the 10,000m PBs	London	United Kingdom
19 May	Internationales Pfingstsportfest Rehlingen	Rehlingen	Germany
19 May	GRAND SLAM - Jerusalem	Jerusalem	Israel
22 May	International Marseille Meeting	Marseille	France
22 May	Raiffeisen AUSTRIAN OPEN Eisenstadt	Eisenstadt	Austria
22 May	Trond Mohn Games	Bergen	Norway
24 May	P-T-S meeting	Banská Bystrica	Slovakia
25 May	Meeting Stanislas Nancy	Tomblaine	France
31 May	The HBCU Classic at The Edwin Moses Track	Atlanta	United States
31 May	MoC Grand Prix	Lagos	Nigeria
1 Jun	Racers Grand Prix	Kingston	Jamaica
13 Jun	Edmonton Athletics Invitational	Edmonton	Canada
15 Jun	Harry Jerome Track Classic	Burnaby	Canada
16 Jun	Fly Athens	Athens	Greece
19 Jun	Filothei Women Gala	Athens	Greece
21 Jun	Meeting Madrid	Madrid	Spain
22 Jun	Brněnská Laťka Olympia	Brno	Czech Republic
23 Jun	Czesław Cybulski Memorial	Poznań	Poland
23 Jun	Piraeus Street Long Jump	Piraeus	Greece
25 Jun	WACT Silver Hammer Throw Competition	Szombathely	Hungary
4 Jul	Meeting International Sotteville	Sotteville-lès-Rouen	France
11 Jul	Ed Murphey Classic	Memphis	United States
16 Jul	Spitzen Leichtathletik Luzern	Luzern	Switzerland
19 Jul	Holloway Pro Classic	Gainesville	United States
1 Sep	ISTAF Berlin	Berlin	Germany
3 Sep	Palio Città della Quercia	Rovereto	Italy
9 Sep	Galà dei Castelli	Bellinzona	Switzerland
20 Sep	MoC Athletics Challenge Final	Uyo	Nigeria
Bronze (79)
10 Feb	Adelaide Invitational	Adelaide	Australia
15 Feb	Melbourne Invitational	Melbourne	Australia
24 Feb	International Track Meet	Christchurch	New Zealand
10 Mar	Sir Graeme Douglas Memorial Track Classic	Auckland	New Zealand
31 Mar	Continental Tour Ciudad de Santiago	Santiago	Chile
10 Apr	Continental Tour Semana del Mar	Mar del Plata	Argentina
13 Apr	Oklahoma Throws Series World Invitational	Ramona	United States
20 Apr	Felix Sanchez Classic	Bayaguana	Dominican Republic
24 Apr	The Hero!	Athens	Greece
29 Apr	Oda Mikio Memorial	Hiroshima	Japan
30 Apr	Meeting Iberoamericano Huelva	Huelva	Spain
2 May	Track Fest	Los Angeles	United States
3 May	Shizuoka International Athletics Meet	Fukuroi	Japan
3 May	UAE Athletics Grand Prix	Dubai	United Arab Emirates
8 May	Ročník Hvězdného Házení	Domažlice	Czech Republic
12 May	Kinami Michitaka Memorial Athletics Meet	Osaka	Japan
12 May	Hylo Javelin Meeting	Offenburg	Germany
15 May	'Filathlitikos Kallitheas ' International Jumping Meeting	Kallithea	Greece
15 May	Canarias Athletics Invitational	Santa Cruz de Tenerife	Spain
16 May	Meeting International de Montreuil	Montreuil	France
17 May	Cyprus International Athletics Meeting	Limassol	Cyprus
17 May	Liese Prokop Memorial	St. Pölten	Austria
17 May	Meeting Jaén Paraiso Interior	Andújar	Spain
18 May	Meeting de la Martinique	Fort-de-France	France
19 May	Meeting International Montgeron-Essonne	Montgeron	France
19 May	Míting Internacional Ciutat de Barcelona	Barcelona	Spain
19 May	Venizeleia-Chania International Meeting	Chania	Greece
22 May	G. Arzumanov Memorial	Tashkent	Uzbekistan
22 May	Kladno hází a Kladenské Memoriály	Kladno	Czech Republic
22 May	Memoriał płk. Wiesława Kiryka	Oleśnica	Poland
23 May	Heino Lipp Memorial	Jõhvi	Estonia
24 May	1500m Elite Jessheim	Jessheim	Norway
24 May	Anhalt - Internationales Leichtathletik Meeting	Dessau	Germany
24 May	Gorzów Meeting	Gorzów Wielkopolski	Poland
25 May	Meeting International de Dakar	Dakar	Senegal
25 May	True Athletes Classics	Leverkusen	Germany
25 May	Hallesche Werfertage	Halle (Saale)	Germany
25 May	IFAM Outdoor	Brussels	Belgium
26 May	Hungarian GP Series - Budapest	Budapest	Hungary
26 May	Meeting International de Forbach	Forbach	France
26 May	Opolski Festiwal Skoków	Opole	Poland
27 May	The Belt and Road Athletics Invitation Meeting	Chongqing	China
28 May	Pärnu beach stadium meeting	Pärnu	Estonia
31 May	Lisek w domu - International Pole Vault Meeting	Duszniki	Poland
31 May	MoC Invitational	Lagos	Nigeria
1 Jun	Oceania Invitational	Suva	Fiji
1 Jun	Taiwan Athletics Open	Taipei City	Chinese Taipei
3 Jun	Josef Odložil Memorial	Prague	Czech Republic
4 Jun	Royal City Inferno Track and Field Festival	Guelph	Canada
15 Jun	Meeting Nikaia	Nice	France
15 Jun	Night of Athletics	Heusden-Zolder	Belgium
16 Jun	Folksam GP Sollentuna	Sollentuna	Sweden
16 Jun	Meeting International d'Athlétisme de Troyes Aube	Troyes	France
18 Jun	Boysen Memorial	Oslo	Norway
18 Jun	Reunión Internacional Villa de Bilbao	Bilbao	Spain
19 Jun	Meeting International d'Athlétisme de la Province de Liège	Liège	Belgium
19 Jun	JBL Jump Fest	Košice	Slovakia
21 Jun	La Classique d'athlétisme de Montréal	Montreal	Canada
22 Jun	Atleticageneve - EAP	Geneva	Switzerland
22 Jun	Motonet GP Kuortane	Kuortane	Finland
22 Jun	Toulouse Capitole Perche	Toulouse	France
22 Jun	Qosanov Memorial	Almaty	Kazakhstan
23 Jun	Continental Tour Memorial Alex Quiñonez	Quito	Ecuador
4 Jul	Folksam Grand Prix Karlstad	Karlstad	Sweden
9 Jul	Cork City Sports International Athletics	Cork	Ireland
12 Jul	Morton Games	Dublin	Ireland
13 Jul	Grand Prix Nove Mesto nad Metuji	Nové Město nad Metují	Czech Republic
13 Jul	Moore-Guldensporenmeeting	Kortrijk	Belgium
13 Jul	Internationales Hochsprungmeeting Heilbronn	Heilbronn	Germany
14 Jul	Meeting Sport e Solidarietà Lignano	Lignano Sabbiadoro	Italy
20 Jul	Schönebecker Solecup	Schönebeck	Germany
16 Aug	Internationaler Thumer Werfertag	Thum	Germany
17 Aug	Golden Sand	Międzyzdroje	Poland
25 Aug	Tampere Motonet GP	Tampere	Finland
28 Aug	International Wiesław Maniak Memorial	Szczecin	Poland
1 Sep	Memorial Zbigniewa Ludwichowskiego	Olsztyn	Poland
1 Sep	International Meeting Città di Padova	Padua	Italy
3 Sep	Copenhagen Athletics Games	Copenhagen	Denmark
9 Sep	Gran Milan Athletic Gala	Milan	Italy
Challenger (117)
20 Jan	Potts Classic	Hastings	New Zealand
27 Jan	Cooks Classic	Whanganui	New Zealand
2 Feb	Team Ledger Harcourts Capital Classic	Wellington	New Zealand
15 Feb	10,000 m Challenge	Rishon LeZion	Israel
1 Mar	Canberra Track Classic	Canberra	Australia
14 Mar	ASA Athletics Grand Prix 1	Potchefstroom	South Africa
14 Mar	Spring Break Classic	Carolina	Puerto Rico
16 Mar	Velocity Fest 14	Kingston	Jamaica
18 Mar	ASA Athletics Grand Prix 2	Pretoria	South Africa
23 Mar	Grand Prix Estrella Puente	Paysandú	Uruguay
23 Mar	Sydney Track Classic	Sydney	Australia
24 Mar	Grand Prix Darwin Piñeyrúa	Paysandú	Uruguay
27 Mar	ASA Athletics Grand Prix 3 / Continental Tour Challenger	Johannesburg	South Africa
28 Mar	Albie Thomas Mile	Sydney	Australia
28 Mar	Grand Prix Atletica Chilena	Santiago	Chile
6 Apr	Challenger José de Zubiaur	Concepción del Uruguay	Argentina
6 Apr	MTN CHAMPS Continental Relays	Ibadan	Nigeria
7 Apr	Challenguer Hugo La Nasa	Concepción del Uruguay	Argentina
20 Apr	Velocity Fest 15	Kingston	Jamaica
20 Apr	Hyogo Relay Carnival	Kobe	Japan
26 Apr	Cape Milers Club/Endurocad WA Challenger Series	Cape Town	South Africa
29 Apr	Cape Milers Club/Endurocad WA Challenger Series	Cape Town	South Africa
1 May	MTN CHAMPS Grand Final	Port Harcourt	Nigeria
4 May	Meeting National Est Lyonnais	Décines-Charpieu	France
5 May	Internationales thallos Läufermeeting	Pliezhausen	Germany
8 May	Alexandrino Meeting - Georgios Pantos Memorial	Alexandreia	Greece
9 May	Jump&Fly	Hechingen	Germany
9 May	Tag der Überflieger	Essen	Germany
11 May	Memorial Matica Šuštaršiča in Patrika Cvetana	Kranj	Slovenia
11 May	Internationales Hochsprungmeeting	Berlin	Germany
11 May	Belfast Irish Milers Meet In Association with Tripadvisor	Belfast	United Kingdom
11 May	Meeting de Atletismo Toni Bonet	Ibiza	Spain
11 May	Puma Nitro Lange Laufnacht	Karlsruhe	Germany
12 May	Horst Mandl Memorial	Graz	Austria
12 May	Papaflessia	Kalamata	Greece
15 May	Savona International Meeting	Savona	Italy
15 May	Spåret5000m	Stockholm	Sweden
17 May	Meeting National de Carquefou	Carquefou	France
17 May	Meeting National de Seine et Mar	Fontainebleau	France
17 May	Memorial Jose Luis Hernandez	Pamplona	Spain
18 May	Int. Golden Roof Challenge	Innsbruck	Austria
18 May	International Athletics Meeting Slovenska Bistrica	Slovenska Bistrica	Slovenia
18 May	Pfingstmeeting	Zofingen	Switzerland
18 May	B&S Kurpfalz Gala Weinheim	Weinheim	Germany
18 May	Meeting Cidade de Lisboa	Lisbon	Portugal
18 May	Next Generation Athletics	Nijmegen	Netherlands
18 May	PUMA Fast Arms Fast Legs	Wetzlar	Germany
19 May	Lucca International Meeting	Lucca	Italy
20 May	Susanne Meier Memorial	Basel	Switzerland
21 May	Grand Prix Gliwice	Gliwice	Poland
21 May	Mednarodni Atletski Miting Ptuj in Memorial Roberta Preloga	Ptuj	Slovenia
22 May	Desafio Nerja	Nerja	Spain
22 May	GP Diputacion Csatellon - Memorial Jose Antonio Cansino	Castellón de la Plana	Spain
22 May	Motonet GP Jyväskylä	Jyväskylä	Finland
23 May	Grifone Meeting	Asti	Italy
24 May	Internationales Marktplatzspringen Recklinghausen	Recklinghausen	Germany
24 May	Meeting Toulon Provence Méditérranée	Toulon	France
24 May	Motonet GP Lahti	Lahti	Finland
25 May	British Milers Club Grand Prix	Manchester	United Kingdom
25 May	Brühler Mai-Meeting	St. Gallen	Switzerland
25 May	Gouden Spike Meeting	Leiden	Netherlands
25 May	Meeting EAP Annecy	Annecy	France
25 May	Sparkassen Gala	Regensburg	Germany
26 May	Bob Vigars Classic	London	Canada
31 May	Täby Stavhoppsgala	Täby	Sweden
31 May	Touch the Clouds Festival	Gräfelfing	Germany
1 Jun	EAP Malta International	Marsa	Malta
1 Jun	Meeting de Limoges	Limoges	France
2 Jun	Fuse Sprint	Tottori	Japan
2 Jun	Atletica 2000 Meeting	San Vito al Tagliamento	Italy
2 Jun	Johnny Loaring Classic	Windsor	Canada
2 Jun	Mityng na Rynku w Białymstoku	Białystok	Poland
7 Jun	Busan International Pole Vault Meeting	Busan	South Korea
8 Jun	British Milers Club Grand Prix	Watford	United Kingdom
15 Jun	Mednarodni miting Novo mesto	Novo Mesto	Slovenia
15 Jun	Heitjate seeriavõistluste Viimsi Gala	Tallinn	Estonia
15 Jun	Meeting Amiens Métrropole	Amiens	France
16 Jun	Janusz Sidlo Memorial	Sopot	Poland
16 Jun	Meeting International EAP de Nivelles	Nivelles	Belgium
19 Jun	International Athletics Meeting Maribor and Memorial of Iztok Ciglarič	Maribor	Slovenia
19 Jun	Meeting Internazionale Città di Nembro	Nembro	Italy
21 Jun	Athletics Meeting "Kostas Spanidis"	Thessaloniki	Greece
22 Jun	British Milers Club Grand Prix	Loughborough	United Kingdom
22 Jun	Meeting Internacional Terra de Volcans	Olot	Spain
22 Jun	Meeting of Braga	Braga	Portugal
22 Jun	Triveneto Meeting Internazionale	Trieste	Italy
22 Jun	Ordizia Meeting - International Meeting Jose Antonio Peña	Ordizia	Spain
29 Jun	MoC Relays	Benin City	Nigeria
6 Jul	British Milers Club Grand Prix	Birmingham	United Kingdom
6 Jul	FAST5000	Maisons-Laffitte	France
6 Jul	Meeting Maia Cidade do Desporto	Maia	Portugal
6 Jul	Ottawa Lions Presents The CTFL Final	Ottawa	Canada
10 Jul	WA Continental Tour Challenger - Loughborough EAP	Loughborough	United Kingdom
14 Jul	International Pole vault Meeting	Rottach-Egern	Germany
14 Jul	Internationales LAZ Meeting/Rhede	Rhede	Germany
14 Jul	Resisprint La Chaux-de-Fonds	La Chaux-de-Fonds	Switzerland
17 Jul	Meeting Arcobaleno EAP AtleticaEuropa	Celle Ligure	Italy
17 Jul	Motonet GP Lappeenranta	Lappeenranta	Finland
20 Jul	Internationales Hofer Sparkassen Stabhochsprung-Meeting	Hof	Germany
20 Jul	Motonet GP Joensuu	Joensuu	Finland
20 Jul	Tyczka na Molo	Sopot	Poland
27 Jul	Meeting voor Mon	Leuven	Belgium
10 Aug	British Milers Club Grand Prix	Bury	United Kingdom
14 Aug	St. Wendeler City Jump	St. Wendel	Germany
15 Aug	Sky's the Limit Meeting	Zweibrücken	Germany
17 Aug	BMW L. Louyet Meeting	Beersel	Belgium
17 Aug	Internationales Nordthüringer Leichtathletikmeeting	Sondershausen	Germany
17 Aug	Motonet GP - Oulu	Oulu	Finland
18 Aug	Internationales Stuttgarter Leichtathletik-Meeting	Stuttgart	Germany
21 Aug	Gothenburg Athletics Grand Prix	Gothenburg	Sweden
24 Aug	The Monument Mile Classic	Stirling	United Kingdom
27 Aug	Velka Cena Tabora	Tábor	Czech Republic
30 Aug	Mityng Ambasadorów Białostockiego Sportu	Białystok	Poland
30 Aug	Stadioneröffnung Dresden	Dresden	Germany
4 Sep	Bannister Invitational	Gothenburg	Sweden
8 Sep	International Pole Vault Meeting for Woman	Beckum	Germany
11 Sep	NetAachen Domspringen	Aachen	Germany
