= Terrell Thorne =

Australian sprinter (born 2007)

Personal information
- Born: 5 May 2007 (age 19)

Sport
- Sport: Athletics
- Event: Sprint

Achievements and titles
- Personal bests: 400 m 45.54 s (Perth, 2025)
Medal record
Men's athletics
Representing Australia
World Relays
| Silver medal – second place | 2025 Guangzhou | Mixed 4 × 400 m relay |

Terrell Thorne (born 5 May 2007) is an Australian sprinter. He set an Oceania record in the Mixed 4 × 400 metres relay at the 2025 World Athletics Relays, as part of an Australian silver medal winning team.

== Career ==
He finished in seventh place in the 400 metres at the 2024 World Athletics U20 Championships in Lima, Peru.

In December 2024, he ran an Australian under-18 record of 45.64 seconds for the 400 metres at the Australian All Schools Athletics Championships, eclipsing Paul Greene's 45.96 mark from 1989.

He was selected for the Australian relay pool for the 2025 World Athletics Relays in China in May 2025. On the first day he ran as part of the men's 4 × 400 metres relay. On the second day, he ran as part of the Australian Mixed 4x400 metres relay team which finished second overall behind the a United States in 3:12.20, setting a new Oceania record alongside Carla Bull, Ellie Beer and Luke van Ratingen. He was selected for the 2025 Summer World University Games in Germany.

He was selected for the Australian team for the 2025 World Athletics Championships in Tokyo, Japan.

== Personal life ==
From Queensland, he attended St Laurence's College in Brisbane. He is of Greek Australian descent.
