= Maurie Plant Meet =

Athletics tournament held in Melbourne, Australia

- Date: February
- Location: Lakeside Stadium, Melbourne, Australia
- Event type: Track and field
- World Athletics Cat.: World Continental Tour Gold
- 2026 Maurie Plant Meet

The Maurie Plant Meet – Melbourne is an annual outdoor track and field meeting which takes place in February at the Lakeside Stadium in Melbourne, Australia since 2023. Last held under the old name, Melbourne Track Classic, in early March 2016, prior to 2012 the meeting was held at the Olympic Park Stadium.

The competition was inaugurated in the late 1980s at the Olympic Stadium and gained a place on the IAAF Grand Prix circuit in its formative years. It remained on the major international outdoor track and field circuit, featuring as the opening race of the year on the IAAF World Athletics Tour from 2005 to 2009. It was the first race of the IAAF World Challenge series from 2010 through 2016. The event was also one of the foremost meets of the Australian Athletics Tour, along with the Sydney Track Classic. In 2023, the meet was upgraded and reimagined as the Maurie Plant Meet – Melbourne, held in memory of the athletics luminary as World Athletics Continental Tour Gold Level meet and part of the Chemist Warehouse Summer Series. Plant was known as one of the driving forces in the development and promotion of athletics in Australia. He was a meet promoter and athlete agent as well as strong supporter of the athletes. Plant was not without controversy, however, having asked heptathlete Jane Flemming to provide a substitute urine sample for the javelin thrower Sue Howland, fearing Howland would test positive to an anabolic steroid at the Ulster Games in Belfast on 30 June 1986.

The Melbourne Track Classic featured many high level performances including continental Oceanian records by Tim Forsyth in the men's high jump, Nathan Deakes in the men's 5000 metre walk, Scott Martin in the shot put, Lisa Corrigan in the mile run and Bronwyn Thompson in the women's long jump. National records have also been set at the meeting by New Zealand and Australia's athletes.

== Editions ==
Maurie Plant Meet editions
Ed.	Title	Venue	Date	Status
	Alcoa Challenge Series - Melbourne	Melbourne Olympic Park	17 January 1980	
	Alcoa Challenge Series - Melbourne	Melbourne Olympic Park	15 January 1981	
	Alcoa Challenge Series - Melbourne	Melbourne Olympic Park	14 January 1982	
	International Meet	Melbourne Olympic Park	27 January 1983	
	International Meet	Melbourne Olympic Park	18 January 1984 6 March 1984	
	International Meet	Melbourne Olympic Park	21 March 1985	
	International Meet	Melbourne Olympic Park	20 March 1986	
			1987	
1st	NEC Classic	Melbourne Olympic Park	17 March 1988	
2nd	NEC Classic	Melbourne Olympic Park	9 March 1989	
3rd	NEC Classic	Melbourne Olympic Park	8 February 1990	
4th	NEC Classic	Melbourne Olympic Park	7 February 1991	
5th	NEC Classic	Melbourne Olympic Park	25 February 1992	
6th	NEC Classic	Melbourne Olympic Park	25 February 1993	
7th	NEC Classic	Melbourne Olympic Park	24 February 1994	
8th	NEC Classic	Melbourne Olympic Park	23 February 1995	
9th	NEC Classic	Melbourne Olympic Park	29 February 1996	IAAF Grand Prix II
10th	Nike Track Classic	Melbourne Olympic Park	20 February 1997	IAAF Grand Prix II
11th	Melbourne Track Tour	Melbourne Olympic Park	25 February 1998	IAAF Grand Prix II
12th	Melbourne Track Classic	Melbourne Olympic Park	25 February 1999	IAAF Grand Prix II
13th	Melbourne Track Classic	Melbourne Olympic Park	2 March 2000	IAAF Grand Prix II
14th	Telstra Melbourne Track Classic	Melbourne Olympic Park	1 March 2001	IAAF Grand Prix Final
15th	Telstra A-series - Melbourne	Melbourne Olympic Park	7 March 2002	IAAF Grand Prix II
16th	Telstra A-series - Melbourne	Melbourne Olympic Park	1 March 2003	IAAF Grand Prix II
17th	Telstra A-series - Melbourne	Melbourne Olympic Park	12 February 2004	IAAF Grand Prix II
18th	Telstra A-series - Melbourne	Melbourne Olympic Park	17 February 2005	IAAF Grand Prix II
19th	Telstra A-series - Melbourne	Melbourne Olympic Park	9 March 2006	IAAF Grand Prix
20th	Telstra A-series - Melbourne	Melbourne Olympic Park	2 March 2007	IAAF Grand Prix
21st	Melbourne Athletic Grand Prix	Melbourne Olympic Park	21 February 2008	IAAF Grand Prix
22nd	Melbourne GP Series Meet	Melbourne Olympic Park	5 March 2009	IAAF Grand Prix
23rd	IAAF Melbourne Track Classic	Melbourne Olympic Park	4 March 2010	IAAF World Challenge
24th	IAAF Melbourne Track Classic	Melbourne Olympic Park	3 March 2011	IAAF World Challenge
25th	Qantas Melbourne Track Classic	Lakeside Stadium	2-3 March 2012	IAAF World Challenge
26th	Qantas Melbourne Track Classic	Lakeside Stadium	6 April 2013	IAAF World Challenge
27th	IAAF Melbourne Track Classic	Lakeside Stadium	22 March 2014	IAAF World Challenge
28th	IAAF Melbourne Track Classic	Lakeside Stadium	21 March 2015	IAAF World Challenge
29th	Melbourne Track Classic	Lakeside Stadium	5 March 2016	IAAF World Challenge
	not held		2017	
	not held		2018	
	not held		2019	
30th	Melbourne Track Classic	Lakeside Stadium	6 February 2020	
31st	Melbourne Track Classic	Lakeside Stadium	25 February 2021	
32nd	Melbourne Track Classic	Lakeside Stadium	19 March 2022	Area Permit
33rd	Maurie Plant Meet	Lakeside Stadium	23 February 2023	Continental Tour Gold
34th	2024 Maurie Plant Meet	Lakeside Stadium	15 February 2024	Continental Tour Gold
35th	2025 Maurie Plant Meet	Lakeside Stadium	29 March 2025	Continental Tour Gold
36th	2026 Maurie Plant Meet	Lakeside Stadium	27–28 March 2026	Continental Tour Gold

== Meeting records ==
=== Men ===
Men's meeting records of the Maurie Plant Meet
Event	Record	Athlete	Nationality	Date	Meet	Ref.
100 m	10.03 (+0.3 m/s)	Lachlan Kennedy	Australia	28 March 2026	2026	
200 m	19.92	Frankie Fredericks	Namibia	1999		
400 m	44.41	Jacory Patterson	United States	28 March 2026	2026	
800 m	1:43.15	David Rudisha	Kenya	2010		
1500 m	3:30.42	Cameron Myers	Australia	28 March 2026	2026	
Mile	3:51.54	Simon Doyle	Australia	1991		
3000 m	7:41.02	Jackson Sharp	Australia	28 March 2026	2026	
5000 m	13:08.43	Bernard Lagat	United States	3 March 2011		
10,000 m	28:30.32	Joseph Kimani	Kenya	2000		
110 m hurdles	13.24	Colin Jackson	Great Britain	1996		
110 m hurdles	13.24	Colin Jackson	Great Britain	1999		
400 m hurdles	48.40	Bryan Bronson	United States	1998		
3000 m steeplechase	8:19.47	John Kosgei	Kenya	2000		
High jump	2.31 m	Tim Forsyth	Australia	1996		
Pole vault	5.81 m	Steven Hooker	Australia	2007		
Long jump	8.30 m	Peter Burge	Australia	2000		
Triple jump	16.91 m (±0.0 m/s)	Henry Frayne	Australia	3 March 2011		
Shot put	21.37 m	Tomas Walsh	New Zealand	21 March 2015		
Discus throw	68.17 m	Matthew Denny	Australia	29 March 2025	2025	
Hammer throw	78.91 m	Stuart Rendell	Australia	2003		
Javelin throw	87.13 m	Sergey Makarov	Russia	1999		
5000 m walk (track)	18:38.97	Dane Bird-Smith	Australia	5 March 2016		
4 × 100 m relay	39.30	Will Roberts; Jake Doran; Jacob Despard; Jack Hale	Australia	19 March 2022		

=== Women ===
Women's meeting records of the Maurie Plant Meet
Event	Record	Athlete	Nationality	Date	Meet	Ref.
100 m	11.01	Marion Jones	United States	1998		
200 m	22.54	Cathy Freeman	Australia	1993		
400 m	49.85	Cathy Freeman	Australia	1996		
800 m	1:59.42	Toni Hodgkinson	New Zealand	1997		
800 m	1:59.42	Tamsyn Lewis	Australia	2000		
1500 m	4:01.30	Claudia Hollingsworth	Australia	28 March 2026	2026	
Mile	4:22.66	Lisa Corrigan	Australia	2007		
3000 m	8:34.30	Fentaye Belayneh	Ethiopia	29 March 2025	2025	
5000 m	14:57.54	Rose Davies	Australia	15 February 2024	2024	
100 m hurdles	12.49 (+0.8 m/s)	Sally Pearson	Australia	3 March 2012		
400 m hurdles	54.64	Jana Pittman	Australia	2003		
3000 m steeplechase	9:29.93	Donna MacFarlane	Australia	2008		
High jump	1.99 m	Nicola Olyslagers	Australia	15 February 2024	2024	
Pole vault	4.72 m	Nina Kennedy	Australia	28 March 2026	2026	
Long jump	7.00 m	Bronwyn Thompson	Australia	2002		
Triple jump	13.89 m (±0.0 m/s)	Nneka Okpala	New Zealand	5 March 2016		
Shot put	20.13 m	Valerie Adams	New Zealand	3 March 2011		
Discus throw	66.10 m	Daniela Costian	Australia	1994		
Hammer throw	71.26 m	Jillian Shippee	United States	29 March 2025	2025	
Javelin throw	66.83 m	Kimberley Mickle	Australia	22 March 2014		
3000 m walk (track)	11:51.26	Kerry Junna	Australia	1991		
5000 m walk (track)	21:19.46	Beki Smith	Australia	5 March 2016		
4 × 100 m relay	43.15	Torrie Lewis; Ella Connolly; Bree Masters; Mia Gross	Australia	19 March 2022		
4 × 400 m relay	3:32.41	Susan Andrews; Kylie Hanigan; Maree Holland; Cathy Freeman	Australia	1993		

=== Mixed ===
Mixed meeting records of the Maurie Plant Meet
Event	Record	Athlete	Nationality	Date	Meet	Ref.
4 × 100 m relay	41.26	Jacob Despard; Chloe Mannix-Power; Christopher Ius; Kristie Edwards	Australia	28 March 2026	2026	
