= 2026 World Athletics Relays – Men's 4 × 400 metres relay =

Men's 4 × 400 metres relay at the 2026 World Athletics Relays
- Venue: Botswana National Stadium, Gaborone
- Dates: 2 May (heats); 3 May (repechage round & final)
- Winning time: 2:54.47 CR

Medalists
| gold medal | Lee Eppie; Letsile Tebogo; Bayapo Ndori; Collen Kebinatshipi; Justice Oratile* | Botswana |
| silver medal | Mthi Mthimkulu; Lythe Pillay; Leendert Koekemoer; Zakithi Nene; Udeme Okon* | South Africa |
| bronze medal | Luke van Ratingen; Reece Holder; Tom Reynolds; Aidan Murphy; Matthew Hunt* | Australia |

The men's 4 × 400 metres relay at the 2026 World Athletics Relays was held at the Botswana National Stadium in Gaborone, Botswana on 2 and 3 May 2026.

The event will serve as a qualifying event for the 2027 World Athletics Championships in Beijing. In this context, the top 12 teams will qualify for the World Championships.

== Records ==
Prior to the competition, the records were as follows:

| Record | Team | Time | Location | Date |
|---|---|---|---|---|
| World record | United States (Andrew Valmon, Quincy Watts, Butch Reynolds, Michael Johnson) | 2:54.29 | Stuttgart, Germany | 22 August 1993 |
| Championships record | United States (David Verburg, Tony McQuay, Christian Taylor, LaShawn Merritt) | 2:57.25 | (The Bahamas) Nassau, Bahamas | 25 May 2014 |
| 2026 World Leading | Pure Athletics (Chris Robinson, Jereem Richards, Caleb Dean, Khaleb McCrae) | 2:57.33 | Gainesville, United States | 18 April 2026 |

== Qualification ==
The top 8 teams in each event at the 2025 World Athletics Championships automatically qualify for entry to the championships. The remaining teams (up to 24 in total per event ) will be determined through the top lists in the qualification period from 1 January 2025 to 5 April 2026. Host country Botswana can enter with one team in each event, regardless of any entry conditions.

== Program ==
All times are local (UTC+2).

| Date | Time | Round |
|---|---|---|
| 2 May 2026 | 16:30 | Heats |
| 3 May 2026 | 15:08 | Repechage round |
| 3 May 2026 | 16:51 | Final |

== Results ==
=== Heats (World Championships Qualifying Round 1) ===
The heats were held on 2 May 2026, starting at 16:30 in the afternoon. Qualification: the first 2 of each heat (WQ) plus 2 fastest times (Wq) qualify to World Athletics Championships and World Athletics Relays Final.

==== Heat 1 ====
| Rank | Lane | Nation | Competitors | Time | Notes |
|---|---|---|---|---|---|
| 1 | 3 | Australia | Luke van Ratingen, Reece Holder, Matthew Hunt, Aidan Murphy | 2:57.30 | WQ, WL |
| 2 | 7 | Botswana | Lee Eppie, Justice Oratile, Collen Kebinatshipi, Bayapo Ndori | 2:57.52 | WQ, SB |
| 3 | 6 | Netherlands | Keenan Blake, Eugene Omalla, Tony van Diepen, Jonas Phijffers | 2:58.22 | Wq, SB |
| 4 | 5 | Brazil | Vinícius Moura, Lucas Vilar, Tiago Lemes Da Silva, Matheus Lima | 2:59.59 | SB |
| 5 | 8 | Jamaica | Assinie Wilson, Jevaughn Powell, Jeremy Bembridge, Raheem Hayles | 3:00.48 | SB |
| 6 | 2 | Nigeria | Gafari Badmus, Ifeanyi Emmanuel Ojeli, Victor Ime, Ezekiel Eno Asuquo | 3:01.04 | SB |
| 7 | 1 | Denmark | Gustav Lundholm Nielsen, Joel Von De Ahé, Christoffer Banke Jørgensen, Sebastian Monneret | 3:05.33 | SB |
| 8 | 4 | Poland | Mìkolai Pyszka, Wiktor Wróbel, Remiqiusz Zazula, Mateusz Rzeźniczak | 3:05.47 | SB |

==== Heat 2 ====
| Rank | Lane | Nation | Competitors | Time | Notes |
|---|---|---|---|---|---|
| 1 | 4 | South Africa | Udeme Okon, Mthi Mthimkulu, Leendert Koekemoer, Zakithi Nene | 2:58.04 | WQ, SB |
| 2 | 5 | Portugal | Pedro Afonso, Ericsson Tavares, João Coelho, Omar Elkhatib | 2:59.01 [.002] | WQ, NR |
| 3 | 8 | Zimbabwe | Dennis Bradley Hove, Zuze Leeford, Gerren Muwishi, Thandazani Ndhlovu | 2:59.01 [.009] | Wq, NR |
| 4 | 3 | Germany | Jean Paul Bredau, Thorben Finke, Manuel Sanders, Owe Fischer-Breiholz | 3:00.04 | SB |
| 5 | 2 | Senegal | Abdou Aziz Ndiaye, Frederic Mendy, Abou Adama Sane, Cheikh Tidiane Diouf | 3:01.13 | SB |
| 6 | 7 | Kenya | Dennis Mulongo, Kipkorir Rotich, Erastus Mbaluka, Danson Kibet | 3:02.70 | |
| | 6 | China | Liang Baotang, Ju Tiangi, Liu Kai, Xu Xinlong | DNF | |

==== Heat 3 ====
| Rank | Lane | Nation | Competitors | Time | Notes |
|---|---|---|---|---|---|
| 1 | 6 | Belgium | Jonathan Sacoor, Robin Vanderbemden, Alexander Doom, Daniel Segers | 2:59.83 | WQ, SB |
| 1 | 3 | Qatar | Ammar Ibrahim, Bassem Hemeida, Youssouf Djibrine, Ashraf Osman | 2:59.83 | WQ, NR |
| 3 | 4 | Spain | Markel Fernández, Samuel García, Manuel Guijarro, Óscar Husillos | 3:00.26 | NR |
| 4 | 5 | India | Dharmveer Choudhary, Rajesh Ramesh, Vishal Thennarasu Kayalvizhi, Manu Tekkinalil Sali | 3:00.32 | SB |
| 5 | 8 | Japan | Shinya Hayashi, Yuki Joseph Nakajima, Takuho Yoshizu, Kenki Imaizumi | 3:00.79 | SB |
| 6 | 2 | Switzerland | Vincent Gendre, Lionel Spitz, Julien Bonvin, Dany Brand | 3:01.18 | NR |
| 7 | 7 | Great Britain | Lewis Davey, Lee Thompson, Seamus Derbyshire, Toby Harries | 3:01.22 | SB |
| 8 | 1 | Mexico | Valente Mendoza, Gerardo Hernández Aguirre, Edgar Ramírez, Luis Avilés | 3:13.60 | |

=== Repechage Round (World Championships Qualifying Round 2) ===
The heats were held on 3 May 2026, starting at 15:08 in the afternoon. Qualification: the first 2 of each heat (WQ) qualify to World Athletics Championships.

==== Heat 1 ====
| Rank | Lane | Nation | Competitors | Time | Notes |
|---|---|---|---|---|---|
| 1 | 1 | Senegal | Abdou Aziz Ndiaye, Frederic Mendy, Abou Adama Sane, Cheikh Tidiane Diouf | 3:01.28 | WQ |
| 2 | 8 | Spain | David García, Samuel García, Manuel Guijarro, Óscar Husillos | 3:01.37 | WQ |
| 3 | 5 | Nigeria | Gafari Badmus, Ifeanyi Emmanuel Ojeli, Victor Ime, Ezekiel Eno Asuquo | 3:01.43 | |
| 4 | 6 | Jamaica | Assinie Wilson, Jeremy Bembridge, Jevaughn Powell, Raheem Hayles | 3:01.63 | |
| 5 | 7 | Germany | Jean Paul Bredau, Thorben Finke, Manuel Sanders, Owe Fischer-Breiholz | 3:02.21 | |
| 6 | 4 | Kenya | Dennis Mulongo, Danson Kibet, Erastus Mbaluka, Kevin Kipkorir | 3:07.71 | |
| 7 | 2 | Denmark | Gustav Lundholm Nielsen, Neloo Falck Christoffer Banke Jørgensen, Sebastian Monneret | 3:21.32 | |
| | 3 | Mexico | | DNS | |

==== Heat 2 ====
| Rank | Lane | Nation | Competitors | Time | Notes |
|---|---|---|---|---|---|
| 1 | 7 | Japan | Shinya Hayashi, Takuho Yoshizu, Kenki Imaizumi, Yuki Joseph Nakajima | 3:00.19 | WQ, SB |
| 2 | 4 | Brazil | Vinícius Moura, Lucas Vilar, Tiago Lemes Da Silva, Matheus Lima | 3:00.45 | WQ |
| 3 | 3 | Great Britain | Lewis Davey, Toby Harries, Lee Thompson, Seamus Derbyshire | 3:01.13 | SB |
| 4 | 5 | China | Liang Baotang, Xiao Heng, Liu Kai, Xu Xinlong | 3:01.59 | SB |
| 5 | 2 | Switzerland | Julien Bonvin, Ricky Petrucciani, Dany Brand, Lionel Spitz | 3:01.59 | |
| 6 | 6 | Poland | Marcin Karolewski, Wiktor Wróbel, Kajetan Duszyński, Mateusz Rzeźniczak | 3:04.81 | SB |
| | 8 | India | Dharmveer Choudhary, Amoj Jacob, Rajesh Ramesh, Vishal Thennarasu Kayalvizhi | DNF | |

=== Final ===
The final was held on 3 May 2026, starting at 16:51 in the afternoon.

| Rank | Lane | Nation | Competitors | Time | Notes |
|---|---|---|---|---|---|
| 1st place, gold medalist(s) | 8 | Botswana | Lee Eppie, Letsile Tebogo, Bayapo Ndori, Collen Kebinatshipi | 2:54.47 | CR, NR |
| 2nd place, silver medalist(s) | 7 | South Africa | Mthi Mthimkulu, Lythe Pillay, Leendert Koekemoer, Zakithi Nene | 2:55.07 | NR |
| 3rd place, bronze medalist(s) | 4 | Australia | Luke van Ratingen, Reece Holder, Tom Reynolds, Aidan Murphy | 2:55.20 | AR |
| 4 | 3 | Portugal | Pedro Afonso, Ericsson Tavares, João Coelho, Omar Elkhatib | 2:59.75 | |
| 5 | 2 | Zimbabwe | Dennis Bradley Hove, Zuze Leeford, Gerren Muwishi, Thandazani Ndhlovu | 2:59.79 | |
| 6 | 1 | Netherlands | Keenan Blake, Eugene Omalla, Tony van Diepen, Jonas Phijffers | 3:00.13 | |
| 7 | 6 | Belgium | Julien Watrin, Robin Vanderbemden, Dylan Borlée, Alexander Doom | 3:00.69 | |
| | 5 | Qatar | Ammar Ibrahim, Bassem Hemeida, Samir Moussa Hassan, Ashraf Osman | DQ | TR.17.2.3 |
