= Fraser Coast Anglican College =

Coordinates: 25.3147°S 152.8518°E

Fraser Coast Anglican College is a private school in Hervey Bay, Queensland.

The college was founded in 1995.

== Summary ==
Fraser Coast Anglican College is an Anglican co-ed school and college accommodating 800 plus students starting from Kindergarten to Year Twelve. Apart from the academic program, students have the opportunity to participate in extracurricular activities such as: sports; fine arts and music; educational tours and excursions; outdoor camping, and leadership orientation programs.

The Foundation Principal was Grahame Ginn OAM. The College was founded in 1995.

Its current principal is Joe Wright.
