= Cooper Sherman =

Australian athlete (born 2004)

Personal information
- Nationality: Australian
- Born: 25 February 2004 (age 22)

Sport
- Sport: Track and Field
- Event: 400 metres

Achievements and titles
- Personal bests: 400m: 45.26s (Perth, 2025)
Medal record
Men's athletics
Representing AUS
World Relays
Silver medal – second place	2025 Guangzhou	Mixed 4×400 m relay
Oceania Championships
Silver medal – second place	2024 Suva	400 m

Cooper Sherman (born 25 February 2004) is an Australian sprinter. He won the Australian Athletics Championships over 400 metres in 2024 and 2025.

== Biography ==
He is from Ballarat in Victoria, Australia and is a member of Ballarat Harriers Athletics Club.

He won the Australian Athletics Championships over 400 metres in April 2024. He ran as part of the Australian 4 × 400 m relay team at the 2024 World Relays Championships in Nassau, Bahamas in May 2024. He was a silver medalist over 400 metres at the 2024 Oceania Athletics Championships in Suva, Fiji in June 2024.

He ran a new 400 metres personal best of 45.41 seconds at the ACT Championships in Canberra in January 2025. He lowered it again, to 45.31 seconds at the Perth Classic in March 2025. He was selected for the 400 metres at the 2025 World Athletics Indoor Championships in Nanjing in March 2025, where he reached the semi-finals. He retained his title at the Australian Athletics Championships over 400 metres in a personal best time of 45.26 seconds on 12 April 2025.

He was a member of the Australian team in the Mixed 4 × 400 m relay at the 2025 World Athletics Relays which set a new Oceania record of 3:12.34, taking nearly five seconds off the previous best mark set in 2021, and became the first Mixed team in Australian history to qualify for a major championships, qualifying on the first day of the competition for the 2025 World Championships. Australia went on to win the silver medal in the final of the event on the second day of the competition as Sherman transferred across to help qualify the men's 4x400m relay for the 2025 World Championships in the second round of qualifying.

He was selected for the Australian team for the 2025 World Athletics Championships in Tokyo, Japan. He ran in the heats of the men's 400 metres without advancing to the semi-finals. He also ran in the men's 4 x 400 metres relay in which the Australian team ran a national record before being disqualified for an illegal handover.

In Canberra in January 2026, he ran a personal best 45.08 seconds for the 400 metres to win the Capital Athletics Open and Under 20 Championships ahead of Tom Reynolds. Sherman ran a personal best to win the 400 metres at the Perth Track Classic on 14 February 2026, with a time of 44.85 seconds. On 11 April 2026, he was a finalist over 400 metres at the 2026 Australian Athletics Championships, placing fourth overall. He was selected for the Australian team to compete at the 2026 World Athletics Relays in Gaborone, Botswana. Alongside Ellie Beer, Mia Gross and Reynolds he was part of the Australian mixed 4 x 400 metres relay team which set an Oceanian record of 3:10.57 on the opening day. He represented Australia in the mixed 4 × 400 m relay at the 2026 Commonwealth Games.
