= Lianna Davidson =

Australian thrower

Personal information
- Nationality: Australian
- Born: 8 November 2002 (age 23)

Sport
- Sport: Athletics
- Event: Javelin throw

Achievements and titles
- Personal bests: Javelin: 63.79 (Atlanta, 2025)
Medal record
Women's athletics
Representing Australia
Oceania Championships
Bronze medal – third place	2026 Darwin	Javelin

Lianna Davidson (born 8 November 2002) is an Australian javelin thrower. She finished second at the 2024 NCAA Outdoor Track And Field Championships and represented Australia at the 2025 World Athletics Championships.

== Early life ==
She is from Bowen Mountain in the City of Hawkesbury in New South Wales. She was educated at Hills Sports High School in Sydney, and as well as competing in athletics, played baseball, and played at the Little League World Series in Michigan for The Quakers Hill Pirates, as a pitcher, in 2017. She later attended Texas A&M University in the United States before transferring to the University of Georgia.

== Career ==
She threw 52.89 metres to win the javelin throw at the New South Wales Championships in 2020. in April 2021, she threw a personal best of 54.64m.

At the 2024 NCAA Championships in Eugene, Oregon, she finished second overall with a throw of 60.70 metres.

In March 2025, she threw 63.79m to go to seventh on the Australian all-time list, whilst competing in Atlanta, Georgia. She beat Australian champion Mackenzie Little to win the javelin at the Maurie Plant Meet in Melbourne on 29 March 2025. She finishes fourth at the 2025 NCAA Outdoor Championships final in Eugene, Oregon in June 2025. She was selected for the 2025 Summer World University Games in Germany, placing seventh in the final. She competed at the 2025 World Athletics Championships in Tokyo, Japan, in September 2025, without advancing to the final.

On 11 April 2026, she was runner-up to McKenzie Little with a throw of 58.28m at the 2026 Australian Championships. On 18 May, she won the bronze medal at the 2026 Oceania Athletics Championships in Darwin with a throw of 59.66 metres. She placed fourth in the javelin throw at the 2026 Commonwealth Games in Glasgow, Scotland.
