= Reece Holder =

Australian athlete (born 2002)

Personal information
- Nationality: Australian/English
- Born: 20 August 2002 (age 24) Denmark Hill, Greater London, England
- Home town: Queensland, Australia
- Height: 1.85 m (6 ft 1 in)

Sport
- Sport: Athletics
- Event: Sprint

Achievements and titles
- Personal bests: 400m: 44.53 (Paris, 2024)
Medal record
Men's athletics
Representing Australia
World Relays
Silver medal – second place	2025 Guangzhou	Mixed 4×400 m relay
Bronze medal – third place	2026 Gaborone	4×400 m relay
Summer World University Games
Silver medal – second place	2021 Chengdu	400 m

Reece Holder (born 20 August 2002) is an Australian sprinter. In 2026, he won the Australian Athletics Championships in the 400 metres.

== Biography ==
From Wellington Point, Queensland, he is a member of Thompson Estate Athletics Club. At the age of 15 years-old, Holder won the national under-17 400 metres title.

He ran a 400 metres personal best of 44.79 in Chengdu in August 2023, to win a silver medal at the delayed 2021 Summer World University Games. This time placed him into the top-5 all time Australian 400m runners.

He was selected for the Australian team to run the individual 400 metres at the 2024 Paris Olympics. There, in the qualification heat of the 400 metres event he ran a personal best time of 44.53 and in his semifinal finished in fifth place.

He was a member of the Australian team in the Mixed 4x400m relay at the 2025 World Athletics Relays which set a new Oceania record of 3:12.34, taking nearly five seconds off the previous best mark set in 2021, and became the first Mixed team in Australian history to qualify for a major championships, qualifying on the first day of the competition for the 2025 World Championships. Australia went on to win the silver medal in the final of the event on the second day of the competition as Holder transferred across to help qualify the men's 4x400m relay for the 2025 World Championships in the second round of qualifying. He won at the Golden Grand Prix in Tokyo, Japan, running the 400m in 44.76 seconds on 18 May 2025.

He was selected for the Australian team for the 2025 World Athletics Championships in Tokyo, Japan, running a season's best 44.54 seconds to qualify for the 400m semi-finals, before placing third in his semi-final in 44.63 seconds. He also ran in the men's 4 x 400 metres relay in which the Australian team ran a national record before being disqualified for an illegal handover.

On 11 April 2026, Holder ran 45.11 seconds to win the 400 m at the 2026 Australian Championships. Competing at the 2026 World Athletics Relays in Botswana, he was part of the Australian men's 4 x 400 metres relay team alongside Luke van Ratingen, Matthew Hunt, and Aidan Murphy who set a new Oceania record of 2:57.30 breaking the previous best that had stood since 1984. The following day he ran in the final of the men's 4 x 400 m relay as the Australian team ran a national record 2:55.20 to win the bronze medal and move to sixth on the world all-time list. In July 2026, he was a semi-finalist in the 400 metres at the 2026 Commonwealth Games in Glasgow, Scotland.

== Personal life ==
Holder was born in England before moving to Queensland, Australia during primary school. He graduated from Wellington Point State High School in 2020 during the COVID-19 lockdown. He attended Queensland University of Technology. His father is from Trinidad and Tobago.
