= Jacob Despard =

Australian athlete (born 1996)

Personal information
- Nationality: Australian
- Born: 20 November 1996 (age 29) Hobart, Tasmania
- Height: 1.83 m (6 ft 0 in)

Sport
- Sport: Track and Field
- Event: Sprinting

Jacob Despard (born 20 November 1996) is an Australian sprinter. He competed at the 2024 Olympic Games.

== Early life ==
From Tasmania, he was a keen cricketer in his youth and specialised as a fast bowler, before focusing on athletics.

== Career ==
He made his junior international debut at the 2014 World Junior Championships in Athletics in Eugene, Oregon. He relocated from Tasmania to Melbourne and shortly afterwards won the Stawell Gift race in 2018. He made his senior Australian debut at the 2022 Commonwealth Games in Birmingham, England.

He ran as part of the Australian 4x100m relay team which qualified for the 2024 Paris Olympics at the 2024 World Relays Championships in Nassau, Bahamas. He was a member of Australia's 4x100-metre men's relay team at the 2024 Olympic Games that ran a time of 38.12 seconds to set a new national record.

He finished third behind Lachlan Kennedy and Josh Azzopardi over 60 metres at the Australian short track national championships in Sydney on 1 February 2025. In September 2025, he competed in the men's 4 x 100 metres at the 2025 World Championships in Tokyo, Japan.

On 11 April 2026, he was a finalist over 100 metres at the 2026 Australian Athletics Championships. He was selected for the Australian team to compete at the 2026 World Athletics Relays in Gaborone, Botswana.
