= Luke van Ratingen =

Australian sprinter

Personal information
- Born: 12 October 2001 (age 25)

Sport
- Sport: Athletics
- Event: Sprint

Achievements and titles
- Personal bests: 400 m: 45.03 s (Melbourne, 2026)
Medal record
Men's athletics
Representing AUS
World Relays
Silver medal – second place	2025 Guangzhou	Mixed 4 × 400 m relay
Bronze medal – third place	2026 Gaborone	4×400 m relay
Oceania Championships
Gold medal – first place	2024 Suva	400 m
Bronze medal – third place	2026 Darwin	400 m

Luke van Ratingen (born 12 October 2001) is an Australian sprinter. He was a gold medalist over 400 metres at the 2024 Oceania Athletics Championships.

== Biography ==
Van Ratingen was second to Fred Kerley over 400 metres at the Sydney Classic in March 2023. He ran 45.88 seconds to win the 2023 Australian Athletics Championships in Brisbane.

Van Ratingen ran as part of the Australian 4 × 400 m relay team at the 2024 World Relays Championships in Nassau, Bahamas in May 2024. He was a gold medalist over 400 metres at the 2024 Oceania Athletics Championships in Suva, Fiji in June 2024. He equalled his personal best in June 2024 but missed the 2024 Olympic Games through an injury which took eight months of rehabilitation to recover from.

Van Ratingen was selected for the Australian relay pool for the 2025 World Athletics Relays in China in May 2025. On the first day he ran as part of the men's 4 × 400 metres relay. On the second day, he ran as part of the Australian Mixed 4 × 400 metres relay team which finished second overall in 3:12.20. Van Ratingen was selected for the Australian team for the 2025 World Athletics Championships in Tokyo, Japan, running in the mixed 4 × 400 metres relay.

In March 2026, he won the 400 m in a personal best 45.21 seconds at the Adelaide Invitational. That month, he lowered his best to 45.03 seconds at the Maurie Plant Meet. On 11 April, he ran 45.25 seconds to finish runner-up to Reece Holder in the 400 m at the 2026 Australian Championships. He was selected for the Australian team to compete at the 2026 World Athletics Relays in Gaborone, Botswana. On the opening day he was part of the Australian men's 4 x 400 metres relay team alongside Matthew Hunt, Reece Holder, and Aidan Murphy who set a new Oceania record of 2:57.30 breaking the previous best that had stood since 1984. In the final, he ran time as the team ran 2:55.20 to break the Australian record they set in the preliminary round the previous day and move within a second of the world record. Later that month, he won the bronze medal over 400 m at the 2026 Oceania Athletics Championships behind Murphy and Tom Reynolds in an Australian sweep of the medals.
