= Ellie Beer =

Australian sprinter (born 2003)

Personal information
- Born: 3 January 2003 (age 23) Gold Coast, Queensland, Australia
- Height: 1.83 m (6 ft 0 in)

Sport
- Country: Australia
- Sport: Athletics
- Event: Sprinting
Medal record
Women's athletics
Representing Australia
World Indoor Championships
Bronze medal – third place	2025 Nanjing	4 × 400 m relay
World Relays
Silver medal – second place	2025 Guangzhou	Mixed 4 × 400 m relay
Oceania Championships
Gold medal – first place	2024 Suva	400 m

Ellie Beer (born 3 January 2003) is an Australian athlete. She competed in the women's 4 × 400 metres relay event at the 2019 World Athletics Championships. At the 2020 Tokyo Olympics, Beer was a member of the Australian team that competed in the women's 4 × 400 metre relay. The team of Kendra Hubbard and Annaliese Rubie-Renshaw and Bendere Oboya finished 7th in their heat and did not contest the final.

== Early life ==
Beer was born on the Gold Coast and attended Marymount College throughout her upbringing. At six years old, she joined Gold Coast Little Athletics and Nippers at Currumbin Surf Club. She went undefeated in state and national beach sprints in her age group. By the age of 14, in 2017, Beer had already clocked 54.83 in the 400 m and on the beach won the Australian under-14 flags and beach sprint titles.

== Achievements ==
As a 15 year old, Beer won the national U16 200/400 m double and in December 2018 the national U16 200/400 m double, closing the year with Personal Best (PB) times of 23.94/53.55. In the 2019 summer she won the Australian U17 200/400 m double, but her major achievement was winning the Brisbane Track Classic 400 m in a 0.9 seconds PB time of 52.53 to become the fourth fastest U18 in Australian history.

Beer was selected in the Australian team for the 2019 World Relays. She was part of the team that came fifth in the final. She was selected in the Australian team for the 2019 World Championships. At the age of 16 years and 268 days, Beer was the youngest ever Australian selected for the championships. Running her leg in a time of 52.0 seconds, Beer helped the Australian team to 3:28.64 and qualification for the Tokyo 2020 Olympics.

Domestically in 2021, at 18, she is the second best in Australia behind world championships semi-finalist Bendere Oboya. By mid way through 2024 Ellie had a new PB and Australian 400 m lead, running 51.59 in Adelaide in April.
