= Aidan Murphy =

Australian sprinter (born 2003)

- Murphy in 2024

Personal information
- Born: 14 October 2003 (age 23) Adelaide, Australia
- Height: 1.94 m (6 ft 4 in)

Sport
- Sport: Athletics
- Events: 200 metres, 400 metres
- Coached by: Nik Hagicostas (2024–); Dylan Hicks (2023–24); Peter Fitzgerald (2021–23)

Achievements and titles
- Highest world ranking: 18th (200 m, 2026); 40th (400 m, 2026)
- Personal bests: 100 m: 10.23 (2026); 200 m: 19.88 (2026); 400 m: 44.44 (2026)
Medal record
Men's athletics
Representing Australia
World Relays
Bronze medal – third place	2026 Gaborone	4 × 400 m relay
Oceania Championships
Gold medal – first place	2022 Mackay	200 m
Gold medal – first place	2022 Mackay	4 × 400 m relay
Gold medal – first place	2026 Darwin	200 m
Gold medal – first place	2026 Darwin	400 m
Silver medal – second place	2024 Suva	200 m

Aidan Murphy (born 14 October 2003) is an Australian sprinter who competes in the 200 metres and 400 metres. A four-time Oceania champion and World Relays bronze medallist, he holds the Australian and Oceanian records in the men's 4 × 400 metres relay.

== Early life and background ==
Murphy was born on 14 October 2003 in Adelaide, South Australia, Australia. During his childhood, he participated in several sports, including surf lifesaving, BMX, tennis and water polo, before deciding to focus on athletics in 2016. At age 12, he joined Saints Athletics Club, which was founded at St Peter's College. Murphy later attended the college, where he received an inaugural General Excellence Scholarship in 2018. He served as vice-captain of the school's athletics team before graduating in 2020. As of 2026, he is studying for a Bachelor of Economics at Adelaide University.

== Career ==
=== 2022–2024: National title and international debut ===
In February 2022, Murphy broke the 37-year-old Australian under-20 200 metres record at the South Australian Championships, running 20.41 seconds (−1.3 m/s). In April, he won the 200 m at the Australian Athletics Championships in Sydney. Two months later, he took gold in both the 200 m and 4 × 400 m relay at the Oceania Athletics Championships in Mackay. In July, Murphy made his senior World Championships debut in Eugene, finishing sixth in his 200 m heat. Two weeks later, he reached the 200 m semi-finals at the World Athletics U20 Championships in Cali, missing the final by 0.01 seconds.

In 2023, Murphy began training with Dylan Hicks, who succeeded Peter Fitzgerald as his coach. He returned to the World Athletics Championships in Budapest that August, finishing sixth in his 200 m heat. The following year, he placed third overall and second among Australian competitors in the 200 m at the Australian Athletics Championships in Adelaide, before taking silver at the Oceania Athletics Championships in Suva. Despite those podium finishes, Murphy did not qualify for the 2024 Paris Olympics and later said he had considered leaving athletics around this time. Instead, he began training under Nik Hagicostas that August.

=== 2025: Relay development and Tokyo disqualification ===
In his first full season under Hagicostas, Murphy finished second behind Gout Gout in the 200 m at the Australian Athletics Championships, running a wind-assisted 20.40 seconds (+2.2 m/s). In May, he ran a 44.65-second third leg at the World Athletics Relays in Guangzhou, helping Australia's men's 4 × 400 m relay team finish second in its repechage heat with a time of 2:59.73. Two months later, Murphy placed fifth in the 200 m and anchored Australia's men's 4 × 100 m relay team to fourth place at the World University Games in Bochum, missing bronze by 0.005 seconds.

In September, Murphy finished sixth in his 200 m heat at the World Athletics Championships in Tokyo, running 20.54 seconds (−0.5 m/s). Later that week, Murphy again ran the third leg for Australia's men's 4 × 400 m relay team, which crossed the line in 2:58.00, faster than the existing national record. However, a takeover-zone infringement resulted in the team's disqualification, preventing the time from counting as a national record. Despite the setback, Australia's pursuit of the record continued into the following season as Murphy made further progress over 400 m.

=== 2026: World Relays bronze and Oceania double ===
In January, Murphy broke Bruce Frayne's 41-year-old South Australian 400 m record with a 45.12-second run. Five weeks later, he lowered the record again to 44.81 seconds. In March, he won the 200 m at the Adelaide Invitational with a meet-record time of 20.43 seconds (−1.3 m/s), defeating Diamond League champion Jacory Patterson. The following month, he finished second behind Gout at the Australian Athletics Championships in Sydney, lowering his four-year-old 200 m personal best to 19.88 seconds (+1.7 m/s) and becoming only the second Australian in history to break the 20-second barrier.

In May, Murphy anchored Australia to bronze in the men's 4 × 400 m relay at the World Athletics Relays in Gaborone, running a 43.79-second split. The team's time of 2:55.20 set Australian and Oceanian records and made Australia the fourth-fastest nation in the event's history. Later that month, he completed a sprint double at the Oceania Athletics Championships in Darwin, winning the 400 m in a personal best and championship record of 44.44 seconds before taking the 200 m in another championship record of 20.05 seconds (+0.6 m/s). Only Michael Johnson and LaShawn Merritt have run faster legal times in both the 200 m and 400 m while contesting rounds of both events at the same meet. In July, after recovering from a small hamstring tear, Murphy made his Commonwealth Games debut in Glasgow, competing in the semi-finals of the men's 200 metres but not advancing to the final.

== Personal bests ==
Information taken from World Athletics profile unless otherwise noted.

Event	Time	Wind (m/s)	Location	Date	Notes
100 metres	10.23	+1.1	Adelaide, Australia	7 March 2026	
200 metres	19.88	+1.7	Sydney, Australia	12 April 2026	
400 metres	44.44	—N/a	Darwin, Australia	19 May 2026	
4 × 100 m	38.89	—N/a	Bochum, Germany	27 July 2025	
4 × 400 m	2:55.20	—N/a	Gaborone, Botswana	3 May 2026	AR

== Competition results ==
=== International competitions ===
Representing Australia
Year	Competition	Venue	Position	Event	Time	Notes
2022	Oceania Championships	Mackay, Australia	1st	200 m	20.76	
2022	Oceania Championships	Mackay, Australia	1st	4 × 400 m relay	3:11.14	
2022	World Championships	Eugene, United States	36th (h)	200 m	20.75	
2022	World U20 Championships	Cali, Colombia	11th (sf)	200 m	20.84	
2023	World Championships	Budapest, Hungary	42nd (h)	200 m	20.90	
2024	Oceania Championships	Suva, Fiji	2nd	200 m	21.11	
2025	World Relays	Guangzhou, China	2nd (Note: Repechage round (World Championships qualifying round 2).)	4 × 400 m relay	2:59.73	
2025	World University Games	Bochum, Germany	5th	200 m	20.92	
2025	World University Games	Bochum, Germany	4th	4 × 100 m relay	38.89	
2025	World Championships	Tokyo, Japan	32nd (h)	200 m	20.54	
2025	World Championships	Tokyo, Japan	DQ	4 × 400 m relay	—N/a	TR24.21
2026	World Relays	Gaborone, Botswana	3rd	4 × 400 m relay	2:55.20	AR
2026	Oceania Championships	Darwin, Australia	1st	400 m	44.44	CR
2026	Oceania Championships	Darwin, Australia	1st	200 m	20.05	CR
2026	Commonwealth Games	Glasgow, Scotland	21st (sf)	200 m	20.70	

=== National championships ===
Year	Competition	Venue	Position	Event	Time	Wind (m/s)	Notes
2021	Australian Athletics Championships U20	Sydney	2nd	200 m	21.30	+1.4	
2022	Australian Athletics Championships	Sydney	1st	200 m	20.53	−0.9	
2023	Australian Athletics Championships	Brisbane	4th (Note: Fifth overall; Japan's Yoshihide Kiryu was classified as out of competition.)	200 m	20.93	−0.4	
2024	Australian Athletics Championships	Adelaide	2nd (Note: Third overall; South Africa's Theodor Young was classified as out of competition.)	200 m	20.94	−1.0	
2025	Australian Athletics Championships	Perth	2nd	200 m	20.40	+2.2	
2026	Australian Athletics Championships	Sydney	2nd	200 m	19.88	+1.7	
