= List of Oceanian under-23 bests in athletics =

Oceanian U23 bests in the sport of athletics are the all-time best marks set in competition by aged 22 or younger throughout the entire calendar year of the performance and competing for a member nation of the Oceania Athletics Association (OAA). Technically, in all under-23 age divisions, the age is calculated "on December 31 of the year of competition" to avoid age group switching during a competitive season. OAA does not maintain an official list for such performances. All bests shown on this list are tracked by statisticians not officially sanctioned by the governing body.

== Outdoor ==
=== Men ===
Event	Record	Athlete	Nationality	Date	Meet	Place	Age	Ref.
60 m	6.43 (+1.6 m/s)	Lachlan Kennedy	Australia	25 January 2025	ACT Open Championships	Canberra, Australia	21 years, 82 days	
100 m	10.00 (+0.9 m/s)	Gout Gout	Australia	21 February 2026	Dane Bird-Smith Shield Meet	Brisbane, Australia	18 years, 54 days	
150 m	14.96 (±0.0 m/s)	Gout Gout	Australia	16 June 2026	Golden Spike Ostrava	Ostrava, Czech Republic	18 years, 169 days	
200 m	19.67 (+1.7 m/s)	Gout Gout	Australia	12 April 2026	Australian Championships	Sydney, Australia	18 years, 104 days	
400 m								
800 m	1:44.07	Peyton Craig	Australia	13 April 2025	Australian Championships	Perth, Australia	20 years, 16 days	
1000 m	2:16.41	Daniel Williams	Australia	10 July 2026	Herculis	Fontvieille, Monaco	18 years, 341 days	
1500 m	3:28.00	Cameron Myers	Australia	28 June 2026	Meeting de Paris	Paris, France	20 years, 19 days	
Mile	3:46.06	Cameron Myers	Australia	4 July 2026	Prefontaine Classic	Eugene, United States	20 years, 25 days	
3000 m	7:41.11	Cameron Myers	Australia	14 December 2024	On Track Nights: Zatopek: 10	Melbourne, Australia	18 years, 188 days	
5000 m								
10,000 m								
Marathon								
110 m hurdles								
400 m hurdles								
3000 m steeplechase								
High jump								
Pole vault								
Long jump								
Triple jump	17.01 m A (±0.0 m/s)	Ethan Olivier	New Zealand	25 May 2024	ACNW League 10	Potchefstroom, South Africa	18 years, 292 days	
Triple jump	17.01 m (+1.4 m/s)	Ethan Olivier	New Zealand	29 August 2024	World U20 Championships	Lima, Peru	19 years, 12 days	
Shot put	21.24 m	Tom Walsh	New Zealand	27 July 2014	Commonwealth Games	Glasgow, Scotland	22 years, 148 days	
Discus throw	66.23 m	Connor Bell	New Zealand	22 February 2023	Maurie Plant Meet	Melbourne, Australia	21 years, 246 days	
Hammer throw								
Javelin throw								
Decathlon	8649 pts	Ashley Moloney	Australia	4–5 August 2021	Olympic Games	Tokyo, Japan	21 years, 145 days	
Decathlon	100m (wind) / Long jump (wind) / Shot put / High jump / 400m / 110m H (wind) / Discus / Pole vault / Javelin / 1500m; 10.34 (+0.2 m/s) / 7.64 m (+0.4 m/s) / 14.49 m / 2.11 m / 46.29 / 14.08 (−1.0 m/s) / 44.38 m / 5.00 m / 57.12 m / 4:39.19							
Mile walk	5:59.65	Corey Dickson	Australia	14 December 2023	Collingwood Classic	Melbourne, Australia	21 years, 148 days	
5000 m walk (track)	18:40.37	Isaac Beacroft	Australia	8 August 2026	World U20 Championships	Eugene, United States	19 years, 21 days	
10000m walk (track)	38:02.68	Isaac Beacroft	Australia	11 December 2025	New South Wales 10000m Walk Championships	Sydney, Australia	18 years, 146 days	
10 km walk (road)	39:56	Isaac Beacroft	Australia	21 April 2024	World Athletics Race Walking Team Championships	Antalya, Turkey	16 years, 278 days	
20 km walk (road)								
50 km walk (road)								
4 × 100 m relay								
4 × 400 m relay								

=== Women ===
Event	Record	Athlete	Nationality	Date	Meet	Place	Age	Ref.
100 m	11.10 (+1.6 m/s)	Torrie Lewis	Australia	27 January 2024	ACT Championships	Canberra, Australia	19 years, 19 days	
200 m								
400 m								
800 m	1:57.67	Claudia Hollingsworth	Australia	16 August 2025	Kamila Skolimowska Memorial	Chorzów, Poland	20 years, 126 days	
1000 m	2:34.63	Abbey Caldwell	Australia	4 August 2023	Citius Meeting	Bern, Switzerland	22 years, 32 days	
1500 m	3:58.09	Claudia Hollingsworth	Australia	5 March 2026	Box Hill Classic	Box Hill, Australia	20 years, 327 days	
Mile	4:20.51	Abbey Caldwell	Australia	21 July 2023	Herculis	Fontvieille, Monaco	22 years, 18 days	
3000 m								
5000 m								
10,000 m								
Marathon								
100 m hurdles								
300 m hurdles	39.00	Jana Pittman	Australia	11 July 2004		Meilen, Switzerland	21 years, 245 days	
400 m hurdles								
3000 m steeplechase								
High jump								
Pole vault	4.94 m	Eliza McCartney	New Zealand	17 July 2018		Jockgrim, Germany	21 years, 218 days	
Long jump								
Triple jump								
Shot put								
Discus throw								
Hammer throw								
Javelin throw								
Heptathlon								
Heptathlon	100m H (wind) / High jump / Shot put / 200m (wind) / Long jump (wind) / Javelin / 800m							
20 km walk (road)								
35 km walk (road)	2:42:40	Olivia Sandery	Australia	16 March 2025	World Athletics Race Walking Tour	Nomi, Japan	22 years, 53 days	
4 × 100 m relay	44.34	Chelsea Scolyer; Olivia Dodds; Zara Hagan; Jessica Milat	Australia	23 March 2024	Sydney Track Classic	Sydney, Australia	19 years, 82 days	
4 × 400 m relay								

== Indoor ==
=== Men ===
Event	Record	Athlete	Nationality	Date	Meet	Place	Age	Ref.
60 m								
200 m								
400 m	47.20	Paul Greene	Australia	9 March 1991	World Championships	Seville, Spain	18 years, 90 days	
800 m	1:47.27	Joseph Deng	Australia	16 February 2019	Birmingham Indoor Grand Prix	Birmingham, United Kingdom	20 years, 224 days	
1500 m	3:32.67+	Cameron Myers	Australia	8 February 2025	Millrose Games	New York City, United States	18 years, 244 days	
Mile	3:47.48	Cameron Myers	Australia	8 February 2025	Millrose Games	New York City, United States	18 years, 244 days	
3000 m	7:27.57	Cameron Myers	Australia	24 January 2026	New Balance Indoor Grand Prix	Boston, United States	19 years, 229 days	
60 m hurdles								
High jump	2.28 m	Tim Forsyth	Australia	10 March 1991	World Championships	Seville, Spain	17 years, 205 days	
Pole vault	5.32 m	Sasha Zhoya	Australia	23 February 2019	French U18 Championships	Liévin, France	16 years, 243 days	
Long jump								
Triple jump								
Shot put	21.26 m	Tom Walsh	New Zealand	7 March 2014	World Championships	Sopot, Poland	22 years, 6 days	
Heptathlon	6344 pts	Ashley Moloney	Australia	18–19 March 2022	World Championships	Belgrade, Serbia	22 years, 6 days	
Heptathlon	60m / Long jump / Shot put / High jump / 60m H / Pole vault / 1000m; 6.70 / 7.82 m / 13.89 m / 2.02 m / 7.88 / 5.10 m / 2:43.01							
5000 m walk								
4 × 400 m relay								

=== Women ===
Event	Record	Athlete	Nationality	Date	Meet	Place	Age	Ref.
60 m	7.39	Celeste Mucci	Australia	18 February 2017	Simplot Games	Pocatello, United States	17 years, 191 days	
200 m	23.74	Lauren Hewitt	Australia	7 March 1997	World Championships	Paris, France	18 years, 102 days	
400 m								
800 m								
1000 m	2:38.45	Hayley Kitching	Australia	17 January 2026	Nittany Lion Challenge	State College, United States	21 years, 113 days	
1500 m	4:13.21	Georgie Clarke	Australia	10 March 2001	World Championships	Lisbon, Portugal	16 years, 266 days	
Mile	4:38.80	Lilli Burdon	New Zealand	28 January 2017	Columbia East-West Challenge	New York City, United States	19 years, 2 days	
Mile	4:36.98 OT	Lilli Burdon	New Zealand	11 February 2017	Husky Classic	Seattle, United States	19 years, 16 days	
3000 m	9:08.57	Melany Smart	Australia	28 February 2020	BU Last Chance Invitational	Boston, United States	18 years, 279 days	
3000 m	9:06.52 OT	Melany Smart	Australia	14 February 2020	Husky Classic	Seattle, United States	18 years, 265 days	
5000 m	15:00.75	Amy Bunnage	Australia	7 December 2024	BU Sharon Colyear-Danville Season Opener	Boston, United States	19 years, 260 days	
60 m hurdles	8.26	Celeste Mucci	Australia	17 February 2017	Simplot Games	Pocatello, United States	17 years, 190 days	
High jump	1.91 m	Gai Kapernick	Australia	5 March 1989	World Championships	Budapest, Hungary	18 years, 166 days	
Pole vault	4.75 m	Eliza McCartney	New Zealand	3 March 2018	World Championships	Birmingham, United Kingdom	21 years, 82 days	
Long jump								
Triple jump								
Shot put								
Pentathlon								
Pentathlon	60m H / High jump / Shot put / Long jump / 800m							
3000 m walk								
4 × 400 m relay								
