= List of Oceanian under-20 records in athletics =

Oceanian junior records in the sport of athletics are ratified by the Oceania Athletics Association (OAA). Athletics records comprise the best performance of an athlete before the year of their 20th birthday. Technically, in all under 20 age divisions, the age is calculated "on December 31 of the year of competition" to avoid age group switching during a competitive season. The OAA maintains these records only in a specific list of outdoor events. All other records, including all indoor records, shown on this list are tracked by statisticians not officially sanctioned by the world governing body.

== Outdoor ==
Key: Awaiting ratification Record not kept by the OAA Not ratified or later rescinded by the OAA

=== Men ===
Event	Record	Athlete	Nationality	Date	Meet	Place	Age	Ref.
60 m	6.73 (+0.7 m/s)	Josiah John	Australia	1 February 2025	Australian Short Track Championships	Sydney, Australia	17 years, 89 days	
100 m	10.15 (+1.5 m/s)	Jake Doran (Note: Nicholas Doran by Oceania Athletics source)	Australia	1 July 2018		Jämsä, Finland	17 years, 225 days	
100 m	10.00 (+0.9 m/s)	Gout Gout	Australia	21 February 2026	Dane Bird-Smith Shield Meet	Brisbane, Australia	18 years, 54 days	
100 m	9.9 h (+0.9 m/s)	Edward Osei-Nketia	New Zealand	24 November 2018	AACT Summer Series	Canberra, Australia	17 years, 200 days	
100 m	10.0 h (+1.3 m/s)	Paul Narracott	Australia	19 March 1978		Brisbane, Australia	18 years, 162 days	
150 m	14.96 (±0.0 m/s)	Gout Gout	Australia	16 June 2026	Golden Spike Ostrava	Ostrava, Czech Republic	18 years, 169 days	
200 m	20.04 (+1.5 m/s)	Gout Gout	Australia	7 December 2024	Australian All-Schools Championships	Brisbane, Australia	16 years, 344 days	
200 m	19.67 (+1.7 m/s)	Gout Gout	Australia	12 April 2026	Australian Championships	Sydney, Australia	18 years, 104 days	
300 m	32.42	Darren Clark	Australia	6 July 1984		Gateshead, United Kingdom	18 years, 304 days	
400 m	44.75	Darren Clark	Australia	8 August 1984		Los Angeles, United States	18 years, 337 days	
800 m	1:44.11	Peyton Craig	Australia	9 August 2024	Olympic Games	Saint-Denis, France	19 years, 134 days	
1000 m	2:17.44	Cameron Myers	Australia	7 July 2024	FBK Games	Hengelo, Netherlands	18 years, 28 days	
1000 m	2:16.41	Daniel Williams	Australia	10 July 2026	Herculis	Fontvieille, Monaco	18 years, 341 days	
1500 m	3:33.26 (Note: outdoor best; indoor mark ratified as absolute record)	Cameron Myers	Australia	16 July 2023	Kamila Skolimowska Memorial	Chorzów, Poland	17 years, 37 days	
Mile	3:50.15 (Note: outdoor best; indoor mark ratified as absolute record)	Cameron Myers	Australia	25 May 2024	Prefontaine Classic	Eugene, United States	17 years, 351 days	
2000 m	5:09.40	Matthew Ramsden	Australia	15 June 2016		Perth, Australia	18 years, 328 days	
3000 m	7:41.11 (Note: outdoor best; indoor mark ratified as absolute record)	Cameron Myers	Australia	14 December 2024	On Track Nights: Zatopek: 10	Melbourne, Australia	18 years, 188 days	
5000 m	13:25.63	Mizan Mehari	Australia	7 August 1999		Hechtel, Belgium	19 years, 191 days	
10,000 m	28:50.4 h	Robert de Castella	Australia	16 December 1976		Melbourne, Australia	19 years, 293 days	
10 km (road)	29:09	Ryan Gregson	Australia	19 October 2008	Burnie Ten	Burnie, Australia	18 years, 176 days	
One hour	18678 m	Tony Bart	Australia	29 August 1973		Adelaide, Australia		
20,000 m	1:10:03.8	Max Little	Australia	5 October 1968		Melbourne, Australia		
25,000 m	1:24:12.0+	Eero Keranen	Australia	3 November 1974		Melbourne, Australia		
25,000 m	1:19:56.4+ (Note: listed by OAA as Oceanian U20 best, unclear why)	Joshua Harris	Australia	31 July 2016		Hobart, Australia	26 years, 28 days	
30,000 m	1:46:53	Eero Keranen	Australia	3 November 1974		Melbourne, Australia		
30,000 m	1:36:39.7 (Note: listed by OAA as Oceanian U20 best, unclear why)	Joshua Harris	Australia	31 July 2016		Hobart, Australia	26 years, 28 days	
110 m hurdles (99.0 cm)	13.27 (−1.0 m/s)	Nicholas Hough	Australia	12 July 2012	World Junior Championships	Barcelona, Spain	18 years, 266 days	
110 m hurdles (107.0 cm)	13.76 A NWI	Don Wright	Australia	19 May 1978		Pocatello, United States	19 years, 23 days	
200 m hurdles	24.00	Peter Bate	Australia	14 December 1995		Melbourne, Australia		
200 m hurdles	23.2 h	Peter Balthes	Australia	9 February 1963		Brisbane, Australia		
400 m hurdles	49.73	Rohan Robinson	Australia	10 August 1990		Plovdiv, Bulgaria	18 years, 268 days	
2000 m steeplechase	5:31.80	Michael Inwood	Australia	11 December 1983		Adelaide, Australia	17 years, 358 days	
3000 m steeplechase	8:32.01	Ky Robinson	Australia	11 June 2021	NCAA Division I Championships	Eugene, United States	19 years, 104 days	
High jump	2.34 m	Tim Forsyth	Australia	4 July 1992	Bislett Games	Oslo, Norway	18 years, 322 days	
High jump	2.34 m	Tim Forsyth	Australia	10 July 1992	TSB Games	London, United Kingdom	18 years, 328 days	
High jump	2.34 m	Tim Forsyth	Australia	2 August 1992	Olympic Games	Barcelona, Spain	18 years, 351 days	
Pole vault	5.70 m	Kurtis Marschall	Australia	26 June 2016	Bauhaus Junior Gala	Mannheim, Germany	19 years, 62 days	
Long jump	8.12 m (+1.1 m/s)	Christopher Noffke	Australia	11 July 2007		Nuoro, Italy	19 years, 186 days	
Triple jump	17.01 m A (±0.0 m/s)	Ethan Olivier	New Zealand	25 May 2024	ACNW League 10	Potchefstroom, South Africa	18 years, 292 days	
Triple jump	17.01 m (+1.4 m/s)	Ethan Olivier	New Zealand	29 August 2024	World U20 Championships	Lima, Peru	19 years, 12 days	
Shot put (6 kg)	23.00 m	Jacko Gill	New Zealand	18 August 2013		Auckland, New Zealand	18 years, 241 days	
Shot put	20.38 m	Jacko Gill	New Zealand	3 December 2011		North Shore, New Zealand	16 years, 348 days	
Discus throw (1.75 kg)	66.81 m	Matthew Denny	Australia	23 November 2014		Brisbane, Australia	18 years, 174 days	
Discus throw (1.75 kg)	67.40 m	Connor Bell	New Zealand	7 March 2020	New Zealand Championships	Christchurch, New Zealand	18 years, 260 days	
Discus throw (2 kg)	62.58 m	Matthew Denny	Australia	11 July 2015		Gwangju, South Korea	19 years, 39 days	
Discus throw (2 kg)	63.25 m	Connor Bell	New Zealand	25 January 2020	Potts Classic	Hastings, New Zealand	18 years, 218 days	
Discus throw (2 kg)	65.62 m	Werner Reiterer	Australia	15 December 1987		Melbourne, Australia	19 years, 322 days	
Hammer throw (6 kg)	80.48 m	Matthew Denny	Australia	25 September 2015		Townsville, Australia	19 years, 115 days	
Hammer throw	70.52 m	Matthew Denny	Australia	17 May 2015		Germany	18 years, 349 days	
Javelin throw	79.60 m	Gavin Lovegrove	New Zealand	8 March 1987		Wellington, New Zealand	19 years, 138 days	
Decathlon (junior)	8190 pts	Ashley Moloney	Australia	10–11 July 2018	World U20 Championships	Tampere, Finland	18 years, 120 days	
Decathlon (junior)	100m (wind) / Long jump (wind) / Shot put / High jump / 400m / 110m H (wind) / Discus / Pole vault / Javelin / 1500m; 10.51 (−0.3 m/s) / 7.06 m (+1.1 m/s) / 12.83 m (6 kg) / 2.10 m / 46.86 / 14.13 (−0.3 m/s) (0.99 m) / 47.39 m (1.750 kg) / 4.60 m / 53.67 m / 4:42.65							
Decathlon (senior)	8103 pts	Ashley Moloney	Australia	25–26 June 2019		Townsville, Australia	19 years, 105 days	
Decathlon (senior)	100m (wind) / Long jump (wind) / Shot put / High jump / 400m / 110m H (wind) / Discus / Pole vault / Javelin / 1500m; 10.59 (+1.0 m/s) / 7.52 m (+1.0 m/s) / 13.48 m / 1.92 m / 46.75 / 14.29 (+1.2 m/s) / 42.36 m / 5.00 m / 54.38 m / 4:53.73							
5000 m walk (track)	19:23.96	Isaac Beacroft	Australia	14 March 2024	NSW Championships	Sydney, Australia	16 years, 240 days	
5000 m walk (track)	18:40.37	Isaac Beacroft	Australia	8 August 2026	World U20 Championships	Eugene, United States	19 years, 21 days	
10,000 m walk (track)	39:36.39	Isaac Beacroft	Australia	30 August 2024	World U20 Championships	Lima, Peru	17 years, 43 days	
10,000 m walk (track)	38:02.68	Isaac Beacroft	Australia	11 December 2025	New South Wales 10000m Walk Championships	Sydney, Australia	18 years, 146 days	
10 km walk (road)	39:56	Isaac Beacroft	Australia	21 April 2024	World Athletics Race Walking Team Championships	Antalya, Turkey	16 years, 278 days	
20,000 m walk (track)	1:36:39.7	Michael Harvey	Australia	27 June 1981		Melbourne, Australia	18 years, 204 days	
20 km walk (road)	1:24:46	Adam Rutter	Australia	6 March 2005		Sydney, Australia	18 years, 72 days	
4 × 100 m relay	39.12	F. Newah-Jarfoi; S. Sultana; C. Hasler; Gout Gout	Australia	24 February 2024		Brisbane, Australia	16 years, 57 days	
4 × 200 m relay	1:25.48	Champion; Kearney; Mace; Theodore	Australia	4 December 1983		Sydney, Australia		
4 × 400 m relay	3:04.74	Daniel McFarlane; Daniel Batman; Scott Thom; Casey Vincent	Australia	2 August 1998	World Junior Championships	Annecy, France	17 years, 135 days 19 years, 138 days	
4 × 800 m relay	7:39.5	Earl; Ozolins; Trinca; Wheeler	Australia	29 November 1981		Sydney, Australia		
4 × 800 m relay	7:39.31	Jesse Beadman; Robert Dredge; Angus Baldwin; Craig Cameron	Australia	20 November 2011	NSW Open Championship	Sydney, Australia		
4 × 1500 m relay	15:45.09	Bowden; Gibly; Sly; Unthank	Australia	28 March 1992		Melbourne, Australia		

=== Women ===
Event	Record	Athlete	Nationality	Date	Meet	Place	Age	Ref.
60 m	7.30 (+1.3 m/s)	Thewbelle Philp	Australia	1 February 2025	Australian Short Track Championships	Sydney, Australia	16 years, 302 days	
100 m	11.10 (+1.6 m/s)	Torrie Lewis	Australia	27 January 2024	ACT Championships	Canberra, Australia	19 years, 19 days	
200 m	22.74 (+2.0 m/s)	Raelene Boyle	Australia	18 October 1968	Olympic Games	Mexico City, Mexico	17 years, 116 days	
300 m	36.87	Cathy Freeman	Australia	17 July 1992		Gateshead, United Kingdom	19 years, 152 days	
400 m	51.14	Cathy Freeman	Australia	28 June 1992		Birmingham, United Kingdom	19 years, 133 days	
800 m	1:58.40	Claudia Hollingsworth	Australia	14 April 2024	Australian Championships	Adelaide, Australia	19 years, 2 days	
1000 m	2:36.72	Claudia Hollingsworth	Australia	8 March 2021		Box Hill, Australia	15 years, 330 days	
1500 m	4:02.96	Claudia Hollingsworth	Australia	4 April 2024	Box Hill Classic	Box Hill, Australia	18 years, 358 days	
Mile	4:32.73	Susie Power	Australia	17 December 1992		Melbourne, Australia	17 years, 266 days	
2000 m	5:50.47	Susie Power	Australia	4 September 1994		Sheffield, United Kingdom	19 years, 162 days	
3000 m	8:51.90	Amy Bunnage	Australia	11 March 2023	Sydney Track Classic	Sydney, Australia	17 years, 354 days	
3000 m	8:44.1 Mx	Donna Gould	Australia	13 July 1984		Eugene, United States	18 years, 33 days	
5000 m	15:21.76 (Note: outdoor best; indoor mark ratified as absolute record)	Amy Bunnage	Australia	6 May 2023	Sound Running On Track Fest	Walnut, United States	18 years, 45 days	
5000 m	15:18.6 h Mx	Eloise Poppett	Australia	16 October 1999		Sydney, Australia	16 years, 341 days	
10,000 m	34:28.46	Katie Swords	Australia	2 June 1996		Knoxville, United States		
10,000 m	32:39.30	Clare O'Brien	Australia	24 May 2018	NCAA West Preliminary Round	Sacramento, United States	19 years, 131 days	
10,000 m	34:15.0 h Mx	Donna Gould	Australia	18 December 1985		Adelaide, Australia	19 years, 191 days	
10 km (road)	34:27	Hollie Emery	Australia	2 May 2009	Sydney Striders Road Race	Sydney, Australia	18 years, 270 days	
10 km (road)	34:27	Katrina Robinson	New Zealand	1 July 2016	Southern Cross University 10km Run	Gold Coast, Australia	15 years, 328 days	
Half marathon	1:13:08	Danielle Trevis	New Zealand	31 October 2010	Auckland Half Marathon	Auckland, New Zealand	19 years, 285 days	
60 m hurdles	8.12 (+0.7 m/s)	Delta Amidzovski	Australia	1 February 2025	Australian Short Track Championships	Sydney, Australia	18 years, 162 days	
100 m hurdles	13.01 (+0.4 m/s)	Sally McLennan	Australia	26 November 2005		Brisbane, Australia	19 years, 68 days	
400 m hurdles	55.20	Jana Pittman	Australia	18 March 2000		Polokwane, South Africa	17 years, 130 days	
2000 m steeplechase	6:25.77	Melissa Rollison	Australia	1 May 2000		Sydney, Australia	17 years, 18 days	
3000 m steeplechase	9:30.70	Melissa Rollison	Australia	4 September 2001		Brisbane, Australia	18 years, 144 days	
High jump	1.96 m	Eleanor Patterson	Australia	15 March 2015	Australian Junior Championships	Sydney, Australia	18 years, 297 days	
High jump	1.96 m	Eleanor Patterson	Australia	7 December 2013	Australian All Schools Championships	Townsville, Australia	17 years, 199 days	
Pole vault	4.64 m	Eliza McCartney	New Zealand	19 December 2015	Auckland Summer Series 7 Meeting	Auckland, New Zealand	19 years, 8 days	
Long jump	6.60 m	Lyn Tillett	Australia	23 August 1972		Munich, Germany	19 years, 8 days	
Long jump	6.60 m (+1.1 m/s)	Brooke Stratton	Australia	3 July 2011	Mannheim Junior Gala	Mannheim, Germany	17 years, 356 days	
Triple jump	13.36 m (±0.0 m/s)	Linda Allen	Australia	8 July 2006		Gold Coast, Australia	19 years, 107 days	
Shot put	18.93 m	Valerie Adams	New Zealand	10 May 2003		Osaka, Japan	18 years, 216 days	
Discus throw	60.63 m	Dani Samuels	Australia	20 August 2006		Beijing, China	18 years, 86 days	
Hammer throw	65.75 m	Alexandra Hulley	Australia	29 May 2015		Sydney, Australia	17 years, 309 days	
Hammer throw	67.00 m	Julia Ratcliffe	New Zealand	14 July 2012	World Junior Championships	Barcelona, Spain	19 years, 0 days	
Javelin throw	57.60 m	Mackenzie Little	Australia	4 April 2014		Melbourne, Australia	17 years, 98 days	
Heptathlon	5915 pts	Celeste Mucci	Australia	12–13 April 2018	Commonwealth Games	Gold Coast, Australia	18 years, 245 days	
Heptathlon	100m H (wind) / High jump / Shot put / 200m (wind) / Long jump (wind) / Javelin / 800m; 13.19 (+0.6 m/s) / 1.75 m / 12.22 m / 24.59 (−0.4 m/s) / 6.10 m (−0.5 m/s) / 43.03 m / 2:29.73							
3000 m walk (track)	12:27.74	Jane Saville	Australia	25 February 1993		Melbourne, Australia	18 years, 112 days	
5000 m walk (track)	21:34.23	Natalie Saville	Australia	1 March 1997		Melbourne, Australia	18 years, 175 days	
5 km walk (road)	21:44.6	Natalie Saville	Australia	6 January 1996		Sydney, Australia	17 years, 121 days	
10,000 m walk (track)	43:20.65	Katie Hayward	Australia	5 April 2019		Sydney, Australia	18 years, 256 days	
10 km walk (road)	45:10	Natalie Saville	Australia	27 February 1997		Melbourne, Australia	18 years, 173 days	
20,000 m walk (track)	1:59:49	Angela Cousins	Australia	6 August 1995		Melbourne, Australia		
20 km walk (road)	1:29:25	Katie Hayward	Australia	10 February 2019		Adelaide, Australia	18 years, 202 days	
4 × 100 m relay	44.78	Nana Adoma Owusu-Afriyie; Kristie Edwards; Samantha Johnson; Mia Gross	Australia	14 July 2018	World U20 Championships	Tampere, Finland	19 years, 114 days 17 years, 87 days	
4 × 100 m relay	44.34	Chelsea Scolyer; Olivia Dodds; Zara Hagan; Jessica Milat	Australia	23 March 2024	Sydney Track Classic	Sydney, Australia		
4 × 200 m relay	1:38.41	Grdiner; Bannister; Turner; Morton	Australia	9 December 2007		Sydney, Australia		
4 × 400 m relay	3:30.38	Sophie Scamps; Renée Poetschka; Kylie Hanigan; Susan Andrews	Australia	12 August 1990	World Junior Championships	Plovdiv, Bulgaria	19 years, 103 days 18 years, 267 days 19 years, 78 days	
4 × 800 m relay	8:48.5 h	Dawson; Lonsdale; Stephens van Gorp	Australia	19 December 1989		Brisbane, Australia		
4 × 1500 m relay	18:22.87	L. Harding-Delooze; Evans; Hopper; A. Harding-Delooze	Australia	15 November 2015		Sydney, Australia		

=== Mixed ===
Event	Record	Athlete	Nationality	Date	Meet	Place	Age	Ref.
4 × 100 m relay	41.64	Uwezo Lubenda; Maya Taber; Kelechi Ekwomadu; Thewbelle Philp	Australia	6 August 2026	World U20 Championships	Eugene, United States	17 years, 195 days 17 years, 84 days 17 years, 305 days 18 years, 123 days	
4 × 400 m relay	3:25.08	Thomas; Oboya; Moir; Doris	Australia	23 July 2017		Nassau, Bahamas		
4 × 400 m relay	3:21.10	Jordan Gilbert; Bella Pasquali; Jack Deguara; Sophia Gregorevic	Australia	27 August 2024	World U20 Championships	Lima, Peru	17 years, 262 days 17 years, 328 days 19 years, 157 days 18 years, 296 days	
4 × 400 m relay	3:19.27	Jordan Gilbert; Bella Pasquali; Jack Deguara; Sophia Gregorevic	Australia	27 August 2024	World U20 Championships	Lima, Peru	17 years, 262 days 17 years, 328 days 19 years, 157 days 18 years, 296 days	
4 × 400 m relay	3:18.45	Dylan Ruming; Xanthee Watts; Fred Hamblin; Charlotte Mcauliffe	Australia	5 August 2026	World U20 Championships	Eugene, United States	16 years, 220 days 17 years, 78 days 18 years, 42 days 19 years, 171 days	

== Indoor ==
=== Men ===
Event	Record	Athlete	Nationality	Date	Meet	Place	Age	Ref.
60 m	6.63	Joshua Billington	New Zealand	5 December 2015		Staten Island, United States		
200 m	21.71	Joshua Billington	New Zealand	5 December 2015		Staten Island, United States		
400 m	47.20	Paul Greene	Australia	9 March 1991	World Championships	Seville, Spain	18 years, 90 days	
800 m	1:51.22	Angus Beer	Australia	26 February 2021		Fayetteville, United States		
800 m	1:50.46 OT	Angus Beer	Australia	13 February 2021		Nashville, United States		
1000 m	2:26.58	Rory Hunter	Australia	7 December 2012		Bloomington, United States		
1500 m	3:32.67+	Cameron Myers	Australia	8 February 2025	Millrose Games	New York City, United States	18 years, 244 days	
Mile	3:47.48	Cameron Myers	Australia	8 February 2025	Millrose Games	New York City, United States	18 years, 244 days	
3000 m	7:33.12	Cameron Myers	Australia	2 February 2025	New Balance Indoor Grand Prix	Boston, United States	18 years, 238 days	
5000 m	13:41.17	Christian de Vaal	New Zealand	7 December 2024	BU Sharon Colyear-Danville Season Opener	Boston, United States	19 years, 324 days	
60 m hurdles	8.55	Simon Thieury	French Polynesia	5 January 2008		Aubière, France		
60 m hurdles (99 cm)	7.48	Sasha Zhoya	Australia	24 February 2019		Liévin, France	16 years, 244 days	
High jump	2.28 m	Tim Forsyth	Australia	28 February 1991		Seville, Spain	17 years, 195 days	
High jump	2.28 m	Tim Forsyth	Australia	10 March 1991	World Championships	Seville, Spain	17 years, 205 days	
Pole vault	5.32 m	Sasha Zhoya	Australia	23 February 2019	French U18 Championships	Liévin, France	16 years, 243 days	
Long jump	7.595 m	Ken Lorraway	Australia	10 March 1991			35 years, 32 days	
Triple jump	15.46 m	Dylan James	Australia	27 February 2021		Colorado Springs, United States		
Shot put	17.50 m	Alexander Kolesnikof	Australia	7 December 2019		Cambridge, United States		
Shot put (6 kg)	21.43 m	Jacko Gill	New Zealand	20 April 2013		Sätra, Sweden	18 years, 121 days	
Heptathlon	4903 pts	Ben Collerton	New Zealand	21 February 2017	Sun Belt Championships	Birmingham, United States	18 years, 305 days	
Heptathlon	60m / Long jump / Shot put / High jump / 60m H / Pole vault / 1000m; 7.35 / 6.45 m / 10.82 m / 1.94 m / 8.67 / 3.90 m / 2:50.44							
5000 m walk								
4 × 400 m relay								

=== Women ===
Event	Record	Athlete	Nationality	Date	Meet	Place	Age	Ref.
60 m	7.39	Celeste Mucci	Australia	18 February 2017	Simplot Games	Pocatello, United States	17 years, 191 days	
200 m	23.74	Lauren Hewitt	Australia	7 March 1997	World Championships	Paris, France	18 years, 102 days	
400 m	56.74	Katrina Anderson	New Zealand	17 February 2011		Fayetteville, United States		
800 m	2:08.52 y	Christine McMiken	New Zealand	24 January 1982		Kansas City, United States	18 years, 219 days	
1000 m	2:53.43	Kimberley May	New Zealand	28 January 2022		Boston, United States		
1000 m	2:46.14 OT	Lilli Burdon	New Zealand	14 January 2017 (Note: by official result source; 14 January 1997 by OAA source, a typo)	UW Indoor Preview	Seattle, United States	18 years, 354 days	
1500 m	4:13.21	Georgie Clarke	Australia	10 March 2001	World Championships	Lisbon, Portugal	16 years, 266 days	
Mile	4:38.80	Lilli Burdon	New Zealand	28 January 2017	Columbia East-West Challenge	New York City, United States	19 years, 2 days	
Mile	4:36.98 OT	Lilli Burdon	New Zealand	11 February 2017	Husky Classic	Seattle, United States	19 years, 16 days	
3000 m	9:08.57	Melany Smart	Australia	28 February 2020	BU Last Chance Invitational	Boston, United States	18 years, 279 days	
3000 m	9:06.52 OT	Melany Smart	Australia	14 February 2020	Husky Classic	Seattle, United States	18 years, 265 days	
5000 m	15:00.75	Amy Bunnage	Australia	7 December 2024	BU Sharon Colyear-Danville Season Opener	Boston, United States	19 years, 260 days	
60 m hurdles	8.26	Celeste Mucci	Australia	17 February 2017	Simplot Games	Pocatello, United States	17 years, 190 days	
High jump	1.91 m	Gai Kapernick	Australia	5 March 1989	World Championships	Budapest, Hungary	18 years, 166 days	
Pole vault								
Long jump	6.04 m A	Tay-Leiha Clark	Australia	10 February 2017		Albuquerque, United States		
Triple jump	12.63 m A	Tay-Leiha Clark	Australia	11 February 2017		Albuquerque, United States		
Shot put	15.37 m	Marley Raikiwasa	Australia	20 January 2024	Vanderbilt Invitational	Nashville, United States	18 years, 166 days	
Weight throw	17.72 m	Stephanie Ratcliffe	Australia	7 February 2019		Cambridge, United States	18 years, 40 days	
Pentathlon	3860 pts OT	Melissa-Maree Farrington	Australia	28 February 2014		Geneva, United States		
Pentathlon	60m H / High jump / Shot put / Long jump / 800m							
3000 m walk	14:14.21	Amanda Gorst	New Zealand	9 February 2006		Boone, United States		
4 × 400 m relay								
