= 2024 World Athletics U20 Championships – Women's 200 metres =

Women's 200 metres at the 2024 World Athletics U20 Championships
- Venue: Estadio Atlético de la VIDENA
- Dates: 29 August 2024 (heats & semi-finals); 30 August 2024 (final)
- Competitors: 46 from 34 nations
- Winning time: 22.88

Medalists
gold medal	Torrie Lewis	Australia
silver medal	Shanoya Douglas	Jamaica
bronze medal	Jessica Milat	Australia

The women's 200 metres at the 2024 World Athletics U20 Championships was held at the Estadio Atlético de la VIDENA in Lima, Peru on 29 and 30 August 2024.

== Records ==
U20 standing records prior to the 2024 World Athletics U20 Championships were as follows:

Record	Athlete & Nationality	Mark	Location	Date
World U20 Record	Christine Mboma (NAM)	21.81	Tokyo, Japan	3 August 2021
Championship Record	Christine Mboma (NAM)	21.84	Nairobi, Kenya	21 August 2021
World U20 Leading	JaMeesia Ford (USA)	22.08	Eugene, United States	8 June 2024

== Results ==
=== Heats ===
The first 3 athletes in each heat (Q) and the next 6 fastest (q) qualified to the semi-finals.

==== Heat 1 ====
Rank	Lane	Athlete	Nation	Time	Notes
1	2	Taylor Snaer	United States	23.48	Q
2	8	Sabrina Dockery	Jamaica	23.80	Q
3	7	Dana Jiménez	Colombia	23.82	Q, PB
4	3	Inga Kanicka	Poland	24.15	
5	6	Lara Jurčić	Croatia	24.31	
6	5	Antonia Ramirez	Chile	24.47	
7	4	Khrystyna Fedushchak	Ukraine	24.56	
8	9	Yau Sin Ting	Hong Kong	24.99	
				Wind: -0.9 m/s	

==== Heat 2 ====
Rank	Lane	Athlete	Nation	Time	Notes
1	5	Shanoya Douglas	Jamaica	23.51	Q
2	7	Dianna Proctor	Canada	23.70	Q
3	3	Alexa Sulyán	Hungary	23.76	Q
4	4	Elisa Marcello	Italy	24.05	q
5	8	Ioana-Adnana Vrînceanu	Romania	24.46	
6	2	Hakelly da Silva	Brazil	24.54	
7	6	Nalicia Glen	Guyana	25.20	
				Wind: +0.6 m/s	

==== Heat 3 ====
Rank	Lane	Athlete	Nation	Time	Notes
1	2	Adaejah Hodge	British Virgin Islands	23.19	Q
2	5	Chane Vermeulen	South Africa	23.70	Q
3	7	Terezie Táborská	Czech Republic	23.76	Q
4	8	Beynailis Romero	Venezuela	24.05	q
5	6	Athaleyha Hinckson	Guyana	24.46	
6	4	Melissa Turchi	Italy	24.54	
7	3	Stefany Julio	Colombia	25.20	
				Wind: -0.2 m/s	

==== Heat 4 ====
Rank	Lane	Athlete	Nation	Time	Notes
1	8	Lia Thalmann	Switzerland	24.23	Q
2	7	Shana Lambourde	France	24.28	Q
3	9	Lina Hribar	Slovenia	24.35	Q
4	3	Precious Nzeakor	Nigeria	24.75	
5	5	Neeru Pahtak	India	24.77	
6	2	Alexis Roberts	Bahamas	24.82	
7	6	Romana Hrnčárová	Slovakia	25.39	
–	4	Viwe Jingqi	South Africa	DNS	
				Wind: -0.9 m/s	

==== Heat 5 ====
Rank	Lane	Athlete	Nation	Time	Notes
1	9	Torrie Lewis	Australia	23.27	Q
2	6	Renee Regis	Great Britain	23.56	Q
3	8	Pika Bikar Kern	Slovenia	23.91	Q
4	2	Ashley Odiase	Canada	23.94	q
5	3	Elena Schernhardt	Germany	24.01	q
6	4	Sethunya Majama	Botswana	24.31	
7	7	Frederik Voss Vestergaard	Denmark	24.47	
8	5	Bianca Conroy	Peru	31.74	
				Wind: -0.7 m/s	

==== Heat 6 ====
Rank	Lane	Athlete	Nation	Time	Notes
1	7	Jessica Milat	Australia	23.29	Q
2	3	Liu Yinglam	China	23.54	Q
3	5	Elise Cooper	United States	23.61	Q
4	6	Judith Mokobe	Germany	23.87	q
5	9	Kissiwaa Mensah	Great Britain	23.92	q
6	8	Unnathi Bolland	India	24.10	
7	2	Marielle Venida	New Zealand	24.18	
8	4	Zinad Joseph	ART	27.11	SB
				Wind: -0.6 m/s	

=== Semi-finals ===
The first 2 athletes in each heat (Q) and the next 2 fastest (q) qualified to the final.

==== Heat 1 ====
Rank	Lane	Athlete	Nation	Time	Notes
1	7	Jessica Milat	Australia	23.42	Q
2	6	Taylor Snaer	United States	23.70	Q
3	4	Chane Vermeulen	South Africa	23.78	
4	2	kissiwaa Mensah	Great Britain	23.90	
5	8	Dianna Proctor	Canada	23.95	
6	9	Dana Jiménez	Colombia	24.12	
7	3	Beynailis Romero	Venezuela	24.33	
8	5	Terezie Táborská	Czech Republic	24.50	
				Wind: +0.4 m/s	

==== Heat 2 ====
Rank	Lane	Athlete	Nation	Time	Notes
1	7	Adaejah Hodge	British Virgin Islands	23.18	Q
2	8	Liu Yinglam	China	23.30	Q, PB
3	4	Elise Cooper	United States	23.43	q
4	9	Sabrina Dockery	Jamaica	23.75	
5	3	Judith Mokobe	Germany	23.86	
6	2	Elisa Marcello	Italy	24.28	
7	6	Lia Thalmann	Switzerland	24.29	
8	5	Lina Hribar	Slovenia	24.65	
				Wind: -0.6 m/s	

==== Heat 3 ====
Rank	Lane	Athlete	Nation	Time	Notes
1	6	Torrie Lewis	Australia	23.14	Q
2	8	Shanoya Douglas	Jamaica	23.34	Q
3	7	Renee Regis	Great Britain	23.54	q
4	4	Alexa Sulyán	Hungary	23.96	
5	9	Pika Bikar Kern	Slovenia	24.19	
6	2	Elena Schernhardt	Germany	24.30	
7	3	Ashley Odiase	Canada	24.32	
8	5	Shana Lambourde	France	24.48	
				Wind: -0.6 m/s	

=== Final ===
Rank	Lane	Athlete	Nation	Time	Notes
1st place, gold medalist(s)	6	Torrie Lewis	Australia	22.88	PB
2nd place, silver medalist(s)	5	Shanoya Douglas	Jamaica	23.10	
3rd place, bronze medalist(s)	8	Jessica Milat	Australia	23.21	PB
4	9	Taylor Snaer	United States	23.31	
5	3	Renee Regis	Great Britain	23.38	
6	4	Liu Yinglam	China	23.39	
7	2	Elise Cooper	United States	23.40	
	~~7~~	~~Adaejah Hodge~~	~~British Virgin Islands~~	~~22.74~~	DQ
				Wind: -0.7 m/s	
