= 2025 Millrose Games =

Indoor athletics meeting in New York City

- Dates: 8 February 2025
- Host city: New York City, New York, United States
- Venue: Fort Washington Avenue Armory
- Level: 2025 World Athletics Indoor Tour

The 2025 Millrose Games was the 117th edition of the annual indoor track and field meeting in New York City. Held on 8 February at the Fort Washington Armory in Upper Manhattan, it was the sixth leg of the 2025 World Athletics Indoor Tour Gold series – the highest-level international indoor track and field circuit.

== Highlights ==
Two world indoor records were set at the meeting. In the men's 3000 meters, Grant Fisher broke Lamecha Girma's world indoor record of 7:23.81, running 7:22.91. Running against Fisher was Cole Hocker, who took the lead with three laps to go, but was out-kicked by Fisher in the final straightaway. Hocker ran 7:23.14, the second-fastest indoor time in history and also under the previous world indoor record.

The second world indoor record came in the men's Wanamaker Mile, where Yared Nuguse broke Yomif Kejelcha's world indoor record of 3:47.01, running 3:46.63. Also under the previous indoor record was Hobbs Kessler, who ran 3:46.90. Cameron Myers set an Australian national indoor record and a world under-20 indoor record of 3:47.48, Azeddine Habz set a French national indoor record of 3:47.56, and Andrew Coscoran ran an Irish national indoor record of 3:49.26.

In the men's 800 meters, Josh Hoey set a new American indoor record of 1:43.90, breaking Donavan Brazier's national indoor record of 1:44.21. Bryce Hoppel also finished under this record, running 1:44.19. Cooper Lutkenhaus broke Hoey's high school national indoor record of 1:47.67, running 1:46.86.

In the men's 600 meters, Will Sumner set a meet record of 1:14.04.

In the women's mile, Sadie Engelhardt broke Mary Cain's high school indoor mile record of 4:28.25, running 4:27.97.

== Results ==
=== World Athletics Indoor Tour ===
Women's 60m hurdles
Place	Athlete	Country	Time	Points
1st place, gold medalist(s)	Masai Russell	United States	7.76	10
2nd place, silver medalist(s)	Grace Stark	United States	7.82	7
3rd place, bronze medalist(s)	Devynne Charlton	Bahamas	7.83	5
4	Denisha Cartwright	Bahamas	7.84	3
5	Taylor Cox	United States	8.21	
6	Camylin Blake	United States	8.63	
7	Ackera Nugent	Jamaica	FS	

Men's 60m hurdles
Place	Athlete	Country	Time	Points
1st place, gold medalist(s)	Dylan Beard	United States	7.38	10
2nd place, silver medalist(s)	Cordell Tinch	United States	7.43	7
3rd place, bronze medalist(s)	Cameron Murray	United States	7.52	5
4	De'Vion Wilson	United States	7.57	3
5	Eric Edwards Jr.	United States	7.64	
6	Freddie Crittenden	United States	7.68	
7	Edward Williams Jr.	United States	7.78	
8	Greg Foster	United States	7.99	

Women's 60 meters
Place	Athlete	Country	Time	Points
1st place, gold medalist(s)	Jacious Sears	United States	7.02	10
2nd place, silver medalist(s)	Celera Barnes	United States	7.15	7
3rd place, bronze medalist(s)	Aleia Hobbs	United States	7.16	5
4	Destiny Smith-Barnett	Liberia	7.18	3
5	Jodean Williams	Jamaica	7.19	
6	Zoe Hobbs	New Zealand	7.20 (7.191)	
7	Audrey Leduc	Canada	7.20 (7.198)	
8	Lisa Raye	Trinidad and Tobago	7.21	
9	Mikiah Brisco	United States	7.24	

Men's 60 meters
Place	Athlete	Country	Time	Points
1st place, gold medalist(s)	Marcellus Moore	United States	6.56	10
2nd place, silver medalist(s)	Trayvon Bromell	United States	6.59	7
3rd place, bronze medalist(s)	Pjai Austin	United States	6.61	5
4	Benjamin Azamati	Ghana	6.63	3
5	Miles Lewis	Puerto Rico	6.64	
6	J.T. Smith	United States	6.67	
7	Nigel Green	United States	6.69	

Men's 3000 meters
Place	Athlete	Country	Time	Points
1st place, gold medalist(s)	Grant Fisher	United States	7:22.91 WR	10
2nd place, silver medalist(s)	Cole Hocker	United States	7:23.14	7
3rd place, bronze medalist(s)	Jimmy Gressier	France	7:30.18	5
4	Ky Robinson	Australia	7:30.38	3
5	Dylan Jacobs	United States	7:30.45	
6	Cooper Teare	United States	7:30.62	
7	Olin Hacker	United States	7:38.52	
8	Adam Fogg	Great Britain	7:40.84	
9	Oliver Hoare	Australia	7:45.42	
10	Stewart McSweyn	Australia	7:45.46	
11	Sean McGorty	United States	7:47.97	
	Casey Comber	United States	DNF	
	Jack Salisbury	United States	DNF	

Women's 800 meters
Place	Athlete	Country	Time	Points
1st place, gold medalist(s)	Shafiqua Maloney	Saint Vincent and the Grenadines	1:59.07	10
2nd place, silver medalist(s)	Olivia Baker	United States	2:00.02	7
3rd place, bronze medalist(s)	Kaela Edwards	United States	2:00.14 (2:00.132)	5
4	Addy Wiley	United States	2:00.14 (2:00.133)	3
5	Sage Hurta-Klecker	United States	2:00.42	
6	McKenna Keegan	United States	2:00.72	
7	Nia Akins	United States	2:00.91	
8	Samantha Watson	United States	2:02.00	
9	Natoya Goule-Toppin	Jamaica	2:02.53	
	Brittany Ogunmokun	Nigeria	DNF	

Men's 600 meters
Place	Athlete	Country	Time	Points
1st place, gold medalist(s)	Will Sumner	United States	1:14.04	10
2nd place, silver medalist(s)	Isaiah Jewett	United States	1:14.17	7
3rd place, bronze medalist(s)	Brandon Miller	United States	1:14.37	5
4	Quincy Wilson	United States	1:16.20	3
5	Luciano Fiore	United States	1:16.37	

Women's 3000 meters
Place	Athlete	Country	Time	Points
1st place, gold medalist(s)	Whittni Morgan	United States	8:28.03	10
2nd place, silver medalist(s)	Josette Andrews	United States	8:29.77	7
3rd place, bronze medalist(s)	Sarah Healy	Ireland	8:30.79	5
4	Jessica Hull	Australia	8:30.91	3
5	Tsigie Gebreselama	Ethiopia	8:33.13	
6	Nozomi Tanaka	Japan	8:33.52	
7	Olivia Markezich	United States	8:37.37	
8	Ella Donaghu	United States	8:38.75	
9	Gabbi Jennings	United States	8:47.02	
10	Katelyn Tuohy	United States	8:47.34	
11	Hilda Olemomoi	Kenya	8:51.05	
12	Courtney Wayment	United States	8:56.57	
13	Axumawit Embaye	Ethiopia	9:01.64	
	Laurie Barton	United States	DNF	

Women's 400 meters
Place	Athlete	Country	Time	Points
1st place, gold medalist(s)	Alexis Holmes	United States	51.21	10
2nd place, silver medalist(s)	Leah Anderson	Jamaica	52.12	7
3rd place, bronze medalist(s)	Helena Ponette	Belgium	52.16	5
4	Jan'Taijah Jones	United States	52.67	3
5	Meghan Hunter	United States	53.01	

Men's 800 meters
Place	Athlete	Country	Time	Points
1st place, gold medalist(s)	Josh Hoey	United States	1:43.90	10
2nd place, silver medalist(s)	Bryce Hoppel	United States	1:44.19	7
3rd place, bronze medalist(s)	Jonah Koech	United States	1:44.82	5
4	Mark English	Ireland	1:45.15	3
5	Alex Amankwah	Ghana	1:45.82	
6	Cooper Lutkenhaus	United States	1:46.86	
7	Shane Cohen	United States	1:47.01	
	Austin Rios-Colon	Puerto Rico	DNF	

Women's Wanamaker Mile
Place	Athlete	Country	Time	Points
1st place, gold medalist(s)	Georgia Bell	Great Britain	4:23.35	10
2nd place, silver medalist(s)	Heather MacLean	United States	4:23.41	7
3rd place, bronze medalist(s)	Nikki Hiltz	United States	4:23.50	5
4	Susan Ejore	Kenya	4:23.64	3
5	Sinclaire Johnson	United States	4:23.93	
6	Linden Hall	Australia	4:24.58	
7	Maia Ramsden	New Zealand	4:25.46	
8	Simone Plourde	Canada	4:25.71	
9	Wilma Nielsen	Sweden	4:25.78	
10	Sinta Vissa	Italy	4:26.39	
11	Sadie Engelhardt	United States	4:27.97	
12	Elise Cranny	United States	4:30.64	
	Emily Richards	United States	DNF	

Men's Wanamaker Mile
Place	Athlete	Country	Time	Points
1st place, gold medalist(s)	Yared Nuguse	United States	3:46.63 WR	10
2nd place, silver medalist(s)	Hobbs Kessler	United States	3:46.90	7
3rd place, bronze medalist(s)	Cameron Myers	Australia	3:47.48	5
4	Azeddine Habz	France	3:47.56	3
5	Gary Martin	United States	3:48.82	
6	Neil Gourley	Great Britain	3:49.22	
7	Andrew Coscoran	Ireland	3:49.26	
8	Robert Farken	Germany	3:49.93	
9	Jochem Vermeulen	Belgium	3:53.68	
10	Vincent Ciattei	United States	3:55.04	
11	Henry Wynne	United States	3:55.52	
	Abe Alvarado	United States	DNF	
