= Renee Regis =

British athlete

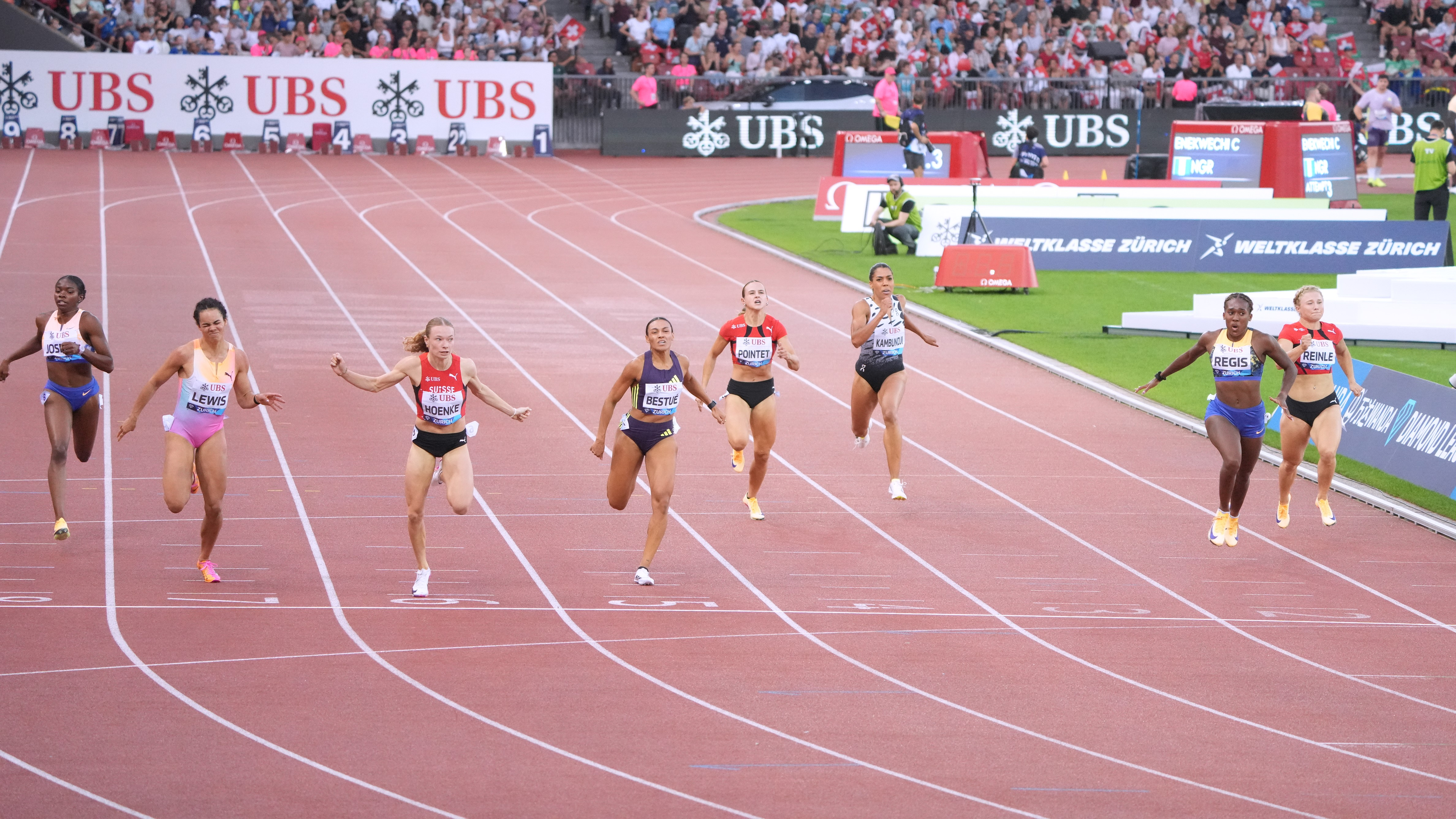
- Regis in 2026

Personal information
- Nationality: Great Britain
- Born: 2 September 2005 (age 21)

Sport
- Sport: Athletics
- Event: Sprint

Achievements and titles
- Personal bests: 60m: 7.39 (Sheffield, 2023); 100m: 11.18 (London, 2025); 200m: 22.67 (London, 2025)
Medal record
Women's athletics
Representing Great Britain
European U20 Championships
Silver medal – second place	2023 Jerusalem	100m
Silver medal – second place	2023 Jerusalem	4x100m

Renee Regis (born 2 September 2005) is a British track and field athlete who competes as a sprinter. She won the 200 metres title at the 2026 British Indoor Athletics Championships.

== Biography ==
Regis won bronze in the individual 100m and gold in the relay medley at the 2022 European under-18 championships.

She was selected for the Great Britain and Northern Ireland team to compete at the 2023 European Athletics U20 Championships in Jerusalem, Israel in August 2023. She lowered her personal best over 100m to 11.36s at the event. In the final she won the 100m silver medal in a British one-two with Joy Eze. Eze and Regis were then part of a 4 × 100 m relay team that won silver at the championships.

In July 2024 she won the 200 metres at the English U20 Championships in Birmingham. She was selected for the 200 metres at the 2024 World Athletics U20 Championships in Lima, Peru where she placed sixth in the final. In November 2024, she was named by British Athletics on the Olympic Futures Programme for 2025.

She ran a personal best 11.32 seconds to win the 100 metres at the Loughborough International in May 2025. On 2 August, she finished sixth in the final of the 100 metres at the 2025 UK Athletics Championships in Birmingham in 11.38 seconds. She returned the following day to finish in fifth place in the 200 metres, in a personal best 22.68 seconds. In October 2025, she was retained on the British Athletics Olympic Futures Programme for 2025/26.

On 15 February 2026, Regis won the British national title over 200 metres at the 2026 British Indoor Athletics Championships. On her way to the title, Regis won her semi-final in 22.89 seconds to move to third on the British all-time indoor list. As well as breaking the championship record which had been set by Merlene Ottey running as a guest in 1990, she became the first woman to run below 23 seconds at the championships. At the conclusion of the race, her father John was part of the medal ceremony, which she described as "a nice moment…he didn’t tell me he was doing it".

Regis was named in the British squad for the 4 x 100 metres relay at the 2026 World Athletics Relays in Gaborone, Botswana, making her senior international debut in the women's 4 x 100 m relay as the team qualified for the 2027 World Championships. On 20 June, Regis placed fifth in the final of the 100 metres at the 2026 UK Championships. In July 2026, she was selected to represent England at the 2026 Commonwealth Games in Glasgow, and competed in the women's 4 × 100 m relay. In October 2026, she was retained on the 2026/27 Olympic Futures Programme awarded by UK Athletics. Regis was nominated for Young sportswoman of the Year by The Sunday Times.

== Personal life ==
From London, she is the daughter of British international athletes Jennifer Stoute and John Regis. Her sister Alicia also competes as an athlete. Renee was a keen netball player before concentrating on athletics. She studies finance and accounting at Brunel University.

== Athletics achievements ==
=== Personal bests ===
Type	Distance	Time (s)	Wind (m/s)	Venue	Date	Notes
Individual events
Indoor	60 metres	7.39	—N/a	Sheffield, United Kingdom	11 February 2023	
Indoor	200 metres sh	22.89	—N/a	Birmingham, United Kingdom	15 February 2026	
Outdoor	100 metres	11.18	+1.9	London, United Kingdom	26 May 2025	
Outdoor	200 metres	22.67	+1.3	London, United Kingdom	17 August 2025	
Outdoor	300 metres	37.36	—N/a	Miramar, United States	4 April 2026	
Team events
Outdoor	4 × 100 metres relay	42.90	—N/a	Gaborone, Botswana	3 May 2026	
Outdoor	4x400 metres relay	3:39.73	—N/a	Gainesville, United States	5 April 2025	
Outdoor	1000m sprint medley relay	2:07.18	—N/a	Jerusalem, Israel	7 July 2022	

=== International competitions ===
Representing Great Britain & England
Year	Competition	Venue	Position	Event	Time
2022	European U18 Championships	Jerusalem, Israel	3rd	100 m	11.58
2022	European U18 Championships	Jerusalem, Israel	1st	Swedish Medley relay	2:07.18
2023	European U20 Championships	Jerusalem, Israel	2nd	100 m	11.40
2023	European U20 Championships	Jerusalem, Israel	2nd	4 x 100 m relay	43.82
2024	World U20 Championships	Lima, Peru	5th	200 m	23.38
2026	Commonwealth Games	Glasgow, United Kingdom	5th	4 x 100 m relay	43.45

=== National championships and competitions ===
Year	Competition	Venue	Position	Event	Time
2021	England Championships, U17 events	Manchester	3rd	100 m	11.84
2022	England Indoor Championships, U17 events	Sheffield	1st	60 m	7.46
2022	England Indoor Championships, U17 events	Sheffield	1st	200 m	23.93
2022	England Championships, U18 events	Bedford	1st	100 m	11.58
2023	England Indoor Championships, U20 events	Sheffield	2nd	60 m	7.41
2023	England Championships, U20 events	Chelmsford	3rd	100 m	11.63
2024	British Championships	Manchester	9th (sf)	100 m	11.43
2024	England Championships, U20 events	Birmingham	1st	200 m	23.15
2025	British Indoor Championships	Birmingham	6th	60 m	7.42
2025	Wales Championships, U23 events	Cardiff	1st	100 m	11.35
2025	Wales Championships, U23 events	Cardiff	3rd	200 m	23.04
2025	British Championships	Birmingham	6th	100 m	11.38
2025	British Championships	Birmingham	5th	200 m	22.68
2026	British Indoor Championships	Birmingham	1st	200 m	22.95
2026	British Championships	Birmingham	5th	100 m	11.31
2026	British Championships	Birmingham	11th (h)	200 m	23.53
