= Marley Raikiwasa =

Australian athlete (born 2005)

Personal information
- Nationality: Australian
- Born: 7 August 2005 (age 20)

Sport
- Sport: Athletics
- Events: Shot put, Discus throw

Achievements and titles
- Personal bests: Discus: 57.42m (2024); Shot put: 16.84m (2024)AU20R
Medal record
Women's athletics
Representing Australia
World U20 Championships
| Bronze medal – third place | 2024 Lima | Discus |

Marley Raikiwasa (born 7 August 2005) is an Australian discus thrower and shot putter.

== Early life ==
She is from the City of Tea Tree Gully in South Australia. She was a member of Tea Tree Gully Athletics Centre. She attended Auburn University in the United States.

== Career ==
She finished ninth in the discus throw at the 2022 World Athletics U20 Championships in Cali, Colombia.

In May 2024, she set a new Australian U20 national record in the shot put of 16.84m. She increased her discus personal best to 57.42 metres in 2024 and competed in the discus throw at the NCAA finals in 2024. She won the bronze medal in the discus throw at the 2024 World Athletics U20 Championships in Lima, Peru with a throw of 56.25 metres.

In July 2026, she placed sixth in the shot put at the 2026 Commonwealth Games in Glasgow, Scotland.

== Personal life ==
She is part-Fijian. She has a black belt in Karate.
