= Alex Epitropakis =

Australian athlete (born 2005)

Personal information
- Born: 30 November 2005 (age 20)

Sport
- Sport: Athletics
- Event: Long jump

Achievements and titles
- Personal best(s): Long jump: 7.96m (Melbourne, 2026)
Medal record
Men's athletics
Representing Australia
Oceania Championships
| Gold medal – first place | 2026 Darwin | Long jump |

Alex Epitropakis (born 30 December 2005) is an Australian long jumper. He won the gold medal at the 2026 Oceania Athletics Championships.

== Biography ==
From Brisbane, Queensland, Epitropakis was a finalist in the triple jump competing for Australia at the 2024 World Athletics U20 Championships in Lima, Peru.

In July 2025, Epitropakis jumped 7.60 metres to qualify for the final at the 2025 Summer World University Games in Bochum, Germany, placing tenth overall.

On 28 March 2026, Epitropakis jumped a personal best 7.96 metres to win the Maurie Plant Meet in Melbourne ahead of Liam Adcock. The following month, he jumped 7.80 metres to place fourth at the Australian Championships. He was selected for the long jump as part of the Australian team to compete at the 2026 Oceania Athletics Championships in Darwin, Northern Territory, winning the gold medal in the long jump with a best jump of 7.91m (+0.5) after starting the competition with two fouls.
