= Elise Cooper =

American athlete (born 2007)

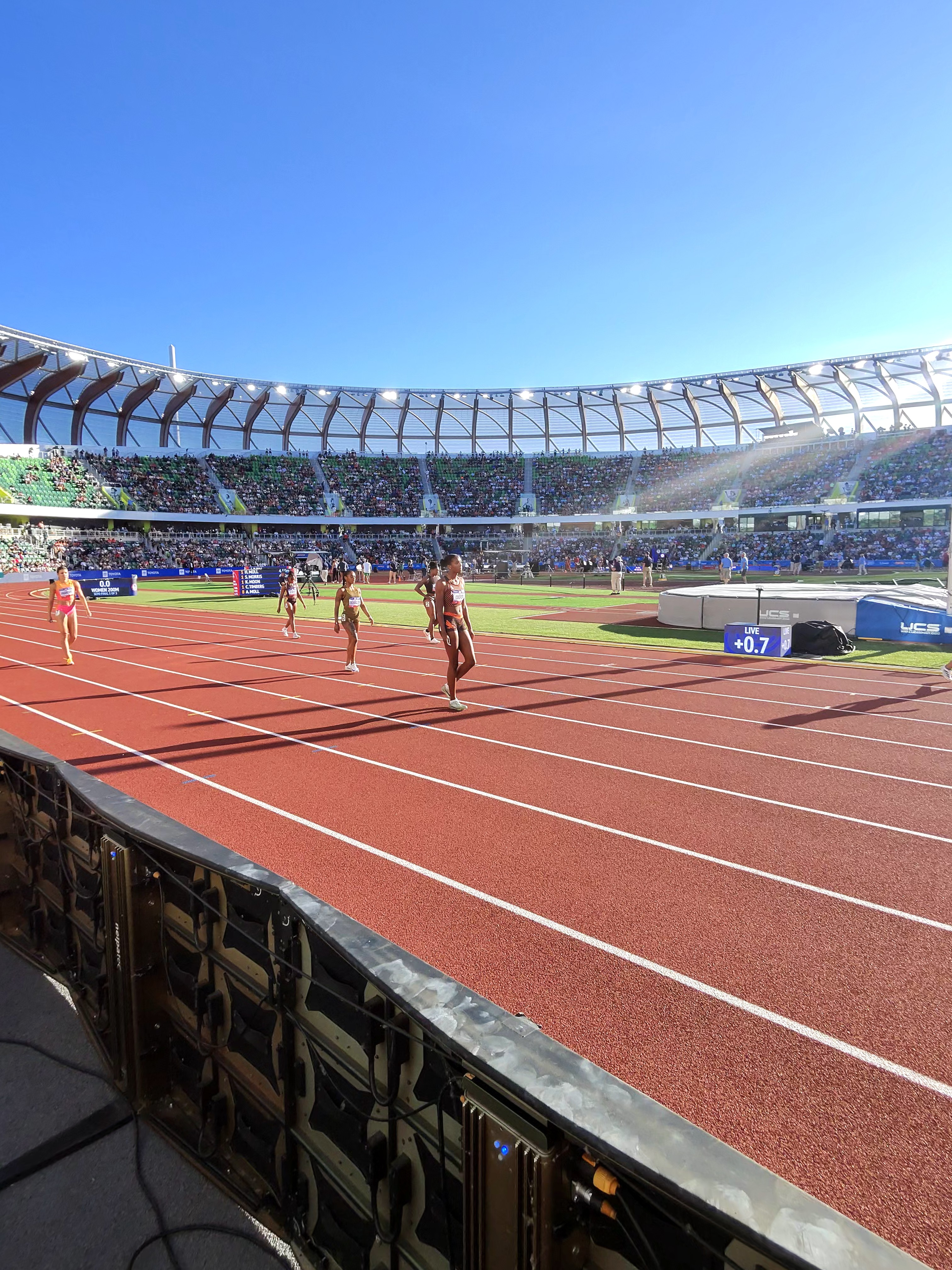
- Cooper in 2024

Personal information
- Born: 7 February 2007 (age 19)

Sport
- Sport: Athletics
- Event: Sprint

Achievements and titles
- Personal best(s): 100m: 11.44 (2023); 200m: 22.44 (2025); 400m: 51.24 (2026)
Medal record
Women's athletics
Representing United States
Pan American U20 Championships
Silver medal – second place	2023 Mayagüez	200 m

Elise Cooper (born 7 February 2007) is an American sprinter.

== Early and personal life ==
Cooper is from Owings Mills, Maryland and attended McDonogh High School. Her coaches include her mother Daniella. Her twin sister Elena and older sister Ella also compete in track events at Owings Mills Track Club. In May 2025, Cooper signed a Name, Image and Likeness (NIL) deal with Puma.

== Career ==
Cooper was a silver medalist in the 200 metres at the 2023 Pan American U20 Championships, setting a Maryland state record with a time of 22.80 seconds. She reached the 200 metres semi finals at the 2024 US Olympic Trials, at the age of 17 years-old. She was a finalist representing the United States over 200 metres at the 2024 World Athletics U20 Championships in Lima, Peru.

In April 2025, Cooper won over 100 metres and 400 metres at the All American Track Classic, setting a meet record in the 400 m, with a time of 52.33 seconds, a personal best. The previous meet record was 53.71, and her previous personal best was 54.01. She won the 100 m in 11.40, equaling her personal best. In June 2025, she won the New Balance Outdoor National Championships in the 200 metres with a time of 22.44 seconds, moving her to fifth on the all-time American high school list in her final race as a high schooler, before attending the University of Texas.

Competing for Texas in February 2026, Cooper placed fourth in 22.80 seconds in the 200 metres final at the 2026 SEC Indoor Championships. She was a finalist in the 200 m at the 2026 NCAA Division I Indoor Track and Field Championships.
