= Olivia Dodds =

Australian athlete (born 2006)

Personal information
- Born: 2 June 2006 (age 20)

Sport
- Sport: Athletics
- Event: Sprint

Achievements and titles
- Personal bests: 60m: 7.17 (2026); 100m: 11:30 (2026); 200m: 23.68 (2023)

Olivia Dodds (born 2 June 2006) is an Australian sprinter.

== Biography ==
From Perth, Western Australia she started athletics at Dale Little Athletics Centre and later became a member of UWA Athletics Club. At the 2021 Australian national championships she won gold in the under-16 categories of the 200 metres and silver in the 90m hurdles, as well as being on the winning team in the U16 4 × 100 m relay. She ran 23.91 in the 200m in November 2021, which equalled the Western Australian State record for under-16 girls and met the world under-20 championship qualifying time, at the age of 15 years old. That season in the 100 metres she had another under-20 qualifying time of 11.78.

In December 2023, she won the sprint double at the 2023 Australian All Schools Championships in Perth. In February 2024, she matched her personal best for the 100m by clocking 11.48 seconds. She was part of the 4 × 100 m relay team which set an Oceania Under-20 record alongside Chelsea Scolyer, Jessica Milat and Zara Hagan at the Sydney Classic in March 2024. In May 2024, she travelled as a member of the Australian relay pool for the 2024 World Athletics Relays in Nassau, Bahamas. Later that year, she was named in the Australian team for the 2024 World Athletics U20 Championships in Lima, Peru.

In April 2025, she won the 100 metres title at the Australian Athletics U20 Championships, in a time of 11.54 seconds. Aged 18 years-old, she went into the senior Australian Championships as the sixth-quickest women in Australia over 100m for the season, and was a semi-finalist at the Championships in Perth.

She was a member of the Australian team in the Mixed 4 × 100 m relay at the 2025 World Athletics Relays which qualified for the final on the first day of the competition. She then ran in the final as the Australia team went on to finish in fourth place overall in the event.

In Canberra in January 2026, Dodds won over 60 metres and 100 metres at the Capital Athletics Open and Under 20 Championships. Competing at the 2026 Maurie Plant Meet in Melbourne she was joint runner-up in the 100 metres to Ebony Lane in 11.56 seconds.
