= 2024 World Athletics U20 Championships – Men's triple jump =

Men's triple jump at the 2024 World Athletics U20 Championships
- Venue: Estadio Atlético de la VIDENA
- Dates: 27 August 2024 (qualification); 29 August 2024 (final)
- Competitors: 20 from 17 nations
- Winning distance: 17.01 m

Medalists
gold medal	Ethan Olivier	New Zealand
silver medal	Karson Gordon	United States
bronze medal	Ma Yinglong	China

The men's triple jump at the 2024 World Athletics U20 Championships was held at the Estadio Atlético de la VIDENA in Lima, Peru on 27 and 29 August 2024.

== Records ==
U20 standing records prior to the 2024 World Athletics U20 Championships were as follows:

Record	Athlete & Nationality	Mark	Location	Date
World U20 Record	Jaydon Hibbert (JAM)	17.54	Albuquerque, United States	11 March 2023
World U20 Record	Jaydon Hibbert (JAM)	17.66*	Fontvieille, Monaco	21 July 2023
Championship Record	Jaydon Hibbert (JAM)	17.22	Cali, Colombia	5 August 2022
World U20 Leading	Jaydon Hibbert (JAM)	17.75	Kingston, Jamaica	1 June 2024

*Mark pending ratification

== Results ==
=== Qualification ===
The qualification round took place on 27 August, in two groups, with both Group A and B scheduled to start at 12:05. Athletes attaining a mark of at least 16.00 metres (Q) or at least the 12 best performers (q) qualified for the final.

==== Group A ====
Rank	Athlete	Nation	Round			Mark	Notes
Rank	Athlete	Nation	1	2	3	Mark	Notes
1	Ethan Oliver	New Zealand	16.37			16.37	Q
2	Karson Gordon	United States	15.50	16.19		16.19	Q, PB
3	Gian Baxter	Cuba	15.49	15.75	15.48	15.75	q
4	Thomas Martinez	France	14.78	15.71	15.69	15.71	q
5	Koki Kanai	Japan	15.06	15.12	15.69	15.69	q
6	Lâchezar Vâlchev	Bulgaria	15.63	x	x	15.63	q
7	Xu Heton	China	15.36	15.53	15.49	15.53	q
8	Chavez Penn	Jamaica	15.11	x	15.32	15.32	q
9	Steven Freund	Germany	14.88	x	15.09	15.09	
10	Sami Bakheet	Saudi Arabia	14.81	x	x	14.81	

==== Group B ====
Rank	Athlete	Nation	Round			Mark	Notes
Rank	Athlete	Nation	1	2	3	Mark	Notes
1	Sterling Scott	United States	15.22	15.79	16.29	16.29	Q, PB
2	Ma Yinglong	China	15.78	16.21		16.21	Q, SB
3	Anthony Martínez	Cuba	14.59	x	15.45	15.45	q
4	Alex Epitropakis	Australia	13.54	14.47	15.35	15.35	q
5	Santiago Theran	Colombia	15.30	15.20	15.05	15.30	
6	Giorgos Grepsios	Greece	14.94	x	15.21	15.21	
7	Jeong Tae-sik	South Korea	15.00	15.20	15.11	15.20	
8	Aleksis Gailītis	Latvia	14.90	15.04	14.72	15.04	
9	Gilvan da Costa	Brazil	14.37	13.53	15.01	15.01	
10	Ng Tak Sing	Malaysia	13.24	x	14.20	14.20	

=== Final ===
Rank	Athlete	Nation	Round						Mark	Notes
Rank	Athlete	Nation	1	2	3	4	5	6	Mark	Notes
1st place, gold medalist(s)	Ethan Olivier	New Zealand	16.76 (+1.4 m/s)	16.82 (+1.3 m/s)	16.64 (+1.9 m/s)	16.22 (+1.2 m/s)	17.01 (+1.4 m/s)	16.89 (+0.8 m/s)	17.01 m (+1.4 m/s)	AU20R
2nd place, silver medalist(s)	Karson Gordon	United States	16.18 (+0.1 m/s)	x	16.74 (+0.6 m/s)	x	—	—	16.74 m (+0.6 m/s)	PB
3rd place, bronze medalist(s)	Ma Yinglong	China	x	16.09 (+0.7 m/s)	x	16.30 (+0.4 m/s)	x	15.53 (+0.3 m/s)	16.30 m (+0.4 m/s)	PB
4	Lâchezar Vâlchev	Bulgaria	x	16.16 (+1.0 m/s)	15.77 (+1.7 m/s)	15.93 (+1.2 m/s)	x	15.83 (−0.5 m/s)	16.16 m (+1.0 m/s)	PB
5	Sterling Scott	United States	13.37 (+0.0 m/s)	x	15.72 (+0.4 m/s)	15.79 (+0.3 m/s)	15.88 (−0.5 m/s)	16.09 (+0.4 m/s)	16.09 m (+0.4 m/s)	
6	Gian Baxter	Cuba	15.61 (−0.7 m/s)	x	x	15.56 (+0.2 m/s)	x	15.68 (+0.6 m/s)	15.68 m (+0.6 m/s)	
7	Koki Kanai	Japan	15.60 (+1.8 m/s)	15.57 (+0.7 m/s)	15.19 (−0.2 m/s)	13.77 (+0.0 m/s)	—	15.44 (+1.2 m/s)	15.60 m (+1.8 m/s)	
8	Thomas Martinez	France	15.60 (+1.6 m/s)	x	15.50 (+0.4 m/s)	x	14.05 (+0.3 m/s)	15.34 (+1.5 m/s)	15.60 m (+1.6 m/s)	
9	Xu Heton	China	x	15.56 (+1.5 m/s)	x				15.56 m (+1.5 m/s)	
10	Anthony Martínez	Cuba	15.00 (+1.0 m/s)	13.83 (−0.3 m/s)	x				15.00 m (+1.0 m/s)	
11	Chavez Penn	Jamaica	14.71 (+1.5 m/s)	—	r				14.71 m (+1.5 m/s)	
–	Alex Epitropakis	Australia	x	r					NM	
