= Amy Bunnage =

Australian long-distance runner

Personal information
- Born: 2 March 2005 (age 21)

Sport
- Sport: Athletics
- Events: Long-distance running, Cross country running

Amy Bunnage (born 22 March 2005) is an Australian long-distance and cross country runner. She is the Oceania under-20 area record holder over 5000 metres.

== Career ==
Bunnage was selected for the U20 race at the 2023 World Cross Country Championships in Bathurst, New South Wales. In April 2023, Bunnage won the Australian under-20 titles over 3000 metres and 5000 metres, winning the 3000m in 9:00.33, while running the 5000m in 15:31.96.

Bunnage was selected for the U20 race at the 2024 World Cross Country Championships in Belgrade, but had to withdraw. She was later selected for the 2024 World Athletics U20 Championships in Lima, Peru.

Bunnage placed fourth overall at the 2024 NCAA Division I cross country championships running for Stanford University, in November 2024. She ran 15:00.75 for the 5000 metres indoors in Boston, Massachusetts in December 2024.

In January 2025, Bunnage completed the 3000m at the John Thomas Terrier Classic in 8:43.82 and placed third overall behind Nikki Hiltz and Linden Hall. The time broke the Australian national U20 indoor record and her own Australian under-20 record of 8:51.90 for the 3000 metres which she had previously set outdoors in 2023, and moved her to fifth on the all-time Australian senior 3000m short-track list. It was also the seventh-fastest time in collegiate indoor history, and broke Stanford's indoor 3000m record which had been held since the 1980s by PattiSue Plumer. Competing for the first time since March 2025, Bunnage placed fourth overall in the women's cross country at the NCAA West regional in Sacramento, California, to lead the Stanford Cardinals to the team title.

== Personal life ==
Bunnage is from Victoria before studying at Stanford University in the United States.
