= Gout Gout =

Australian sprinter (born 2007)

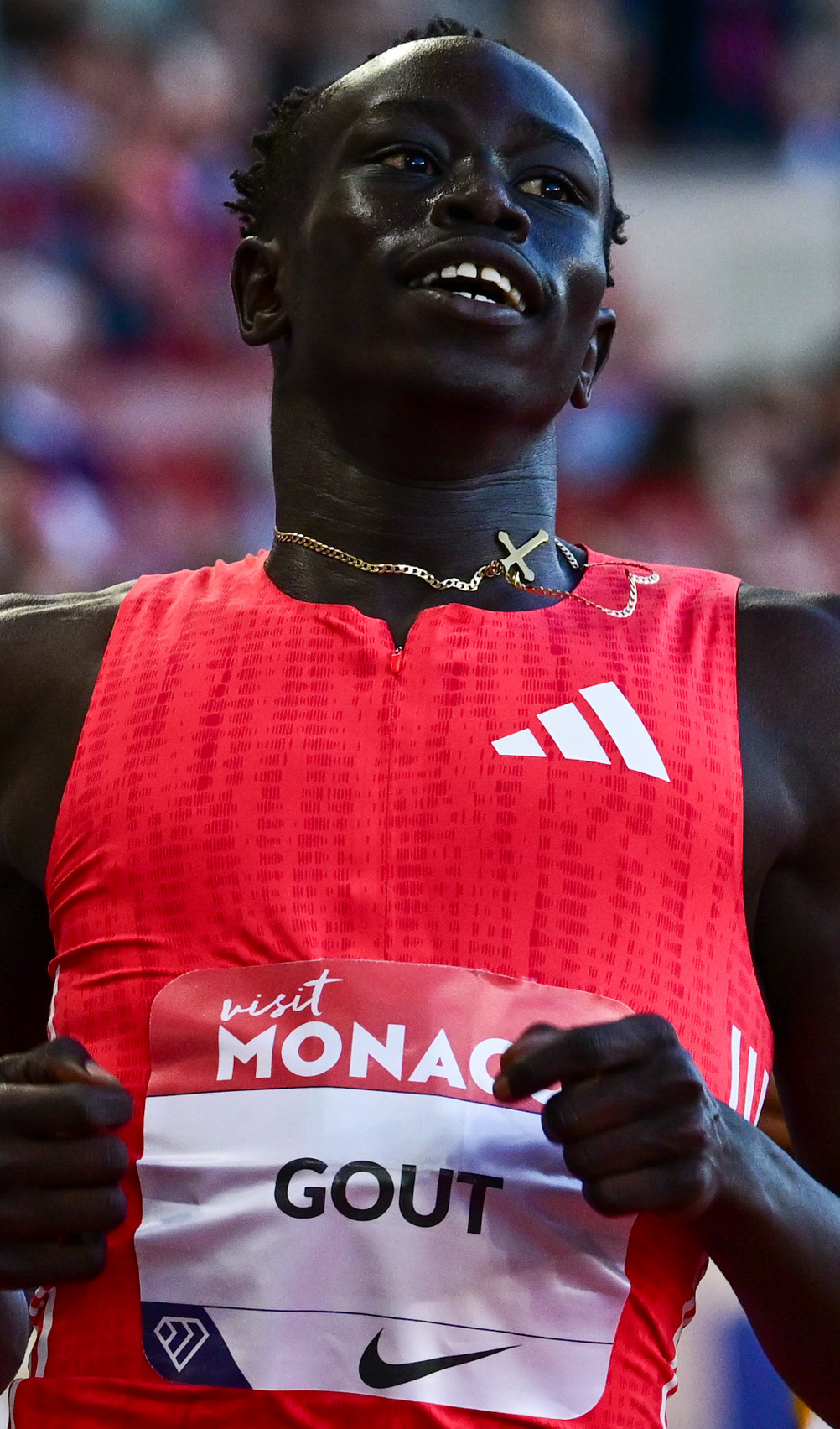
- Gout Gout at the 2025 Herculis Meeting in Monaco

Personal information
- Born: 29 December 2007 (age 18) Ipswich, Queensland, Australia
- Height: 1.83 m (6 ft 0 in)

Sport
- Country: Australia
- Sport: Athletics
- Events: 100 metres, 200 metres

Achievements and titles
- Personal bests: *All information from athlete's World Athletics profile unless otherwise noted.: 60 m: 6.98 (Gold Coast 2024); 100 m: 10.00 AU20R (Brisbane 2026); 200 m: 19.67 AR AU20R WU20R (Sydney 2026); 400 m: 46.14 (Brisbane 2025)
Medal record
Men's athletics
Representing Australia
World U20 Championships
| Silver medal – second place | 2024 Lima | 200 m |

Gout Gout (/ɡaʊt ɡaʊt/; born 29 December 2007) is an Australian sprinter. He is the Oceanian record and world under-20 record holder in the 200 metres, with a time of 19.67(+1.7 m/s) seconds set in 2026.

== Early life and background ==
Gout was born in Ipswich, Queensland, as one of seven children to Dinka parents from South Sudan, who moved to Australia two years before he was born. According to Gout's father Bona, when he and his wife Monica fled South Sudan for Egypt, before moving to Australia, the family name, which was originally pronounced /gwɔt/ (romanised as "Guot" or "Gwot"), was misspelled during transliteration from Arabic (غوت). "Gout", pronounced to rhyme with "pout", remains his official name. Gout's father has expressed a desire to change the name back to its original spelling to avoid connotation with the medical condition gout.

As of 2023, Gout attended Ipswich Grammar School in South East Queensland. In his younger years, he played soccer, before making the decision to focus on athletics.

== Career ==
The holder of the Australian under-16 100 and 200 m records, Gout ran 10.57 seconds for the 100 m as a 14-year-old in 2022. The following April, at the age of 15, Gout first broke the Australian under-18 men's 200 m record. He ran 20.87 seconds to win the under-18 men's 200 m final at the Australian Junior Athletics Championships in Brisbane in April 2023.

=== 2024 ===
Gout ran a personal best time of 10.29s to win the U18 Boys 100 m at the Queensland Athletics Championships in Brisbane, in March 2024. He won the Australian U20 100 m title in Adelaide in April 2024, running a time of 10.48 seconds. He represented Australia at the 2024 World Athletics U20 Championships in Lima, Peru, where he won the silver medal in the 200 metres in August 2024 in a personal best time of 20.60 (−0.7 m/s). On 18 October he competed in the 2024 GPS Track & Field Championships, winning the 200 and 400 m double with times of 20.86 seconds for the 200 m, and 47.57 seconds for the 400 m.

On 28 October, he signed his first contract with Adidas. At the Queensland All-Schools Championships in the first weekend of November, he clocked a time of 20.29 (+1.2 m/s) in the heats of the 200 m. In addition to achieving the Oceanian U20 record, he became the fourth fastest Australian over this distance and the fastest since 1993. This performance placed him fourth in the world all-time youth performance rankings, behind Usain Bolt and Puripol Boonson.

On 6 December, at the 2024 Australian All Schools Athletics Championship, he ran a personal best time of 10.04 (+3.4 m/s) in the 100 m to win his heat. This time was the fourth-fastest U18 time in the world and the fifth-fastest all-time 100 m run by an Australian. He backed this up by winning the final in 10.17 (+0.9 m/s), breaking the Australian U18 record, which had been held by Australia's reigning men's senior champion Sebastian Sultana. The next day, in the 200 m final, Gout ran 20.04 seconds. This time ranked as the second-fastest U18 performance of all time (behind only Erriyon Knighton) and made Gout only the second U18 athlete to surpass Usain Bolt's record in this category. Gout's time also broke the Australian and Oceanian record of 20.06, previously held by Peter Norman, who had set his record time while taking the silver medal in the 200 m Final at the 1968 Summer Olympic Games in Mexico City.

=== 2025 ===
He finished runner-up to compatriot Lachlan Kennedy in the 200 metres race at the Maurie Plant Meet in Melbourne on 29 March 2025. On 13 April 2025, he won the 200 metres race at the Australian Athletics Championships in a wind-assisted 19.84 seconds (+2.2 m/s) in Perth. He made his debut racing in Europe at the Golden Spike, Ostrava, Czech Republic, on 24 June 2025, where he lowered his own area record for the 200 metres set six months previously, by winning in 20.02 seconds (0.0 m/s) ahead of Reynier Mena of Cuba.

In September 2025, he was a semi-finalist in the 200 metres at the 2025 World Championships in Tokyo, Japan, finishing third in his heat in 20.23 seconds and fourth in 20.36 in his semi-final, without advancing to the final. The following month, he lowered his personal best for the 400 metres to 46.14 seconds whilst competing in Brisbane.

=== 2026 ===
In his first 100 metres race of 2026, Gout set a new Australian under-20 record of 10.00 seconds (+0.9) at the Dane Bird-Smith Shield Meet in Brisbane in February 2026, surpassing the previous record set by Jake Doran in 2018. It also equalled the fastest time ever recorded by an Australian on home soil. In April, he retained the Australian national 200 metres title with a new Australian 200 m record and world under-20 record time of 19.67 seconds (+1.7), finishing ahead of compatriot Aidan Murphy, who ran a personal best of 19.88 seconds, also inside the previous Oceanian record. The time placed him 16th on the world all-time list. On 10 June, he made his debut in the Diamond League, placing sixth over 200 metres at the 2026 Bislett Games in Oslo. His time in the race was 20.60 seconds. On 16 June, Gout placed third in 14.96 seconds over 150 metres at the Golden Spike meeting in Ostrava, as Noah Lyles set a new world record over the distance. Gout's time was 0.04 seconds outside the previous world record held by Kishane Thompson. The time constituted a world U20 record, as well as an outright Australian record. However, a hamstring injury prevented him from competing again that season, missing the World U20 Championships.

== Achievements ==
- Information from World Athletics profile unless otherwise noted.

=== Personal bests ===
| Distance | Time (s) | Wind | Location | Date | Notes |
|---|---|---|---|---|---|
| 60 metres | 6.98 | +1.5 m/s | Gold Coast, Australia | 12 July 2024 | |
| 100 metres | 10.00 | +0.9 m/s | Brisbane, Australia | 21 February 2026 | AU20R |
| 100 metres | 9.99 w | +3.5 m/s | Perth, Australia | 10 April 2025 | wind-assisted |
| 100 metres | 9.99 w | +2.6 m/s | Perth, Australia | 10 April 2025 | wind-assisted |
| 150 metres (bend) | 14.96 | +0.0 m/s | Ostrava, Czech Republic | 16 June 2026 | World under-20 best performance |
| 200 metres | 19.67 | +1.7 m/s | Sydney, Australia | 12 April 2026 | World under-20 record |
| 400 metres | 46.14 | —N/a | Brisbane, Australia | 24 October 2025 | |

=== International competitions ===
Representing Australia
| Year | Competition | Venue | Position | Event | Time | Notes |
|---|---|---|---|---|---|---|
| 2024 | Oceania U18 Athletics Championships | Suva, Fiji | 1st | 200 m | 21.24 | CR |
| 2024 | Oceania U18 Athletics Championships | Suva, Fiji | 1st | 4 × 100 m relay | 41.34 | |
| 2024 | World U20 Championships | Lima, Peru | 2nd | 200 m | 20.60 | PB |
| 2024 | World U20 Championships | Lima, Peru | 5th | 4 × 100 m relay | 39.64 | |
| 2025 | World Championships | Tokyo, Japan | 18th (sf) | 200 m | 20.36 | |

=== Circuit wins ===
- World Athletics Continental Tour
  - 2025 (200 m): 64th Ostrava Golden Spike

=== National championships ===
| Year | Competition | Venue | Position | Event | Time | Wind (m/s) | Notes |
|---|---|---|---|---|---|---|---|
| 2022 | Australian Athletics Championships U16 | Sydney | 6e | 100 m | 11.27 | −1.0 | |
| 2022 | Australian Athletics Championships U16 | Sydney | 4e | 200 m | 22.35 | +0.9 | |
| 2023 | Australian Athletics Championships U18 | Brisbane | 1st | 100 m | 10.50 | +1.3 | |
| 2023 | Australian Athletics Championships U18 | Brisbane | 1st | 200 m | 20.87 | −0.1 | AYR |
| 2024 | Australian Athletics Championships U18 | Adelaide | 1st | 100 m | 11.00 | -3.7 | |
| 2024 | Australian Athletics Championships U18 | Adelaide | 1st | 200 m | 21.23 | −2.2 | |
| 2024 | Australian Athletics Championships U20 | Adelaide | 1st | 100 m | 10.48 | +1.1 | |
| 2024 | Australian Athletics Championships U20 | Adelaide | 1st | 200 m | 20.97 | −1.0 | |
| 2025 | Australian Athletics Championships U20 | Perth | 1st | 100 m | 9.99 | +2.6 | Wind-assisted |
| 2025 | Australian Athletics Championships | Perth | 1st | 200 m | 19.84 | +2.2 | Wind-assisted |
| 2026 | Australian Athletics Championships | Sydney | 1st | 200 m | 19.67 | +1.7 | |
| 2026 | Australian Athletics Championships U20 | Brisbane | 1st | 100 m | 10.21 | +0.5 | |

Records
| Preceded by (United States) Erriyon Knighton | Men's World Under-20 Record Holder, 200 meters 12 April 2026 – present | Succeeded by Incumbent |
