= Simplot Games =

Coordinates: 42.870°N 112.429°W

Location in the United States
Location in Idaho

Simplot Games is an indoor track and field meet in the western United States, one of the nation's premier high school events. Held annually in February at ICCU Dome on the campus of Idaho State University in Pocatello, Idaho, it is sponsored by the J.R. Simplot Company.

More than 2,000 athletes from over twenty states, Australia, and Canada travel to the Simplot Games, held on the weekend of the third Saturday in February. First held 47 years ago in 1979, the indoor stadium's unique 200-meter banked-board track is one of the fastest in North America. Records have been broken regularly since the track debuted in the early 1970s.

At the Simplot Games, high school athletes get the chance to mingle with guest Olympic legends such as chair Dick Fosbury (until his death in 2023). The meet also offers recognition for all participants with the Parade of Athletes, an Olympic-style event. The Games are unique among national events as an open meet, which means athletes do not need a certain qualifying time, height, or distance; all high school age athletes are welcome, and admission is free.

== Meet Management ==
=== Chair of the Simplot Games ===
Dick Fosbury until his death in 2023

=== Executive committee ===
Kristi Borgholthaus – Executive Director
Greg Burch – Meet Director
Kevin Robbins – J.R. Simplot Co., retired
Trisha Arave – J.R. Simplot Co.
Andrea Gumm – J.R. Simplot Co.

== History ==
The Simplot Games began in 1979 as a small regional track meet and has since become one of the nation’s leading high school track and field events. The event maintains its traditions while incorporating new features each year.

=== Milestones ===
1979 – Simplot takes over financial sponsorship of the Bennion Games
1984 – High jumper Lisa Bernhagen of Hailey, Idaho, sets Games’ first National Record (the record still stands)
1985 – Simplot hires its first Meet Director and takes on entire responsibility
1985 – Computers are used for the first time to run the meet
1988 – Simplot Games celebrates 10th Anniversary with introduction of 1st Commemorative Pin
1994 – adidas joins Simplot Games as an official sponsor
1995 — Olympians Florence Griffith Joyner (FloJo) & Al Joyner make their first appearance at the Games
1997 – Games website (www.simplotgames.com) goes online
1998 – J. R. Simplot receives the first “Pacesetter” award from USA Track & Field (USATF)
1999 – First use of the “Big Screen” in Holt Arena to pay tribute to the memory of FloJo, who died in 1998
2000 & 2001 – USATF brings its professional meet to the Simplot Games. Stacy Dragila set a world record in the Pole Vault in 2000 and broke it (twice) in 2001
2003 – On-Line Registration begins
2008 – Simplot Games celebrates 30 Years; J.R. Simplot dies on May 25, 2008, at the age of 99
2009 – “Spirit of the Games Award” to honor J.R. Simplot is presented to Olympian Dick Fosbury, Honorary Chairman of the Simplot Games
2023 – Ryan Crouser sets a new shot put world record of 23.38 m.

== J.R. Simplot ==
Agribusiness magnate J. R. Simplot (1909–2008) was a supporter of the Simplot Games and regularly attended on Saturdays to view the ceremonies and final events. He enjoyed mingling with the high school participants, shaking hands, encouraging them to do well on the track and in school, and sharing one of his secrets to success: “Stay with it and just do your best.”

He recognized the similarity in finding success in business and on the track: hard work, vision, the willingness to take risks, and the ability to overcome the odds.

Simplot launched his empire in 1923 at age fourteen in Declo in Cassia County, and no doubt recognized the potential in each of the young athletes he greeted.

== Ceremonies and Parade of Athletes ==
The Ceremonies and Parade of Athletes has been an annual tradition of the Simplot Games. During this Olympic-style event, 2,000 athletes make their way around Idaho State University's historic wood track. Also during the Ceremonies and Parade of Athletes special guest are introduced, national anthems are played, and athletes from each state enjoy their moment in the spotlight.

== Meet Records ==
=== Boys ===
EVENT	RECORD	ATHLETE/TEAM	YEAR
60 Meter	6.68	Kenny O’Neal, Sacramento, CA	2004
60 Meter Hurdle	7.78	Michael Hancock, Denver, CO	2008
200 Meter	21.41	Faquawn Green, New Bern, NC	2010
400 Meter	45.92	Elzie Coleman, Newburgh, NY	2004
800 Meter	1:49.46	Joshua Hammond, Leduc, Alberta	2015
1600 Meter	4:10.22	Ricky Faure, Rock Spring, WY	2014
3200 Meter	9:00.62	Ben Saarel, SLC, UT	2013
4X200 Relay	1:27.60	Track Eastern Carolina, New Bern, NC	2009
4X400 Relay	3:14.84	John Muir R.C., Pasadena, CA	1996
4X800 Relay	7:47.88	Bingham Track Club, So. Jordan, UT	1998
Medley Relay	3:26.28	Track Eastern Carolina, New Bern, NC	2009
High Jump	7′ 2 ¼ “	Alfredo Deza, Lima, Peru	1998
Long Jump	24′ 8 ½”	Clarence Scott, Long Beach, CA	1996
Triple Jump	52′ 2 ¾”	Greg Yeldell, Spencer, NC	1998
Shot Put	77′ 2 ¾”	Ryan Crouser, Gresham, OR	1998
Pole Vault	17′ 6 1/4″	Pat Manson, Denver, CO	1986
Weight Throw	82′ 7 1/4″	Leif Arrhenius, Orem, UT	2004

=== Girls ===
EVENT	RECORD	ATHLETE/ TEAM	YEAR
60 Meter	7.19	Ashley Owens, Colorado Springs, CO	2004
60 Meter Hurdle	8.16	Jacquelyn Coward, Knoxville, TN	2008
200 Meter	22.97	Bianca Knight, Ridgeland, MS	2007
400 Meter	53.38	Lashinda Demus, Long Beach, CA	2001
800 Meter	2:07.00	Heidi Houle, Orem, UT	2005
1600 Meter	4:51.65	Alicia Craig, Gillette, Wy	2000
3200 Meter	10:32.41	Emily Kroshus, Calgary, Alb, CA	2000
4X200 Relay	1:36.55	Teekay Track Club, Long Beach, CA	1997
4X400 Relay	3:44.26	United Stars Track Club, Philadelphia, PA	2000
4X800 Relay	9:12.22	Bruin T.C., Orem, UT	2003
Medley Relay	3:56.40	Zodiacs T.C., New York City, NY	1996
High Jump	6′ 3″	Lisa Bernhagen, Hailey, ID	1984
Long Jump	20′ 5″	Brittany Daniels, Tracy, CA	2005
Triple Jump	43′ 5″	Brittany Daniels, Tracy, CA	2005
Shot Put	51′ 5 ¾”	Collinous Newsome, Denver, CO	1994
Pole Vault	13′ 1″	Shade Weygandt, Mansfield, TX	2008
Weight Throw	60′ 5″	Shelby Ashe, Marietta, GA	2010

=== Coaches ===
EVENT	RECORD	ATHLETE/TEAM	YEAR
200 M Men	22.04	CJ Crow, Denver, CO	2008
200 M Men 40+	23.48	Raphael August, Colorado Springs, CO	2002
200 M Women	24.84	Jackie Poulson, Pocatello, ID	2004
1600 M Men	4:09.02	Elvis Terry, Pocatello, ID	1999
1600 M Men 40+	4:26.87	Jay Woods, Lehi, UT	1998
1600 M W	4:53.94	Nicole Burke, Salt Lake City, UT	1992
1600 M W 40+	5:08.97	Becky Sondag, Casper, WY	2010

Legend: At the Time Set – @ National Record, #Age Group National Record

=== Media Coverage ===
Full event results, news updates, photos and more information can be found at www.simplotgames.com. News and highlights on Simplot Games are available on Twitter, Facebook, and YouTube. Additional Simplot Games news, results, statistics, and photos, as well as high school track and field news, are online at ESPN Rise DyeStat at .
