= 1991 IAAF World Indoor Championships – Men's 400 metres =

The men's 400 metres event at the 1991 IAAF World Indoor Championships was held on 8, 9 and 10 March.

== Medalists ==
Gold	Silver	Bronze
Devon Morris; Jamaica	Samson Kitur; Kenya	Cayetano Cornet; Spain

== Results ==
=== Heats ===
First 2 of each heat (Q) and next 4 fastest (q) qualified for the semifinals.

Rank	Heat	Name	Nationality	Time	Notes
1	1	Ian Morris	Trinidad and Tobago	47.03	Q
2	2	Samson Kitur	Kenya	47.04	Q
3	1	Cayetano Cornet	Spain	47.11	Q
3	2	Howard Burnett	Jamaica	47.11	Q
5	3	Charles Jenkins Jr.	United States	47.17	Q
6	2	Raymond Pierre	United States	47.18	q
7	4	Alvin Daniel	Trinidad and Tobago	47.19	Q
8	3	Devon Morris	Jamaica	47.28	Q
9	4	Antonio Sánchez	Spain	47.33	Q
10	4	Mark Garner	Australia	47.52	q
11	4	Abdelali Kasbane	Morocco	47.56	q, NR
12	1	Paul Greene	Australia	47.67	q
13	3	Amar Hecini	Algeria	47.95	
14	1	Christopher Nibilo	Tanzania	48.40	NR
15	1	Benyounés Lahlou	Morocco	48.94	
16	4	Roberto Bortolotto	Brazil	49.07	
17	2	Christian Boda	Mauritius	49.47	
18	3	Inaldo Justino Sena	Brazil	49.49	
19	2	Julio Caballero	Paraguay	50.95	NR
	2	Dmitriy Golovastov	Soviet Union	DNF	
	3	Desi Wynter	United States Virgin Islands	DQ	
	1	Ali Faudet	Chad	DNS	
	3	Morris Okinda	Tanzania	DNS	
	4	Ahmed Abdelhalim Ghanem	Egypt	DNS	

=== Semifinals ===
First 3 of each semifinal (Q) qualified directly for the final.

Rank	Heat	Name	Nationality	Time	Notes
1	1	Devon Morris	Jamaica	46.30	Q
2	2	Samson Kitur	Kenya	46.43	Q, NR
3	1	Charles Jenkins Jr.	United States	46.55	Q
4	2	Howard Burnett	Jamaica	46.62	Q
5	1	Cayetano Cornet	Spain	46.69	Q
6	2	Alvin Daniel	Trinidad and Tobago	47.03	Q
7	1	Abdelali Kasbane	Morocco	47.05	NR
8	1	Mark Garner	Australia	47.06	
9	2	Paul Greene	Australia	47.20	
10	2	Raymond Pierre	United States	47.51	
11	2	Antonio Sánchez	Spain	47.59	
	1	Ian Morris	Trinidad and Tobago	DNF	

=== Final ===
Rank	Name	Nationality	Time	Notes
1st place, gold medalist(s)	Devon Morris	Jamaica	46.17	PB
2nd place, silver medalist(s)	Samson Kitur	Kenya	46.21	NR
3rd place, bronze medalist(s)	Cayetano Cornet	Spain	46.52	
4	Charles Jenkins Jr.	United States	47.18	
5	Howard Burnett	Jamaica	47.84	
6	Alvin Daniel	Trinidad and Tobago	1:32.39	
