= Ethan Olivier =

New Zealand athlete (born 2005)

Personal information
- Born: 7 August 2005 (age 21) Auckland, New Zealand
- Relative: Welrè Olivier (brother)

Sport
- Country: New Zealand
- Sport: Athletics
- Event: Triple jump

Achievements and titles
- National finals: Triple jump champion (2024, 2025)
- Personal bests: Triple jump: 17.01m (2024) NR
Medal record
Men's athletics
Representing New Zealand
World U20 Championships
Gold medal – first place	2024 Lima	Triple jump

Ethan Olivier (born 7 August 2005) is a track and field athlete. He is the New Zealand record holder in the triple jump and world under-20 champion in 2024. He represented New Zealand at the 2024 Olympic Games.

== Early life and education ==
Born in Auckland to South African parents, he moved to Vereeniging, South Africa as a child. He and his older brother Welrè, also a triple jumper, hold dual New Zealand and South African.

Olivier attended High School Overvaal. He is coached by his father Wikus, a former South African national champion in the triple jump. He studies at North-West University.

== Career ==
He declared for New Zealand in 2021. In 2022, he finished fourth in the men’s triple jump at the 2022 World Athletics U20 Championships in Cali, Colombia.

In February 2023, he set U20/U19 and U18 New Zealand national records with a jump of 16.22m in Potchefstroom, South Africa. In June 2023, he broke the NZ triple jump record of his elder brother, Welre, with a 16.67m leap in Brussels.

In February 2024, in his first ever competition in New Zealand, he won the International Track Meet in Christchurch with a wind assisted 16.85 metres. He jumped 16.62m to win the New Zealand national senior title in Wellington in 2024.

He competed in the triple jump at the 2024 Paris Olympics. On 29 August 2024, he won the gold medal in the triple jump at the 2024 World Athletics U20 Championships in Lima, Peru with a jump of 17.01 metres.

He finished in fifth place in the triple jump at the 2025 Xiamen Diamond League event in China, in April 2025. The following week, he finished sixth at the 2025 Shanghai Diamond League event in China on 3 May 2025. He finished sixth with a jump of 16.70 metres at the 2025 Bislett Games in Oslo on 12 June 2025.

In September 2025, he competed at the 2025 World Championships in Tokyo, Japan.

In July 2026, he placed fourth in the triple jump at the 2026 Commonwealth Games in Glasgow, Scotland.
