= Cameron Myers =

Australian athlete (born 2006)

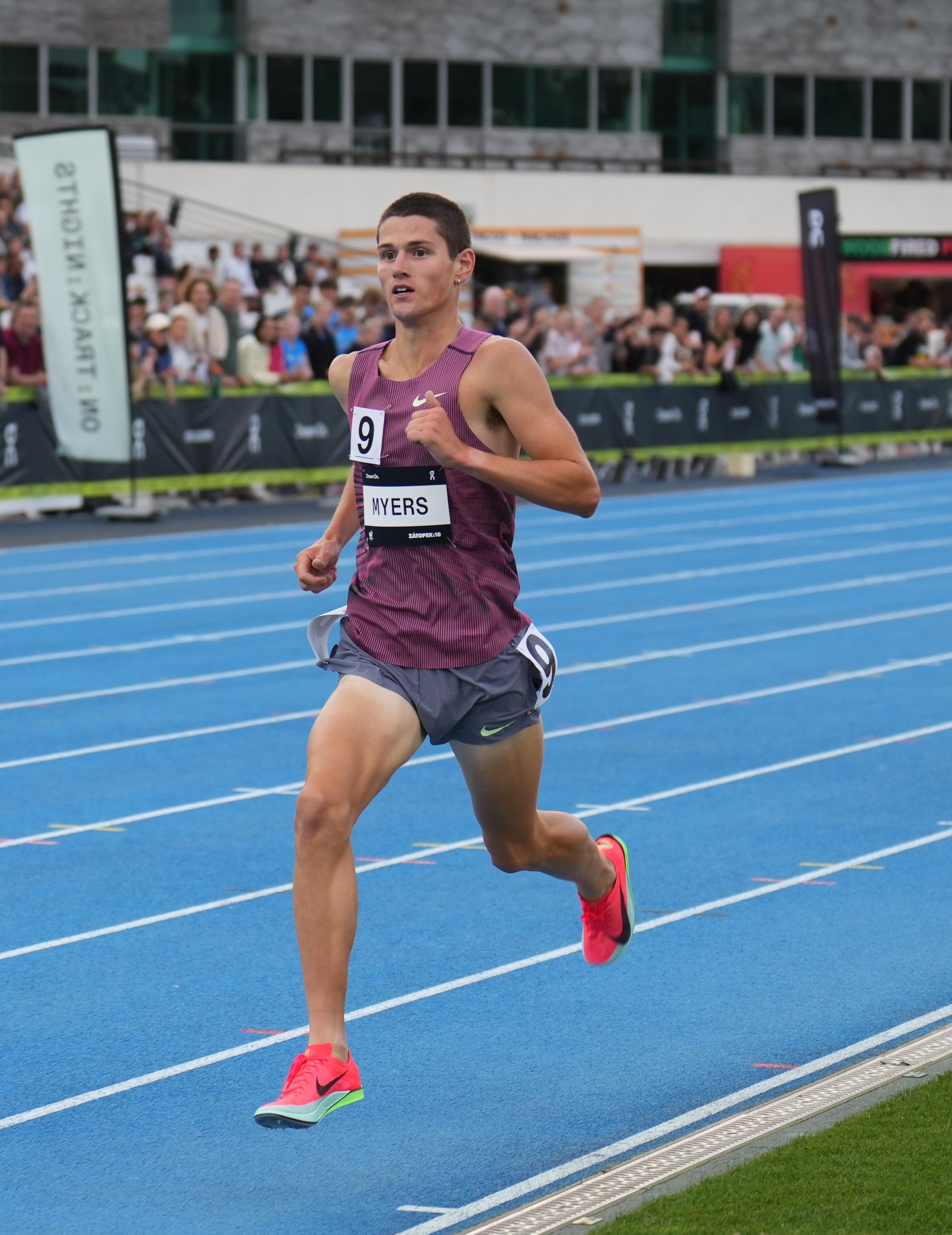
- Myers leading the open 3000 metres at the 2024 Zatopec Meeting in Melbourne

Personal information
- Nationality: Australian
- Born: 9 June 2006 (age 20)

Sport
- Sport: Athletics
- Events: Mile, 800 m, 1000 m, 1500 m, 3000 m, 5000 m

Achievements and titles
- Personal bests: All information from athlete's World Athletics profile.: Outdoor; 800 m: 1:44.05 (Karlsruhe 2026); 1000 m: 2:17.25 AU20R (Paris 2025); 1500 m: 3:28.00 AR (Paris 2026); Mile: 3:46.06 AR (Eugene 2026); 3000 m: 7:27.97 AR (Zurich 2026); Indoor; 1500 m: 3:32.67+i AU20R (New York 2025); Mile: 3:47.48i WU20R AR NR (New York 2025); 3000 m: 7:27.57i AU20R NR (Boston 2026)
Medal record
Men's athletics
Representing Australia
World Ultimate Championship
Second place	2026 Budapest	1500 m
Diamond League
Gold medal – first place	2026 Brussels	1500 m
Commonwealth Games
Silver medal – second place	2026 Glasgow	Mile
World U20 Championships
Silver medal – second place	2024 Lima	1500 m

Cameron Myers (born 9 June 2006) is an Australian track and field athlete. In 2023, he broke the world record for the fastest mile by a sixteen year-old, and became the second youngest person in the world to ever have run a sub-four minute mile. At the age of sixteen, he took the Australian national under-20 mile record. Myers broke Jakob Ingebrigtsen's mile, 1500 m and 3000 m age-group records. In January 2025, he set a new world under-20 indoor record in the mile, and in 2026 set a new Oceanian record in the 1500 metres and won the silver medal in the mile run at the 2026 Commonwealth Games and placed second over 1500 metres at the inaugural World Ultimate Championship.

== Early life ==
From Canberra, Myers graduated from Lake Ginnindera College in 2024.

From aged 10 he trained with Lee Bobbin. At age 14, Bobbin started training Myers with Dick Telford and his elite group including Olympic 1500-metre runner Jye Edwards. He also runs for the Bankstown Track Club in Sydney.

== Career ==
=== 2022 ===
Myers won the Albie Thomas 1 Mile Australian Championship on 5 December 2022, at The Crest in Sydney.

=== 2023 ===
Myers broke Ryan Gregson's Australian under-18 record for the 1500 metres by more than three seconds when he ran 3:40.6 on 23 January 2023.

In February 2023, Myers became the second youngest person in history to break the four-minute mile. Myers ran 3:55.44 seconds at Albert Park in Melbourne at the Maurie Plant Meet aged 16 years and 259 days. Myers was nine days older than Jakob Ingebrigtsen when he ran 3:58.07 in May 2017, but was more than two seconds faster. Speaking about breaking the world record for a 16-year-old Myers said: "I don't think it changes much for me. It is about how you progress to the open ranks. It's only an age world record. It's cool to have, but it's not the be-all and end-all." The time also broke the Australian u-20 record.

In July 2023, Myers clocked a 1500 m time of 3:33.26 at the Diamond League event in Silesia. It was the fastest 1500 m run by an U18 athlete ever, breaking the 3:33.72 set by Nicholas Kiptanui Kemboi of Kenya in 2006. In September 2023, he acted as pacemaker for Jakob Ingebrigtsen's European record in the mile (3:43.73) at the Diamond League final in Eugene, Oregon.

=== 2024 ===
In February 2024, Myers won the men's 1500 m at the Adelaide Invitational with a time of 3:34:55. This was a new meeting record, two seconds ahead of the previous record set by Pat Scammell in 1988. On 15 February 2024, he lowered his personal best at the John Landy Mile at Melbourne's Maurie Plant Meet to 3:52.44. On 22 February, at Bankstown's the Crest athletic track, Myers set a new record for an Australian running in Australia of 3:33.30 (beating the previous record set by Jye Edwards on 18 April 2021 at the Australian National Athletics Championships at the Sydney Olympic Park).

In March 2024, he ran a new personal best and Australian U20 record time of 7:46.38 to win the Australian 3,000 metres national title in Sydney. Myers surpassed this mark at the Zatopek 10 meeting at Lakeside Stadium, Melbourne, on 14 December, where he ran 7:41.11.

In May 2024, in the Bowerman Mile at the Prefontaine Classic, Myers set a new personal best of 3:50.15.

He qualified fastest for the final of the 1500 metres at the 2024 World Athletics U20 Championships in Lima, Peru and in the final won the silver medal behind Abdisa Fayisa of Ethiopia.

=== 2025 ===
On 25 January, the Dr. Sander Invitational in New York, Myers took almost two seconds off the world indoor under-20 mile record, running 3:53.12 at the Dr Sander Invitational. The time improved the 3:55.02 previous record set by German Fernandez in 2009.

On 2 February 2025, he set a national record of 7:33.12 over 3000 metres at the New Balance Indoor Grand Prix.

On 8 February 2025, Myers broke his world indoor under-20 mile record by over 5 seconds, running 3:47.48 in the Wanamaker Mile at the Millrose Games in New York City. His time makes him the fifth fastest indoor mile runner in history, and is an Oceanian area record: both indoor and outdoor, equalling Ollie Hoare's outdoor record. En route, Myers set a new 1500 m personal best of 3:32.67, which stands as the fastest under-20 indoor 1500 m of all time.

He ran from the front to set a time of 3:34.98 to win the 1500 metres race at the Maurie Plant Meet in Melbourne on 29 March 2025. He won the Australian Athletics Championships 1500 metres title in Perth on 12 April 2025. The following day, he finished runner-up to Seth O'Donnell in the 5000 metres race at the championships. He was runner-up in the Dream Mile in 3:48.87 at the 2025 Bislett Games, part of the 2025 Diamond League, on 12 June 2025. He ran an Oceania under-20 record of 3:29.80 for the 1500 metres at the Golden Spike Ostrava on 24 June 2025. In September 2025, he competed at the 2025 World Championships in Tokyo, Japan, without advancing to the semi-finals.

On 28 November, Myers won the Australian World Cross Country Championships Selection Trials over 10 km in 29:43 ahead of Seth O'Donnell.

=== 2026 ===
On 17 January, Myers ran the fastest mile ever recorded in the month of January with 3:49.81 at the Washington Preview in Seattle. On 24 January 2026, Myers ran the 3000 metres indoors in 7:27.57, to move to tenth on the world indoor all-time list, and set an Oceanian record, indoors or outdoors, as well as a setting a new meeting record at the Indoor Grand Prix, in Boston. In doing so, Myers became the fourth man to have broken 7:28 before the age of 20 years-old, indoors or out, after Eliud Kipchoge, Jacob Kiplimo and Jakob Ingebrigtsen. On February 1, 2026, Myers won the Wanamaker Mile in a time of 3:47.57.

Competing at the 2026 Maurie Plant Meet in Melbourne he won the 1500 metres in a meet-record time of 3:30.42. It was the fastest time recorded on Australian soil, taking the all-comers record from Hicham El Guerrouj. He lowered that record to 3:29.85 in winning the Australian Championships on 10 April in Sydney. The following day, he also won the Australian national title over 5000 metres, running a personal best time of 13:11.66 ahead of defending champion Seth O'Donnell. In May, Myers ran a personal best 1:44.05 for the 800 metres at the Puma Nitro Lange Laufnacht in Karlsruhe, Germany, his first 800 m race since 2024. On 7 June, he placed second in 3:30.32 in the 1500 metres at the 2026 Bauhausgalan in Stockholm, part of the 2026 Diamond League, and later that week placed third in 3:48.35 in the mile in the Diamond League in Oslo. On 28 June, he set a new Oceanian record with 3:28.00 for the 1500 metres, winning at the 2026 Meeting de Paris. On 4 July, Myers ran a new Oceania record to win the Bowerman Mile at the 2026 Prefontaine Classic in 3:46.06. On 1 August, he was runner-up to the new world record holder for the mile, Josh Kerr, in the mile run at the 2026 Commonwealth Games in Glasgow, Scotland. On 27 August, he placed third with 7:27.97 for the 3000 metres at the 2026 Weltklasse Zürich. At the 2026 Diamond League Final in Brussels on 4 September, Myers won the 1500 metres title by four hundredths of a second ahead of Phanuel Koech of Kenya. On 13 September, Myers placed second behind Josh Kerr in the 1500 metres at the inaugural World Ultimate Championship in Budapest.

== Personal life ==
A keen football fan, he played as a youngster as a striker for Canberra Croatia and Gungahlin United. He supports Premier League club Chelsea.
