= Jessica Milat =

Australian athlete

Personal information
- Born: 1 January 2005 (age 21)

Sport
- Sport: Athletics
- Event: Sprint

Achievements and titles
- Personal best(s): 100m: 11:37 (2024); 200m: 22.75 (2025)
Medal record
Women's athletics
Representing AUS
Summer World University Games
| Gold medal – first place | 2025 Bochum | 4x100m relay |
World U20 Championships
| Bronze medal – third place | 2024 Lima | 200 m |

Jessica Milat (born 1 January 2005) is an Australian sprinter. She became Australian national champion over 200 metres in 2025.

== Career ==
In 2023, she lowered her personal bests to 11.54s and 23.26s at the Australian U20 nationals championships, winning a silver in the 100m and gold in the 200m.

She was part of the 4 × 100 m relay team which set an Australian Under 20 record alongside Chelsea Scolyer, Olivia Dodds and Zara Hagan at the Sydney Classic in 2024. Later that year, she was named in the Australian team for the 2024 World Athletics U20 Championships in Lima, Peru. She won her semi-final in 23.42 seconds to qualify for the final. In the final, she ran a personal best time of 23.21 seconds to finish in fourth place and was later promoted to the bronze medal after the race winner failed a drug test. She also anchored the Australian 4 × 100 m relay team to a second place finish at the Championships but they were later disqualified for an illegal baton exchange earlier in the race.

She was runner-up at the Perth Classic over 200 metres in a wind-legal 22.97 seconds on 1 March 2025. She ran a personal best 22.75 seconds to win the Australian Athletics Championships 200 metres race on 13 April 2025. She was selected for the 2025 Summer World University Games in Germany, winning the gold medal in the 100 metres and the 4 x 100 metres relay alongside Kristie Edwards, Olivia Inkster, and Georgia Harris.

== Personal life ==
She is from the state of Victoria.
