= Fort Washington Avenue Armory =

Armory in Manhattan, New York

- The Armory (Fort Washington Avenue Armory)
- U.S. National Register of Historic Places
- New York State Register of Historic Places
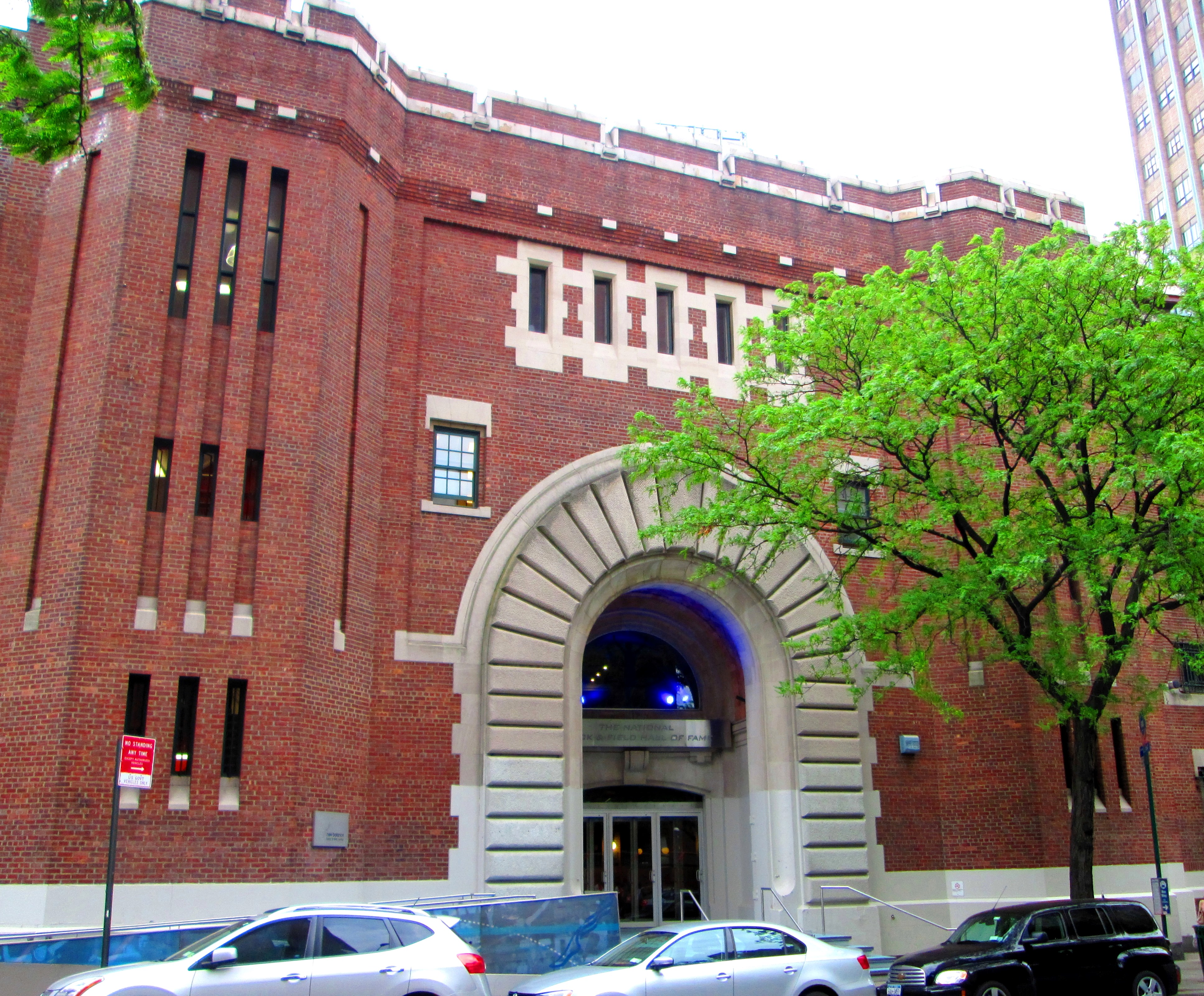
- entrance (2014)
- Location: 216 Fort Washington Avenue between West 168th & 169th Streets; Washington Heights; Manhattan, New York City
- Coordinates: 40°50′31.68″N 73°56′28.82″W
- Area: 1.9 acres (7,700 m^{2})
- Built: 1911
- Architect: Walker & Morris
- Architectural style: Classical Revival with Romanesque elements
- MPS: Army National Guard Armories in New York State
- NRHP reference No.: 95000085
- NYSRHP No.: 06101.007212

Significant dates
- Added to NRHP: 1995
- Designated NYSRHP: December 13, 1994

The Fort Washington Avenue Armory, also known as the Fort Washington Armory, The Armory, and the 22nd Regiment Armory, is a historic 5,000-seat arena and armory building located at 216 Fort Washington Avenue, between West 168th and 169th Streets, in the Washington Heights neighborhood of Manhattan, New York City. It is a brick Classical Revival building with Romanesque Revival elements, such as the entrance arch, and is currently home to the non-profit Armory Foundation, National Track and Field Hall of Fame, Nike Track and Field Center, and other organizations including the Police Athletic League of New York City.

When built in the early 20th century it was one of the first armories in New York City in the Neoclassical style, instead of the Gothic Revival mode favored during the 19th century. It was home to the 22nd Regiment of the Army Corps of Engineers, was used to give licensing exams for those who wished to become architects, engineers, nurses and so on, and was later used as a homeless shelter. Thanks to help of Dr. Norbert Sander The Armory was restored and in 1995 it was listed on the National Register of Historic Places. Today the building is home to "The Fastest Track in the World" as more records have been set on The Armory's track than any other facility in the world. The Armory is host to 100+ track meets annually and is one of only four World Athletics Certified Indoor Facilities in the United States.

== Building ==
Three stories high, the Armory is constructed of brick on a raised foundation with limestone and terra cotta trim. The administration building is on a fully exposed basement; the drill shed only partially. Iron bars protect the windows on the basement and first floor. The roofline is marked by a corbeled cornice and parapet with terra cotta trim.

The west (front) facade features a three-part projecting entrance pavilion flanked by four-bay sides. At the corners are square bastions with crenelated parapets in terra cotta. The entrance pavilion has octagonal bastions flanking smooth rusticated limestone voussoirs around a large sally port.

Both side elevations have nine asymmetrical bays, with round-arched windows in the second and third stories and double-hung casement windows at street level. Some on both sets have been filled in.

Behind a wooden portcullis at the rear of the sally port is the entrance, three wooden doors inside a segmentally arched stone architrave capped with a console-style keystone. It is inscribed with the words 22ND REGIMENT CORPS OF ENGINEERS NGNY. Above it is a multi-pane transom.

The interior retains much of its original finish. Rooms have terrazzo floors, glazed brick walls trimmed in terracotta. The cross-vaulted ceilings are sheathed in tiles laid in chevron patterns and have glazed terra cotta architraves at their entrances. There are bronze sconces throughout the building. A double-width staircase in fireproof steel and concrete has a curving rail. Its hallway is encircled with a wide frieze on which there are two remaining Works Progress Administration (WPA) murals.

At the north and south ends of the administration building are two large company meeting rooms. The south one features a paneled dado, beamed ceilings, hardwood floors and an intricately carved mantel flanked by two Doric columns. The north meeting room features paneled mahogany wainscoting, built-in trophy cases and a glazed brick fireplace with wooden overmantel.

The drill shed is a large barrel vaulted space with balcony on all sides allowing seating for 2,300. It has massive arched trusses and is lit and ventilated via a clerestory.

== History ==
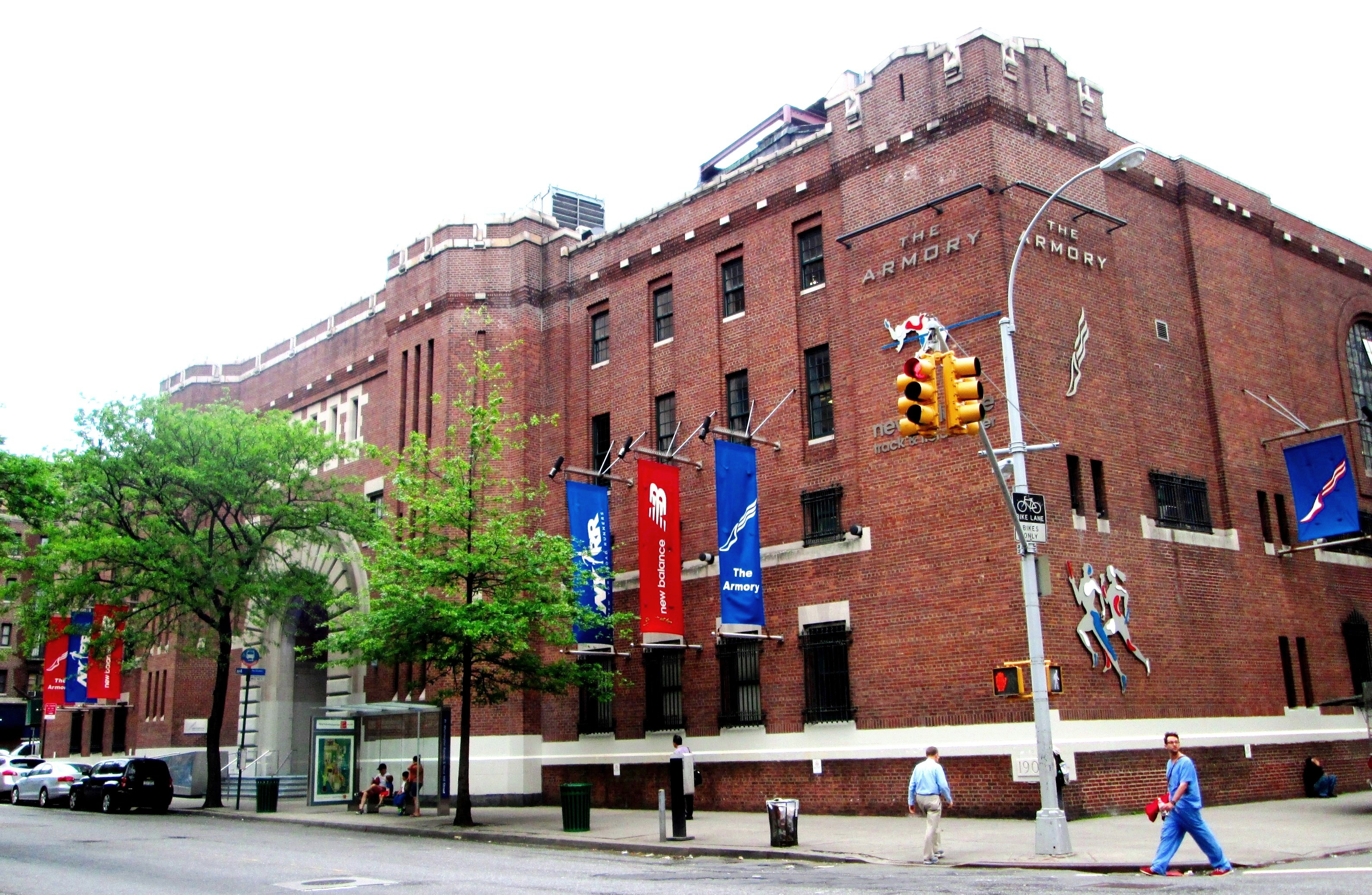
The west facade of the building (2014)

The 22nd Regiment traces its origins to the Union Grays, who stayed behind in Manhattan when the city's other units left for the Civil War. They helped suppress the New York City draft riots in 1863 and later saw some action on the front lines. They were one of the first units to have their own armory devoted solely to military purposes. It was located originally on West 14th Street near Sixth Avenue.

In 1890, the regiment moved to another armory on Broadway at Columbus Street on the Upper West Side. It was designed by one of the unit's members, Capt. John Leo. In 1907 the city's Armory Board held a competition for another new armory for the 22nd, to be located in the growing Washington Heights section of the city. The firm of Richard Walker and Charles Morris, whose works also included the South Ferry Building and several branch libraries in Brooklyn, won. The building was completed four years later, in 1911, at a cost of $1.16 million ($40.1 million in contemporary dollars).

Example photo from Hilltop Park showing the Armory, about 1911

The Armory building is visible behind left field and across 168th Street in later photos of Hilltop Park, the original home of the New York Yankees.

Sometime after World War II the 22nd was merged into the 42nd Division as the 102nd Engineering Battalion. It was moved around and downsized within the city's National Guard units several times until it was disbanded sometime in the late 20th century. Only two of the units survive; both are now attached to the 369th Regiment and based at its armory in Harlem.

The armory remained under the jurisdiction of the New York State Division of Military & Naval Affairs. From 1968-1978, the New York Rifle, Pistol and Shotgun Club was located at the Armory where it featured a multi-lane, 100 yard indoor shooting range, run by Barry Satz who lived a few blocks away. He was famous for walking the streets of New York City, carrying a virtual montage of weapons to be used at the range. The club met every Tuesday night and members brought myriad types of small arms from around the city to shoot at the range's targets. One problem with that shooting facility was to change the 100 yard targets, you had to practically crawl due to lack of a walkway to the extended long range target area. The range was lined with asbestos in the shooting lanes, which at that time, no one at the range knew to be a problem. It was used as a homeless shelter late in the 20th century, housing more than 1,000 people on the drill floor. A plan was developed to modify and expand it for that purpose that would have compromised its historical integrity, the plans for a larger shelter gave way in the mid-1980s, when the Armory became New York's premiere indoor track and field facility. At 96,000 square feet (8,900 m^{2}), it was almost double the size of Madison Square Garden. Through the Fort Washington Men's Shelter, the Armory provides shelter and services for 200 indigent adult males under the jurisdiction of the NYC Department of Homeless Services.

In 1992, a campaign began to refurbish and modernize The Armory into a state-of-the-art facility. Norbert Sander, who spearheaded the campaign, was the only New Yorker to have won the New York City Marathon, and a longtime member of the board of New York Road Runners. He raised $25 million and convinced elected officials, governmental agencies and corporate sponsors to allow him to take over the Armory. As part of the renovation, a banked track was installed. In 2002, the armory was chosen as the permanent home of the National Track and Field Hall of Fame, and it is now the largest site of indoor college and high school invitationals in the world. Since 2012, it has been the location for the New York Road Runners Millrose Games.

== Track & Field Center ==
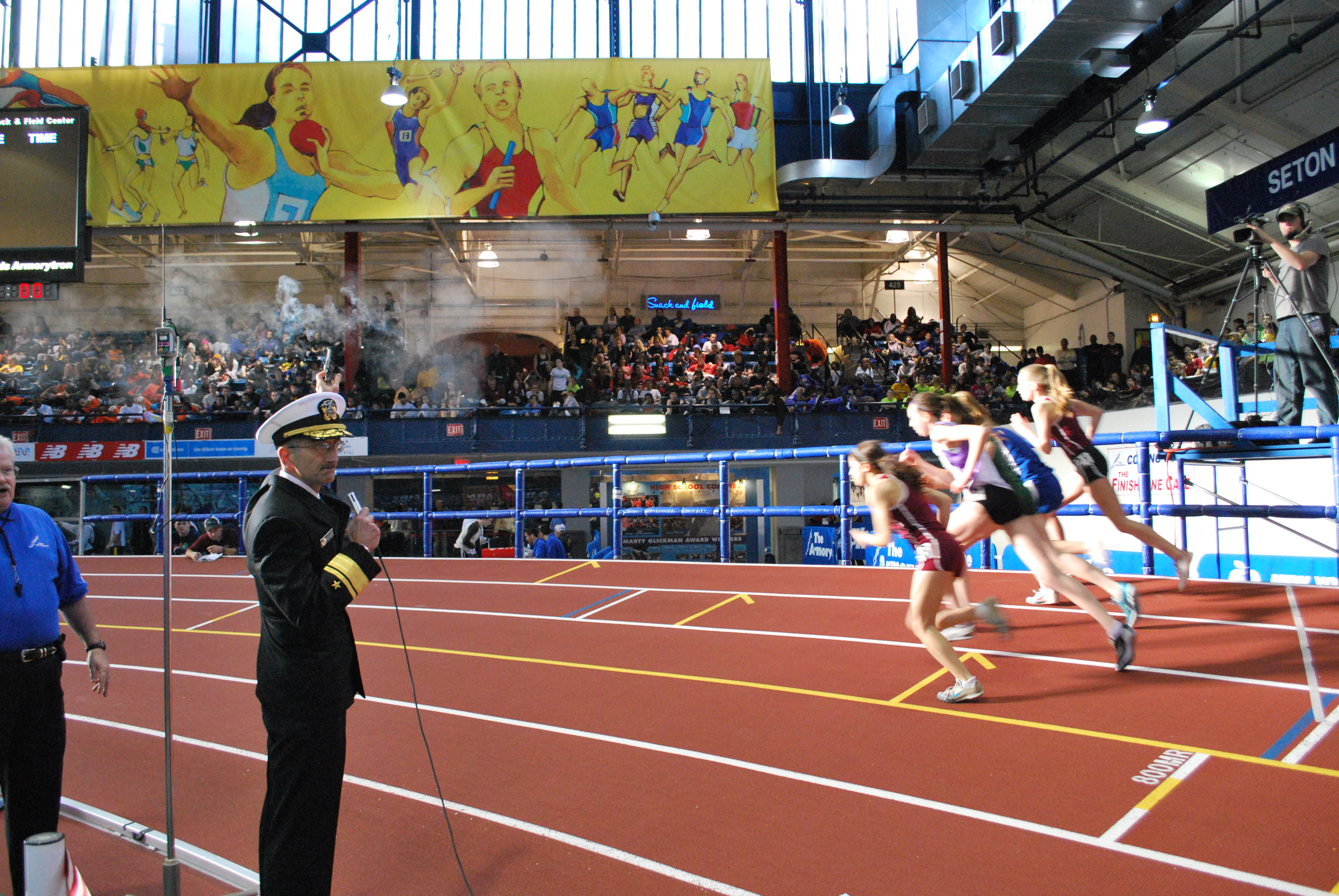
A race inside the Armory in 2010

The spacious third floor is home to the Nike Track and Field Center, a 200-meter, six-lane banked mondo track, two large runways and sand pits, a pole vault pit, and a throws cage. In September 2024, the track was revamped, with the removal of five older layers of track material, and the changing of the surface color from red to blue. The Center is widely regarded as one of the premier indoor track and field facilities in the United States and is one of only five World Athletics certified indoor facilities in the United States. The Center plays host to a number of meets at the high school, college, and professional/open/masters level each year, including the Millrose Games, Nike Indoor Nationals, The Dr. Sander Invitational/Columbia Challenge and several of the largest high school meets in the country. The Armory is also home to the Colgate Women's Games Championship, which is the largest track & field series for women in the nation. The Public School Athletic League (PSAL), the largest high school athletic league in the country, also makes their home at The Armory. A number of college programs – such as Columbia University, New York University, Saint John's University, St. Francis College, City College of New York and Iona College – utilize it as their home indoor track.

First held in 1908, the Millrose Games is the centerpiece of The Armory’s track and field calendar, and is arguably the most prestigious indoor meet in the world. The event formerly took place at Madison Square Garden before moving to The Armory in 2012. Millrose features elite competition at every level, with youth, high school, collegiate, professional, and masters races. Millrose traditionally concludes with the Wanamaker Mile, which has featured many icons of the sport, including Eamonn Coghlan and Bernard Lagat. At the 2020 event, Donavan Brazier, Ajeé Wilson, and Elinor Purrier each set new American records. In 2025, Yared Nuguse set a new world record in the indoor mile, running 3:46.63.

== The Armory Foundation ==
The Armory Foundation is a non-profit organization dedicated to serving youth by promoting fitness and education through a broad range of athletic, educational, and community programs and strives to "Keep Kids on Track."

Part of the foundation is The Armory College Prep (ACP) that helps in “Keeping Kids on Track.” Only 72 percent of New York City high school students go on to attend college after graduation, a number that is significantly lower in the underserved, largely black and Latino communities that ACP draws from. Since 2016, 100 percent of the program's graduating seniors have been admitted into four-year colleges. Students from Armory College Prep have gone on to attend Cornell, Amherst, Haverford, Williams, Washington & Lee, and many other competitive institutions.

Unlike other programs that only accept students with top grades or test scores, ACP is unscreened. All students who sign up are accepted into the program, and the full-time staff works around the clock to fill in the educational gaps. Students are given an assessment at the start of the program that helps identify strengths and weaknesses. The tutors take this data and create lesson plans for each student to help them achieve their potential.

ACP works to close the opportunity gap for the students by providing one-on-one tutoring in a variety of subjects, focusing on Math and English. It provides test prep for the SAT and other standardized tests, along with personalized college counseling that helps each student create a list of target schools and develop a personal narrative that is compelling to admissions officers. Through theater and literature programs, ACP also encourages students to find their own voice in the creative arts. Several years ago, ACP added a middle school program, which helps prepare younger students for the rigors of high school, along with providing curriculum depth in areas such as computer science and math.

== See also ==
- List of armories and arsenals in New York City and surrounding counties
- National Register of Historic Places listings in Manhattan above 110th Street
