= Haiti at the 1924 Summer Olympics =

Haiti at the Games of the XIII Olympiad in Paris

- IOC code: HAI
- NOC: Comité Olympique Haïtien

in Paris, France May 4, 1924 – July 27, 1924
- Competitors: 8 in 2 sports
- Officials: 2
- Medals Ranked 23rd: Gold 0 Silver 0 Bronze 1 Total 1

Summer Olympics appearances (overview)
- 1900; 1904–1920; 1924; 1928; 1932; 1936; 1948–1956; 1960; 1964–1968; 1972; 1976; 1980; 1984; 1988; 1992; 1996; 2000; 2004; 2008; 2012; 2016; 2020; 2024

Haiti competed at the 1924 Summer Olympics in Paris, France. These Games were held from 4 May to 27 July 1924. The country's participation in Paris marked its second appearance at the Summer Olympics since its debut in 1900.

The delegation was composed of ten people, with eight competitors, three in athletics and five in shooting, and two officials: athletics delegate V. Pasquet and secretary-general of the Comité Olympique Haïtien, Henec Dorsinville. Three other athletes: Louis Déjoie in athletics, and L. H. Clermont and C. Dupre in shooting, were planned to join the rest of the athletes but did not start in their competitions. The team was determined through different national competitions, with the athletics team being funded by the government of Haiti and their own money, while the shooting team was funded by a percentage of the nation's gendarmes' salaries.

The shooting team composed of Ludovic Augustin, Ludovic Valborge, Destin Destine, Astrel Rolland, and Eloi Metullus, led by Douglas C. McDougal of the United States, won the bronze medal in the men's team free rifle event. Their win earned the nation's first medal at any of the Olympic Games.

== Medalists ==
Medal	Name	Sport	Event	Date
Bronze	Ludovic Augustin, Eloi Metullus, Destin Destine, Astrel Rolland, Ludovic Valborge	Shooting	Men's team free rifle	June 27

== Background ==
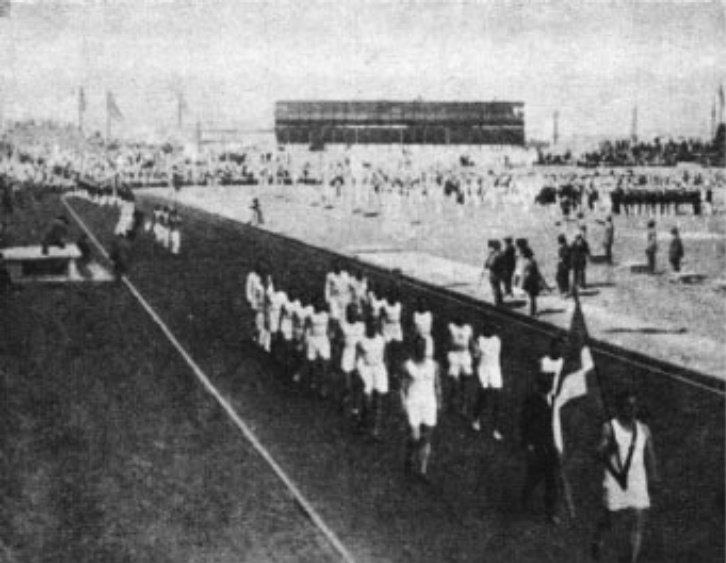
The Haitian delegation (back) after the Greek delegation (front) at the opening ceremony

The Games were held from 4 May to 27 July 1924, in the city of Paris, France. This edition of the Games marked the nation's second appearance at the Summer Olympics since its debut at the 1900 Summer Olympics, also in Paris. The Haitian delegation marched 20th out of 44 nations in the Parade of Nations within the opening ceremony.

Officials present were athletics delegate V. Pasquet and secretary-general of the Haitian Olympic Committee, Henec Dorsinville. Three other athletes: Louis Déjoie in the men's pole vault and decathlon, and L. H. Clermont and C. Dupre in the men's team free rifle, were planned to join the rest of the athletes but did not start in their competitions.

=== Qualification ===
The athletics team was determined at the first athletics competition in Haiti, which was held by the Union Sportive Societies d'Haiti. The long jump was won by Silvio Cator, setting a distance of 7.3 metres, and was stated that he would be a "sensational figure in France." The 100 metres were then won by André Théard in 10.45 seconds, while Édouard Armand won the 800 metres in 1:58 and the 1500 metres in 4:02. The nation picked these athletes for competition at the Games, though the accuracy of the recorded marks is disputed. The government of Haiti paid US$1000 to fund their participation at the Games, while the rest of funds were paid by the athletes themselves.

The shooting team was determined through a two-day national rifle contest. Seven members of the Gendarmerie Port-au-Prince were trained in Port-au-Prince by Colonel Douglas C. McDougal of the United States. Prior to their training, the team had no knowledge on how to shoot a rifle. The team's expenses were paid for from all of the nation's gendarmes contributing five percent of their salary for five months.

== Athletics ==
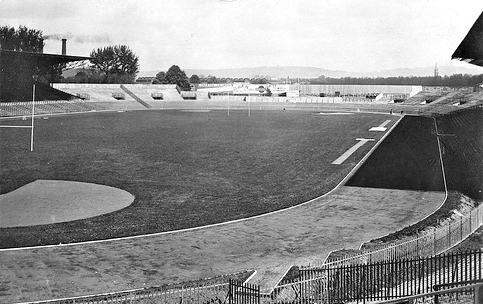
The Stade de Colombes, the site of the athletics events for the 1924 Summer Olympics

The athletics events were held at the Stade de Colombes. André Théard first competed in the men's 100 metres on 6 July, where he raced in the seventh heat and ran in a time of 11.2 seconds, placed third out of the five people and did not progress further. He then competed in the men's 200 metres two days later, where he raced in the seventeenth heat and ran in a time of 23.6 seconds, placed first and qualified for the next round. For the next round, he ran in the third qualifying stage, placed fourth and did not finish with a fast enough time to progress further.

For Édouard Armand, he first competed in the men's 800 metres on 6 July, where he raced in the first heat, placed seventh out of the seven competitors in the round, and did not finish with a fast enough time to progress further. He then competed in the men's 400 metres on 10 July, where he raced in the fourth heat, placed fourth out of the four competitors in the round, and once again did not finish with a fast enough time to progress further. For his last event, he competed in the men's decathlon from 11 to 12 July. He scored a total of 5207.895 points, and placed 23rd out of 36 competitors. He was also bound to compete in the men's 1500 metres and men's long jump but did not start in either event.

Silvio Cator first competed in the men's high jump on 6 July, jumped a height of 1.75 metres and tied for fifteenth but did not qualify further to the finals. He then competed in the men's long jump two days later, jumped a distance of 6.810 metres and placed 12th in the qualifiers, and did not progress to the final. He was also set to compete in the men's pentathlon but did not start.

Key

- Note–Ranks given for track events are within the athlete's heat only
- Q = Qualified for the next round
- q = Qualified for the next round as a fastest loser or, in field events, by position without achieving the qualifying target
- NR = National record
- N/A = Round not applicable for the event
- Bye = Athlete not required to compete in round

Track & road events

Athlete	Event	Heats		Quarterfinals		Semifinals		Final	
Athlete	Event	Result	Rank	Result	Rank	Result	Rank	Result	Rank
André Théard	Men's 100 m	11.2	3	Did not advance					
André Théard	Men's 200 m	23.6	1 Q	?	4	Did not advance			
Édouard Armand	Men's 400 m	?	4	Did not advance					
Édouard Armand	Men's 800 m	?	7	Did not advance					
Édouard Armand	Men's 1500 m	DNS		Did not advance					

Field events

Athlete	Event	Qualification		Final	
Athlete	Event	Distance	Position	Distance	Position
Édouard Armand	Men's long jump	DNS		Did not advance	
Silvio Cator	Men's long jump	6.810	12	Did not advance	
Silvio Cator	Men's high jump	1.75	=15	Did not advance	
Louis Déjoie	Men's pole vault	DNS		Did not advance	

Combined events – Men's pentathlon

Athlete	Event	LJ	JT	200 m	DT	1500 m	Final	Rank
Silvio Cator	Result	DNS	Did not advance					
Silvio Cator	Points	DNS	Did not advance					

Combined events – Men's decathlon

Athlete	Event	100 m	LJ	SP	HJ	400 m	110H	DT	PV	JT	1500 m	Final	Rank
Édouard Armand	Result	11.6	6.385	8.65	1.60	53.0	19.0	21.885	3.20	11.64	4:42.4	5207.895	23
Édouard Armand	Points	762.0	702.325	331.0	538	819.52	620	113.65	595.0	0.000	726.4	5207.895	23
Louis Déjoie	Result	DNS	Did not advance										
Louis Déjoie	Points	DNS	Did not advance										

== Shooting ==
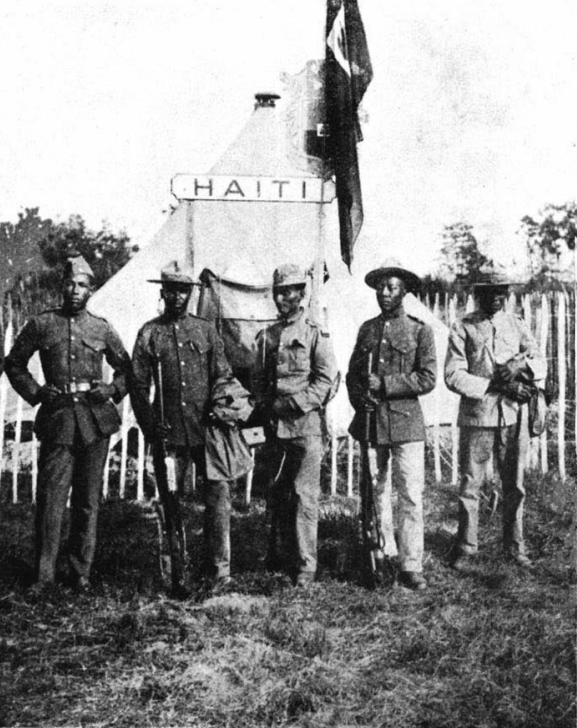
The Haitian rifle team that competed at the Games

The men's 600 m free rifle and team free rifle events were held at the camp de Châlons in Mourmelon-le-Grand. For the individual event on 27 July, out of a maximum 100 points, Ludovic Augustin scored 91 points and ranked fifth, Ludovic Valborge scored 90 points and tied for sixth, Destin Destine scored 86 points and tied for tenth, and Astrel Rolland scored 85 points and placed thirteenth.

At the team event, which lasted from 26 to 27 July, the team scored 240 points for the 400 metres, 220 points for the 600 metres, then 186 points for the 800 metres, and finished with a score of 646 out of a possible 750 points. They placed third behind the United States, who won gold, and France, who won the silver after a shoot-off with Haiti. The team earned the bronze medal, which was the nation's first Olympic medal. L. H. Clermont and C. Dupre were the two substitutes for the team.

Athlete	Event	Final	
Athlete	Event	Points	Rank
Ludovic Augustin	Men's 600 m free rifle	91	5
Ludovic Valborge	Men's 600 m free rifle	90	=6
Destin Destine	Men's 600 m free rifle	86	=10
Astrel Rolland	Men's 600 m free rifle	85	13
Ludovic Augustin; Ludovic Valborge; Destin Destine; Astrel Rolland; Eloi Metullus	Men's team free rifle	646	3rd place, bronze medalist(s)
L. H. Clermont; C. Dupre	Men's team free rifle	DNS	
