= South Africa at the 1924 Summer Olympics =

- IOC code: RSA (ZAF used at these Games)
- NOC: South African Olympic and Empire Games Association

in Paris
- Competitors: 30 in 7 sports
- Medals Ranked 18th: Gold 1 Silver 1 Bronze 1 Total 3

Summer Olympics appearances (overview)
- 1904; 1908; 1912; 1920; 1924; 1928; 1932; 1936; 1948; 1952; 1956; 1960; 1964–1988; 1992; 1996; 2000; 2004; 2008; 2012; 2016; 2020; 2024

South Africa was represented at the 1924 Summer Olympics in Paris, France by the South African Sports Confederation and Olympic Committee.

In total, 30 athletes – all men – represented South Africa in seven different sports including art, athletics, boxing, cycling, sailing, shooting and tennis.

South Africa won a total of three medals at the games after William Smith claimed gold in the boxing bantamweight category, Sydney Atkinson won silver in the men's 110 m hurdles and Cecil McMaster claimed bronze in the men's 10 km race walk.

== Competitors ==
In total, 30 athletes represented South Africa at the 1924 Summer Olympics in Paris, France across seven different sports.

| Sport | Men | Women | Total |
|---|---|---|---|
| Art | 1 | 0 | 1 |
| Athletics | 11 | 0 | 11 |
| Boxing | 5 | — | 5 |
| Cycling | 1 | 0 | 1 |
| Sailing | 1 | 0 | 1 |
| Shooting | 7 | 0 | 7 |
| Tennis | 4 | 0 | 4 |
| Total | 30 | 0 | 30 |

== Medalists ==
South Africa won a total of three medals at the games after William Smith claimed gold in the boxing bantamweight category, Sydney Atkinson won silver in the men's 110 m hurdles and Cecil McMaster claimed bronze in the men's 10 km race walk.

| Medal | Name | Sport | Event | Date |
|---|---|---|---|---|
| Gold | William Smith | Boxing | Bantamweight | 20 July |
| Silver | Sydney Atkinson | Athletics | Men's 110 m hurdles | 9 July |
| Bronze | Cecil McMaster | Athletics | Men's 10 km walk | 13 July |

== Art ==
In total, one South African athlete participated in the art competitions – Fanie Eloff in the sculpture category.

== Athletics ==
In total, 11 South African athletes participated in the athletics events – Sydney Atkinson in the men's 110 m hurdles, Toby Betts in the men's 100 m, the men's 400 m and the men's 4 × 100 m relay, Clifford Davis in the men's 800 m and the men's 1,500 m, George Dunston in the men's 100 m, the men's 200 m and men's 4 × 100 m relay, Howard Kinsman in the men's 200 m and the men's 4 × 100 m relay, Cecil McMaster in the men's 10 km race walk, Clarence Oldfield in the men's 400 m and the men's 800 m, Harry Phillips in the men's marathon, Len Richardson in the men's 3,000 m steeplechase and the men's individual cross country, Lawrence Roberts in the men's high jump, Christiaan Steyn in the men's 4 × 100 m relay and Ernest Sutherland in the decathlon.

| Athlete | Event | Heats | | Quarterfinals | | Semifinals | | Final | |
| Athlete | Event | Result | Rank | Result | Rank | Result | Rank | Result | Rank |
|---|---|---|---|---|---|---|---|---|---|
| Sydney Atkinson | 110 m hurdles | N/A | | 15.2 | 1 Q | 15.2 | 2 Q | 15.0 | 2nd place, silver medalist(s) |
| Toby Betts | 100 m | Unknown | 5 | did not advance | | | | | |
| Toby Betts | 400 m | 49.8 | 1 Q | 49.0 | 1 Q | 48.4 | 5 | did not advance | |
| Clifford Davis | 800 m | N/A | | Unknown | 4 | did not advance | | | |
| Clifford Davis | 1,500 m | N/A | | | | Unknown | 5 | did not advance | |
| George Dunston | 100 m | Unknown | 2 Q | Unknown | 4 | did not advance | | | |
| George Dunston | 200 m | Unknown | 2 Q | Unknown | 3 | did not advance | | | |
| Howard Kinsman | 200 m | 21.8 | 1 Q | Unknown | 2 Q | 22.3 | 5 | did not advance | |
| Cecil McMaster | 10 km walk | N/A | | | | Unknown | 2 Q | 49:08.0 | 3rd place, bronze medalist(s) |
| Clarence Oldfield | 400 m | 49.6 | 1 Q | 49.0 | 1 Q | 49.0 | 5 | did not advance | |
| Clarence Oldfield | 800 m | N/A | | 1:58.0 | 1 Q | Unknown | 6 | did not advance | |
| Harry Phillips | Marathon | N/A | | | | | | 3:07:13.0 | 19 |
| Len Richardson | 3,000 m steeplechase | N/A | | | | Unknown | 6 | did not advance | |
| Len Richardson | Cross country | N/A | | | | | | 37:46.0 | 9 |
| Lawrence Roberts | High jump | N/A | | | | 1.83 | 1 Q | 1.83 | 8 |
| Ernest Sutherland | Decathlon | N/A | | | | | | 6794.1425 | 5 |
| Toby Betts; George Dunston; Howard Kinsman; Christiaan Steyn | 4 × 100 m relay | N/A | | 42.8 | 1 Q | 43.6 | 4 | did not advance | |

== Boxing ==
In total, four South African athletes participated in the boxing events – Dick Beland in the lightweight category, Ernest Eustice in the featherweight category, Roy Ingram in the welterweight category and William H. Smith in the bantamweight category.

| Boxer | Weight class | Round of 32 | Round of 16 | Quarterfinals | Semifinals | Final / Bronze match | |
| Boxer | Weight class | Opposition Score | Opposition Score | Opposition Score | Opposition Score | Opposition Score | Rank |
|---|---|---|---|---|---|---|---|
| Dick Beland | Lightweight | Nilsen (NOR); W | Valdero (ESP); W | Tholey (FRA); L | did not advance | | 5 |
| Ernest Eustice | Featherweight | Depont (FRA); L | did not advance | | | | 17 |
| Roy Ingram | Welterweight | Rémy (BEL); W | Dam (NED); W | Delarge (BEL); L | did not advance | | 5 |
| William H. Smith | Bantamweight | Bye | Wolff (SWE); W | Lemouton (FRA); W | Ces (FRA); W | Tripoli (USA); W | 1st place, gold medalist(s) |

== Cycling ==
In total, one South African athlete participated in the cycling events – Henry Kaltenbrunn in the men's individual time trial and the men's 50 km.

=== Road cycling ===
| Cyclist | Event | Final | |
| Cyclist | Event | Result | Rank |
|---|---|---|---|
| Henry Kaltenbrunn | Time trial | 6:41:34.4 | 11 |

=== Track cycling ===
| Cyclist | Event | First round | | First repechage | | Quarterfinals | | Second repechage | | Semifinals | | Final | |
| Cyclist | Event | Result | Rank | Result | Rank | Result | Rank | Result | Rank | Result | Rank | Result | Rank |
|---|---|---|---|---|---|---|---|---|---|---|---|---|---|
| Henry Kaltenbrunn | 50 km | N/A | | | | | | | | | | Unknown | 8–36 |

== Sailing ==
In total, one South African athlete participated in the sailing events – Rupert Ellis-Brown in the Olympic monotype.

| Sailor | Event | Qualifying | | | | Final | | | |
| Sailor | Event | Race 1 | Race 2 | Race 3 | Total | Race 1 | Race 2 | Total | Rank |
|---|---|---|---|---|---|---|---|---|---|
| Rupert Ellis-Brown | Olympic monotype | 3 | 5 | N/A | | did not advance | | | |

== Shooting ==
In total, seven South African athletes participated in the shooting events – Eric Halley and David Smith in the men's 600 m free rifle and the men's team free rifle, John Stiray and James Trembath in the men's 600 m free rifle and George Church, Leslie Laing and Melville Wallace in the men's team free rifle.

| Shooter | Event | Final | |
| Shooter | Event | Score | Rank |
|---|---|---|---|
| Eric Halley | 600 m free rifle | 84 | 14 |
| David Smith | 600 m free rifle | 67 | 59 |
| John Stiray | 600 m free rifle | 74 | 48 |
| James Trembath | 600 m free rifle | 73 | 51 |
| George Church; Eric Halley; Leslie Laing; David Smith; Melville Wallace | Team free rifle | 590 | 9 |

== Tennis ==
In total, four South African athletes participated in the tennis events – John Condon, Louis Raymond, Ivie Richardson and Patrick Spence in the men's singles and the men's doubles.

| Athlete | Event | Round of 128 | Round of 64 | Round of 32 | Round of 16 | Quarterfinals | Semifinals | Final | |
| Athlete | Event | Opposition Score | Opposition Score | Opposition Score | Opposition Score | Opposition Score | Opposition Score | Opposition Score | Rank |
|---|---|---|---|---|---|---|---|---|---|
| John Condon | Singles | Cousin (FRA); L 6–4, 3–6, 2–6, 4–6 | did not advance | | | | | | |
| Louis Raymond | Singles | Willard (AUS); L 2–6, 6–4, 6–4, 2–6, 4–6 | did not advance | | | | | | |
| Ivie Richardson | Singles | Bye | Sindreu (ESP); W 6–4, 6–4, 6–3 | Cochet (FRA); L 3–6, 4–6, 4–6 | did not advance | | | | |
| Patrick Spence | Singles | Bye | Syz (SUI); W 6–3, 6–2, 7–5 | Woosnam (GBR); W 4–6, 10–8, 6–3, 3–6, 6–3 | Lacoste (FRA); L 2–6, 0–6, 1–6 | did not advance | | | |
| John Condon; Ivie Richardson | Doubles | —N/a | Bye | Torralva / Torralva (CHI); W 6–2, 6–1, 4–6, 6–2 | Flaquer / Saprisa (ESP); W 6–2, 6–3, 6–1 | Williams / Washburn (USA); W 4–6, 11–9, 4–6, 6–4, 6–4 | Brugnon / Cochet (FRA); L 7–5, 3–6, 5–7, 2–6 | Bronze medal final Lacoste / Borotra (FRA); L 3–6, 8–10, 3–6 | 4 |
