= Shooting at the 1924 Summer Olympics – Men's 600 metre free rifle prone =

Sports shooting at the Olympics

Men's 600 metre free rifle at the Games of the VIII Olympiad
- Venue: Camp de Châlons
- Date: 27 June 1924
- Competitors: 73 from 19 nations

Medalists
1st place, gold medalist(s)		Morris Fisher	United States
2nd place, silver medalist(s)		Carl Osburn	United States
3rd place, bronze medalist(s)		Niels Larsen	Denmark

The men's 600 metre free rifle prone was a shooting sports event held as part of the Shooting at the 1924 Summer Olympics programme. It was the only appearance of the event. The competition was held on 27 June 1924 at the shooting ranges at Camp de Châlons, Mourmelon. 73 shooters from 19 nations competed.

== Results ==
A maximum of four competitors per nation were allowed. Morris Fisher and Carl Osburn both set a new Olympic record with 95 rings.

Place	Shooter	Total	Shoot off
1	Morris Fisher (USA)	95	48
2	Carl Osburn (USA)	95	45
3	Niels Larsen (DEN)	94	
4	Walter Stokes (USA)	92	
5	Ludovic Augustin (HAI)	91	
6	Albert Courquin (FRA)	90	
6	Ludovic Valborge (HAI)	90	
8	Hugo Johansson (SWE)	88	
9	Alexander Martin (GBR)	87	
10	Giuseppe Laveni (ITA)	86	
10	Émile Rumeau (FRA)	86	
10	Destin Destine (HAI)	86	
13	Astrel Rolland (HAI)	85	
14	Alberto Coletti Conti (ITA)	84	
14	Eric Halley (RSA)	84	
14	Elemér Takács (HUN)	84	
14	Arthur Balbaert (BEL)	84	
14	Olle Ericsson (SWE)	84	
19	Constantin Țenescu (ROU)	83	
19	Mauritz Eriksson (SWE)	83	
19	Antti Valkama (FIN)	83	
19	François Lafortune (BEL)	83	
19	Halvard Angaard (NOR)	83	
24	Lars Jørgen Madsen (DEN)	82	
24	Paul Van Asbroeck (BEL)	82	
24	Anders Peter Nielsen (DEN)	82	
24	Dennis Fenton (USA)	82	
24	Thomas Northcote (GBR)	82	
24	Conrad Stucheli (SUI)	82	
24	Gerasimos Anagnostou (GRE)	82	
31	Andreas Vikhos (GRE)	81	
31	Veli Nieminen (FIN)	81	
31	Jakob Reich (SUI)	81	
34	Henry Douglas (GBR)	80	
35	Rezső Velez (HUN)	79	
35	Arnold Rösli (SUI)	79	
35	Josef Sucharda (TCH)	79	
35	Jaroslav Mach (TCH)	79	
35	Jean Theslöf (FIN)	79	
35	August Onsrud (NOR)	79	
41	Olaf Johannessen (NOR)	78	
41	Ioannis Theofilakis (GRE)	78	
41	Conrad Adriaenssens (BEL)	78	
44	Heikki Huttunen (FIN)	77	
45	Hendrik de Grijff (NED)	76	
46	Erik Sætter-Lassen (DEN)	75	
46	Rudolf Jelen (TCH)	75	
48	John Stiray (RSA)	74	
48	Gustaf Andersson (SWE)	74	
48	Alexandros Theofilakis (GRE)	74	
51	Otto Olsen (NOR)	73	
51	Albert Tröndle (SUI)	73	
51	James Trembath (RSA)	73	
51	Ricardo Ticchi (ITA)	73	
55	Simion Vartolomeu (ROU)	70	
55	Sándor Prokopp (HUN)	70	
55	António Ferreira (POR)	70	
58	Stanisław Kowalczewski (POL)	69	
59	David Smith (RSA)	67	
60	František Čermák (TCH)	66	
60	Marian Borzemski (POL)	66	
62	Dario Canas (POR)	65	
63	Eugeniusz Waszkiewicz (POL)	64	
63	Johannes Scheuter (NED)	64	
65	Władysław Świątek (POL)	62	
65	Carel de Iongh (NED)	62	
65	Sem De Ranieri (ITA)	62	
68	Vasile Ghițescu (ROU)	57	
69	Francisco António Real (POR)	55	
69	Albert Langereis (NED)	55	
71	Manuel Guerra (POR)	50	
–	Georges Roes (FRA)	DNF	
–	Alexandru Vatamanu (ROU)	DNF	
