= Culture of Haiti =

Haitian culture is a creolized blend of primarily French and African cultures

The culture of Haiti is a creolized blend of African, European and Indigenous elements due to the French colonization of Amerindian land (which was then renamed Saint-Domingue), in conjunction with the large diverse enslaved African population who had later freed themselves by a successful revolt. These attributions have largely influenced the art, cuisine, literature, music, religion as well as the languages of Haiti.

== Language ==
Two languages are spoken in Haiti. French is taught in schools and known by about 42% of the population, but spoken by a minority of black and biracial residents, in Port-au-Prince and other cities. Haitian Creole, with roots in French, Spanish, Taíno, Portuguese, English, and African languages, is a language with dialectal forms in different regions. It is spoken throughout the country, but is used extensively in rural areas.

WIKITONGUES- Castelline speaking Haitian Creole

== Art ==
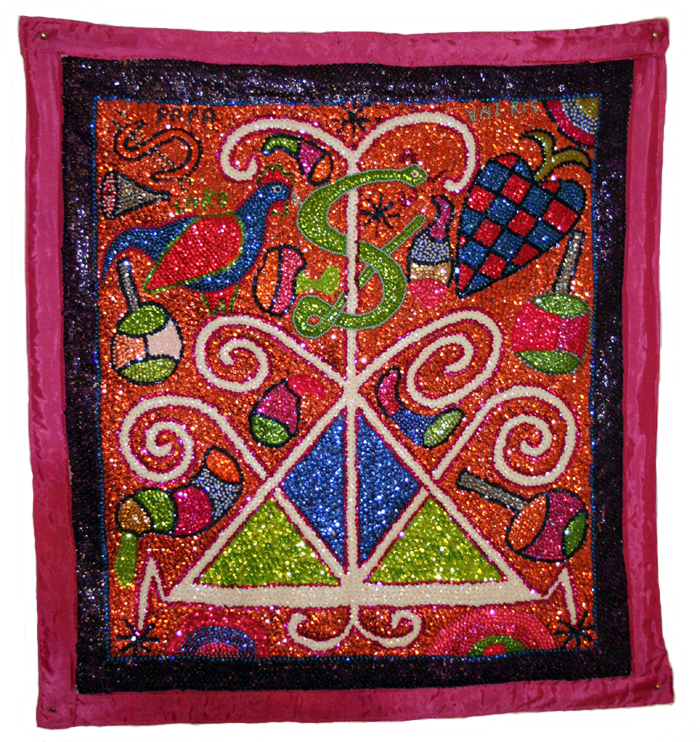
A large sequined Vodou "drapeau" or flag, created by artist George Valris

Brilliant colors, naïve perspective, and sly humor characterize Haitian art. Big, delectable foods and lush landscapes are favorite subjects. Going to market is the most social activity of country life, and figures prominently into the subject matter. Jungle animals, rituals, dances, and gods evoke the African past in Haitian art.

Artists paint in fable as well. People are disguised as animals and animals are transformed into people. Symbols take on great meaning. For example, a rooster often represents Aristide and the red and blue colors of the flag of Haiti, often represent his Lavalas party.

Many artists cluster in 'school' of painting, such as the Cap-Haïtien school, which features depictions of daily life in the city, the Jacmel School, which reflects the steep mountains and bays of that coastal town, or the Saint-Soleil School, which is characterized by abstracted human forms, and is heavily influenced by Vodou symbolism.

=== Architecture ===
Haiti's most famous monuments are the Sans-Souci Palace and the Citadelle Laferrière, inscribed as a World Heritage Site in 1982. Situated in the Northern Massif de la Hotte, in one of Haiti's National Parks, the structures date from the early 19th century. The buildings were among the first to be built after Haiti's independence from France.

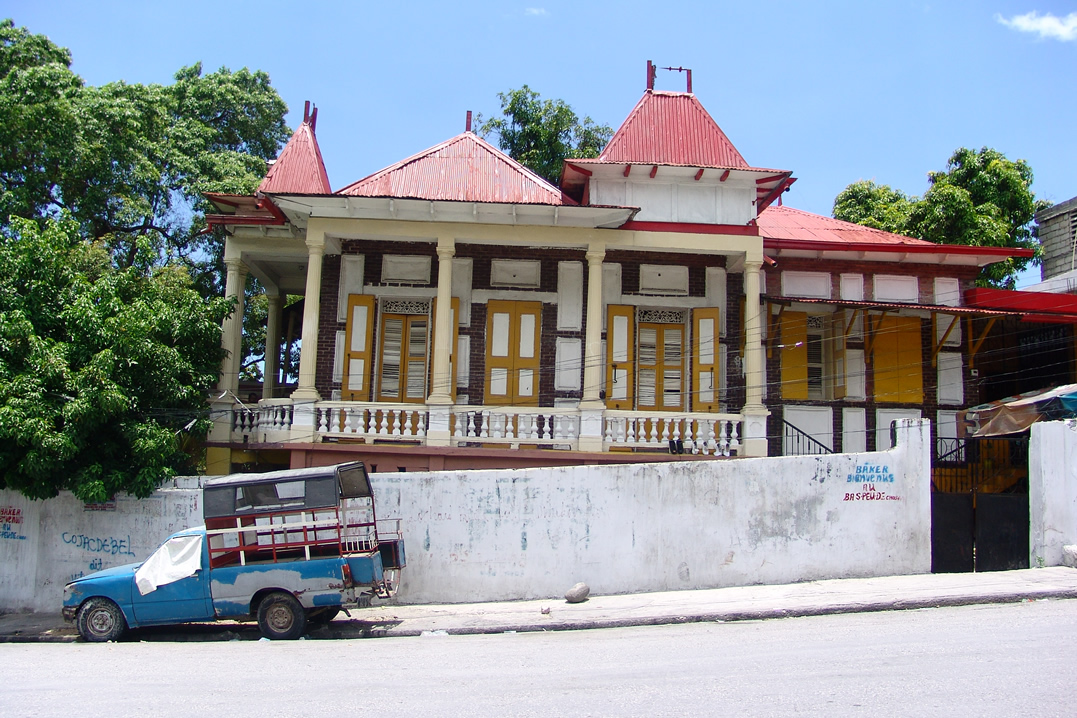
A one story gingerbread house in Place Jérémie of Port-au-Prince, Haiti

Jacmel, the colonial city that was tentatively accepted as a World Heritage site, is reported to be extensively damaged by the 2010 Haiti earthquake.

Residential buildings of wealthy individuals in Haiti during the Gingerbread era, between the 1880s and the 1920s, had a unique architecture that combined the local traditions and adaptation of foreign influences. The adaptation was influenced by many factors including manuals of styles that were circulated from Europe and North America, Haitian architects who studied abroad, and French artisans who set up woodworking shops to train Haitian artisans. Those Gingerbread houses were highly decorative with fretworks, latticeworks with patterns that are unique to Haiti. The structures of this style typically have large windows and doors, tall ceilings, large attics, and deep porches.

Since the earthquake of 2010, architecture has taken a huge turn. With damages at an estimated 10 million dollars, architectural measures were taken immediately. Directly after the earthquake Article 25 of the UK gained about 350 architects in 2010 looking to help rebuild Haiti. There was also a great effort made by the U.S. through the Architecture for Humanity effort that was initiated after the earthquake. The architecture style became very reasonable and involved minimalistic and functional style to help rebuild the damage in the most efficient way possible. There has also been a strong initiative to build more open-air clinics that are designed with health precautions as a huge priority.

=== Cuisine ===
The French influences in Haiti are present in their cuisine, but more so it is representative of their location in the Caribbean. They do however have their own flavor as a result of the lack of Spanish influence on their island compared to others in the Caribbean. The cooking style used in Haiti is predominately Creole and includes heavy use of pepper in the majority of their dishes. A main staple in Haiti Is starch, and many of their dishes include potatoes, rice, corn, beans, and plantains.

There is also a strong presence of tropical fruits in their cuisine due to their ability to grow in the tropical climate. This includes pineapples, coconuts, mangoes, and other fruits that are used for many dishes and beverages. Food also has importance in religious and status-symbol type forms. Foods that are considered delicacies in Haiti include French inspired cheeses and meats and are a symbol of money and power. Typically these types of meals are only served in the richest part of Haiti, namely in the capital of Port-au-Prince. As far as religious meals go, the Catholics in Haiti typically enjoy more elaborate meals during Christmas Eve.

=== Fashion ===
Haitian fashion incorporates a range of fabrics, colors and garment styles, including designs that make extensive use of volume and ruffles. Contemporary Haitian designers have also incorporated environmentally-friendly materials and production processes, alongside influences from local cultural traditions.

In Haiti, there is a variety of fashion ranging from the more traditional attire to the day-to-day clothing. The traditional female attire consist of Quadrille (or Karabela) dress. The dresses are made of a sturdy material that mainly comes in blue and red, which is usually made from an off-the-shoulder top or bodice with a full matching skirt that is embellished with additional ruffles, lace, or rickrack to add color and visual appeal. A head-scarf or turban can also be worn especially in the more rural areas of Haiti for both traditional and day-to-day use. The traditional male attire consists of a wedding shirt (guayabera) made of lightweight fabrics and are worn untucked with a jacket of any color on top.

Haiti's textile industry and its moniker ‘Made In Haiti’ has been long-established in being a key export for the country which has focused on low-end commodity apparel through the use of its low-wage sweatshops that have sewed for some of the American apparel brands such as American Eagle Outfitters, Calvin Klein, DKNY, Hanes, Levi Strauss & Co., Nordstrom and Ralph Lauren.

The typical day-to-day clothes that most Haitians wear are second-hand clothes that are known as pepe. Largely stemming from the 1960s, the practice of sending and receiving pepe began. Today, you can find pepe being sold by street vendors at a price that is affordable for most Haitians. The majority of pepe that arrive on the island have been donated by Americans to charities and collection centers."

=== Literature ===
The first document of Haitian literature is the collective text Acte de l'Indépendance de la République d'Haïti (Haitian Declaration of Independence). Since then, Haitian literary culture has continued to grow, recognized both at home and abroad with award-winning authors and large-scale literary events locally and internationally.

=== Music ===
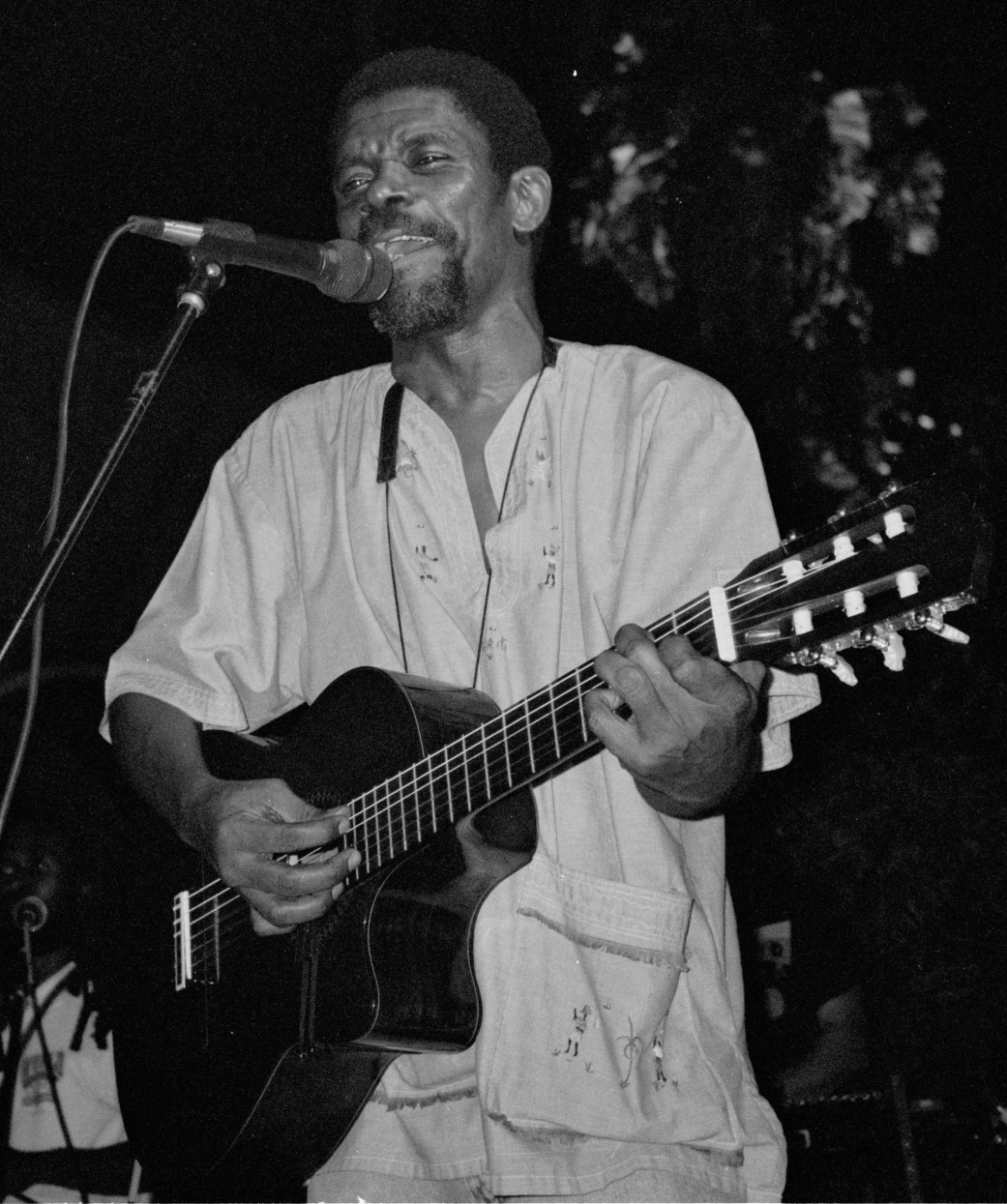
Haitian folk singer Manno Charlemagne

Haitian music combines a wide range of influences drawn from the many people who have settled on this Caribbean island. It reflects French, African rhythms, Spanish elements and others who have inhabited the island of Hispaniola and minor Indigenous influences. Styles of music unique to the nation of Haiti include music derived from Vodou ceremonial traditions, rara parading music, twoubadou ballads, mini-jazz rock bands, rasin movement, hip hop kreyòl, the wildly popular compas, and méringue as its basic rhythm.

Very popular today is compas, short for compas direct, made popular by Nemours Jean-Baptiste, on a recording released in 1955. The name derives from compás, the Spanish word meaning rhythm or tones. It involves mostly medium-to-fast tempo beats with an emphasis on electric guitars, synthesizers, and either a solo alto saxophone, a horn section or the synthesizer equivalent. In Creole, it is spelled as konpa dirèk or simply konpa. It is commonly spelled as it is pronounced as kompa.

=== Dance ===
Dancing is an important part of Haitian social life. Used for celebrations such as church socials and informal parties, rituals, as well as evenings out with friends. In small restaurants, social dance music is provided by relatively small twoubadou groups, while larger clubs with big dance floors often feature dance bands reminiscent of the Tropicana Club of Havana, Cuba. Social dance music has been one of the most heavily creolized music forms in Haiti. Creolized dance forms mixed from African traditions, Indigenous, European and developed distinct local origins:

- European dance forms such as the contradanse (kontradans), quadrille, waltz, and polka were introduced to white planter audiences during the colonial period.
- In the case of Vodou, the spiritual belief is usually accompanied by dancing, singing, and drumming rooted from the dance styles of African dance.

In the decades after 1804, when Haiti became the first independent black republic, southern whites in the United States were concerned that the example of a successful slave insurrection would inspire a similar revolt on their plantations. Since the early nineteenth century, then, white U.S. fiction about Haiti has been concerned with the depiction of Haitians as savages, consumed by a thirst for white blood. Negative stereotyping of Haitians by white writers has persisted to the present in the form of movies and books that transform the religion of Haitians from a healing ceremony into a satanic ritual.

— Peter Manuel Michael, Caribbean Currents: Caribbean Music from Rumba to Reggae
- Carnival and rara celebrations feature exuberant dancing and movement in the streets that originate from Catholic celebrations.
- One of the most popular African-influenced dance styles was the méringue (mereng in Creole). Along with the carabinier, the méringue was a favorite dance style of the Haitian elite and was a regular feature at elite dances. The Haitian expression, Mereng ouvri bal, mereng fème bal; (The mereng opens the ball, the mereng closes the ball) alludes to the popularity and ubiquity of the méringue.

== Festivals ==
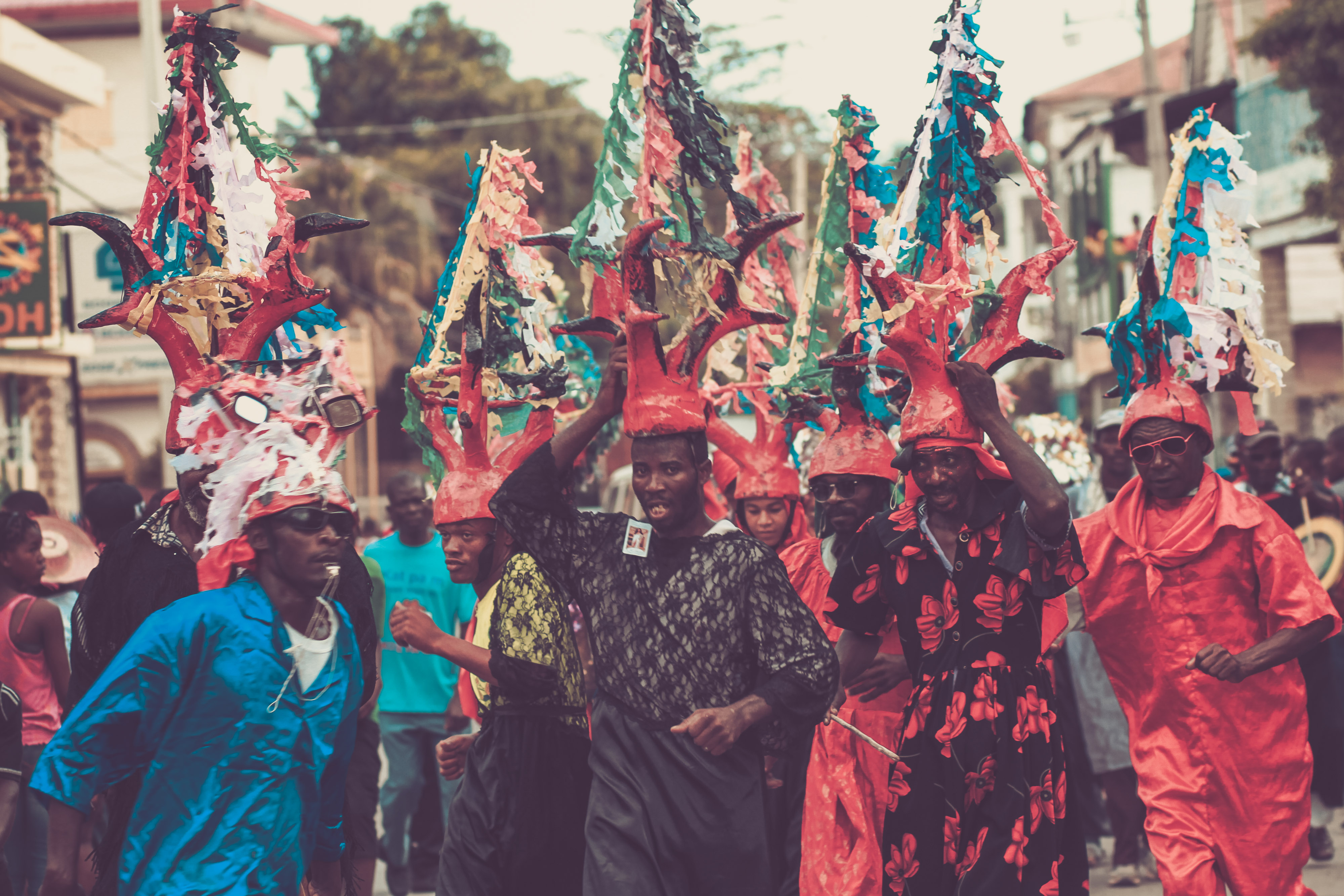
Kanaval in Jacmel Haiti 2014 03

The most festive time of the year in Haiti is during Carnival (referred to as Kanaval in Haitian Creole or Mardi Gras). The festivities start in February. The cities are filled with music, parade floats, and people dancing and singing in the streets. Carnival week is traditionally a time of all-night parties and escape from daily life. This is a significant time for Haitian musicians for an opportunity to showcase their talents and expand their audience by performing for Carnival crowds. Rara, a festival which occurs before Easter, is celebrated by a significant number of the population as well, and its celebration has been led to rara music becoming a style of Carnival music. Many of the youth also attend parties and enjoy themselves at nightclubs called discos, (pronounced "deece-ko") (not like the discos of the U.S), and attend Bal. This term derives from the word ballad, and these events are often celebrated by crowds of many people.

Music Festivals of Haiti
Carnaval des Fleurs	Kanaval	Koudyay	Rasin Festival
Jacob's Pillow Dance Festival	Kompa	Kalenda	
Port-au-Prince International Jazz Festival	Rara	Rabòday	Rara an deyò
Haitian Defile Kanaval	Fèt Drapo	Fèt Gede	
Plaine-du-Nord Festival	Fèt Chanpèt	Fèt Patwonal	

== Religion ==
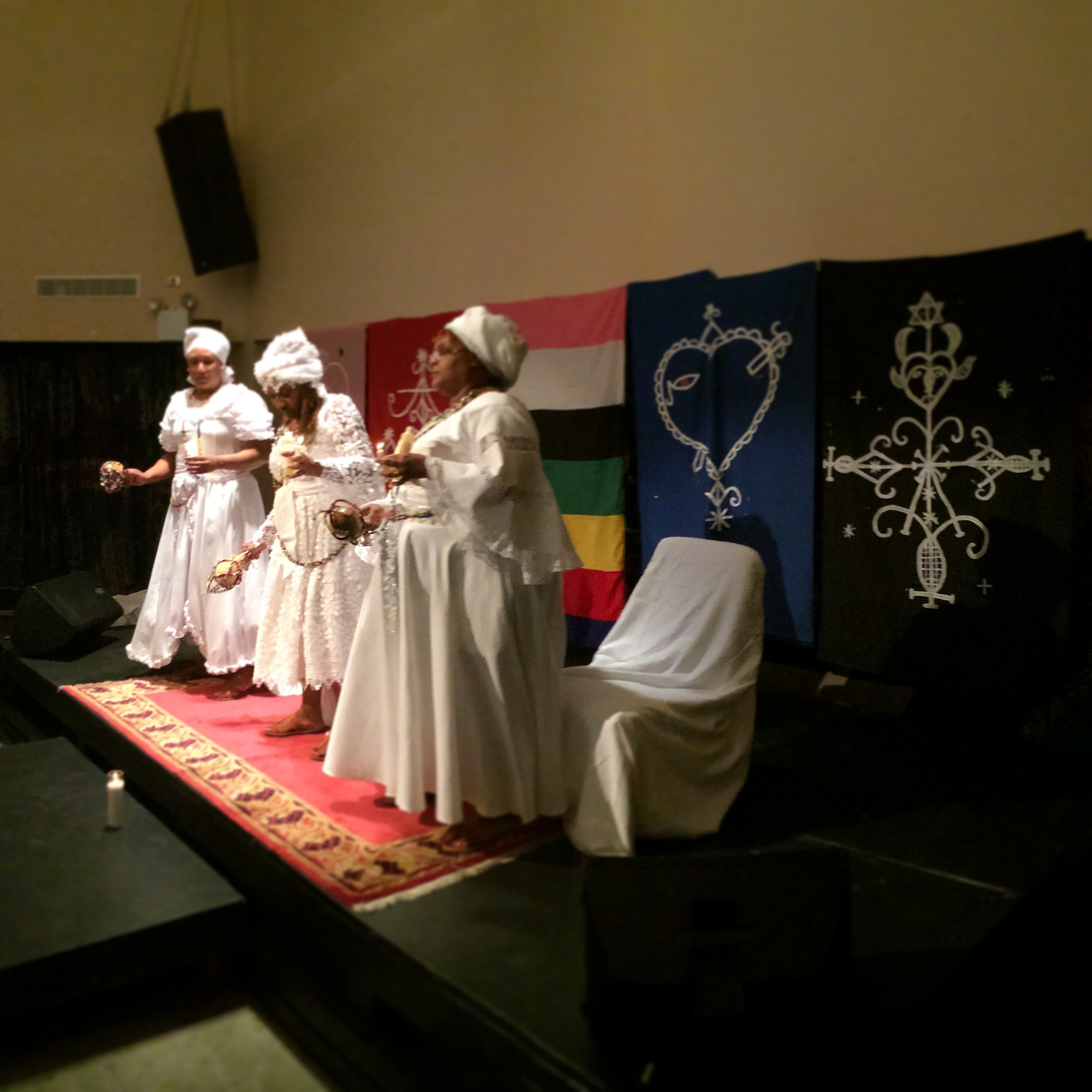
Swearing-in ceremony of Haitian Diaspora GwètòDe (Clergy in Vodou)

Haiti is known for its rich folklore traditions. The country has many magical tales that are part of the Haitian Vodou tradition.Vodou, encompassing several different traditions, consists of a mix of Central and Western African, European, and Indigenous (Taíno) religions is also widely practiced, despite the negative stigma that it carries both in and out of the country. The exact number of Vodou practitioners is unknown; however, it is believed that a large amount of the population practice it, often alongside their Christian faith. Some secular Christians also have been known to participate in some rituals, although indirectly.

Haiti is similar to the rest of Latin America, in that it is a predominantly Christian country (96%), with 80% Roman Catholic and approximately 16% professing Protestantism. A small population of Muslims and Hindus exist in the country, principally in the capital of Port-au-Prince.

== Traditional knowledge ==
Haiti's traditional knowledge found its first prominent champion in the ethnographer Jean Price-Mars, whose seminal So spoke the uncle (in French Ainsi parla L'oncle) argued in favor of a greater respect and appreciation of Haiti's African-rooted, largely oral-based peasant culture. Since then numerous authors and thinkers have documented the country's rich and complex traditional knowledge, whether it be in its approach to education and morality, architecture and construction, or botany and medicine.

== Sports ==
Football is the most popular sport in Haiti, though basketball is growing in popularity. Hundreds of small football clubs compete at the local level. Stade Sylvio Cator is the multi-purpose stadium in Port-au-Prince, Haiti, where it is currently used mostly for association football matches that fits a capacity of 30,000 people.

Samuel Dalembert and Olden Polynice are former NBA players born in Haiti.

Haitian football player Joseph Gaetjens played for the United States national team in the 1950 FIFA World Cup, scoring the winning goal in the 1–0 upset of England.

In the early 20th century, it was reported that cockfighting was also a popular sport, though its popularity has since faded.

Ludovic Augustin, Ludovic Valborge, Destin Destine, Astrel Rolland, Eloi Metullus won the country's first Olympic Medal in the Men's team free rifle at the 1924 Summer Olympics.

Silvio Cator was a Haitian long jumper who won gold in the men's Long Jump at the 1928 Summer Olympics. He is also a former world record holder in the event.

Dudley Dorival is the first Haitian to win a World Champion Medal at the 2001 World Championships in Athletics in the men's 110m Hurdles.

1996 Olympic Games Gold Medalist for Canada Bruny Surin was born in Cap-Haïtien. He also Holds the National Record over 100m for Canada.

Olympian, Pan American Games medalist and World Indoor Championship Gold Medalist Barbara Pierre was born in Haiti. She also represented Haiti at the 2008 Olympic Games.

2020 Olympic Games Gold Medalist Wadeline Jonathas was born in Gonaïves.

Former NFL players Pierre Garçon and Elvis Dumervil are of Haitian descent.

Professional boxer Andre Berto is of Haitian descent.

== See also ==
- Tourism in Haiti
- Public holidays in Haiti
- Museums in Haiti
- Cinema of Haiti
- Haitian literature
- Media of Haiti
- Tezin Nan Dlo
- Madan Sara, women who market agricultural produce

== Sources ==
- Kelsey, Carl (1921) "The American Intervention in Haiti and the Dominican Republic" in American Academy of Political and Social Science; National American Woman Suffrage Association Collection (Library of Congress) (March 1922). Annals of the American Academy of Political and Social Science. Vol. C. Published by A.L. Hummel for the American Academy of Political and Social Science. pp. 109–202.
