= Thomas Northcote =

Thomas Northcote may refer to:

- Thomas Northcote (silversmith) (1749–1798), British silversmith
- Thomas Northcote (sport shooter) (1893–1991), British Olympic sports shooter

== See also ==
- Northcote W. Thomas (1868–1936), British anthropologist and psychical researcher
