= Shooting at the 1924 Summer Olympics – Men's team free rifle =

Men's team free rifle at the Games of the VIII Olympiad
- Venue: Camp de Châlons
- Dates: 26–27 June 1924
- Competitors: 88 from 18 nations

Medalists
1st place, gold medalist(s)		Raymond Coulter, Joseph Crockett, Morris Fisher, Sidney Hinds, Walter Stokes; United States
2nd place, silver medalist(s)		Paul Colas, Albert Courquin, Pierre Hardy, Georges Roes, Émile Rumeau; France
3rd place, bronze medalist(s)		Ludovic Augustin, Destin Destine, Eloi Metullus, Astrel Rolland, Ludovic Valborge; Haiti

The men's team free rifle was a shooting sports event held as part of the Shooting at the 1924 Summer Olympics programme. It was the fifth appearance of a rifle team event but the first with three different distances (400 m, 600 m, and 800 m). The competition was held on 26 and 27 June 1924 at the shooting ranges at Camp de Châlons, Mourmelon. 88 shooters competed for 18 nations.

== Results ==
The scores of the five shooters on each team were summed to give a team score. No further shooting was done. The maximum score was 750. Hungary was allowed to compete with an incomplete team.

All American shooters finished in top ten position. An individual event would have been won by Morris Fisher followed up by Walter Stokes and the Swedish shooter Hugo Johansson. Sidney Hinds' perfect score of 50 came after he was accidentally shot in the foot during the competition, when a Belgian competitor next to him accidentally discharged his gun when arguing with an official.

Place	Shooter	400 m		600 m		800 m		Total	
Place	Shooter	Score	Rank	Score	Rank	Score	Rank	Score	Rank
1
1	United States	245	1	225	1	206	1	676	
1	Morris Fisher	50	1	47	3	45	1	142	1
1	Walter Stokes	49	8	49	1	40	7	138	2
1	Joseph Crockett	47	26	45	7	41	4	133	7
1	Raymond Coulter	49	8	44	12	39	13	132	8
1	Sidney Hinds	50	1	40	36	41	4	131	9
2
2	France	243	2	214	4	187	2	646	
2	Émile Rumeau	50	1	44	12	40	7	134	6
2	Albert Courquin	48	17	42	24	41	4	131	9
2	Pierre Hardy	49	8	41	33	40	7	130	12
2	Georges Roes	50	1	44	12	32	40	126	23
2	Paul Colas	46	38	43	20	36	21	125	26
3
3	Haiti	240	3	220	2	186	3	646	
3	Ludovic Augustin	48	17	44	12	43	3	135	4
3	Astrel Rolland	48	17	42	24	39	13	129	15
3	Ludovic Valborge	49	8	43	20	36	21	128	16
3	Destin Destine	47	26	45	7	36	21	128	16
3	Eloi Metullus	48	17	46	4	32	40	126	23
4
4	Switzerland	240	4	210	6	185	4	635	
4	Jakob Reich	47	26	44	12	44	2	135	4
4	Arnold Rösli	49	8	41	33	38	16	128	16
4	Willy Schnyder	47	26	45	7	35	27	127	20
4	Conrad Stucheli	47	26	43	20	35	27	125	26
4	Albert Tröndle	50	1	37	52	33	36	120	38
5
5	Finland	240	4	208	7	180	5	628	
5	Antti Valkama	49	8	43	20	38	16	130	12
5	Veli Nieminen	49	8	42	24	37	19	128	16
5	Voitto Kolho	46	38	39	40	40	7	125	26
5	Heikki Huttunen	48	17	44	12	31	46	123	32
5	Jean Theslöf	48	17	40	36	34	33	122	34
6
6	Denmark	234	7	215	3	177	6	626	
6	Niels Larsen	50	1	45	7	35	27	130	12
6	Lars Jørgen Madsen	45	45	44	12	38	16	127	20
6	Anders Peter Nielsen	46	38	38	47	40	7	124	29
6	Erik Sætter-Lassen	47	26	46	4	31	46	124	29
6	Peter Petersen	46	38	42	24	33	26	121	37
7
7	Sweden	239	6	211	5	173	7	623	
7	Hugo Johansson	50	1	48	2	39	13	137	3
7	Ivar Wester	45	45	46	4	40	7	131	9
7	Mauritz Eriksson	47	26	42	24	37	19	126	23
7	Olle Ericsson	48	17	36	55	31	46	115	47
7	Gustaf Andersson	49	8	39	40	26	62	114	49
8
8	Norway	230	8	204	8	160	9	594	
8	Ludvig Larsen	47	26	42	24	34	33	123	32
8	Olaf Johannessen	47	26	40	36	35	27	122	34
8	Willy Røgeberg	46	38	41	33	32	40	119	39
8	Halvard Angaard	44	50	42	24	31	46	117	42
8	Otto Olsen	46	38	39	40	28	59	113	50
9
9	South Africa	227	9	197	9	166	8	590	
9	Leslie Laing	49	8	42	24	36	21	127	20
9	Eric Halley	44	50	44	12	36	21	124	29
9	David Smith	48	17	36	55	32	40	116	45
9	George Church	43	59	39	40	31	46	113	50
9	Melville Wallace	43	59	36	55	31	46	110	54
10
10	Italy	226	10	195	10	157	10	578	
10	Sem De Ranieri	47	26	45	7	30	55	122	34
10	Ricardo Ticchi	44	50	39	40	36	21	119	39
10	Giuseppe Laveni	48	17	38	47	30	55	116	45
10	Alberto Coletti Conti	43	59	37	52	33	36	113	50
10	Camillo Isnardi	44	50	36	55	28	59	108	56
11
11	Belgium	217	12	186	11	147	12	550	
11	Paul Van Asbroeck	47	26	39	40	32	40	118	41
11	François Lafortune	46	38	42	24	29	58	117	42
11	Conrad Adriaenssens	45	45	40	36	32	40	117	42
11	Arthur Balbaert	42	67	33	65	31	46	106	57
11	Charles Scheirlinck	37	81	32	67	23	73	92	79
12
12	Greece	218	11	169	13	139	13	526	
12	Ioannis Theofilakis	47	26	33	65	35	27	115	47
12	Alexandros Theofilakis	45	45	35	60	31	46	111	53
12	Georgios Anitsas	44	50	38	47	21	78	103	60
12	Georgios Moraitinis	40	75	35	60	25	66	100	69
12	Andreas Vikhos	42	67	28	79	27	61	97	70
13
13	Romania	208	13	163	14	153	11	524	
13	Alexandru Vatamanu	44	50	34	63	31	46	109	55
13	Constantin Țenescu	39	77	32	67	35	27	106	57
13	Simion Vartolomeu	44	50	30	74	30	55	104	59
13	Mihai Plătăreanu	38	78	32	67	33	36	103	60
13	Vasile Ghițescu	43	59	35	60	24	69	102	65
14
14	Czechoslovakia	208	13	172	12	121	15	501	
14	Jaroslav Mach	41	72	36	55	26	62	103	60
14	Josef Sucharda	42	67	37	52	24	69	103	60
14	František Čermák	44	50	32	67	26	63	102	65
14	Antonín Byczanski	43	59	38	47	20	80	101	67
14	Josef Kozlík	38	78	29	78	25	66	92	79
15
15	Poland	205	16	142	16	130	14	477	
15	Marian Borzemski	37	81	30	74	34	33	101	67
15	Stanisław Kowalczewski	42	67	30	74	24	69	96	72
15	Franciszek Brożek	43	59	25	81	26	62	94	73
15	Bolesław Gościewicz	38	78	32	67	23	73	93	76
15	Władysław Świątek	45	45	25	81	23	73	93	76
16
16	Netherlands	191	17	157	15	110	16	458	
16	Albert Langereis	42	67	39	40	22	76	103	60
16	Carel de Iongh	41	72	32	67	21	78	94	73
16	Gerrit Bouwhuis	32	85	38	47	20	80	90	81
16	François Kortleven	40	75	21	83	25	66	86	82
16	Adrianus van Korlaar	36	83	27	80	22	76	85	83
17
17	Portugal	207	15	135	17	85	17	427	
17	Dario Canas	43	59	30	74	24	69	97	70
17	Manuel Guerra	44	50	31	73	19	82	94	73
17	António Ferreira	41	72	34	63	18	83	93	76
17	Félix Bermudes	43	59	21	83	12	84	76	84
17	Francisco António Real	36	83	19	85	12	84	67	85
–
–	Hungary	88	-	98	-	90	-	276	
–	Rezső Velez	45	-	36	-	32	-	113	-
–	Elemér Takács	43	-	31	-	28	-	102	-
–	Sándor Prokopp	-	-	31	-	30	-	61	-
