= Olaf Johannessen =

Olaf Johannessen may refer to:

- Olaf Johannessen (sport shooter) (1890–1977), Norwegian sport shooter
- Olaf Johannessen (actor) (born 1961), Faroese stage and film actor
