= Sidney Hinds =

American sport shooter

Sidney Rae Hinds
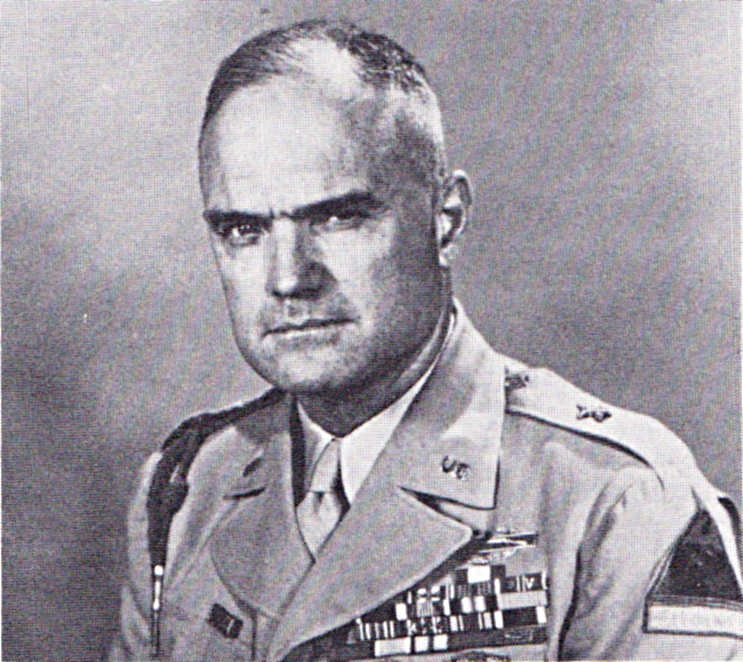
- Born: May 14, 1900; Newton, Illinois, US
- Died: February 17, 1991 (aged 90); San Antonio, Texas, US
- Military career
- Allegiance: United States of America
- Branch: United States Army
- Service years: 1920–1947
- Rank: Brigadier General
- Service number: 0-12851
- Commands: Combat Command B, 2nd Armored Division
- Conflicts: World War I World War II: Operation Torch; Invasion of Sicily; Battle of Normandy; Battle of the Bulge; Western Allied invasion of Germany
- Awards: Army Distinguished Service Medal; Silver Star (4); Legion of Merit (2); Bronze Star (3)

Sidney Rae Hinds (May 14, 1900 – February 17, 1991) was an American highly decorated officer of the United States Army with the rank of brigadier general. He was also sport shooter who competed in the 1924 Summer Olympics and won the gold medal in the team rifle competition.

== Early life ==
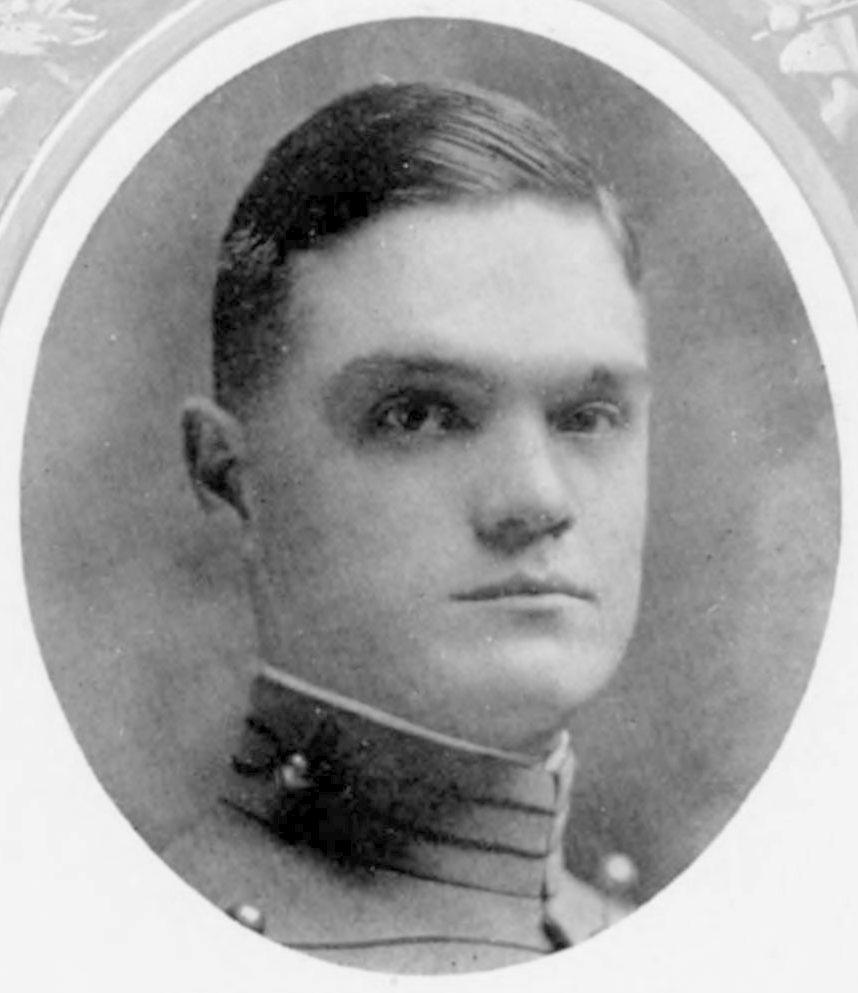
At West Point in 1920

Sidney Rae Hinds was born on May 14, 1900, in Newton, Illinois, as the son of Daniel C. and Elizabeth (Jackson) Hinds. He spent his high school years in Wahpeton, North Dakota, and when he was eighteen years old, he received an appointment from Congressman John Miller Baer to the United States Military Academy at West Point, New York. World War I changed the length of the studies and Hinds graduated in June 1920. He was also commissioned a second lieutenant in infantry.

His class of 1920 was very strong, producing 49 general officers, including Lyman L. Lemnitzer, Clovis E. Byers, Henry I. Hodes, Lawrence J. Carr, Halley G. Maddox, Edward J. McGaw, Verne D. Mudge, Richard C. Partridge, Ewart G. Plank, William W. Bessell, Jr., John F. Cassidy, Rex V. Corput, Jr., Francis W. Farrell, William W. Ford, Charles K. Gailey, Joseph E. Harriman, Frederick M. Harris, Sherman V. Hasbrouck, Frederick L. Hayden, Homer W. Kiefer and Maurice W. Daniel.

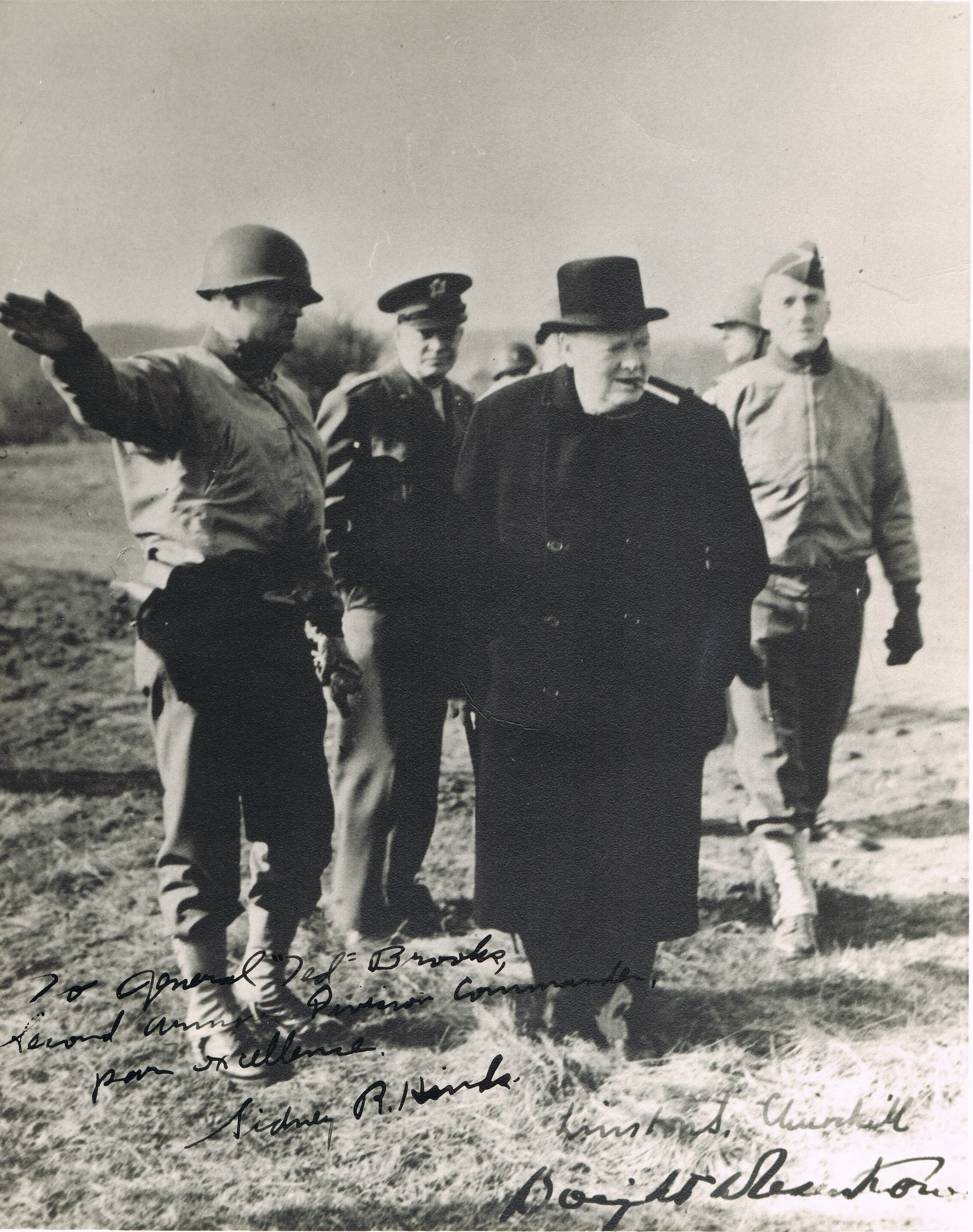
Colonel Sidney Hinds, General Dwight D. Eisenhower, Prime Minister Winston Churchill and Major General Edward H. Brooks overseeing preparations for D-Day

Olympic medal record

Representing United States

Men's shooting
Gold medal – first place	1924 Paris	Team free rifle

In 1924 he participated in the Summer Olympics and won the gold medal as a member of the American team in the team free rifle competition. His gold medal in on display at the US Army Infantry Museum at Fort Benning, Georgia.

He died in San Antonio, Texas, on February 15, 1991, and is buried at Fort Sam Houston National Cemetery.

During World War II he saved the German town Ahlen by believing the German Dr. Paul Rosenbaum who was responsible for the hospital town. In the early 1990s the park in front of the station in Ahlen was named after him.

== Medals and decorations ==
Here is the ribbon bar of Brigadier general Sidney Rae Hinds:

Combat Infantryman Badge
1st Row	Army Distinguished Service Medal			
2nd Row	Silver Star with three Oak Leaf Clusters	Legion of Merit with Oak Leaf Cluster	Bronze Star with two Oak Leaf Clusters and "V" Device	Purple Heart
3rd Row	Army Commendation Medal with Oak Leaf Cluster	World War I Victory Medal	American Defense Service Medal	American Campaign Medal
4th Row	European-African-Middle Eastern Campaign Medal with eight service stars and Arrowhead device	World War II Victory Medal	Army of Occupation Medal	Chevalier of Legion of Honour
5th Row	French Croix de guerre 1939-1945 with Palm	Belgian Croix de guerre 1940–1945 with Palm	Knight of the Order of Orange-Nassau	Order of Alexander Nevsky (USSR)
Presidential Unit Citation
