= Homer W. Kiefer =

US Army major general

- Kiefer as a major general, c. 1952
- Born: 20 November 1898; Attica, Ohio, US
- Died: 22 September 1976 (aged 77); Clearwater, Florida, US
- Burial place: Arlington National Cemetery
- Education: United States Military Academy
- Spouse: Rosamund Burt (m. 1922–1976)
- Children: 2
- Relatives: Thomas Tackaberry (son-in-law)
- Military career
- Service: Ohio National Guard; United States Army
- Service years: 1917–1918 (National Guard); 1920–1953 (Army)
- Rank: Major General
- Service number: O12701
- Unit: US Army Field Artillery Branch
- Commands: Battery B, 18th Field Artillery Regiment; 2nd Battalion, 11th Field Artillery Regiment; 24th Infantry Division Artillery; War Department Personnel Center, Fort Lewis; 7th Infantry Division Artillery; 9th Infantry Division
- Conflicts: World War I World War II; Occupation of Japan; Korean War
- Awards: Army Distinguished Service Medal; Silver Star; Legion of Merit (3); Distinguished Flying Cross; Bronze Star Medal (2); Air Medal (3)

Homer Watson Kiefer (20 November 1898 – 22 September 1976) was a career officer in the United States Army. A veteran of World War I, World War II, and the Korean War, he served in the Ohio National Guard from 1917 to 1918 and in the army from 1920 to 1953. Kiefer attained the rank of major general, and his awards included the Army Distinguished Service Medal, Silver Star, Legion of Merit, Distinguished Flying Cross, Bronze Star Medal, and Air Medal. Kiefer's commands included the 9th Infantry Division, which he led from June 1952 until his July 1953 retirement.

== Early life ==
Homer W. Kiefer was born in Attica, Ohio on 20 November 1898, a son of Richard John Kiefer and Ida Sanford Kiefer. He was raised and educated in northwestern Ohio, including towns in Logan, Seneca, and Wyandot Counties, and was a 1917 graduate of Bellefontaine High School.

After graduating from high school, Kiefer attended Ohio Wesleyan University, where he joined the Phi Delta Theta fraternity. In July 1917, Kiefer joined the Ohio National Guard's 4th Field Hospital as a private. He continued to serve with the unit after it was federalized for World War I as the 147th Field Hospital, a unit of the 37th Division's 112th Sanitary Train. Kiefer continued to serve with this unit until May 1918, when he was discharged so he could begin attendance at the United States Military Academy.

Kiefer was serving at Camp Sheridan near Montgomery, Alabama in early 1918 when he was selected to undergo competitive examination for appointment to the United States Military Academy at West Point. He passed and in May he was discharged from the 147th Field Hospital so he could become an academy cadet. With classes accelerated due to the wartime need for officers, Kiefer attended West Point from June 1918 to July 1920, when he graduated ranked 100th of 271 and received his commission as a second lieutenant of Field Artillery. Among his classmates who went on to careers as general officers were Verne D. Mudge, Lyman Lemnitzer, Clovis E. Byers, Henry I. Hodes, Halley G. Maddox, Ewart G. Plank, John F. Cassidy, and Sidney Hinds.

== Start of career ==
After receiving his commission, Kiefer attended the Field Artillery Officer Basic Course at Fort Knox, Kentucky From September 1920 to August 1921. After graduating, he remained at the school as a member of the faculty. From August 1922 to June 1923, he served as an instructor for the Battery Officers' Course at the Fort Sill, Oklahoma Field Artillery School. As the army reduced its size after the First World War and then stabilized its personnel strength, Kiefer was promoted and reduced in rank several times; he was promoted to first lieutenant on the same day he received his commission in July 1920. In December 1922, he returned to the rank of second lieutenant.

From June 1923 to June 1926, Kiefer served with the 13th Field Artillery Regiment at Schofield Barracks, Hawaii. In June 1925, he was again promoted to first lieutenant. From June 1926 to September 1929, he was assigned to the 6th Field Artillery Regiment at Fort Hoyle, Maryland. From September 1929 to March 1931, he served on the staff of the 1st Infantry Division at Fort Hamilton, New York. In March 1931, he was assigned to duty with the Second Corps Area headquarters and the Organized Reserve Corps' 77th Infantry Division at Fort Jay, New York. From August 1931 to March 1934, Kiefer was assigned as aide-de-camp to Major General Lucius Roy Holbrook, the commander of the 1st Infantry Division.

=== Family ===
In 1922, Kiefer married Rosamund Burt, the daughter of Brigadier General Reynolds J. Burt (1874–1969). They were married until his death and were the parents of two children. Daughter Lilian (1929–2024) was the wife of Lieutenant General Thomas Tackaberry. Son Homer Jr. (1930–2025) graduated from West Point and retired from the army as a colonel.

== Continued career ==
From March 1934 to February 1935, Kiefer served as assistant plans, operations, and training officer (G-3) on the staff of the 3rd Infantry Division at Fort Lewis, Washington, in addition to serving as the post athletics officer on the garrison staff. Kiefer had played football at West Point, in addition to boxing and wrestling, and his duties at Fort Lewis included coaching football. He was also a polo player, and at Fort Lewis he refereed and coached, in addition to organizing and participating in horse shows. From February 1935 to October 1937, he served at Fort Sill as a member of the 18th Field Artillery Regiment and the staff of the Field Artillery School. He also took part in several polo matches, including membership on an army team that traveled to Mexico for an international tournament. He was promoted to captain in August 1935, and from October 1937 to September 1938 he commanded Battery B, 18th Field Artillery. During his battery command, his executive officer and second-in-command was William Westmoreland.

From September 1938 to May 1939, Kiefer attended the Air Corps Tactical School (ACTS) at Maxwell Field, Alabama, where captains and majors from ground branches including Field Artillery studied airpower strategy, tactics, and air-ground coordination alongside Air Corps counterparts. He was then assigned to Reserve Officers' Training Corps duty at Princeton University, where he served as assistant professor of military science until March 1941. He was promoted to major in March 1941. While at Princeton, Kiefer also coached the school's polo team. From April 1941 to January 1943, he served during World War II as executive officer, then commander, of 2nd Battalion, 11th Field Artillery Regiment. While in Hawaii, he also coached the regiment's football team and served as president of the Schofield Barracks Polo Association. He was promoted to temporary lieutenant colonel in December 1941.

== Later career ==
In January 1943, Kiefer was promoted to temporary colonel and assigned to the South West Pacific Area for Second World War duty as executive officer of the 24th Infantry Division Artillery. In June 1944, he was assigned as Field Artillery officer on the Sixth Army staff, and he continued to serve in the Pacific theater, including the New Guinea campaign and the Philippines campaign of 1944–1945. He was promoted to temporary brigadier general in March 1945 and served overseas until the end of the war in August 1945. He was then assigned to lead an advance party to Kyoto, where it planned for the arrival of the Sixth Army during the post-war Occupation of Japan.

Kiefer returned to the United States in February 1946 and was assigned to command of the War Department Personnel Center at Fort Lewis. In August 1946, he was assigned to duty in Chicago as assistant chief of staff for operations (G-3) on the Fifth Army staff. In February 1948, he was assigned to Fort Bragg, North Carolina as artillery officer on the staff of V Corps. In December 1948, he was assigned as V Corps chief of staff. Kiefer was assigned to Korean War duty in August 1950 as commander of the 7th Infantry Division Artillery. He took part in the September 1950 Battle of Inchon, and in December his artillery formed the defensive perimeter that enabled the Hungnam evacuation. In June 1952, he was assigned to command of the 9th Infantry Division at Fort Dix, New Jersey and in July he was promoted to temporary major general. He led the division until July 1953, when he retired.

In retirement, Kiefer resided in Asheville, North Carolina. In the early 1960s, he moved to Clearwater, Florida. He died in Clearwater on 22 September 1976. He was buried at Arlington National Cemetery.

== Awards ==
Among Kiefer's awards and decorations were:

- Army Distinguished Service Medal
- Silver Star
- Legion of Merit with two oak leaf clusters
- Distinguished Flying Cross
- Bronze Star Medal with oak leaf cluster
- Air Medal with two oak leaf clusters

=== Distinguished Service Medal citation ===
He distinguished himself in the Southwest Pacific Area from June 1944 to September 1945 as Artillery Officer, Headquarters Sixth Army. He planned and coordinated the employment of artillery during operations in the Philippines and directed his troops in the mountain and jungle fighting.

Service: United States Army Rank: Brigadier General Division: 6th Army Action Date: 1943–1945 Orders: War Department, General Orders No. 15 (1946)

== Dates of rank ==
Kiefer's dates of ranks included:

- Private, Ohio National Guard, 16 July 1917 to 23 May 1918
- Cadet, United States Military Academy, 14 June 1918 to 1 July 1920
- Second Lieutenant (National Army), 2 July 1920
- First Lieutenant (National Army), 2 July 1920
- Second Lieutenant, 15 December 1922
- First Lieutenant, 25 June 1925
- Captain, 1 August 1935
- Major, 1 July 1940
- Lieutenant Colonel (Army of the United States), 11 December 1941
- Lieutenant Colonel, 2 July 1943
- Colonel, (Army of the United States), 14 January 1943
- Colonel, 11 March 1948
- Brigadier General (Army of the United States), 26 March 1945
- Major General (Army of the United States), 4 July 1952
- Major General (Retired), 31 July 1953
