= Franciszek Brożek =

Polish sport shooter (1890–1940)

Personal information
- Born: 23 August 1890 Kraków, Austria-Hungary
- Died: 1940 (aged 49–50) Kharkiv, Ukrainian SSR, Soviet Union

Sport
- Sport: Sport shooting

Franciszek Brożek (23 August 1890 – 1940) was a Polish sport shooter. He competed in the team free rifle event at the 1924 Summer Olympics. He was captured by the Soviets during World War II and shot in the NKVD buildings in Kharkiv in the spring of 1940.
