= George Church =

George Church may refer to:

- George Church (sport shooter) (1889–1951), South African sports shooter
- George Church (tennis) (1891–1946), American tennis player
- George Church (priest), Archdeacon of Malta, 1971–1975
- George Church (geneticist) (born 1954), American molecular geneticist
- George Earl Church (1835–1910), American civil engineer and geographer
- George W. Church Sr. (1903–1956), American businessman, founder of Church's Chicken

== See also ==
- St George's Church (disambiguation)
