= L'union Suite =

Haitian-American entertainment media company

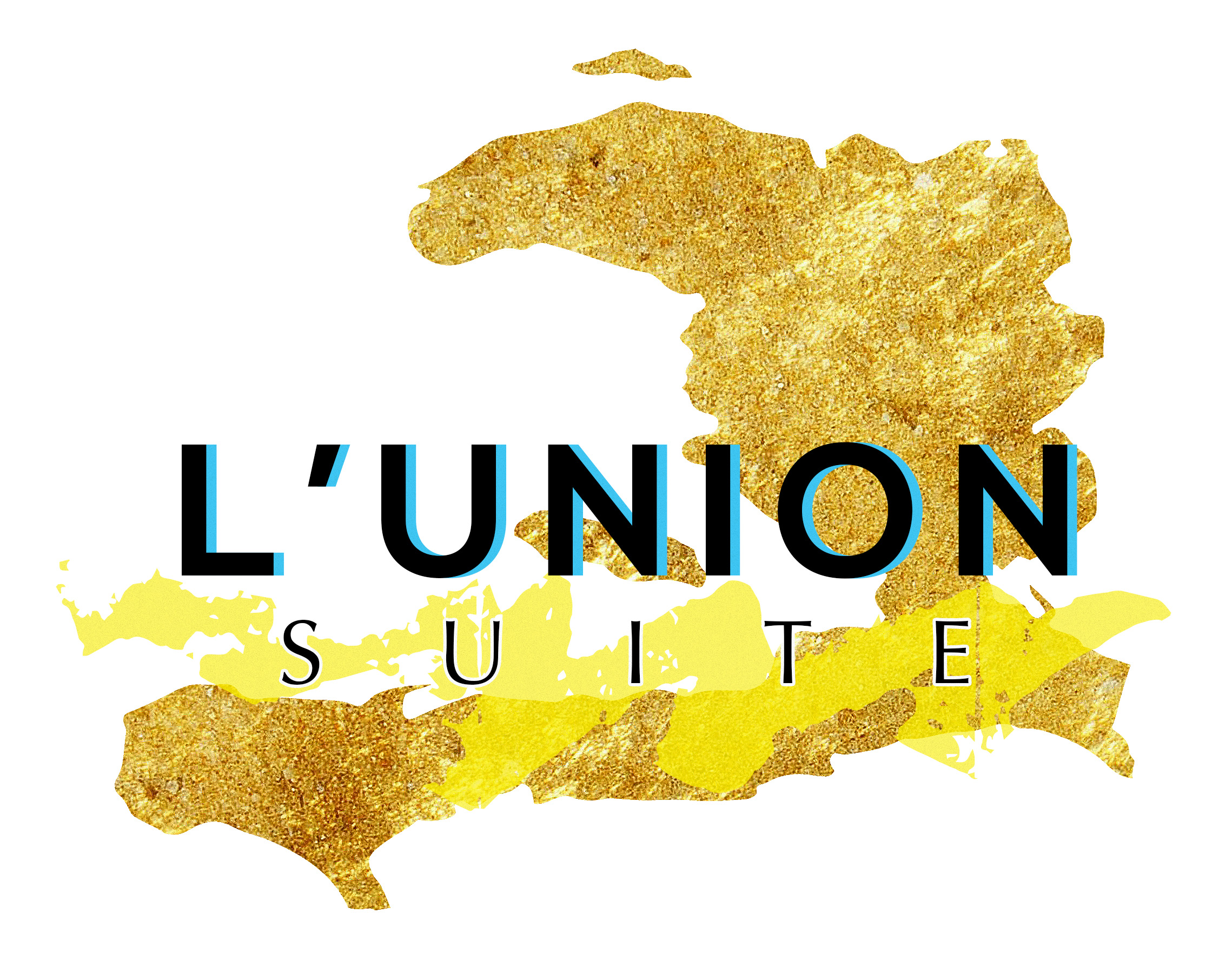
- Website type: Media
- Available in: English
- No. of locations: Sunrise, Florida
- Founder: Whenda “Wanda” Tima
- Website: www.lunionsuite.com
- Launched: October 19, 2011; 14 years ago (First post)
- Current status: Active

L'union Suite is a Haitian-American lifestyle, tourism, culture, society, and entertainment media company based in South Florida.

== History ==
Started as a small blog, L'union Suite was created by Whenda "Wanda" Tima-Gilles (born in Cap-Haïtien and residing in Florida) to provide a platform to connect with other Haitian-Americans who felt disconnected from Haitian culture as she did. L'union Suite highlights positive and uplifting stories about Haiti and its diaspora.

In 2017, L'union Suite closely followed and informed on Haiti's exit of the USA's Temporary protected status (TPS).

== Charitable works ==
Each year L’union Suite adopts a new project to fundraise by hosting annual events, most notably the ”Strike for Education” bowling tournament where celebrities, influencers and South Florida residents have turned out for.

On 30 April 2018, L’union Suite opened a computer lab, which also included school supplies and new blackboards in Collège Bell Angelot in Cap-Haïtien, Haiti for students between 7th and 12th grades in order for them to take full advantage of S.T.E.M., which is a term aimed to further academic disciplines in science, technology, engineering, and mathematics through focused lab. Contributions were raised from an annual fundraiser hosted by L’union Suite which included support from the likes of Pierre Garçon and Spirit Airlines to name a few.
