= Joseph Crockett =

American sport shooter (1905–2001)

Personal information
- Born: February 16, 1905 Washington, D. C., United States
- Died: July 11, 2001 (aged 96) Englewood, Colorado, United States

Sport
- Sport: Sports shooting
Medal record
Men's shooting
Representing United States
Olympic Games
Gold medal – first place	1924 Paris	Team free rifle

Joseph William Crockett (February 16, 1905 – July 11, 2001) was an American sport shooter who competed in the 1924 Summer Olympics. He was born in Washington, D.C., and died in Englewood, Colorado. In 1924 he won the gold medal as member of the American team in the team free rifle competition.
