= Josef Kozlík =

Czech sport shooter

Personal information
- Born: 1883

Sport
- Sport: Sport shooting

Josef Kozlík (1883–?) was a Czech sport shooter. He competed in the team free rifle event at the 1924 Summer Olympics.
