= Douglas C. McDougal =

United States Marine Corps general

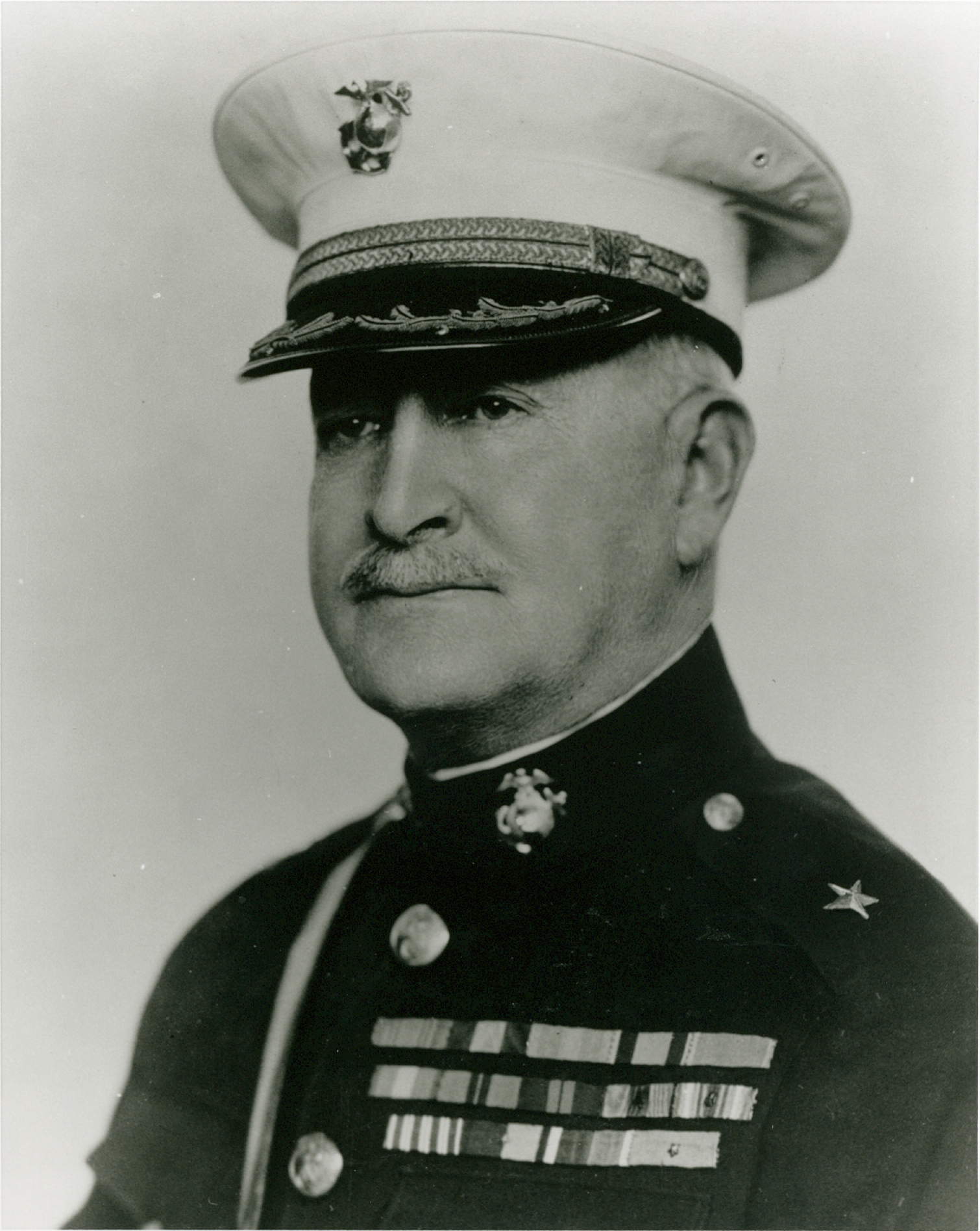
- Born: April 23, 1876; San Francisco, California, U.S.
- Died: January 20, 1964 (aged 87)
- Military career
- Allegiance: United States
- Branch: United States Navy; United States Revenue Cutter Service; United States Marine Corps
- Service years: 1898–1899; 1900–1940
- Rank: Major General
- Commands: Assistant Commandant of the Marine Corps; Fleet Marine Force, San Diego; National Guard of Nicaragua; Gendarmerie of Haiti
- Conflicts: Spanish–American War; Philippine–American War; Boxer Rebellion; Mexican Revolution; Battle of Veracruz; U.S. occupation of the Dominican Republic; World War I; U.S. occupation of Haiti; U.S. occupation of Nicaragua

Douglas C. McDougal (April 23, 1876 – January 20, 1964) was an American major general who served as the tenth assistant commandant of the Marine Corps from 1934 to 1935 and as the second commander of the Fleet Marine Force from 1935 to 1937. He also commanded the Haitian Gendarmerie from 1921 to 1925, and the Nicaraguan National Guard from 1929 to 1931.

== Early years ==
Douglas C. McDougal was born 23 April 1876, in San Francisco, California, and was a resident of Mare Island, California. He was appointed a Naval Cadet 19 May 1893, and resigned 16 June 1894. On the outbreak of the Spanish-American War in April 1898, he enlisted in the Navy, was appointed an Ensign the following month and served in the latter capacity until October 1898, when he was honorably discharged. During the Spanish-American War, he served on the USS St. Paul while that vessel was engaged in scouting for and locating the Spanish fleet at Santiago, Cuba, and later on the USS Hist and USS Marblehead, participating in the Cuban blockade and in an engagement with shore batteries at Manzanillo.

In October 1898, he was appointed a Cadet, U.S. Revenue Cutter Service, but resigned in June 1899, to prepare for his examination for appointment as a second lieutenant in the Marine Corps. He was appointed a second lieutenant, 12 March 1900; was promoted first lieutenant, 14 October 1903; captain, 23 January 1908; major, 26 April 1917; lieutenant colonel (temporary), 1 July 1918; lieutenant colonel, 4 June 1920; colonel, 1 October 1926; brigadier general, 1 March 1934; and major general, 1 October 1939.

== Marine Corps service ==
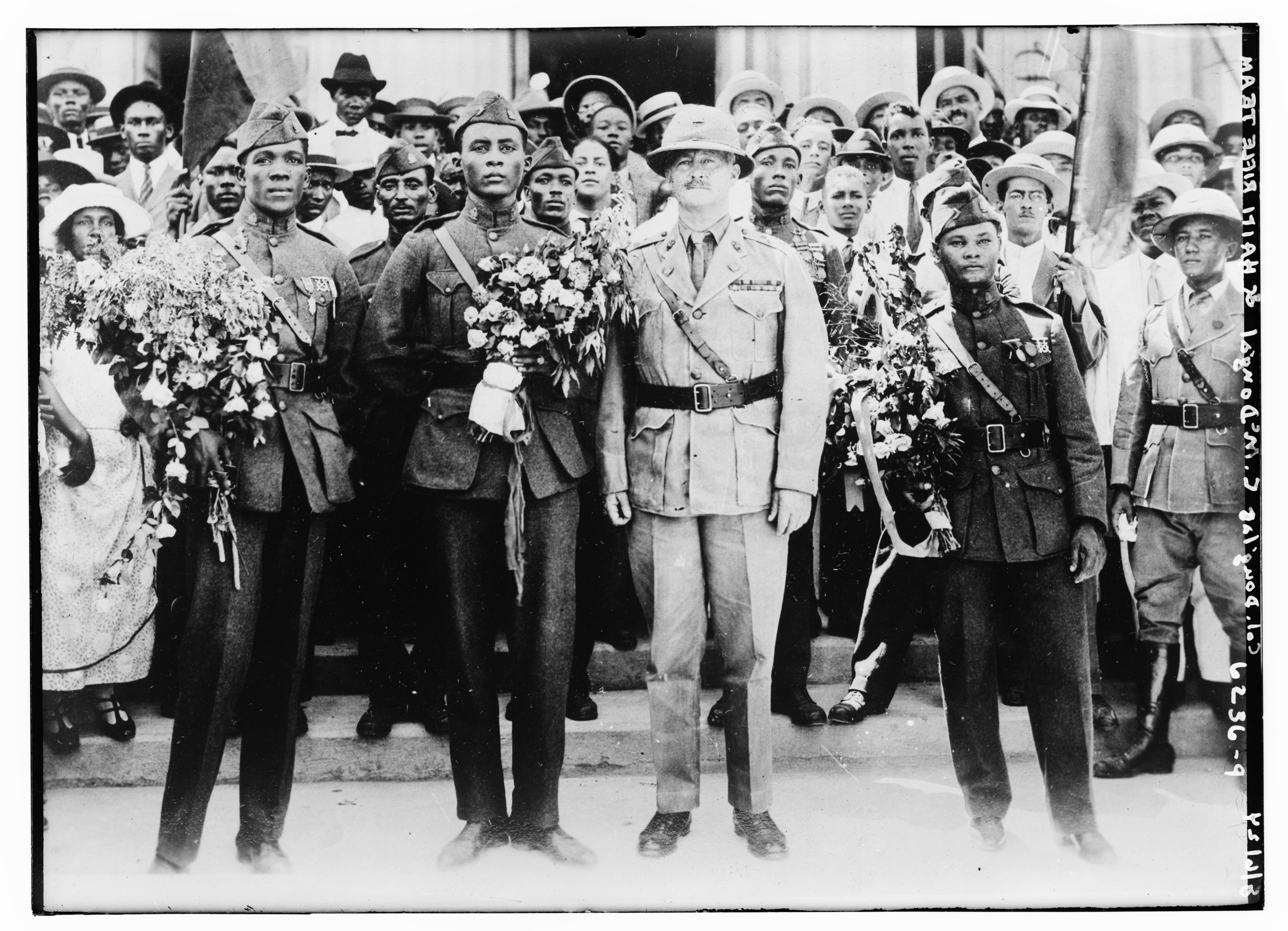
Col. McDougal with the Haitian gendarmerie rifle team that took bronze in the 1924 Summer Olympics

As a lieutenant, he served in the Far East for almost four years (1900-1904), in the Philippine Islands, China, and Korea. He participated in operations incident to the Boxer Rebellion, and commanded the Legation Guard at Seoul, Korea. From 1906 to 1909, he commanded the Marine Detachment, USS Colorado, and was then ordered to Headquarters Marine Corps where he served until the early part of 1911. His principal duty while at Headquarters was an instructor in rifle marksmanship, and he was captain of the first Marine Corps Rifle Team to win the National Match.

He attended the Naval War College during the school year 1913-1914, but before the course was completed, he was detached for expeditionary service in Mexico. He participated in the occupation of Vera Cruz in April 1914. In 1915 and 1916, he participated in operations in the field in Haiti, and also served in Santo Domingo in 1916.

From August 1917 to July 1918, he was assigned to Headquarters Marine Corps as Inspector of Target Practice. In July 1918, he was ordered to Quantico, Virginia, for duty with the 13th Regiment, and in September of that year sailed for France, as second in command. He returned to the United States in August 1919, and from September 1919 to January 1921, was in charge of ordnance material at the Depot of Supplies, Philadelphia, Pennsylvania.

From April 1921 to April 1925, General McDougal served as Chief of the Gendarmerie d'Haiti. In recognition of his services, the President of Haiti conferred upon him the Haitian Distinguished Service Medal. Following his return from Haiti, and until February 1929, he was in charge of War Plans Section, Headquarters Marine Corps, and during the period (in 1928) he was captain of the American International Rifle Team which competed at Rotterdam. Also, during the period (in 1926), he was appointed Aide to the President of Haiti during the latter's visit to Washington, and received the Haitian Medal of Honor and Merit for his contribution to the success of the mission.

From March 1929 to January 1931, General McDougal was Director-in-Chief of the Guardia Nacional de Nicaragua, and for his outstanding services was awarded the Distinguished Service Medal by the President of the United States, and the Medal of Distinction and Medal of Merit by the President of Nicaragua.

From May 1931 to April 1934, General McDougal served at Headquarters Marine Corps as Director of Operations and Training, and from April 1934 to April 1935, as Assistant to the Major General Commandant. In May 1935, he joined the Marine Corps Base, San Diego, California, as Commanding General, and in September of the same year was assigned the additional duty of Commanding General, Fleet Marine Force, in which capacity he served until May 1937, when ordered to the Marine Barracks, Parris Island, South Carolina, where he served as Commanding General, and acted as State Administrator of the Works Progress Administration.

== Later life ==
He completed his tour at Parris Island in the late summer of 1939 and was slated to assume command of the Department of the Pacific in the fall. Before the latter assignment came to pass, however, General McDougal was recommended for retirement by reason of physical disability. He retired on 1 January 1940 with the rank of Major General. General McDougal died on 20 January 1964.

== Awards and decorations ==
Haiti

- Haitian Distinguished Service Medal
- Medal of Honor and Merit

Nicaragua

- Medal of Distinction
- Medal of Merit

United States

- Navy Distinguished Service Medal
- Spanish Campaign Medal
- Philippine Campaign Medal
- China Campaign Medal
- World War I Victory Medal
- Marine Corps Expeditionary Medal
- Dominican Campaign Medal
- Haitian Campaign Medal
- Nicaraguan Campaign Medal

Military offices
| Preceded by John H. Russell Jr. | Assistant Commandant of the Marine Corps; 1934–1935 | Succeeded by Louis M. Little |
| Preceded by Charles H. Lyman II | Commanding General of the Fleet Marine Force; 1935–1937 | Succeeded by Louis M. Little |
