= Pierre Hardy (athlete) =

French sport shooter

Personal information
- Born: 4 August 1907 Paris, France
- Died: 24 July 2000 (aged 92) Poissy, France

Sport
- Sport: Sports shooting
Medal record
Men's shooting
Representing France
Olympic Games
Silver medal – second place	1924 Paris	Team free rifle

Pierre Hardy (4 August 1907 – 24 July 2000) was a French sport shooter. He was born in Paris. He competed at the 1924 Summer Olympics, where he won a silver medal in the team contest.
