= Hendrik de Grijff =

Dutch sports shooter

Personal information
- Born: 22 September 1892 Zutphen, Netherlands
- Died: 11 December 1976 (aged 84) The Hague, Netherlands

Sport
- Sport: Sports shooting

Hendrik de Grijff (22 September 1892 – 11 December 1976) was a Dutch sports shooter. He competed in the 600 m free rifle event at the 1924 Summer Olympics.
