= Mihai Plătăreanu =

Romanian sports shooter

Personal information
- Born: 1898

Sport
- Sport: Sports shooting

Mihai Plătăreanu (born 1898, date of death unknown) was a Romanian sports shooter. He competed in the team free rifle event at the 1924 Summer Olympics.
