= François Kortleven =

Dutch sports shooter

Personal information
- Born: 13 February 1884 Oisterwijk, Netherlands
- Died: 31 January 1969 (aged 84) Bergen op Zoom, Netherlands

Sport
- Sport: Sports shooting

François Kortleven (13 February 1884 – 31 January 1969) was a Dutch sports shooter. He competed in the team free rifle event at the 1924 Summer Olympics.
