= Georgios Anitsas =

Greek sports shooter

Personal information
- Born: 1891 Volos, Greece
- Died: Unknown

Sport
- Sport: Sports shooting

Georgios Anitsas (born 1891, date of death unknown) was a Greek sports shooter. He competed in the team free rifle event at the 1924 Summer Olympics.
