= Johannes Scheuter =

Dutch sports shooter

Personal information
- Born: 8 November 1880 Amersfoort, Netherlands
- Died: 7 August 1944 (aged 63) Apeldoorn, Netherlands

Sport
- Sport: Sports shooting

Johannes Scheuter (8 November 1880 – 7 August 1944) was a Dutch sports shooter. He competed in the 600 m free rifle event at the 1924 Summer Olympics.
