= Gerrit Bouwhuis =

Dutch sports shooter

Personal information
- Born: 27 May 1888 Ommen, Netherlands
- Died: 23 March 1957 (aged 68) Arnhem, Netherlands

Sport
- Sport: Sports shooting

Gerrit Bouwhuis (27 May 1888 – 23 March 1957) was a Dutch sports shooter. He competed in the team free rifle event at the 1924 Summer Olympics.
