= Adrianus van Korlaar =

Dutch sports shooter

Personal information
- Born: 26 June 1882 Kerkdriel, Netherlands
- Died: 12 May 1956 (aged 73) The Hague, Netherlands

Sport
- Sport: Sports shooting

Adrianus van Korlaar (26 June 1882 – 12 May 1956) was a Dutch sports shooter. He competed in the team free rifle event at the 1924 Summer Olympics.
