= Ivar Wester =

Swedish sports shooter

Personal information
- Born: 16 December 1892 Hudiksvall, Sweden
- Died: 13 September 1967 (aged 74) Stockholm, Sweden

Sport
- Sport: Sports shooting

Ivar Wester (16 December 1892 – 13 September 1967) was a Swedish sports shooter. He competed in the team free rifle event at the 1924 Summer Olympics.
