= Thomas Tackaberry =

United States Army general

Thomas Howard Tackaberry
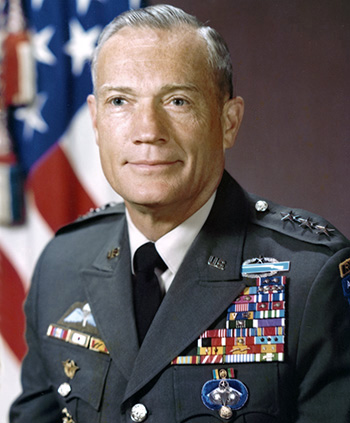
- LTG. Thomas H. Tackaberry
- Born: September 6, 1923; Los Angeles, California
- Died: April 3, 2017 (aged 93); Fayetteville, North Carolina
- Burial place: Arlington National Cemetery
- Military career
- Allegiance: United States
- Branch: United States Army
- Service years: 1942–1981
- Rank: Lieutenant General
- Nickname: Tom
- Commands: XVIII Airborne Corps; 82nd Airborne Division; 196th Infantry Brigade; 2nd Battalion, 8th Cavalry Regiment, 1st Cavalry Division
- Conflicts: World War II; Korean War; Vietnam War
- Awards: Distinguished Service Cross (3); Defense Distinguished Service Medal; Army Distinguished Service Medal; Silver Star (5); Legion of Merit (3); Distinguished Flying Cross; Soldier's Medal; Bronze Star (3); Purple Heart; Air Medal (52)

Thomas Howard Tackaberry (September 6, 1923 – April 3, 2017) was a lieutenant general in the United States Army. He was a veteran of World War II, the Korean War and the Vietnam War and was a recipient of three Distinguished Service Crosses and served as commander of the XVIII Airborne Corps from 1979 to 1981. "Described as a 'grunt's angel', Lt. Gen. Tackaberry was devoted to his men, not only ensuring they were always supplied for the fight but physically prepared as well. Leading from the front, Lt. Gen. Tackaberry set a high bar for fitness with his men and led them on long training runs", stated Richard Hudson to the 115th congressional session on May 19, 2017.

== Korean War ==
In 1952, while serving as a company commander, Tackaberry earned the Distinguished Service Cross for heroism near Chorwon, Korea when he voluntarily went to relieve a patrol which had lost its commander. Tackaberry directed the soldiers back toward their own lines and personally covered their retreat at the risk of his own life. He also received two Silver Stars for his service in Korea.

== Vietnam War ==
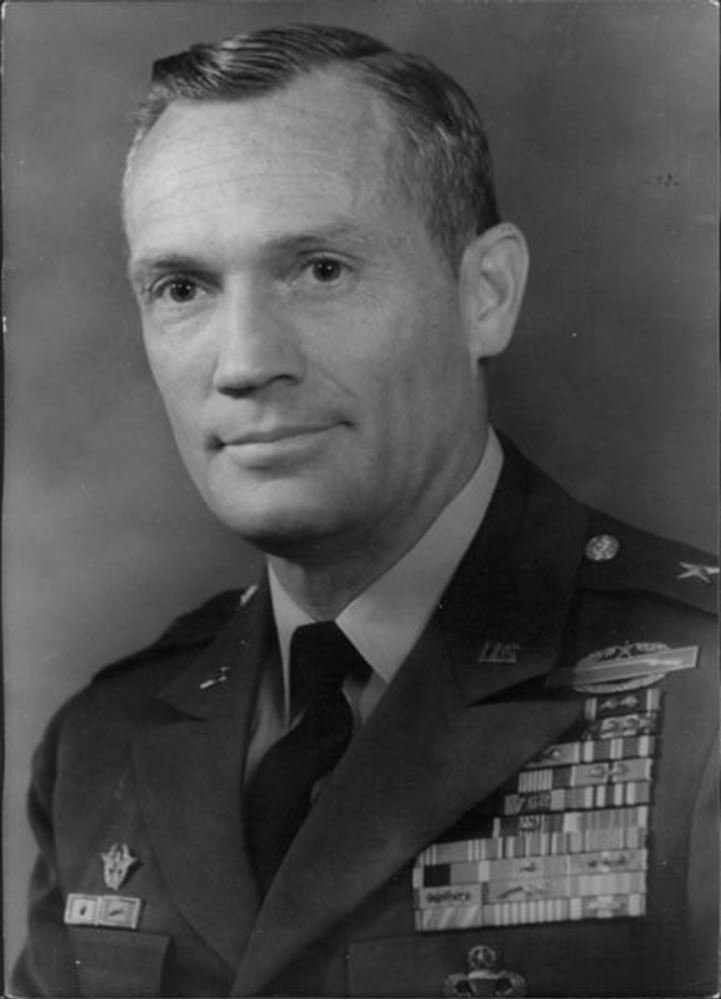
LTG Tackaberry

In 1966 Tackaberry was serving in Vietnam as a lieutenant colonel and earned an oak leaf cluster to his Distinguished Service Cross for heroism near Bồng Sơn, South Vietnam, when he led a search and destroy operation in which a 15-man platoon was pinned down and its leader killed. He then ordered his unarmed command helicopter to land near the firefight and ran through intense enemy fire to reach the platoon and assume command. When reinforcements arrived, he led an assault on enemy bunkers, forcing the larger North Vietnamese force to retreat.

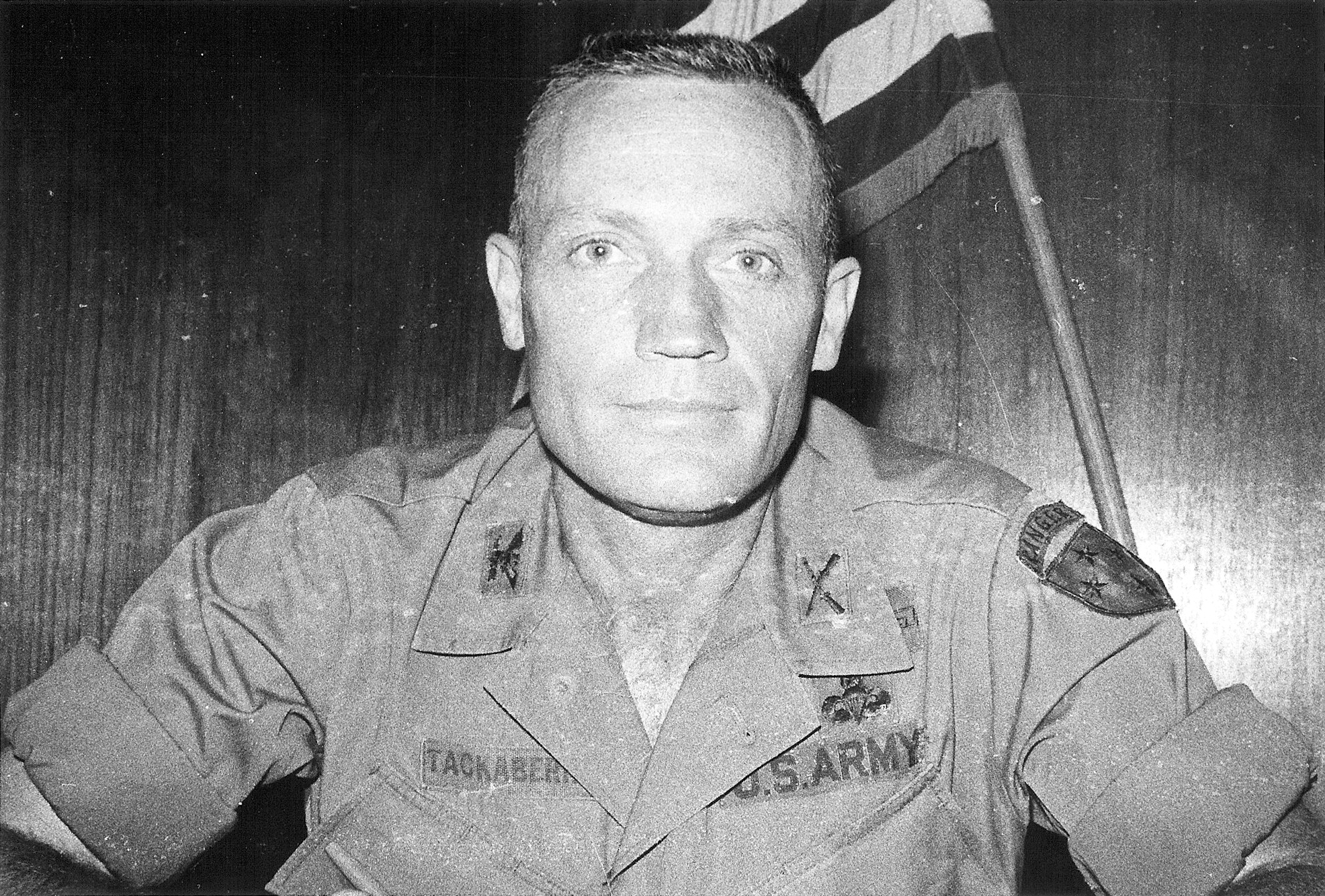
Col. Thomas Tackaberry the brigade commander of the 196th Infantry Brigade.

In 1969, he had been promoted to colonel and was the brigade commander of the 196th Infantry Brigade when he earned a second oak leaf cluster to his Distinguished Service Cross, making him one of the few individuals who had earned three or more Distinguished Service Crosses. Tackaberry also received three more Silver Stars for his service in Vietnam. He then served as chief of staff of the 23rd Infantry Division.

== Later life ==
Tackaberry was married to Lilian Kiefer, the daughter of Major General Homer W. Kiefer. They were the parents of six children. Their twin sons, Burt and Kief Tackaberry, served as officers in the army. His eldest grandson, Lieutenant Colonel Andrew S. Tackaberry took command of the 6th Battalion, 37th Field Artillery Regiment from June 2015 to 2017. Another grandson, Lieutenant Colonel Jonathan P. Tackaberry took command of 1st Squadron, 17th Cavalry Regiment in May 2017.[

Tackaberry retired from military service after 38 years. He then transitioned to managing a real estate business and counseling in the military of the Republic of China for BDC Corp. Tackaberry remained dedicated to fitness all his life to include at the age of 93 years old and confined to a wheel chair. After being challenged by a family member he completed 10 push-ups on his feet.

Tackaberry died on April 3, 2017. He was predeceased by his son Richard and daughter Elizabeth. He is buried with full military honors at Arlington National Cemetery on August 23, 2017.

== Awards and decorations ==
His military awards include:

Combat Infantryman Badge (2nd Award)
Master Parachutist Badge
Distinguished Service Cross with 2 bronze oak leaf clusters
Defense Distinguished Service Medal	Army Distinguished Service Medal	Silver Star with 4 bronze oak leaf clusters
Legion of Merit with 2 bronze oak leaf clusters	Distinguished Flying Cross	Soldier's Medal
Bronze Star with 2 bronze oak leaf clusters	Purple Heart	Air Medal with Combat V and Award numerals 52
Joint Service Commendation Medal	Army Commendation Medal with 1 bronze oak leaf cluster	Army Good Conduct Medal
American Campaign Medal	World War II Victory Medal	Army of Occupation Medal
National Defense Service Medal with 1 bronze service star	Korean Service Medal with 3 bronze campaign stars	Vietnam Service Medal with 1 silver and 1 bronze campaign stars
Army Service Ribbon	Army Overseas Service Ribbon with Award numeral 7	Vietnam Cross of Gallantry with 2 Palms
Vietnam Cross of Gallantry with 2 Silver Stars	Vietnam Armed Forces Honor Medal (1st Class)	Vietnam Staff Service Medal (1st Class)
United Nations Korea Medal	Vietnam Campaign Medal	Republic of Korea War Service Medal

Valorous Unit Award with 1 bronze oak leaf cluster	Republic of Korea Presidential Unit Citation	Republic of Vietnam Gallantry Cross Unit Citation with Palm
