= Henry Douglas (sport shooter) =

British sports shooter

Personal information
- Born: 17 July 1882 Matlock, Derbyshire, England
- Died: 30 December 1954 (aged 72) Matlock, Derbyshire, England

Sport
- Sport: Sports shooting

Henry Douglas (17 July 1882 – 30 December 1954) was a British sports shooter. He competed in the 600 m free rifle event at the 1924 Summer Olympics.
