= Ernest Sutherland =

New Zealand-South African decathlete and javelin thrower

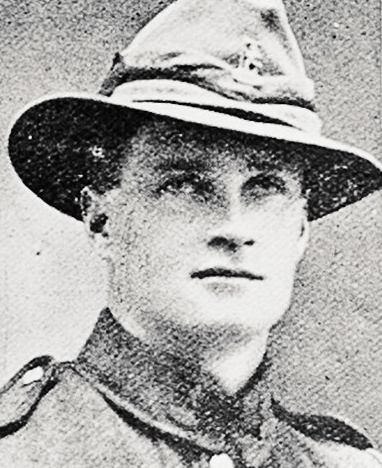
- Sutherland during World War I

Personal information
- Born: 26 April 1894; Palmerston North, New Zealand
- Died: 8 July 1936 (aged 42); Palmerston North, New Zealand
- Occupation: Police officer
- Height: 1.83 m (6 ft 0 in)
- Weight: 74 kg (164 lb)

Sport
- Sport: Track and field
- Event(s): Decathlon, shot put, high jump, javelin throw, long jump, pole vault, triple jump

Achievements and titles
- National finals: High jump champion (1920, 1921); Javelin throw champion (1921, 1922); Long jump champion (1920, 1922, 1927, 1928); Pole vault champion (1929); Shot put champion (1927); Triple jump champion (1915, 1920)

Ernest George Sutherland (26 April 1894 – 8 July 1936), also known as Buz Sutherland, was a New Zealand athlete. Well known in his home country, he stayed in South Africa in 1922 after touring with a New Zealand team. He competed for South Africa at the 1924 Summer Olympics in Paris and came fifth in the decathlon. He returned to New Zealand in 1926.

Born in Palmerston North on 26 April 1894, Sutherland was the son of Jessie and William Sutherland. In May 1915, he enlisted in the New Zealand Expeditionary Force, serving overseas for three years and six months as a rifleman in the New Zealand Rifle Brigade, 1st Battalion, and seeing active service in North Africa and France. He was wounded in action, suffering a severe gunshot wound to his left thigh, at Bir Shola in January 1916 during the Senussi campaign.

In all, Sutherland won 12 New Zealand national athletic championship titles across six field disciplines. His only title before leaving to fight in World War I was in the triple jump in 1915, his other 11 titles coming after the war. These were in: the triple jump in 1920; the high jump in 1920 and 1921; the long jump in 1920, 1922, 1927, and 1928; the javelin throw in 1921 and 1922; the shot put in 1927; and finally the pole vault in 1929.

Sutherland was a policeman. He had a fatal fall from his bicycle on 8 July 1936 in Palmerston North when his shoulder strap became entangled with his knee and handlebars. He went head-first over his handlebar and broke his neck.
