= Leslie Laing (sport shooter) =

South African sports shooter

Personal information
- Born: 29 August 1873
- Died: 6 July 1933 (aged 59)

Sport
- Sport: Sports shooting

Leslie Laing (29 August 1873 – 6 July 1933) was a South African sports shooter. He competed in the team free rifle event at the 1924 Summer Olympics.
