= Édouard Armand =

Haitian sprinter

Personal information
- Nationality: Haitian
- Born: August 1890
- Died: Unknown

Sport
- Sport: Sprinting
- Event: 400 metres

Édouard Armand (born August 1890, date of death unknown) was a Haitian sprinter. He competed in the men's 400 metres at the 1924 Summer Olympics.
