= C. Dupre =

Haitian sport shooter

Olympic medal record

Representing Haiti

Shooting
Bronze medal – third place	1924 Paris	Team free rifle

C. Dupre was an Olympic sport shooter who was part of the team that won Haiti's first ever Olympic medal, a bronze in team free rifle at the 1924 Summer Olympics. But C. Dupre did not start.
