= John Stiray =

South African sports shooter

Sport
- Sport: Sports shooting

John Stiray was a South African sports shooter. He competed in the 600 m free rifle event at the 1924 Summer Olympics.
