= Melville Wallace =

South African sports shooter

Personal information
- Born: 22 December 1887 Grahamstown, Cape Colony
- Died: 1 September 1943 (aged 55)

Sport
- Sport: Sports shooting

Melville Wallace (22 December 1887 – 1 September 1943) was a South African sports shooter. He competed in the team free rifle event at the 1924 Summer Olympics.
