= NKVD buildings =

NKVD buildings in former Soviet Union - during the first years of the Soviet Union the NKVD took over a number of existing buildings, many building were also constructed for offices and investigation/torture chambers and internal prisons.

== Russia ==
=== Moscow ===
- Lubyanka (KGB), formerly All-Russia Insurance Company, rebuild 1940 and 1983

=== Saint Petersburg ===
- Bolshoi Dom at Liteynyi Prospect

=== Vladivostok ===
- Far Eastern National University Main Building, NKVD 1939-1956

== Kyiv, Ukraine ==
- now the Cabinet of Ministers of Ukraine
- October Palace of Culture, originally a "Seminary for Young ladies"

== Minsk, Belarus ==
- now KGB building, constructed after the war, see

== Baku, Azerbaijan ==
- now the State Frontier Service
