= Clifford Davis (athlete) =

South African athlete

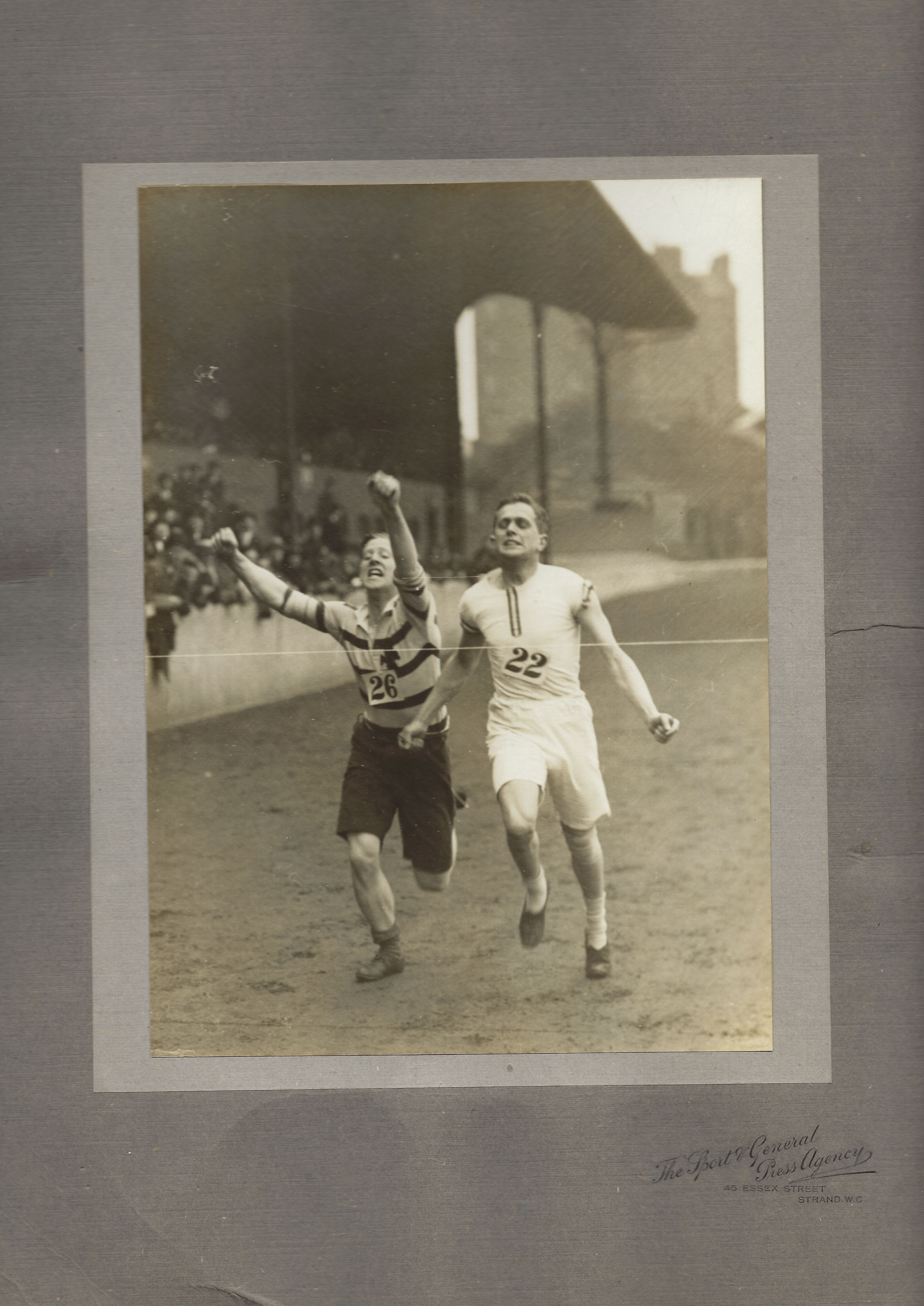

Personal information
- Nationality: South African
- Born: 23 April 1900 Cape Town, South Africa
- Died: 19 October 1974 (aged 74) London, England
- Height: 172 cm (5 ft 8 in)

Sport
- Sport: Track and field athletics
- Events: 800m and 1500m
- Club: University of Cambridge AC; Achilles Club

Clifford Eleazar Davis (23 April 1900 – 19 October 1974) was a track and field athlete who competed at the 1924 Summer Olympics.

== Biography ==
Davis was born in Cape Town, South Africa but studied at St Paul's School, London and Christ's College, Cambridge.

At the 1924 Olympic Games in Paris he competed in the 800m and 1500m events.
