= Halvard Angaard =

Norwegian sport shooter (1898–1967)

Personal information
- Born: 27 October 1898 Nordre Land, Norway
- Died: 10 June 1967 (aged 68) Oslo, Norway

Sport
- Sport: Sports shooting

Halvard Angaard (27 October 1898 – 10 June 1967) was a Norwegian sport shooter. He was born in Kristiania and represented the club Oslo Østre Skytterlag. He competed at the 1924 Summer Olympics, where he placed 8th in the team contest.
