= L. H. Clermont =

Olympic medal record

Representing Haiti

Shooting
Bronze medal – third place	1924 Paris	Team free rifle

L. H. Clermont was an Olympic sport shooter who was part of the team which won Haiti's first ever Olympic medal, a bronze in team free rifle at the 1924 Summer Olympics. But L. H. Clermont did not start.
