= James Trembath =

South African sports shooter

Personal information
- Born: 15 March 1871 Ludgvan, Cornwall, England
- Died: 2 April 1942 (aged 71) Penzance, Cornwall, England

Sport
- Sport: Sports shooting

James Trembath (15 March 1871 – 2 April 1942) was a South African sports shooter. He competed in the 600 m free rifle event at the 1924 Summer Olympics.
