= Olaf Johannessen (sport shooter) =

Norwegian sports shooter (1890–1977)

Personal information
- Born: 14 May 1890 Hamar, Norway
- Died: 15 November 1977 (aged 87) Hamar, Norway

Sport
- Sport: Sports shooting

Olaf Johannessen (14 May 1890 – 15 November 1977) was a Norwegian shooter who competed in the early 20th century in rifle shooting. He was born and died in Hamar. At the 1924 Summer Olympics he finished eighth in the free rifle team event, and also competed in the 600 metre free rifle and the 50 metre rifle, prone events.

Johannessen lived his entire life in Hamar, and died there on November 15, 1977.
