= Thomas Northcote (sport shooter) =

British sports shooter

Personal information
- Born: 30 November 1893 Salford, Greater Manchester, England
- Died: November 1991 Taunton, Somerset, England

Sport
- Sport: Sports shooting

Thomas Northcote (30 November 1893 – November 1991) was a British sports shooter. He competed in the 600 m free rifle event at the 1924 Summer Olympics.
