= Thomas Northcote (silversmith) =

British silversmith (1749–1798)

- Born: 1749
- Died: 1798
- Occupation: Silversmith

Thomas Northcote (1749–1798) was an 18th-century British silversmith.

He began learning his trade in June 1766 when he became an apprentice to Charles Hutton. However, he did not enter his first of ten solo marks until 1776. Between 1794 and 1797 he created silver plates in partnership with one George Bourne, but Northcote is also known for creating spoons and sugar tongs with intricate and - for the era - strange designs.
