= Harry Phillips (athlete) =

South African long-distance runner

Personal information
- Nationality: South African
- Born: 1890
- Died: Unknown

Sport
- Sport: Long-distance running
- Event: Marathon

Harry Phillips (born 1890, date of death unknown) was a South African long-distance runner. He competed in the marathon at the 1924 Summer Olympics.
