= John F. Cassidy =

American businessman

John F. Cassidy is a former chief executive officer and vice chairman of Cincinnati Bell Inc. He was installed as CEO in July 2003 and stepped down in February 2013. In 2013, Cincinnati Bell's board of directors awarded Jack Cassidy a $9 million cash bonus for his role in developing the a successful spin-off the company's data center business.
