= George Church (sport shooter) =

South African sports shooter

Personal information
- Born: 11 May 1890 Kimberley, Cape Colony
- Died: 18 March 1951 (aged 60) Springs, South Africa

Sport
- Sport: Sports shooting

George Church (11 May 1890 – 18 March 1951) was a South African sports shooter. He competed in the team free rifle event at the 1924 Summer Olympics.
