= Conrad Stucheli =

Swiss sports shooter

Personal information
- Born: 1892
- Died: Unknown

Sport
- Sport: Sports shooting

Conrad Stucheli (born 1892, date of death unknown) was a Swiss sports shooter. He competed in two events at the 1924 Summer Olympics.
