= Ludovic Augustin =

Haitian sport shooter

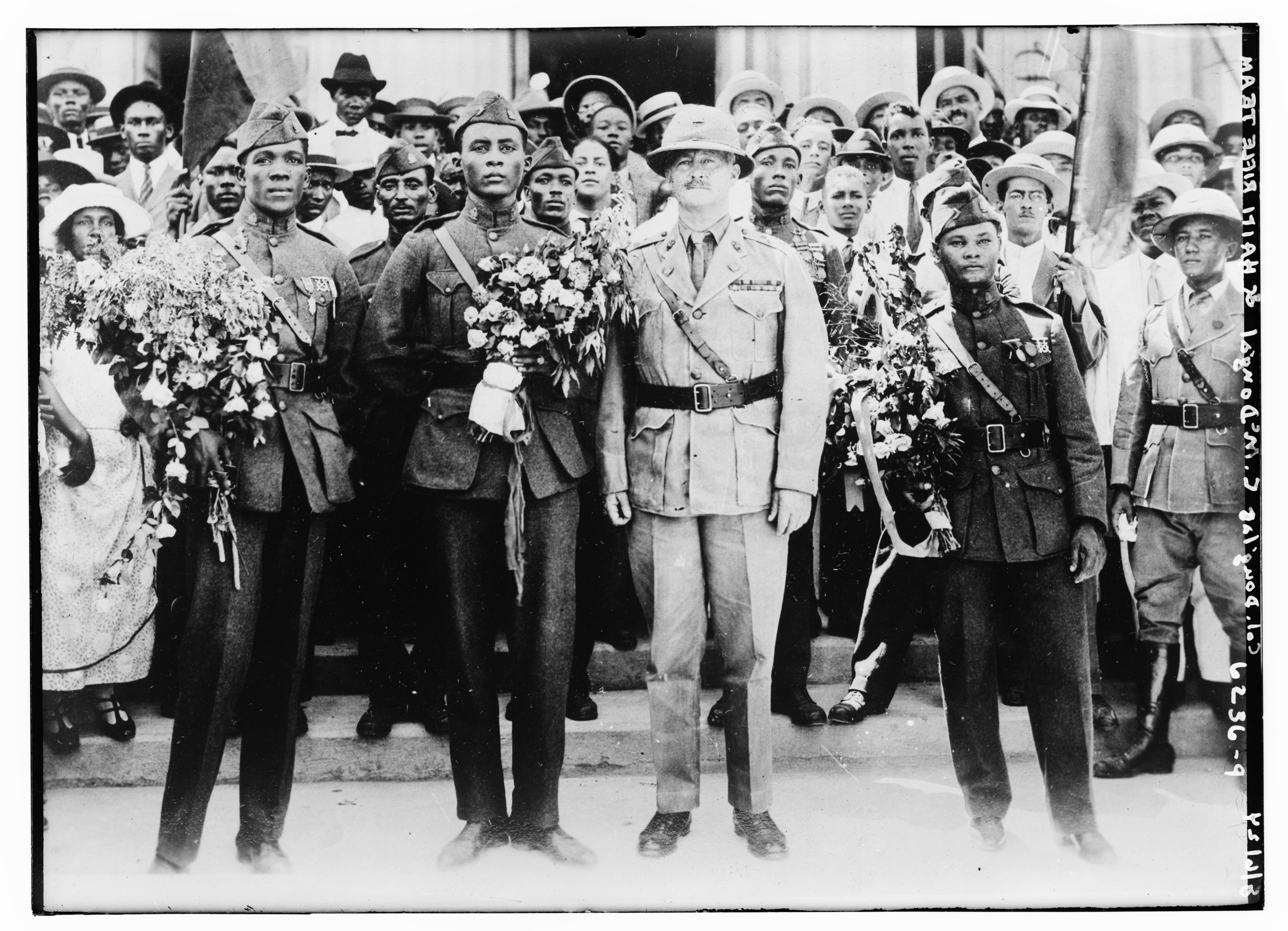

Personal information
- Nationality: Haitian
- Born: 1902
- Died: 25 August 1926 (aged 23–24)

Sport
- Sport: Sports shooting
Medal record
Men's shooting
Representing Haiti
Olympic Games
Bronze medal – third place	1924 Paris	Team free rifle

Ludovic C. Augustin (1902 – 25 August 1926) was an Olympic sport shooter who was part of the team that won Haiti's first ever Olympic medal—a bronze in team free rifle at the 1924 Summer Olympics.
