= Ludovic Valborge =

Haitian sport shooter

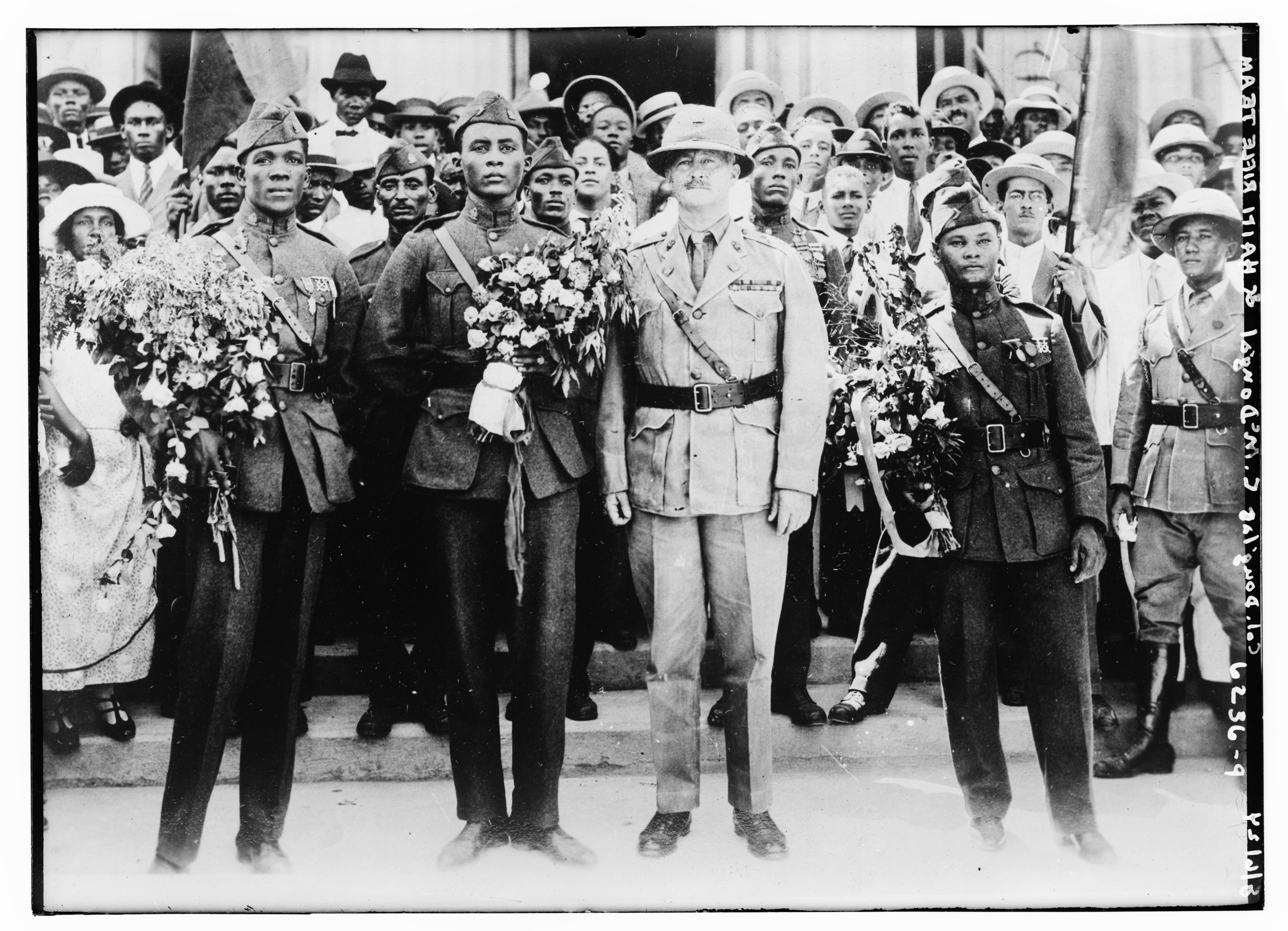

Personal information
- Nationality: Haitian
- Born: 1889
- Died: 1945 (aged 45–46)

Sport
- Sport: Sports shooting
Medal record
Men's shooting
Representing Haiti
Olympic Games
Bronze medal – third place	1924 Paris	Team free rifle

Ludovic Valborge (1889 – 1945) was an Olympic sport shooter who was part of the team won Haiti's first ever Olympic medal—a bronze in team free rifle at the 1924 Summer Olympics.
