= Destin Destine =

Haitian sport shooter

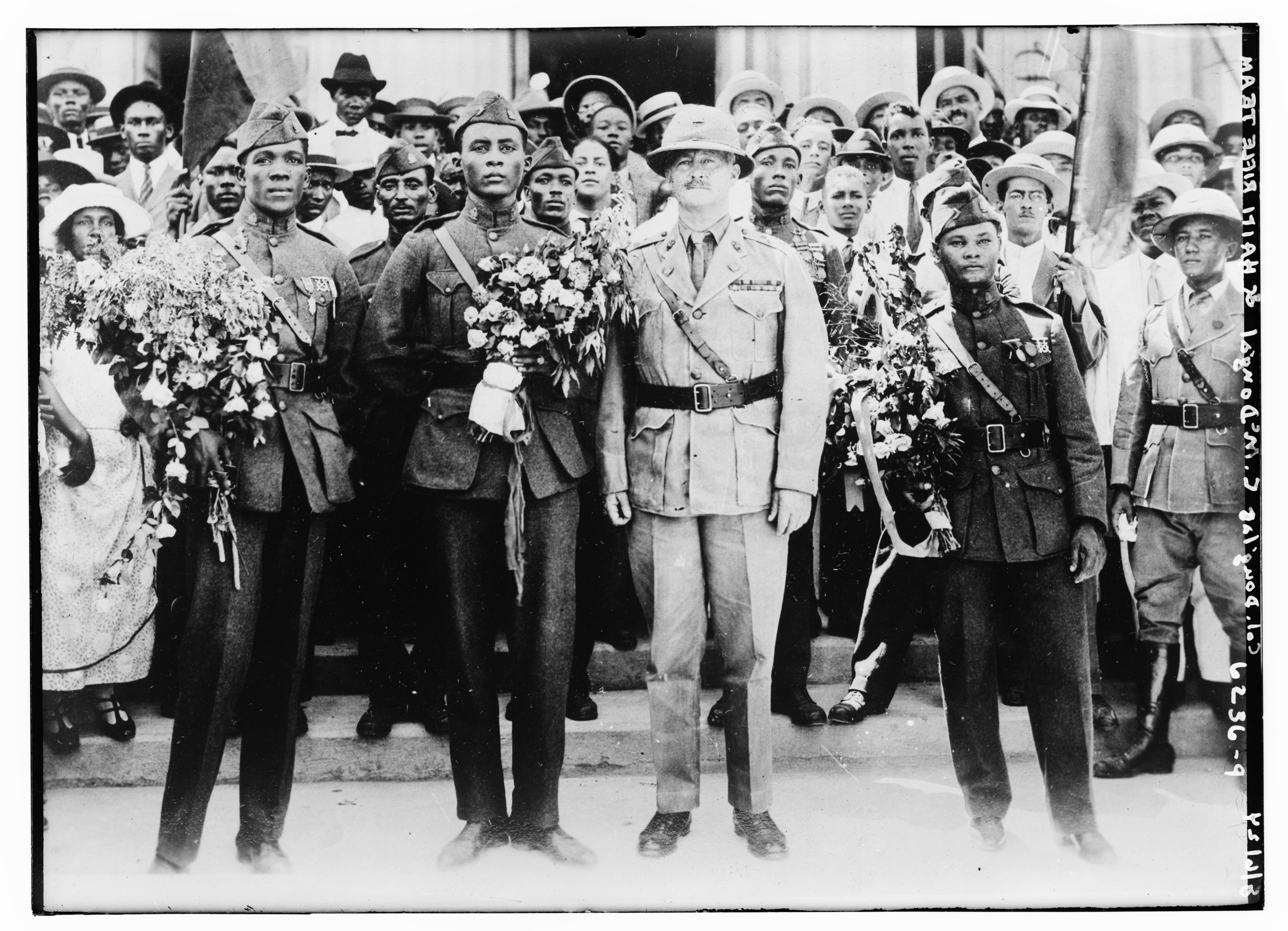

Personal information
- Nationality: Haitian
- Born: 1895

Sport
- Sport: Sports shooting
Medal record
Men's shooting
Representing Haiti
Olympic Games
Bronze medal – third place	1924 Paris	Team free rifle

Destin Destine (born 1895, date of death unknown) was an Olympic sport shooter who was part of the team that won Haiti's first ever Olympic medal—a bronze in team free rifle at the 1924 Summer Olympics.
