= Eric Halley =

South African sports shooter (1893–1953)

Personal information
- Born: 3 December 1893 Dunedin, New Zealand
- Died: 17 June 1953 (aged 59) Pietermaritzburg, South Africa

Sport
- Sport: Sports shooting

Eric Halley (3 December 1893 – 17 June 1953) was a South African sports shooter. He competed in two events at the 1924 Summer Olympics.
