= List of flag bearers for Haiti at the Olympics =

Haiti at the Olympics
- IOC code: HAI
- NOC: Comité Olympique Haïtien
- Medals: Gold 0 Silver 1 Bronze 1 Total 2

Summer appearances
- 1900; 1904–1920; 1924; 1928; 1932; 1936; 1948–1956; 1960; 1964–1968; 1972; 1976; 1980; 1984; 1988; 1992; 1996; 2000; 2004; 2008; 2012; 2016; 2020; 2024

Winter appearances
- 2022; 2026

This is a list of flag bearers who have represented Haiti at the Olympics.

Flag bearers carry the national flag of their country at the opening ceremony of the Olympic Games.

== 1936 flag incident ==
Haiti's only athlete in 1936 was weightlifter René A. Ambroise (from Jacmel), a student based in Paris, where he had taken up the sport. He carried the Haitian flag at the opening ceremony. Having discovered that the civil flag of Haiti was identical to that of Liechtenstein when the latter delegation arrived at the Games, both nations decided to carry different flags in the opening ceremony. Liechtenstein received approval from their government to carry their flag upside-down and add a "Prince's Hat" crown in the corner, while Ambroise added the national crest to his flag (to make it the state flag). As a nation, Liechtenstein then changed its flag in 1937.

== List of flag bearers ==
#	Event year	Season	Flag bearer	Sport
1	1936	Summer	René A. Ambroise	Weightlifting
2	1972	Summer	Jules Meliner	
3	1984	Summer	Ronald Agénor	Tennis
4	1988	Summer	Deborah Saint Phard	Athletics
5	1992	Summer	Hermate Souffrant	Judo
6	1996	Summer	Adler Volmar	Judo
7	2000	Summer	Nadine Faustin-Parker	Athletics
8	2004	Summer	Tudor Sanon	Taekwondo
9	2008	Summer	Joel Brutus	Judo
10	2012	Summer	Linouse Desravine	Judo
11	2016	Summer	Asnage Castelly	Wrestling
12	2020	Summer	Sabiana Anestor	Judo
12	2020	Summer	Darrelle Valsaint	Boxing
13	2022	Winter	Richardson Viano	Alpine skiing
14	2024	Summer	Lynnzee Brown	Gymnastics
14	2024	Summer	Philippe Metellus	Judo
15	2026	Winter	Stevenson Savart	Cross-country skiing

== See also ==
- Haiti at the Olympics
