= Haiti at the 2020 Summer Olympics =

- IOC code: HAI
- NOC: Comité Olympique Haïtien

in Tokyo, Japan July 23, 2021 – August 8, 2021
- Competitors: 6 in 5 sports
- Flag bearers (opening): Sabiana Anestor; Darrelle Valsaint
- Flag bearer (closing): Mulern Jean
- Medals: Gold 0 Silver 0 Bronze 0 Total 0

Summer Olympics appearances (overview)
- 1900; 1904–1920; 1924; 1928; 1932; 1936; 1948–1956; 1960; 1964–1968; 1972; 1976; 1980; 1984; 1988; 1992; 1996; 2000; 2004; 2008; 2012; 2016; 2020; 2024

Haiti competed at the 2020 Summer Olympics in Tokyo. Originally scheduled to take place from 24 July to 9 August 2020, the Games were postponed to 23 July to 8 August 2021, because of the COVID-19 pandemic. It was the nation's seventeenth appearance at the Summer Olympics since its debut in 1900.

The early days at the Olympics was nearly overshadowed by the assassination of Jovenel Moïse, the country's last president two weeks earlier, allowing Haitian athletes to express their grief.

== Competitors ==
The following is a list of the number of competitors participating in the Games for Haiti:

Sport	Men	Women	Total
Athletics	0	1	1
Boxing	1	0	1
Judo	0	1	1
Swimming	1	1	2
Taekwondo	0	1	1
Total	2	4	6

== Athletics ==
Haiti received a universality slot from the World Athletics to send a female track and field athlete to the Olympics. Vanessa Clerveaux withdrew from the team because of injury.

Key

- Note–Ranks given for track events are within the athlete's heat only
- Q = Qualified for the next round
- q = Qualified for the next round as a fastest loser or, in field events, by position without achieving the qualifying target
- NR = National record
- N/A = Round not applicable for the event
- Bye = Athlete not required to compete in round

Track & road events

Athlete	Event	Heat		Semifinal		Final	
Athlete	Event	Result	Rank	Result	Rank	Result	Rank
Mulern Jean	Women's 100 m hurdles	12.99 SB	5 q	13.09	7	Did not advance	

== Boxing ==
Haiti received an invitation from the Tripartite Commission to send the men's middleweight boxer Darrelle Valsaint to the Olympics.

Athlete	Event	Round of 32	Round of 16	Quarterfinals	Semifinals	Final	
Athlete	Event	Opposition Result	Opposition Result	Opposition Result	Opposition Result	Opposition Result	Rank
Darrelle Valsaint	Men's middleweight	Bye	Tshama (COD); W 4–1	Bakshi (ROC); L 0–5	Did not advance		

== Judo ==
Haiti qualified one judoka for the women's half-lightweight category (52 kg) at the Games. Sabiana Anestor accepted a continental berth from the Americas as the nation's top-ranked judoka outside of direct qualifying position in the IJF World Ranking List of June 28, 2021.

Athlete	Round of 32	Round of 16	Quarterfinals	Semifinals	Repechage	Final / BM	
Athlete	Opposition Result	Opposition Result	Opposition Result	Opposition Result	Opposition Result	Opposition Result	Rank
Sabiana Anestor	Women's −52 kg	Levytska-Shukvani (GEO); L 00–10	Did not advance				

== Swimming ==
Haiti received a universality invitation from FINA to send two top-ranked swimmers (one per gender) in their respective individual events to the Olympics, based on the FINA Points System of June 28, 2021.

Athlete	Event	Heat		Semifinal		Final	
Athlete	Event	Time	Rank	Time	Rank	Time	Rank
Davidson Vincent	Men's 100 m butterfly	54.81	=51	Did not advance			
Emilie Grand'Pierre	Women's 100 m breaststroke	1:14.82	37	Did not advance			

== Taekwondo ==
Haiti entered one athlete into the taekwondo competition at the Games. Florida-born practitioner Aliyah Shipman secured a spot in the women's welterweight category (67 kg) with a top two finish at the 2020 Pan American Qualification Tournament in San José, Costa Rica. The United States Olympic & Paralympic Committee blocked her from participation on the grounds that athletes need three years to change the country they represent, and she fought for the United States one year before. Shipman tried to appeal, backed by the Haitian Taekwondo Federation, on the condition that junior athletes do not fall under the same waiting period, but it fell through, so her spot was awarded to another American, Lauren Lee.

Athlete	Event	Round of 16	Quarterfinals	Semifinals	Repechage	Final / BM	
Athlete	Event	Opposition Result	Opposition Result	Opposition Result	Opposition Result	Opposition Result	Rank
Lauren Lee	Women's −67 kg	Jelić (CRO); L 2–22	Did not advance		Titoneli (BRA); L 5–26 PTG	Did not advance	7

== See also ==
- Haiti at the 2019 Pan American Games
