= Dieudonné LaMothe =

Haitian long-distance runner

Dieudonné Michel LaMothe
Personal information
- Nationality: Haitian
- Born: 29 July 1954 (age 71)
- Height: 5 ft 9 in (175 cm)
- Weight: 143 lb (65 kg)

Sport
- Country: Haiti
- Sport: Athletics
- Event: Long distance
Medal record
Central American and Caribbean Games
Bronze medal – third place	1986 Santiago de los Caballeros	Marathon

Dieudonné LaMothe (born 29 July 1954) is a Haitian long-distance runner, the first sportsperson from his country to take part in four Olympic Games.

== Olympic Games ==
LaMothe competed in the 5000 metres at the 1976 Summer Olympics and the marathon at the 1984, 1988 and 1992 Games. He finished last in the 5000 metres in 1976 and last again in the 1984 marathon, although in that case he nevertheless beat the 29 athletes who did not complete the course.

LaMothe was one of a number of Haitian runners sent to the Olympic Games by the "Baby Doc" Duvalier regime during the 1970s and 1980s - mostly picked from among Duvalier's personal friends - who gained notoriety by setting record worst times, many of which are still held. Other such athletes include Anilus Joseph, who started his 1972 10,000 metres qualifying heat too fast, leading the pack for two laps but dropping out with a mile still to run; Wilnor Joseph, whose 800 metres in 1976 took 2:15.26; and Charles Olemus, who ran for over 42 minutes to complete the 1976 10,000 metres race.

In 1986, after the overthrow of Duvalier's government, LaMothe gave an interview in which he claimed to have feared for his life at the hands of the dictator's regime if he did not complete the 1984 marathon. According to LaMothe, he was told that he would take part in the Games only a fortnight before the team left for Los Angeles and received only $250 for his participation. He borrowed his running kit from two Americans and eventually completed the race in 2:52:18, in 78th and last place.

Although he hoped to achieve a top ten placing, LaMothe's best result in the Summer Olympics was 20th place in the marathon at the 1988 Games in Seoul, in a time of 2h 16m 15s. He was 38 years and 15 days old when he competed in the 1992 Games in Barcelona, making him Haiti's oldest ever participant in the Olympics.

== Other competitions ==
With funding from friends, LaMothe was able to take part in the 1985 New York City Marathon, which he completed in 60th place. He won the bronze medal in the marathon at the 1986 Central American and Caribbean Games and came sixth in the marathon at the 1987 Pan American Games. LaMothe still holds the Haitian record for the men's marathon of 2:14:22, achieved in France in April 1988. He won the 1996 Long Island Marathon by seven seconds.

LaMothe again represented Haiti in the 5000 metres at the 1991 World Athletics Championship but failed to finish his qualifying heat.
