= Haiti at the 1928 Summer Olympics =

- IOC code: HAI
- NOC: Comité Olympique Haïtien

in Amsterdam
- Competitors: 2
- Medals Ranked 30th: Gold 0 Silver 1 Bronze 0 Total 1

Summer Olympics appearances (overview)
- 1900; 1904–1920; 1924; 1928; 1932; 1936; 1948–1956; 1960; 1964–1968; 1972; 1976; 1980; 1984; 1988; 1992; 1996; 2000; 2004; 2008; 2012; 2016; 2020; 2024

Haiti competed at the 1928 Summer Olympics in Amsterdam, Netherlands. The country's delegation consisted of two track and field athletes, V.A. Theard and Silvio Cator. Cator finished in second place in the long jump, winning Haiti's first silver medal and the second medal of any kind for the country.

== Medalists ==
Medal	Name	Sport	Event	Date
Silver	Silvio Cator	Athletics	Men's long jump	July 31

== Athletics ==
Key

- Note–Ranks given for track events are within the athlete's heat only
- Q = Qualified for the next round
- q = Qualified for the next round as a fastest loser or, in field events, by position without achieving the qualifying target
- NR = National record
- N/A = Round not applicable for the event
- Bye = Athlete not required to compete in round
- NP = Not placed

Men
Track & road events

Athlete	Event	Heat		Quarterfinal		Semifinal		Final	
Athlete	Event	Result	Rank	Result	Rank	Result	Rank	Result	Rank
André Théard	100 m	Unknown	2 Q	Unknown	3	did not advance			
André Théard	200 m	Unknown	3	did not advance					

Men
Field Events

Athlete	Event	Qualification		Final	
Athlete	Event	Distance	Position	Distance	Position
Silvio Cator	Long Jump	7.58	2 Q	7.58	2nd place, silver medalist(s)
