= Haiti at the 1988 Summer Olympics =

- IOC code: HAI
- NOC: Comité Olympique Haïtien

in Seoul
- Competitors: 4 in 2 sports
- Flag bearer: Deborah Saint Phard
- Medals: Gold 0 Silver 0 Bronze 0 Total 0

Summer Olympics appearances (overview)
- 1900; 1904–1920; 1924; 1928; 1932; 1936; 1948–1956; 1960; 1964–1968; 1972; 1976; 1980; 1984; 1988; 1992; 1996; 2000; 2004; 2008; 2012; 2016; 2020; 2024

Haiti competed at the 1988 Summer Olympics in Seoul, South Korea. Haiti's delegation consisted of four competitors and one official.

== Competitors ==
The following is the list of number of competitors in the Games.

Sport	Men	Women	Total
Athletics	2	1	3
Tennis	1	0	1
Total	3	1	4

== Athletics ==
Men
Track and road events

Athlete	Event	Heat Round 1		Heat Round 2		Semifinal		Final	
Athlete	Event	Time	Rank	Time	Rank	Time	Rank	Time	Rank
Claude Roumain	100 metres	11.22	94	Did not advance					
Claude Roumain	200 metres	22.60	66	Did not advance					
Dieudonné Lamothe	Marathon	—N/a						2:16:15	20

Women
Field events

Athlete	Event	Qualification		Final	
Athlete	Event	Distance	Position	Distance	Position
Deborah Saint Phard	Shot put	16.02	19	Did not advance	

== Tennis ==
Men

Athlete	Event	Round of 64	Round of 32	Round of 16	Quarterfinals	Semifinals	Final	
Athlete	Event	Opposition Result	Opposition Result	Opposition Result	Opposition Result	Opposition Result	Opposition Result	Rank
Ronald Agénor	Singles	Lavalle (MEX); L 6–3, 3–6, 2–6, 1–2 Retired	Did not advance					
