= Haiti at the 1972 Summer Olympics =

- IOC code: HAI
- NOC: Comité Olympique Haïtien

in Munich
- Competitors: 7 in 1 sport
- Flag bearer: Jules Meliner
- Medals: Gold 0 Silver 0 Bronze 0 Total 0

Summer Olympics appearances (overview)
- 1900; 1904–1920; 1924; 1928; 1932; 1936; 1948–1956; 1960; 1964–1968; 1972; 1976; 1980; 1984; 1988; 1992; 1996; 2000; 2004; 2008; 2012; 2016; 2020; 2024

Haiti competed at the 1972 Summer Olympics in Munich, West Germany. It was the first time in 12 years that the nation had sent athletes to the Olympic Games. Haiti's delegation consisted of seven competitors, all track and field athletes, and eight officials. One of the athletes, Elsie Baptiste, ended up not competing in any events. The only other woman on the team, Mireille Joseph, ran in the 100 metre race, becoming the first Haitian woman to compete in the Olympics. Among the delegation's officials were Lamartine Clermont, Franck Godefroy, Jacques Joachim, Philomene Joachim, Jules Merine, and Jean-M. Verly.

== Results by event ==
=== Athletics ===
Men's 100 metres

- Pierre-Richard Gaetjens

- Round 1 — 11.50 seconds (→ did not advance)

Men's 200 metres

- Gary Georges

- Round 1 — 22.97 seconds (→ did not advance)

Men's 400 metres

- Jean-Max Faustin

- Round 1 — 52.33 seconds (→ did not advance)

Men's 800 metres

- Fritz Pierre

- Round 1 — 2:01.5 (→ did not advance)

Men's 10000 metres

- Anilus Joseph

- Round 1 — did not finish (→ did not advance)

Men's marathon

- Maurice Charlotin — 3:29:21.0 (→ 62nd place, last finisher)

Women's 100 metres

- Mireille Joseph

- Round 1 — 13.84 (→ did not advance)
