= Darrelle Valsaint =

Haitian boxer (born 2000)

Personal information
- Nationality: Haitian; American
- Born: Darrelle Valsaint Jr. 29 May 2000 (age 26) Orlando, Florida, United States
- Height: 6 ft 1 in (185 cm)
- Weight: Middleweight

Boxing career
- Stance: Southpaw

Boxing record
- Total fights: 12
- Wins: 11
- Win by KO: 9
- No contests: 1

Darrelle Valsaint Jr. (born 29 May 2000) is a professional boxer. Holding dual Haitian and American citizenship, he competed for Haiti at the 2020 Summer Olympics.

== Amateur career ==
Haiti received an invitation from the Tripartite Commission to send the Valsaint to the 2020 Summer Olympics. Representing that country, he competed in the men's middleweight event at the Tokyo Olympics, where he lost to Gleb Bakshi in the quarterfinals.

== Professional career ==
Following the 2020 Olympics, Valsaint was signed by Tim VanNewhouse in December 2021.

== Professional boxing record ==
12 fights	11 wins	0 losses
By knockout	9	0
By decision	2	0
No contests	1	

No.	Result	Record	Opponent	Type	Round, time	Date	Location	Notes
12	NC	11–0 (1)	(Mexico) Angel Ruiz Astorga	NC	4 (10) 1:33	Nov 9, 2024	(United States) Osceola Heritage Park, Kissimmee, Florida, U.S.	
11	Win	11–0	(United States) Pachino Hill	KO	3 (8) 0:36	Jun 5, 2024	(United States) ProBox TV Events Center, Plant City, Florida, U.S.	
10	Win	10–0	(Brazil) Diego Allan Iablonski	KO	1 (8) 2:59	Oct 18, 2023	(United States) Whitesands Events Center, Plant City, Florida, U.S.	
9	Win	9–0	(Ghana) Daniel Aduku	KO	4 (8) 0:49	Jul 26, 2023	(United States) Kissimmee Civic Center, Kissimmee, Florida, U.S.	
8	Win	8–0	(Argentina) Marcelo Fabian Bzowski	KO	2 (6) 2:15	May 17, 2023	(United States) Whitesands Events Center, Plant City, Florida, U.S.	
7	Win	7–0	(Brazil) Lucas De Abreu	UD	6	Feb 22, 2023	(United States) Whitesands Events Center, Plant City, Florida, U.S.	
6	Win	6–0	(United States) Paul Mendez	KO	2 (4) 2:28	Oct 7, 2022	(United States) Whitesands Events Center, Plant City, Florida, U.S.	
5	Win	5–0	(United States) Leemont Johnson	KO	2 (4) 2:43	Aug 5, 2022	(United States) Whitesands Events Center, Plant City, Florida, U.S.	
4	Win	4–0	(Costa Rica) Encarnacion Diaz	KO	1 (4) 2:49	Jun 17, 2022	Coliseo de Combates, Panama City, Panama	
3	Win	3–0	(Argentina) Geronimo Nahuel Sacco	KO	1 (4) 2:04	Mar 25, 2022	(United States) Whitesands Events Center, Plant City, Florida, U.S.	
2	Win	2–0	(United States) Delvecchio Savage	UD	4	Feb 12, 2021	(United States) Avanti Palms Resort, Orlando, Florida, U.S.	
1	Win	1–0	(United States) Christopher Lavant	KO	1 (4) 0:49	Nov 20, 2020	(United States) Ocean Center, Daytona Beach, Florida, U.S.	

Olympic Games
Preceded by Asnage Castelly	Flag bearer for Haiti; 2020 Tokyo with Sabiana Anestor	Succeeded by Richardson Viano
