= Haiti at the 1976 Summer Olympics =

- IOC code: HAI
- NOC: Comité Olympique Haïtien

in Montreal
- Competitors: 13 in 2 sports
- Medals: Gold 0 Silver 0 Bronze 0 Total 0

Summer Olympics appearances (overview)
- 1900; 1904–1920; 1924; 1928; 1932; 1936; 1948–1956; 1960; 1964–1968; 1972; 1976; 1980; 1984; 1988; 1992; 1996; 2000; 2004; 2008; 2012; 2016; 2020; 2024

Haiti competed at the 1976 Summer Olympics in Montreal, Quebec, Canada. Haiti sent ten track and field athletes and three boxers to the games. As the athletes were amateurs, picked by President Jean-Claude "Baby Doc" Duvalier out of his personal friends, they had remarkedly poor times, with Dieudonné LaMothe earning the worst results ever at the 5000 metres. Among the officials was Gérard Raoul Rouzier, who served on the Football Disciplinary Commission.

== Results by event ==
=== Athletics ===
Women's 100 metres

- Antoinette Gauthier

- Round 1 — 13.11 seconds (→ did not advance)

Women's 200 metres

- M. Louise Pierre

- Round 1 — 28.19 seconds (→ did not advance)

Women's 400 metres

- Rose Gauthier

- Round 1 — 1:13.27 (→ did not advance)

Men's 100 metres

- Philippe Étienne

- Round 1 — 11.05 seconds (→ did not advance)

Men's 200 metres

- Philippe Étienne

- Round 1 — 22.57 seconds (→ did not advance)

Men's 400 metres

- Wilfrid Cyriaque

- Round 1 — 51.49 seconds (→ did not advance)

Men's 800 metres

- Wilnor Joseph

- Round 1 — 2:15.26 (→ did not advance)

Men's 1500 metres

- Emmanuel Saint-Hilaire

- Round 1 — 4:23.41 (→ did not advance)

Men's 5000 metres

- Dieudonné Lamothe

- Qualifying round — 18:50.07 (→ did not advance)

Men's 10000 metres

- Charles Olemus

- Qualifying round — 42:00.11 (→ did not advance)

Men's Marathon

- Thanculé Dezart — did not finish (→ no ranking)
- Charles Olemus — did not start (→ no ranking)

=== Boxing ===
Lightweight (−60 kg)

- Yves Jeudy

- Round 1 — Bye
- Round 2 — Won by forfeit
- Round 3 — Bye
- Quarterfinals — Lost to Ace Rusevski of Yugoslavia, referee stopped fight in the 2nd round (→ did not advance)

Light Welterweight (−63.5 kg)

- Siergot Sully

- Round 1 — Lost to Ismael Martinez of Puerto Rico, 5–0 (→ did not advance)

Welterweight (−67 kg)

- Wesly Felix

- Round 1 — Bye
- Round 2 — Won by forfeit
- Round 3 — Lost to Clinton Jackson of the United States, knocked out in the 1st round (→ did not advance)

== Notes ==
- Official Report
