= Haiti at the 1932 Summer Olympics =

- IOC code: HAI
- NOC: Comité Olympique Haïtien

in Los Angeles
- Competitors: 2 in 1 sport
- Medals: Gold 0 Silver 0 Bronze 0 Total 0

Summer Olympics appearances (overview)
- 1900; 1904–1920; 1924; 1928; 1932; 1936; 1948–1956; 1960; 1964–1968; 1972; 1976; 1980; 1984; 1988; 1992; 1996; 2000; 2004; 2008; 2012; 2016; 2020; 2024

Haiti competed at the 1932 Summer Olympics in Los Angeles, United States. The country's delegation consisted of two track and field athletes, André Theard and Sylvio Cator. Cator had previously won a silver medal at the 1928 Olympics.

== Athletics results ==
Men's 100 meters

- André Theard

- Round 1 — ≥ 10.9 seconds (→ did not advance)

Men's long jump

- Sylvio Cator — 5.93 meters (→ 9th place)
