= Haiti at the 2016 Summer Olympics =

- IOC code: HAI
- NOC: Comité Olympique Haïtien

in Rio de Janeiro
- Competitors: 10 in 7 sports
- Flag bearer: Asnage Castelly
- Medals: Gold 0 Silver 0 Bronze 0 Total 0

Summer Olympics appearances (overview)
- 1900; 1904–1920; 1924; 1928; 1932; 1936; 1948–1956; 1960; 1964–1968; 1972; 1976; 1980; 1984; 1988; 1992; 1996; 2000; 2004; 2008; 2012; 2016; 2020; 2024

Haiti competed at the 2016 Summer Olympics in Rio de Janeiro, Brazil, from 5 to 21 August 2016. It was the nation's sixteenth appearance at the Summer Olympics since its debut in 1900.

Haitian Olympic Committee (French: Comité Olympique Haïtien, COH) sent the nation's largest delegation to the Games since 1976. A total of 10 athletes, 7 men and 3 women, were selected to the Haitian team across seven sports.

Eight Haitian athletes were born and raised in the United States, having acquired a dual citizenship to represent their parents' homeland at these Games. Among them were taekwondo fighter Aniya Louissaint, 19-year-old light welterweight boxer Richardson Hitchins, first female swimmer Naomy Grand'Pierre (born in Canada), female hurdler Mulern Jean, male hurdler Jeffrey Julmis, the lone returning athlete from London 2012, and freestyle wrestler Asnage Castelly, who eventually led the team as the oldest competitor (aged 38) and Haiti's flag bearer in the opening ceremony. While the American-born athletes shared their kinship ties with Haiti, freestyle swimmer Frantz Dorsainvil and weightlifter Edouard Joseph (men's 62 kg) were the nation's only homegrown Olympians on the team.

Before Rio de Janeiro, Haitian athletes yielded a tally of two Olympic medals, a silver won by long jumper Silvio Cator in 1928, and a bronze by a team of five rifle shooters in 1924. Haiti, however, did not win its first Olympic medal for nearly nine decades.

== Athletics (track and field) ==
Haitian athletes achieved qualifying standards in the following athletics events (up to a maximum of 3 athletes in each event):

Key

- Note–Ranks given for track events are within the athlete's heat only
- Q = Qualified for the next round
- q = Qualified for the next round as a fastest loser or, in field events, by position without achieving the qualifying target
- NR = National record
- N/A = Round not applicable for the event
- Bye = Athlete not required to compete in round

Track & road events

Athlete	Event	Heat		Quarterfinal		Semifinal		Final	
Athlete	Event	Result	Rank	Result	Rank	Result	Rank	Result	Rank
Jeffrey Julmis	Men's 110 m hurdles	13.66	3 Q	—		DSQ		Did not advance	
Darrell Wesh	Men's 100 m	Bye		10.39	8	Did not advance			
Mulern Jean	Women's 100 m hurdles	DSQ		—		Did not advance			

== Boxing ==
Haiti entered one boxer to compete in the men's light welterweight division into the Olympic boxing tournament. Richardson Hitchins claimed an Olympic spot with a quarterfinal victory at the 2016 AIBA World Qualifying Tournament in Baku, Azerbaijan.

Athlete	Event	Round of 32	Round of 16	Quarterfinals	Semifinals	Final	
Athlete	Event	Opposition Result	Opposition Result	Opposition Result	Opposition Result	Opposition Result	Rank
Richardson Hitchins	Men's light welterweight	Russell (USA); L 0–3	Did not advance				

== Judo ==
Haiti qualified one judoka for the men's lightweight category (73 kg) at the Games. Josue Deprez earned a continental quota spot from the Pan American region as the highest-ranked Haitian judoka outside of direct qualifying position in the IJF World Ranking List of May 30, 2016.

Athlete	Event	Round of 64	Round of 32	Round of 16	Quarterfinals	Semifinals	Repechage	Final / BM	
Athlete	Event	Opposition Result	Opposition Result	Opposition Result	Opposition Result	Opposition Result	Opposition Result	Opposition Result	Rank
Josue Deprez	Men's −73 kg	Bye	Wandtke (GER); L 000–000 S	Did not advance					

== Swimming ==
Haiti received a Universality invitation from FINA to send two swimmers (one male and one female) to the Olympics, signifying the nation's return to the sport for the first time since 1996.

Athlete	Event	Heat		Semifinal		Final	
Athlete	Event	Time	Rank	Time	Rank	Time	Rank
Frantz Dorsainvil	Men's 50 m freestyle	30.86	85	Did not advance			
Naomy Grand'Pierre	Women's 50 m freestyle	27.46	56	Did not advance			

== Taekwondo ==
Haiti received an invitation from the Tripartite Commission to send Aniya Louissaint in the women's welterweight category (67 kg) into the Olympic taekwondo competition, signifying the nation's Olympic comeback to the sport for the first time since 2004.

Athlete	Event	Round of 16	Quarterfinals	Semifinals	Repechage	Final / BM	
Athlete	Event	Opposition Result	Opposition Result	Opposition Result	Opposition Result	Opposition Result	Rank
Aniya Louissaint	Women's −67 kg	Niaré (FRA); L 4–5	Did not advance		Gbagbi (CIV); L 2–7	Did not advance	7

== Weightlifting ==
Haiti received an invitation from the Tripartite Commission to send Edouard Joseph in the men's featherweight category (62 kg) to the Olympics, signifying the nation's Olympic return to the sport for the first time since 1960.

Athlete	Event	Snatch		Clean & Jerk		Total	Rank
Athlete	Event	Result	Rank	Result	Rank	Total	Rank
Edouard Joseph	Men's −62 kg	107	14	—	—	107	DNF

== Wrestling ==
Haiti received an invitation from the Tripartite Commission to send a wrestler competing in the men's freestyle 74 kg to the Olympics, signifying the nation's debut in the sport.

Key:

- VT – Victory by Fall.
- PP – Decision by Points – the loser with technical points.
- PO – Decision by Points – the loser without technical points.
- ST – Technical superiority – the loser without technical points and a margin of victory of at least 8 (Greco-Roman) or 10 (freestyle) points.

Men's freestyle

Athlete	Event	Qualification	Round of 16	Quarterfinal	Semifinal	Repechage 1	Repechage 2	Final / BM	
Athlete	Event	Opposition Result	Opposition Result	Opposition Result	Opposition Result	Opposition Result	Opposition Result	Opposition Result	Rank
Asnage Castelly	−74 kg	Bye	Yazdani (IRI); L 0–4 ^{ST}	Did not advance		Bye	Demirtaş (TUR); L 0–4 ^{ST}	Did not advance	19

== See also ==
- Haiti at the 2015 Pan American Games
