= Stevenson Savart =

Haitian cross-country skier (born 2000)

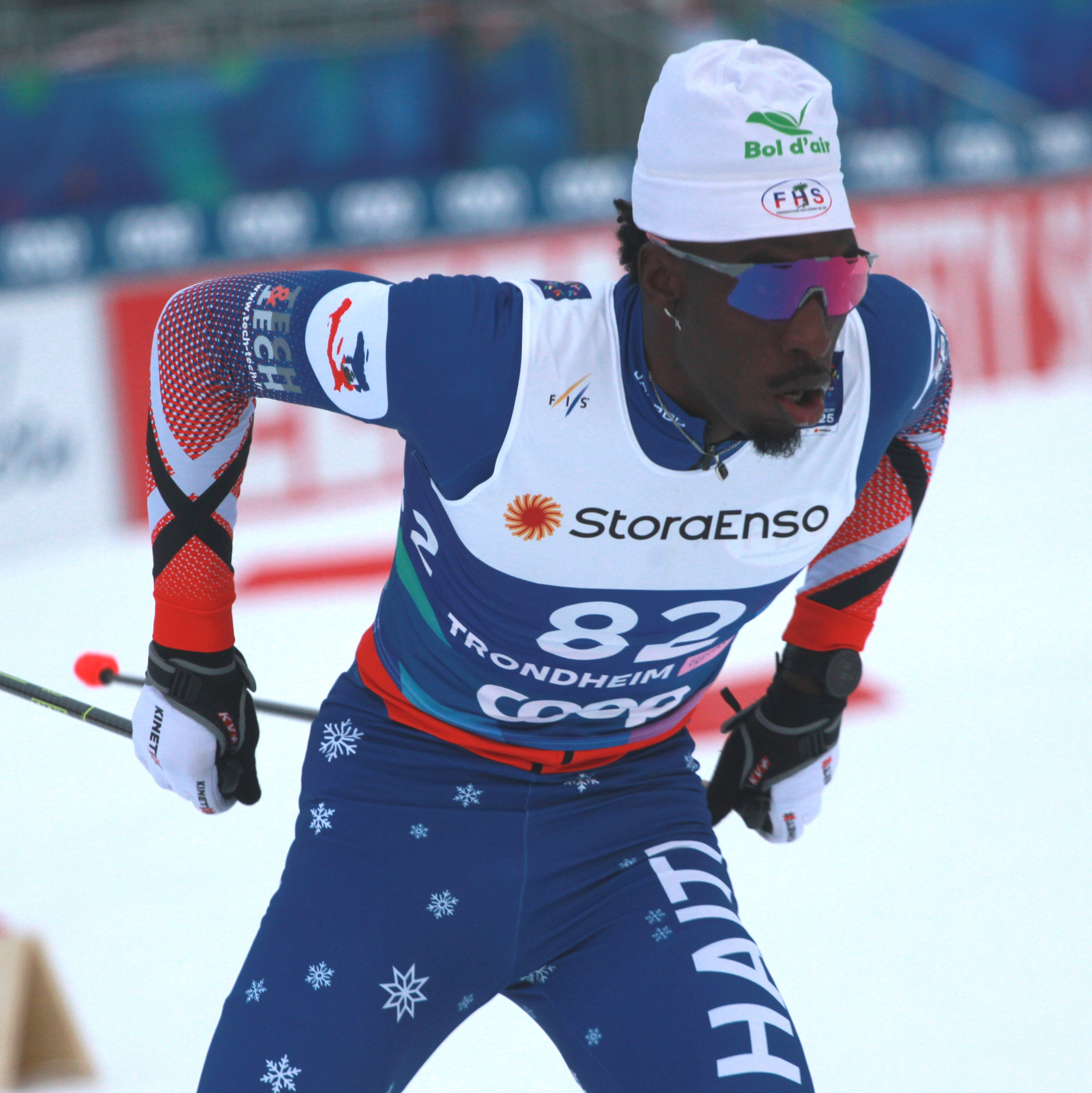
- Savart at the 2025 World Championships

Personal information
- National team: Haiti
- Born: 11 May 2000 (age 26) Delmas, Haiti

Sport
- Sport: Cross-country skiing

Stevenson Savart (born 11 May 2000) is a Haitian and French cross-country skier. He represented Haiti at the 2026 Winter Olympics and bore the nation's flag at the 2026 Winter Olympics opening ceremony. He was the first athlete to represent Haiti in cross-country skiing at the Olympics.

== Biography ==
Savart was born in Delmas, Haiti, in 2000. He moved to France when he was three years old and was adopted by French parents in La Bresse. His adoptive parents introduced him to skiing in the Vosges at five years old. He is a former student of the Toussaint Louverture High School in Pontarlier and now works as a teaching assistant there. He met his birth family in Haiti for the first time in 2015 and maintains contact with them.

He represented Haiti at the 2023–24 FIS Cross-Country World Cup before skiing for Haiti at the 2023 and 2025 World Championships. He purchased equipment to attend the 2026 Winter Olympics with a scholarship provided by the Olympic Solidarity program. He placed sixty-fourth in the 2026 Olympic men's skiathlon event.

== See also ==
- Richardson Viano
