= Haiti at the 1960 Summer Olympics =

- IOC code: HAI
- NOC: Comité Olympique Haïtien

in Rome
- Competitors: 1 in 1 sport
- Medals: Gold 0 Silver 0 Bronze 0 Total 0

Summer Olympics appearances (overview)
- 1900; 1904–1920; 1924; 1928; 1932; 1936; 1948–1956; 1960; 1964–1968; 1972; 1976; 1980; 1984; 1988; 1992; 1996; 2000; 2004; 2008; 2012; 2016; 2020; 2024

Haiti competed at the 1960 Summer Olympics in Rome, Italy. It was the first time in 28 years that the nation had sent athletes to the Olympic Games. Haiti's delegation consisted of two people, weightlifter Philome Laguerre and the head of the delegation, Pierre Plaisimond.

== Weightlifting ==
Men

Athlete	Event	Military Press		Snatch		Clean & Jerk		Total	Rank
Athlete	Event	Result	Rank	Result	Rank	Result	Rank	Total	Rank
Philome Laguerre	90 kg	137.5	5	NVL		DNS		DNF	
