= Haiti at the 2008 Summer Olympics =

- IOC code: HAI
- NOC: Comité Olympique Haïtien

in Beijing
- Competitors: 7 in 3 sports
- Flag bearer: Joel Brutus
- Medals: Gold 0 Silver 0 Bronze 0 Total 0

Summer Olympics appearances (overview)
- 1900; 1904–1920; 1924; 1928; 1932; 1936; 1948–1956; 1960; 1964–1968; 1972; 1976; 1980; 1984; 1988; 1992; 1996; 2000; 2004; 2008; 2012; 2016; 2020; 2024

Haiti sent a delegation to compete in the 2008 Summer Olympics held in Beijing, People's Republic of China, from August 8 to August 24, 2008. Its participation in Beijing marked its seventh consecutive appearance at the summer Olympics and its fourteenth appearance overall, with its first being at the 1900 Summer Olympics in Paris. The Haitian Olympic team included seven athletes (three men and four women) participating in track and field (Barbara Pierre, Ginou Etienne, Nadine Faustin-Parker, and Dudley Dorival), boxing (Azea Austinama), and judo (Joel Brutus and Ange Jean Baptiste). More women participated for Haiti in 2008 than at any single Olympic games prior. Although Pierre and Dorival advanced to quarterfinals in their events, there were no Haitian medalists in Beijing. Brutus carried his country's flag at the ceremonies.

== Background ==
For Haiti, the 2008 Beijing Olympics marked its fourteenth appearance at any Olympic games and its seventh consecutive appearance since the 1984 Summer Olympics in Los Angeles. Between that and its debut at the 1900 Summer Olympics in Paris, Haitian teams competed at the Olympics that took place during 1924 (Paris), 1928 (Amsterdam), 1932 (Los Angeles), 1960 (Rome), 1972 (Munich, West Germany), and 1976 (Montreál, Canada). As of 2008, Haiti had not participated at a Winter Olympics. The delegation that Haiti sent to Beijing included seven athletes across three sports. With four female athletes, more women participated for Haiti in Beijing than at any single Olympic games before. Prior to Beijing, athletes from Haiti had won one silver medal (by Silvio Cator in 1928) and one bronze medal (by five athletes in 1924). Between then and including the 2008 Olympics, Haitian athletes had not won medals in any event. Moise Joseph, an athlete of the University of Florida, was destined to participate for Haiti in Beijing, but did not compete.

Joel Brutus, a heavyweight judoka, was the flag bearer for Haiti at both the opening and closing ceremonies.

== Athletics ==
=== Women's competition ===
==== Women's 100 meters ====
Then 21-year-old athlete of Raleigh's St. Augustine's College Barbara Pierre participated in the women's 100 meters dash on Haiti's behalf in Beijing, marking her first appearance at any Olympic games. She was the only Haitian participating in the event. Pierre competed during the qualification round of the event, which took place on August 15, where she was placed in the tenth heat. Pierre placed fourth with a time of 11.52 seconds, placing directly behind Laverne Jones of the United States Virgin Islands (11.41 seconds) and ahead of Russia's Natalia Murinovich (11.55 seconds). The leaders of Pierre's heat were Jamaica's Kerron Stewart (11.28 seconds) and Norway's Ezinne Okparaebo (11.32 seconds). Overall, Pierre placed 30th out of the 85 athletes who participated in the qualification round. She advanced to quarterfinals, which took place on August 16.

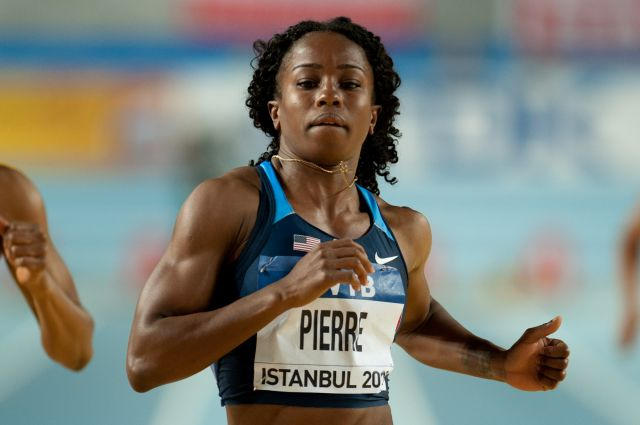
Barbara Pierre, who competed for Haiti in the 100 meters

During quarterfinals, Pierre participated in the fifth heat, where she ran her event in a time of 11.56 seconds. In doing so, Pierre placed fifth, ahead of Italy's Anita Pistone (11.56 seconds) and behind Okparaebo (11.45 seconds). The heat's leaders were Torri Edwards of the United States (11.31 seconds) and Lithuania's Lina Grincikaite (11.33 seconds). Pierre did not advance to semifinals.

==== Women's 400 meters ====
Ginou Etienne, who was 23 years old at the time of her participation in the Beijing Olympics, participated in the women's 400 meters event. She was the only Haitian participating in the event. Etienne had not previously appeared at any Olympic games. Etienne participated in the August 16 qualification round, where she was placed in the third heat. Etienne completed the event in 53.94 seconds, placing sixth in an event of seven participants. She defeated Rachidatou Seini Maikido of Niger (1:03.19) but fell behind the fifth-place finalist, Puerto Rico's Carol Rodriguez (53.08 seconds). The leaders of Etienne's heat were Russia's Anastasia Kapachinskaya (51.32 seconds) and the United States' Mary Wineberg (51.46 seconds). Out of the 50 athletes who participated in the qualification round, Etienne placed 41st. She did not advance to later rounds.

==== Women's 100 meters hurdles ====
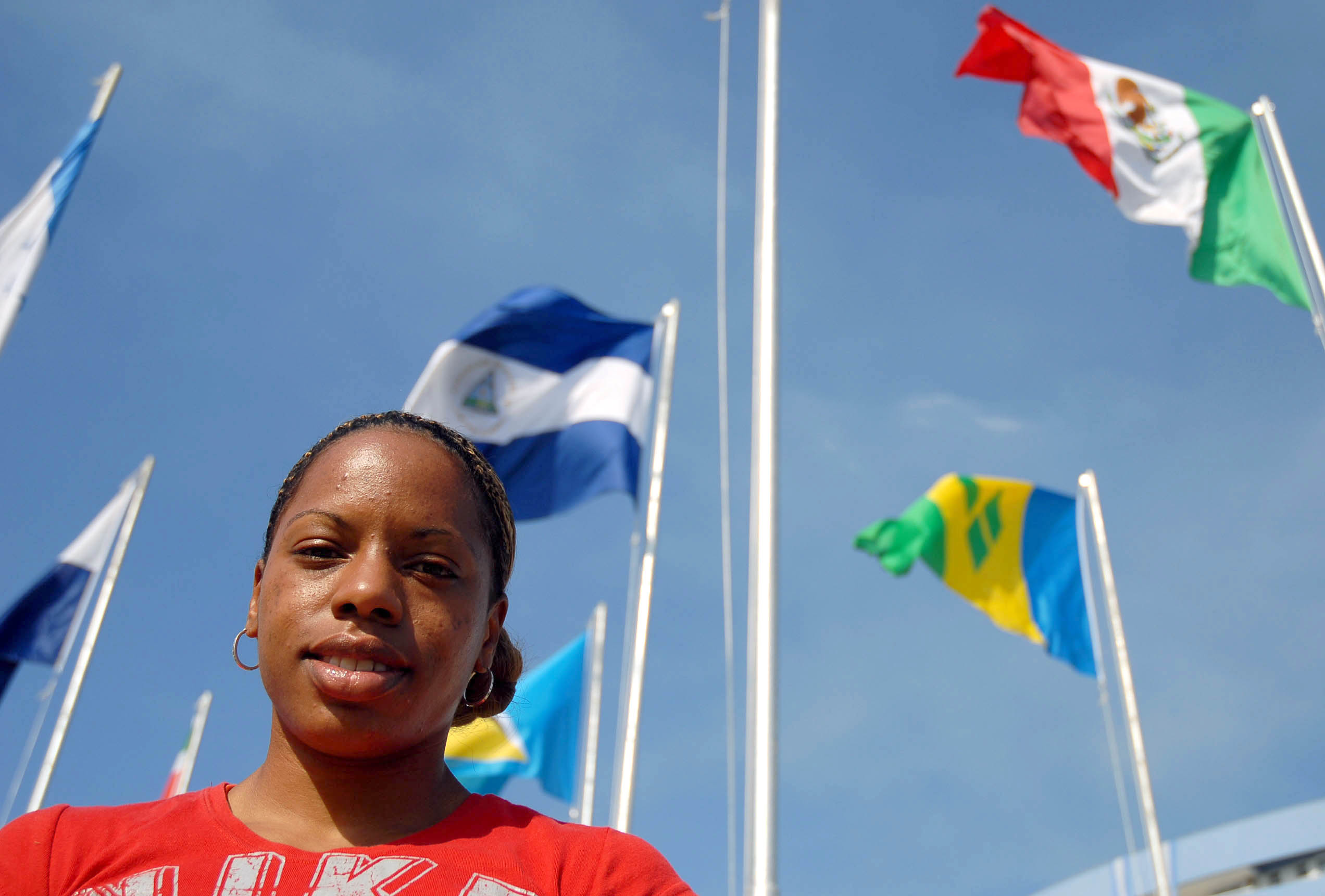
Nadine Faustin-Parker, who participated for Haiti in the 100 meters hurdles

Brussels-born Haitian athlete Nadine Faustin-Parker participated on Haiti's behalf at the Beijing Summer Olympics. She was 32 years old at the time, and was the only Haitian participating in the women's 100 meters hurdles. Faustin-Parker previously competed in the same event at both the 2000 Summer Olympics in Sydney and at the 2004 Summer Olympics in Athens. Faustin-Parker participated in the fifth heat during the August 17 preliminary round, completing her event in 13.25 seconds. She finished sixth out of eight athletes, ahead of Indonesia's Dedeh Erawati (13.49 seconds) and behind the Ukraine's Yevgeniya Snihur (13.06 seconds). Faustin-Parker finished in 29th place out of the 40 participating athletes. She did not advance to further rounds.

=== Men's competition ===
==== Men's 110 meters hurdles ====
New Jersey-born Dudley Dorival was the only male track athlete to participate on Haiti's behalf at the Beijing Olympics, where he participated in the men's 110 meters hurdles. His appearance at Beijing marked his third appearance; he previously participated in the Sydney Olympics in 2000 and the Athens Olympics in 2004, reaching the finals round and ranking seventh in the 110 meters hurdles in Sydney. Dorival participated in the third heat of the August 17 qualification round, completing his event in 13.78 seconds ahead of Pakistan's Abdul Rashid (14.52 seconds) and behind Puerto Rico's Héctor Cotto (13.72 seconds). The leaders of Dorival's heat were Colombia's Paulo Villar (13.37 seconds) and Barbados' Ryan Brathwaite (13.38 seconds). Overall, Dorival ranked 30th out of the 43 athletes who participated in the qualification round. Dorival advanced to quarterfinals.

At the August 19 quarterfinals, Dorival participated in the third heat and finished last out of seven finishing athletes, completing his event in 13.71 seconds. The eighth athlete in his heat, Mohamed Issa Al-Thawadi of Qatar, was disqualified. Dorival finished behind British athlete Allan Scott (13.66 seconds). The heat leaders of Dorival's quarterfinals heat were Jamaica's Maurice Wignall (13.36 seconds) and Brathwaite (13.44 seconds). Dorival finished 25th out of the 32 remaining athletes. He did not advance to semifinals.

=== Summary ===
Men

Athlete	Event	Heat		Quarterfinal		Semifinal		Final	
Athlete	Event	Result	Rank	Result	Rank	Result	Rank	Result	Rank
Dudley Dorival	110 m hurdles	13.78	7 q	13.71	7	Did not advance			

Women

Athlete	Event	Heat		Quarterfinal		Semifinal		Final	
Athlete	Event	Result	Rank	Result	Rank	Result	Rank	Result	Rank
Ginou Etienne	400 m	53.94	6	—		Did not advance			
Nadine Faustin-Parker	100 m hurdles	13.25	6	—		Did not advance			
Barbara Pierre	100 m	11.52	4 q	11.56	5	Did not advance			

Key

- Note–Ranks given for track events are within the athlete's heat only
- Q = Qualified for the next round
- q = Qualified for the next round as a fastest loser or, in field events, by position without achieving the qualifying target
- NR = National record
- N/A = Round not applicable for the event
- Bye = Athlete not required to compete in round

== Boxing ==
Haiti qualified one boxer for the Olympic boxing tournament. Azea Austinama qualified for the light heavyweight class at the second Americas' qualifying tournament.

The then 25-year-old, Miami-based, Augustama's appearance at Beijing was his first at any Olympic games. Augustama participated in the preliminary round of the light heavyweight class (maximum of 81 kilograms in weight), which took place on August 9. Over the four rounds in which Augustama faced Brazil's Washington Silva, Augustama scored two points–both in the third round. Silva scored a total of six points on Augustama across all rounds to win the bout and advance to the next round.

Athlete	Event	Round of 32	Round of 16	Quarterfinals	Semifinals	Final	
Athlete	Event	Opposition Result	Opposition Result	Opposition Result	Opposition Result	Opposition Result	Rank
Azea Augustama	Light heavyweight	Silva (BRA); L 2–6	Did not advance				

== Judo ==
=== Men's competition ===
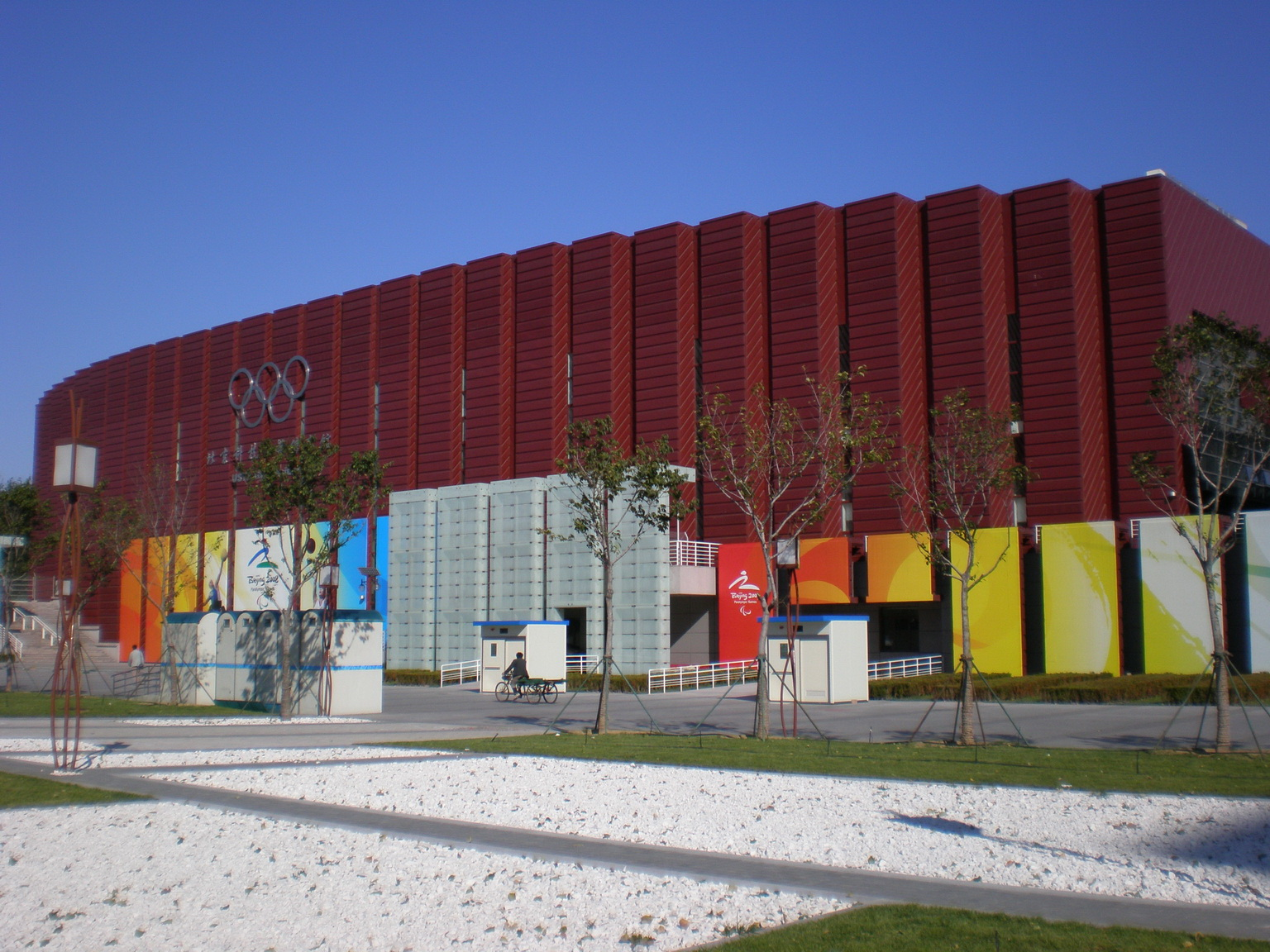
The Beijing Science and Technology University Gymnasium is where judo events were held for the Beijing Olympics.

Then 37-year-old Joel Brutus was the only male judoka to represent Haiti at Beijing. As a result of his weight, which exceeded 100 kilograms, he was placed in the heavyweight class. Brutus' appearance at Beijing marked his second Olympic appearance; he previously competed on Haiti's behalf as a heavyweight at the Athens Olympics in 2004. On August 15, Brutus participated in the twenty-sixth match of the Round of 64, the first round in which the judokas competed. Facing Kim Sung-Bum of South Korea, Brutus was defeated by Kim when he performed a seoi nage, scoring ippon. Brutus did not progress to further rounds.

=== Women's competition ===
Then 23-year-old Ange Jean Baptiste was the only female judoka to participate on Haiti's behalf at the Beijing Olympics. Her appearance at Beijing was her first at an Olympic games. Baptiste participated in the lightweight class, placing her against athletes under 57 kilograms in weight. In the August 11 Round of 32, the first round in which the judokas competed, Baptiste was set against Cuban judoka Yurisleydis Lupetey. Baptiste was defeated by Lupetey by a kuchiki-taoshi, receiving a score of waza-ari. As a result, she did not advance.

=== Summary ===
Athlete	Event	Preliminary	Round of 32	Round of 16	Quarterfinals	Semifinals	Repechage 1	Repechage 2	Repechage 3	Final / BM	
Athlete	Event	Opposition Result	Opposition Result	Opposition Result	Opposition Result	Opposition Result	Opposition Result	Opposition Result	Opposition Result	Opposition Result	Rank
Joel Brutus	Men's +100 kg	Kim S-B (KOR); L 0000–1001	Did not advance								
Ange Jean Baptiste	Women's −57 kg	—	Lupetey (CUB); L 0000–0111	Did not advance							

== See also ==
- Haiti at the 2007 Pan American Games
- Haiti at the 2008 Summer Paralympics
- Haiti at the 2010 Central American and Caribbean Games
