= Haiti at the 2000 Summer Olympics =

- IOC code: HAI
- NOC: Comité Olympique Haïtien

in Sydney
- Competitors: 5 (3 men and 2 women) in 3 sports
- Flag bearer: Nadine Faustin
- Medals: Gold 0 Silver 0 Bronze 0 Total 0

Summer Olympics appearances (overview)
- 1900; 1904–1920; 1924; 1928; 1932; 1936; 1948–1956; 1960; 1964–1968; 1972; 1976; 1980; 1984; 1988; 1992; 1996; 2000; 2004; 2008; 2012; 2016; 2020; 2024

Haiti competed at the 2000 Summer Olympics in Sydney, Australia. The Haitian team consisted of five competitors: three track and field athletes, one judoka, and one tennis player.

== Competitors ==
The following is the list of number of competitors in the Games.

Sport	Men	Women	Total
Athletics	2	1	3
Judo	1	0	1
Tennis	0	1	1
Total	3	2	5

== Athletics ==
Key

- Note–Ranks given for track events are within the athlete's heat only
- Q = Qualified for the next round
- q = Qualified for the next round as a fastest loser or, in field events, by position without achieving the qualifying target
- NR = National record
- N/A = Round not applicable for the event
- Bye = Athlete not required to compete in round

Men
Track & road events

Athlete	Event	Heat		Quarterfinal		Semifinal		Final	
Athlete	Event	Result	Rank	Result	Rank	Result	Rank	Result	Rank
Gerald Clervil	400 m	46.69	8	—N/a		did not advance			
Dudley Dorival	110 m hurdles	13.33	1 Q	13.49	1 Q	13.35	3 Q	13.49	7

Women
Track & road events

Athlete	Event	Heat		Semifinal		Final	
Athlete	Event	Result	Rank	Result	Rank	Result	Rank
Nadine Faustin	100 m hurdles	13.13	5 q	13.25	5	did not advance	

== Judo ==
Athlete	Event	Round of 32	Round of 16	Quarterfinals	Semifinals	Repechage 1	Repechage 2	Repechage 3	Final / BM	
Athlete	Event	Opposition Result	Opposition Result	Opposition Result	Opposition Result	Opposition Result	Opposition Result	Opposition Result	Opposition Result	Rank
Ernst Laraque	Men's −73 kg	Zeļonijs (LAT); L 0000–1001	did not advance							

== Tennis ==
Women

Athlete	Event	Round of 64	Round of 32	Round of 16	Quarterfinals	Semifinals	Final	
Athlete	Event	Opposition Score	Opposition Score	Opposition Score	Opposition Score	Opposition Score	Opposition Score	Rank
Neyssa Etienne	Singles	Silvija Talaja (CRO); L 1–6, 0–6	did not advance					

== See also ==
- Haiti at the 1999 Pan American Games

== Sources ==
- Wallechinsky, David (2004). The Complete Book of the Summer Olympics (Athens 2004 Edition). Toronto, Canada. ISBN 1-894963-32-6.
- International Olympic Committee (2001). The Results. Retrieved 12 November 2005.
- Sydney Organising Committee for the Olympic Games (2001). Official Report of the XXVII Olympiad Volume 1: Preparing for the Games Archived 9 November 2000 at the Wayback Machine. Retrieved 20 November 2005.
- Sydney Organising Committee for the Olympic Games (2001). Official Report of the XXVII Olympiad Volume 2: Celebrating the Games Archived 31 July 2012 at the Wayback Machine. Retrieved 20 November 2005.
- Sydney Organising Committee for the Olympic Games (2001). The Results Archived 27 September 2007 at the Wayback Machine. Retrieved 20 November 2005.
- International Olympic Committee Web Site
- sports-reference
