= Haiti at the 2004 Summer Olympics =

- IOC code: HAI
- NOC: Comité Olympique Haïtien

in Athens
- Competitors: 8 in 4 sports
- Flag bearer: Tudor Sanon
- Medals: Gold 0 Silver 0 Bronze 0 Total 0

Summer Olympics appearances (overview)
- 1900; 1904–1920; 1924; 1928; 1932; 1936; 1948–1956; 1960; 1964–1968; 1972; 1976; 1980; 1984; 1988; 1992; 1996; 2000; 2004; 2008; 2012; 2016; 2020; 2024

Haiti competed at the 2004 Summer Olympics in Athens, Greece, from 13 to 29 August 2004.

== Athletics ==
Haitian athletes have so far achieved qualifying standards in the following athletics events (up to a maximum of 3 athletes in each event at the 'A' Standard, and 1 at the 'B' Standard).

Men
Track & road events

Athlete	Event	Heat		Quarterfinal		Semifinal		Final	
Athlete	Event	Result	Rank	Result	Rank	Result	Rank	Result	Rank
Dadi Denis	400 m	47.57	7	—		did not advance			
Dudley Dorival	110 m hurdles	13.39	1 Q	13.39	2 Q	13.39	5	did not advance	
Moise Joseph	800 m	1:48.15	6	—		did not advance			

Women
Track & road events

Athlete	Event	Heat		Semifinal		Final	
Athlete	Event	Result	Rank	Result	Rank	Result	Rank
Nadine Faustin	100 m hurdles	12.94	3 q	12.74 NR	8	did not advance	

Key

- Note–Ranks given for track events are within the athlete's heat only
- Q = Qualified for the next round
- q = Qualified for the next round as a fastest loser or, in field events, by position without achieving the qualifying target
- NR = National record
- N/A = Round not applicable for the event
- Bye = Athlete not required to compete in round

== Boxing ==
Athlete	Event	Round of 32	Round of 16	Quarterfinals	Semifinals	Final	
Athlete	Event	Opposition Result	Opposition Result	Opposition Result	Opposition Result	Opposition Result	Rank
Andre Berto	Welterweight	Noël (FRA); L 34–36	did not advance				

== Judo ==
Athlete	Event	Round of 32	Round of 16	Quarterfinals	Semifinals	Repechage 1	Repechage 2	Repechage 3	Final / BM	
Athlete	Event	Opposition Result	Opposition Result	Opposition Result	Opposition Result	Opposition Result	Opposition Result	Opposition Result	Opposition Result	Rank
Ernst Laraque	Men's −73 kg	Guilheiro (BRA); L 0000–1001	did not advance							
Joel Brutus	Men's +100 kg	Miran (IRI); L 0001–1002	did not advance			Tataroğlu (TUR); L 0000–1000	did not advance			

== Taekwondo ==
Athlete	Event	Round of 16	Quarterfinals	Semifinals	Repechage 1	Repechage 2	Final / BM	
Athlete	Event	Opposition Result	Opposition Result	Opposition Result	Opposition Result	Opposition Result	Opposition Result	Rank
Tudor Sanon	Men's +80 kg	Moitland (CRC); L 2–3	did not advance					

== See also ==
- Haiti at the 2003 Pan American Games
