= Sabiana Anestor =

Haitian judoka (born 1994)

Personal information
- Nationality: Haitian
- Born: 31 March 1994 (age 31); Trou-du-Nord, Haiti

Sport
- Sport: Judo

Sabiana Anestor (born 31 March 1994) is a Haitian judoka. She competed in the women's half lightweight event at the 2020 Summer Olympics. She served the flag bearer with Darrelle Valsaint at the opening ceremony.

Olympic Games
Preceded by Asnage Castelly	Flag bearer for Haiti; 2020 Tokyo with Darrelle Valsaint	Succeeded by Richardson Viano
