= Haiti at the 2012 Summer Olympics =

- IOC code: HAI
- NOC: Haitian Olympic Committee

in London
- Competitors: 5 in 2 sports
- Flag bearers: Linouse Desravine (opening); Marlena Wesh (closing)
- Medals: Gold 0 Silver 0 Bronze 0 Total 0

Summer Olympics appearances (overview)
- 1900; 1904–1920; 1924; 1928; 1932; 1936; 1948–1956; 1960; 1964–1968; 1972; 1976; 1980; 1984; 1988; 1992; 1996; 2000; 2004; 2008; 2012; 2016; 2020; 2024

Haiti competed at the 2012 Summer Olympics in London, from 27 July to 12 August 2012. This was the nation's 15th appearance at the Olympics, since its national debut at the 1900 Summer Olympics in Paris, France. The Haitian Olympic Committee selected a team of five athletes, three men and two women, to compete only in athletics and judo.

Despite London hosted the Olympics for the third time, this was the first time the Haitian Olympic team has competed in London.

Four Haitian athletes, however, were born in the United States. With hundreds of thousands of people rendered homeless by a devastating earthquake in 2010, Haiti struggled to produce world-class athletes, but those with the nation's links were still eager to represent their ancestors' homeland in numerous sporting events, including the Olympic Games. 21-year-old judoka Linouse Desravine, however, was Haiti's lone homegrown athlete, who later became the nation's flag bearer at the opening ceremony.

Triple jumper Samyr Lainé advanced successfully into the final rounds of his event, but missed out on a medal in London.

== Background ==
Haiti was first represented at the 1900 Summer Olympics in Paris, France. They made sporadic appearances over the next 70 years but began competing regularly following the 1972 Summer Olympics in Munich, West Germany – only missing the 1980 Summer Olympics in Moscow, Russian Soviet Federative Socialist Republic, Soviet Union. The 2012 Summer Olympics in London, England, United Kingdom marked Haiti's 15th appearance at the Summer Olympics.

== Competitors ==
In total, five athletes represented Haiti at the 2012 Summer Olympics in London, England, United Kingdom across two different sports.

Sport	Men	Women	Total
Athletics	3	1	4
Judo	0	1	1
Total	3	2	5

== Athletics ==
In total, four Haitian athletes participated in the athletics events – Moise Joseph in the men's 800 m, Jeffrey Julmis in the men's 110 m hurdles, Samyr Lainé in the men's triple jump and Marlena Wesh in the women's 200 m and the women's 400 m.

Men
Track & road events

Athlete	Event	Heat		Semifinal		Final	
Athlete	Event	Result	Rank	Result	Rank	Result	Rank
Moise Joseph	800 m	1:48.46	6	Did not advance			
Jeffrey Julmis	110 m hurdles	13.87	8	Did not advance			

Field events

Athlete	Event	Qualification		Final	
Athlete	Event	Distance	Position	Distance	Position
Samyr Lainé	Triple jump	16.81	10 q	16.65	11

Women

Athlete	Event	Heat		Semifinal		Final	
Athlete	Event	Result	Rank	Result	Rank	Result	Rank
Marlena Wesh	200 m	DNS		Did not advance			
Marlena Wesh	400 m	51.98	3 Q	52.49	8	Did not advance	

== Judo ==
In total, one Haitian athlete participated in the judo events – Linouse Desravine in the women's −52 kg category.

Athlete	Event	Round of 32	Round of 16	Quarterfinals	Semifinals	Repechage	Final / BM	
Athlete	Event	Opposition Result	Opposition Result	Opposition Result	Opposition Result	Opposition Result	Opposition Result	Rank
Linouse Desravine	Women's −52 kg	Bundmaa (MGL); L 0000–0100	Did not advance					

== See also ==
- Haiti at the 2011 Pan American Games
