= Haiti at the 2022 Winter Olympics =

- IOC code: HAI
- NOC: Haitian Olympic Committee

in Beijing, China 4–20 February 2022
- Competitors: 1 in 1 sport
- Flag bearer (opening): Richardson Viano
- Flag bearer (closing): Richardson Viano
- Medals: Gold 0 Silver 0 Bronze 0 Total 0

Winter Olympics appearances (overview)
- 2022; 2026

Haiti competed at the 2022 Winter Olympics held in Beijing, China, from 4 to 20 February 2022. It marked the nation's first appearance at the Winter Olympics. The Haitian delegation consisted of one male alpine skier, Richardson Viano, who was Haiti's flag bearer for both the opening and closing ceremonies. Viano did not secure a medal in his Olympic debut.

== Background ==
Haiti had never sent a delegation to the Winter Olympics prior to the 2022 Games, but it had participated in the Summer Olympics, debuting at the 1900 Games in Paris, France.

Richardson Viano, the sole competitor for the Haitian team, was born in the Croix-des-Missions neighbourhood of the Haitian capital Port-au-Prince and was adopted from an orphanage at the age of three by a French-Italian couple living near Briançon in the French Alps. His adoptive father was a mountain guide and began teaching Viano how to ski shortly after Viano arrived in France. He began competing internationally during his high school years and hoped to qualify for the French alpine skiing team. However, poor results in 2018 led him to not make the team, and he considered retiring from the sport altogether.

Jean-Pierre Roy, the president of the Haitian Ski Federation, took notice of Viano and contacted him, asking him to compete for his birth country. Viano initially thought he was being pranked by a friend but accepted the offer after researching the federation and meeting with Roy. Viano subsequently received a Haitian passport in 2019 and qualified for the 2022 Games after placing 35th in the men's giant slalom event of the FIS Alpine World Ski Championships 2021, meeting the basic qualification standards.

In addition to being Haiti's first Winter Olympian, Viano was the first Caribbean athlete of colour to compete in alpine skiing at the Olympics. As the only athlete in the Haitian delegation, Viano was selected as the country's flag bearer for both the opening and closing ceremonies.

== Alpine skiing ==
Viano was 19 years old at the time of his Olympic debut. Mackenson Florindo, another Haitian athlete who had been adopted by a family from France, was an emergency substitute for Viano in the case of injury or sickness (particularly due to the ongoing COVID-19 pandemic at the time). Before competing, Viano described it as a "great honour" to represent Haiti and expressed his hope that other Haitians would be inspired to ski.

Viano's first event was the men's giant slalom on 13 February, which he failed to finish. He competed in the men's slalom three days later on 16 February. He placed 42nd in the first run with a time of 1 minute and 2.25 seconds; in the second run, he significantly improved his standing to 33rd with a time of 57.74 seconds. Overall, he finished 34th out of the 45 competitors who completed the race, with a total time of 1 minute and 59.99 seconds.

Athlete	Event	Run 1		Run 2		Total	
Athlete	Event	Time	Rank	Time	Rank	Time	Rank
Richardson Viano	Men's giant slalom	DNF					
Richardson Viano	Men's slalom	1:02.25	42	57.74	33	1:59.99	34

== See also ==
- Haiti at the 2020 Winter Youth Olympics
- Tropical nations at the Winter Olympics
