= Haiti at the 2024 Summer Olympics =

Haiti at the Games of the XXXII Olympiad in Tokyo

- IOC code: HAI
- NOC: Comité Olympique Haïtien

in Paris, France 26 July 2024 – 11 August 2024
- Competitors: 7 (4 men and 3 women) in 5 sports
- Flag bearers (opening): Lynnzee Brown; Philippe Metellus
- Flag bearers (closing): Cédrick Belony-Dulièpre; Emelia Chatfield
- Officials: Fitz-Gérald Fong, head of mission
- Medals: Gold 0 Silver 0 Bronze 0 Total 0

Summer Olympics appearances (overview)
- 1900; 1904–1920; 1924; 1928; 1932; 1936; 1948–1956; 1960; 1964–1968; 1972; 1976; 1980; 1984; 1988; 1992; 1996; 2000; 2004; 2008; 2012; 2016; 2020; 2024

Haiti competed at the 2024 Summer Olympics in Paris from 26 July to 11 August 2024. It was the nation's eighteenth appearance at the Summer Olympics, since its debut in 1900 except for ten occasions, from 1904 through 1920, due to nations poor quality and great depression, from 1948 through 1956, due to nation's poor poverties, from 1964 through 1968, as nations racism, and 1980 as well as part of US led boycott.

== Competitors ==
The following is a list of the number of competitors participating in the Games for Haiti:

Sport	Men	Women	Total
Athletics	1	1	2
Boxing	1	0	1
Gymnastics	0	1	1
Judo	1	0	1
Swimming	1	1	2
Total	4	3	7

All of the athletes are either born or grew up in the United States and Canada.

== Athletics ==
Haitian track and field athletes achieved the entry standards for Paris 2024, either by passing the direct qualifying mark (or time for track and road races) or by world ranking, in the following events (a maximum of 3 athletes each):

Key

- Note–Ranks given for track events are within the athlete's heat only
- Q = Qualified for the next round
- q = Qualified for the next round as the fastest loser or, in field events, by position without achieving the qualifying target
- NR = National record
- N/A = Round not applicable for the event
- Bye = Athlete not required to compete in round

Track and road events

Athlete	Event	Preliminary		Heat		Repechage		Semifinal		Final	
Athlete	Event	Result	Rank	Result	Rank	Result	Rank	Result	Rank	Result	Rank
Christopher Borzor	Men's 100 m	10.26	1 Q	10.28	5	—		Did not advance			
Emelia Chatfield	Women's 100 m hurdles	N/A		13.06	8	13.24	6	Did not advance			

== Boxing ==
Haiti entered one boxer into the Olympic tournament. Cédrick Belony-Dulièpre (men's middleweight) qualified for the games through the allocation of universality spot.

Athlete	Event	Round of 32	Round of 16	Quarterfinals	Semifinals	Final	
Athlete	Event	Opposition Result	Opposition Result	Opposition Result	Opposition Result	Opposition Result	Rank
Cédrick Belony-Dulièpre	Men's 80 kg	Bye	Pereira (BRA); L 0–5	Did not advance			

== Gymnastics ==
=== Artistic ===
Haiti entered one gymnast to compete at Paris 2024. Lynnzee Brown obtained one quotas for the nations after receiving the Tripartite Commission invitations, marking the country's debut in the sport.

Women

Athlete	Event	Qualification						Final					
Athlete	Event	Apparatus				Total	Rank	Apparatus				Total	Rank
Athlete	Event	V	UB	BB	F	Total	Rank	V	UB	BB	F	Total	Rank
Lynnzee Brown	All-around	13.566	11.5	11.533	12.233	48.832	53	Did not advance					

== Judo ==
Haiti qualified one judoka. Philippe Metellus revied a continental quota as the nation's top-ranked judoka outside of a direct qualifying position in the IJF World Ranking List.

Athlete	Event	Round of 32	Round of 16	Quarterfinals	Semifinals	Repechage	Final / BM	
Athlete	Event	Opposition Result	Opposition Result	Opposition Result	Opposition Result	Opposition Result	Opposition Result	Rank
Philippe Metellus	Men's 73 kg	Terada (THA); L 0–11	Did not advance					

== Swimming ==
Haiti sent two swimmers to compete at the 2024 Paris Olympics.

Athlete	Event	Heat		Semifinal		Final	
Athlete	Event	Time	Rank	Time	Rank	Time	Rank
Alexandre Grand'Pierre	Men's 100 m breaststroke	1:02.85	28	Did not advance			
Mayah Chouloute	Women's 50 m freestyle	29.78	59	Did not advance			

Qualifiers for the latter rounds (Q) of all events were decided on a time only basis, therefore positions shown are overall results versus competitors in all heats.

== See also ==
- Haiti at the 2023 Pan American Games
