= Philippe Metellus =

Haitian Canadian judoka

Personal information
- Born: 30 May 1990 (age 34); Montreal, Canada
- Occupation: Judoka

Sport
- Country: Haiti
- Sport: Judo
- Weight class: ‍–‍73 kg
- Club: Kiseki Judo
- Coached by: Ernst Laraque

Achievements and titles
- Olympic Games: R32 (2024)
- World Champ.: R32 (2021)
- Pan American Champ.: 5th (2021)

Profile at external databases
- IJF: 37919
- JudoInside.com: 114231
- Updated on 29 July 2024

Philippe Abel Metellus (born 30 May 1990) is a Haitian Canadian judoka who was the flagbearer for Haiti at the 2024 Summer Olympics in Paris, France.

== Biography ==
Philippe Metellus was born in 1990 in Montreal, Canada. He began training in judo in 2002 in Haiti, where he spent his childhood, and continued training after returning to Canada. He trained at the Kiseki Judo club in Montreal, where his coach is the former Olympic judoka Ernst Laraque. Metellus competed in his first international competition at the 2011 Summer Universiade in Shenzhen. He is a seven-time Haitian national champion and a two-time Canadian national champion.

At the Paris Olympics, Metellus competed in the men's 73 kg category and was defeated in his first match by Masayuki Terada of Thailand, who scored an ippon by tani otoshi.

Olympic Games
Preceded by Richardson Viano	Flag bearer for Haiti; Paris 2024 with Lynnzee Brown	Succeeded by Incumbent
