= Haiti at the 1992 Summer Olympics =

- IOC code: HAI
- NOC: Comité Olympique Haïtien

in Barcelona
- Competitors: 7 in 2 sports
- Medals: Gold 0 Silver 0 Bronze 0 Total 0

Summer Olympics appearances (overview)
- 1900; 1904–1920; 1924; 1928; 1932; 1936; 1948–1956; 1960; 1964–1968; 1972; 1976; 1980; 1984; 1988; 1992; 1996; 2000; 2004; 2008; 2012; 2016; 2020; 2024

Haiti competed at the 1992 Summer Olympics in Barcelona, Spain.

== Competitors ==
The following is the list of number of competitors in the Games.

Sport	Men	Women	Total
Athletics	2	0	2
Judo	5	0	5
Total	7	0	7

== Results by event ==
=== Athletics ===
Men's 100 metres

- Claude Roumain

- Round 1 — 11.07 seconds (→ did not advance)

Men's 200 metres

- Claude Roumain

- Round 1 — 22.51 seconds (→ did not advance)

Men's Marathon

- Dieudonné Lamothe — 2:36:11 (→ 76th place)

=== Judo ===
Men's Half-Lightweight (– 65 kg)

- Caleb Jean

- Round 1 — Defeated Joseph Momanyi of Kenya
- Round 2 — Lost to Dambiinyam Maralgerel of Mongolia (→ did not advance)

Men's Lightweight (– 71 kg)

- Rubens Joseph

- Round 1 — Bye
- Round 2 — Lost to Massimo Sulli of Italy (→ did not advance)

Men's Half-Middleweight (– 78 kg)

- Jean Alix Holmand

- Round 1 — Bye
- Round 2 — Lost to Byung-Joo Kim of South Korea (→ did not advance)

Men's Middleweight (– 86 kg)

- Hermate Souffrant

- Round 1 — Bye
- Round 2 — Lost to Densign Emmanuel White of the United Kingdom (→ did not advance)

Men's Half-Heavyweight (– 95 kg)

- Parnel Legros

- Round 1 — Bye
- Round 2 — Lost to Radu Ivan of Romania (→ did not advance)

== See also ==
- Haiti at the 1991 Pan American Games
