= Lynnzee Brown =

Haitian-American artistic gymnast and gymnastics coach

- Full name: Lynnzee Ellise Brown
- Born: September 4, 1998 (age 28) Independence, Missouri, U.S.
- Height: 5 ft 2 in (157 cm)

Gymnastics career
- Discipline: Women's artistic gymnastics
- Country represented: Haiti; (2023–present)
- College team: Denver Pioneers (2018–23)
- Training location: University Park, Pennsylvania, United States
- Club: Great American Gymnastics Express
- Head coach: Sarah Shire Brown
- Former coaches: Al Fong; Armine Barutyan-Fong
Medal record
Representing Denver Pioneers
NCAA Championships
| Gold medal – first place | 2019 Fort Worth | Floor exercise |
| Silver medal – second place | 2023 Fort Worth | Vault |

Lynnzee Ellise Brown (born September 9, 1998) is a Haitian-American artistic gymnast and gymnastics coach. Following a successful Level 10 career, she attended the University of Denver on a full-ride scholarship, representing the Denver Pioneers gymnastics team from 2018 to 2023. During her six-year collegiate career, she was the 2019 NCAA floor exercise co-champion, the 2023 NCAA vault co-silver medalist, a four-time Big 12 Conference champion, a 2021 Honda Sports Award and 2023 Honda Inspiration Award finalist.

Brown began representing Haiti internationally in 2023 following her graduation from Denver. Her international debut came at the 2023 Pan American Artistic Gymnastics Championships where she placed 15th in the all-around. She then qualified to the 2023 World Artistic Gymnastics Championships, placing 82nd. In May 2024, she received a universality spot from the Tripartite Commission and represented Haiti at the 2024 Summer Olympics.

== Gymnastics career ==
=== 2011–17: Level 10 ===
Brown became a Level 10 gymnast in 2011, aged 12. During her career, she qualified to J.O. Nationals five times between 2012 and 2017. Her best all-around placement was second in the Senior F division in 2017 behind Nia Dennis. Brown also qualified for her first and only Nastia Liukin Cup during the 2017 season, placing eighth all-around in the Senior division.

Prior to this, she committed to the University of Denver and its women's gymnastics program in September 2014.

=== 2023-2024 ===
Representing Haiti at the 2024 Summer Olympics, Brown finished 53rd in the all-around, placing 74th on uneven bars, 70th on balance beam, and 64th on floor exercise.

== Personal life ==
Brown graduated from the University of Denver in 2021 with a bachelor's degree in media studies and later received her master's degree in communication management from the school in 2023.

In July 2023, she became an assistant coach for the Penn State Nittany Lions women's gymnastics team for the 2023–24 season.

Brown's mother, Tamela Brown, died in 2019.

Olympic Games
| Preceded by Richardson Viano | Flag bearer for Haiti; Paris 2024 with Philippe Metellus | Succeeded by Incumbent |
