= Haiti at the Olympics =

- IOC code: HAI
- NOC: Comité Olympique Haïtien
- Medals Ranked 134th: Gold 0 Silver 1 Bronze 1 Total 2

Summer appearances
- 1900; 1904–1920; 1924; 1928; 1932; 1936; 1948–1956; 1960; 1964–1968; 1972; 1976; 1980; 1984; 1988; 1992; 1996; 2000; 2004; 2008; 2012; 2016; 2020; 2024

Winter appearances
- 2022; 2026

Haiti made its first appearance at the Olympic Games in the 1900 Summer Olympics in Paris. The 1924 Summer Olympics in the same city marked Haiti's first Olympic medal, when the seven members of Haiti's shooting team took third place in the free rifle competition. The next games, in 1928, saw another medal for Haiti; Silvio Cator took the silver in men's long jump. While Haiti has participated in several Olympic games since 1928, no other medals have been won. The nation made its debut at the Winter Olympic Games in 2022.

== Medal tables ==
=== Medals by Summer Games ===
Games	Athletes	Gold	Silver	Bronze	Total	Rank
(France) 1900 Paris	3	0	0	0	0	–
1904–1920	did not participate					
(France) 1924 Paris	9	0	0	1	1	23
(Netherlands) 1928 Amsterdam	2	0	1	0	1	30
(United States) 1932 Los Angeles	2	0	0	0	0	–
1936–1956	did not participate					
(Italy) 1960 Rome	1	0	0	0	0	–
(Japan) 1964 Tokyo	did not participate					
1968 Mexico City	did not participate					
(West Germany) 1972 Munich	7	0	0	0	0	–
(Canada) 1976 Montreal	13	0	0	0	0	–
(Soviet Union) 1980 Moscow	did not participate					
(United States) 1984 Los Angeles	4	0	0	0	0	–
(South Korea) 1988 Seoul	4	0	0	0	0	–
(Spain) 1992 Barcelona	7	0	0	0	0	–
(United States) 1996 Atlanta	7	0	0	0	0	–
(Australia) 2000 Sydney	5	0	0	0	0	–
(Greece) 2004 Athens	8	0	0	0	0	–
(China) 2008 Beijing	7	0	0	0	0	–
(United Kingdom) 2012 London	5	0	0	0	0	–
(Brazil) 2016 Rio de Janeiro	10	0	0	0	0	–
(Japan) 2020 Tokyo	6	0	0	0	0	–
(France) 2024 Paris	7	0	0	0	0	–
(United States) 2028 Los Angeles	future event					
(Australia) 2032 Brisbane	future event					
Total		0	1	1	2	134

=== Medals by Winter Games ===
Games	Athletes	Gold	Silver	Bronze	Total	Rank
(China) 2022 Beijing	1	0	0	0	0	–
(Italy) 2026 Milano Cortina	2	0	0	0	0	–
(France) 2030 French Alps	future event					
(United States) 2034 Utah	future event					
Total		0	0	0	0	–

=== Medals by summer sport ===
Sport	Gold	Silver	Bronze	Total
Athletics	0	1	0	1
Shooting	0	0	1	1
Totals (2 entries)	0	1	1	2

== History by sport ==
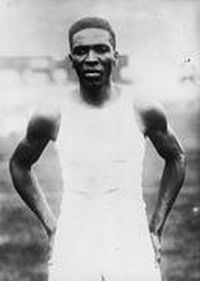
Silvio Cator, 1928 silver medalist

Athletics
Year	Athletes	Events	Entries	Medals			
Year	Athletes	Events	Entries	Gold	Silver	Bronze	Total
1924	3	6	6	0	0	0	0
1928	2	3	3	0	1	0	1
1932	2	2	2	0	0	0	0
1972	7	7	7	0	0	0	0
1976	10	11	11	0	0	0	0
1984	1	1	1	0	0	0	0
1988	3	4	4	0	0	0	0
1992	2	3	3	0	0	0	0
1996	3	3	3	0	0	0	0
2000	3	3	3	0	0	0	0

Boxing
Year	Boxers	Events	Entries	Medals			
Year	Boxers	Events	Entries	Gold	Silver	Bronze	Total
1976	3	3	3	0	0	0	0

Fencing
Year	Fencers	Events	Entries	Medals			
Year	Fencers	Events	Entries	Gold	Silver	Bronze	Total
1900	2	3	2	0	0	0	0
1984	2	1	2	0	0	0	0

Judo
Year	Judoka	Events	Entries	Medals			
Year	Judoka	Events	Entries	Gold	Silver	Bronze	Total
1992	5	5	5	0	0	0	0
1996	2	2	2	0	0	0	0
2000	1	1	1	0	0	0	0

Shooting
Year	Shooters	Events	Entries	Medals			
Year	Shooters	Events	Entries	Gold	Silver	Bronze	Total
1924	5	2	5	0	0	1	1

Swimming
Year	Swimmers	Events	Entries	Medals			
Year	Swimmers	Events	Entries	Gold	Silver	Bronze	Total
1996	1	1	1	0	0	0	0

Tennis
Year	Tennis players	Events	Entries	Medals			
Year	Tennis players	Events	Entries	Gold	Silver	Bronze	Total
1984	1	1	1	0	0	0	0
1988	1	1	1	0	0	0	0
1996	1	1	1	0	0	0	0
2000	1	1	1	0	0	0	0

Weightlifting
Year	Weightlifters	Events	Entries	Medals			
Year	Weightlifters	Events	Entries	Gold	Silver	Bronze	Total
1936^{†}	1	0	0	0	0	0	0
1960	1	1	1	0	0	0	0

^{†}Haiti had one weightlifter entered in the 1936 Olympics, but he did not compete.

== List of medalists ==
Medal	Name	Games	Sport	Event
Bronze	Ludovic Augustin; Eloi Metullus; Destin Destine; Astrel Rolland; Ludovic Valborge	1924 Paris	Shooting	Men's team free rifle
Silver	Silvio Cator	1928 Amsterdam	Athletics	Men's long jump

== Summary by sport ==
=== Fencing ===
Haiti's Olympic debut in 1900 consisted of two fencers. Through the 2016 Games, the nation has not won any medals in the sport.

Games	Fencers	Events	Gold	Silver	Bronze	Total
1900 Paris	2	3/7	0	0	0	0
Total			0	0	0	0

== See also ==
- List of flag bearers for Haiti at the Olympics
- Haiti at the Paralympics
- Tropical nations at the Winter Olympics
