= Cherry Tree Marathon =

Marathon in New York City, US, 1959–1972

The Cherry Tree Marathon was a marathon first held on February 22, 1959, in the Bronx. It was the first marathon held by New York Road Runners, then called the Road Runners Club–New York Association (RRC–NYA). In a field of twelve competitors, club president Ted Corbitt won with a time of 2:38:57. The race was held in the Bronx annually through 1970, beginning and ending in Macombs Dam Park, near Yankee Stadium, and consisting of trips up Sedgwick Avenue and back, along the Harlem River.

In 1971, the marathon was held in Central Park, when it was called the Earth Day Marathon, and again in 1972, when it was run for the last time.

It is considered the predecessor to the New York City Marathon and is also a predecessor to the Long Island Marathon, which was called the Earth Day Marathon when it was first run in Nassau County in 1973.

== History ==
The Cherry Tree Marathon was one of seven events organized by the RRC–NYA in its first year.

Alex Breckenridge’s speedy finish in the second Cherry Tree Marathon prompted the question, “Is it a full length course?” In June 1960 it was determined that the course had been 25.4 miles, and club members voted to extend the course to the standard marathon distance, 26 miles, 385 yards.

Women participated in the marathon in its later years. In spring 1970, the RRC–NYA newsletter noted that two women started in the Cherry Tree Marathon and that “one a Mrs. Kuscik [sic], looked good and appears capable of cracking 3 hours.” In 1971, four women started in an overall field of 241, and Nina Kuscsik finished first among the women, with a time of 3:11:41. In 1972, she was again the top woman, with a time of 2:59:33, becoming the first woman to twice finish a marathon in under three hours.

Winners
Date	Athlete	Time
February 22, 1959	Ted Corbitt	2:38:57
February 21, 1960	Alex Breckenridge	2:21:39
February 19, 1961	John J. Kelley	2:25:27
February 25, 1962	John J. Kelley	2:29:55
February 24, 1963	Adolph Gruber	2:37:40
February 23, 1964	George Foulds	2:25:25
February 22, 1965	Tom McCarthy	2:29:33.6
February 13, 1966	Bob Scharf	2:21:41.5
February 26, 1967	John Garlepp	2:35:38
February 25, 1968	Moses Mayfield	2:35
March 16, 1969	Gary Muhrcke	2:29:24
March 15, 1970	Herb Lorenz	2:28
March 21, 1971	Thomas Fleming	2:23:44.2
March 19, 1972	Tom Hollander	2:23:17.6
