= Linouse Desravine =

Haitian judoka (born 1991)

Personal information
- Nationality: Haiti
- Born: 10 February 1991 (age 35) Cap-Haïtien, Haiti
- Occupation: Judoka
- Height: 160 cm (5 ft 3 in)
- Weight: 52 kg (115 lb)

Sport
- Sport: Judo
Medal record
Women's Judo
Representing Haiti
Central American and Caribbean Games
Bronze medal – third place	2010 Mayagüez	-48 kg
Bronze medal – third place	2014 Vera Cruz	-52 kg
Pan American Judo Championships
Silver medal – second place	2011 Guadalajara	-52 kg

Profile at external databases
- IJF: 17866, 3298
- JudoInside.com: 69585
- Updated on 16 September 2012

Linouse Desravine (born 10 February 1991 in Cap-Haïtien) is a Haitian judoka who competes in the women's 52 kg category. (Note: "Linouse Desravine". London 2012. The London Organising Committee of the Olympic Games and Paralympic Games Limited.) At the 2012 Summer Olympics, she was Haiti's flag bearer, but she was defeated in the first round of her event.

She had previous won medals at the Central American and Caribbean Games and the Pan American Judo Championships. She also later won another bronze at the Central American and Caribbean Games in 2014.

Olympic Games
Preceded by Joel Brutis	Flagbearer for Haiti; London 2012	Succeeded by Asnage Castelly
