= Charles Olemus =

Haitian former track and field athlete (born 1947)

Charles Olmeus (born February 16, 1947) is a Haitian former long-distance runner who competed at the 1976 Olympic Games in Montreal.

Olemus competed at 10000 metres, and completed his qualifying heat in 42:00.11. He finished 14 minutes behind the heat winner Carlos Lopes of Portugal and 8.5 minutes behind Chris McCubbins of Canada who finished next to last. While he completed the last six laps alone on the track, officials argued whether he should be allowed to finish the course. Ultimately he was, which held up the entire track and field schedule by fourteen minutes.

Olemus was one of the members of the notorious squad of Haitian long-distance track and field athletes delegated to the Olympic Games by the Baby Doc Duvalier regime during the 1970s and 1980s, who gained fame by setting all-time worst times on the Olympics, many of which are still standing today. Other notable performers included Anilus Joseph who started his 1972 10000 metres qualifying heat in a sprint then dropped out when he was already a mile behind the leaders, Wilnor Joseph who covered the 800 metres with a time of 2:15.26 in 1976, and Dieudonne Lamothe who finished last at both the 5000 metres in 1976 and at the marathon race in 1984.

== See also ==
Olympian marathoners made famous by finishing last:

- John Stephen Akhwari
- Luvsanlkhündegiin Otgonbayar
- Pyambuugiin Tuul
- Abdul Baser Wasiqi
