= Haiti at the 1996 Summer Olympics =

- IOC code: HAI
- NOC: Comité Olympique Haïtien

in Atlanta
- Competitors: 7 in 4 sports
- Flag bearer: Adler Volmar
- Medals: Gold 0 Silver 0 Bronze 0 Total 0

Summer Olympics appearances (overview)
- 1900; 1904–1920; 1924; 1928; 1932; 1936; 1948–1956; 1960; 1964–1968; 1972; 1976; 1980; 1984; 1988; 1992; 1996; 2000; 2004; 2008; 2012; 2016; 2020; 2024

Haiti competed at the 1996 Summer Olympics in Atlanta, United States. The Haitian team consisted of seven competitors: three track and field athletes, two judoka, one swimmer and one tennis player.

== Competitors ==
The following is the list of number of competitors in the Games.

Sport	Men	Women	Total
Athletics	3	0	3
Judo	2	0	2
Swimming	1	0	1
Tennis	1	0	1
Total	7	0	7

== Athletics ==
Key

- Note–Ranks given for track events are within the athlete's heat only
- Q = Qualified for the next round
- q = Qualified for the next round as a fastest loser or, in field events, by position without achieving the qualifying target

Men

Track & road events

Athlete	Event	Heat		Quarterfinal		Semifinal		Final	
Athlete	Event	Time	Rank	Time	Rank	Time	Rank	Time	Rank
Anderson Vilien	200 m	21.62	6	did not advance					
Jean Destine	800 m	1:48.82	5	—N/a		did not advance			
Wagner Marseille	110 m hurdles	13.95	6	did not advance					

== Judo ==
Men

Athlete	Event	Round of 64	Round of 32	Round of 16	Quarterfinal	Semifinal	Repechage 1	Repechage 2	Repechage 3	Final / BM	
Athlete	Event	Opposition Result	Opposition Result	Opposition Result	Opposition Result	Opposition Result	Opposition Result	Opposition Result	Opposition Result	Opposition Result	Rank
Adler Volmar	–78 kg	Bye	Canto (BRA); L	did not advance							
Somoza Celestin	–86 kg	Bye	Bagdasarov (KAZ); W	Canto (BRA); L	did not advance		Maltsev (RUS); L	did not advance			

== Swimming ==
Men

Athlete	Event	Heat		Final	
Athlete	Event	Time	Rank	Time	Rank
Alain Sergile	1000 m butterfly	58.23	56	did not advance	

== Tennis ==
Athlete	Event	Round of 64	Round of 32	Round of 16	Quarterfinal	Semifinal	Final / BM	
Athlete	Event	Opposition Result	Opposition Result	Opposition Result	Opposition Result	Opposition Result	Opposition Result	Rank
Ronald Agénor	Men's Singles	Gustafsson (SWE); L 2–6, 4–6	did not advance					

== See also ==
- Haiti at the 1995 Pan American Games
