= Anilus Joseph =

Haitian track and field athlete

Personal information
- Nationality: Haitian
- Born: January 21, 1945 (age 80)

Sport
- Country: Haiti
- Sport: Track and field
- Event: 10,000m
- Updated on 20 December 2014

Anilus Joseph (born January 21, 1945) was a Haitian track and field athlete who competed at the 1972 Olympic Games in Munich.

Joseph was running his first ever 10000 metres at the Olympics and started off with a quick pace, covering the first lap in 59.6 secs. By the eighth lap he was passed by all the others and by the 12th he was passed for a second time. When the bell rang for the leaders, Joseph broke into a sprint again, but when he was told by a track official that he still had a mile to go, he retired from the race.

Joseph was one of the first representatives from the notorious squad of Haitian long distance track and field athletes delegated to the Olympic Games by the Baby Doc Duvalier regime during the 1970s and 1980s, who gained fame by setting all-time worst times on the Olympics, many of which are still standing today. Later notable performers included Wilnor Joseph who covered the 800 metres with a time of 2:15.26 in 1976, Charles Olemus who blocked the complete track and field schedule in 1976 for 15 minutes until he covered the last six laps of his 10000 metres race, and Dieudonné LaMothe who finished last at both the 5000 metres in 1976 and at the marathon race in 1984.
