= Haiti at the 1900 Summer Olympics =

- IOC code: HAI
- NOC: Comité Olympique Haïtien

in Paris
- Competitors: 3 in 2 sports
- Medals: Gold 0 Silver 0 Bronze 0 Total 0

Summer Olympics appearances (overview)
- 1900; 1904–1920; 1924; 1928; 1932; 1936; 1948–1956; 1960; 1964–1968; 1972; 1976; 1980; 1984; 1988; 1992; 1996; 2000; 2004; 2008; 2012; 2016; 2020; 2024

Two fencers and one rugby player of Haitian nationality competed at the 1900 Summer Olympics in Paris for Haiti. It would not be until the 1924 Summer Olympics until the nation sent a team to compete at the Olympic Games.

== Fencing ==
Neither Haitian fencer advanced past the first round.

Athlete	Event	Round 1	Quarterfinal	Semifinal	Final
André Corvington	Men's foil	Not advanced by jury	did not advance		
Léon Thiércelin	Men's masters foil	Not advanced by jury	did not advance		
Léon Thiércelin	Men's masters épée	Unknown	did not advance		

== Rugby ==
Constantin Henriquez took part in a Rugby tournament as part of a Mixed team and won a Gold medal with this team.
