= Haiti at the 1984 Summer Olympics =

- IOC code: HAI
- NOC: Comité Olympique Haïtien

in Los Angeles
- Competitors: 4 in 3 sports
- Flag bearer: Ronald Agénor
- Medals: Gold 0 Silver 0 Bronze 0 Total 0

Summer Olympics appearances (overview)
- 1900; 1904–1920; 1924; 1928; 1932; 1936; 1948–1956; 1960; 1964–1968; 1972; 1976; 1980; 1984; 1988; 1992; 1996; 2000; 2004; 2008; 2012; 2016; 2020; 2024

Haiti competed at the 1984 Summer Olympics in Los Angeles, United States. The nation returned to the Olympic Games after participating in the American-led boycott of the 1980 Summer Olympics. Haiti's delegation consisted of two officials and four competitors (one track and field athlete, two fencers, and one tennis player).

== Athletics ==
Men's Marathon

- Dieudonné LaMothe — 2:52:18 (→ 78th place, last finisher)

== Fencing ==
Women's foil

- Gina Faustin

- Round 1 — Won 2 out of 6 matches (→ did not advance)

- Sheila Viard

- Round 1 — Won 0 out of 6 matches (→ did not advance)

== Tennis ==
Men's singles

- Ronald Agénor

- Round 1 — Lost to Stefan Edberg of Sweden (→ did not advance) Note: Edberg went on to take 1st place
