= Ange Jean Baptiste =

Haitian judoka (born 1984)

Medal record

Women's judo

Representing Haiti

Central American and Caribbean Games
Silver medal – second place	2006 Cartagena	-57 kg

Ange Mercie Jean Baptiste (born 24 September 1984) is a Haitian judoka who has participated internationally for Haiti. She won the silver medal at the Judo competitions of the 2006 Central American and Caribbean Games. She was one of seven athletes who represented Haiti at the 2008 Summer Olympics in Beijing. A photograph of Baptiste in her match against Yurisleydis Lupetey of Cuba in Beijing, which depicted a drop of blood falling from Baptiste's forehead and hitting the ground during the match, won an award at the World Press Photo Contest in 2009.
