= Haiti at the 1936 Summer Olympics =

- IOC code: HAI
- NOC: Comité Olympique Haïtien

in Berlin
- Competitors: 1 in 1 sport
- Flag bearer: René A. Ambroise
- Medals: Gold 0 Silver 0 Bronze 0 Total 0

Summer Olympics appearances (overview)
- 1900; 1904–1920; 1924; 1928; 1932; 1936; 1948–1956; 1960; 1964–1968; 1972; 1976; 1980; 1984; 1988; 1992; 1996; 2000; 2004; 2008; 2012; 2016; 2020; 2024

Haiti was set to participate at the 1936 Summer Olympics in Berlin, Germany, but its only athlete, weightlifter René Ambroise, pulled out due to injury. In the days before the Games began, the Liechtenstein delegation noticed that its national flag was identical to that of Haiti, resulting in both altering the flags for the opening ceremony and, in 1937, Liechtenstein changing its flag.

== Organisation ==
André Chevallier was the president of Haiti's National Olympic Committee in 1936 and lead the nation through the organisation process. The nation had been invited to participate on 20 December 1933, and were sent ten Olympic programmes in March 1935, though in Spanish rather than national language French. Their small delegation (twenty Olympic identity cards and one press ticket were issued) arrived in Germany on 24 July 1936 before departing on 4 August. Their attaché in Berlin was Edouard Voigt, and the military officer assigned to serve them was Captain v. Hülsen.

In order to travel to Germany, the Haitian delegation first had to go to New York to catch an Atlantic crossing with the US Armed Forces on the SS Manhattan, barely arriving in New York in time.

== Flag incident ==
Haiti's only athlete in 1936 was weightlifter René A. Ambroise (from Jacmel), a student based in Paris, where he had taken up the sport. He carried the Haitian flag at the opening ceremony; having discovered that the civil flag of Haiti was identical to that of Liechtenstein when the latter delegation arrived at the Games, both nations decided to carry different flags in the opening ceremony. Liechtenstein received approval from their government to carry their flag upside-down and add a "Prince's Hat" crown in the corner, while Ambroise added the national crest to his flag (to make it the state flag). As a nation, Liechtenstein then changed its flag in 1937.

On the day of the opening ceremony, The New Yorker ran an Olympic cover which featured the Haitian state flag, including the crest. Stamps issued in Haiti in 1939 which represented the Olympics used the civil flag, without a crest.

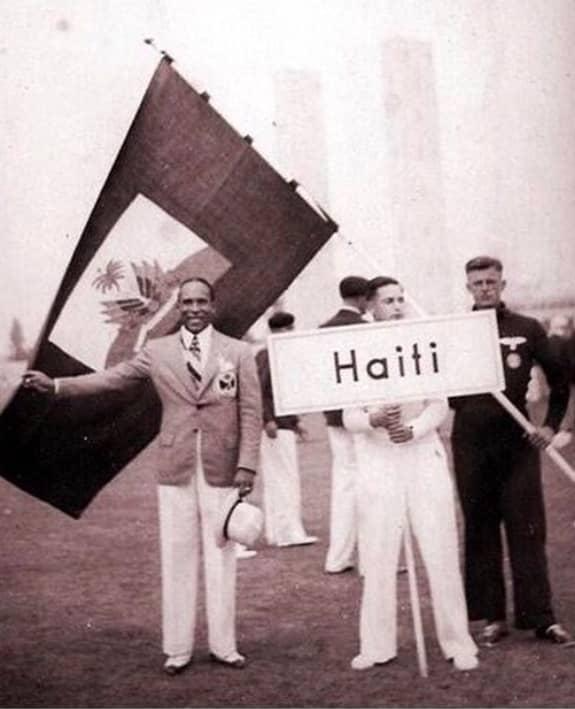
Ambroise with the Haitian flag before the opening ceremony

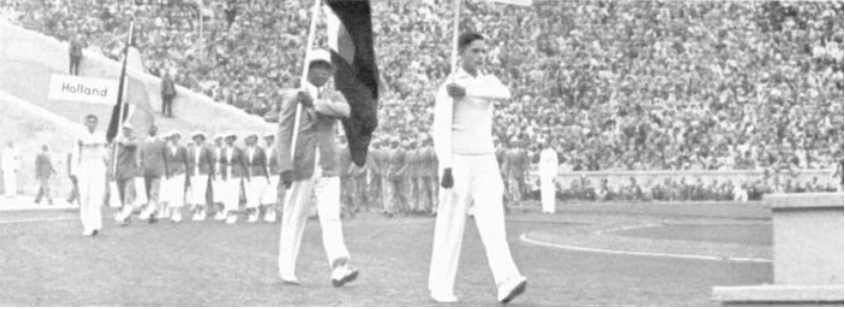
Haiti in the Parade of Nations

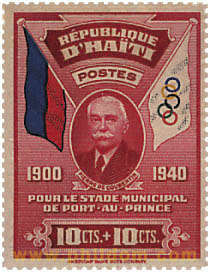
1939 Olympic-themed stamp depicting the civil flag of Haiti

== Weightlifting ==
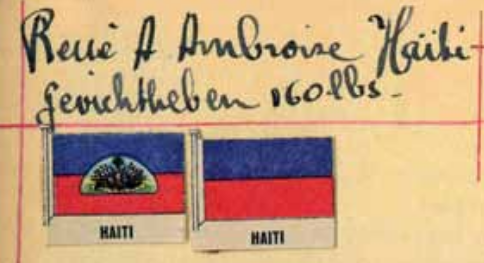
Ambroise was entered with a body weight of 160 pounds (73 kg).

Ambroise was set to compete in the middleweight weightlifting event, but he injured himself in training the day after the opening ceremony and had to pull out. The injury was a severe muscle tear in his right leg, bad enough to require hospitalisation and prevent Ambroise from even watching the Games. When he was interviewed while injured, he said that he believed he was given the pain for unwittingly being a disappointment to his country.

Ambroise had not been hopeful of his chances; speaking to The New Yorker in July 1936, he said that he struggled to lift as much as men lighter than himself and had the bad habit of using his elbows, reflecting that he did not have the time to improve his form to an Olympic level.
