= Haiti at the 2026 Winter Olympics =

- IOC code: HAI
- NOC: Haitian Olympic Committee

in Milan and Cortina d'Ampezzo, Italy 6–22 February 2026
- Competitors: 2 (2 men and 0 women) in 2 sports
- Flag bearer (opening): Stevenson Savart
- Flag bearer (closing): Richardson Viano
- Medals: Gold 0 Silver 0 Bronze 0 Total 0

Winter Olympics appearances (overview)
- 2022; 2026

Haiti competed at the 2026 Winter Olympics held in Milan and Cortina d'Ampezzo, Italy, from 6 to 22 February 2026. It was the nation's second appearance at the Winter Olympics, having made its debut at the 2022 Games in Beijing. The Haitian delegation consisted of two male athletes competing in two sports: returning alpine skier Richardson Viano and debuting cross-country skier Stevenson Savart. Savart and Viano were their country's flagbearer in the opening and closing ceremonies, respectively. Haiti did not win any medals at the Games.

== Background ==
The Haitian Olympic Committee (French: Comité olympique haïtien) was recognized by the International Olympic Committee (IOC) in 1924. However, Haiti had made its Olympic debut at the 1900 Summer Olympics in Paris, France, and later earned its first medal, a bronze in the men's team free rifle, at the 1924 Summer Olympics in the same city. The nation did not make an appearance at the Winter Olympics until the 2022 Games in Beijing, where it was represented by Richardson Viano in alpine skiing. The 2026 Winter Olympics marked Haiti's second appearance at the Winter Olympics.

The 2026 Winter Olympics were held in Milan and Cortina d'Ampezzo, Italy, from 6 to 22 February 2026. Cross-country skier Stevenson Savart was named as the Haitian flagbearer during the opening ceremony, while Viano returned as the flagbearer for the closing ceremony.

The team introduced a new uniform designed by Italian-Haitian designer Stella Jean and based on a painting by Haitian artist Edouard Duval-Carrié. The original design included Haitian revolutionary leader Toussaint Louverture on a red horse, but the IOC mandated the removal of Louverture, citing guidelines on neutrality.

== Competitors ==
The Haitian team consisted of two male athletes competing in two sports. Haiti did not win a medal at the Games.

Sport	Men	Women	Total
Alpine skiing	1	0	1
Cross-country skiing	1	0	1
Total	2	0	2

== Alpine skiing ==
The basic qualification mark for the slalom and giant slalom events was based on a points system established by the International Ski Federation (FIS). It stipulated an average of less than 120 points on a list that took into account results from 1 July 2024 to 18 January 2026. The quotas were allocated further based on athletes satisfying other criteria related to their results, with a maximum of 22 athletes (11 male and 11 female athletes) from a single participating National Olympic Committee. Haiti qualified one male alpine skier for the men's slalom and men's giant slalom events through the basic quota. Richardson Viano represented the country in both events, as he did in the 2022 Games, in which he failed to finish the giant slalom event and placed 34th out of the 45 competitors in the slalom event.

The alpine skiing events were held at the Stelvio Ski Centre in Bormio, in the Province of Sondrio. In the giant slalom event held on 14 February, Viano completed his first run in 1:24.55, ranking 47th among the competitors. He ranked 47th in his second run with a time of 1:18.28, finishing 44th overall out of the 80 participants with a combined time of 2:42.83. In the slalom event on 16 February, Viano posted a first-run time of 1:04.31 to rank 29th, followed by a second run of 1:03.49 ranking 30th, finishing 29th overall with a combined time of 2:07.80.

Athlete	Event	Run 1		Run 2		Total	
Athlete	Event	Time	Rank	Time	Rank	Time	Rank
Richardson Viano	Men's giant slalom	1:24.55	47	1:18.28	47	2:42.83	44
Richardson Viano	Men's slalom	1:04.31	29	1:03.49	30	2:07.80	29

== Cross-country skiing ==
As per the FIS and its pointing system, an athlete with less than 150 points on a list published on 19 January 2026 was eligible to qualify for the distance or sprint events of cross-country skiing. If the initial standard was not met, and quotas were still available, an athlete with less than 350 distance points was eligible to enter the respective distance or sprint events. A maximum of 16 athletes per nation were allowed to compete with a maximum of 8 per gender.

Haiti qualified one male cross-country skier through the basic quota. Stevenson Savart, Haiti's first Olympic cross-country skier, represented the country in the sport. Savart competed in four events (in chronological order): the men's skiathlon, the men's sprint, the men's 10km freestyle, and the men's 50 km classical.

The cross-country skiing events were held at the Tesero Cross-Country Skiing Stadium in Trentino-Alto Adige. In the men's skiathlon held on 8 February, he completed the classical portion in 27:29.7 (65th) and the freestyle portion in 28:44.8 (64th), for a combined time of 56:52.8 and an overall rank of 64th. In the men's sprint on 10 February, he recorded a qualification time of 3:40.92 and ranked 82nd out of the 94 participants, failing to advance to the quarterfinals. In the men's 10km freestyle on 13 February, Savart was ranked 79th out of the 113 participants with a time of 24:59.4. He did not finish the men's 50 km classical event on 21 February.

Distance
Athlete	Event	Classical		Freestyle		Total	
Athlete	Event	Time	Rank	Time	Rank	Time	Rank
Stevenson Savart	Men's 10km freestyle	—N/a		24:59.4	79	—N/a	
Stevenson Savart	Men's skiathlon	27:29.7	65	28:44.8	64	56:52.8	64
Stevenson Savart	Men's 50 km classical	DNF		—N/a			

Sprint
Athlete	Event	Qualification		Quarterfinal		Semifinal		Final	
Athlete	Event	Time	Rank	Time	Rank	Time	Rank	Time	Rank
Stevenson Savart	Men's sprint	3:40.92	82	Did not advance					

== See also ==
- Tropical nations at the Winter Olympics
