= André Théard =

Haitian sprinter

Valéry Théard
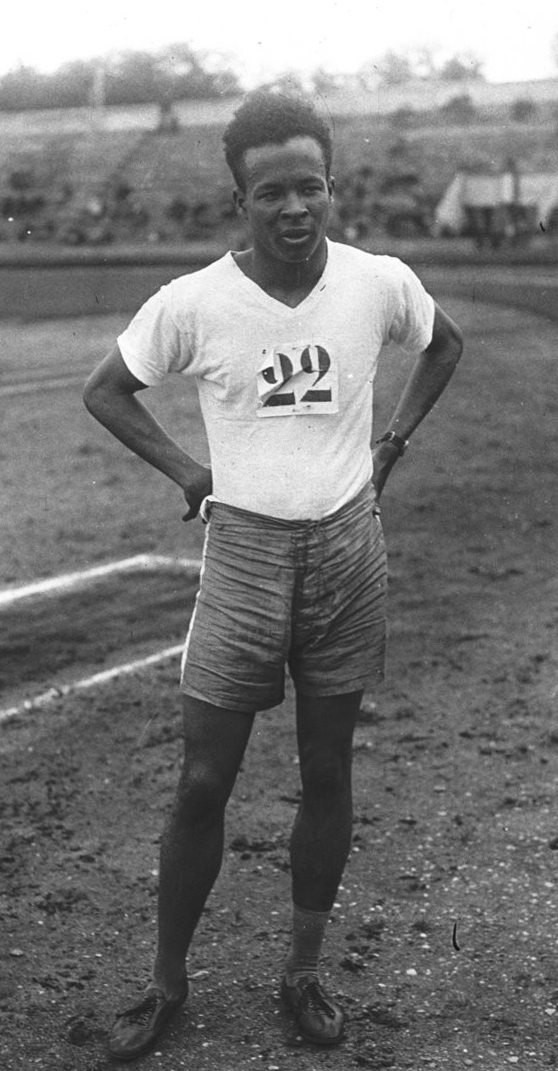
- André Théard in 1926

Personal information
- Nationality: Haitian
- Born: 28 June 1905 Port-au-Prince, Haiti
- Died: 25 June 2003 (aged 97)
- Height: 1.64 m (5 ft 5 in)
- Weight: 52 kg (115 lb)

Sport
- Sport: Track and field
- Event(s): 100 m, 200 m

Achievements and titles
- Personal best(s): 100 m – 10.5 (1926); 200 m – 22.0 (1926)

Valéry André Théard (28 June 1905 – 25 June 2003) was a Haitian sprinter. He competed at the 1924, 1928 and 1932 Summer Olympics in individual 100 m and 200 m events, but failed to reach the finals.

== Biography ==
Théard was the son of a Haitian diplomat, head of protocol in Haiti, descended from an old family from the south of island. He received a good education at the Saint-Louis de Gonzague Institution which enabled him to join the School of Public Works of Paris, in order to obtain an engineering degree. He played football for the Haitian Youth Sports, then started athletics in 1924 after winning the 100 meters of the Haitian championships in 11 seconds.

He participated in three consecutive Olympics with his friend Sylvio Cator. In 1924, during the Paris Games, he distinguished himself on the 200 meters by winning the 17th and last series in 23 s 6, allowing him to qualify for the quarter-finals. He finished the race in 4th place out of six participants, won by the future gold medalist Jackson Scholz.

In spring 1925, he resumed competition and won an 80 meters at Porte-Dorée stadium, then the Prix Blanchet in front of Maurice Degrelle. He won meetings in Bordeaux, Metz and Lisbon and then finished second in the British 1925 AAA Championships behind Loren Murchison.

Member of CASG, he takes part in the speed criterion of Pershing stadium where he competed with André Moulon and won the 100 yards and the 100 meters improving his time in 10 s 6, which corresponded to the Olympic record set by Harold Abrahams in Paris. At the end of August, he equalled the French record for the 150-meter Mourlon in 16 s 1. His performances made him one of the most visible athletes in Europe. He brought his record the following year to 10.5 to 100 meters and 22 s to 200 meters.

In 1927 and 1928, he twice won the title of world champion universitaire over 100 meters.

At the Amsterdam Olympics in 1928, he finished second in his series on 100 meters behind the German Georg Lammers. Despite a time of 10.9 in the quarterfinals, he failed to qualify for the semi-finals, finishing 3rd, beaten by the Canadian Percy Williams and Britain's Jack London. Three days later, he failed in the 100-meter qualifications. He also competed in 1932 Olympics in Los Angeles in the 100 meter event but only finished 4th in his series with a modest time of 11 s 4. He ended his sports career and became treasurer of the Union of Haitian Sports Societies. In 1934, he founded the literary and political review "La Nouvelle Haiti".

In 1937, he began a civil servant career as an accountant at the Ministry of Finance. He rose through the ranks to become undersecretary of state in various cabinets before being appointed Minister of Commerce in 1957, then Minister Finance until 1959.

== Honors ==
- World University Games:
  - Gold Gold medal over 100 meters in Rome in 1927 and Paris in 1928
