= 1928 Summer Olympics medal table =

1928 Summer Olympics medals
- Location: Amsterdam, Netherlands

Highlights
- Most gold medals: United States (22)
- Most total medals: United States (56)
- Medalling NOCs: 33

World map showing the medal achievements of each country during the 1928 Summer Olympics Legend: represents countries that won at least one gold medal. represents countries that won at least one silver medal but no gold medals. represents countries that won at least one bronze medal (no gold or silver). represents participating countries that did not win medals. represents entities that did not participate at the 1928 Summer Olympics.

This 1928 Summer Olympics medal table comprises two tables of countries ranked by the number of medals won during the 1928 Summer Olympics.

The 1928 Summer Olympics were held in and around Amsterdam in the Netherlands from 17 May 1928 to 22 August 1928. A total of 2,883 athletes from 46 countries participated in the sports competition, in 14 sports and 109 events. Additionally, five art competitions were held with 13 events combined. 327 sports medals and 29 arts medals were awarded during the 1928 Summer Olympics. A total of 5,901 souvenir medals were given; 5,139 medals to contestants and officials, and 762 medals to persons that contributed to the Olympics by rendering their services. The souvenir medals are not displayed in the medal tables.

== Medal table ==
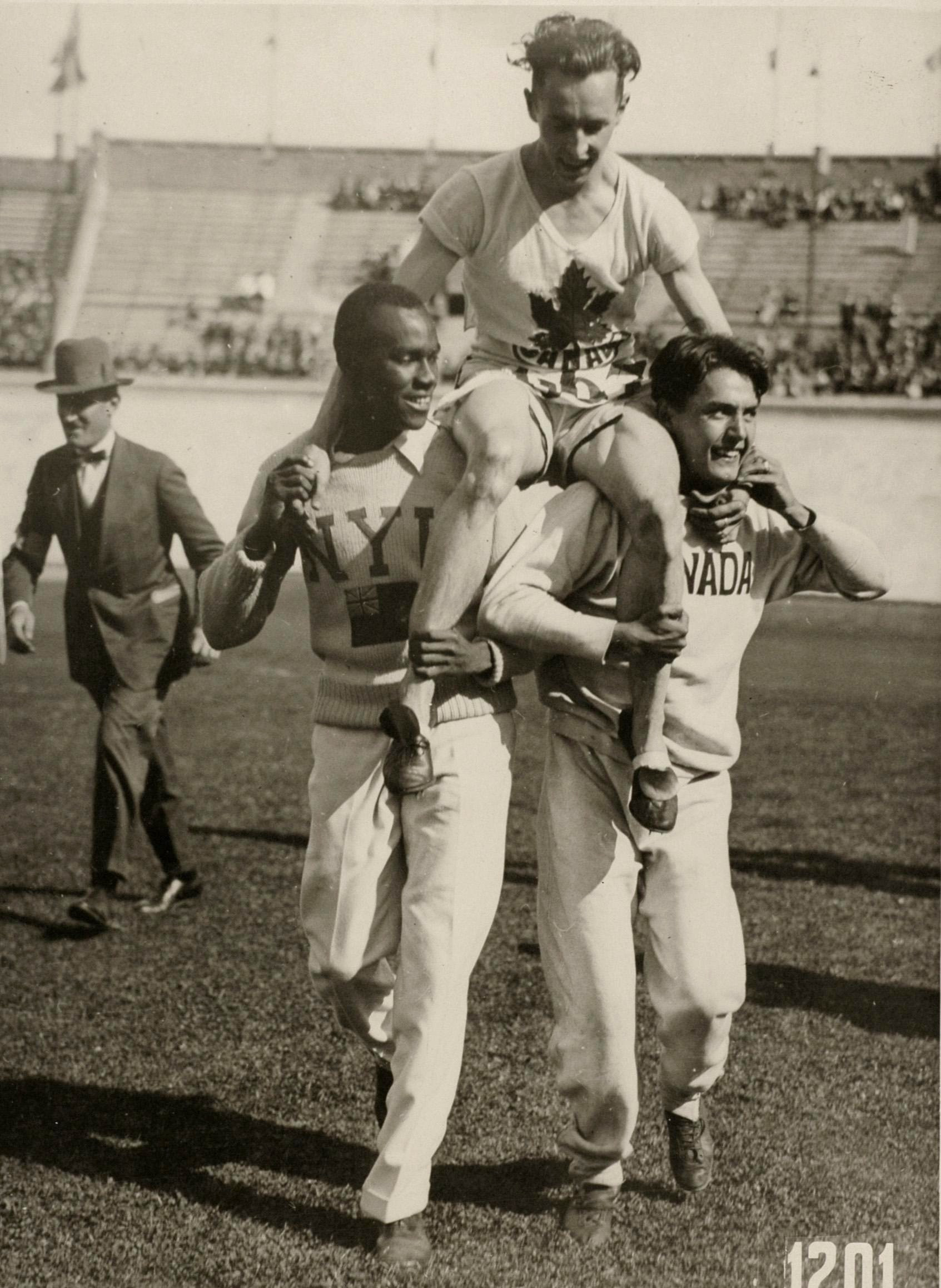
The Canadian track and field athlete Percy Williams won the 100 and 200 meters in the 1928 Summer Olympics

The medal table is based on information provided by the International Olympic Committee (IOC) and is consistent with IOC conventional sorting in its published medal tables. The table uses the Olympic medal table sorting method. By default, the table is ordered by the number of gold medals the athletes from a nation have won, where a nation is an entity represented by a NOC. The number of silver medals is taken into consideration next and then the number of bronze medals. If teams are still tied, equal ranking is given and they are listed alphabetically by their IOC country code.

For the 109 sports events a total of 327 medals were awarded: 110 gold medals, 108 silver medals, and 109 bronze medals. These numbers are unequal, because two gold medals and no silver medals were awarded in the lightweight category of weightlifting, after a first-place tie in the event. The athletes of 33 countries won one or more medals. The most medals (56) and the most gold medals (22) were won by athletes from the United States.

The countries are ranked by the number of gold medals won by the athletes of that country. If countries are tied, first the number of silver medals is taken into consideration and then the number of bronze medals. If, after the above, countries are still tied, equal ranking is given and they are listed alphabetically.

- Medal table does not include art competition medals

* Host nation (Netherlands)

1928 Summer Olympics medal table
Rank	Nation	Gold	Silver	Bronze	Total
1	United States	22	18	16	56
2	Germany	10	7	14	31
3	Finland	8	8	9	25
4	Sweden	7	6	12	25
5	Italy	7	5	7	19
6	Switzerland	7	4	4	15
7	France	6	10	5	21
8	Netherlands*	6	9	4	19
9	Hungary	4	5	0	9
10	Canada	4	4	7	15
11	Great Britain	3	10	7	20
12	Argentina	3	3	1	7
13	Denmark	3	1	2	6
14	Czechoslovakia	2	5	2	9
15	Japan	2	2	1	5
16	Estonia	2	1	2	5
17	Egypt	2	1	1	4
18	Austria	2	0	1	3
19	Australia	1	2	1	4
19	Norway	1	2	1	4
21	Poland	1	1	3	5
21	Yugoslavia	1	1	3	5
23	South Africa	1	0	2	3
24	India	1	0	0	1
24	Ireland	1	0	0	1
24	New Zealand	1	0	0	1
24	Spain	1	0	0	1
24	Uruguay	1	0	0	1
29	Belgium	0	1	2	3
30	Chile	0	1	0	1
30	Haiti	0	1	0	1
32	Philippines	0	0	1	1
32	Portugal	0	0	1	1
Totals (33 entries)		110	108	109	327

Source: www.olympic.org

== Arts competition ==
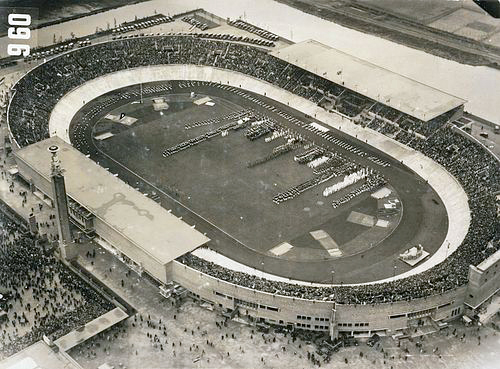
The Dutch architect Jan Wils won the gold medal in architectural design with his design of the Olympic Stadium in Amsterdam

The ranking of the 1928 arts competitions is based on the official report The Ninth Olympiad (1928) of the Dutch National Olympic Committee. Art competitions were held during the Olympic Games from 1912 until 1948.

For the 13 arts events a total of 29 medals were awarded: 9 golden medals, 10 silver medals, and 10 bronze medals. These numbers are inequal, because not for all events three medals were awarded. There was only a silver medal awarded for dramatic works in literature and only a bronze medal for composition for orchestra in music. And also in music, no medals were awarded for compositions for song and composition for one instrument. The most medals (8) were won by contestants from Germany, the most gold medals (2) were won by contestants from the Netherlands.

The countries are ranked by the number of gold medals won by the athletes of that country. If countries are tied, first the number of silver medals is taken into consideration and then the number of bronze medals. If, after the above, countries are still tied, equal ranking is given and they are listed alphabetically.

Source: The Ninth Olympiad (1928)
