= Tudor Sanon =

Haitian taekwondo practitioner

Personal information
- Born: 14 January 1984 (age 42)

Sport
- Sport: Taekwondo
Medal record
Representing Haiti
Pan American Games
Bronze medal – third place	2003 Santo Domingo	+80 kg

Tudor Sanon (born January 14, 1984) is a male Haitian taekwondo athlete. He competed at the 2004 Summer Olympics.

Sanon represented Haiti at the 2004 Summer Olympics in Athens, being his national team's flagbearer.
