= Tim VanNewhouse =

American boxing manager and former boxer (born 1986)

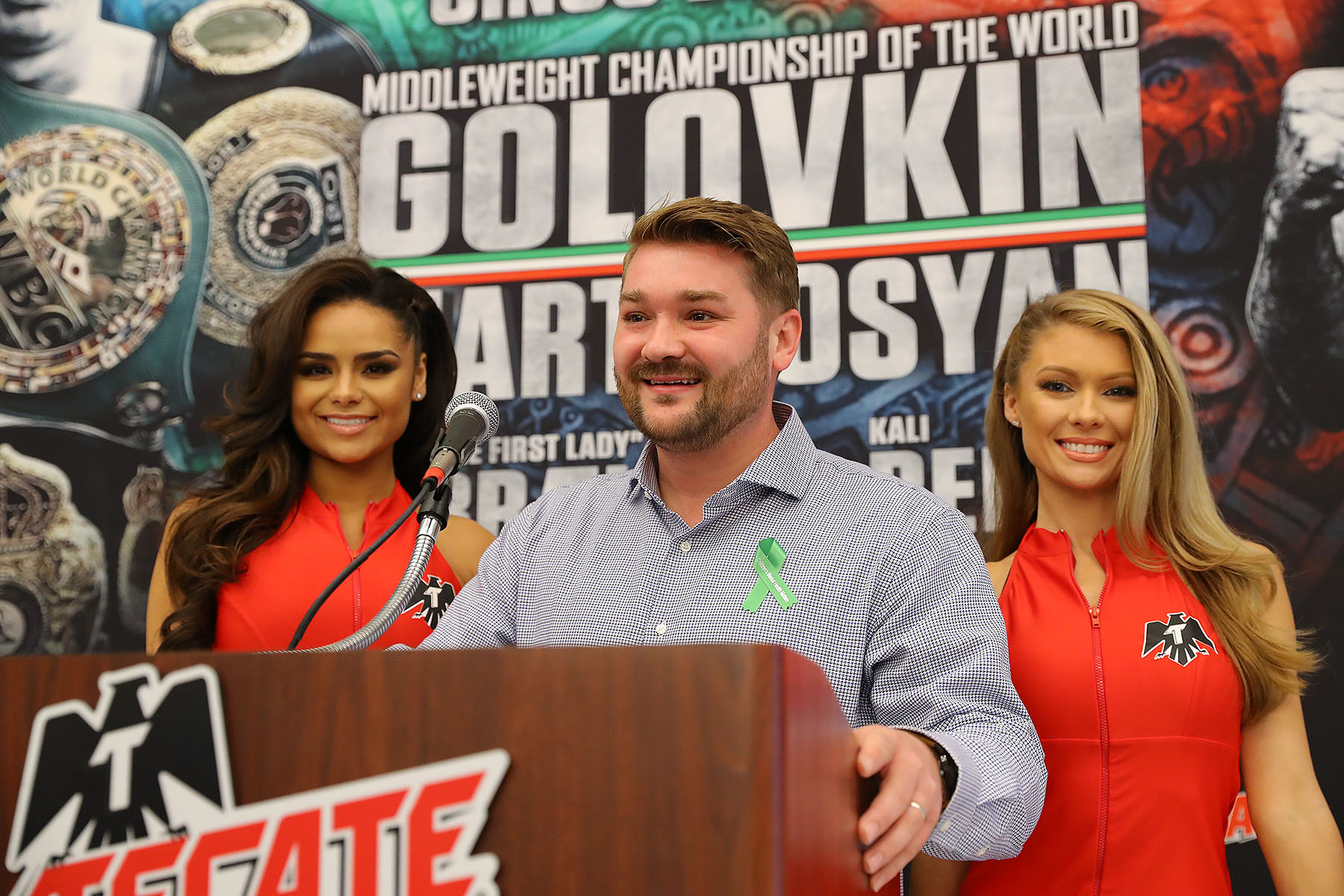

Personal information
- Born: February 14, 1986 (age 40) Cleveland, Ohio, U.S.
- Occupation: Boxing manager
- Website: www.timvannewhouse.us
- Boxing career
- Nickname: Reload
- Height: 5 ft 7 in (170 cm)
- Weight: Light welterweight
- Stance: Orthodox

Boxing record
- Total fights: 1
- Wins: 1
- Win by KO: 1
- Losses: 0
- Updated on August 9, 2020

Tim Van Newhouse (born February 14, 1986) is an American boxing manager and former boxer.

== Amateur career ==
VanNewhouse competed in 86 amateur bouts.

While in middle school, he began his boxing career at the famed Kronk Gym in Cleveland, Ohio, winning a number of amateur titles, including the Washington, D.C. Mayors Cup, the National Platinum Glove Championship, and the Cleveland Golden Gloves in the featherweight division.

In 2003 he was ranked as a top featherweight in the country by USA Boxing in the Men's Under-19 Rankings. In 2005, he moved to Las Vegas with the idea of turning pro and began training at Bob Arum's Top Rank Boxing Gym under the tutelage of Richie Sandoval and Miguel Diaz. Instead of accepting a contract to turn pro, VanNewhouse decided to pursue his dream of boxing in the Olympics. For the next two years, he fought out of Chattanooga, Tennessee, winning the Chattanooga Golden Gloves, the Southern Golden Gloves, and the Southeastern U.S. Championship, winning the outstanding boxer award in each of the southern tournaments; becoming an Olympic hopeful for the city of Chattanooga. But at the Olympic Trials qualifier, he lost a disputed split decision to top lightweight prospect Mason Menard and decided to turn professional.

== Professional career ==
VanNewhouse relocated to the Cleveland area where he began training under the guidance of boxing trainers Joseph Delguyd and Mark Davis Sr. Reports show VanNewhouse being a sought-after prospect for promotional companies but seemed to never come to terms in the negotiation stage. However, he managed to make his professional debut – the only fight of his career – on October 10, 2007, defeating Lee Kreisher via second-round knockout (KO).

== Retirement ==
VanNewhouse walked away from what looked to be a promising professional boxing career without explanation. He married his middle school sweetheart Nicole Sammon in the winter of 2007, shortly thereafter he joined the United States Air Force where he served as a medic at the Air Force Academy in Colorado Springs, Colorado until he was honorably discharged in 2009.

== Promoting and management ==
VanNewhouse began promoting the career of lifelong friend and professional boxer Mark Davis. VanNewhouse has been involved with the Cleveland VA Medical Center and local Veteran Service organizations, and has promoted professional boxing events in the Cleveland area in support of veterans.

As a boxing manager he works under Split-T Management, primarily guiding the careers of up-and-coming boxers and scouting highly touted amateurs. Inside the Ropes and Boxing Scene both reported that VanNewhouse resigned from Split-T in April. Recent successes for VanNewhouse include Marque and Dominic Valle, who earned first-round knockout wins in March.
