= Mireille Joseph =

Haitian sprinter

Personal information
- Nationality: Haitian
- Born: 25 April 1955 (age 70)

Sport
- Sport: Sprinting
- Event: 100 metres

Mireille Joseph (born 25 April 1955) is a Haitian sprinter. She competed in the women's 100 metres at the 1972 Summer Olympics. She was the first woman to represent Haiti at the Olympics.
