= Long Island Marathon =

Annual marathon in New York state

The Long Island Marathon is an annual marathon foot race run on Long Island, New York, United States. The 42.195-kilometre (26.219 mi) event was first run in 1973 as the Earth Day Marathon. The race then consisted of loops around Roosevelt Raceway and Eisenhower Park in East Meadow, New York. It was a relocated and rebranded version of the late winter marathon organized by the Road Runners Club, New York Association (now the New York Road Runners), the Cherry Tree Marathon, which was originally run in the Bronx and later in Central Park.

The event was renamed the Long Island Marathon in 1978 and a half marathon was added in 1984.

Over the years, there were several courses with the current one now starting within Eisenhower Park and running to Charles Lindbergh Boulevard in Uniondale and finishing at Eisenhower Park in East Meadow. For several years, part of the course runs along the Wantagh State Parkway. The Long Island Marathon record of 2:19:53 was set by Lou Calvano in 1979, eclipsing the previous Long Island Record of Paul Fetscher of 2:21:49. Fetscher was also the race director as the Central Park Race moved to Roosevelt Raceway and Eisenhower Park in 1973.
