= Philome Laguerre =

Haitian weightlifter (born 1933)

Personal information
- Nationality: Haitian
- Born: 17 January 1933 (age 92); Cap-Haïtien, Haiti

Sport
- Sport: Weightlifting

Philome Laguerre (born 17 January 1933) is a Haitian weightlifter. He competed in the men's middle heavyweight event at the 1960 Summer Olympics.
