= Deborah Saint-Phard =

Haitian athlete

Personal information
- Nationality: Haitian
- Born: 28 December 1964 (age 61)

Sport
- Sport: Athletics
- Event: Shot put

Deborah Saint-Phard (born 28 December 1964) is a Haitian athlete. She competed in the women's shot put at the 1988 Summer Olympics.

Saint-Phard competed for the Princeton Tigers track and field team in the NCAA.
