= Claude Roumain =

Haitian sprinter

Claude Roumain (born 29 July 1961) is a former Haitian sprinter who competed in the men's 100m competition at the 1992 Summer Olympics. He recorded an 11.07, not enough to qualify for the next round past the heats. His personal best is 10.20, set in 1993. In 1992, he additionally ran the 200m, timed at 22.51. He also competed in the 1988 Summer Olympics in the 100m and 200m events.200m personal best 20.6

Roumain was only let into the 1992 Olympic race at the last minute, after Jason Livingston did not appear.

In the late 1990s, Roumain was the head coach of the Oral Roberts Golden Eagles track and field team.
