= Mulern Jean =

Haitian hurdler

Mulern Jean (born September 25, 1992) is an American-born Haitian hurdler originally from Florida, United States. Born to Haitian parents, she graduated from CSU and then attended Florida State to receive her master's degree. She competed at the 2016 Summer Olympics in the women's 100 metres hurdles race but was disqualified in the heats.

She represented Haiti at the 2020 Summer Olympics.
