= Ernst Laraque =

Haitian judoka (born 1970)

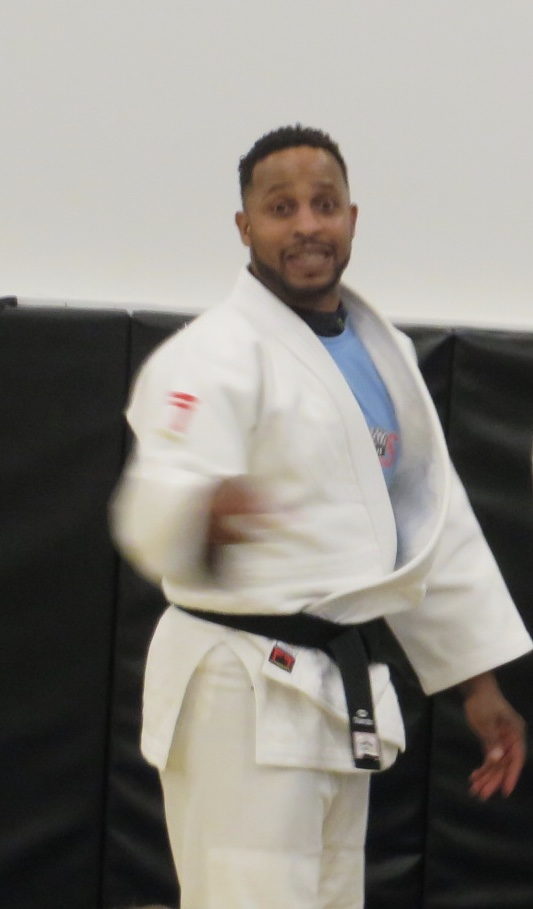

Personal information
- Born: 16 November 1970 (age 55) Haiti
- Occupation: Judoka

Sport
- Sport: Judo
- Weight class: ‍–‍73 kg
- Club: Kiseki Judo
Medal record
Men's judo
Representing Haiti
Pan American Games
Bronze medal – third place	2003 Santo Domingo	73 kg
Pan American Championships
Silver medal – second place	1999 Montevideo	73 kg
Silver medal – second place	1992 Hamilton	73 kg
Bronze medal – third place	2001 Cordoba	73 kg
Bronze medal – third place	1997 Guadalajara	73 kg

Profile at external databases
- JudoInside.com: 2683
- Updated on 27 July 2024

Ernst Laraque (born November 16, 1970) is a Haitian judoka who competed in the men's lightweight division (–73 kg) at the 2000 Summer Olympics in Sydney, Australia, and the 2004 Summer Olympics in Athens, Greece. He won a bronze medal at the 2003 Pan American Games and other medals at multiple Pan American Judo Championships between 1992 and 2001.
