= Asnage Castelly =

Haitian-American wrestler (born 1978)

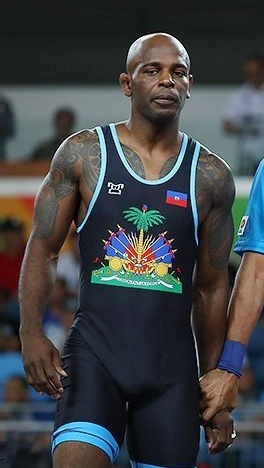
- Castelly at the 2016 Olympics

Personal information
- Born: March 29, 1978 (age 48) Haiti
- Height: 182 cm (6 ft 0 in)
- Weight: 74 kg (163 lb)

Sport
- Sport: Freestyle wrestling
- Club: Nieves Wrestling Club, Springfield, MA, U.S.
- Coached by: Anibal Nieves

Asnage Castelly (born March 29, 1978) is a Haitian-American wrestler who competed for Haiti at the 2016 Summer Olympics in the 74kg freestyle competition.

Born in Haiti, Castelly moved to Irvington, New Jersey, at the age of 9, unable to speak English. Picked on as a child because of his lack of language skills, he became interested in wrestling after seeing a television broadcast of the Olympic games. He attended Irvington High School, where he competed in football, track and wrestling, winning a state district title in the sport. He graduated as part of the class of 1998.

He attended American International College, a liberal arts college in Springfield, Massachusetts, as the first member of his family to ever attend college. There he competed, as part of the school's athletic program, in Division II of the National Collegiate Athletic Association, graduating in 2002. He served in Iraq with the United States Army as a Muslim chaplain, and became a member of the coaching staff at Springfield Technical Community College (STCC) after completing his military service.

Castelly is the first wrestler from Haiti to compete in the Olympics, a nation that has not won any Olympic medals since 1928. In order to be eligible to participate at the international level, he had to create the Haitian Wrestling Federation on his own. He received approval from both the Haitian Olympic Committee and United World Wrestling, the international sanctioning body for the sport, and was allowed to compete. Alberto Nieves and his brother, former Olympian Anibál Nieves – his coaches at American International and the head coaches respectively of the men's and women's programs at STCC – have been acting as his Olympic coaches.

After creating the federation in 2005 and acting as its president, he worked unsuccessfully to compete at the 2008 Summer Olympics in Beijing and the 2012 games in London, before receiving an invitation from United World Wrestling to compete as a wild card entry at the 2016 Summer Olympics in Rio de Janeiro. As part of the 11-member contingent from Haiti at the 2016 games, Castelly was chosen to be the flag bearer at the opening ceremony, an honor that surprised him so much that he "thought it was a joke", when he was first notified. At 6 feet 0 inches (1.83 m) and 163 pounds (74 kg), he competed in the Wrestling Men's Freestyle 74 kg event. He was defeated in the first round by Hassan Yazdani of Iran, who went on to win the gold medal.

In 2015, he stated his intentions to move to Haiti after the 2016 Olympics and launch a wrestling program at Haitian schools by the end of 2020.

Upon returning home to Haiti, his wife was shot 18 times by Steven Junior Perrin.
