= Wilnor Joseph =

Haitian middle-distance runner

Personal information
- Nationality: Haitian
- Born: 15 December 1942 (age 83)

Sport
- Sport: Middle-distance running
- Event: 800 metres

Wilnor Joseph (born 15 December 1942) is a Haitian middle-distance runner. He competed in the men's 800 metres at the 1976 Summer Olympics.
