= Silvio Cator =

Haitian track and field competitor

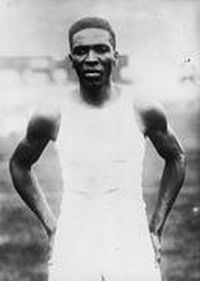

Medal record

Men's athletics

Representing Haiti

Olympic Games
Silver medal – second place	1928 Amsterdam	Long jump

Sylvio or Silvio Paul Cator (October 19, 1900 – July 21, 1952) was a Haitian athlete, most successful in the long jump. He earned a silver medal in the long jump at the 1928 Summer Olympics.

== Biography ==
Born in Cavaillon, Haiti, Cator was a footballer who played for the Trivoli Athletic Club and the Racing Club Haïtien. He participated in the 1924 Summer Olympics in Paris in the high jump, where he finished 15th, and the long jump, where he came in 12th.

In the 1928 Summer Olympics in Amsterdam he won a silver medal in the long jump. His 7.58 m (24 ft 10 in) effort was 16 cm (6 in) short of gold (Edward Hamm). A month later, on September 9, 1928, Sylvio Cator broke Edward Hamm's two-month-old world record with a 7.93 m (26 ft 0 in) jump at the 1924 Olympic stadium near Paris. He participated one more time in the long jump at the 1932 games in Los Angeles, where he took the 9th place.

As of 2021, his silver medal is the best result of a Haitian athlete in the Olympics, with only one other medal (bronze) for the Haitian free rifle team in the 1924 Olympics. His world record long jump is still (2021) the Haitian national record.

In 1946 Cator was elected Mayor of Port-au-Prince. Stade Sylvio Cator, a multi-use stadium in that city, was named after him and was finished in the year of his death in Port-au-Prince. In 1958, Haiti issued a series of seven stamps commemorating Cator's Olympic medal and world record 30 years before.
