= Richardson Viano =

French-Haitian alpine skier (born 2002)

Personal information
- Born: 16 August 2002 (age 24) Tabarre, Ouest, Haiti

Skiing career
- Country: Haiti
- Sport: Alpine skiing
- Club: SC Puy-Saint-Vincent
- Disciplines: Giant slalom, slalom

Olympics
- Teams: 2 – (2022, 2026)

World Championships
- Teams: 3 – (2021, 2023, 2025)
- Medals: 0

Richardson Viano (born 16 August 2002) is a French-Haitian alpine skier, competing in giant slalom and slalom.

== Biography ==
Viano was born on 16 August 2002 in Croix-des-Missions in Tabarre, Ouest, Haiti. He spent 18 months of his life in a Haitian orphanage. In December 2005, at three years of age he was adopted by an Italian couple living at Briançon in France. He was adopted alongside two girls from the same orphanage.

When his new adoptive parents, Andrea Viano and Silvia Grosso-Viano, drove Viano to his new home in the French Alps he was scared by the unfamiliar surroundings but intrigued by the snow, which he called "magic powder". His adoptive father was a ski instructor and Viano became interested in skiing.

=== Athlete ===
The president of the Haitian Ski Federation, Jean-Pierre Roy, who had competed for Haiti at the 2011 FIS World Ski Championships in Germany, called Viano to ask him to consider competing for his birth nation. Viano originally thought the call was a prank but took up the offer after researching Roy and the Federation online. Viano received a Haitian passport in Summer 2019 and his change of nationality was approved by the International Ski Federation that November.

Viano competed for Haiti at the FIS Alpine World Ski Championships 2021 in Italy, coming 35th and achieving enough points to qualify for the 2022 Winter Olympics. He became Haiti's first Winter Olympic athlete. He placed 34th in the men's slalom and failed to complete the giant slalom.

Viano competed in the 2023 FIS Alpine World Ski Championships in France and finished 38th in the men's giant slalom. He skis for the SC Puy-St-Vincent club and speaks French and Italian. He competed at the 2026 Winter Olympic Games in the men's giant slalom, placing 44th.

== World Championship results ==
Year
Year	Age	Slalom	Giant slalom	Super-G	Downhill	Combined	Team combined	Parallel	Team event
2021	18	DNF2	35	—	—	—	—N/a	—	—
2023	20	DNF1	38	—	—	—	—N/a	—	—
2025	22	39	DNFQ2	—	—	—N/a	—	—N/a	—

== Olympic results ==
Year
Year	Age	Slalom	Giant slalom	Super-G	Downhill	Combined	Team combined	Team event
2022	19	34	DNF1	—	—	—	—N/a	—
2026	23	29	44	—	—	—N/a	—	—N/a

== See also ==
- Stevenson Savart
