= Haitian Olympic Committee =

National Olympic Committee

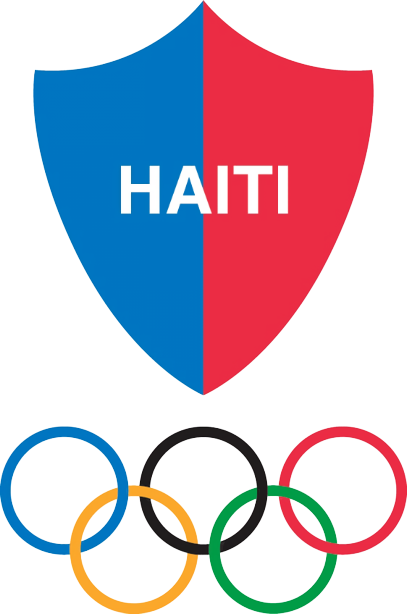
- Country: Haiti
- [[|]]
- Code: HAI
- Created: 1914
- Recognized: 1924
- Continental Association: PASO
- President: Hans Larsen
- Secretary General: Patrick Benjamin Blanchet
- Website: comiteolympiquehaitien.com

The Haitian Olympic Committee (French: Comité olympique haïtien, IOC code: HAI) is the National Olympic Committee representing Haiti. It was first created in 1914 and was recognized by the International Olympic Committee in 1924.
