= National records in the 400 metres =

The following table is an overview of national records in the 400 metres.

== Outdoor ==
=== Men ===
Country	Time	Athlete	Date	Place	Ref.
South Africa	43.03	Wayde van Niekerk	14 August 2016	Rio de Janeiro	
United States	43.18	Michael Johnson	26 August 1999	Seville	
Nigeria	43.38	Samuel Ogazi	12 June 2026	Eugene	
Botswana	43.39	Collen Kebinatshipi	12 September 2026	Budapest	
Great Britain	43.44	Matthew Hudson-Smith	7 August 2024	Saint-Denis	
Bahamas	43.48	Steven Gardiner	4 October 2019	Doha	
Trinidad and Tobago	43.72	Jereem Richards	18 September 2025	Tokyo	
Grenada	43.74	Kirani James	3 July 2014	Lausanne	
Zambia	43.74	Muzala Samukonga	7 August 2024	Saint-Denis	
Jamaica	43.93	Rusheen McDonald	23 August 2015	Beijing	
Saudi Arabia	43.93	Yousef Masrahi	23 August 2015	Beijing	
Colombia	43.93	Anthony Zambrano	2 August 2021	Tokyo	
Canada	44.05	Christopher Morales-Williams	11 May 2024	Gainesville	
Qatar	44.07	Abdalelah Haroun	21 July 2018	London	
Congo DR	44.10	Gary Kikaya	9 September 2006	Stuttgart	
Dominican Republic	44.11	Luguelín Santos	26 August 2015	Beijing	
Cuba	44.14	Roberto Hernández	30 May 1990	Seville	
Belgium	44.15	Alexander Doom	10 June 2024	Rome	
Kenya	44.18	Samson Kitur	3 August 1992	Barcelona	
Brazil	44.29	Sanderlei Parrela	26 August 1999	Seville	
Ivory Coast	44.30	Gabriel Tiacoh	7 June 1986	Indianapolis	
Mexico	44.31	Alejandro Cárdenas	26 August 1999	Seville	
Germany	44.33; 44.50	Thomas Schönlebe (GDR); Erwin Skamrahl (FRG)	3 September 1987; 26 July 1983	Rome; Munich	
Bahrain	44.36	Ali Khamis	14 August 2016	Rio de Janeiro	
Uganda	44.37	Davis Kamoga	5 August 1997	Athens	
Australia	44.38	Darren Clark	26 September 1988	Seoul	
Norway	44.39	Håvard Bentdal Ingvaldsen	20 August 2023	Budapest	
Netherlands	44.41	Jonas Phijffers	12 August 2026	Birmingham	
Barbados	44.43	Jonathan Jones	15 May 2022	Lubbock	
Japan	44.44	Yuki Joseph Nakajima	14 September 2025	Tokyo	
Italy	44.45	Edoardo Scotti	14 September 2025	Tokyo	
France	44.46	Leslie Djhone	29 August 2007	Osaka	
Puerto Rico	44.49	José Figueroa	2 May 2026	Mayagüez	
Argentina	44.53	Elián Larregina	19 July 2025	Madrid	
Hungary	44.55	Attila Molnár	14 September 2025	Tokyo	
Oman	44.56	Mohammed Al-Malki	12 August 1988	Budapest	
Sweden	44.56	Johan Wissman	29 August 2007	Osaka	
Russia	44.56	Aleksey Danilov	21 July 2025	Brest	
Zimbabwe	44.58	Lewis Banda	15 May 2004	Tucson	
Costa Rica	44.60	Nery Brenes	23 June 2016	Madrid	
Sri Lanka	44.61	Sugath Thilakaratne	20 July 1998	Fukuoka	
Poland	44.62	Tomasz Czubak	24 August 1999	Seville	
Mauritius	44.69	Eric Milazar	7 July 2001	Madrid	
Spain	44.69	Bruno Hortelano	22 June 2018	Madrid	
Slovenia	44.70	Rok Ferlan	28 June 2025	Maribor	
Antigua and Barbuda	44.74 (Note: Rai Benjamin officially represented Antigua only until 30 December 2016, when his personal best was 46.19, but did not represent the USA until 3 October 2018.); 45.6 h	Rai Benjamin; Fred Sowerby	21 April 2018; 8 May 1976	Torrance; Knoxville	
Romania	44.74	Mihai Dringo	28 June 2025	Maribor	
Sudan	44.76	Hassan El Kashief	3 June 1982	Provo	
U.S. Virgin Islands	44.77	Tabarie Henry	23 May 2009	Hutchinson	
Ireland	44.77	David Gillick	4 July 2009	Madrid	
Saint Lucia	44.77	Michael Joseph	13 May 2023	Norman, OK	
Czech Republic	44.79	Pavel Maslák	9 May 2014	Doha	
Portugal	44.79	João Coelho	3 August 2023	Chengdu	
Ukraine	44.81	Oleksandr Pohorilko	27 June 2025	Madrid	
Kuwait	44.84	Yousef Karam	22 April 2019	Doha	
United Arab Emirates	44.85	Suleiman Abdulrahman	29 May 2026	Hong Kong	
Guyana	44.87	Malachi Austin	29 May 2026	Lexington	
Greece	44.88	George John Franks	29 May 2026	Lexington	
Thailand	44.90	Joshua Atkinson	26 September 2026	Nagoya	
Scotland	44.93	David Jenkins	21 June 1975	Eugene	-
Senegal	44.94	Cheikh Tidiane Diouf	6 August 2024	Saint-Denis	
Libya	44.98	Mohamed Khouaja	30 July 2010	Nairobi	
India	44.98	Vishal Thennarasu Kayalvizhi	23 May 2026	Ranchi	
Switzerland	44.99	Mathias Rusterholz	3 July 1996	Lausanne	
Cayman Islands	44.99	Jamal Walton	21 July 2017	Trujillo	
Uruguay	45.02	Andrés Silva	17 May 2006	Fortaleza	
Morocco	45.03	Benyounés Lahlou	9 September 1992	Latakia	
Israel	45.04	Donald Sanford	19 July 2015	Zhukovsky	
China	45.06	Liu Kai	3 August 2025	Quzhou	
Venezuela	45.06	Kelvis Padrino	22 August 2025	Caracas	
Ghana	45.13	Ibrahim Hassan	21 April 1996	Walnut	
Algeria	45.13	Malik Louahla	4 August 2001	Edmonton	
Saint Vincent and the Grenadines	45.19	Eswort Coombs	20 April 1997	Walnut	
Tunisia	45.19	Sofiane Labidi	5 June 2004	Seville	
Kazakhstan	45.25	Mikhail Litvin	22 April 2019	Doha	
Bermuda	45.26	Troy Douglas	27 July 1996	Atlanta	
South Sudan	45.27	Stephen Dinho Mallual	5 July 2025	Huizingen	
Panama	45.29	Héctor Daley	15 August 1981	Ciudad Bolívar	
Peru	45.30 A	Fernando Acevedo	1 August 1971	Cali	
Serbia	45.30	Slobodan Branković	29 August 1990	Split	
Dominica	45.31	Bruce Phillip	1 June 1989	Provo	
Slovakia	45.32	Štefan Balošák	27 July 1996	Atlanta	
Bulgaria	45.32	Iliya Dzhivondov	3 June 2000	Sofia	
Estonia	45.35	Rasmus Mägi	25 June 2022	Tallinn	
Iceland	45.36	Oddur Sigurdsson	12 May 1984	Austin	
Uzbekistan	45.37	Sergey Lovachov	22 June 1984	Kyiv	
South Korea	45.37	Shon Ju-il	17 June 1994	Seoul	
Egypt	45.40	Anas Beshr	11 June 2016	Montverde	
Iran	45.40	Sajjad Hashemi	13 June 2021	Erzurum	
Denmark	45.41	Gustav Lundholm Nielsen	14 July 2024	La Chaux-de-Fonds	
Ethiopia	45.42 A	Tegegne Bezabeh	18 October 1968	Mexico City	
Liberia	45.42	Akeem Sirleaf	4 May 2019	Greensboro	
Belarus	45.43	Aliaksandr Linnik	20 June 2015	Cheboksary	
Lesotho	45.46	Henry Mohoanyane	18 March 1988	Bloemfontein	
Lithuania	45.4 h 45.46; 45.4 h	Remigijus Valiulis; Tomas Motiejunas; Jonas Motiejunas	4 June 1980; 24 May 1997; 3 August 2000	Leningrad; Atlanta; Kaunas	
Gambia	45.48	Dawda Jallow	3 April 1993	Atlanta	
Finland	45.49	Markku Kukkoaho	7 September 1972	Munich	
Vietnam	45.50	Tạ Ngọc Tưởng	11 July 2026	Ordos	
Turkey	45.51	Yavuz Can	7 July 2016	Amsterdam	
Latvia	45.53	Jānis Leitis	8 August 2018	Berlin	
Philippines	45.57	Isidro del Prado	1 December 1984	Manila	
Curaçao	45.60	Liemarvin Bonevacia	4 August 2012	London	
Croatia	45.64	Željko Knapić	19 September 1981	Sarajevo	
Congo Republic	45.64	Gilles Anthony Afoumba	25 June 2019	Montgeron	
Saint Kitts and Nevis	45.68	Warren Hazel	22 July 2017	Freeport	
Austria	45.69	Clemens Zeller	3 June 2010	Sankt Pölten	
Haiti	45.71	Gerald Clervil	16 May 1999	Athens, GA	
Sierra Leone	45.72	Va-Sheku Sheriff	14 May 2017	El Paso	
Malaysia	45.73	Umar Osman	6 June 2026	Banqiao Stadium	
Tanzania	45.74 A	Claver Kamanya	16 October 1968	Mexico City	
Iraq	45.74	Taha Hussein Yassen	22 April 2019	Doha	
Namibia	45.80 A	Mahmad Alexander Bock	30 April 2022	Gaborone	
Fiji	45.82	Saimoni Tamani	23 July 1970	Edinburgh	
Benin	45.82	Mathieu Gnanligo	30 June 2012	Porto-Novo	
Azerbaijan	45.83	Yuriy Dudkin	18 September 1986	Tashkent	
Georgia	45.86	Alif Aliyev; Mindia Endeladze	28 August 1983; 29 May 2021	Kyiv; Tbilisi	
Turkmenistan	45.86	Vitaliy Fedotov	26 August 1981	Kyiv	
Faroe Islands	45.86	Jónas Gunnleivsson Isaksen	9 August 2023	Jerusalem	
Albania	45.87	Franko Burraj	24 June 2025	Maribor	
New Zealand	45.87	Lex Revell-Lewis	14 March 2026	Adelaide	
Chile	45.92	Ricardo Roach	21 March 1998	Santiago	
El Salvador	45.99 A	Takeshi Fujiwara	28 April 2012	Medellín	
Cameroon	46.03	Aboubakar Tetnap Nsangou	23 June 2018	Yaoundé	
British Virgin Islands	46.04; 45.84 i	Dean Greenaway; Kyron McMaster	19 May 1979; 14 February 2020	Lincoln; Clemson	
São Tomé and Príncipe	46.07	Filipe Lomba	5 July 1987	Lisbon	
Netherlands Antilles	46.13	Churandy Martina	31 March 2007	El Paso	
Mali	46.14	Yaya Seyba	20 July 1988	Bad Blankenburg	
Bosnia and Herzegovina	46.15	Amel Tuka	28 June 2019	Nembro	
Cyprus	46.16	Evripides Demosthenous	10 July 1999	Palma de Mallorca	
North Macedonia	46.27	Ismail Mačev	13 September 1983	Casablanca	
Ecuador	46.28	Álex Quiñónez	29 June 2019	Braga	
Chinese Taipei (Taiwan)	46.31	Wu Zheng-yan	7 June 2025	Taipei	
Burundi	46.32	Jean-Patrick Nduwimana	30 March 1999	Tucson	
Eswatini	46.36 A	Andile Lusenga	27 April 2019	Gaborone	
Indonesia	46.37	Elieser Wattebosi	14 June 1993	Singapore	
Chad	46.43	Mahamat Goubaye Youssouf	30 June 2016	São Bernardo do Campo	
Mozambique	46.50	Kurt Couto	13 April 2007	Windhoek	
Guatemala	46.50	José Humberto Bermúdez	23 June 2019	Managua	
Turks and Caicos	46.54	Colby Jennings	26 March 2022	Tempe	
Moldova	46.57	Sergey Grigoryev	5 July 1984	Kyiv	
Gabon	46.60	Guy Maganga Gorra	27 March 2021	Mount Olive	
Paraguay	46.62	Augusto José Stanley	8 June 2012	Barquisimeto	
Malta	46.63	Matthew Galea Soler	22 July 2025	Bochum	
Burkina Faso	46.66	Bienvenu Sawadogo	18 June 2019	Bonneuil-sur-Marne	
Kyrgyzstan	46.67; 46.29 i	Nikolay Chernetskiy	7 July 1978; 2 March 1980	Berkeley; Sindelfingen	
Papua New Guinea	46.70	Nelson Stone	8 October 2010	Delhi	
Pakistan	46.73	Abdul Mueed Baloch	29 May 2022	Mashhad	
Guinea	46.76	Amara Conte	26 May 2023	Rochester	
Equatorial Guinea	46.78	Gustavo Envela	14 June 1986	Sacramento	
Madagascar	46.80	Todiasoa Rabearison	1 October 2019	Doha	
Montenegro	46.82	Slaviša Vraneš	19 August 2000	Belgrade	
Lebanon	46.87	Marc Anthony Ibrahim	18 May 2024	Beirut	
Suriname	46.89	Tommy Asinga	4 August 1991	Havana	
Togo	46.92	Kossi Akoto	16 July 1995	Viry-Châtillon	
North Korea	46.95	Hwang Il-Sok	25 June 2000	Odawara	
Armenia	46.99	Akraik Hovanesian	14 July 1986	Kyiv	
Singapore	47.02	Zubin Muncherji	13 May 2018	Bloomington	
Eritrea	47.02	Haben Teklemichal	29 May 2025	Langenthal	
Comoros	47.04	Hadhari Djaffar	7 May 2000	Franconville	
Honduras	47.06	Yariel Matute	21 April 2018	Houston	
Seychelles	47.08	Joseph Adam	16 May 1993	Clemson	
Hong Kong	47.09	Chan Chun Ho	17 November 2025	Guangzhou	
Bolivia	47.12 A	Fernando Copa	6 June 2018	Cochabamba	
French Polynesia	47.13	Isaac Yaya	26 June 2005	Nice	
Syria	47.18	Zahr-el-Din El-Najem	30 June 1999	Beirut	
Niger	47.27; 47.89	Mohamedine Mahamadou	17 June 2012; 27 June 2012	Accra; Porto-Novo	
Anguilla	47.29	Kirthley Richardson	19 May 1995	Odesa	
Angola	47.2 h 47.38	Barceló de Carvalho; João Paulo	16 September 1969; 23 July 1995	Athens; Lisbon	
Bangladesh	47.34; 46.86 #	Mohammad Jahir Rayhan	3 November 2019; 25 January 2019	Mangalagiri; Dhaka	
Gibraltar	47.41	Jessy Franco	1 October 2019	Doha	
Belize	47.42	Benjamin Fairweather	9 May 2015	Utica	
Tajikistan	47.44	Grigoriy Derepaskin	7 July 2019	Almaty	
Maldives	47.48	Hassan Saaid	1 June 2013	Kingston	
Luxembourg	47.4 h 47.76	Emile Jung; David Fiegen	16 August 1969; 20 August 2006	Font-Romeu; La Chaux-de-Fonds	
Macau	47.61	Lei Vai Kun	21 July 1996	Hong Kong	
Vanuatu	47.62	Baptiste Firiam	7 March 1996	Sydney	
Nicaragua	47.62	Yeykell Romero	22 June 2024	San José	
Jordan	47.67	Abdelsalam Khalifa Al-Haj	11 September 1999	Amman	
San Marino	47.67	Alessandro Gasperoni	1 June 2023	Marsa	
Guinea-Bissau	47.70	Edivaldo Monteiro	17 July 1996	Lisbon	
Aruba	47.73	Anthony Rasmijn	26 May 2018	Oordegem	
Kosovo	47.75	Leon Thaqi	2 July 2025	Novo Mesto	
Solomon Islands	47.76	Chris Walasi	27 January 2006	Christchurch	
Central African Republic	47.82	Martial Biguet	1 August 1992	Barcelona	
Malawi	47.85	Golden Gunde	28 July 2014	Glasgow	
Mauritania	47.87	Youba Hmeida	4 August 2001	Edmonton	
Somalia	47.91	Ibrahim Okash Omar	4 August 1984	Los Angeles	
Rwanda	47.93 A	Emmanuel Nitakiyimana	7 July 2016	Kampala	
Cape Verde	47.96	Salvador Lopes Goncalves	10 September 2000	Luxembourg	
Andorra	48.00; 47.94 i	Pau Blasi; Daniel Gómez	9 July 2023; 6 February 2000	L'Hospitalet de Llobregat; Seville	
Mongolia	48.15	Tsendsuren Erdene-Munkh	14 June 1989	Bratislava	
Yemen	48.27	Ahmed Al-Yaari	21 April 2019	Doha	
Guam	48.29; 47.59 #	David Wilson; Aaron Whitaker	12 April 1997; 13 May 2017	Palo Alto; Monmouth	
Tonga	48.31	Henele Taliai	1 March 1997	Melbourne	
Nepal	48.32	Asha Ram Chaudhari	28 September 1990	Beijing	
Palestine	48.4 h 48.61	Fareed Faraj; Mohammed Abukhousa	5 March 1989; 25 February 2017	Kuwait City; Réduit	
Brunei	48.53	Mohamed Arman Hj Sanip	10 July 1999	Taverny	
American Samoa	48.4 h	Kelsey Nakanelua	10 June 2000	Honolulu	
Montserrat	48.55; 48.00 i	Stephen Lewis; Julius Morris	1 May 1992; 2 December 2017	Spokane; Nashville	
Monaco	48.63	Brice Etès	3 June 2011	Schaan	
Myanmar	48.63	Htay Win	30 November 1991	Manila	
Norfolk Island	48.63	Jonathan McKee	4 July 1987	Varberg	
Samoa	48.67	Siologa Sepa	4 September 2013	Mata-Utu	
Cambodia	48.82; 47.4 h#	Chhem Savin	3 September 1972; 4 August 1967	Munich; Phnom Penh	
New Caledonia	48.8 h 49.11	Frédéric Erin	18 February 2000; 13 May 2011	Hamilton; Nouméa	
Afghanistan	49.0 h 49.59	Habib Zareef; Said Gilani	1963; 25 June 2017	Kabul; Berlin	
Palau	49.17	Conrad Rdechor	25 August 2000	Adelaide	
Cook Islands	49.19	Alex Beddoes	1 March 2019	Melbourne	
Djibouti	49.22	Fathi Moussa Robleh	20 May 2023	Radès	
Liechtenstein	49.32; 47.9 h#	Fabian Haldner; Günther Hasler	7 September 2014; 1 June 1975	Geneva; Bern	
Laos	49.73	Kingkeo Inthavong	24 August 2017	Bukit Jalil	
Micronesia	50.22; 50.1 h	Jack Howard	25 July 2002; 7 December 2002	Kolonia, Pohnpei; Ballarat	
Kiribati	50.25	Kenaz Kaniwete	5 July 2025	Koror, Palau	
Marshall Islands	50.4 h	Martin Motu'ahala	30 July 1994	Majuro	
Wallis and Futuna	50.6 h	Patita Fotutata	25 September 1985	Fiua	
Timor-Leste	50.79	Domingos Salio dos Santos	12 June 2015	Kallang	
Bhutan	51.16	Tshering Penjor	15 September 2021	Yokoyama	
Nauru	51.3 h 51.47	Tryson Duburiya; Jonah Harris	c. 1991; 1 December 2018	Meneng; Brisbane	
Northern Mariana Islands	52.74	Beouch Ngirchongor	1 July 2014	Palikir	
Niue	52.87	Kalapu Liutose Liuvaie	13 September 1991	Port Moresby	
Tuvalu	54.81	Telava Folitau	6 August 2009	Gold Coast	

=== Women ===
Country	Time	Athlete	Date	Place	Ref.
Germany	47.60	Marita Koch	6 October 1985	Canberra	
United States	47.78	Sydney McLaughlin-Levrone	18 September 2025	Tokyo	
Dominican Republic	47.98	Marileidy Paulino	18 September 2025	Tokyo	
Czech Republic	47.99	Jarmila Kratochvílová	10 August 1983	Helsinki	
Bahrain	48.14	Salwa Eid Naser	3 October 2019	Doha	
France	48.25	Marie-José Pérec	29 July 1996	Atlanta	
Ukraine	48.27	Olha Bryzhina	6 October 1985	Canberra	
Bahamas	48.36	Shaunae Miller-Uibo	6 August 2021	Tokyo	
Jamaica	48.57	Nickisha Pryce	20 July 2024	London	
Australia	48.63	Cathy Freeman	29 July 1996	Atlanta	
Mexico	48.89	Ana Gabriela Guevara	27 August 2003	Saint-Denis	
Poland	48.90	Natalia Kaczmarek	20 July 2024	London	
Norway	49.04	Henriette Jæger	15 August 2026	Birmingham	
Ireland	49.07	Rhasidat Adeleke	10 June 2024	Roma	
Nigeria	49.10	Falilat Ogunkoya	29 July 1996	Atlanta	
Russia	49.11; 48.9 h#	Olga Nazarova	25 September 1988; 13 September 1988	Seoul; Vladivostok	
Kyrgyzstan	49.19	Mariya Pinigina	10 August 1983	Helsinki	
Namibia	49.22; 48.54 #	Christine Mboma	17 April 2021; 30 June 2021	Windhoek; Bydgoszcz	
Great Britain	49.29	Amber Anning	9 August 2024	Saint-Denis	
Botswana	49.33	Amantle Montsho	19 July 2013	Monaco	
Cuba	49.2 h	Ana Fidelia Quirot	13 August 1989	Bogotá	
Netherlands	49.44; 49.17 i	Femke Bol	17 August 2022; 2 March 2024	Munich; Glasgow	
Bulgaria	49.53	Vanya Stambolova	27 August 2006	Rieti	
Barbados	49.58	Sada Williams	21 August 2023	Budapest	
South Africa	49.62	Caster Semenya	8 September 2018	Ostrava	
Colombia	49.64	Ximena Restrepo	5 August 1992	Barcelona	
Spain	49.67	Sandra Myers	6 July 1991	Oslo	
Chile	49.72	Martina Weil	28 August 2025	Zurich	
China	49.81	Yuqin Ma	11 September 1993	Beijing	
Senegal	49.86	Amy Mbacké Thiam	7 August 2001	Edmonton	
Romania	49.88	Ionela Târlea	12 July 1999	Palma de Mallorca	
Canada	49.91	Marita Payne; Jillian Richardson-Briscoe	6 August 1984; 25 September 1988	Los Angeles; Seoul	
Belgium	49.96	Cynthia Bolingo	21 August 2023	Budapest	
Egypt	50.10	Bassant Hemida	21 June 2026	Hengelo	
Finland	50.14	Riitta Salin	4 September 1974	Roma	
Kenya	50.14 A	Mercy Oketch	31 May 2025	Nairobi	
Guyana	50.20	Aliyah Abrams	13 May 2023	Freeport	
Zambia	50.22	Kabange Mupopo	15 September 2015	Brazzaville	
Zimbabwe	50.25	Vimbayi Maisvoreva	19 April 2025	Gainesville	
Italy	50.30	Libania Grenot	2 July 2009	Pescara	
Belarus	50.31	Ilona Usovich	27 August 2007	Osaka	
Chad	50.38	Kaltouma Nadjina	6 August 2001	Edmonton	
Greece	50.45	Maria Belimpasaki	11 August 2018	Berlin	
Lithuania	50.49	Modesta Justė Morauskaitė	25 May 2022	Huelva	
Uzbekistan	50.52	Marina Shmonina	6 July 1990	Kyiv	
Switzerland	50.52	Lea Sprunger	1 July 2018	La Chaux-de-Fonds	
Puerto Rico	50.52	Gabby Scott	6 August 2024	Saint-Denis	
Portugal	50.59	Cátia Azevedo	3 June 2021	Huelva	
Slovakia	50.59	Emma Zapletalová	16 June 2026	Ostrava	
Austria	50.60	Susanne Gogl-Walli	5 September 2024	Zürich	
Brazil	50.62	Maria Magnólia Figueiredo	21 August 1990	Rovereto	
Saint Vincent	50.63	Shafiqua Maloney	14 July 2024	Lignano Sabbiadoro	
Grenada	50.64	Hazel-Ann Regis	16 May 2004	Oxford	
Kazakhstan	50.68	Tatyana Roslanova	5 June 2004	Almaty	
Cameroon	50.69	Mireille Nguimgo	13 August 2000	La Chaux-de-Fonds	
Niger	50.69; 49.19 #	Aminatou Seyni	23 August 2018; 5 July 2019	Rovereto; Lausanne	
Croatia	50.78	Danijela Grgić	17 August 2006	Beijing	
India	50.79	Hima Das	26 August 2018	Jakarta	
Cyprus	50.80	Eleni Artymata	4 August 2021	Tokyo	
Saint Kitts and Nevis	50.83	Tiandra Ponteen	11 June 2005	Sacramento	
Latvia	50.83	Gunta Vaičule	29 June 2024	Valmiera	
Uganda	50.93 A	Leni Shida	31 May 2025	Nairobi	
Sri Lanka	51.05	Damayanthi Dharsha	30 August 2000	Jakarta	
Gambia	51.10	Sanu Jallow-Lockhart	11 April 2026	College Station	
Bermuda	51.11	Caitlyn Bobb	17 May 2025	Winston-Salem	
Sweden	51.13	Moa Hjelmer	29 June 2012	Helsinki	
Sudan	51.19	Nawal El Jack	15 July 2005	Marrakesh	
Slovenia	51.22	Anita Horvat	20 July 2018	Monaco	
Haiti	51.23	Marlena Wesh	7 July 2012	Irapuato	
British Virgin Islands	51.24	Adaejah Hodge	28 March 2026	Coral Gables	
Sierra Leone	51.36	Maggie Barrie	13 May 2018	Bloomington, Indiana	
Mozambique	51.37	Maria Mutola	2 August 1994	Monaco	
Ethiopia	51.37	Ajayeba Aliye	13 May 2026	Accra	
Ghana	51.46	Rafiatu Nuhu	25 May 2018	Hutchinson, Kansas	
Benin	51.47	Fabienne Feraez	14 July 2006	Roma	
U.S. Virgin Islands	51.47	Laverne Jones-Ferrette	21 April 2007	Lawrence, Kansas	
Hungary	51.50	Ilona Pál; Barbara Petráhn	11 August 1980; 13 May 2006	Budapest; Xalapa	
Ecuador	51.53	Nicole Caicedo	29 July 2023	São Paulo	
Liberia	51.55	Kia Davis	17 May 2008	Ponce, Puerto Rico	
Malawi	51.55	Asimenye Simwaka	7 August 2022	Birmingham	
New Zealand	51.60	Kim Robertson	19 January 1980	Christchurch	
Tunisia	51.66	Awatef Ben Hassine	24 June 2004	Algiers	
Burkina Faso	51.66	Sita Sibiri	19 July 2025	Saint-Étienne	
Morocco	51.67	Nezha Bidouane	1 September 1998	Berlin	
Peru	51.71	Arie Aoki	3 May 2025	Fukuroi, Shizuoka	
Japan	51.75	Asami Tanno	3 May 2008	Shizuoka	
Malaysia	51.79	Shereen Vallabouy	1 June 2024	Murfreesboro	
Vietnam	51.83	Nguyen Thi Tinh	8 December 2003	Hanoi	
Trinidad and Tobago	51.83	Janeil Bellille	21 June 2014	Port of Spain	
Fiji	51.89	Makelesi Batimala	26 June 2004	Brisbane	
Serbia	51.89	Tamara Salaški	9 June 2016	Stara Zagora	
Estonia	51.91	Egle Uljas	21 August 2004	Athens	
Venezuela	51.94	Nercely Soto	26 November 2013	Trujillo, Peru	
Ivory Coast	51.94	Jessika Gbai	13 April 2024	Gainesville	
Moldova	52.00	Olesea Cojuhari	15 June 2012	Bucharest	
Suriname	52.01	Letitia Vriesde	12 July 1997	Arnhem	
North Korea	51.9 h 56.23	Sin Kim-dan; Chi Jong Ok	23 October 1962; 15 October 1991	Pyongyang	
Madagascar	52.05	Ony Paule Ratsimbazafy	19 July 1998	Paris	
Israel	52.06	Anna Tkach	24 August 2003	Saint-Denis	
Turkmenistan	52.10	Alyona Petrova	23 June 2001	Almaty	
Georgia	52.13	Maia Azarashvili	12 June 1988	Leningrad	
Turkey	52.15	Birsen Bekgöz	30 July 2011	Ankara	
Mali	52.16	Djénébou Danté	16 July 2017	Marseille	
Cayman Islands	52.17	Shalysa Wray	14 May 2022	Lubbock	
United Arab Emirates	52.15	Mariam Kareem	5 September 2026	Muscat	
Saint Lucia	52.21	Verneta Lesforis	25 June 1999	Bridgetown	
Lesotho	52.31	Mamakoli Senauouane	12 April 2025	Gaborone	
Argentina	52.2 h	Olga Conte	23 March 1997	Buenos Aires	
Malta	52.37	Janet Richard	20 June 2023	Chorzów	
Panama	52.43	Gianna Woodruff	23 April 2022	Waco, Texas	
Panama	52.43	Gianna Woodruff	2 May 2026	Baton Rouge	
Antigua & Barbuda	52.49	Afia Charles	12 May 2013	Houston	
Togo	52.50	Sandrine Thiébaud-Kangni	24 August 2003	Saint-Denis	
Turks and Caicos	52.50	Yanique Haye-Smith	10 April 2021	Greensboro	
Uruguay	52.53	Déborah Rodríguez	3 October 2014	Montevideo	
Costa Rica	52.57	Zoila Stewart	25 November 1993	Ponce	
Thailand	52.60	Noodang Phimphoo	14 June 1993	Singapore	
Myanmar	52.69	Yin Yin Khine	29 November 2005	Manila	
Tajikistan	52.70	Gulsumbi Sharifova	7 July 2019	Almaty	
Lebanon	53.72	Rasha Badrani	19 April 2025	Walnut	
Chinese Taipei	52.74	Chi Cheng	29 July 1970	Stockholm	
Kuwait	52.80	Mona Al-Mubarak	16 May 2022	Kuwait	
Iceland	52.83	Guðrún Arnardóttir	14 August 1997	London	
Denmark	52.84; 52.59 i	Rikke Rønholt; Sara Slott Petersen	6 July 2006; 13 February 2016	Århus; Växjö	
Luxembourg	52.84	Fanny Arendt	1 May 2025	Lubbock, Texas	
Albania	52.86	Klodiana Shala	8 August 2006	Gothenburg	
Iran	52.95	Maryam Tousi	8 May 2012	Bangkok	
Algeria	52.98	Zahra Bouras	1 June 2009	Rehlingen	
Eswatini	53.02	Phumlile Ndzinisa	14 September 2015	Brazzaville	
Congo Republic	53.03	Elodie Malessara	21 June 2024	Dakar	
Papua New Guinea	53.19	Toea Wisil	14 August 2010	Gold Coast	
Belize	53.19	Samantha Dirks	30 April 2016	Irvine	
Indonesia	53.22	Sri Maya Sari	12 October 2021	Timika	
Dominica	53.40	Dawn Williams	13 April 1996	Jonesboro	
Iraq	53.44	Gulustan Mahmood Ieso	21 November 2010	Guangzhou	
Armenia	53.48	Amaliya Sharoyan	28 May 2015	Sochi	
Burundi	53.48	Francine Niyonsaba	4 May 2018	Eugene	
São Tomé and Príncipe	53.48	Gorete Semedo	25 May 2022	Huelva	
Syria	53.55	Ghofrane Al-Mohamed	10 September 2006	Algiers	
Pakistan	53.63	Najma Parveen	11 November 2019	Peshawar	
South Korea	53.67	Lee Yun-Kyung	12 August 2003	Taebaek	
Singapore	53.67	Shanti Pereira	30 March 2024	Gainesville	
North Macedonia	53.77	Elizabeta Božinovska	14 June 1983	Nova Gorica	
Philippines	53.81; 53.71 i	Kayla Anise Richardson; Lauren Hoffman	14 April 2017; 9 February 2024	Torrance; Clemson	
Bolivia	53.90 A	Cecilia Gómez	18 April 2021	Cochabamba	
Nicaragua	53.90	María Carmona	20 October 2025	Quetzaltenango	
Vanuatu	53.92	Mary Estelle Kapalu	5 August 1995	Gothenburg	
Mauritius	54.19	Angelique Abberley	9 August 2025	Oordegem	
Bosnia and Herzegovina	54.28	Dijana Kojić	24 July 1999	Komotini	
Kosovo	54.30	Vijona Kryeziu	13 August 2016	Rio de Janeiro	
Liechtenstein	54.47	Maria Ritter	20 August 1978	Zurich	
Cape Verde	54.50	Vera Barbosa	9 May 2009	Osaka	
Guinea	54.50	Asta Dramé	20 May 2012	Aix-les-Bains	
Central African Republic	54.61	Emmanuëlle Kogalama	30 June 2001	Saint Étienne	
Qatar	54.67	Naima Afok Mansour	7 April 2025	Doha	
El Salvador	54.72	Verónica Quijano	29 November 2001	Guatemala City	
South Sudan	54.73	Bakhita John Moresio	7 April 2025	Doha	
Maldives	54.83	Aishath Himna Hassan	24 June 2023	Kingston	
Azerbaijan	54.83	Lamiya Valiyeva	2 August 2023	Chengdu	
Congo DR	54.88	Maria Bangala	30 April 2022	Nashville	
Mongolia	54.97	Munkhkherlen Tsoodol	10 July 2026	Ordos City	
Tanzania	54.99	Leticia Athanas	7 August 1987	Nairobi	
Eritrea	54.99	Nazret Weldu	24 May 2007	Khartoum	
Hong Kong	55.03	Wan Kin Yee	17 June 2012	Zhuhai	
Gabon	55.12	Josée Juanelle Amoussou	10 August 2025	Douala	
Honduras	55.24	Heidy Palacios	17 June 2012	Managua	
Angola	55.34	Guilhermina Cruz	15 August 1993	Stuttgart	
Jordan	55.38	Aliya Boshnak	12 July 2017	Nairobi	
Anguilla	55.41	Artesha Richardson	13 May 2017	El Paso, Texas	
Bangladesh	55.46	Beauty Nazmun Nahar	5 April 2004	Islamabad	
Andorra	55.50 i	Duna Viñals	9 March 2024	Salamanca	
Paraguay	55.50	Montserrath Gauto	9 July 2025	Quito	
Guatemala	55.64	Patricia Meigham	4 August 1984	Los Angeles	
Comoros	55.91	Salhate Djamalidine	28 June 2003	Radès	
Northern Mariana Islands	56.24	Yvonne Bennett	13 April 2013	Ogden	
Samoa	56.32	Kim Peterson	10 February 1990	Auckland	
French Polynesia	56.35	Hereiti Bernardino	17 July 2019	Apia	
Equatorial Guinea	56.37	Frida Pilar Ondo Mbang	20 July 2003	Madrid	
Montenegro	56.47	Danijela Srdanović	4 July 1992	Belgrade	
Libya	56.89	Najla Aqdeir Ali Salem	21 May 2016	Lodi	
Guinea-Bissau	57.02	Artimiza Sá	5 July 2003	Guarda	
Seychelles	57.05	Mirenda Francourt	4 April 1993	LaGrange	
Oman	57.06	Hanaa Al Qassimi	22 June 2026	Dubai	
Macau	57.07	Leong Ka Man	27 September 2014	Incheon	
Gibraltar	57.66; 57.40 (Note: not recognized by World Athletics)	Sharon Mifsud	25 June 1991; 16 July 1995	Mariehamn; Gibraltar	
Aruba	57.78	Jelissa Nedd	8 July 2011	Willemstad	
Guam	57.89	Regine Tugade	6 May 2016	Dededo	
Tonga	57.98	Vasa Tulahe	30 January 1994	Sydney	
Palestine	58.08	Hanna Barakat	20 May 2017	Norwalk	
San Marino	58.23	Beatrice Berti	28 June 2023	Castelfranco Emilia	
Solomon Islands	58.88	Samantha Rofo	7 July 2016	Suva	
Saudi Arabia	59.17	Sarah Abdel Karim	9 May 2025	Taif	
Monaco	59.37	Marie-Charlotte Gastaud	6 July 2023	Cannes	
Djibouti	59.79	Mariam Isman Waïss	15 March 2019	Djibouti City	
Montserrat	1:01.80	Jenalyn Weekes	28 February 2016	Vieux-Fort	
Afghanistan	1:12.72	Yalda Amini	13 June 2018	Sipoo	

== Indoor / short track ==
=== Men ===
Country	Time	Athlete	Date	Place	Ref.
Canada	44.49	Christopher Morales-Williams	24 February 2024	Fayetteville	
United States	44.52	Michael Norman	10 March 2018	College Station	
Nigeria	44.57	Samuel Ogazi	14 March 2026	Fayetteville	
Grenada	44.80	Kirani James	27 February 2011	Fayetteville	
Jamaica	44.86	Akeem Bloomfield	10 March 2018	College Station	
Trinidad and Tobago	45.00	Jereem Richards	19 March 2022	Belgrade	
Hungary	45.01	Attila Molnár	3 February 2026	Ostrava	
Germany	45.05	Thomas Schönlebe	5 February 1988	Sindelfingen	
Norway	45.05	Karsten Warholm	2 March 2019	Glasgow	
Costa Rica	45.11	Nery Brenes	10 March 2012	Istanbul	
Uganda	45.18	Eugene Omalla	23 February 2024	Lubbock	
Czech Republic	45.24	Pavel Maslák	8 March 2014	Sopot-Gdańsk	
Belgium	45.25	Alexander Doom	2 March 2024	Glasgow	
Poland	45.31	Maksymilian Szwed	8 March 2025	Apeldoorn	
Bahamas	45.33	Demetrius Pinder	12 March 2011	College Station	
Sweden	45.33	Carl Bengtström	19 March 2022	Belgrade	
Netherlands	45.35	Jonas Phijffers	22 February 2026	Apeldoorn	
Barbados	45.38	Jonathan Jones	8 February 2019	Lubbock	
Great Britain	45.39	Jamie Baulch	9 February 1997	Birmingham	
Qatar	45.39	Abdalelah Haroun	19 February 2015	Stockholm	
Australia	45.44	Steven Solomon	23 February 2018	Clemson	
Saint Lucia	45.46	Michael Joseph	24 February 2024	Lubbock	
Ireland	45.52	David Gillick	3 March 2007; 20 February 2010	Birmingham; Birmingham	
France	45.54	Leslie Djhone	5 March 2011	Paris	
Spain	45.58	Óscar Husillos	19 February 2023	Madrid	
Cayman Islands	45.62	Jamal Walton	29 February 2020	College Station	
Zimbabwe	45.67	Lewis Banda	10 March 2006	Fayetteville	
South Africa	45.67	Derrick Mokaleng	8 February 2019	Lubbock	
Denmark	45.67	Benjamin Lobo Vedel	19 March 2022	Belgrade	
Congo DR	45.71	Gary Kikaya	15 March 2003	Fayetteville	
Botswana	45.74	California Molefe	10 March 2006	Moscow	
Japan	45.76	Shunji Karube	9 March 1997	Paris	
Lithuania	45.78	Tomas Keršulis	11 February 2023	Boston	
China	45.79	Ailixier Wumaier	31 March 2024	Tianjin	
Brazil	45.79	Matheus Lima	21 March 2025	Nanjing	
Dominican Republic	45.80	Luguelín Santos	24 February 2017	Madrid	
Morocco	45.80 A	Houssam Hatib	1 February 2025	Albuquerque	
U.S. Virgin Islands	45.81	Tabarie Henry	30 January 2010	College Station	
Greece	45.83	George John Franks	13 February 2026	Clemson	
British Virgin Islands	45.84	Kyron McMaster	14 February 2020	Clemson	
Portugal	45.86	João Coelho	2 March 2024	Glasgow	
Russia	45.90	Ruslan Mashchenko	1 March 1998	Valencia	
Switzerland	45.92	Alain Rohr	13 February 2000	Magglingen	
Mexico	45.93	Alejandro Cárdenas	9 February 2000; 17 February 2000	Piraeus; Stockholm	
Tunisia	45.93	Sofiane Labidi	13 February 2004	Fayetteville	
Romania	45.94	Ioan Vieru	2 March 2002	Vienna	
Kenya	45.98	Charles Gitonga	19 February 1995	Liévin	
Italy	45.99	Ashraf Saber	1 March 1998	Valencia	
Estonia	45.99	Marek Niit	26 February 2011	Fayetteville	
Dominica	46.02	Chris Lloyd	16 February 2008	Birmingham	
Slovenia	46.02	Luka Janežič	27 January 2018	Vienna	
Colombia	46.07	Jhon Perlaza	9 March 2019	Birmingham, AL	
Cuba	46.09	Roberto Hernández	7 March 1987	Indianapolis	
Austria	46.14	Christoph Pöstinger	22 February 1999	Chemnitz	
Guyana	46.15	Arinze Chance	18 January 2019	Columbia, SC	
Turkey	46.20	Yavuz Can	25 February 2016	Istanbul	
Ghana	46.21	Emmanuel Dasor	25 February 2016	Birmingham, AL	
Serbia	46.22	Boško Kijanović	7 March 2022	Belgrade	
Sudan	46.24	Rabah Yousif	20 February 2010; 19 February 2011	Birmingham; Birmingham	
Panama	46.26	Bayano Kamani	29 January 2005	Boston	
Kuwait	46.26	Yousef Karam	8 February 2020	Toruń	
Kazakhstan	46.26	Mikhail Litvin	19 January 2019	Oskemen	
Mauritius	46.28	Eric Milazar	26 February 2006	Aubiére	
Kyrgyzstan	46.29	Nikolay Chernetskiy	2 March 1980	Sindelfingen	
Ukraine	46.32	Oleksandr Pohorilko	7 March 2025	Apeldoorn	
Puerto Rico	46.34 A	José Figueroa	3 February 2024	Albuquerque	
Bulgaria	46.35	Iliya Dzhivondov	11 February 2000	Piraeus	
Saudi Arabia	46.35	Mazen Al-Yassin	19 September 2017	Ashgabat	
Argentina	46.37 A	Elián Larregina	28 January 2024	Cochabamba	
Croatia	46.38	Luciano Sušanj	11 March 1973	Rotterdam	
Israel	46.46	Donald Blair-Sanford	8 February 2014	Boston	
Ivory Coast	46.50	Cheickna Traore	13 January 2024	State College	
Somalia	46.51	Harun Abda	25 February 2012	Lincoln	
Antigua and Barbuda	46.59	Rai Benjamin	14 March 2015	New York City	
Saint Kitts and Nevis	46.59	Warren Hazel	1 February 2019	Columbia	
Bahrain	46.60	Abbas Abubakar Abbas	20 February 2016	Doha	
Slovakia	46.61	Patrik Dömötör	15 February 2025	Birmingham	
Gambia	46.62	Dawda Jallow	28 February 1991	Gainesville	
Senegal	46.62	Cheikh Tidiane Diouf	4 February 2026	Louvain-La-Neuve	
Congo Republic	46.68	Gilles Anthony Afoumba	5 February 2020	Reims	
Venezuela	46.70	Kelvis Padrino	20 March 2026	Toruń	
Algeria	46.71	Djabir Said-Guerni	13 February 2002	Eaubonne	
Latvia	46.71	Jānis Leitis	26 January 2013	Fayetteville	
Uzbekistan	46.72	Sergey Lovachov	4 March 1984	Gothenburg	
Zambia	46.73	Kennedy Luchembe	21 February 2020	Madrid	
Sri Lanka	46.76	Sugath Thilakaratne	12 February 2001	Vienna	
Philippines	46.77	Trenten Anthony Beram	4 March 2018	Boston	
Belarus	46.78	Aliaksandr Linnik	6 March 2015	Prague	
Saint Vincent	46.79	Kimorie Shearman	28 February 2020	Boston	
Albania	46.83	Franko Burraj	16 February 2020	Istanbul	
Sierra Leone	46.86	Va-Sheku Sheriff	19 February 2017	Birmingham, AL	
South Korea	46.88	Shon Ju-il	27 February 1996	Tianjin	
Iran	46.95	Ali Khadivar	18 February 2018	Istanbul	
Ethiopia	46.96	Alemayehu Gudeta	5 March 1989	Budapest	
Fiji	47.00 yA	Saimoni Tamani	27 February 1971	Pocatello	
Cape Verde	47.03 A	Jordin Andrade	28 February 2015	Albuquerque	
Liberia	47.04	Siraj Williams	9 March 2007	Fayetteville	
Haiti	47.05	Steve Delice	8 March 2008	Boston	
Moldova	47.09	Vadim Zadoynov	10 March 1996	Stockholm	
Finland	47.09	Jussi Heikkilä	2 March 2008	Fayetteville	
South Sudan	47.12	Semi Thiel Deng Thiel	18 January 2026	Toruń	
Bosnia and Herzegovina	47.14	Amel Tuka	21 February 2018	Belgrade	
Bermuda	47.15	Troy Douglas	8 March 1994	Stockholm	
Azerbaijan	47.15	Dmitriy Chumichkin	27 February 2002	Vienna	
New Zealand	47.17	Lex Revell-Lewis	20 March 2026	Toruń	
North Macedonia	47.18	Jovan Stojoski	20 February 2022	Budapest	
Iraq	47.18	Yasir Ali al-Saadi	10 February 2023	Astana	
Guinea	47.21	Amara Conte	10 March 2023	Birmingham, AL	
Georgia	47.26	Mindia Endeladze	14 February 2021	Istanbul	
India	47.33	Amoj Jacob	19 September 2017	Ashgabat	
Namibia	47.35	Dasheek Akwenye	16 February 2008	Nampa	
Cyprus	47.39	Evripides Demosthenous	14 February 1998	Piraeus	
Thailand	47.40	Jukkatip Phocharoen	31 October 2007	Macau	
Vietnam	47.44	Quách Công Lịch	13 February 2016	Birmingham, AL	
Luxembourg	47.49	Vincent Karger	24 January 2015	Kirchberg	
Uruguay	47.50	Andrés Silva	10 March 2006	Moscow	
Oman	47.51	Othman Ali Al-Busaidi	4 March 2019	Tehran	
Mali	47.54 (Note: The Malinese-born sprinter Mamoudou Hanne ran 46.49 in 2011. However, from 2009 or 2010 on he has represented France; his best time still running for Mali was 47.64 on 8 feb 2009)	Fodé Sissoko	26 January 2019	Liévin	
São Tomé and Príncipe	47.55 (Note: Omar Elkhatib has a personal record of 46.99 on 1 March 2024, but represented his homeland São Tomé and Príncipe only until 19 June 2023, after which he ran for Portugal.)	Omar Elkhatib	22 January 2023	Pombal	
Malta	47.55	Graham Pellegrini	10 February 2024	Istanbul	
Lebanon	47.55	Mark Anthony Ibrahim	30 January 2026	Clemson	
Iceland	47.59	Kolbeinn Höður Gunnarsson	1 February 2015	Reykjavík	
Chile	47.71 A	Martín Kouyoumdjian	10 February 2024	Albuquerque	
Mozambique	47.75	Creve Armando Machava	9 February 2020	Sindelfingen	
Madagascar	47.79	Avotriniaina Rakotoarimiandy	1 February 2014	Val-de-Reuil	
Honduras	47.80	Yariel Matute	17 February 2018	College Station	
Peru	47.84 A	Marco Vilca	1 February 2020	Cochabamba	
Egypt	47.87 A	Anas Beshr	3 February 2018	Boulder	
Turks and Caicos	47.90	Colby Jennings	12 March 2021	Birmingham	
Andorra	47.94	Daniel Gómez	6 February 2000	Seville	
Comoros	47.94	Bacar Houmadi Jannot	21 February 2015	Aubière	
Chad	47.99	Ali Faudet	15 February 1992	Bordeaux	
Bolivia	48.06 A	Fernando Copa	1 February 2020	Cochabamba	
Bangladesh	48.10	Mohammad Jahir Rayhan	18 February 2024	Tehran	
Togo	48.19	Ahmed Sangbana	27 February 1999	Blacksburg	
El Salvador	48.21	Takeshi Fujiwara	12 March 2010	Doha	
United Arab Emirates	48.24	Ali Obaid Hassan Shirook	15 February 2008	Doha	
Seychelles	48.29	Ned Azemia	11 January 2019	College Station	
Guam	48.35	Aaron Whitaker	20 February 2016	Nampa	
Tanzania	48.40	Christopher Mbilo	8 March 1991	Seville	
Pakistan	48.40 (Note: not ratified by AFP but recognized by World Athletics)	Nokar Hussain	18 September 2017	Ashgabat	
Eritrea	48.41	Haben Teklemichal	15 February 2025	Magglingen	
Burkina Faso	48.42	Esaie Somda	10 February 2024	Rennes	
Malaysia	48.43	Mohd Zaiful Zainal Abidin	15 February 2008	Doha	
French Polynesia	48.45	Isaac Yaya	10 March 2006	Moscow	
Singapore	48.50	Zubin Muncherji	6 January 2018	Bloomington	
Tajikistan	48.57	Davron Atabaev	18 September 2017	Ashgabat	
Papua New Guinea	48.67	Emmanuel Wanga	14 January 2022	Lincoln	
Cameroon	48.7 h	Emmanuel Bitanga	6 February 1988	Paris	
Hong Kong	48.89	Chan Ka Chun	19 February 2016	Doha	
Guinea-Bissau	48.90	Danilson Ricciuli	27 January 2001	Espinho	
San Marino	48.95	Probo Benvenuti	10 February 2024	Istanbul	
Armenia	48.96	Aram Davtyan	4 March 2011	Paris	
Jordan	49.01	Abdelrahman Abu Al-Hummos	18 September 2017	Ashgabat	
Anguilla	49.02	Aiden Hazzard	16 February 2019	College Station	
Aruba	49.20	Anthony Rasmijn	2 March 2018	Birmingham	
Niger	49.21	Sunday Bada	9 March 1997	Paris	
Mongolia	49.23	Tsendsuren Erdene-Munkh	24 February 1990	Moscow	
Yemen	49.25	Ahmed Al-Yaari	9 January 2023	Doha	
Syria	49.33	Zahr-el-Din El-Najem	8 February 2004	Tehran	
Angola	49.37	Milton Hassany	14 February 2015	Pombal	
Chinese Taipei	49.39	Chen Chih-hsuan	10 February 2006	Pattaya	
Guatemala	49.48	Allan Ayala	20 February 2009	Spearfish	
Central African Republic	49.48	Béranger-Aymard Bossé	24 January 2015	Reims	
Paraguay	49.49 A	Marcos Antonio González	27 January 2024	Cochabamba	
Turkmenistan	49.4 h	Ildar Hojayev	25 January 2013	Ashgabat	
Kosovo	49.59	Astrit Kryeziu	25 February 2016	Istanbul	
Monaco	49.62	Brice Etès	31 January 2015	Lyon	
Macau	49.66	Chao Un Kei	31 October 2007	Macau	
Montenegro	49.74	Srđan Marić	21 February 2018	Belgrade	
Vanuatu	49.92	Tikie Terry Mael	2 March 2018	Birmingham	
Gibraltar	49.97	Jerai Torres	21 January 2018	Sabadell	
Maldives	49.98	Mohamed Naail	2 March 2018	Birmingham	
Norfolk Island	50.14	Jonathan McKee	9 December 1989	Gothenburg	
Rwanda	50.25	Emmanuel Rubayiza	7 March 1997	Paris	
Montserrat	50.32	Julius Morris	6 January 2017	West Lafayette	
Mauritania	50.34	Mandiaye Seck	13 January 2002	Orléans	
Belize	50.35	Brandon Jones	10 December 2010	Princess Anne	
Afghanistan	50.90	Said Gilani	6 February 2016	Hanover	
Brunei	51.02	Ak. Hafiy Tajuddin Rositi	9 March 2012	Istanbul	
Equatorial Guinea	51.04	Juan Cabrera	4 March 2017	Valencia	
Benin	51.20	Yaovi Michael Gougou	9 March 2012	Istanbul	
Liechtenstein	51.33	Fabian Haldner	2 February 2013	Magglingen	
Palestine	51.65	Bahaa Al Farra	9 March 2012	Istanbul	
Suriname	51.67 A	Jurgen Themen	6 February 2016	Alamosa	
Laos	51.70	Khenmanh Chantavong	31 October 2009	Hanoi	

=== Women ===
Country	Time	Athlete	Date	Place	Ref.
Netherlands	49.17	Femke Bol	2 March 2024	Glasgow	
United States	49.48 A	Britton Wilson	11 March 2023	Albuquerque	
Czech Republic	49.59	Jarmila Kratochvílová	7 March 1982	Milan	
Russia	49.68	Natalya Nazarova	18 February 2004	Moscow	
Germany	50.01; 50.84	Sabine Busch (GDR); Helga Arendt (FRG)	2 February 1984; 7 February 1988	Vienna; Karlsruhe	
Great Britain	50.02	Nicola Sanders	3 March 2007	Birmingham	
Bulgaria	50.21	Vanya Stambolova	12 March 2006	Moscow	
Bahamas	50.21	Shaunae Miller-Uibo	13 February 2021	Staten Island	
Ireland	50.33	Rhasidat Adeleke	25 February 2023	Lubbock	
Jamaica	50.47	Dejanea Oakley	14 March 2026	Fayetteville	
Belarus	50.55	Svetlana Usovich	5 March 2005	Madrid	
Romania	50.56	Ionela Târlea	1 March 1998	Valencia	
Nigeria	50.73	Charity Opara	1 February 1998	Stuttgart	
Ukraine	50.81	Olga Bryzgina	14 February 1987	Moscow	
Poland	50.83	Natalia Kaczmarek	19 February 2023	Toruń	
Saint Kitts and Nevis	50.91	Tiandra Ponteen	12 March 2005	Fayetteville	
Grenada	50.92	Hazel-Ann Regis	12 March 2005	Fayetteville	
Mexico	50.93	Ana Gabriela Guevara	6 March 1999	Maebashi	
Spain	50.99	Sandra Myers	10 March 1991	Sevilla	
Norway	51.05	Henriette Jæger	6 February 2024	Toruń	
Uzbekistan	51.22	Marina Shmonina	4 March 1990	Glasgow	
Canada	51.23	Savannah Sutherland	15 March 2025	Virginia Beach	
Kyrgyzstan	51.27	Mariya Pinigina	22 February 1987	Liévin	
Switzerland	51.28	Lea Sprunger	15 February 2018	Toruń	
Austria	51.37	Susanne Gogl-Walli	2 March 2024	Glasgow	
Finland	51.42	Mette Baas	20 March 2026	Toruń	
France	51.44	Marie-José Pérec	18 February 1996	Liévin	
Bahrain	51.45	Kemi Adekoya	19 March 2016	Portland	
Saint Vincent	51.48	Kineke Alexander	10 March 2007	Fayetteville	
Zimbabwe	51.51	Vimbayi Maisvoreva	14 March 2025	Virginia Beach	
Guyana	51.57	Aliyah Abrams	18 March 2022	Belgrade	
U.S. Virgin Islands	51.60	Laverne Jones-Ferrette	3 February 2007	Stuttgart	
Belgium	51.62	Cynthia Bolingo	2 March 2019	Glasgow	
Lithuania	51.63	Modesta Justė Morauskaitė	2 March 2022	Madrid	
Greece	51.68	Fani Chalkia	6 March 2004	Budapest	
Egypt	51.72	Basant Hemida	3 February 2026	Ostrava	
New Zealand	51.81 A	Annalies Kalma	14 February 2026	Reno	
Chad	51.92	Kaltouma Nadjina	10 March 2001	Lisbon	
Cuba	52.02	Indira Terrero	24 February 2013	Metz	
Sweden	52.04	Moa Hjelmer	3 March 2013	Gothenburg	
Gambia	52.06	Sanu Jallow-Lockhart	7 February 2026	Fayetteville	
Colombia	52.12	Ximena Restrepo	9 March 1991	Indianapolis	
Australia	52.17	Maree Holland	4 March 1989	Budapest	
Italy	52.17	Virna De Angeli	10 March 1996	Stockholm	
Haiti	52.21	Marlena Wesh	4 February 2012	New York City	
Slovenia	52.22	Anita Horvat	8 February 2018	Madrid	
China	52.27	Li Yajun	24 February 1996	Beijing	
Malaysia	52.27	Shereen Vallabouy	11 March 2023	Virginia Beach	
Barbados	52.28	Sada Williams	11 February 2022	Fayetteville	
Hungary	52.29	Judit Forgács	8 February 1987	Budapest	
Serbia	52.33	Maja Ćirić	3 February 2022	Ostrava	
Botswana	52.34	Amantle Montsho	12 March 2010	Doha	
Sierra Leone	52.43	Maggie Barrie	14 February 2020	Clemson	
Portugal	52.43	Cátia Azevedo	23 February 2024	Madrid	
Croatia	52.47	Jelica Pavličić	22 February 1976	Munich	
Senegal	52.48	Amy Mbacké Thiam	2 February 2006	Stockholm	
Trinidad and Tobago	52.52	Sparkle Mc Knight	9 March 2013	Fayetteville	
Kazakhstan	52.53	Elina Mikhina	16 February 2018	Oskemen	
Puerto Rico	52.53	Gabby Scott	8 February 2026	Karlsruhe	
Brazil	52.54	Letícia de Souza	10 February 2017	Fayetteville	
Ghana	52.56	Pearl Awanya	9 February 2024	Fayetteville	
Denmark	52.59	Sara Slott Petersen	13 February 2016	Växjö	
Slovakia	52.61	Emma Zapletalová	25 January 2025	Ostrava	
Cameroon	52.62	Mireille Nguimgo	2 March 2003	Clermont-Ferrand	
Latvia	52.66	Gunta Vaičule	1 March 2019	Glasgow	
Zambia	52.68	Kabange Mupopo	18 March 2016	Portland	
Bermuda	52.69	Caitlyn Bobb	3 March 2025	Louisville	
Turks and Caicos	52.72	Yanique Haye-Smith	24 February 2019	Boston	
Lebanon	52.81 A	Rasha Badrani	8 February 2025	Reno	
Cyprus	52.91	Androula Sialou	7 February 2004	Paiania	
Estonia	52.98	Maris Mägi	23 January 2010	Vienna	
Liberia	52.99	Kou Luogon	26 February 2006	Gainesville	
Antigua and Barbuda	53.01	Samantha Edwards	12 February 2016	Boston	
British Virgin Islands	53.01	Ashley Kelly	12 February 2016	Boston	
Turkey	53.04; 53.04; 52.99 X	Pınar Saka; Meliz Redif; Pınar Saka	7 February 2009; 29 January 2011; 11 February 2011	Lincoln; Karlsruhe; New York	
Chile	53.05	Martina Weil	1 February 2025	Ghent	
Luxembourg	53.08	Fanny Arendt	10 January 2026	Kirchberg	
Iceland	53.14; 53.11 (Note: Not recognized by the Icelandic federation)	Guðrún Arnardóttir	26 February 2000; 26 February 1995	Ghent; Baton Rouge	
Uganda	53.17	Scovia Ayikoru	21 February 2023	Birmingham	
Cayman Islands	53.20	Shalysa Wray	25 February 2023	Lubbock	
Togo	53.22	Sandrine Thiébaud-Kangni	2 March 2003	Clermont-Ferrand	
Panama	53.25	Gianna Woodruff	16 February 2024	Fayetteville	
Tunisia	53.34	Awatef Ben Hassine	2 March 2003	Clermont-Ferrand	
Albania	53.34	Klodiana Shala	16 February 2005	Paiania	
Morocco	53.54; 53.45 y	Nezha Bidouane; Nawal El Moutawakel	7 March 1997	Paris; Lincoln	
Suriname	53.56	Letitia Vriesde	19 February 1995	The Hague	
Japan	53.64	Asami Tanno	1 March 2005	Tianjin	
Venezuela	53.65	Luisairys Toledo	8 March 2024	Pittsburg, Kansas	
São Tomé and Príncipe	53.68	Gorete Semedo	10 February 2024	Pombal	
Philippines	53.71	Lauren Hoffman (Note: Filipino-American Lauren Hoffman has represented the Philippines since 1 October 2023.)	9 February 2024	Clemson	
Moldova	53.72	Larisa Glavenco	26 February 1990	Moscow	
Iraq	53.75	Gulustan Mahmood Ieso	1 November 2009	Hanoi	
Saint Lucia	53.82	Verneta Lesforis	20 February 1999	Cedar Falls	
Iran	53.85	Maryam Tousi	18 February 2012	Hangzhou	
India	53.89	Pinki Paramanik	13 November 2005	Pattaya	
Fiji	54.02	Makelesi Batimala	7 March 2008	Valencia	
Mali	54.05	Djénébou Danté	20 February 2021	Miramas	
Ivory Coast	54.08	Louise Ayétotché	6 March 1999	Indianapolis	
Belize	54.11	Lydia Troupe	23 February 2024	Boston	
Syria	54.17; 53.79 X	Mounira Al-Saleh	14 November 2005; 26 February 2010	Pattaya; Tehran	
Kenya	54.21	Ruth Waithera	10 March 1984	Syracuse	
Armenia	54.24	Amaliya Sharoyan	6 March 2015	Prague	
Sudan	54.27	Hiba Mahgoub	16 February 2024	Fayetteville	
Dominica	54.32	Dawn Williams	25 February 1996	Jonesboro	
Vietnam	54.41	Nguyễn Thị Hằng	19 September 2017	Ashgabat	
Algeria	54.44	Loubna Benhadja	1 March 2025	Lynchburg	
Thailand	54.45	Atchima Eng-Chuan	19 September 2017	Ashgabat	
Georgia	54.53	Maia Azarashvili	17 February 1988	Valencia	
Sri Lanka	54.61	Damayanthi Dharsha	14 March 2003	Birmingham	
Guinea	54.77	Asta Dramé	25 February 2012	Aubière	
Argentina	54.79	Cora Olivero	1 March 2003	Valencia	
Malawi	54.82	Ambwene Simukonda	4 February 2012	Birmingham	
South Africa	54.86	Gontse Morake	28 January 2023	Fayetteville	
Indonesia	54.88	Sri Maya Sari	11 February 2023	Astana	
Benin	55.11; 54.26 X	Noélie Yarigo; Bimbo Miel Ayedou	26 January 2014; 9 March 2012	Bordeaux; Istanbul	
Dominican Republic	55.26	Libia Jackson	28 January 2006	State College	
Ecuador	55.28	Paola Sánchez	8 February 2009	Vilafranca del Penedès	
Israel	55.34	Olga Dor-Dogadko	14 February 1999	Ghent	
Namibia	55.40	Tjipekapora Herunga	12 March 2010	Doha	
Papua New Guinea	55.48	Betty Burua	27 February 2011	Baton Rouge	
Bolivia	55.48 A	Cecilia Gómez	5 February 2022	Cochabamba	
Andorra	55.50	Duna Viñals	9 March 2024	Salamanca	
Burkina Faso	55.54	Sita Sibiri	21 March 2025	Nanjing	
Central African Republic	55.63	Emmanuëlle Kogalama	15 February 1998	Bordeaux	
Tajikistan	55.72	Kristina Pronzhenko	19 January 2019	Ust-Kamenogorsk	
Malta	55.77	Janet Richard	18 January 2020	London	
Azerbaijan	55.78	Lamiya Valiyeva	1 March 2025	Oskemen	
Cape Verde	55.84	Vera Barbosa	14 February 2009	Pombal	
North Macedonia	55.84	Drita Islami	4 February 2023	Budapest	
Bosnia and Herzegovina	55.91	Jelena Gajić	24 February 2021	Belgrade	
Anguilla	56.06	Artesha Richardson	18 February 2017	Birmingham	
Congo Republic	56.07	Lasnet Nkouka	19 February 1995	Bordeaux	
South Korea	56.11	Lee Yun-Kyung	18 February 2004	Tianjin	
Comoros	56.15	Salhate Djamalidine	21 January 2005	Eaubonne	
Mozambique	56.18 +	Maria Mutola	12 March 1995	Barcelona	
Honduras	56.31	Heidy Palacios	12 February 2011	Boston	
Mongolia	56.40	Munkhtumen Otgonpurev	6 February 2026	Tianjin	
Costa Rica	56.43	Zoila Stewart	27 February 1999	Lincoln	
Jordan	56.46	Aliya Boshnak	15 February 2020	Boston	
Uruguay	56.57	Claudia Acerenza	8 March 1991	Seville	
Northern Mariana Islands	57.02	Yvonne Bennett	2 February 2013	Nampa	
Turkmenistan	57.0 h	Alyona Petrova	1 December 1997	Rashd	
Congo DR	57.14	Maria Bangala	4 February 2022	Louisville	
Monaco	57.18	Marie-Charlotte Gastaud	24 January 2026	Miramas	
Aruba	57.24	Eljoenai Wehl	28 February 2026	Ashland	
Chinese Taipei	57.38 A	Renee Yang	28 January 2023	Albuquerque	
Montenegro	57.53	Jovana Kljajević	21 February 2007	Piraeus	
Pakistan	57.75	Bushra Parveen	13 November 2005	Pattaya	
Kosovo	57.85	Vijona Kryeziu	27 February 2016	Istanbul	
Guinea-Bissau	57.86	Graciela Martins	7 January 2012	Pombal	
Angola	58.19	Milclénia Francisco	27 February 2016	Pombal	
Gabon	58.28	Pierrick-Linda Moulin	10 December 2023	Lyon	
Seychelles	58.52 A	Natasha Chetty	9 February 2024	Albuquerque	
Macau	58.85	Lam Ka Im	30 October 2007	Macau	
Singapore	59.14	Laavinia Jaiganth	6 February 2026	Tianjin	
San Marino	59.28	Beatrice Berti	30 January 2021	Padova	
Equatorial Guinea	59.42	Marlene Mevong Mba	14 February 2009	San Sebastián	
Liechtenstein	59.53	Maria Ritter	21 February 1976	Munich	
Libya	59.63	Najla Aqdeir Ali Salem	1 March 2019	Glasgow	
Guam	1:00.08	Christina Francisco	18 March 2016	Portland	
Gibraltar	1:00.23	Norcady Reyes	30 December 2023	Antequera	
Mauritius	1:00.29	Ananxya Lebrasse	11 February 2024	Metz	
Myanmar	1:00.78	Kay Khine Lwin	12 March 2010	Doha	
Rwanda	1:00.96	Fanny Dusabimana	19 January 2020	Västeras	
Kuwait	1:01.54 OT	Danah Al-Nasrallah	18 February 2011	Allendale	
Bangladesh	1:01.69	Sumi Akther	9 February 2018	Tehran	
Oman	1:02.43	Hanaa Al Qassimi	19 February 2016	Doha	
Afghanistan	1:12.16	Yalda Amini	11 February 2018	Lahti	
