= 2021 European Athletics U23 Championships – Women's 400 metres =

Women's 400 metres at the 2021 European Athletics U23 Championships
- Venue: Kadriorg Stadium, Tallinn
- Dates: 8–10 July
- Competitors: 26 from 18 nations
- Winning time: 51.19

Medalists
gold medal	Lada Vondrová	Czech Republic
silver medal	Barbora Malíková	Czech Republic
bronze medal	Silke Lemmens	Switzerland

The women's 400 metres event at the 2021 European Athletics U23 Championships was held in Tallinn, Estonia, at Kadriorg Stadium on 8, 9 and 10 July.

== Records ==
Prior to the competition, the records were as follows:

European U23 record	Marita Koch (GDR)	48.60	Turin, Italy	4 August 1979
Championship U23 record	Olga Zaytseva (RUS)	50.72	Erfurt, Germany	16 July 2005

== Results ==
=== Round 1 ===
Qualification rule: First 3 in each heat (Q) and the next 4 fastest (q) advance to the Semi-Finals.

Rank	Heat	Name	Nationality	Time	Notes
1	1	Silke Lemmens	Switzerland	52.73	Q, NU23R
2	3	Lada Vondrová	Czech Republic	53.03	Q
3	1	Barbora Malíková	Czech Republic	53.09	Q
4	4	Sokhna Lacoste	France	53.26	Q
5	4	Mona Mayer	Germany	53.32	Q
6	3	Asnāte Kalniņa	Latvia	53.44	Q, PB
7	4	Mette Baas	Finland	53.46	Q
8	3	Anna Polinari	Italy	53.53	Q
9	4	Samantha Zago	Italy	53.62	q
10	3	Luna Thiel	Germany	53.63	q
11	2	Alessandra Bonora	Italy	53.69	Q
12	2	Kinga Gacka	Poland	54.04	Q
13	1	Andrea Jiménez	Spain	54.09	Q
14	3	Aleksandra Formella	Poland	54.10	q
15	3	Maryana Shostak	Ukraine	54.17	q, SB
16	1	Veronika Drljačić	Croatia	54.28	
17	2	Yasmin Liverpool	Great Britain	54.45	Q
18	2	Asteria Uzo Limai	Belarus	54.82	
19	4	Veronica Vancardo	Switzerland	54.89	
20	2	Věra Holubářová	Czech Republic	54.92	
21	2	Julia Niederberger	Switzerland	54.96	=PB
22	1	Elif Polat	Turkey	55.11	
23	4	Josefine Tomine Eriksen	Norway	55.77	
24	1	Hanna Répássy	Hungary	55.86	
25	2	Noragia Catherine Johnson	Greece	56.67	
26	3	Natália Bučičová	Slovakia	59.63	
	1	Alina Luchshava	Belarus	DNS	

=== Semifinals ===
Qualification rule: First 3 in each heat (Q) and the next 2 fastest (q) advance to the Final.

Rank	Heat	Name	Nationality	Time	Notes
1	2	Barbora Malíková	Czech Republic	52.41	Q
2	1	Lada Vondrová	Czech Republic	52.58	Q
3	1	Sokhna Lacoste	France	52.71	Q
4	2	Silke Lemmens	Switzerland	53.07	Q
5	1	Mona Mayer	Germany	53.27	Q
6	1	Samantha Zago	Italy	53.48	q
7	2	Mette Baas	Finland	53.53	Q
8	2	Kinga Gacka	Poland	53.55	q
9	1	Andrea Jiménez	Spain	53.67	
10	1	Asnāte Kalniņa	Latvia	53.90	
11	1	Anna Polinari	Italy	54.07	
12	2	Alessandra Bonora	Italy	54.14	
13	2	Luna Thiel	Germany	54.35	
14	2	Maryana Shostak	Ukraine	54.39	
15	1	Aleksandra Formella	Poland	54.41	
16	2	Yasmin Liverpool	Great Britain	56.27	

=== Final ===
Rank	Lane	Name	Nationality	Time	Notes
1st place, gold medalist(s)	6	Lada Vondrová	Czech Republic	51.19	PB
2nd place, silver medalist(s)	3	Barbora Malíková	Czech Republic	51.23	=PB
3rd place, bronze medalist(s)	5	Silke Lemmens	Switzerland	52.09	NU23R
4	4	Sokhna Lacoste	France	52.19	PB
5	7	Mona Mayer	Germany	52.25	PB
6	2	Kinga Gacka	Poland	52.53	PB
7	8	Mette Baas	Finland	53.26	PB
8	1	Samantha Zago	Italy	53.57	
