= Athletics at the 2025 Summer World University Games – Women's 400 metres =

Women's 400 metres at the 2025 Summer World University Games
- Venue: Lohrheidestadion
- Location: Bochum, Germany
- Dates: 21 July (heats); 22 July (semi-finals); 23 July (final)
- Competitors: 42 from 34 nations
- Winning time: 51.52 SB

Medalists
gold medal	Barbora Malíková	Czech Republic
silver medal	Veronika Drljacic	Croatia
bronze medal	Alessandra Bonora	Italy

The women's 400 metres event at the 2025 Summer World University Games was held in Bochum, Germany, at Lohrheidestadion on 21, 22 and 23 July.

== Records ==
Prior to the competition, the records were as follows:

Record	Athlete (nation)	Time (s)	Location	Date
Games record	Ionela Târlea (ROU)	49.88	Palma de Mallorca, Spain	12 July 1999

== Results ==
=== Heats ===
First 3 in each heat (Q) and the next 6 fastest (q) qualified for the semi-finals.

==== Heat 1 ====
Place	Athlete	Nation	Time	Notes
1	Catia Gubelmann	Switzerland	52.68	Q
2	Maryana Shostak	Ukraine	52.76	Q, SB
3	Alessandra Bonora	Italy	53.39	Q
4	Letícia Lima	Brazil	53.96	q
5	Hana Grobovšek	Slovenia	54.64	PB
6	Itzel Cervantes	Mexico	56.54	
7	Evelīna Krakope	Latvia	60.74	
8	Malaika Shahzadi	Pakistan	64.04	

==== Heat 2 ====
Place	Athlete	Nation	Time	Notes
1	Jana Lakner	Germany	52.26	Q
2	Kinga Gacka	Poland	53.12	Q
3	Precious Molepo	South Africa	53.48	Q
4	Benny Nontanam	Thailand	53.49	q
5	Paige Willems	Canada	54.27	q
6	Chelsea Cassiopea Evali Bopulas	Malaysia	56.36	
7	Martha Spiteri	Malta	56.60	

==== Heat 3 ====
Place	Athlete	Nation	Time	Notes
1	Aleksandra Formella	Poland	52.66	Q
2	Favour Okpali	Canada	52.96	Q
3	Isabel Neal	New Zealand	53.81	Q
4	Alexandra Zalyubovskaya	Kazakhstan	54.02	q
5	Kaitesi Ertzgaard	Norway	55.04	
6	Isabelle Skelton	Great Britain	55.65	

==== Heat 4 ====
Place	Athlete	Nation	Time	Notes
1	Veronika Drljacic	Croatia	52.80	Q
2	Annkathrin Hoven	Germany	53.35	Q
3	Lakshima Mendis	Sri Lanka	53.75	Q
4	Batisane Kennekae	Botswana	54.35	q
5	Jonbibi Hukmova	Uzbekistan	55.21	
6	Luciana Quinto	Colombia	57.03	
7	Dorothy Abeja	Uganda	58.87	

==== Heat 5 ====
Place	Athlete	Nation	Time	Notes
1	Charlee Crawford	United States	53.52	Q
2	Barbora Malíková	Czech Republic	53.62	Q
3	Natasha Harrison	Great Britain	54.13	Q
4	Laavinia Jaiganth	Singapore	55.90	
5	Iris Morales	Mexico	56.39	
6	Chioma Christabel Offor	Nigeria	59.81	
7	Christine Kabwe	Zambia	63.87	

==== Heat 6 ====
Place	Athlete	Nation	Time	Notes
1	Marlie Viljoen	South Africa	53.48	Q
2	Annalies Kalma	New Zealand	53.89	Q
3	Chinenye Onuorah	Thailand	54.42	Q
4	Virág Simon	Hungary	54.60	q
5	Edanur Tulum	Turkey	55.55	
6	Pamela Nicol Barreto	Ecuador	56.64	
7	Kim Thanh Nguyen Thi	Vietnam	58.28	

=== Semi-finals ===
First 2 in each heat (Q) and the next 2 fastest (q) qualified for the final.

==== Heat 1 ====
Place	Athlete	Nation	Time	Notes
1	Veronika Drljacic	Croatia	52.13	Q
2	Catia Gubelmann	Switzerland	52.44	Q
3	Kinga Gacka	Poland	52.86	=SB
4	Annkathrin Hoven	Germany	52.95	
5	Alexandra Zalyubovskaya	Kazakhstan	53.15	
6	Precious Molepo	South Africa	53.30	
7	Isabel Neal	New Zealand	53.72	
8	Paige Willems	Canada	54.82	

==== Heat 2 ====
Place	Athlete	Nation	Time	Notes
1	Barbora Malíková	Czech Republic	52.46	Q
2	Aleksandra Formella	Poland	52.62	Q
3	Favour Okpali	Canada	52.84	q
4	Marlie Viljoen	South Africa	52.99	
5	Benny Nontanam	Thailand	53.68	
6	Lakshima Mendis	Sri Lanka	54.26	
7	Natasha Harrison	Great Britain	54.49	
8	Batisane Kennekae	Botswana	55.33	

==== Heat 3 ====
Place	Athlete	Nation	Time	Notes
1	Jana Lakner	Germany	52.37	Q
2	Alessandra Bonora	Italy	52.63	Q
3	Charlee Crawford	United States	52.82	q
4	Maryana Shostak	Ukraine	52.95	
5	Annalies Kalma	New Zealand	53.63	
6	Chinenye Onuorah	Thailand	54.11	
7	Virág Simon	Hungary	54.46	
8	Letícia Lima	Brazil	54.48	

=== Final ===
Place	Athlete	Nation	Time	Notes
1st place, gold medalist(s)	Barbora Malíková	Czech Republic	51.52	SB
2nd place, silver medalist(s)	Veronika Drljacic	Croatia	51.66	PB
3rd place, bronze medalist(s)	Alessandra Bonora	Italy	52.41	
4	Aleksandra Formella	Poland	52.56	
5	Jana Lakner	Germany	52.57	
6	Catia Gubelmann	Switzerland	52.83	
7	Charlee Crawford	United States	52.85	
8	Favour Okpali	Canada	53.87	
