= Maia Ramsden =

New Zealand middle-distance runner

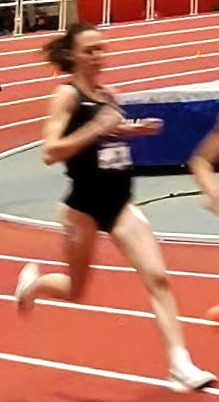
- Ramsden at the 2024 NCAA Division I Indoor Track and Field Championships

Personal information
- Nationality: New Zealand
- Born: 23 March 2002 (age 24) New York City, New York, United States

Sport
- Sport: Athletics
- College team: Harvard Crimson
- Coached by: Alex Gibby

Achievements and titles
- Personal bests: 1500 m: 4:02.20 NR (Paris 2024); Mile: 4:24.79 (Folksam 2024); 3000 m: 10:53.33 (Timaru 2019); 5000 m: 15:29.06 (Lexington 2024); Indoors; 1500 m: 4:06.51 NR (Glasgow 2024); Mile: 4:21.56 NR (Boston 2025); 3000 m: 8:46.84 (Boston 2023)

Maia Ramsden (born 23 March 2002) is a track and field and cross-country athlete from New Zealand.

== Early and personal life ==
Ramsden was born in New York to Mark and Margot Ramsden. Her father had a career in foreign affairs for the New Zealand Government, and was assigned to the United Nations at the time of her birth. From the age of three, she was raised in Wellington, New Zealand. She also studied at International Schools in Suva, Fiji, Solomon Islands and Addis Ababa. Ramsden studied history and literature, with a focus on the Pacific at Harvard University, graduating in 2024. She has siblings Griffyn and Isla.

== College career ==
Ramsden was U20 New Zealand national champion over 800m and 1500m in March 2020.

Competing indoors in Boston in February 2023, she ran a personal best time of 4:30.19 for the mile, which placed her second on the all-time New Zealand women’s mile lists behind only Kim Smith, who ran 4:24.14 in 2008.

Ramsden won the 1500m title at the 2023 NCAA Outdoors Championships, held in Austin, Texas in June 2023, in a then personal best time of 4:08.60. In doing so, she became the second New Zealander to win a track title at an outdoor NCAA Championships, and the sixth overall all-time female New Zealander at the distance. She also became the first winner from Harvard in the event since 1986.

In October 2023 Ramsden signed an NIL deal with On.

In her senior year of cross country, Ramsden finished 10th overall at the 2023 NCAA Cross Country Championships.

In February 2024, Ramsden ran a personal mile best of 4:24.83 in the Wannamaker mile at the Millrose Games in New York. She qualified for the final of the women's 1500 metres race at the 2024 World Athletics Indoor Championships in Glasgow, with a national indoor record time of 4:06.51. She finished tenth in the final with a time of 4:06.88. At the 2024 NCAA Division I Indoor Track and Field Championships on 9 March 2024, Ramsden set a new meet record to win the mile in 4:25.13. The next month, she was part of a Harvard distance medley relay team including Sophia Gorriaran and Victoria Bossong, that ran 10:37.55 at the Penn Relays to set a US college record on April 26, 2024. On 18 May at the Los Angeles Grand Prix she broke the national 1500m record with 4:02.58.

On 8 June 2024 Ramsden retained her NCAA 1500m title finishing ahead of compatriot Kimberley May.

== Professional career ==
Ramsden joined the Boulder, Colorado-based On Athletics Club in June 2024. She competed in the 1500 metres at the 2024 Summer Olympics in Paris in August 2024, running a national record time of 4:02.20 in the semi-finals, but did not progress to the final. On 21 August she lowered her mile best to 4.24.79, in Borås, Sweden.

On 2 March 2025, Ramsden ran 4.21.56 for a mile indoors at Boston to set an absolute New Zealand record, bettering Kim Smith's indoor mark of 4:24.14 and her own outdoor best of 4:24.79.

In March 2025, she was named in the New Zealand team for the 2025 World Athletics Indoor Championships in Nanjing. Ramsden placed 16th overall at 2025 World Athletics Indoor Championships – Women's 1500 metres in 4:14.89.
