= Norcady Reyes =

Gibraltarian international athletics competitor

Personal information
- Born: 30 October 2003 (age 22) Gibraltar

Sport
- Country: Gibraltar
- Sport: athletics
- Event(s): 200m and 400m
- University team: Loughborough University

Norcady Reyes (born 30 October 2003) is a Gibraltarian international athletics competitor in 200m and 400m. As of 2023, she holds the Gibraltar national record in the 400m. She previously held the record in the 200m.

== Biography ==
Reyes was born on 30 October 2003 in Gibraltar.

In 2020, Reyes broke the Gibraltar 200m indoor record for under 18s, recording a time of 28.47 seconds. Her record was broken in January 2025 by Charlotte Peat who recorded a time of 27.84 seconds.

In 2021, she participated in the Small States of Europe team in the European Athletic Team Championships in Serravalle, San Marino. Reyes was a member of the gold medal winning 4 × 400 m relay team at the event. At the 2022 European Athletics Championships – Women's 400 metres Reyes placed last.

In December 2023, Reyes broke the Gibraltar under 23 record, Gibraltar senior women’s national record and her own personal best in the 400m indoor track, at 60.23 seconds, and won the Gibraltar Athletics Open Championship.

In 2023, Reyes also competed at the 2023 Island Games at Footes Lane in St. Peter Port, Guernsey, coming 3rd in the first heat of the 400m, 6th in the second heat and 8th in the semi final. She came last in the 2023 European Athletics Indoor Championships – Women's 400 metres in Istanbul, Turkey.

As of 2024, Reyes was a member of the Loughborough's University athletics team.
