= List of New Zealand records in athletics =

The following are the national records in athletics in New Zealand. Those maintained by New Zealand's national athletics federation, Athletics New Zealand (ANZ), are the official records. This list also includes those listed by the IAAF but not recognised by ANZ as well as the best performances from lists maintained by other individuals and organisations.

== Outdoor ==
Key to tables: Awaiting ratification Record not kept by ANZ Not ratified or later rescinded by ANZ

=== Men ===
Event	Record	Athlete	Date	Meet	Place	Ref.
60 m	6.50 (+1.6 m/s)	Tiaan Whelpton	25 January 2025	ACT Open Championships	Canberra, Australia	
100 m	10.08 (−0.3 m/s)	Eddie Osei-Nketia	15 July 2022	World Championships	Eugene, United States	
200 m	20.35 (+1.2 m/s)	Tommy Te Puni	21 February 2026	International Track Meet	Christchurch, New Zealand	
400 m	45.87	Lex Revell-Lewis	14 March 2026	Adelaide Invitational	Adelaide, Australia	
800 m	1:44.04	James Preston	25 May 2024		Pfungstadt, Germany	
1000 m	2:16.57	John Walker	1 July 1980	Bislett Games	Oslo, Norway	
1500 m	3:29.66	Nick Willis	17 July 2015	Herculis	Fontvieille, Monaco	
Mile	3:49.08	John Walker	7 July 1982	Bislett Games	Oslo, Norway	
Mile (road)	3:56.01	Sam Tanner	19 September 2026	World Road Running Championships	Copenhagen, Denmark	
Mile (road)	3:53.8 h	John Walker	18 December 1982		Whanganui, New Zealand	
Mile (road)	3:51.58 a	John Walker	3 September 1983	New York Fifth Avenue Mile	New York City, United States	
2000 m	4:51.4 (Note: by federation source; 4:51.52 by IAAF source)	John Walker	30 June 1976	Bislett Games	Oslo, Norway	
3000 m	7:36.91	Nick Willis	17 June 2014	Golden Spike Ostrava	Ostrava, Czech Republic	
5000 m	13:10.19	Adrian Blincoe	20 July 2008	KBC Night of Athletics	Heusden-Zolder, Belgium	
5 km (road)	13:36	Geordie Beamish	16 April 2022	B.A.A. 5K	Boston, United States	
10,000 m	27:30.90	Jake Robertson	13 April 2018	Commonwealth Games	Gold Coast, Australia	
10 km (road)	27:28	Zane Robertson	9 October 2016	Grand 10 Berlin	Berlin, Germany	
10 km (road)	27:28	Jake Robertson	31 March 2018 (Note: 1 April 2018 by IAAF profile, probably false)	Crescent City Classic	New Orleans, United States	
15 km (road)	42:17+	Zane Robertson	1 February 2015	Kagawa Marugame Half Marathon	Marugame, Japan	
20,000 m (track)	59:28.6+	Bill Baillie	24 August 1963		Auckland, New Zealand	
20 km (road)	56:40+	Zane Robertson	1 February 2015	Kagawa Marugame Half Marathon	Marugame, Japan	
One hour	20190 m	Bill Baillie	24 August 1963		Auckland, New Zealand	
Half marathon	59:47	Zane Robertson	1 February 2015	Kagawa Marugame Half Marathon	Marugame, Japan	
25,000 m (track)	1:16:29+	Jack Foster	15 August 1971		Hamilton, New Zealand	
25 km (road)	1:15:12+	Zane Robertson	7 July 2019	Gold Coast Marathon	Gold Coast, Australia	
30,000 m (track)	1:32:18.6	Jack Foster	15 August 1971		Hamilton, New Zealand	
30 km (road)	1:30:08+	Jake Robertson	21 October 2018	Toronto Marathon	Toronto, Canada	
Marathon	2:08:19	Zane Robertson	7 July 2019	Gold Coast Marathon	Gold Coast, Australia	
100 km	6:38:00	Russell Prince	27 October 1990		Duluth, United States	
110 m hurdles	13.67 (+0.2 m/s)	Joshua Hawkins	2 April 2023	Australian Championships	Brisbane, Australia	
400 m hurdles	49.33	Cameron French	27 January 2018	AACT Championships	Canberra, Australia	
2000 m steeplechase	5:24.06	Peter Renner	19 July 1986		Birmingham, United Kingdom	
3000 m steeplechase	8:09.64	Geordie Beamish	7 July 2024	Meeting de Paris	Paris, France	
High jump	2.36 m	Hamish Kerr	10 August 2024	Olympic Games	Paris, France	
Pole vault	5.51 m	Paul Gibbons	25 January 1992; 9 July 1997		North Shore City, New Zealand; Blackburn, United Kingdom	
Long jump	8.05 m	Bob Thomas	20 January 1968		Whangārei, New Zealand	
Triple jump	17.01 m A (±0.0 m/s)	Ethan Olivier	25 May 2024	ACNW League 10	Potchefstroom, South Africa	
Shot put	22.90 m	Tom Walsh	5 October 2019	World Championships	Doha, Qatar	
Discus throw	68.10 m	Connor Bell	14 April 2024	Oklahoma Throws Series World Invitational	Ramona, United States	
Hammer throw	73.10 m	Angus Cooper	23 January 1994		Hamilton, New Zealand	
Hammer throw	73.96 m	Angus Cooper	17 June 1989		Cleveland, United States	
Javelin throw	88.20 m	Gavin Lovegrove	5 July 1996	Bislett Games	Oslo, Norway	
Decathlon	8359 pts h (Note: by IAAF source, with additional hand-timing for 100m (10.6) and 400m (49.4) Poelman scored 8366 pts, which is recognised by federation)	Simon Poelman	21–22 March 1987		Christchurch, New Zealand	
Decathlon	100m (wind) / Long jump (wind) / Shot put / High jump / 400m / 110m H (wind) / Discus / Pole vault / Javelin / 1500m; 10.87 / 7.34 m / 15.11 m / 2.06 m / 49.54 / 14.1 / 46.66 m / 4.95 m / 56.94 m / 4:27.2					
3000 m walk (track)	11:15.20	Quentin Rew	23 January 2015	Capital Classic Meeting	Wellington, New Zealand	
5000 m walk (track)	19:21.26	Scott Nelson	8 March 1997		Auckland, New Zealand	
20,000 m walk (track)	1:25:53.8	Craig Barrett	19 July 1998		North Shore City, New Zealand	
20 km walk (road)	1:21:12 (Note: by official result source; 1:21:21 by federation, probably mistake)	Quentin Rew	19 February 2017	Oceania Race Walking Championships	Adelaide, Australia	
Two hours walk (track)	27820 m+	Craig Barrett	19 July 1998		North Shore City, New Zealand	
30,000 m walk (track)	2:09:20.4	Craig Barrett	19 July 1998		North Shore City, New Zealand	
50,000 m walk (track)	3:52:35.55	Craig Barrett	17 March 2002		Christchurch, New Zealand	
50 km walk (road)	3:46:29	Quentin Rew	13 August 2017	World Championships	London, United Kingdom	
2 Hours walk	27820 m	Craig Barrett	19 July 1998		North Shore City, New Zealand	
4 × 100 m relay	38.99	New Zealand; Dallas Roberts; David Falealili; James Dolphin; Chris Donaldson	19 November 2005 (Note: by federation source; 20 November 2005 by IAAF source)		Sydney, Australia	
4 × 200 m relay	1:23.82	Donald McDonald; Dallas Roberts; Gene Pateman; Craig Bearda	25 January 2004		North Shore City, New Zealand	
4 × 400 m relay	3:05.84	New Zealand; Shaun Farrell; Nick Cowan; Darren Dale; Mark Keddell	21 August 1993	World Championships	Stuttgart, Germany	
4 × 800 m relay	7:27.2 h	Stephen Lunn; Dick Tayler; Stuart Melville; Bruce Hunter	17 March 1971		Dunedin, New Zealand	
4 × 1500 m relay	14:50.2 h	Stuart Melville; Rod Dixon; Dick Quax; John Walker	17 May 1975		Auckland, New Zealand	
4 × 1500 m relay	14:40.4 h	New Zealand; Tony Polhill 3:42.9; John Walker 3:40.4; Rod Dixon 3:41.2; Dick Quax 3:35.9	22 August 1973	Bislett Games	Oslo, Norway	
4 × mile relay	15:59.57	Tony Rogers; John Bowden; Mike Gilchrist; John Walker	2 March 1983		Auckland, New Zealand	
Ekiden relay	2:00:56	New Zealand; Peter Renner; David Rush; Paul Smith; Kerry Rodger; Rex Wilson	15 December 1991	International Chiba Ekiden	Chiba, Japan	

=== Women ===
Event	Record	Athlete	Date	Meet	Place	Ref.
100 y	10.11+ (+0.5 m/s)	Zoe Hobbs	11 March 2023	Sydney Track Classic	Sydney, Australia	
100 m	10.93 (+1.0 m/s)	Zoe Hobbs	28 July 2026	Commonwealth Games	Glasgow, United Kingdom	
200 m	22.81 (+1.8 m/s)	Rosie Elliott	19 February 2023		Christchurch, New Zealand	
400 m	51.60	Kim Robertson	19 January 1980		Christchurch, New Zealand	
600 m	1:26.72	Angie Smit	5 July 2012	Meeting de la Province de Liège	Liège, Belgium	
800 m	1:58.25	Toni Hodgkinson	27 July 1996	Olympic Games	Atlanta, United States	
1000 m	2:37.28	Angela Petty	15 August 2015	Juntendo Track Meet	Inzai, Japan	
1500 m	4:02.20	Maia Ramsden	8 August 2024	Olympic Games	Paris, France	
Mile	4:24.79	Maia Ramsden	21 August 2024	Folksam GP	Borås, Sweden	
Mile (road)	4:46.8 h	Laura Nagel	3 May 2024		Rotorua, New Zealand	
Mile (road)	4:37.7 h Wo	Angie Petty	8 February 2016	Christchurch Street Mile	Christchurch, New Zealand	
2000 m	5:44.67	Anne Hare	11 July 1986		Crystal Palace, United Kingdom	
3000 m	8:35.31	Kim Smith	25 July 2007	Herculis	Fontvieille, Monaco	
5000 m	14:45.93 (Note: Outdoor best; indoor mark ratified as absolute record)	Kim Smith	11 July 2008	Golden Gala	Rome, Italy	
5 km (road)	14:48	Kim Smith	13 March 2013		Westfield, United States	
10,000 m	30:35.54	Kim Smith	4 May 2008		Stanford, United States	
10 km (road)	31:33	Anne Hannam	22 October 1988		Bowling Green, United States	
15 km (road)	48:14	Anne Hannam	29 October 1988		Tulsa, United States	
10 miles (road)	51:04+	Kim Smith	18 September 2011	Philadelphia Half Marathon	Philadelphia, United States	
20 km (road)	1:03:58+	Kim Smith	18 September 2011	Philadelphia Half Marathon	Philadelphia, United States	
Half marathon	1:07:11 Mx	Kim Smith	18 September 2011	Philadelphia Half Marathon	Philadelphia, United States	
Half marathon	1:09:18 Wo	Georgie Grgec	20 September 2026	World Road Running Championships	Copenhagen, Denmark	
25 km (road)	1:24:15+	Kim Smith	25 April 2010	London Marathon	London, United Kingdom	
30 km (road)	1:41:43+	Kim Smith	25 April 2010	London Marathon	London, United Kingdom	
Marathon	2:25:21	Kim Smith	25 April 2010	London Marathon	London, United Kingdom	
100 km (road)	8:02:15	Wynnie Cosgrove	15 May 1999		Chavagnes-en-Paillers, France	
100 m hurdles	13.10 (+1.0 m/s)	Andrea Miller	6 June 2009		Geneva, Switzerland	
100 m hurdles	13.10 (+0.8 m/s)	Andrea Miller	4 July 2009		Oordegem, Belgium	
100 m hurdles	13.10 (+0.8 m/s)	Rochelle Coster	3 April 2016	Australian Championships	Sydney, Australia	
400 m hurdles	55.44	Portia Bing	5 March 2022	New Zealand Championships	Hastings, New Zealand	
3000 m steeplechase	9:32.54	Kate McIlroy	22 July 2006	KBC Night of Athletics	Heusden-Zolder, Belgium	
High jump	1.92 m	Tania Dixon	26 January 1991		Dunedin, New Zealand	
Pole vault	4.94 m	Eliza McCartney	17 July 2018		Jockgrim, Germany	
Long jump	6.68 m (+1.0 m/s)	Chantal Brunner	1 March 1997	Melbourne Track Classic	Melbourne, Australia	
Long jump	6.68 m (+0.7 m/s)	Chantal Brunner	25 March 2001		Brisbane, Australia	
Triple jump	13.91 m (±0.0 m/s)	Nneka Okpala	2 April 2016	Australian Championships	Sydney, Australia	
Shot put	21.24 m	Valerie Adams	29 August 2011	World Championships	Daegu, South Korea	
Discus throw	68.52 m	Beatrice Faumuina	4 July 1997	Bislett Games	Oslo, Norway	
Hammer throw	74.61 m	Lauren Bruce	20 May 2021	Tucson Elite Classic	Tucson, United States	
Javelin throw	63.26 m	Tori Peeters	21 May 2023	Golden Grand Prix	Yokohama, Japan	
Heptathlon	6278 pts	Joanne Henry	29 February – 1 March 1992		Auckland, New Zealand	
Heptathlon	100m H (wind) / High jump / Shot put / 200m (wind) / Long jump (wind) / Javelin / 800m; 13.93 / 1.75 m / 12.91 m / 24.60w / 6.51 m / 43.65 m / 2:08.72					
3000 m walk (track)	12:25.4 h	Anne Judkins	1 June 1992		Auckland, New Zealand	
5000 m walk (track)	20:59.7	Anne Judkins	1 July 1992		Brunflo, Sweden	
10,000 m walk (track)	43:01.60	Anne Judkins	4 July 1992		Örnsköldsvik, Sweden	
10 km walk (road)	45:28	Anne Judkins	3 August 1992	Olympic Games	Barcelona, Spain	
20,000 m walk (track)	1:39:54.2	Linn Murphy	21 November 1993		Auckland, New Zealand	
20 km walk (road)	1:31:32	Alana Barber	5 May 2018	IAAF World Race Walking Team Championships	Taicang, China	
30 km walk (road)	2:45:38	Laura Langley	18 May 2025	Athletics Victoria Walking Championships	Melbourne, Australia	
50 km walk (road)						
4 × 100 m relay	43.79	New Zealand; Anna Percy; Zoe Hobbs; Georgia Hulls; Livvy Wilson	4 June 2022	Pre-Oceania Mackay Meeting	Mackay, Australia	
4 × 400 m relay	3:34.62	New Zealand; Portia Bing; Zoe Ballantyne; Brooke Cull; Louise Jones	1 August 2014	Commonwealth Games	Glasgow, Great Britain	
Ekiden relay	2:15:49	New Zealand; Marguerite Buist / 5 km Jacqueline Goodman / 10 km Anne Hannam / 5 km Sonia Barry / 10 km Lesley Ryan / 5 km Lorraine Moller / 7.195 km	18 December 1988	International Chiba Ekiden	Chiba, Japan	

=== Mixed ===
Event	Record	Athletes	Date	Meet	Place	Ref.
4 × 100 m relay	42.43	New Zealand; Joshua Lotsu; Georgia Hulls; Lex Revell-Lewis; Samantha Lathwood	28 March 2026	Maurie Plant Meet	Melbourne, Australia	
4 × 400 m relay	3:26.12	New Zealand; Angus Lyver; Amelie Fairclough; Lex Revell-Lewis; Madeleine Waddell	7 June 2024	Oceania Championships	Suva, Fiji	

== Indoor ==
=== Men ===
Event	Record	Athlete	Date	Meet	Place	Ref.
50 m	5.6 h	Craig Daly	2 October 1971		Invercargill, New Zealand	
55 m	6.22	Dean Wise	7 February 1998		Norman, United States	
60 m	6.58	Tiaan Whelpton	20 March 2026	World Championships	Toruń, Poland	
200 m	21.01	Chris Donaldson	5 March 1999	World Championships	Maebashi, Japan	
400 m	47.17	Lex Revell-Lewis	20 March 2026	World Championships	Toruń, Poland	
500 m	1:04.54	Richard Jones	22 January 2005		Boston, United States	
600 m	1:18.29	Björn Jansen	1998		United States	
800 m	1:46.44	James Harding	20 February 2026	Arkansas Qualifier	Fayetteville, United States	
1000 m	2:19.39	Sam Idiens	7 February 2026	Doc Hale Virginia Tech Invitational	Blacksburg, United States	
1500 m	3:33.25+	Sam Ruthe	31 January 2026	BU John Thomas Terrier Classic	Boston, United States	
Mile	3:48.88	Sam Ruthe	31 January 2026	BU John Thomas Terrier Classic	Boston, United States	
2000 m	5:03.8 h	John Walker	7 February 1981		Louisville, United States	
3000 m	7:36.22	Geordie Beamish	11 February 2023	Millrose Games	New York City, United States	
3000 m	7:34.88+	Geordie Beamish	11 February 2024	Millrose Games	New York City, United States	
Two miles	8:05.73	Geordie Beamish	11 February 2024	Millrose Games	New York City, United States	
5000 m	13:04.33	Geordie Beamish	26 January 2024	BU John Thomas Terrier Classic	Boston, United States	
50 m hurdles	6.7 h	Anthony Wright	2 October 1971		Napier, New Zealand	
60 m hurdles	8.20	Cody Thomas	11 February 2017	MSSU Lion Invitational	Joplin, United States	
High jump	2.36 m	Hamish Kerr	3 March 2024	World Championships	Glasgow, United Kingdom	
Pole vault	5.25 m	Nick Southgate	21 May 2016		Jamor, Portugal	
Long jump	7.77 m	Grant Birkinshaw	29 December 1970		Seattle, United States	
Triple jump	15.59 m	Welrè Olivier	8 January 2022	Gene Edmonds Invitational	West Lafayette, United States	
Shot put	22.31 m	Tom Walsh	3 March 2018	World Championships	Birmingham, United Kingdom	
Shot put	22.31 m	Tom Walsh	19 March 2022	World Championships	Štark Arena, Belgrade, Serbia	
Weight throw	20.56 m	Angus Cooper	11 March 1988		Oklahoma City, United States	
Heptathlon	5819 pts	Aaron Booth	25–26 January 2019	Razorback Invitational	Fayetteville, United States	
Heptathlon	60m / Long jump / Shot put / High jump / 60m H / Pole vault / 1000m; 7.11 / 7.39 m / 14.28 m / 2.01 m / 8.52 / 4.75 m / 2:44.85					
3000 m walk	11:17.66	Quentin Rew	5 January 2014		Sheffield, United Kingdom	
5000 m walk						
4 × 400 m relay						

=== Women ===
Event	Record	Athlete	Date	Meet	Place	Ref.
50 m	6.4 h	Jan Lothian	2 October 1971		Napier, New Zealand	
55 m	6.70+	Zoe Hobbs	8 February 2025	Millrose Games	New York City, United States	
60 m	7.06	Zoe Hobbs	2 March 2024	World Championships	Glasgow, United Kingdom	
200 m	23.27 A	Annalies Kalma	20 February 2026	Mountain West Championships	Reno, United States	
300 m	37.08 A	Annalies Kalma	16 January 2026	Nevada Invitational & Multi	Reno, United States	
400 m	51.81 A	Annalies Kalma	14 February 2026	Battle Born Classic	Reno, United States	
500 m	1:12.42	Justine Craig	25 January 1986		Fayetteville, United States	
600 m	1:28.21	Boh Ritchie	17 January 2026	Nittany Lion Challenge	University Park, United States	
800 m	2:00.36	Toni Hodgkinson	9 March 1997	World Championships	Paris, France	
1000 m	2:36.96	Toni Hodgkinson	6 February 2000		Roxbury, United States	
1500 m	4:06.51	Maia Ramsden	1 March 2024	World Championships	Glasgow, United Kingdom	
Mile	4:21.56	Maia Ramsden	2 March 2025	BU Last Chance National Qualifier	Boston, United States	
2000 m	5:47.62	Lucy van Dalen	8 February 2014	New Balance Indoor Grand Prix	Roxbury, United States	
3000 m	8:38.14	Kim Smith	27 January 2007		Roxbury, United States	
Two miles	9:13.94	Kim Smith	26 January 2008		Roxbury, United States	
5000 m	14:39.89	Kim Smith	27 February 2009		New York City, United States	
50 m hurdles	7.2 h	Jan Lothian	2 October 1971		Napier, New Zealand	
50 m hurdles	7.2 h	Karen Page	17 February 1979		Logan, United States	
55 m hurdles	7.88	Rowena Welford-Morton	13 February 1999		Lubbock, United States	
60 m hurdles	8.61	Carmel Corbett	25 February 1995		Ann Arbor, United States	
High jump	1.86 m	Tania Dixon	28 February 1991		Seville, Spain	
High jump	1.86 m	Josie Taylor	19 February 2022	Conference USA Championships.	Birmingham, United States	
Pole vault	4.84 m	Eliza McCartney	10 February 2024	Meeting Hauts-de-France Pas-de-Calais	Liévin, France	
Long jump	6.34 m	Chantal Brunner	8 March 1997	World Championships	Paris, France	
Triple jump	12.84 m	Kayla Goodwin	11 March 2023	NCAA Division II Championships	Virginia Beach, United States	
Shot put	20.98 m	Valerie Adams	28 August 2013	Weltklasse Zürich	Zürich, Switzerland	
Weight throw	20.45 m	Julia Ratcliffe	25 February 2017	Ivy League Championships	New York City, United States	
Pentathlon	4148 pts	Carmel Corbett	25 February 1994		West Lafayette, United States	
Pentathlon	60m H / High jump / Shot put / Long jump / 800m; 8.82 / 1.81 m / 12.47 m / 5.61 m / 2:22.86					
Mile walk	7:01.87	Amanda Gorst	18 January 2006		Findlay, United States	
3000 m walk	14:21.21 OT (Note: because mark was set on oversized track IAAF recognises Alana Barbers time of 14:49.34 on 14 February 2016 in Birmingham as record)	Amanda Gorst	9 February 2006		Boone, United States	
4 × 400 m relay						
