= Jake Robertson =

New Zealand long-distance runner

Personal information
- Nationality: New Zealand
- Born: 14 November 1989 (age 37) Hamilton, New Zealand

Sport
- Sport: Track and field
- Events: 5000m, 10000m, Marathon

Jake Robertson (born 14 November 1989) is a New Zealand distance runner. When he was 17 he moved to Iten, Kenya with his twin brother and fellow professional runner Zane Robertson.

He competed in the 5000m at the 2013 World Championships in Moscow, where he finished 14th in the second heat in a time of 14:09.55 and did not qualify for the final. At the 2014 Commonwealth Games in Glasgow he finished ninth in the 5000 metres and seventh in the 10,000 metres.

Robertson was runner up in the 2017 Great North Run in 1:00:12, 6 seconds behind Mo Farah.

In 2018 he took first place at the Houston Half Marathon with a time of 1:00:01. On 4 March 2018 Robertson came third in the Lake Biwa Marathon, in a time of 2:08:26, breaking Rod Dixon's New Zealand record by 33 seconds. Four weeks later, Roberson defended his Crescent City Classic 10 km title in 27:28, equalling his brother Zane's national record.

Robertson placed fifth in the 10,000m at the 2018 Commonwealth Games in the Gold Coast, breaking his brother Zane's national record with a time of 27:30.90.

== Personal Bests ==
Personal Bests
Event	Time	Place	Competition	Venue	Date
1500m	3:47.60	7	AK Kitale	Kitale, Kenya	7 April 2012
Mile	4:01.82	9	Mt Sac Relays	Walnut, CA	20 April 2012
3000m	8:04.57	5	Cork City Games	Cork, Ireland	17 July 2012
5000m	13:15.54	11	KBC Nacht	Heusden, Belgium	13 July 2013
10000m	27:30.90 NR	5	2018 Commonwealth Games	Gold Coast, Australia	13 April 2018
10 km	27:28	1	Crescent City Classic	New Orleans, LA	31 March 2018
Half Marathon	59:57	2	Great North Run	Newcastle, Great Britain	9 September 2018
Marathon	2:08:26 NR	3	Lake Biwa Marathon	Otsu City, Japan	4 March 2018
