= Bob Thomas (long jumper) =

New Zealand long jumper

Robert Edwin Thomas (20 March 1939 – 26 January 2016) was a New Zealand long jumper who still holds the current national long jump record of 8.05m. He won three national titles in the long jump, and one in the high jump.

== Personal bests ==
Event	Distance	Place	Date
Long jump	8.05 m NR	Whangarei	1968
