= Zane Robertson =

New Zealand middle-distance runner (born 1989)

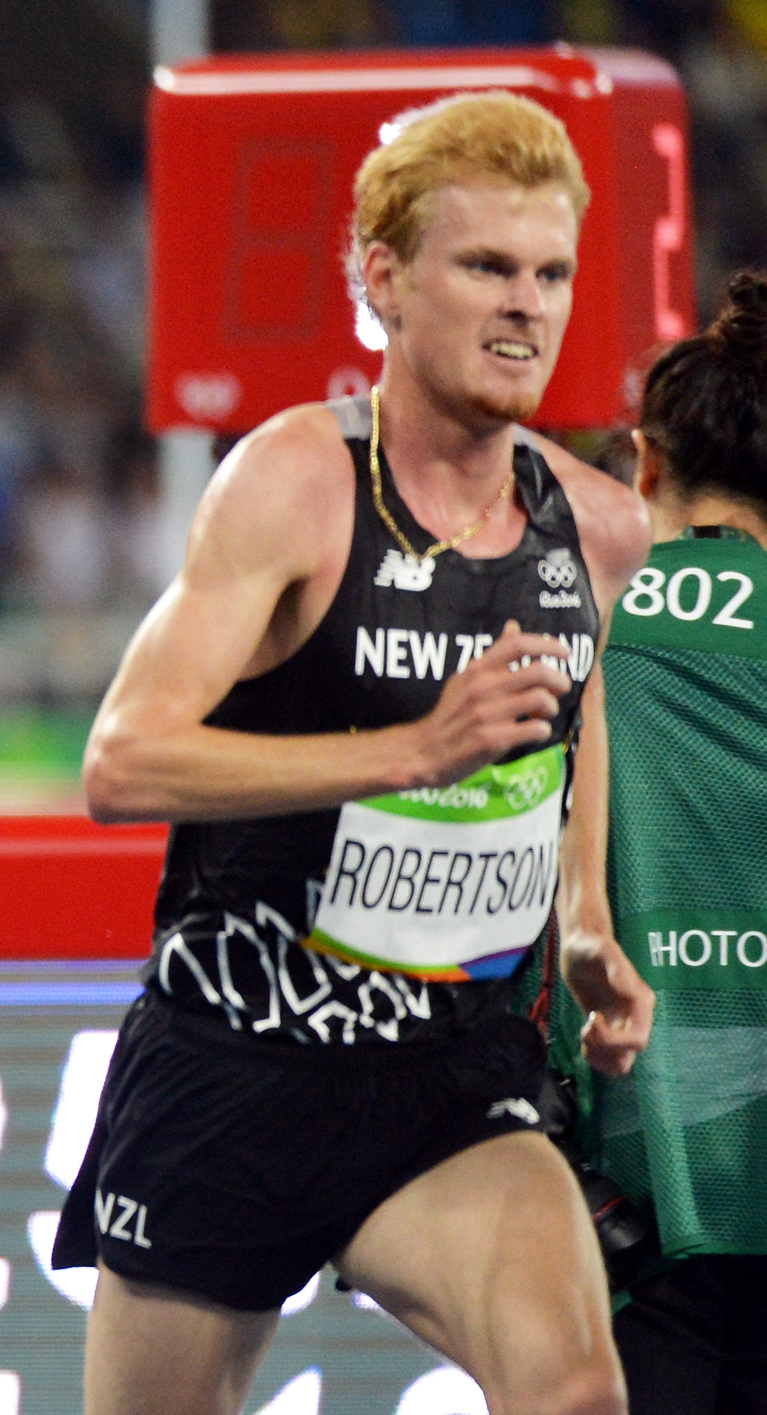
- Robertson at the 2016 Rio Olympics

Personal information
- Born: 14 November 1989 (age 37) Hamilton, New Zealand
- Home town: Iten, Kenya
- Height: 1.82 m (6 ft 0 in)
- Weight: 63 kg (139 lb)

Sport
- Sport: Track and field
- Event: 800 metres – half marathon
Medal record
Representing New Zealand
Commonwealth Games
Bronze medal – third place	2014 Glasgow	5000 m
Continental Cup
Silver medal – second place	2014 Marrakesh	5000 m

Zane Robertson (born 14 November 1989) is a New Zealand middle and long-distance runner. He won the bronze medal in the 5000 metres at the 2014 Commonwealth Games. Robertson is the Oceanian record holder for the 10 kilometres and half marathon, and New Zealand record holder for the marathon. He also holds the area best in the road 10 miles. He is currently serving an eight-year ban for breaching two World Athletics anti-doping rules.

At the age of 17, he and his twin brother Jake moved from New Zealand to Iten, Kenya, to further their running careers.

On 22 March 2023, it was announced that Robertson had been banned from competition for eight years following two World Athletics anti-doping rule violations. He received a four-year ban for the use of EPO found in in-competition test in May 2022 and an additional four years for tampering with the doping control process.

== Career ==
=== 2013–2021 ===
Zane Robertson competed in the 2013 World Championships in Moscow over the 5000 metres, where he finished 14th with a time of 13:46.55.

At the 2014 IAAF World Indoor Championships, Robertson finished 12th in the final of the 3000 metres event in a time of 8:01.81 after running a New Zealand indoor record of 7:44.16 in the heats. He won the bronze medal in the 5000 m at the 2014 Commonwealth Games in Glasgow.

In 2015, Robertson set a new Oceanian record in the half marathon in Marugame with a time of 59:47. He became only the fourth non-African runner in history to run the distance in under one hour.

At the 2016 Rio Olympics, Robertson finished 12th in the men's 10,000 metres with a time of 27:33.67. This result broke Dick Quax's 39-year-old New Zealand national record by more than 8 seconds.

Robertson was selected to represent New Zealand in both the marathon and 10,000 m at the 2018 Commonwealth Games, and planned to contest one of the two events. However, he withdrew from the team on 5 April, after his training was hampered by a groin injury earlier in the year. At the 2019 Gold Coast Marathon, Robertson placed third in a time of 2:08:19, breaking his brother Jake's national record by seven seconds.

In 2021, Robertson finished 36th in the Tokyo Olympic Games marathon with a time of 2:17:04.

=== 2022 New Zealand Sports Tribunal ban ===
On 20 September 2022, Robertson was provisionally suspended without opposition for anti-doping rule violations (ADRVs), including the use of EPO found in in-competition test in May 2022. Then his B sample confirmed the original result. On 22 March 2023, it was announced that he had been banned from competition for eight years for two World Athletics anti-doping rule violations. He received a four-year ban for the use of EPO and an additional four years for providing falsified records and false testimony, effectively ending his athletics career. Robertson had supplied falsified documents suggesting a medical clinic had administered EPO instead of the COVID-19 vaccination he was seeking.

== Personal bests ==
Surface	Distance	Time (h:)m:s	Place	Date	Notes
Track	1500 metres	3:34.19	Rieti, Italy	7 September 2014	
Track	3000 metres	7:41.37	Cork, Ireland	8 July 2014	
Track	3000 metres indoor	7:44.16	Sopot, Poland	7 March 2014	
Track	5000 metres	13:13.83	Heusden-Zolder, Belgium	13 July 2013	
Track	10,000 metres	27:33.67	Rio de Janeiro, Brazil	13 August 2016	
Road	10 kilometres	27:28	Berlin, Germany	9 October 2016	Oceanian record
Road	10 miles	46:29	Amsterdam, Netherlands	23 September 2018	Oceanian best
Road	Half marathon	59:47	Marugame, Japan	1 February 2015	Oceanian record
Road	Marathon	2:08:19	Gold Coast, Australia	6 July 2019	New Zealand

== Personal life ==
Robertson has stated depression, divorce, and pressure from sponsors contributed to his use of EPO, which he claims he had just started using at the time of his ban.

In September 2023 Kenyan newspaper The Standard reported that Robertson had been arrested after an AK-47 and 23 rounds of ammunition were found in his house. Police visited the address after a woman made an allegation of rape about Robertson. The allegation was later dropped and Robertson was acquitted of gun charges in February 2025. Robertson claims he was framed and robbed by the Kenyan police.
