= Lex Revell-Lewis =

New Zealand athlete (born 2004)

Personal information
- Born: 25 February 2004 (age 22)

Sport
- Country: New Zealand
- Sport: Athletics
- Event: 400 metres

Achievements and titles
- National finals: 400 m champion (2023, 2024, 2025, 2026)
- Personal best(s): 200m: 20.49 (Christchurch, 2026); 400m: 45.82 (Darwin, 2026) NR
Medal record
Men's athletics
Representing New Zealand
Oceania Championships
Gold medal – first place	2024 Suva	Mixed 4 × 400 m relay

Lex Revell-Lewis (born 25 February 2004) is a New Zealand sprinter. He is the national record holder over 400 metres and a multiple-time national champion.

== Biography ==
From Avondale, Auckland, he trains in Henderson. He joined Avondale Athletics Club at the age of two years-old before later joining Waitakere Athletics Club, working with coach Nuree Greenhalgh. He won the New Zealand Junior Boys 400 metres title at the New Zealand Secondary Schools Track & Field Championships in 2019. That year, he also won the national U18 400 m title in Christchurch. He later attended Avondale College and won the Auckland 400 m title in 2021, amidst race cancelations at the time due to the Covid-19 pandemic.

In 2022, he ran personal bests to win the Auckland Championships in 48.75 seconds, and the Sir Graeme Douglas International in Auckland in 47.49 seconds. He then won the national U20 400m title and represented New Zealand at the 2022 World Athletics U20 Championships in Cali, Colombia, although hampered by injury at the Championships. In the 2023 season, he won his first national senior 400m title at the New Zealand Athletics Championships in Wellington running 47.68 seconds, and also ran a personal best of 47.36 seconds whilst competing in Australia. The following year, he retained his national 400 metres title with a run of 46.56 seconds at the New Zealand Athletics Championships in Wellington. That year, he ran a new 400 m personal best at the Sir Graeme Douglas International event, of 46.12 seconds. In June 2024, he was part of the New Zealand mixed 4 x 400 metres team which won the gold medal at the 2024 Oceania Athletics Championships in Suva, Fiji in 3:26.12.

In March 2025, he won the New Zealand Athletics Championships in Dunedin, with a winning time of 46.16 seconds. That month in Melbourne, Revell-Lewis became the first New Zealand athlete man to break 46 seconds for 400 metres, when he ran 45.88 seconds to break the previous national record held by Shaun Farrell since 1998.

In March 2026, he lowered his national record to 45.87 seconds in finishing runner-up to Luke van Ratingen at the Adelaide Invitational. In March 2026, he also retained his national 400 m title at the New Zealand Athletics Championships with a time of 45.97 seconds. He was subsequently named in the New Zealand team for the 2026 World Athletics Indoor Championships in Toruń, Poland, where he ran a New Zealand indoor national record of 47.17 metres. He was selected for the 2026 World Athletics Relays in Gaborone, Botswana. In May, Revell-Lewis finished fourth in the men's 400m at the 2026 Oceania Athletics Championships in Darwin, running 45.82 seconds, a New Zealand national record.

== Personal life ==
He is of Samoan descent through his mother.
