= Alessandra Bonora =

Italian sprinter

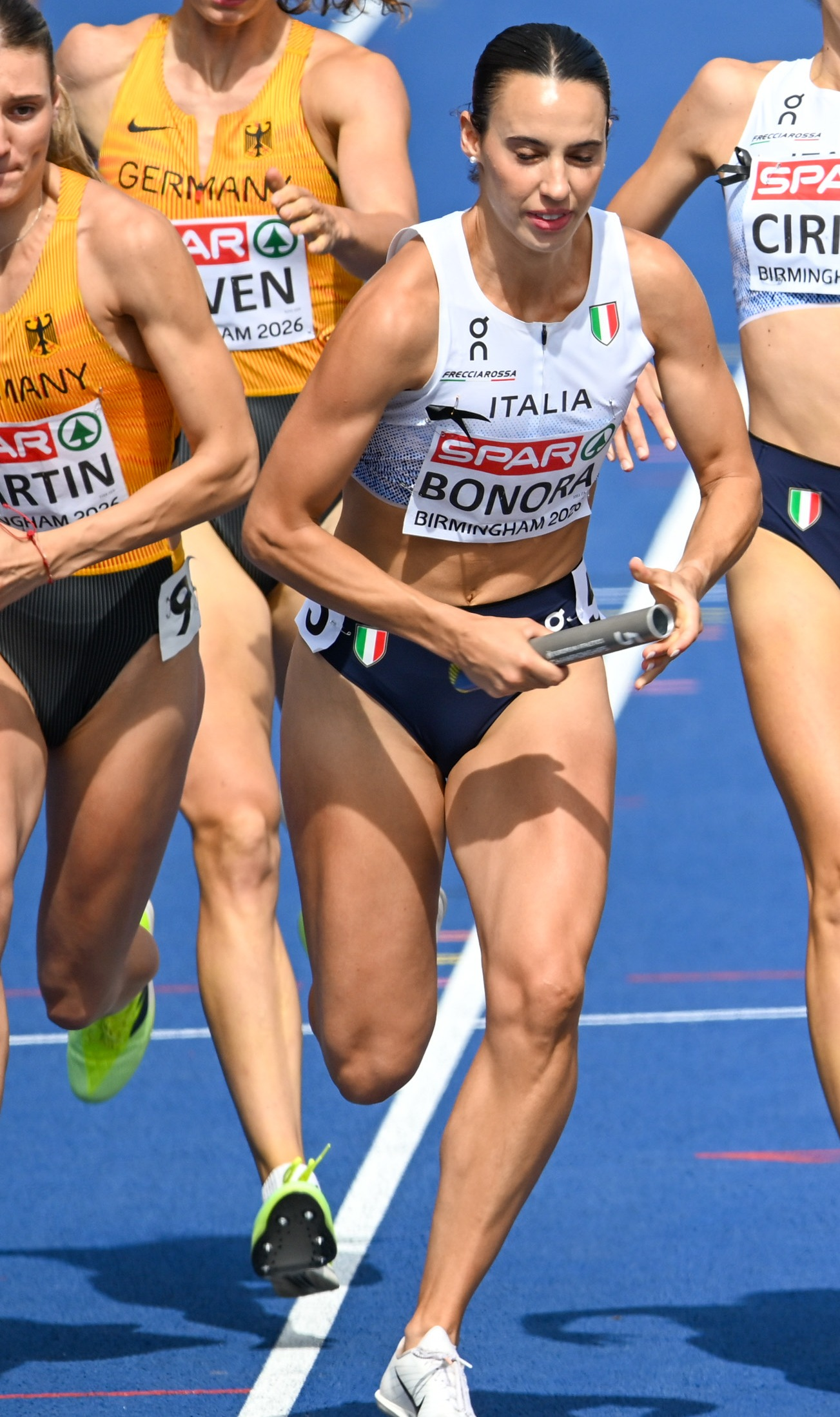
- Competing at the 2026 European Championships

Personal information
- National team: Italian Team
- Born: 7 September 2000 (age 25) Brescia, Italy
- Height: 1.71 m (5 ft 7 in)
- Weight: 59 kg (130 lb)

Sport
- Sport: Athletics
- Event: 400 m
- Club: G.S. Fiamme Gialle
- Coached by: Maurizio Affò

Achievements and titles
- Personal best: 400 m: 51.27 (2026)
Medal record
Women's athletics
Representing Italy
European Championships
Bronze medal – third place	2026 Birmingham	4 × 400 m relay
World University Games
Bronze medal – third place	2025 Bochum	400 m
Mediterranean Games
Silver medal – second place	2026 Taranto	400 m
Mediterranean U23 Championships
Gold medal – first place	2022 Pescara	400 m
Gold medal – first place	2022 Pescara	4 × 400 m

Alessandra Bonora (born 7 September 2000) is an Italian sprinter current national record holder of the 4 × 400 m relay.

== Career ==
In 2022 Bonora won two gold medals at the Mediterranean Athletics U23 Championships.

== National records ==
- 4 × 400 metres relay: 3:23.86 (Budapest, Hungary, 26 August 2023) - current holder with Alice Mangione, Ayomide Folorunso, Giancarla Trevisan

== Achievements ==
Year	Competition	Venue	Rank	Event	Time	Notes
2023	World Championships	(Hungary) Budapest	7th	4 × 400 m relay	3:24.98	(Note: NR 3:23.86 in heat)
2025	World Relays	(China) Guangzhou	5th	4 × 400 m relay	3:26.40	

== National titles ==
- Italian Athletics Championships
  - 400 metres: 2023

== See also ==
- List of Italian records in athletics
