= Veronika Drljačić =

Croatian sprinter (born 2001)

Personal information
- Born: 13 December 2001 (age 24)

Sport
- Sport: Athletics
- Event: 400 metres

Achievements and titles
- Personal bests: 200m: 23.23 (Karlovac, 2025); 400m: 51.22 (Volos, 2025); Indoor; 200m: 23.76 (Mesto, 2026) NR; 400m: 52.71 (Karlsruhe, 2026)
Medal record
Women's athletics
Representing Croatia
World University Games
Silver medal – second place	2025 Bochum	400 m

Veronika Drljačić (born 13 December 2001) is a Croatian sprinter. She won the silver medal over 400 metres at the 2025 Summer World University Games and is the Croatian indoor national record holder over 200 metres. She competed at the 2025 World Athletics Championships.

== Biography ==
Drljačić was a member of the Croatian 4 x 400 metres team which set a national record at the 2023 European Athletics Team Championships Second Division in Silesia in June 2023.

Competing in the 400m indoors, she set a new indoor personal with a time of 53.42 seconds in Hungary in February 2025. She competed for Croatia at the 2025 European Athletics Indoor Championships in Apeldoorn, Netherlands the following month, without advancing to the semi-finals.

Drljačić was a member of the Croatian 4 x 100 metres relay which set a national record at the 2025 European Athletics Team Championships Second Division in Maribor in June 2025. She won a silver medal over 400 metres at the 2025 Summer World University Games in Bochum, Germany, running a personal best 51.66 seconds in the final. Competing at the 2025 Balkan Athletics Championships she set a personal best of 51.22 seconds for the 400 metres, winning the gold medal in Volos, Greece. In August, she won the 400 metres and 200 metres tiles at the Croatian Athletics Championships, running a championship record 52.62 in the 400 metres, and setting a personal best 23.23 in the 200 metres.

Drljačić competed at the women's 400 metres at the 2025 World Athletics Championships in Tokyo, Japan in September 2025, without advancing to the semi-finals.

Competing indoors in January 2026, she ran a personal best in the 400 meters, with a time of 52.81 in Zagreb. Shortly afterwards in Novo Mesto, she ran a new indoors national record in the 200 meters. Later that month in Belgrade, she was part of the Croatian 4 × 400 m relay team that set a new national indoor record of 3:39.71. She won the 400 metres at the 2026 Croatian Indoor Championships in Zagreb, running 53.28 seconds. The following day, she ran 23.77 seconds to also win the 200 metres. She competed at the 2026 World Athletics Indoor Championships in Toruń, Poland. Competing at the 2026 European Athletics Championships in Birmingham, England, in August, she was a semi-finalist in the 400 metres.

== Personal life ==
From Križevci, she studied at the University of Zagreb.
