= Annalies Kalma =

New Zealand sprinter (born 2003)

Personal information
- Born: 6 December 2003 (age 22)

Sport
- Country: New Zealand
- Sport: Athletics
- Event: Sprint

Achievements and titles
- Personal best(s): Indoors: 200m: 23.27 (Reno, 2026) NR; 400m: 51.81 (Reno, 2026) NR; Outdoors: 200m: 23.73(+1.5 m/s) (Fresno, 2025); 400m: 52.71 (Baton Rouge, 2025)

Annalies Kalma (born 6 December 2003) is a New Zealand sprinter. She is the New Zealand indoor national record holder over 200 metres and 400 metres, achieving both times competing in the United States for the University of Nevada.

== Biography ==
From Hamilton, New Zealand, she attended St Peter's School, Cambridge. In 2019, she broke the North Island Secondary School athletics record for the under-16 400 metres, running 54.69 seconds.

Kalma competes as a sprinter for the University of Nevada in the United States. Kalma competed as part of Nevada's 4 x 400m relay team at the 2023 NCAA Division I Outdoor Track and Field Championships during her freshman season, earning All-American honours.

In February 2026, Kalma set a New Zealand indoor national record of 52.31 for the 400 metres in Reno, Nevada. The following week, on 14 February at the Battle Born Classic in Reno, Kalma ran a new 400 m indoor national record again with 51.81 seconds. At the 2026 Mountain West indoor championships, Kalma won the 200 metres in a school record of 23.27 seconds, and finished runner-up in the 400 metres, as well as running as part of Nevada's 4x400 relay team which also placed second helping Nevada place second overall in the team competition. Her 200 m time of 23.27 seconds broke her own New Zealand indoor record of 23.35 seconds set in Reno three weeks prior.

In March 2026, Kalma ran 53.03 seconds in the heats of the 400 m at the 2026 World Athletics Indoor Championships in Toruń, Poland.
