= Haiti at the World Athletics Championships =

- Flag of Haiti
- WA code: HAI
- Medals: Gold 0 Silver 0 Bronze 1 Total 1

World Athletics Championships appearances (overview)
- 1987; 1991; 1993; 1995; 1997; 1999; 2001; 2003; 2005; 2007; 2009; 2011; 2013; 2015; 2017; 2019; 2022; 2023; 2025

Haiti has competed in every World Athletics Championships editions since 1987, only missing the first one in 1983. Since then, it has only been on the podium one time, by former American hurdler Dudley Dorival in 2001, who placed third in the men's 110 metres hurdles.

== Medalists ==
Medal	Name	Year	Event
Bronze	Dudley Dorival	2001 Edmonton	Men's 110 meters hurdles

=== By event ===
Event	Gold	Silver	Bronze	Total
110 meters hurdles	0	0	1	1
Totals (1 entries)	0	0	1	1

=== By gender ===
Gender	Gold	Silver	Bronze	Total
Men	0	0	1	1
Women	0	0	0	0

== See also ==
- Haiti at the Olympics
- Haiti at the Paralympics
