= National records in the 200 metres =

The following table is an overview of national records in the 200 metres.

== Outdoor ==
=== Men ===
Country	Time	Athlete	Date	Place	Ref.	Video
Jamaica	19.19 (−0.3 m/s)	Usain Bolt	20 August 2009	Berlin		
United States	19.31 (+0.4 m/s)	Noah Lyles	20 July 2022	Eugene		
Botswana	19.46 (+0.4 m/s)	Letsile Tebogo	7 August 2024	Saint-Denis		
Canada	19.62 (−0.5 m/s)	Andre De Grasse	3 August 2021	Tokyo		
Cuba	19.63 (+1.2 m/s)	Reynier Mena	2 July 2022	La Chaux-de-Fonds		
Cayman Islands	19.63 (+1.5 m/s)	Jaiden Reid	12 June 2026	Eugene		
Antigua and Barbuda	19.67 (+0.4 m/s) #	Miguel Francis	10 July 2016	St. John's		
Australia	19.67 (+1.7 m/s)	Gout Gout	12 April 2026	Sydney		
Namibia	19.68 (+0.4 m/s)	Frankie Fredericks	1 August 1996	Atlanta		
South Africa	19.69 (−0.5 m/s) A	Clarence Munyai	16 March 2018	Pretoria		
Italy	19.72 (+1.8 m/s) A	Pietro Mennea	12 September 1979	Mexico City		
Nigeria	19.73 (+0.8 m/s)	Divine Oduduru	7 June 2019	Austin		
Great Britain	19.73 (+1.6 m/s)	Zharnel Hughes	23 July 2023	London		
Bahamas	19.75 (+0.3 m/s)	Steven Gardiner	7 April 2018	Coral Gables		
Uganda	19.75 (+1.0 m/s)	Tarsis Orogot	10 May 2024	Gainesville		
Turkey	19.76 (+0.7 m/s)	Ramil Guliyev	9 August 2018	Berlin		
Antigua and Barbuda	19.76 (−1.1 m/s) #	Miguel Francis	28 June 2015	St. John's		
Puerto Rico	19.76 (+2.0 m/s)	José Figueroa	5 August 2026	Santo Domingo		
Trinidad and Tobago	19.77 (+0.7 m/s)	Ato Boldon	13 July 1997	Stuttgart		
Ghana	19.79 (+1.3 m/s)	James Dadzie	28 April 2023	Lubbock		
France	19.80 (+0.8 m/s)	Christophe Lemaitre	3 September 2011	Daegu		
Netherlands	19.81 (+0.4 m/s)	Churandy Martina	25 August 2016	Lausanne		
Panama	19.81 (−0.3 m/s)	Alonso Edward	20 August 2009	Berlin		
Liberia	19.83 (+0.6 m/s)	Joseph Fahnbulleh	9 June 2022	Eugene		
Zimbabwe	19.84 (+0.3 m/s)	Tapiwanashe Makarawu	13 June 2025	Eugene		
Greece	19.85 (−0.5 m/s)	Konstantinos Kenteris	9 August 2002	Munich		
Dominican Republic	19.86 (+0.6 m/s)	Alexander Ogando	24 August 2024	Chorzów		
Dominican Republic	19.86 (+1.7 m/s)	Alexander Ogando	2 May 2025	Miramar		
Ecuador	19.87 (−0.1 m/s)	Álex Quiñónez	5 July 2019	Lausanne		
China	19.88 (+0.9 m/s)	Xie Zhenye	21 July 2019	London		
Antigua and Barbuda	19.88 (+1.2 m/s)	Miguel Francis	11 June 2016	Kingston		
Thailand	19.88 (−0.3 m/s)	Puripol Boonson	27 September 2026	Nagoya		
Norway	19.89 (+1.3 m/s)	Jaysuma Saidy Ndure	23 September 2007	Stuttgart		
Brazil	19.89 (−0.8 m/s)	Claudinei da Silva	11 September 1999	Munich		
Mauritius	19.89 (+1.3 m/s)	Noa Bibi	10 July 2022	Albi		
Morocco	19.92 (+0.4 m/s)	Yassine Hssine	14 July 2026	Budapest		
Ecuador	19.93 (−0.5 m/s) A	Álex Quiñónez	7 June 2018	Cochabamba		
Ivory Coast	19.93 (−0.1 m/s)	Cheickna Traore	23 May 2024	Lexington		
England	19.94 (+0.3 m/s)	John Regis	20 August 1993	Stuttgart		
Israel	19.96 (−1.0 m/s) A	Blessing Afrifah	4 August 2022	Cali		
Qatar	19.97 (−0.4 m/s)	Femi Ogunode	11 September 2015	Brussels		
Barbados	19.97 (−0.9 m/s)	Obadele Thompson	9 September 2000	Yokohama		
Suriname	19.97 (+1.3 m/s)	Issamade Asinga	29 April 2023	Lubbock		
Switzerland	19.98 (+1.5 m/s)	Alex Wilson	30 June 2019	La Chaux-de-Fonds		
Poland	19.98 (+1.7 m/s)	Marcin Urbaś	25 August 1999	Seville		
Colombia	20.00 (+0.3 m/s)	Bernardo Baloyes	31 July 2018	Barranquilla		
Ukraine	20.00 (±0.0 m/s)	Valeriy Borzov	4 September 1972	Munich		
Portugal	20.01 (+1.6 m/s)	Francis Obikwelu	10 August 2006	Gothenburg		
Germany	20.02 (+0.6 m/s)	Joshua Hartmann	9 July 2023	Kassel		
Japan	20.03 (+0.6 m/s)	Shingo Suetsugu	7 June 2003	Yokohama		
Azerbaijan	20.04 (+0.1 m/s)	Ramil Guliyev	10 July 2009	Belgrade		
Spain	20.04 (+0.8 m/s)	Bruno Hortelano	22 July 2018	Getafe		
Netherlands Antilles	20.08 (+0.4 m/s)	Churandy Martina	8 July 2010	Lausanne		
Saint Kitts and Nevis	20.08 (+1.6 m/s)	Antoine Adams	22 June 2014	Basseterre		
Swaziland	20.09 (+1.5 m/s) A #	Sibusiso Matsenjwa	27 January 2018	Pretoria		
Hungary	20.11 (+0.7 m/s)	Attila Kovács	21 August 1987	Miskolc		
Colombia	20.11 (+0.5 m/s) A	Bernardo Baloyes	11 June 2017	Medellín		
Belgium	20.13 (+0.4 m/s)	Simon Verherstraeten	14 July 2024	La Chaux-de-Fonds		
Guyana	20.14 (+1.8 m/s)	James Gilkes	12 September 1978	Ingelheim am Rhein		
Ecuador	20.14 (−0.2 m/s)	Álex Quiñónez	28 April 2018	Clermont		
Kenya	20.14 (+1.9 m/s)	Carvin Nkanata	18 April 2015	Clermont		
Saudi Arabia	20.14 (+1.8 m/s)	Abdulaziz Abdui Atafi	17 May 2025	Taif		
Chile	20.15 (+0.4 m/s)	Sebastián Keitel	17 May 1998	Santiago		
Anguilla	20.15 (±0.0 m/s)	Zharnel Hughes	16 May 2015	George Town		
Bahamas	20.16 (+0.8 m/s)	Michael Mathieu	6 May 2012	Belém		
Sudan	20.16 (+2.0 m/s)	Ahmed Ali	1 April 2016	Gainesville		
Zambia	20.16 (+1.5 m/s)	Sydney Siame	29 June 2019	La Chaux-de-Fonds		
Mexico	20.17 (+0.9 m/s)	José Carlos Herrera	16 April 2016	Norwalk		
Bahrain	20.19 (+0.3 m/s)	Mohamed Salem Eid Yaqoob	16 August 2016	Rio de Janeiro		
Costa Rica	20.20 (+0.2 m/s)	Nery Brenes	16 August 2016	Rio de Janeiro		
Bulgaria	20.20 (+0.8 m/s)	Nikolay Antonov	26 August 1991	Tokyo		
Scotland	20.21	Allan Wells	28 July 1980	Moscow		
Senegal	20.21 (+0.6 m/s) A	Oumar Loum	1 July 2000	Mexico City		
Swaziland	20.22 (+0.2 m/s)	Sibusiso Matsenjwa	3 August 2021	Tokyo		
Chinese Taipei	20.23 (+0.7 m/s)	Yang Chun-han	29 August 2018	Jakarta		
Russia	20.23 (−0.4 m/s)	Vladimir Krylov	3 September 1987	Rome		
Cameroon	20.23 (+0.8 m/s)	Emmanuel Eseme	7 July 2025	Sotteville-lès-Rouen		
Slovakia	20.24 (+1.6 m/s)	Ján Volko	8 July 2018	Trnava		
Turks and Caicos Islands	20.27 (+0.9 m/s)	Delano Williams	14 March 2013	Kingston		
Ecuador	20.27 (+1.3 m/s)	Álex Quiñónez	22 November 2017	Santa Marta		
Grenada	20.27 (+1.8 m/s)	Nazzio John	12 July 2025	Memphis		
Ireland	20.27 (+2.0 m/s)	Sean Aigboboh	30 April 2026	Houston		
Montserrat	20.28 (+0.7 m/s) A	Julius Morris	14 May 2017	El Paso		
Bermuda	20.30 (+1.2 m/s)	Troy Douglas	22 August 1997	Brussels		
British Virgin Islands	20.30 (+1.5 m/s)	Dion Crabbe	12 May 2002	Starkville		
Sweden	20.30 (+1.3 m/s)	Johan Wissman	23 September 2007	Stuttgart		
Dominica	20.31 (+1.6 m/s)	Chris Lloyd	3 May 2008	Houston		
Samoa	20.31 (−0.4 m/s)	Jeremy Dodson	25 August 2015	Beijing		
India	20.32 (+0.8 m/s)	Animesh Kujur	31 May 2025	Gumi		
Kazakhstan	20.34 (−1.2 m/s)	Vladimir Muravyov	18 August 1984	Moscow		
New Zealand	20.35 (+1.2 m/s)	Tommy Te Puni	21 February 2026	Christchurch		
Lesotho	20.36 (+0.5 m/s)	Mosito Lehata	31 July 2014	Glasgow		
Egypt	20.36 (+1.3 m/s)	Amr Ibrahim Mostafa Seoud	1 August 2010	Nairobi		
Argentina	20.37 (+0.7 m/s)	Carlos Gats	18 July 1998	Lisbon		
Cyprus	20.37 (+1.9 m/s)	Prodromos Katsantonis	19 July 1998	Athens		
Sri Lanka	20.37 (+0.1 m/s)	Yupun Abeykoon	22 May 2022	Grosseto		
Gabon	20.37 (+1.2 m/s)	Guy Maganga Gorra	13 July 2025	Thonon-les-Bains		
Finland	20.38 (+0.5 m/s)	Riku Illukka	13 August 2026	Birmingham		
Czech Republic	20.39 (+0.2 m/s)	Ondřej Macík	30 July 2023	Tábor		
DR Congo	20.40 (+0.2 m/s)	Gary Kikaya	12 June 2006	Karlskrona		
South Korea	20.40 (+0.3 m/s)	Park Tae-geon	27 June 2018	Jeongseon-eup		
Honduras	20.40 (−0.9 m/s)	Rolando Palacios	20 July 2008	Toluca		
South Korea	20.41	Jang Jae-keun	27 September 1985	Jakarta		
Kuwait	20.41 (+0.2 m/s)	Fawzi Al-Shammari	9 September 2003	Amman		
Latvia	20.41 (+1.3 m/s)	Sergejs Inšakovs	31 July 1996	Atlanta		
Saint Lucia	20.41 (+0.8 m/s)	Michael Joseph	12 May 2023	Norman		
Paraguay	20.41 (+0.7 m/s)	Cesar Almiron	8 June 2024	Cochabamba, Bolivia		
Estonia	20.43 (+1.1 m/s)	Marek Niit	9 June 2011	Des Moines		
Austria	20.45 (+0.8 m/s)	Christoph Pöstinger	8 June 1996	Ebensee		
Gambia	20.45 (+1.8 m/s)	Adama Jammeh	26 June 2016	Durban		
Uruguay	20.46 (+1.2 m/s)	Heber Viera	12 May 2002	Guatemala City		
Slovenia	20.47 (+0.5 m/s)	Matic Osovnikar	24 August 2004	Athens		
Lithuania	20.48 (+1.9 m/s)	Gediminas Truskauskas	8 June 2021	Eisenstadt		
Denmark	20.49 (−0.2 m/s)	Simon Hansen	5 September 2021	Aarhus		
Bosnia and Herzegovina	20.5 h (+1.2 m/s)	Mladen Nikolić	3 June 1984	Belgrade		
Mali	20.52 (+1.8 m/s)	Fode Sissoko	13 July 2018	Kortrijk		
Comoros	20.52 (+0.8 m/s)	Hachim Maaroufou	26 May 2022	Aubagne		
Comoros	20.52 (+1.1 m/s)	Hachim Maaroufou	11 June 2023	Montpellier		
Algeria	20.53 (+1.9 m/s)	Soufiane Bouhadda	16 July 2016	Algiers		
Fiji	20.53 (−1.5 m/s)	Banuve Tabakaucoro	16 July 2015	Port Moresby		
Guinea	20.54 (−2.2 m/s)	Joseph Loua	5 September 1997	Antananarivo		
Croatia	20.57 (+1.1 m/s)	Karlo Marciuš	23 August 2025	Bratislava		
Venezuela	20.58 (+1.6 m/s)	José Acevedo	31 May 2008	Fayetteville		
Venezuela	20.58 (+1.9 m/s)	José Acevedo	30 May 2008	Fayetteville		
Peru	20.58 (+1.7 m/s) A	Andy Martínez	24 April 2016	Tarija		
Georgia	20.59 (−1.1 m/s)	Besik Gotsiridze	15 August 1987	Moscow		
Aruba	20.59	Miguel Janssen	17 July 1994	Assen		
Lebanon	20.59 (−0.7 m/s)	Noureddine Hadid	1 June 2024	Marsa		
Madagascar	20.6 h (NWI)	Jean-Louis Ravelomanantsoa	20 May 1972	San Diego		
South Sudan	20.61 A (−0.5 m/s)	Malek Thiep Deng	9 April 2026	Lang'ata		
Oman	20.62 (−0.1 m/s)	Mohammed Obaid Al-Saadi	23 June 2023	Marrakesh		
United Arab Emirates	20.63 (+1.0 m/s)	Omar Jouma Al-Salfa	24 November 2010	Guangzhou		
Belarus	20.63 (+1.7 m/s)	Aliaksandr Starovoitov	11 June 1988	Leningrad		
Bolivia	20.63 (+1.7 m/s) A	Bruno Rojas	24 April 2016	Tarija		
Iran	20.63 (+1.0 m/s) a	Mohammad Hossein Abareghi	14 June 2014	Taipei		
Papua New Guinea	20.64 (+1.4 m/s)	Tovetuna Tuna (Note: Tovetina Tuna by World Athletics source)	1 May 2025	Lubbock		
Pakistan	20.65 #	Liaquat Ali	1 April 2015	Islamabad		
U.S. Virgin Islands	20.66 (+0.6 m/s)	Calvin Dascent	May 7, 2011	Greensboro		
Hong Kong	20.66 (+1.7 m/s)	Yip King Wai	9 May 2026	Wan Chai		
Haiti	20.69 (−0.9 m/s)	Roudy Monrose	6 August 2011	Uniondale		
Chad	20.69	Abdouraim Haroun	5 May 2012	Ouagadougou		
Burkina Faso	20.69 (+1.5 m/s)	Innocent Bologo	25 May 2013	Dakar		
Malaysia	20.7 h	Ramli Ahmad	29 May 1976	Medan		
Pakistan	20.7 h #	Liaquat Ali	5 April 2015	Islamabad		
Romania	20.70 (+1.0 m/s)	Florin Suciu	24 July 2005	Novi Sad		
Belize	20.70 (+1.8 m/s) #	Jayson Jones	13 June 2008	Miami		
Ethiopia	20.70 A #	Negussie Gechamo	17 May 1998	Addis Ababa		
Serbia	20.70 (+0.7 m/s)	Boško Kijanović	26 June 2022	Kruševac		
Singapore	20.72 (+0.2 m/s)	Marc Brian Louis	13 December 2025	Bangkok		
Ethiopia	20.73 A (−1.5 m/s)	Merdekiyos Wolde	28 March 2026	Addis Ababa		
Malaysia	20.73 (+0.2 m/s)	Danish Iftikhar Muhammad Roslee	13 December 2025	Bangkok		
Uzbekistan	20.74 #	Oleg Juravlyev	1 June 2008	Bishkek		
Congo	20.74 (+1.0 m/s)	Roger Anguono-Moké	29 May 2003	Sint-Niklaas		
Bosnia and Herzegovina	20.74 (+1.2 m/s) #	Mladen Nikolić	9 September 1984	Athens		
Vietnam	20.74 (±0.0 m/s)	Ngần Ngọc Nghĩa	14 May 2022	Hanoi		
Central African Republic	20.75 #	Béranger Aymard Bosse	24 April 2007	Ouagadougou		
Maldives	20.75 (+1.0 m/s)	Hassan Saaid	11 July 2016	Bangalore		
Sierra Leone	20.75 (+1.4 m/s)	Josephus Thomas	16 August 1997	London		
Saint Vincent and the Grenadines	20.76 (+1.0 m/s)	Eswort Coombs	19 May 1995	Odesa		
Indonesia	20.76 (+0.8 m/s)	Suryo Agung Wibowo	11 December 2007	Nakhon Ratchasima		
Luxembourg	20.77	Roland Bombardella	22 August 1977	Stuttgart		
Tajikistan	20.77 (+0.1 m/s)	Ildar Akhmadiev	27 June 2024	Tashkent		
Tanzania	20.8 h	Makame Ally	29 November 2004	Zanzibar		
Jordan	20.81 (+2.0 m/s)	Khalil Al-Hanahneh	24 November 2007	Cairo		
Iraq	20.81 (NWI)	Taha Hussein Yaseen	6 November 2020	Baghdad		
Curaçao	20.82	Liemarvin Bonevacia	29 April 2012	Medellín		
Philippines	20.84 (+0.1 m/s)	Trenten Beram	23 August 2017	Bukit Jalil		
Madagascar	20.85	Hubert Rakotombélontsoa	28 September 1996	Antananarivo		
Togo	20.87 (+1.7 m/s)	Casimir Kossi Akoto	23 June 1996	Bondoufle		
Pakistan	20.87 (+1.7 m/s)	Shajar Abbas	26 June 2022	Almaty		
Libya	20.91 (+0.6 m/s)	Mohamed Khouaja	8 December 2009	Damascus		
Iceland	20.91 (+0.8 m/s)	Kolbeinn Höður Gunnarsson	28 May 2023	Copenhagen		
Benin	20.95	Souhalia Alamou	16 May 2004	Cotonou		
Angola	20.96 (−1.1 m/s)	Marcos Santos	20 March 2024	Accra		
Albania	20.97 (+0.3 m/s)	Franko Burraj	25 June 2025	Maribor		
Tanzania	21.0 h	David Lukuba	22 September 1979	Songea		
Tanzania	21.0 h	Jumane Chobanga	30 October 1979	Songea		
Tanzania	21.0 h	Mwalimu Ally	30 October 1979	Songea		
Tanzania	21.0 h	Peter Mwita	15 March 1980	Arusha		
Tanzania	21.0 h	Thomas Lubuva	26 August 1983	Arusha		
Guinea-Bissau	21.01 (+1.4 m/s)	Holder da Silva	8 July 2009	Salamanca		
Central African Republic	21.01 (+0.4 m/s)	Béranger Aymard Bosse	21 June 2014	Amiens		
San Marino	21.02	Aldo Canti	10 July 1991	Athens		
Uzbekistan	21.04	Oleg Juravlyev	25 May 2007	Tashkent		
El Salvador	21.05	Rubén Benitez	16 May 1998	Los Angeles		
Liechtenstein	21.14	Martin Frick	1 June 1998	Zofingen		
Turkmenistan	21.21	Sergey Vladimirtsev	4 June 1978	Sofia		
Turkmenistan	21.21	Sergey Vladimirtsev	2 August 1978	Havana		
North Korea	21.23	Yu Jong-Rim	17 October 1991	Pyongyang		
Niger	21.24	Yacouba Bello	29 May 2005	Niamey		
Kyrgyzstan	21.25	Valeriy Shchekotov	26 May 1991	Alma		
Equatorial Guinea	21.33	Gustavo Envela	18 May 1985	Eugene		
São Tomé and Príncipe	21.42	Odair Péricles Da Costa	18 June 1997	Barcelona		
Eritrea	21.34 (+0.3 m/s)	Aron Beyene	15 September 2006	Geneva		
Syria	21.45	Nabil Nahri	24 October 1979	Baghdad		
Marshall Islands	21.47	Roman William Cress	13 May 2000	Saint Paul		
Myanmar	21.52	Soe Win	8 December 1969	Rangoon		
French Polynesia	21.60	Robert Tupuhoé	28 August 1989	Nuku'alofa		
Mozambique	21.66	Xato José Muinde	30 May 2009	Gaborone		
New Caledonia	21.7	Joseph Wéjièmé	6 August 1975	Tumon		
Tonga	21.71	Peni'akau Loloa	14 February 1987	Sydney		
Laos	21.83 (+0.3 m/s)	Sorsy Phompakdy	3 July 2024	Surabaya		
Malawi	21.87	Eston Kaonga	27 January 1974	Christchurch		
Nepal	21.87 (+1.9 m/s)	Aayush Kunwar	11 July 2026	Norwalk		
Burundi	21.88	Kassiem Ntahimpéra	16 July 1989	Casablanca		
Somalia	21.88	Ali Abdi Mohamed	21 December 1983	Riyadh		
Malta	21.03 (−0.4 m/s)	Kevin Moore	14 August 2014	Zurich		
Bosnia and Herzegovina	21.05 (+0.9 m/s)	Nedim Čović	6 June 2010	Sarajevo		
Guatemala	21.09 (−1.5 m/s)	Oscar Meneses	23 May 1998	Edwardsville		
French Polynesia	21.1 h	Jean Bourne	28 July 1968	Colombes		
Tunisia	21.11 #	Sofiane Labidi	3 August 1999	Jablonec nad Nisou		
Tunisia	21.14 (+1.6 m/s)	Ridha Ghali	9 July 2005	Radès		
Belize	21.14 (+1.6 m/s)	Jayson Jones	24 May 2008	Clermont		
Moldova	21.15 (NWI)	Yuriy Yordanov	16 September 1984	Baku		
Armenia	21.15 (NWI)	Hovanes Mkrtchian	7 July 1991	Volgograd		
Bangladesh	21.15 (±0.0 m/s)	Mohamed Mahbub Alam	28 September 1999	Kathmandu		
Kyrgyzstan	21.19 #	Aleksandr Zolotukhin	23 July 2004	Bishkek		
Malawi	21.2 h NWI	Odiya Silweya	21 June 1987	Zomba		
Gibraltar	21.20 (+0.9 m/s) A #	Jessy Franco	13 February 2016	Pretoria		
Palestine	21.26 (−0.3 m/s)	Mohammed Abukhousa	13 June 2014	Colmar		
Tanzania	21.27 (−0.1 m/s)	Ali Khamis Gulam	16 September 2015	Brazzaville		
Gibraltar	21.31 (+0.9 m/s)	Jessy Franco	24 June 2019	Gibraltar		
Macedonia	21.32 (+0.1 m/s)	Jovan Stojoski	30 June 2019	Sarajevo		
Myanmar	21.36 #	Kyaw Htoo Aung	3 December 1991	Manila		
Seychelles	21.1 h (+0.9 m/s)	Leeroy Henriette	1 June 2013	Gaborone		
Brunei	21.39 (−0.6 m/s)	Muhammad Noor Firdaus Ar-Rasyid	23 August 2017	Bukit Jalil		
Somalia	21.4 h NWI	Mohamed Yusuf	1968	Mogadishu		
Tonga	21.4 h NWI	Toluta'u Koula	5 August 1994	San Francisco		
Macedonia	21.40 (+1.0 m/s)	Jovan Stojoski	19 May 2019	Belgrade		
Mauritania	21.40 (+1.6 m/s)	Cheikh Diagana	24 June 2006	Hérouville		
Montenegro	21.44 (−0.5 m/s)	Luka Rakić	22 June 2015	Baku		
Macau	21.45 (+1.5 m/s)	Chan Kin Wa	29 April 2023	Hong Kong		
Nicaragua	21.18 (+1.4 m/s)	Yeykell Romero	2 July 2022	Managua		
Nepal	21.5 h	Tilak Ram Tharu	24 February 2013	Kathmandu		
Macedonia	21.5 h	Ismail Mačev	28 June 1981	Skopje		
Cape Verde	21.5 h (+0.7 m/s) #	Ronaldinho Oliveira	1 July 2015	Lisbon		
Mongolia	21.53 (+0.8 m/s)	Achitbileg Battulga	30 September 2014	Incheon		
Kosovo	21.53 (+1.5 m/s)	Lirim Emerllahu	2 April 2022	San Antonio		
Vanuatu	21.57 (−2.7 m/s)	Moses Kamut	19 August 2007	Cairns		
Federated States of Micronesia	21.65 (+1.4 m/s)	John Howard	27 June 2003	Apia		
Macedonia	21.65 (−1.2 m/s)	Riste Pandev	6 July 2014	La Chaux-de-Fonds		
Cape Verde	21.65 (−2.2 m/s)	Eskilson Nascimento	26 July 2017	Abidjan		
Afghanistan	21.65 (+0.3 m/s)	Sha Mahmood Noor Zahi	30 May 2022	Mashhad		
Nauru	21.7 h (NWI)	Fredrick Cannon	31 January 1994	Meneñ		
New Caledonia	21.7 h (NWI)	Joseph Wéjièmé	16 July 1975	-		
New Caledonia	21.7 h (NWI)	Stéphane Forest	4 October 1986	-		
New Caledonia	21.7 h (NWI)	Mickael Tafilagi	16 November 1990	-		
Palau	21.7 h (NWI)	Christopher Adolf	27 March 2002	Adelaide		
Guam	21.75 (+0.7 m/s)	David Wilson	1 March 1996	Canberra		
Palau	21.84 (+0.7 m/s)	Rodman Teltull	8 March 2015	Brisbane		
Cambodia	21.85 (+0.1 m/s)	Pin Wanheab	30 June 2012	Nottwil		
Solomon Islands	21.85 (−0.7 m/s)	Chris Walasi	14 December 2005	Hamilton		
Monaco	21.89 (−0.1 m/s)	Sébastien Gattuso	5 June 2003	Marsa		
Andorra	21.89 (+2.0 m/s)	Guillem Arderiu Vilanova	30 March 2025	Andorra la Vella		
Nauru	21.96 (−0.4 m/s)	Jonah Harris	10 April 2018	Gold Coast		
Niue	22.00 (+1.0 m/s)	Lagaua Patuavalu a.k.a. Isaac Tatoa	19 March 2011	Auckland		
Yemen	22.27 (+0.5 m/s)	Ahmed Al-Yaari	5 July 2023	Oran		
American Samoa	22.4 h (NWI)	Kelsey Nakanelua	19 March 2000	Honolulu		
American Samoa	22.4 h (NWI)	Kelsey Nakanelua	21 June 1997	Punahou		
Northern Mariana Islands	22.40 (+1.6 m/s)	Tyrone Omar	September 6, 2007	Apia		
American Samoa	22.43 (+0.2 m/s)	Faresa Kapisi	16 March 2014	Sydney		
Tuvalu	23.08 (+0.7 m/s)	Kanaee Saloa Tauia	6 August 2009	Gold Coast		
Tuvalu	23.08 (−0.9 m/s)	Kanaee Saloa Tauia	17 July 2019	Apia		
Rwanda	22.17	Emmanuel Rubayiza	19 April 1997	Athens		
Norfolk Island	22.34	Jonathan McKee	19 July 1986	Halmstad		
Kiribati	22.34 (−1.3 m/s)	Kenaz Kaniwete	23 May 2026	Darwin		
Djibouti	22.43 (NWI)	Farhan Hassan Arrey	5 June 2014	Riyadh		
Bhutan	22.46 #	Robin Thamang	12 December 2001	Phuntsholing		
Cook Islands	22.46 (+0.8 m/s)	Teinakore Teiti	25 August 2000	Adelaide		
Wallis and Futuna	22.8 h (NWI)	Jacques Pothin	8 October 1967	Nouméa		
Bhutan	22.83 (+0.5 m/s)	Tshering Penjor	15 July 2023	Bangkok		
Bhutan	22.83 (−3.0 m/s)	Tshering Penjor	1 October 2023	Hangzhou		
Wallis and Futuna	23.24	Womomagi Tuikalepa	15 September 1996	Montpellier		
Timor-Leste	23.89	J. Mezias	9 September 1994	Jakarta		

=== Women ===
Country	Time	Athlete	Date	Place	Ref.
United States	21.34 (+1.3 m/s)	Florence Griffith Joyner	29 September 1988	Seoul	
Jamaica	21.41 (+0.1 m/s)	Shericka Jackson	25 August 2023	Budapest	
Saint Lucia	21.51 (+0.9 m/s)	Julien Alfred	10 July 2026	Monaco	
Netherlands	21.63 (+0.2 m/s)	Dafne Schippers	28 August 2015	Beijing	
British Virgin Islands	21.68 (−0.4 m/s)	Adaejah Hodge	13 June 2026	Eugene	
Germany	21.71 (+0.7 m/s); 21.71 (+0.3 m/s); 21.71 (+1.2 m/s); 21.71 (−0.8 m/s)	Marita Koch; Marita Koch; Heike Drechsler; Heike Drechsler	10 June 1979; 21 July 1984; 29 June 1986; 29 August 1986	Karl Marx Stadt; Potsdam; Jena; Stuttgart	
Bahamas	21.74 (−0.4 m/s)	Shaunae Miller-Uibo	29 August 2019	Zurich	
Namibia	21.78 (+0.6 m/s)	Christine Mboma	9 September 2021	Zürich	
Russia	21.87 (±0.0 m/s); 21.82 (+3.1 m/s) w	Irina Privalova	25 July 1995; 6 July 1994	Monaco; Lausanne	
Great Britain	21.88 (+0.9 m/s)	Dina Asher-Smith	2 October 2019	Doha	
Nigeria	21.96 (+1.3 m/s)	Favour Ofili	15 April 2022	Gainesville	
Czech Republic	21.97 (+1.9 m/s)	Jarmila Kratochvílová	6 June 1981	Bratislava	
Niger	21.98 (+1.1 m/s)	Aminatou Seyni	18 July 2022	Eugene	
France	21.99 (+1.1 m/s)	Marie-José Pérec	2 July 1993	Villeneuve-d'Ascq	
Bulgaria	22.01 (−0.5 m/s)	Anelia Nuneva	16 August 1987	Sofia	
China	22.01 (±0.0 m/s)	Li Xuemei	22 October 1997	Shanghai	
Switzerland	22.05 (+2.0 m/s)	Mujinga Kambundji	19 July 2022	Eugene	
South Africa	22.06 (+0.7 m/s) A	Evette De Klerk	8 April 1989	Pietersburg	
Ivory Coast	22.08 (+0.8 m/s)	Marie-Josée Ta Lou	11 August 2017	London	
Poland	22.13 (+1.2 m/s)	Ewa Kasprzyk	8 July 1986	Moscow	
Ukraine	22.17 (−2.3 m/s) A	Zhanna Pintusevich	9 July 1997	Sierra Nevada	
Spain	22.19 (+0.8 m/s)	Jaël Bestué	29 June 2025	Madrid	
Belgium	22.20 (+2.0 m/s)	Kim Gevaert	9 July 2006	Brussels	
Uzbekistan	22.22 (+1.2 m/s)	Elvira Barbashina	8 July 1986	Moscow	
Australia	22.23 (+0.8 m/s); 22.18 (+2.8 m/s) w A	Melinda Gainsford-Taylor	13 July 1997; 18 March 2000	Stuttgart; Pietersburg	
Puerto Rico	22.23 (+1.8 m/s) A 22.21 (+4.8 m/s) w	Carol Rodríguez; Jasmine Camacho-Quinn	27 May 2006; 25 May 2018	Provo; Tampa	
Georgia	22.24 (+0.1 m/s)	Maya Azarashvili	16 August 1988	Kyiv	
Trinidad and Tobago	22.25 (+0.8 m/s); 22.01 (+2.9 m/s) w	Michelle-Lee Ahye	16 August 2016; 25 April 2015	Rio de Janeiro; San Antonio	
Sri Lanka	22.28 (+0.7 m/s)	Susanthika Jayasinghe	28 September 2000	Sydney	
Dominican Republic	22.30 (+1.0 m/s)	Marileidy Paulino	4 May 2025	Miramar	
Ireland	22.34 (+1.8 m/s)	Rhasidat Adeleke	14 April 2023	Gainesville	
Romania	22.35 (+1.3 m/s)	Ionela Târlea	13 May 1999	Doha	
Canada	22.36 (+1.1 m/s); 22.25 (+0.8 m/s) A X 22.19 (+3.1 m/s) w A	Audrey Leduc; Angella Taylor; Angella Taylor	31 May 2024; 20 July 1982; 21 July 1982	Atlanta; Colorado Springs; Colorado Springs	
Finland	22.39 (+0.6 m/s)	Mona-Lisa Pursiainen	20 August 1973	Moscow	
Cayman Islands	22.39 (+1.1 m/s); 22.26 (+3.8 m/s) w	Cydonie Mothersill	10 July 2005; 11 July 2005	Nassau	
Cameroon	22.41 (+0.2 m/s)	Myriam Léonie Mani	21 May 2000	Cayenne	
Egypt	22.41 (+1.4 m/s)	Bassant Hemida	4 June 2023	Hengelo	
Bahrain	22.43 (+0.9 m/s)	Edidiong Odiong	9 June 2022	Eugene	
Saint Kitts and Nevis	22.45 (+1.4 m/s)	Tameka Williams	3 June 2012	Basseterre	
Mexico	22.45 (+1.4 m/s)	Cecilia Tamayo-Garza	14 May 2023	Tampa	
U.S. Virgin Islands	22.46 (+0.3 m/s)	Laverne Jones-Ferrette	1 June 2009	Hengelo	
Brazil	22.47 (+1.4 m/s)	Vitoria Cristina Rosa	19 July 2022	Eugene	
Latvia	22.49 (+1.7 m/s)	Vineta Ikauniece	23 May 1987	Tsakhadzor	
Mongolia	24.52 (−0.3 m/s)	Munkhkherlen Tsoodol	10 July 2026	Ordos City	
Venezuela	22.53 (+0.1 m/s)	Nercely Soto	12 May 2012	Caracas	
Norway	22.55 (+1.6 m/s); 22.51 (+2.5 m/s) w	Henriette Jæger; Line Kloster	25 July 2026; 3 July 2022	Trondheim; La Chaux-de-Fonds	
Chinese Taipei	22.56 (−0.3 m/s); 22.4 h (+0.8 m/s)	Wang Huei-chen; Cheng Chi	30 October 1992; 12 July 1970	Yilan City; Munich	
Italy	22.56 (+1.9 m/s); 22.45 (+3.8 m/s) w	Libania Grenot	27 May 2016; 2 June 2012	Tampa; Clermont	
Singapore	22.57 (−0.4 m/s)	Veronica Shanti Pereira	23 August 2023	Budapest	
Gambia	22.58 (+1.8 m/s)	Gina Bass	30 August 2019	Rabat	
Barbados	22.59 (+1.5 m/s)	Sada Williams	9 March 2024	Spanish Town	
Denmark	22.60 (+1.4 m/s)	Ida Karstoft	12 April 2024	Gainesville	
Cyprus	22.61 (+0.1 m/s)	Eleni Artymata	31 July 2010	Barcelona	
Portugal	22.61 (+0.8 m/s)	Lorène Bazolo	29 June 2025	Madrid	
Senegal	22.64 (+1.0 m/s) A	Aida Diop	2 July 2000	Mexico City	
Hungary	22.65 (−0.3 m/s)	Boglárka Takács	29 June 2025	Madrid	
Kazakhstan	22.66 (+0.7 m/s)	Viktoriya Zyabkina	26 June 2016	Almaty	
Antigua and Barbuda	22.66 (−0.2 m/s)	Joella Lloyd	9 June 2022	Eugene	
Greece	22.67 (+0.9 m/s); 22.64 (+2.5 m/s) w	Katerina Koffa	16 June 1996; 9 July 1997	Athens; Thessaloniki	
Grenada	22.67 (+1.7 m/s)	Sherry Fletcher	9 June 2007	Sacramento	
Ghana	22.67 (+0.9 m/s)	Janet Amponsah	21 April 2018	Auburn	
Slovakia	22.67 (−0.1 m/s)	Emma Zapletalová	25 July 2026	Banská Bystrica	
Belarus	22.68 (+0.3 m/s); 22.3 h (±0.0 m/s) (Note: Not accepted by World Athletics)	Natallia Safronnikava	24 June 2001; 4 May 1998	Bremen; Minsk	
Cuba	22.68 (+0.7 m/s); 22.3 h (+0.6 m/s) #	Roxana Díaz; Virgen Benavides	4 July 2007; 30 November 2002	Salamanca; Havana	
Zambia	22.69 (−0.2 m/s) A 22.65 (?) A (Note: Race results not included by World Athletics)	Rhoda Njobvu	10 April 2021; 12 June 2021	Lusaka; Gaborone	
Sweden	22.69 (+1.6 m/s)	Julia Henriksson	17 August 2024	Sollentuna	
Austria	22.70 (+0.1 m/s)	Karin Mayr-Krifka	7 July 2002	Linz	
Mali	22.70 (+1.5 m/s)	Kadiatou Camara	4 May 2008	Addis Ababa	
Colombia	22.70 (−0.4 m/s) A 22.4 (?) A #	Lina Licona; Ximena Restrepo	9 June 2024; 27 July 1991	Cochabamba; Medellín	
Turkey	22.71 (−0.3 m/s)	Nora Güner	12 May 2002	İzmir	
Slovenia	22.72 (+1.4 m/s)	Merlene Ottey	23 August 2004	Athens	
Tajikistan	22.72 (−0.6 m/s)	Gulsumbi Sharifova	15 May 2021	Tashkent	
Chad	22.73 (+0.9 m/s); 22.55 (+2.9 m/s) w	Kaltouma Nadjina	23 June 2002	Edmonton	
Ecuador	22.74 (−0.1 m/s); 22.56 (+2.5 m/s) w	Gabriela Anahi Suarez	19 July 2022; 18 July 2022	Eugene	
Japan	22.79 (+1.0 m/s)	Fuka Idoabigeiru (Note: by JAAF source; Abigeirufuka Ido by World Athletics source)	3 August 2025	Fujiyoshida	
Saint Vincent	22.80 (+1.4 m/s)	Natasha Joe-Mayers	29 May 2002	Baton Rouge	
Benin	22.81 (+0.7 m/s)	Fabienne Feraez	16 July 2005	Angers	
New Zealand	22.81 (+1.8 m/s)	Rosie Elliott	19 February 2023	Christchurch	
India	22.82 (+0.8 m/s)	Saraswati Dey-Saha	28 August 2002	Ludhiana	
Chile	22.82 (+1.1 m/s)	Martina Weil	3 August 2025	Brussels	
Botswana	22.84 (+0.1 m/s)	Tsaone Bakani Sebele	25 June 2024	Douala	
Liberia	22.87 (+1.1 m/s)	Thelma Davies	6 June 2024	Eugene	
Malawi	22.91 (+0.3 m/s)	Asimenye Simwaka	25 June 2024	Douala	
Argentina	22.94 A	Beatriz Allocco	11 November 1978	La Paz	
Guyana	22.94 (+1.1 m/s); 22.59 (+2.7 m/s) w	Brenessa Thompson	11 May 2017; 25 March 2017	Columbia; San Antonio	
Iraq	22.97 (+1.3 m/s); 22.51 (±0.0 m/s) X (Note: Danah Hussein tested positive after this race for two banned substances.)	Dana Hussain	6 June 2021; 20 June 2021	Bursa; Radès	
Belize	22.98 (+1.7 m/s)	Emma Wade	28 May 2004	Gainesville	
Lithuania	22.99 (+1.3 m/s)	Agnė Šerkšnienė	14 July 2018	Zofingen	
Philippines	23.01 (±0.0 m/s)	Kristina Marie Knott	7 December 2019	New Clark City	
Congo Republic	23.01 (−0.2 m/s)	Natacha Ngoye	3 August 2023	Kinshasa	
Estonia	23.04 (+1.2 m/s)	Ann Marii Kivikas	23 July 2025	Tampere	
Bermuda	23.05	Debbie Jones	10 June 1977	Los Angeles	
Haiti	23.06 (−0.3 m/s)	Marlena Wesh	21 April 2012	Charlottesville	
Kyrgyzstan	23.08 (±0.0 m/s)	Mariya Kulchunova	11 September 1976	Erfurt or Moscow	
Madagascar	23.09 (−1.1 m/s) A	Rosa Rakotozafy	10 April 1999	Pretoria	
Kenya	23.12 (−0.5 m/s) A 22.4 h (NWI) A 22.87 (+3.0 m/s) w A	Maximila Imali; Joyce Sakari; Milcent Ndoro	24 June 2022; 11 July 2015; 6 March 2024	Kasarani; Nairobi; Nairobi	
Papua New Guinea	23.13 (+1.5 m/s); 23.09 (+2.1 m/s) w	Toea Wisil	12 March 2017; 6 April 2013	Canberra; Melbourne	
Croatia	23.14; 23.1 h	Jelica Pavličić	3 August 1974; 1 June 1975	Sofia; Zagreb	
Vietnam	23.14 (+1.0 m/s)	Lê Thị Cẩm Tú	13 December 2025	Bangkok	
Israel	23.15 (+2.0 m/s)	Irina Lenskiy	23 June 2002	Belgrade	
Luxembourg	23.19 (+1.0 m/s)	Patrizia Van Der Weken	22 June 2023	Chorzów	
São Tomé and Príncipe	23.19 (+1.7 m/s)	Gorete Semedo	18 May 2024	Lisbon	
Fiji	23.22 (+1.9 m/s)	Makelesi Batimala	20 July 2008	Heusden-Zolder	
Uganda	23.22	Scovia Ayikoru	26 February 2023	Boston	
Morocco	23.22 (−0.7 m/s); 23.0 h	Sara El Hachimi; Nezha Bidouane	4 August 2023; 6 August 2000	Kinshasa; Rabat	
Iran	23.22 (+1.2 m/s) A 23.21 (+3.1 m/s) w	Maryam Toosi	25 May 2024; 2 March 2024	Bogotá; Long Beach	
Zimbabwe	23.23 (±0.0 m/s) A	Winneth Dube	4 April 2003	Pretoria	
Sierra Leone	23.27 (+0.4 m/s); 23.20 (+3.1 m/s) w	Maggie Barrie	21 April 2018; 27 April 2018	Columbus; Des Moines	
Serbia	23.28 (±0.0 m/s)	Marina Filipović	17 June 1997	Bari	
Panama	23.29 (−0.2 m/s)	Cristal Chenoa Cuervo	14 May 2023	Fairfax	
Thailand	23.30 (−0.7 m/s)	Supavadee Khawpeag	16 September 2001	Kuala Lumpur	
Malaysia	23.33 (−0.4 m/s)	Shereen Vallabouy	4 August 2023	Memphis	
United Arab Emirates	23.33 (−0.1 m/s)	Aminat Kamarudeen	5 September 2026	Muscat	
Burkina Faso	23.34 (+1.7 m/s)	Sarah Tonde	23 July 2005	Ouagadougou	
Algeria	23.38 (−0.1 m/s)	Yasmina Azzizi-Kettab	16 May 1992	Brescia	
Myanmar	23.38	Kay Khine Lwin	24 September 2005	Penang	
Iceland	23.44 (+1.1 m/s)	Eir Chang Hlésdóttir	25 June 2025	Maribor	
Sudan	23.46 (+0.9 m/s)	Hiba Saeed	19 April 2024	Fayetteville	
Suriname	23.47 (+0.7 m/s); 23.42 (+2.8 m/s) w	Kirsten Nieuwendam; Sunayna Wahi	4 May 2012; 24 June 2017	University Park; Asunción	
Eswatini	23.47 (−0.7 m/s)	Phumlile Ndzinisa	16 September 2015	Brazzaville	
Turks and Caicos	23.48 (+1.2 m/s)	Yanique Haye-Smith	20 April 2019	Baltimore	
Moldova	23.54 (+1.8 m/s)	Iana Burtasencova	13 June 1993	Rotterdam	
Gabon	23.54 (+0.9 m/s) A	Ruddy Zang Milama	31 July 2010	Nairobi	
Peru	23.55 A	Carmela Bolivár	11 November 1978	La Paz	
Albania	23.55 (+0.9 m/s); 23.27 (NWI)	Klodiana Shala	10 August 2006; 7 June 2012	Gothenburg; Tirana	
Lebanon	23.56 (+1.4 m/s)	Greta Taslakian	24 November 2007	Cairo	
Nicaragua	23.61 (+1.2 m/s)	María Carmona	5 August 2026	Santo Domingo	
Indonesia	23.63 (−1.2 m/s)	Nella Agustin	29 May 2024	Chongqing	
Lesotho	23.63 A (+0.7 m/s)	Mamakoli Senauoane	21 February 2026	Pretoria	
Azerbaijan	23.64 (+1.5 m/s); 23.56 (+2.4 m/s) w	Zakiyya Hasanova	30 June 2018; 9 June 2018	Almaty; Schaan	
San Marino	23.65 (+1.0 m/s)	Alessandra Gasparelli	5 May 2024	Modena	
South Korea	23.69 (−0.1 m/s)	Kim Ha-Na	21 October 2009	Daejeon	
Pakistan	23.69 (+0.7 m/s) A 23.6 h (?)	Najma Parveen; Sadaf Siddiqui	4 December 2019; 14 March 2009	Kathmandu; Lahore	
Turkmenistan	23.70 (+2.0 m/s)	Alyona Petrova	7 June 2008	Almaty	
Costa Rica	23.70 (+1.9 m/s); 23.51 (+5.4 m/s) w	Sharolyn Joseph	23 July 2015; 27 June 2015	Toronto; Managua	
Guatemala	23.72 (+1.9 m/s); 23.6 h (NWI); 23.85 (−1.6 m/s)	Mariandree Chacón; Christa Schumann-Lottmann; Mariandree Chacón	29 April 2023; 29 August 1986; 4 June 2023	Jacksonville "Klim"; Guatemala City	
Kuwait	23.74 (+1.5 m/s); 23.56 (+3.8 m/s) w A	Mudhawi Al-Shammari	18 May 2022; 11 August 2022	Kuwait City; Konya	
Malta	23.74 (+1.5 m/s)	Carla Scicluna	3 June 2023	Marsa	
Uruguay	23.78 (±0.0 m/s) A	Claudia Acerenza	23 July 1988	Mexico City	
Syria	23.78 (+0.6 m/s)	Ghada Shouaa	25 May 1996	Götzis	
Hong Kong	23.79 (±0.0 m/s)	Kin Yee Wan	16 May 1999	Xi'an	
Ethiopia	23.83 A 23.84 (−1.6 m/s) A 23.76 (+2.2 m/s) w	Selam Abrhaley Takere; Tegest Tamangnu; Fantu Magiso	30 June 2013; 8 March 2015; 14 May 2011	Addis Ababa; Addis Ababa; Gaborone	
Mozambique	23.86 (?)	Maria Mutola	20 July 1994	Langenthal	
South Sudan	23.90 A (+1.2 m/s)	Lucia Moris	11 April 2026	Lang'ata	
Tunisia	23.95 (+0.4 m/s); 23.93 (+2.6 m/s) w	Awatef Ben Hassine; Awatef Hamrouni	27 July 2002; 13 September 2001	Ninove; Tunis	
Central African Republic	23.97 (+1.8 m/s)	Emmanuelle Kogalama	21 June 1998	Viry-Châtillon	
Mauritius	24.00 (−1.3 m/s)	Mary Jane Vincent	13 April 2013	Kingston	
Dominica	24.01 (+1.9 m/s)	Luan Gabriel	3 May 2018	Greensboro	
Comoros	24.08 (−1.4 m/s)	Feta Ahamada	30 June 2012	Porto-Novo	
Paraguay	24.12 (+0.8 m/s)	Xenia Hiebert	23 March 2024	Asunción	
Liechtenstein	24.14 (+1.5 m/s); 24.11 (+3.1 m/s) w 24.1 h (NWI)	Manuela Marxer; Yvonne Hasler; Yvonne Hasler	28 May 1994; 17 June 1989; 14 August 1988	Götzis; Götzis; Zug	
Bolivia	24.15 (−0.4 m/s) A	Alini Delgadillo	9 June 2024	Cochabamba	
Cook Islands	24.16 (+0.3 m/s)	Patricia Taea	14 December 2017	Port Vila	
Bangladesh	24.2 h NWI	Shirin Akter	4 April 2021	Dhaka	
Tanzania	24.22; 23.92 (NWI)	Nzaeli Kyomo	28 July 1980; 2 August 1979	Moscow; Dakar	
North Macedonia	24.24 (+0.6 m/s); 23.75 (NWI); 24.06 (NWI)	Vera Veljanovska; Aleksandra Vojnevska; Vera Veljanovska	26 August 1973; 27 June 2004; 3 August 1974	Duisburg; Skopje; Sofia	
Guam	24.24 (+1.7 m/s)	Regine Tugade	1 December 2023	Beijing	
Congo DR	24.26 (−0.9 m/s)	Cynthia Bolingo	4 June 2011	Oordegem	
Armenia	24.30 (+0.9 m/s); 23.16 (+1.2 m/s) (Note: Reported without an asterisk at World Athletics, but not ratified (or later rescinded) by AAF.); 23.18 (+0.1 m/s)	Gayane Chiloyan; Gayane Chiloyan; Diana Khubeseryan	16 July 2016; 29 May 2016; 25 May 2016	Tbilisi; Artashat; Almaty	
Seychelles	24.35 (+1.9 m/s)	Natasha Chetty	12 April 2024	Long Beach	
Angola	24.40 (+1.0 m/s) (Note: Listed by World Athletics as Adriana Alves' (legal) personal best, but not as the Angolan national record in their 2022 list of national records.); 24.61 (+0.3 m/s)	Adriana Alves	17 June 2018; 17 June 2017	Abrantes; Lisbon	
Bosnia and Herzegovina	24.42 (+0.1 m/s)	Ajla Reizbegović	3 August 2025	Zenica	
Macao	24.65 (+0.2 m/s)	Loi Im Lan	14 May 2023	Guangzhou	
Samoa	24.99 (−0.2 m/s)	Talava Tavui	31 March 2006	Palo Alto	
Honduras	25.02 (+1.5 m/s)	Heidy Palacios	16 June 2012	Managua	
Saudi Arabia	25.18 (+2.0 m/s)	Lujain Ibrahim Al-Humaid	4 May 2025	Bir El Djir	
Gibraltar	25.55 (−0.7 m/s)	Sharon Mifsud	27 June 1991	Mariehamn	
Solomon Islands	25.6 h (NWI)	Jenny Keni	1 August 2004	Cairns	
American Samoa	26.66 (±0.0 m/s)	Filomenaleonisa Iakopo	29 November 2023	Honiara	
Montserrat	26.69 (NWI)	Jenalyn Weekes	28 February 2016	Vieux-Fort	
Afghanistan	27.39 (−0.2 m/s)	Kamia Yousufi	17 March 2024	Sydney	
Djibouti	27.83 (+1.2 m/s)	Hasna Idriss Goumanes	25 March 2017	Djibouti City	

== Indoor ==
=== Men ===
Country	Time	Athlete	Date	Place	Ref.
Namibia	19.92	Frank Fredericks	18 February 1996	Liévin	
United States	20.02	Elijah Hall-Thompson	10 March 2018	College Station	
Nigeria	20.08	Divine Oduduru	23 February 2019	Lubbock	
Zimbabwe	20.13	Makanakaishe Charamba	27 February 2025	College Station	
Uganda	20.17 A	Tarsis Gracious Orogot	10 March 2023	Albuquerque	
Bahamas	20.21	Terrence Jones	24 February 2024	Lubbock	
Great Britain	20.25	Linford Christie	19 February 1995	Liévin	
Barbados	20.26	Obadele Thompson	6 March 1999	Maebashi	
Canada	20.26	Andre De Grasse	14 March 2015	Fayetteville	
Cayman Islands	20.27	Jaden Reid	27 February 2025	College Station	
Ivory Coast	20.30	Cheickna Traore	9 March 2024	Boston	
Trinidad and Tobago	20.31	Jereem Richards	11 March 2017	College Station	
France	20.36	Bruno Marie-Rose	22 February 1987	Liévin	
Ukraine	20.40	Serhiy Osovych	1 March 1998	Valencia	
Bulgaria	20.41	Nikolay Antonov	29 February 1992	Genoa	
South Africa	20.41	Shaun Maswanganyi	24 February 2024	Lubbock	
Germany	20.42	Sebastian Ernst	27 February 2011	Leipzig	
Jamaica	20.42	Demar Francis	23 February 2024	Lubbock	
Sweden	20.43	Erik Erlandsson	17 January 2025	Växjö	
Sweden	20.43	Erik Erlandsson	4 February 2025	Ostrava	
Cuba	20.46	Ivan García	8 March 1997	Paris	
Cameroon	20.47	Joseph Batangdon	2 March 2003	Clermont-Ferrand	
Suriname	20.48	Issamade Asinga	12 March 2023	Boston	
Norway	20.51	Geir Moen	19 February 1995	Liévin	
Italy	20.52	Stefano Tilli	21 February 1985	Turin	
Saint Kitts and Nevis	20.52	Kim Collins	10 March 2000	Fayetteville	
Czech Republic	20.52	Pavel Maslák	16 February 2014	Prague	
Russia	20.53	Vladimir Krylov	22 February 1987	Liévin	
Poland	20.55	Marcin Urbaś	1 March 2002	Vienna	
Ghana	20.57	Joseph Paul Amoah; Benjamin Azamati	5 February 2022; 26 February 2022	Boston; Lubbock	
Grenada	20.58 A	Kirani James	21 January 2011	Albuquerque	
Greece	20.62	Alexios Alexopoulos	12 February 1996	Piraeus	
Japan	20.63	Koji Ito	5 March 1999	Maebashi	
Estonia	20.63	Marek Niit	15 February 2014	Fayetteville	
Ireland	20.64	Mark Smyth	11 March 2023	Dublin	
Brazil	20.65	Robson Da Silva	26 February 1989	Sindelfingen	
Cyprus	20.65	Anninos Markoullides	1 March 1998	Valencia	
Spain	20.65	Adrià Alfonso	23 February 2025	Madrid	
Belgium	20.66	Patrick Stevens; Erik Wijmeersch	19 February 1995; 12 February 1997	Liévin; Ghent	
Israel	20.69	Blessing Akwasi Afrifah	10 February 2024	Liévin	
Panama	20.70	Alonso Edward	13 February 2010	Fayetteville	
Australia	20.71	Damien Marsh	14 March 1993	Toronto	
Finland	20.72	Jonathan Åstrand	9 February 2013	Växjö	
China	20.75	Zhang Peimeng	30 March 2013	Beijing	
Hungary	20.75	Tamás Máté	19 February 2023	Nyíregyháza	
Guyana	20.76	Winston George	10 February 2018	Boston	
Liberia	20.76	Akeem Sirleaf	9 February 2019	Fayetteville	
Saint Lucia	20.76 A	Michael Joseph	28 February 2025	Lubbock	
Bermuda	20.77	Troy Douglas	7 March 1997	Paris	
Netherlands	20.77	Patrick van Balkom	9 March 2001	Lisbon	
Slovenia	20.77	Matic Osovnikar	14 March 2003	Birmingham	
Samoa	20.79 A	Jeremy Dodson	9 February 2018	Albuquerque	
Zambia	20.80	Gerald Phiri	22 January 2011	College Station	
Puerto Rico	20.81	Marquis Sean Holston	9 March 2012	Nampa	
Mexico	20.81 A	José Carlos Herrera	24 January 2014	Albuquerque	
Austria	20.82	Christoph Pöstinger	25 February 1996	Vienna	
Netherlands Antilles	20.84	Brendan Christian	14 March 2003	Fayetteville	
Haiti	20.84	Christopher Borzor	29 February 2020	Birmingham	
Kenya	20.85	Paulvince Obuon	6 March 2004	Allston	
Mali	20.88	Fodé Sissoko	21 February 2021	Miramas	
Montserrat	20.89	Julius Morris	25 February 2018	Boston	
Senegal	20.90	Oumar Loum	19 February 1995	Liévin	
Colombia	20.91	John Paredes	27 February 2026	Lubbock	
Switzerland	20.92	Felix Svensson	21 January 2024	Luxembourg	
Slovakia	20.93	Matej Baluch	21 February 2025	Ostrava	
Romania	20.94	Ionut Lucian Vieru	18 January 2004	Mannheim	
Turkey	20.94	Oğuz Uyar	15 February 2025	Lubbock	
Kazakhstan	20.95	Gennadiy Chernovol	18 February 2001	Tianjin	
Mauritius	20.95	Jean-Yann De Grace	4 February 2018	Aubiére	
Comoros	20.95	Hachim Maaroufou	18 February 2024	Miramas	
Denmark	20.97	Benjamin Lobo Vedel	22 February 2019	Fayetteville	
Chile	20.98	Sebastian Keitel	11 March 1995	Barcelona	
Venezuela	20.99	Jose Acevedo	14 March 2008	Fayetteville	
Lebanon	21.00	Noureddine Hadid	21 February 2025	Fayetteville	
New Zealand	21.01	Chris Donaldson	5 March 1999	Maebashi	
Portugal	21.01	João Coelho	27 February 2022	Pombal	
Central African Republic	21.02	Valentin Ngbogo	12 January 1995	Liévin	
Saint Vincent and the Grenadines	21.02	Kimorie Shearman	15 February 2020	Boston	
Gabon	21.02	Guy Maganga Gorra	13 February 2021	Lynchburg	
Dominican Republic	21.03	Stanly Del Carmen	13 February 2016	Boston	
Iceland	21.03	Kolbeinn Höður Gunnarsson	5 February 2023	Reykjavík	
Lithuania	21.05	Tomas Keršulis	11 February 2023	Boston	
Argentina	21.08	Carlos Gats	5 March 1999	Maebashi	
British Virgin Islands	21.08	Jaleel Croal	23 February 2024	Birmingham	
Croatia	21.09	Roko Farkaš	30 January 2024	Ostrava	
Luxembourg	21.12	Daniel Abenzoar-Foulé	27 January 2006	Luxembourg	
Ecuador	21.12	Alex Quiñónez	2 February 2019	San Sebastián	
U.S. Virgin Islands	21.13	Tabarie Henry	16 January 2010	College Station	
Philippines	21.13 A	Umajesty Williams	27 January 2023	Albuquerque	
Aruba	21.14	Miguel Janssen	1 February 1998	Ghent	
Belarus	21.14	Aliaksandr Linnik	11 February 2012	Fayetteville	
Morocco	21.19	Aziz Ouhadi	8 February 2011	Liévin	
Latvia	21.19	Oskars Grava	18 February 2024	Valmiera	
Democratic Republic of the Congo	21.23	Gary Kikaya	18 January 2003	Blacksburg	
Serbia	21.24	Slobodan Branković	22 February 1989	Turin	
Sudan	21.24	Ahmed Ali	27 January 2018	Clemson	
Gambia	21.24	Momodou Sey	12 February 2022	Boston	
Uruguay	21.36	Heber Viera	6 March 2004	Budapest	
Burkina Faso	21.39	Innocent Bologo	1 March 2020	Liévin	
Belize	21.54	Brandon Jones	8 March 2009	Boston	
Honduras	21.62	Yariel Matute	23 February 2019	Nampa	
Saudi Arabia	21.64 A	Mohammad Yaseen Al-Hasan	14 February 2014	Albuquerque	
Turks and Caicos Islands	21.64	Colby Jennings	28 February 2021	Topeka	
Chinese Taipei	21.66	Yang Chun-han	16 February 2019	Winston-Salem	
Bolivia	21.74 A	Tito Hinojosa	5 February 2021	Cochabamba	
Thailand	21.82	Sompote Suwannarangsri	1 March 2005	Tianjin	
Malta	21.83	Graham Pellegrini	14 February 2026	Athens	
Bahrain	21.87	Adel Mohamed Farhan	7 February 2004	Tehran	
Libya	21.91	Ahmed Amaar	10 December 2021	Bloomington	
Angola	21.93	Miguel Angel Makangu	22 January 2009	Eaubonne	
Pakistan	21.95 (Note: not ratified by national federation but recognised by World Athletics)	Umar Hameed	14 March 2010	Sheffield	
Moldova	21.98	Yuriy Yordanov	12 March 1985	Chișinău	
Kuwait	22.13	Khaled Atiq Al-Johar	9 February 2001	Rasht	
Bosnia and Herzegovina	22.14	Damir Redžepagić	28 January 2018	Belgrade	
Gibraltar	22.19	Jerai Torres	11 February 2018	Sabadell	
Andorra	22.20	Guillem Arderiu Vilanova	1 February 2025	Sabadell	
United Arab Emirates	22.21	Anik Dole	10 February 2024	Boston	
El Salvador	22.25	Jason Alvarez	23 January 2026	New York City	
Iraq	22.39	Ahmed Essam Obeid	14 February 2015	Boston	
Macau	22.42	Chao Un Kei	14 March 2003	Birmingham	
Armenia	22.57	Razmik Mkrtchyan	20 February 2022	Tbilisi	
Afghanistan	22.67	Said Gilani	20 January 2018	Hanover	
Malaysia	22.86	Timothy Tan	27 November 2019	Manchester	
Bangladesh	23.01	Mohamed Masudul Karim	7 February 2004	Tehran	

=== Women ===
Country	Time	Athlete	Date	Place	Ref.
Jamaica	21.87	Merlene Ottey	13 February 1993	Liévin	
Saint Lucia	22.01 A	Julien Alfred	11 March 2023	Albuquerque	
United States	22.09	Abby Steiner	26 February 2022	College Station	
Russia	22.10	Irina Privalova	19 February 1995	Liévin	
Nigeria	22.11 A	Favour Ofili	10 March 2023	Albuquerque	
British Virgin Islands	22.22	Adaejah Hodge	14 March 2026	Fayetteville	
East Germany	22.27	Heike Drechsler	7 March 1987	Indianapolis	
Romania	22.39	Ionela Târlea	6 March 1999	Maebashi	
Bahamas	22.40	Shaunae Miller-Uibo	31 January 2021	Fayetteville	
France	22.49	Muriel Hurtis	14 March 2003	Birmingham	
Germany	22.50	Melanie Paschke	1 March 1998	Valencia	
Ireland	22.52 A	Rhasidat Adeleke	21 January 2023	Albuquerque	
Puerto Rico	22.54	Jasmine Camacho-Quinn	12 February 2022	Louisville	
Great Britain	22.60	Amber Anning	26 January 2024	Fayetteville	
Australia	22.64	Melinda Gainsford	10 March 1995	Barcelona	
Netherlands	22.64	Femke Bol	3 February 2024	Metz	
Poland	22.69	Ewa Kasprzyk	6 March 1988	Budapest	
Niger	22.69	Aminatou Seyni	5 February 2023	Lyon	
Austria	22.70	Karin Mayr-Krifka	2 March 2002	Vienna	
Greece	22.71	Katerina Koffa	21 February 1998	Piraeus	
Czech Republic	22.76	Jarmila Kratochvílová	28 January 1981	Vienna	
Soviet Union	22.79	Tatyana Papilina	6 March 1988	Budapest	
Ivory Coast	22.80	Murielle Ahouré	13 March 2009	College Station	
Spain	22.81	Sandra Myers	15 March 1991	San Sebastián	
Cayman Islands	22.82	Cydonie Mothersill	23 February 2003	Liévin	
Trinidad and Tobago	22.83	Kayelle Clarke	25 February 2018	College Station	
Sweden	22.84	Julia Henriksson	23 February 2025	Växjö	
Bulgaria	22.87	Ivet Lalova-Collio	1 February 2004	Sofia	
Switzerland	22.88	Lea Sprunger	18 February 2018	Magglingen	
Belarus	22.91	Natalya Vinogradova	14 March 2003	Birmingham	
West Germany	22.94	Christina Sussiek	6 February 1981	Sindelfingen	
United States Virgin Islands	22.95	Allison Peter	9 March 2012	Nampa	
Sri Lanka	22.99	Susanthika Jayasinghe	9 March 2001	Lisbon	
Saint Kitts and Nevis	22.99	Virgil Hodge	9 March 2007	Fayetteville	
Norway	22.99	Henriette Jæger	20 January 2024	Bærum	
Canada	23.00 A	Lauren Gale	26 February 2022	Albuquerque	
Grenada	23.02	Hazel-Ann Regis	27 February 2005	Fayetteville	
Guyana	23.02	Brenessa Thompson	26 January 2019	Lubbock	
Finland	23.03	Sanna Kyllönen	14 March 1993	Toronto	
Turkey	23.05	Nora Ivanova	28 January 2003	Vienna	
Georgia	23.07	Maya Azarashvili	5 February 1995	Stuttgart	
Cyprus	23.07	Olivia Fotopoulou	14 February 2026	Athens	
Italy	23.14	Manuela Levorato	2 March 2003	Genoa	
South Africa	23.16	Wendy Seegers	5 March 1999	Maebashi	
Slovenia	23.16	Alenka Bikar	26 February 2000	Ghent	
Barbados	23.16	Tristan Evelyn	29 February 2020	Birmingham, AL	
Luxembourg	23.17	Patrizia van der Weken	19 January 2025	Kirchberg	
Portugal	23.21	Lucrécia Jardim	28 February 1998	Valencia	
Denmark	23.22	Ida Karstoft	13 February 2022	Uppsala	
Uganda	23.22	Scovia Ayikoru	26 February 2023	Boston	
Saint Vincent and the Grenadines	23.24	Kineke Alexander	14 February 2015	Fayetteville	
Kazakhstan	23.25	Svetlana Bodritskaya; Viktoriya Zyabkina	7 March 1997; 30 January 2016	Paris; Oskemen	
Ukraine	23.26	Marina Maydanova	14 March 2003	Birmingham	
Belgium	23.26	Imke Vervaet	19 February 2023	Ghent	
New Zealand	23.27 A	Annalies Kalma	20 February 2026	Reno	
Uzbekistan	23.29	Marina Shmonina	7 February 1992	Moscow	
Chile	23.29	Martina Weil	19 February 2023	Ghent	
Mexico	23.30	Cecilia Tamayo-Garza	11 February 2023	Fayetteville	
Ghana	23.34	Flings Owusu-Agyapong	12 February 2016	Boston	
Bahrain	23.34	Edidiong Odiong	15 January 2022	Clemson	
Cameroon	23.37	Myriam Léonie Mani	11 February 2000	Ghent	
Antigua and Barbuda	23.38	Joella Lloyd	28 January 2023	Clemson	
Hungary	23.38	Alexa Sulyán	23 February 2025	Nyíregyháza	
Lithuania	23.39	Agné Eggerth	5 March 1999	Maebashi	
Philippines	23.39	Kristina Knott	21 February 2025	Fayetteville	
Republic of the Congo	23.41	Natacha Ngoye	21 January 2024	Val-de-Reuil	
Serbia	23.46	Kornelija Šinković	6 March 1988	Budapest	
Slovakia	23.47	Lucia Ivanová	14 March 2003	Birmingham	
Iran	23.47	Maryam Tousi	21 February 2025	Fayetteville	
Haiti	23.47	Marlena Wesh	26 February 2011	Blacksburg	
China	23.52	Jiang Lan	7 March 2013	Nanjing	
Senegal	23.56	Amy Mbacké Thiam	10 February 2009	Liévin	
Latvia	23.58	Gunta Vaičule	19 February 2023	Valmiera	
Colombia	23.60	Samantha González	15 February 2025	Fayetteville	
Panama	23.68	Cristal Cuervo	26 February 2025	Virginia Beach	
Togo	23.70	Judith Akouvi Koumédzina	14 February 2026	Spokane	
Turks and Caicos Islands	23.71	Yanique Haye-Smith	24 February 2019	Boston	
Belize	23.72	Kaina Martinez	26 February 2017	Boston	
Lebanon	23.73 A	Rasha Badrani	6 February 2026	Albuquerque	
Guatemala	23.75	Mariandrée Chacón	28 February 2026	Louisville	
Chinese Taipei	23.81	Wang Huei-chen	9 March 1991	Seville	
Sudan	23.82	Hiba Mahgoub	13 February 2021	Topeka	
San Marino	23.87	Alessandra Gasparelli	10 January 2026	Ancona	
Israel	23.96	Mercy Afrifah	14 February 2026	Athens	
Israel	23.96	Darlene Asante	14 February 2026	Athens	
Gabon	23.97	Pierrick-Linda Moulin	4 February 2024	Aubière	
Zimbabwe	23.97	Vimbayi Maisvorewa	1 February 2025	Clemson	
Malta	24.03	Charlotte Wingfield	4 February 2023	Glasgow	
Venezuela	24.04	Nercely Soto	6 March 2020	Lynchburg	
Croatia	24.11	Veronika Drljačić	11 February 2023	Zagreb	
Moldova	24.12	Lilia Mocanu	15 February 1991	Moscow	
Guam	24.31	Regine Tugade	21 February 2020	Annapolis	
Malaysia	24.34	Shanti Govindasamy	13 March 1993	Toronto	
Argentina	24.41 A	Noelia Martínez	2 February 2020	Cochabamba	
Thailand	24.47	Juthama Thavoncharoen	1 March 2005	Tianjin	
Seychelles	24.55 A	Natasha Chetty	23 February 2024	Albuquerque	
Azerbaijan	24.60	Lamiya Valiyeva	17 January 2026	Baku	
Bolivia	24.69 A	Cecilia Gómez	5 February 2021	Cochabamba	
Armenia	24.70	Gayane Chiloyan	19 February 2017	Istanbul	
Angola	24.82	Antónia de Jesús	1 February 2004	Espinho	
São Tomé and Príncipe	24.85	Gorete Semedo	25 January 2020	Pombal	
Burkina Faso	24.87	Elodie Ouédraogo	28 January 1996	Ghent	
Nicaragua	24.88	Maria Carmona	25 January 2025	Antequera	
Bosnia and Herzegovina	25.04	Ajla Reizbegović	7 February 2026	Vienna	
Uruguay	25.07	Marcela Tiscornia	10 March 1995	Barcelona	
Kenya	25.30	Joyce Odhiambo	6 March 1987	Indianapolis	
Honduras	25.36	Heidy Palacios	5 December 2009	New Haven	
Pakistan	26.0 h	Erum Khanum	12 October 2001	Rasht	
Gibraltar	26.65	Norcady Reyes	11 February 2023	Antequera	
Namibia	26.77	L. van Rensburg	27 February 1999	Birmingham	
United Arab Emirates	27.89	Fatima Ali Hassan Aabdula Alblooshi	14 January 2023	Baku	
Kuwait	27.99 OT	Danah Al-Nasrallah	18 February 2011	Allendale	
Afghanistan	34.84	Yalda Amini	4 February 2017	Helsinki	
