= Haiti at the 2022 World Athletics Championships =

- Flag of Haiti
- WA code: HAI

in Eugene, United States 15 July 2022 – 24 July 2022
- Competitors: 1 (1 woman) in 1 event
- Medals: Gold 0 Silver 0 Bronze 0 Total 0

World Athletics Championships appearances (overview)
- 1987; 1991; 1993; 1995; 1997; 1999; 2001; 2003; 2005; 2007; 2009; 2011; 2013; 2015; 2017; 2019; 2022; 2023; 2025

Haiti competed at the 2022 World Athletics Championships in Eugene, Oregon, United States, which were held from 15 to 24 July 2022. The athlete delegation of the country was composed of one competitor, hurdler Mulern Jean. She qualified upon being selected by the team's athletics federation. She competed in the women's 100 metres and failed to make it past the qualifying heats after not completing the race.

== Background ==
The 2022 World Athletics Championships in Eugene, Oregon, United States, were held from 15 to 24 July 2022. To qualify for the World Championships, athletes had to reach an entry standard (e.g. time and distance), place in a specific position at select competitions, be a wild card entry, or qualify through their World Athletics Ranking at the end of the qualification period.

As Haiti did not meet any of the four standards, they could send either one male or one female athlete in one event of the Championships who has not yet qualified. The Haitian Amateur Athletic Federation selected hurdler Mulern Jean who was set to compete in the women's 100 metres hurdles. She ran a personal and season's best in the event with 12.81 seconds, which was under the qualifying standard of 12.84 seconds, though was set after the qualification period.

== Results ==
Key

- Q = Qualified for the next round
- q = Qualified for the next round as a fastest loser or, in field events, by position without achieving the qualifying target
- NR = National record
- PB = Personal best
- SB = Season best
- N/A = Round not applicable for the event

=== Women ===
Jean competed in the qualifying heats of the women's 100 metres hurdles on 23 July 2022 in the fifth heat against five other competitors. There, she failed to complete the race and was recorded with a "Did not finish" mark, failing to advance to the semifinals.

Track and road events

Athlete	Event	Heat		Semi-final		Final	
Athlete	Event	Result	Rank	Result	Rank	Result	Rank
Mulern Jean	100 m hurdles	Did not finish		Did not advance			
