= Haiti at the 2023 World Athletics Championships =

- Flag of Haiti
- WA code: HAI

in Budapest, Hungary 19 August 2023 – 27 August 2023
- Competitors: 1 (1 man and 0 women)
- Medals: Gold 0 Silver 0 Bronze 0 Total 0

World Athletics Championships appearances (overview)
- 1987; 1991; 1993; 1995; 1997; 1999; 2001; 2003; 2005; 2007; 2009; 2011; 2013; 2015; 2017; 2019; 2022; 2023; 2025

Haiti competed at the 2023 World Athletics Championships in Budapest, Hungary, which were held from 19 to 27 August 2023. The athlete delegation of the country was composed of one competitor, hurdler Yves Cherubin who would compete in the men's 110 metres hurdles. He qualified for the Championships upon being selected by the Haitian Amateur Athletic Federation. In the heats, Cherubin was one of fastest to not place in the top four of any heat and advanced to the semifinals. There, he placed seventh in his round and failed to advance for the finals.

== Background ==
The 2023 World Athletics Championships in Budapest, Hungary, were held from 19 to 27 August 2023. The Championships were held at the National Athletics Centre. To qualify for the World Championships, athletes had to reach an entry standard (e.g. time or distance), place in a specific position at select competitions, be a wild card entry, or qualify through their World Athletics Ranking at the end of the qualification period.

As Haiti did not meet any of the four standards, they could send either one male or one female athlete in one event of the Championships who has not yet qualified. The Haitian Amateur Athletic Federation selected hurdler Yves Cherubin who held a personal best of 13.60 seconds and was ranked 112th in the world at the time of his selection for the Championships. This was Cherubin's first appearance for Haiti at the World Athletics Championships. In the lead-up and during the World Athletics Championships, Joey Scott was the head coach for Haiti.

== Results ==
Key

- Q = Qualified for the next round
- q = Qualified for the next round as a fastest loser or, in field events, by position without achieving the qualifying target
- NR = National record
- PB = Personal best
- SB = Season best
- N/A = Round not applicable for the event

=== Men ===
Cherubin competed in the heats of the men's 110 metres hurdles on 20 August in the fourth heat. There, he competed against eight other athletes and recorded a time of 13.56 seconds. He placed sixth in his round and qualified further to the semifinals after his time was within the four fastest not in the top four of any heat. In the semifinals held the next day, Cherubin competed in the second heat against eight other athletes. He recorded a time of 13.66 seconds and placed seventh, failing to advance for the finals.

Track and road events

Athlete	Event	Heat		Semifinal		Final	
Athlete	Event	Result	Rank	Result	Rank	Result	Rank
Yves Cherubin	110 metres hurdles	13.56 PB	6 q	13.66	7	Did not advance	
