= List of Wallis and Futunan records in athletics =

The following are the national records in athletics in Wallis and Futuna maintained by its local athletics federation: Wallis & Futuna Athletics Association (Ligue d'athlétisme de Wallis et Futuna).

== Outdoor ==
Key to tables: Awaiting ratification Record not kept by Wallis & Futuna Athletics Association Not ratified or later rescinded Wallis & Futuna Athletics Association

=== Men ===
Event	Record	Athlete	Date	Meet	Place	Ref.
100 m	11.05	Roger Lakalaka	1988		Valenciennes, France	
100 m	10.6 h	Jacques Pothin	31 August 1963	South Pacific Games	Suva, Fiji	
200 m	23.24	Utomanogi Tuikalepa	15 September 1996		Montpellier, France	
200 m	22.8 h	Jacques Pothin	8 October 1967		Nouméa, New Caledonia	
400 m	52.58^{†}	Nizié Feleu	17 September 1991	South Pacific Games	Port Moresby, Papua New Guinea	
400 m	50.6 h	Patita Fotutata	25 September 1985		Fiua, Wallis and Futuna	
800 m	2:00.7 h	Angélo Pétélo	31 August 1983		Nouméa, New Caledonia	
1500 m	4:08.1 h	Angélo Pétélo	22 August 1987		Sydney, Australia	
3000 m	9:36.3 h	Angélo Pétélo	13 August 1980		Nouméa, New Caledonia	
5000 m	15:49.8 h	Angélo Pétélo	7 November 1987		Nouméa, New Caledonia	
10,000 m	35:57.6 h	Sosefo Aikilikopi	30 August 1979	South Pacific Games	Suva, Fiji	
Half marathon	1:31:30	Pierre Doranges	6 September 2013	Pacific Mini Games	Mata-Utu, Wallis and Futuna	
Marathon						
110 m hurdles	15.09	Nizié Feleu	28 June 1992		Chassieu, France	
400 m hurdles	1:04.4 h	Nizié Feleu	11 May 1985		Nouméa, New Caledonia	
3000 m steeplechase	10:04.0 h	Angélo Pétélo	28 October 1987		Nouméa, New Caledonia	
High jump	1.96 m	Mameleto Tufele	25 July 1987		Fiua, Wallis and Futuna	
Pole vault	4.40 m	Nizié Feleu	14 May 1992		Dijon, France	
Long jump	7.19 m	Jacques Pothin	8 October 1967		Nouméa, New Caledonia	
Triple jump	13.79 m	Jacques Pothin	28 November 1965		Nouméa, New Caledonia	
Shot put	19.19 m	Akusitino Hoatau	2 July 2002		Mulhouse, France	
Discus throw	58.11 m	Akusitino Hoatau	5 July 2005		Bron, France	
Hammer throw	50.64 m	Akusitino Hoatau	8 June 2001		Mont-Dore, New Caledonia	
Javelin throw	80.34 m	Vitoli Tipotio	14 July 2002		Saint-Étienne, France	
Decathlon	6702 pts	Nizié Feleu	2 June 1990		Tours, France	
Decathlon	100m / Long jump / Shot put / High jump / 400m / 110m H / Discus / Pole vault / Javelin / 1500m					
20 km walk (road)						
50 km walk (road)						
4 × 100 m relay	46.47	Wallis and Futuna/Wallis and Futuna; Unai Bustillo; Claude Likuvalu; Petelo Sanele Masei; Jacky Joe Tuakoifenua	6 September 2013	Pacific Mini Games	Mata-Utu, Wallis and Futuna	
4 × 400 m relay
4 × 400 m relay	3:51.96	Wallis and Futuna; Victor Dabrion; Joel Luankon; Darren Pelo; Victorien Leakuasii	14 December 2017	Pacific Mini Games	Port Vila, Vanuatu	

^{†}: Result obtained during decathlon

=== Women ===
Event	Record	Athlete	Date	Meet	Place	Ref.
100 m	15.7 h	Anna Falevalu	12 August 1989		Hihifo, Tonga	
100 m	15.7 h	Neta Fenuafanote	26 March 1995		Kafika, Wallis and Futuna	
100 m	15.7 h	Sapeta Lakalaka	26 March 1995		Kafika, Wallis and Futuna	
200 m	30.2 h	Marie-Christin Sésleu	29 September 1981		Nouméa, New Caledonia	
400 m	1:12.0 h	Alice Toiava	12 August 1989		Hihifo, Tonga	
800 m						
1500 m	5:58.0 h	M. Sionépoé	18 October 1980		Nouméa, New Caledonia	
3000 m	17:26.0 h	Lorraine Caro	28 February 2009		Kafika, Wallis and Futuna	
5000 m	22:56.89	Françoise Ziegler	28 July 2008	Oceania Masters Championships	Townsville, Australia	
10,000 m						
Marathon						
100 m hurdles						
400 m hurdles						
3000 m steeplechase						
High jump	1.55 m	Koleti Salusa	8 October 1986		Kafika, Wallis and Futuna	
Pole vault						
Long jump	5.10 m	Epitania Kolokilagi	9 June 1985		Fiua, Wallis and Futuna	
Long jump	5.10 m	Valélio Timo	9 June 1985		Fiua, Wallis and Futuna	
Triple jump	11.60 m	Nicole Kiautua	5 June 1994		Rennes, France	
Shot put	15.01 m	Sélèma Sione	14 June 2002		Albi, France	
Discus throw	49.42 m	Marie-Christin Sésleu	27 June 1984		Montargis, France (Note: probably)	
Hammer throw	36.59 m	Sélèma Sione	22 June 2002		Bordeaux, France	
Javelin throw	56.41 m	Romina Ugatai	12 June 2011		Strasbourg, France	
Heptathlon	3242 pts	Marie-Christin Sésleu	30 August 1981		Nouméa, New Caledonia	
Heptathlon	100m H / High jump / Shot put / 200m / Long jump / Javelin / 800m					
20 km walk (road)						
4 × 100 m relay						
4 × 400 m relay						

== Indoor ==
=== Men ===
Event	Record	Athlete	Date	Meet	Place	Ref.
60 m						
200 m						
400 m						
800 m						
1500 m						
3000 m						
60 m hurdles						
High jump						
Pole vault						
Long jump						
Triple jump						
Shot put	18.16 m	Akusitino Hoatau	1 February 2003		Mondeville, France	
Heptathlon						
Heptathlon	60m / Long jump / Shot put / High jump / 60m H / Pole vault / 1000m					
5000 m walk						
4 × 400 m relay						

=== Women ===
Event	Record	Athlete	Date	Meet	Place	Ref.
60 m						
200 m						
400 m						
800 m						
1500 m						
3000 m						
60 m hurdles						
High jump						
Pole vault						
Long jump						
Triple jump						
Shot put	11.69 m	Romina Ugatei	14 January 2007		Paris, France	
Pentathlon						
Pentathlon	60m H / High jump / Shot put / Long jump / 800m					
3000 m walk						
4 × 400 m relay						
