= Stade de Mata Utu =

Sports venue in Wallis and Futuna

Coordinates: 13°16′46″S 176°11′11″W

Stade de Mata Utu, also Stade de Kafika is a multi-use stadium in Mata Utu, Wallis Island, Wallis and Futuna. It is currently used mostly for football matches. The stadium holds 1,500 people.
