= Fiua =

- Village
- Location in Futuna Island
- Coordinates: 14°15′11″S 178°10′49″W
- Country: France
- Territory: Wallis and Futuna
- Island: Futuna
- Chiefdom and District: Sigave

Population (2018)
  - Total: 257
- Time zone: UTC+12

Fiua is a village in Wallis and Futuna. It is located in Sigave District on the northwestern coast of Futuna Island. Its population according to the 2018 census was 257 people.
