= Haiti at the 2011 World Championships in Athletics =

- WA code: HAI
- National federation: Fédération Haïtienne d'Athlétisme Amateur

in Daegu
- Competitors: 3
- Medals: Gold 0 Silver 0 Bronze 0 Total 0

World Championships in Athletics appearances
- 1987; 1991; 1993; 1995; 1997; 1999; 2001; 2003; 2005; 2007; 2009; 2011; 2013; 2015; 2017; 2019; 2022; 2023

Haïti competed at the 2011 World Championships in Athletics from August 27 to September 4 in Daegu, South Korea. A team of 3 athletes was announced to represent the country in the event.

== Results ==
=== Men ===
Athlete	Event	Preliminaries		Heats		Semifinals		Final	
Athlete	Event	Time Width Height	Rank	Time Width Height	Rank	Time Width Height	Rank	Time Width Height	Rank
Roudy Monrose	200 metres			22.18	51	Did not advance			
Moise Joseph	800 metres			1:48.17	28	Did not advance			
Samyr Lainé	Triple jump	16.38	19					Did not advance	
