= List of Haitian records in athletics =

The following are the national records in athletics in Haiti maintained by its national athletics federation: Fédération Haïtienne d'Athlétisme Amateur (FHAA).

== Outdoor ==
Key to tables: Awaiting ratification Record not kept by FHAA Not ratified or later rescined by FHAA

=== Men ===
Event	Record	Athlete	Date	Meet	Place	Ref.
100 m	10.13 (+1.4 m/s)	Christopher Borzor	14 June 2025	Star Athletics Sprint Series	Winter Garden, Bahamas	
200 m	20.69 (−0.9 m/s)	Roudy Monrose	6 August 2011		Uniondale, United States	
400 m	46.34	Pascale Orelus	25 May 2012	NCAA Division I East Preliminary Round	Jacksonville, United States	
400 m	45.90	Elijah Wright	15 May 2022	The American Championships	Wichita, United States	
800 m	1:45.79	Jean-Marc Destiné	11 May 1996		Eagle Rock, United States	
1500 m	3:45.96	Moise Joseph	21 July 2009		Ghent, Belgium	
1500 m	3:45.54 (Note: as a US citizen)	Moise Joseph	12 May 2002		Starkville, United States	
3000 m	8:23.96	Mark Allen	20 February 2016	Embry Riddle Last Chance	Daytona Beach, United States	
5000 m	13:58.44	Mark Allen	15 April 2016	Mt. SAC Relays	Norwalk, United States	
10,000 m	29:18.03	Steeve Gabart	27 March 2009		Palo Alto, United States	
Marathon	2:14:22	Dieudonné Lamothe	16 April 1988		Gagny, France	
110 m hurdles	13.25 (−0.3 m/s)	Dudley Dorival	9 August 2001	World Championships	Edmonton, Canada	
300 m hurdles	36.18	Rene Fransua	1 April 2023	Felix Sánchez Classic	Santo Domingo, Dominican Republic	
400 m hurdles	49.99	Alié Beauvais	17 May 2009	IC4A Championship	Princeton, United States	
3000 m steeplechase	10:36.2	St. Joseph Anilis	5 August 1972		Lübeck, West Germany	
High jump	2.22 m	Jean Huguens	14 June 2003		Sacramento, United States	
Pole vault	4.70 m	Chandler Polyte	12 April 2014	Lee Calhoun Memorial Invitational	Macomb, United States	
Long jump	7.93 m	Sylvio Cator	9 September 1928		Paris, France	
Triple jump	17.39 m A (+1.3 m/s)	Samyr Lainé	24 July 2009		Bogotá, Colombia	
Shot put	18.84 m	Rickssen Opont	20 March 2021	Auburn Tiger Track Classic	Auburn, United States	
Shot put	19.17 m	Rickssen Opont	16 June 2022			
Discus throw	50.70 m	Rickssen Opont	1 May 2021	SLU Pre-Conference Tune Up	Hammond, United States	
Discus throw	51.22 m	Abel Gilet	30 April 2017	Big Red Outdoor Invitational	Ithaca, United States	
Discus throw	54.43 m	Abel Gilet	25 June 2016	Philadelphia USATF National Club Championships	Philadelphia, United States	
Hammer throw	61.19 m	Tony Auguste	23 April 2021	Charlotte Invitational	Charlotte, United States	
Hammer throw	61.57 m	Rickssen Opont	16 June 2022			
Javelin throw	58.97 m (Note: record set during decathlon competition)	Brian Donna	6 April 2018	The Sketcher's Performance Carl Kight Invitational	Nacogdoches, United States	
Decathlon	7128 pts	Josue Louis	12–13 April 2017	Mt. SAC Relays	Azusa, United States	
Decathlon	100m / Long jump / Shot put / High jump / 400m / 110m H / Discus / Pole vault / Javelin / 1500m; 11.23 (+1.2 m/s) / 6.93 m (+2.5 m/s) / 12.10 m / 2.05 m / 51.92 / 14.82 (NWI) / 39.00 m / 4.40 m / 51.97 m / 5:16.70					
20 km walk (road)						
50 km walk (road)						
4 × 100 m relay	40.43	Haiti; Gerald Clervil; Dudley Dorival; Wladimir Afriani; Wagner Marseille	20 August 2000		Nivelles, Belgium	
4 × 400 m relay						
Sprint medley relay (2,2,4,8)	3:23.74	Haiti; Robert Moise (200 m); Pierre Shnyden (200 m); Olivier McDaniel (400 m); Joseph Moise (800 m)	29 April 2017	Penn Relays	Philadelphia, United States	

=== Women ===
Event	Record	Athlete	Date	Meet	Place	Ref.
100 m	11.18 (+1.4 m/s)	Barbara Pierre (Note: Barbara Pierre transferred to USA from 25 March 2010)	21 May 2009		San Angelo, United States	
200 m	23.06 (−0.3 m/s)	Marlena Wesh	21 April 2012	ACC Championships	Charlottesville, United States	
400 m	51.23	Marlena Wesh	6 July 2012	NACAC Under-23 Championships	Irapuato, Mexico	
400 m	50.60 (Note: originally listed for Haiti, but Jonathas appears to have opted for the USA)	Wadeline Jonathas	8 June 2019	NCAA Division I Championships	Austin, United States	
400 m	50.23	Wadeline Venlogh	17 August 2025	NACAC Championships	Freeport, Bahamas	
400 m	49.91	Wadeline Venlogh	14 September 2025	World Championships	Tokyo, Japan	
800 m	2:04.26	Ginou Etienne	27 May 2006		Greensboro, United States	
1500 m	5:08.60	Dieunise Désir	11 April 2015	Hopkins Loyola Invitational	Baltimore, United States	
3000 m	13:27.3 h	Mathilde Saint-Hilaire	26–28 August 2005		Port-au-Prince, Haiti	
5000 m	22:34.28	Mathilde Saint-Hilaire	21 June 2008		San Salvador, El Salvador	
10,000 m						
10 km (road)	49:27+	Annie Lolagne	25 January 2009	Miami Marathon	Miami, United States	
Half marathon	1:44:14+	Annie Lolagne	25 January 2009	Miami Marathon	Miami, United States	
30 km (road)	2:31:16+	Annie Lolagne	25 January 2009	Miami Marathon	Miami, United States	
Marathon	3:34:42	Annie Lolagne	7 October 2012	Chicago Marathon	Chicago, United States	
100 m hurdles	12.74 (+1.7 m/s)	Nadine Faustin	23 August 2004	Olympic Games	Athens, Greece	
400 m hurdles	56.87	Jessica Gelibert	29 May 2014		Jacksonville, United States	
3000 m steeplechase	11:55.57	Dieunise Désir	3 May 2015	Capital Athletic Conference Championships	York, United States	
High jump	1.86 m	Vanessa Jules	22 May 2015		Chula Vista, United States	
Pole vault	2.00 m	Roselyne Plaisimond	8 May 2016		Versailles, France	
Long jump	6.05 m (+1.1 m/s)	Linda Louissant	14 May 2005		New Orleans, United States	
Triple jump	13.47 m A (−1.0 m/s)	Pascale Delauney	27 November 2014	CAC Games	Xalapa, Mexico	
Shot put	16.80 m	Debbie Saint-Phard	27 June 1988		Wickliffe, United States	
Discus throw	56.62 m	Dayana Octavien	21 March 2008		Tampa, United States	
Hammer throw	52.77 m	Ann Dagrin	28 April 2016		Philadelphia, United States	
Hammer throw	54.10 m	Ann Dagrin	16 May 2015	ECAC and IC4A Championships	Princeton, United States	
Javelin throw	37.14 m	Vanessa Jules	18 April 2015		Clarksville, United States	
Heptathlon	5723 pts	Vanessa Jules	23 May 2015		Chula Vista, United States	
Heptathlon	100m H / High jump / Shot put / 200m / Long jump / Javelin / 800m; 13.75 (?) / 1.86 m / 11.16 m / 24.92 (?) / 5.97 (?) / 30.50 m / 2:19.52					
20 km walk (road)						
50 km walk (road)						
4 × 100 m relay	46.38	Haiti; Nadine Faustin; Ginou Etienne; C. Roundtree; Barbara Pierre	22 June 2008		Port-au-Prince, Haiti	
4 × 400 m relay						

== Indoor ==
=== Men ===
Event	Record	Athlete	Date	Meet	Place	Ref.
50 m	6.04	Emmanuel Josselin	17 January 1999		Miramas, France	
55 m	6.42	Jonathan Juin	3 December 2010	Arkansas State Kickoff Klassic	Jonesboro, United States	
60 m	6.62	Darrell Wesh	19 February 2016	Virginia Tech Challenge	Blacksburg, United States	
60 m	6.60	Bryand Rincher	11 January 2018	Orange & Purple Elite	Clemson, United States	
200 m	21.13	Jonathan Juin	26 February 2011	SEC Championships	Fayetteville, United States	
200 m	21.09 A	Guinove Joanus	20 January 2023	TTU Red Raider Open	Lubbock, United States	
400 m	47.05	Steve Delice	8 March 2008		Allston, United States	
800 m	1:47.56	Moise Joseph	29 January 2006	BW-Bank Meeting	Karlsruhe, Germany	
800 m	1:46.75	Cebastian Gentil	11 February 2023	Tyson Invitational	Fayetteville, United States	
1500 m	3:45.93	Moise Joseph	22 January 2011	New Balance Games	New York City, United States	
3000 m	8:18.25	Steeve Gabart	28 February 2009	ACC Championships	Blacksburg, United States	
5000 m	14:29.37	Steeve Gabart	27 February 2009	ACC Championships	Blacksburg, United States	
60 m hurdles	7.55	Dudley Dorival	15 February 2001		Stockholm, Sweden	
High jump	2.17 m	Huguens Jean	9 March 2003		Boston, United States	
Pole vault	2.40 m	Albright Bellegarde	13 December 2015		Paris, France	
Long jump	7.38 m	Narc Narcisse	16 February 2008		Seattle, United States	
Long jump	7.53 m	Luxon Glor	8 December 2018	Marauders Track & Field Winter Festival	Bismarck, United States	
Triple jump	16.91 m	Samyr Lainé	27 February 2011	George Mason University Last Chance Track Meet	Fairfax, United States	
Shot put	17.43 m	Rickssen Opont	14 February 2020		Birmingham, United States	
Weight throw	18.86 m	Tony Auguste	8 February 2020	South Carolina Invitational	Columbia, United States	
Weight throw	18.86 m	Tony Auguste	21 February 2020	Virginia Tech Challenge	Blacksburg, United States	
Heptathlon						
Heptathlon	60m / Long jump / Shot put / High jump / 60m H / Pole vault / 1000m					
5000 m walk						
4 × 400 m relay						

=== Women ===
Event	Record	Athlete	Date	Meet	Place	Ref.
60 m	7.18	Barbara Pierre	29 January 2010	Penn State National	State College, United States	
200 m	23.47	Marlena Wesh	26 February 2011	ACC Championships	Blacksburg, United States	
300 m	38.09	Marlena Wesh	22 January 2011	Hokie Invitational	Blacksburg, United States	
400 m	52.21	Marlena Wesh	4 February 2012	New Balance Collegiate Invitational	New York City, United States	
400 m	51.07	Wadeline Venlogh	21 March 2026	World Championships	Toruń, Poland	
500 m	1:11.82	Marlena Wesh	13 January 2012	Virginia Tech Invitational	Blacksburg, United States	
800 m	2:12.42	Ginou Etienne	15 January 2006		Gainesville, United States	
1000 m	3:20.82	Dieunise Désir	29 January 2016	Muhlenberg College Invitational	Allentown, United States	
1500 m						
Mile	5:37.08	Dieunise Désir	6 February 2016	Frank Colden Invitational	Collegeville, United States	
3000 m						
5000 m	20:43.87	Dieunise Désir	6 December 2014	Bow-Tie Track Classic	Collegeville, United States	
60 m hurdles	7.99	Nadine Faustin	17 February 2006	PSD Bank Meeting	Düsseldorf, Germany	
High jump	1.78 m	Linda Louissaint	6 February 2005		Gainesville, United States	
Pole vault						
Long jump	5.80 m	Linda Louissaint	15 January 2005		Gainesville, United States	
Triple jump	12.62 m	Linda Louissaint	29 February 2004		Murfreesboro, United States	
Shot put	16.28 m	Debbie Saint-Phard	31 January 1987		Princeton, United States	
Weight throw	19.20 m	Ann Dagrin	8 December 2014		South Huntington, United States	
Pentathlon						
Pentathlon	60m H / High jump / Shot put / Long jump / 800m					
3000 m walk						
4 × 400 m relay						
