= Haiti at the 2009 World Championships in Athletics =

- WA code: HAI

in Berlin
- Competitors: 2 (both male)
- Medals: Gold 0 Silver 0 Bronze 0 Total 0

World Championships in Athletics appearances
- 1987; 1991; 1993; 1995; 1997; 1999; 2001; 2003; 2005; 2007; 2009; 2011; 2013; 2015; 2017; 2019; 2022; 2023; 2025

Haiti competed at the 2009 World Championships in Athletics in Berlin, Germany, which were held from 15 to 23 August 2009. The athlete delegation consisted of two competitors, middle-distance runner Moise Joseph and triple jumper Samyr Lainé. Joseph competed in the men's 800 metres and reached the semifinals while Lainé failed to advance past the qualification round of the men's triple jump.

== Background ==
The 2009 World Championships in Athletics were held at the Olympiastadion in Berlin, Germany. Under the auspices of the International Amateur Athletic Federation, this was the twelfth edition of the World Championships. It was held from 15 to 23 August 2009 and had 47 different events. Among the competing teams was Haiti. For this edition of the World Championships in Athletics, middle-distance runner Moise Joseph and triple jumper Samyr Lainé competed for the nation.

== Results ==
Track and road events

Joseph competed in the qualifying heats of the men's 800 metres on 20 August 2009 in the seventh heat against six other competitors. There, he recorded a time of 1:46.68 and placed fourth, qualifying for the next round as his time was fast enough despite being outside of the top three of his heat. In the semifinals held the following day, Joseph competed in the third semifinal against seven other competitors. There, he recorded a time of 1:45.87, setting a new season's best, and placed fifth, failing to advance to the finals.

Event	Athletes	Heats		Semifinal		Final	
Event	Athletes	Result	Rank	Result	Rank	Result	Rank
800 m	Moise Joseph	1:46.68	4	1:45.87 SB	5	did not advance	

Field and combined events

Lainé in the qualification round of the men's triple jump on 16 August 2009 in Group A against 21 other triple jumpers. There, he recorded no mark for his first attempt, 16.06 metres for his second, and his longest at 16.34 metres for his final attempt. Overall, he ranked 29th and did not qualify for the finals of the event.

Event	Athletes	Qualification		Final	
Event	Athletes	Result	Rank	Result	Rank
Triple jump	Samyr Lainé	16.34	29	did not advance	
