= Marlena Wesh =

Haitian-American sprinter (born 1991)

Personal information
- Full name: Marlena Hilari Wesh
- Born: February 16, 1991 (age 35) Virginia Beach, Virginia, United States
- Height: 5 ft 6 in (1.68 m)
- Weight: 140 lb (63.50 kg)

Sport
- Country: Haiti and United States
- Sport: Running
- Events: 200 m, 400 m
- Updated on December 29, 2014

Marlena Hilari Wesh (born February 16, 1991) is a Haitian-American sprinter who competed in the 2012 Summer Olympics for Haiti in the women's 200-meter and 400-meter sprints. She appeared on the twenty-sixth season of The Bachelor.

== Early life ==
Wesh was born on February 16, 1991, in Virginia Beach, Virginia. Both of her parents, Hernould and Margareth Wesh, were born and raised in Haiti and she is a dual citizen. She is one of five siblings, including fellow sprinter Darrell Wesh, and the only one to consider herself Haitian-American. She attended Landstown High School in Virginia Beach, where she was a track star, being named as the 2008-09 Gatorade Virginia Girls Track and Field Athlete of the Year and The Virginian-Pilot's 2009 Female Athlete of the Year. After graduating in 2009, she enrolled at the University of Oklahoma, where she was given a full scholarship, but she transferred and enrolled at Clemson University in South Carolina, where she majored in psychology.

== Athletic career ==
Wesh was approached by Haitian Olympic hurdler Nadine Faustin-Parker, who encouraged her to run for Haiti. She first competed at the Central American and Caribbean Championships in Puerto Rico in July 2011, coming in 8th place in the 400m and 13th place in the 200m. She won the 400-meter sprint for Clemson in April 2012 at the Atlantic Coast Conference (ACC) outdoor championships with a time of 51.43 seconds, which was a meet record and her 4th consecutive 400-meter ACC championship. It is a current American college record and 17th best in the world. This time made her eligible to compete in the Olympics for both Haiti and America.

She earned All-American designation in March 2012 in a Division I championship at Boise State University in Idaho. In early July 2012, just prior to the 2012 London Olympics, Wesh ran her personal best in the 400-meters with a time of 51.23, just 0.03 seconds behind the first-place finisher, at the 2012 North America, Central America and Caribbean Under-23 Championships in Mexico.

Four of the five athletes representing Haiti at the 2012 Olympics were not from Haiti. Wesh's brother Daren could also have run for Haiti in the 2012 Olympics but chose to try to make the American team. Wesh said, "I still feel Haitian even if I wasn't born there". On August 3, she achieved her goal of making it to the 400-meter semi-finals in the 2012 London Olympics, having come in third in her heat. On August 4, she failed to make it to the finals, placing 8th in her heat and 19th overall, with a time of 52.49.

== Later career ==
Wesh appeared on the twenty-sixth season of The Bachelor, competing to date Clayton Echard. She was eliminated on week 5. She works as a real estate agent in Miami, Florida, although she previously worked in corporate human resources.

== Personal bests ==
Event	Result	Venue	Date
Outdoor
100 m	11.70 s (wind: +0.7 m/s)	Coral Gables, United States	19 March 2011
200 m	23.06 s (wind: -0.3 m/s)	Charlottesville, United States	21 April 2012
400 m	51.23 s A, NR	Irapuato, Mexico	7 July 2012
400 m hurdles	57.49 s	Austin, United States	7 April 2011

== Achievements ==
Year	Competition	Venue	Position	Event	Notes
Representing Haiti
2011	Central American and Caribbean Championships	Mayagüez, Puerto Rico	13th (h)	200 m	24.08 (wind: -0.1 m/s)
2011	Central American and Caribbean Championships	Mayagüez, Puerto Rico	8th	400 m	54.49
2012	NACAC Under-23 Championships	Irapuato, Mexico	2nd	400 m	51.23 A
2012	Olympic Games	London, United Kingdom	8th (sf)	400 m	52.49
2014	Central American and Caribbean Games	Xalapa, Mexico	8th (h)	100m	12.80 A (wind: -0.4 m/s)
