= Christopher Borzor =

Haitian athlete (born 1999)

Personal information
- Nationality: Haitian
- Born: 11 April 1999 (age 27) Haiti
- Height: 6 ft (183 cm)
- Weight: 175 lb (79 kg)

Sport
- Sport: Athletics
- Event: Sprint

Achievements and titles
- Personal bests: 100m: 10.13 (2025) NR; 200m: 20.55 (2021)

Christopher Borzor (born 11 April 1999) is a Haitian sprinter. He holds the Haitian national record over 100 metres.

== Early and personal life ==
Borzor's family moved to the United States when he was six year-old. He grew up in Baldwin on Long Island, New York. He attended Uniondale High School and as a high school senior he finished fifth in both the 100 metres and 200 metres at the New York State Public High School Athletic Association Track and Field Championships. He then attended the University of Cincinnati, where he earned a degree in interdisciplinary studies, and the University of South Carolina to study for a master's degree in gerontology.

== Career ==
He broke the University of Cincinnati records for the 200 metres indoors (20.84s), and outdoor 200 metres (20.55s). He set a new national record for the 100 metres during the NACAC New Life Invitational at The Bahamas National Stadium in Nassau, Bahamas on June 15, 2024, running a time of 10.14 seconds.

Borzor represented Haiti at 2024 Paris Olympics in the 100 metres. He won his heat in the preliminary round, but did not proceed past the first round after placing fifth in his heat with a time of 10.28.

In September 2025, he progressed from the preliminary round to the heats in the 100 metres at the 2025 World Championships in Tokyo, Japan, without advancing to the semi-finals.
