= Haitian Amateur Athletic Federation =

Governing body for athletics in Haiti

- Sport: Athletics
- Jurisdiction: Federation
- Abbreviation: FHAA
- Founded: 1969
- Affiliation: IAAF
- Affiliation date: 1970
- Regional affiliation: NACAC
- Headquarters: Pétion-Ville
- President: Alain Jean Pierre
- Vice president: Dukerns Louis Joseph
- Secretary: Jean Maxime Auguste

Official website
- fhaa1.com
- (Haiti)

The Haitian Amateur Athletic Federation (French: Fédération Haïtienne d'Athlétisme Amateur, FHAA) is the governing body for the sport of athletics in Haïti. Current president is Alain Jean Pierre.

== History ==
FHAA was founded in 1969 and was affiliated to the IAAF in 1970.

== Affiliations ==
FHAA is the national member federation for Haïti in the following international organisations:

- International Association of Athletics Federations (IAAF)
- North American, Central American and Caribbean Athletic Association (NACAC)
- Association of Panamerican Athletics (APA)
- Central American and Caribbean Athletic Confederation (CACAC)

Moreover, it is part of the following national organisations:

- Haitian Olympic Committee (COH; Comité Olympique Haïtien)

== National records ==
FHAA maintains the Haitian records in athletics.
