= 2021 European Athletics U23 Championships – Women's 400 metres hurdles =

Women's 400 metres hurdles at the 2021 European Athletics U23 Championships
- Venue: Kadriorg Stadium, Tallinn
- Dates: 8–10 July
- Competitors: 37 from 19 nations
- Winning time: 54.28

Medalists
| gold medal | Emma Zapletalová | Slovakia |
| silver medal | Sara Gallego | Spain |
| bronze medal | Yasmin Giger | Switzerland |

The women's 400 metres hurdles event at the 2021 European Athletics U23 Championships was held in Tallinn, Estonia, at Kadriorg Stadium on 8, 9 and 10 July.

== Records ==
Prior to the competition, the records were as follows:

| European U23 record | Margarita Ponomaryova (URS) | 53.58 | Kyiv, Soviet Union | 22 June 1984 |
| Championship U23 record | Angela Moroșanu (ROU) | 54.50 | Debrecen, Hungary | 14 July 2007 |

== Results ==
=== Round 1 ===
Qualification rule: First 4 in each heat (Q) and the next 4 fastest (q) advance to the Semi-Finals.

| Rank | Heat | Name | Nationality | Time | Notes |
|---|---|---|---|---|---|
| 1 | 4 | Emma Zapletalová | Slovakia | 56.84 | Q |
| 2 | 1 | Yasmin Giger | Switzerland | 56.87 | Q |
| 3 | 4 | Nikoleta Jíchová | Czech Republic | 57.14 | Q, PB |
| 4 | 2 | Zoe Pollock | Great Britain | 57.17 | Q, PB |
| 5 | 5 | Viivi Lehikoinen | Finland | 57.45 | Q |
| 6 | 3 | Sara Gallego | Spain | 57.57 | Q |
| 7 | 3 | Shana Grebo | France | 57.71 | Q |
| 8 | 2 | Janka Molnár | Hungary | 57.76 | Q |
| 9 | 2 | Eline Claeys | Belgium | 57.92 | Q, SB |
| 10 | 4 | Alice Muraro | Italy | 58.04 | Q |
| 11 | 2 | Carla García | Spain | 58.05 | Q |
| 12 | 5 | Camille Seri | France | 58.06 | Q |
| 13 | 5 | Nina Hespel | Belgium | 58.18 | Q, PB |
| 14 | 1 | Barbora Veselá | Czech Republic | 58.18 | Q |
| 15 | 4 | Natalia Wosztyl | Poland | 58.22 | Q, SB |
| 16 | 5 | Daniela Fra | Spain | 58.35 | Q |
| 17 | 3 | Nea Mattila | Finland | 58.59 | Q |
| 18 | 3 | Anna Gryc | Poland | 58.94 | Q |
| 19 | 5 | Iulia Nicoleta Banaga | Romania | 58.97 | q, SB |
| 20 | 5 | Mariya Buryak | Ukraine | 58.98 | q |
| 21 | 4 | Lena Pressler | Austria | 59.03 | q |
| 22 | 2 | Viktoria Willhuber | Austria | 59.03 | q, PB |
| 23 | 3 | Alizée Rusca | Switzerland | 59.33 | |
| 24 | 1 | Sára Mátó | Hungary | 59.36 | Q |
| 25 | 3 | Kristýna Korelová | Czech Republic | 59.58 | |
| 26 | 1 | Fatoumata Binta Diallo | Portugal | 59.60 | Q |
| 26 | 5 | Lena Wernli | Switzerland | 59.60 | SB |
| 28 | 2 | Kaitesi Ertzgaard | Norway | 1:00.05 | PB |
| 29 | 1 | Frida Hämäläinen | Finland | 1:00.54 | |
| 30 | 1 | Hanne Arstein | Norway | 1:00.62 | SB |
| 31 | 2 | Tetyana Bezshyyko | Ukraine | 1:00.68 | |
| 32 | 4 | Marie Skjæggestad | Norway | 1:01.09 | |
| 33 | 3 | Rebeka Tóth | Hungary | 1:01.27 | |
| 34 | 1 | Beatrice Berti | San Marino | 1:02.03 | NR |
| 35 | 4 | Tetyana Bilik | Ukraine | 1:02.64 | |
| 36 | 3 | Marie-Charlotte Gastaud | Monaco | 1:04.94 | NR |
| | 1 | Melanie Böhm | Germany | DQ | TR22.6.2 |

=== Semifinals ===
Qualification rule: First 2 in each heat (Q) and the next 2 fastest (q) advance to the Final.

| Rank | Heat | Name | Nationality | Time | Notes |
|---|---|---|---|---|---|
| 1 | 1 | Yasmin Giger | Switzerland | 55.99 | Q, SB |
| 2 | 3 | Viivi Lehikoinen | Finland | 56.37 | Q |
| 3 | 1 | Sara Gallego | Spain | 56.46 | Q |
| 4 | 2 | Emma Zapletalová | Slovakia | 56.48 | Q |
| 5 | 2 | Shana Grebo | France | 56.67 | Q, PB |
| 6 | 1 | Janka Molnár | Hungary | 56.80 | q |
| 7 | 2 | Nikoleta Jíchová | Czech Republic | 56.82 | q, PB |
| 8 | 3 | Carla García | Spain | 56.89 | Q, PB |
| 9 | 3 | Camille Seri | France | 57.01 | PB |
| 10 | 1 | Nea Mattila | Finland | 57.41 | PB |
| 11 | 3 | Sára Mátó | Hungary | 57.70 | |
| 12 | 2 | Daniela Fra | Spain | 57.96 | |
| 13 | 1 | Eline Claeys | Belgium | 58.24 | |
| 14 | 1 | Natalia Wosztyl | Poland | 58.28 | |
| 15 | 3 | Zoe Pollock | Great Britain | 58.49 | |
| 16 | 3 | Barbora Veselá | Czech Republic | 58.59 | |
| 17 | 1 | Lena Pressler | Austria | 58.65 | |
| 18 | 3 | Mariya Buryak | Ukraine | 58.72 | SB |
| 19 | 2 | Alice Muraro | Italy | 58.80 | |
| 20 | 2 | Anna Gryc | Poland | 58.84 | |
| 21 | 1 | Fatoumata Binta Diallo | Portugal | 59.28 | PB |
| 22 | 3 | Iulia Nicoleta Banaga | Romania | 59.34 | |
| 23 | 2 | Viktoria Willhuber | Austria | 59.98 | |
| 24 | 2 | Nina Hespel | Belgium | 1:02.06 | |

=== Final ===
| Rank | Lane | Name | Nationality | Time | Notes |
|---|---|---|---|---|---|
| 1st place, gold medalist(s) | 5 | Emma Zapletalová | Slovakia | 54.28 | CR, NR |
| 2nd place, silver medalist(s) | 6 | Sara Gallego | Spain | 55.20 | NR |
| 3rd place, bronze medalist(s) | 3 | Yasmin Giger | Switzerland | 55.25 | NU23R |
| 4 | 4 | Viivi Lehikoinen | Finland | 55.42 | NU23R |
| 5 | 1 | Janka Molnár | Hungary | 56.63 | |
| 6 | 8 | Carla García | Spain | 56.90 | |
| 7 | 7 | Shana Grebo | France | 56.91 | |
| 8 | 2 | Nikoleta Jíchová | Czech Republic | 57.30 | |
