= 2022 World Athletics Championships – Women's 400 metres hurdles =

Women's 400 metres hurdles at the 2022 World Athletics Championships
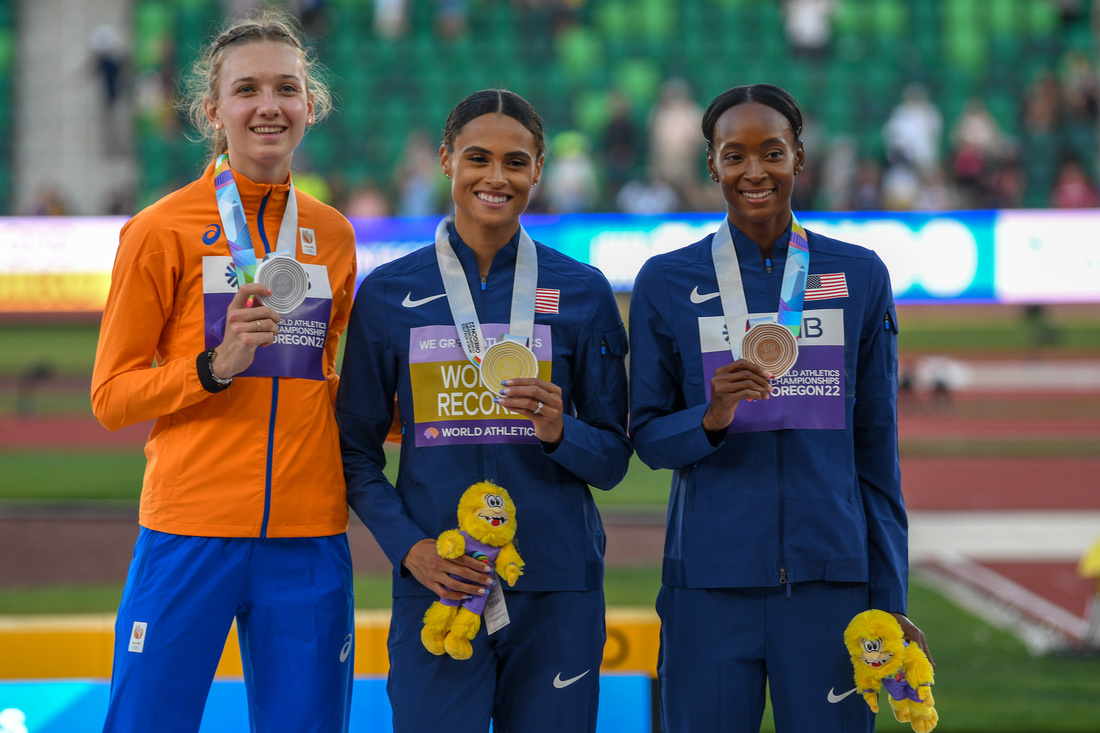
- Medalists Femke Bol, Sydney McLaughlin, and Dalilah Muhammad at the medal ceremony
- Venue: Hayward Field
- Location: Eugene, Oregon, United States
- Dates: 19 July 2022 (round 1); 20 July 2022 (semi-finals); 22 July 2022 (final)
- Competitors: 37 from 26 nations
- Winning time: 50.68 s WR

Medalists
gold medal	Sydney McLaughlin	United States
silver medal	Femke Bol	Netherlands
bronze medal	Dalilah Muhammad	United States

The women's 400 metres hurdles at the 2022 World Athletics Championships was held over three rounds at Hayward Field in Eugene, Oregon, United States, from 19 to 22 July 2022. It was the nineteenth time that this event was contested at the World Athletics Championships. Athletes could qualify by running the entry standard of 55.40 seconds or faster, by winning selected competitions, or by their position on the World Athletics Rankings.

Thirty-seven athletes from twenty-six nations competed in round 1, where twenty-four athletes advanced to the semi-finals. In the semi-finals, eight athletes advanced to the final, including Gianna Woodruff of Panama, who set a South American record of 53.69 s; Ayomide Folorunso of Italy and Viivi Lehikoinen of Finland set national records, but did not advance. The final was won by Sydney McLaughlin of the United States in a world record of 50.68 s, followed by Femke Bol of the Netherlands in second place in 52.27 s and Dalilah Muhammad of the United States in third place in 53.13 s.

McLaughlin's world record race was called "one of the greatest track performances of all time". At the time, it had the largest relative margin between a world record and the next-fastest athlete's time of any track event.

== Background ==
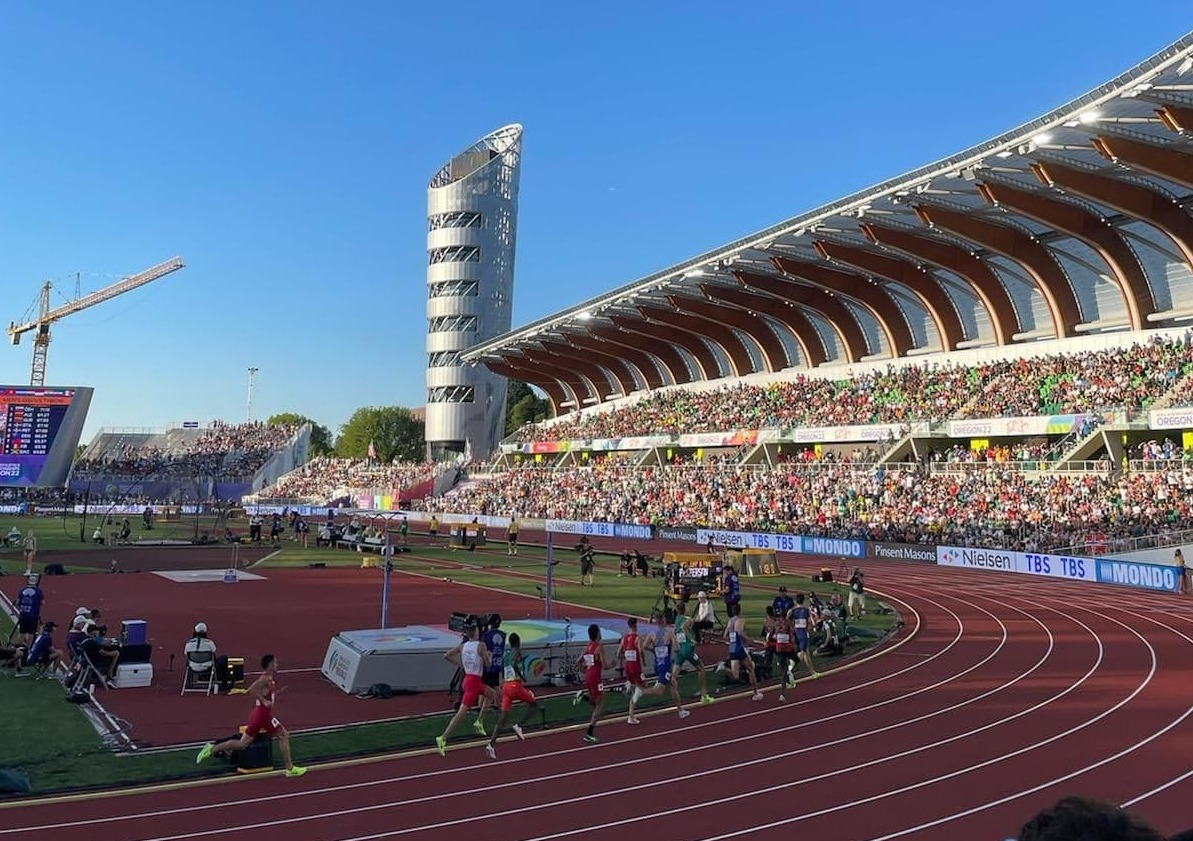
Hayward Field in July 2022

In the 400 metres hurdles, athletes run one lap on a 400-metre track while jumping over ten hurdles. The women's world championship in this event was introduced in 1980 and had been contested eighteen times at the World Athletics Championships before 2022.

Initially scheduled for 2021, these championships were postponed to 2022, following the postponement of the 2020 Summer Olympics to 2021, due to the COVID-19 pandemic. They were held at the University of Oregon's Hayward Field in Eugene, Oregon, United States, that had been renovated in 2018–2020.

At the start of these championships, Sydney McLaughlin held the world record of 51.41 s set at the 2022 USA Outdoor Track and Field Championships on 25 June 2022, which was the world leading performance of the 2022 season until then, and Dalilah Muhammad held the championship record of 52.16 s set at the 2019 World Athletics Championships on 4 October 2019 and was the defending champion.

Global records before the 2022 World Athletics Championships
Record	Athlete (nation)	Time	Location	Date
World record	Sydney McLaughlin (USA)	51.41	Eugene, United States	25 June 2022
World leading	Sydney McLaughlin (USA)	51.41	Eugene, United States	25 June 2022
Championship record	Dalilah Muhammad (USA)	52.16	Doha, Qatar	4 October 2019

Area records before the 2022 World Athletics Championships
Record	Athlete (nation)	Time	Location	Date
African record	Nezha Bidouane (MAR)	52.90	Seville, Spain	25 August 1999
Asian record	Han Qing (CHN)	53.96	Beijing, China	9 September 1993
Asian record	Song Yinglan (CHN)	53.96	Guangzhou, China	17 November 2001
European record	Femke Bol (NED)	52.03	Tokyo, Japan	4 August 2021
North, Central American and Caribbean record	Sydney McLaughlin (USA)	51.41 WR	Eugene, United States	25 June 2022
Oceanian record	Debbie Flintoff-King (AUS)	53.17	Seoul, South Korea	28 September 1988
South American record	Gianna Woodruff (PAN)	54.20	Eugene, United States	21 August 2021

== Qualification ==
For this event, forty athletes could qualify by running the entry standard of 55.40 s or faster between 28 June 2021 until 26 June 2022, by winning the area championship of their continent in 2020–2022, by wild card for the defending champion of 2019 or the Diamond League champion in 2021, and by their position on the World Athletics Rankings on 26 June 2022. Only one athlete per nation could qualify by wild card. A maximum of three athletes per nation could participate, or four in case of a wild card. A final entry list with forty athletes from twenty-six nations was issued on 7 July 2022.

== Results ==
=== Round 1 ===
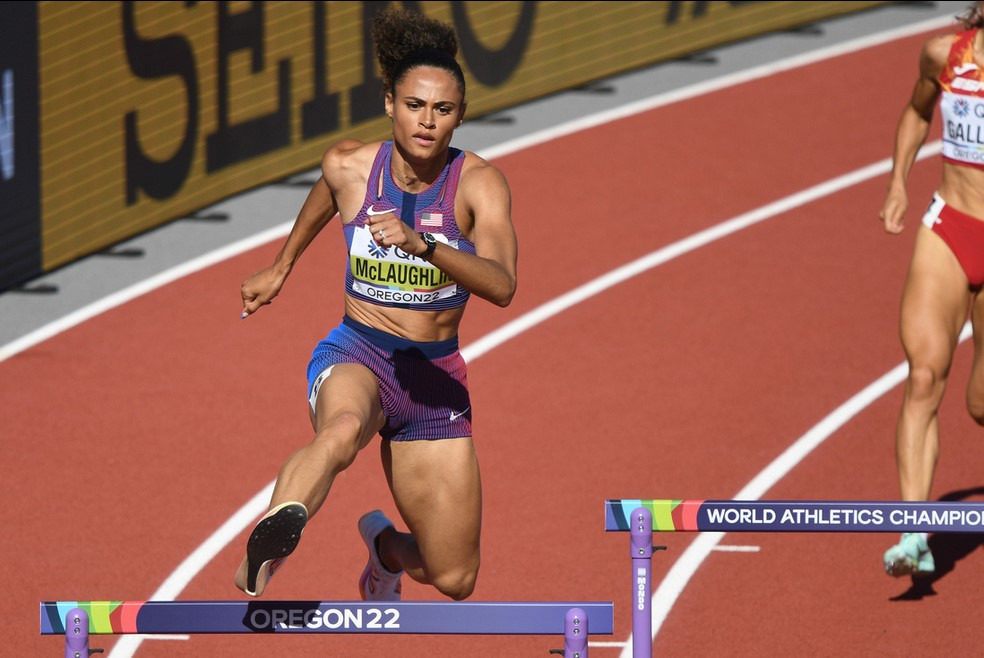
Sydney McLaughlin jumping over a hurdle in the first heat of round 1

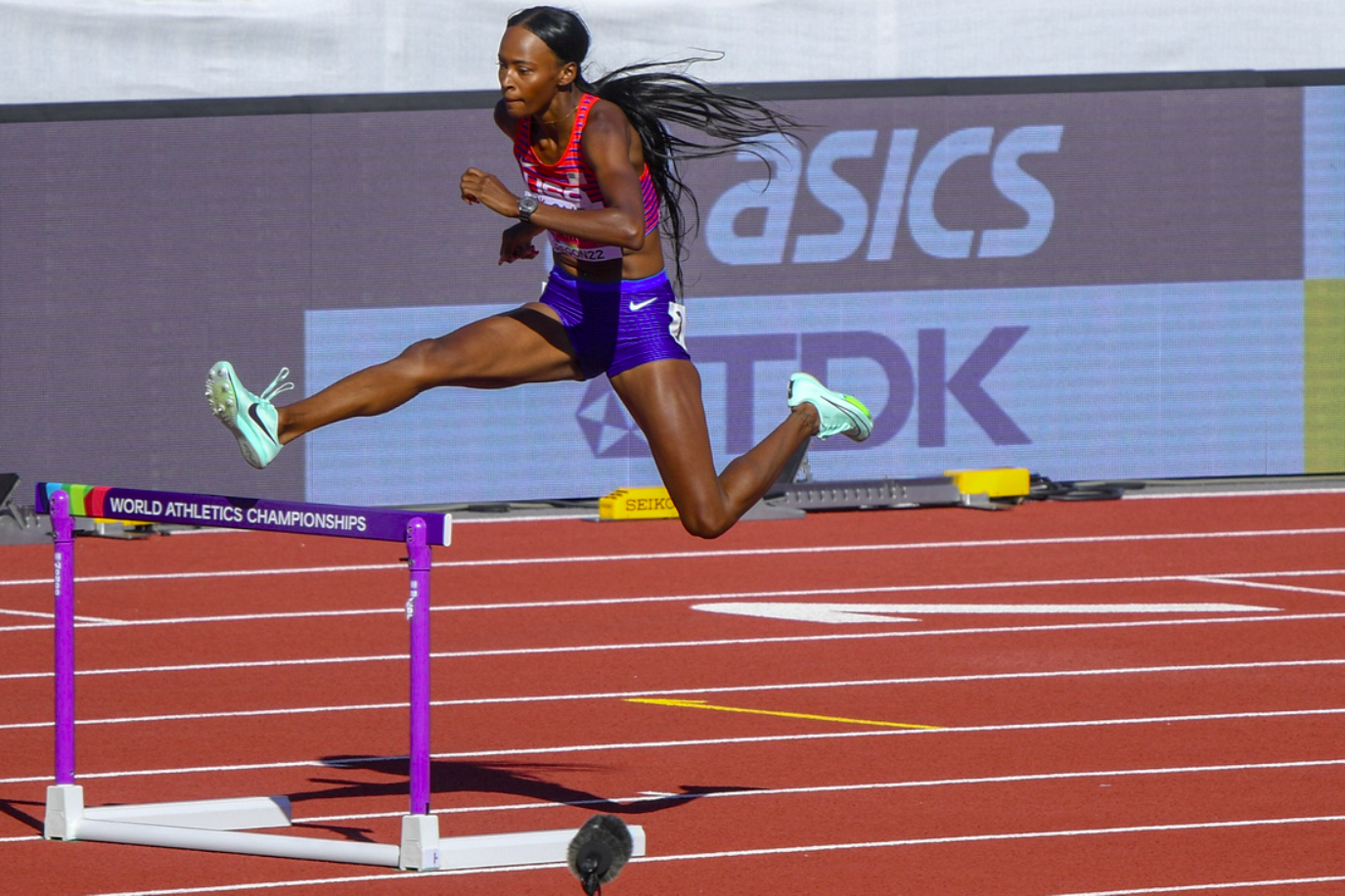
Dalilah Muhammad jumping over a hurdle in the fourth heat of round 1

Thirty-seven athletes from twenty-six nations competed in the five heats of round 1 on 19 July in the afternoon, starting at 17:15 (UTC−7). Twenty-four athletes advanced to the next round: the first four athletes in each heat (Q) and the next four fastest athletes overall (q) qualified for the semi-finals. In the third heat, Daniela Ledecká of Slovakia did not finish (DNF). In the fourth heat, Kristiina Halonen of Finland ran a personal best (PB) of 56.68 s, although she didn't advance to the next round. In the fifth heat, Amalie Iuel of Norway also ran a personal best (PB) of 54.70 s, which was fast enough to advance.

Results of round 1
Rank	Heat	Lane	Athlete	Nation	Time	Notes
1	3	8	Femke Bol	Netherlands	53.90	Q
2	1	8	Sydney McLaughlin	United States	53.95	Q
3	4	3	Dalilah Muhammad	United States	54.45	Q
4	2	5	Janieve Russell	Jamaica	54.52	Q
5	5	4	Britton Wilson	United States	54.54	Q
6	5	5	Ayomide Folorunso	Italy	54.69	Q
7	5	7	Amalie Iuel	Norway	54.70	Q, PB
8	2	8	Shamier Little	United States	54.77	Q
9	4	2	Shiann Salmon	Jamaica	54.91	Q
10	1	2	Anna Ryzhykova	Ukraine	54.93	Q
11	2	3	Viivi Lehikoinen	Finland	54.95	Q
12	5	2	Rushell Clayton	Jamaica	54.99	Q
13	3	7	Zenéy van der Walt	South Africa	55.05	Q
14	1	7	Sara Gallego	Spain	55.09	Q
15	3	6	Gianna Woodruff	Panama	55.21	Q
16	2	2	Viktoriya Tkachuk	Ukraine	55.27	Q
17	1	5	Paulien Couckuyt	Belgium	55.42	Q
18	3	2	Jessie Knight	Great Britain & N.I.	55.48	Q
19	3	4	Rebecca Sartori	Italy	55.72	q
20	2	7	Portia Bing	New Zealand	55.72	q
21	4	4	Sarah Carli	Australia	55.89	Q
22	1	6	Yasmin Giger	Switzerland	55.90	q, SB
23	2	6	Linda Olivieri	Italy	56.09	q
24	5	3	Carolina Krafzik	Germany	56.24	
25	4	5	Melissa Gonzalez	Colombia	56.24	Q
26	1	4	Grace Claxton	Puerto Rico	56.40	
27	5	6	Taylon Bieldt	South Africa	56.67	
28	4	6	Kristiina Halonen	Finland	56.68	PB
29	2	4	Aminat Jamal	Bahrain	56.78	SB
30	5	8	Vera Barbosa	Portugal	56.79	
31	4	1	Mo Jiadie	China	57.01	
32	4	7	Agata Zupin	Slovenia	57.12	
33	4	8	Lina Nielsen	Great Britain & N.I.	57.42	
34	2	1	Yanique Haye-Smith	Turks and Caicos Islands	57.99	
35	3	5	Quách Thị Lan	Vietnam	58.84	
36	1	3	Chayenne Da Silva	Brazil	59.46	
	3	3	Daniela Ledecká	Slovakia	DNF	

=== Semi-finals ===
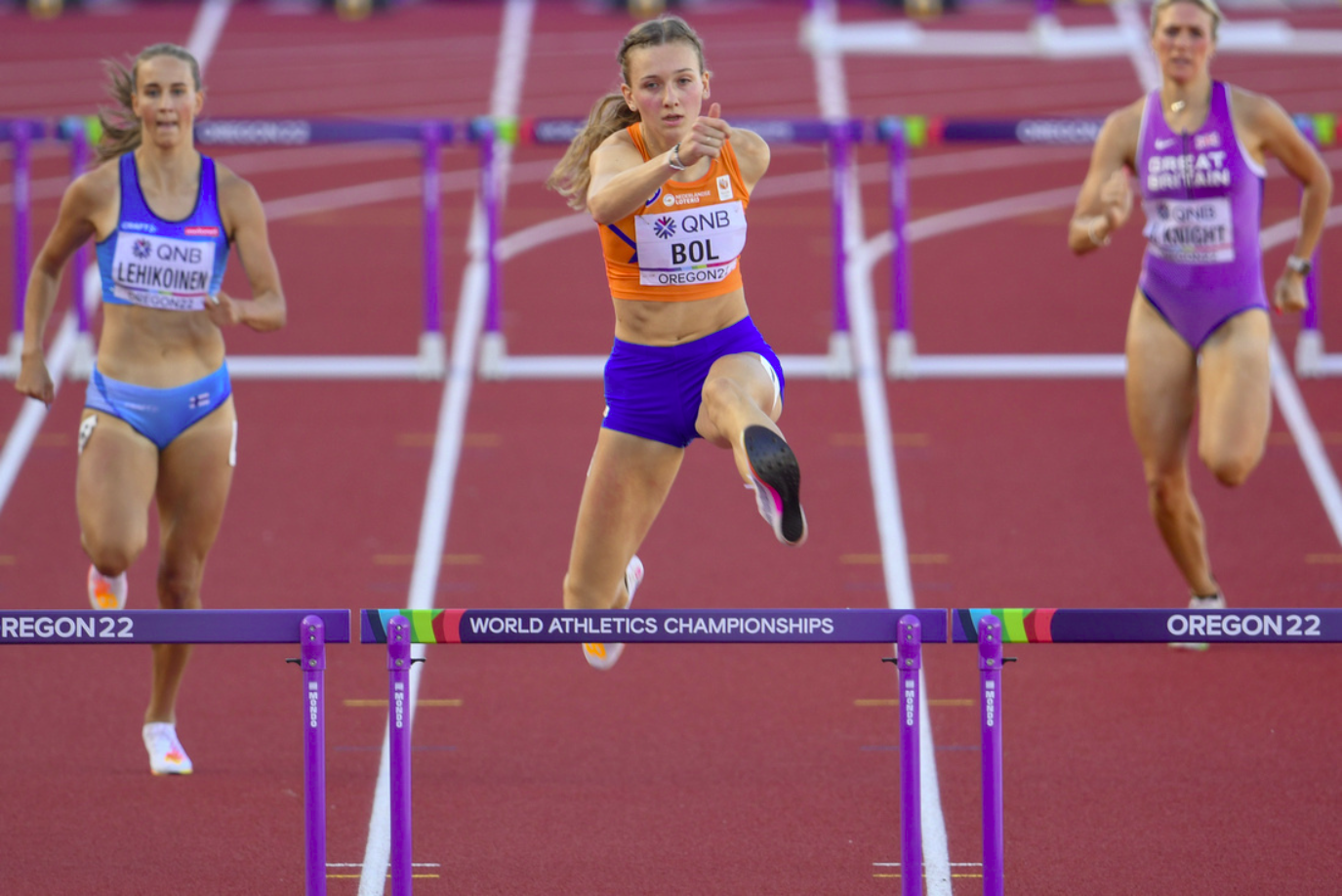
Viivi Lehikoinen, Femke Bol, and Jessie Knight in the second heat of the semi-finals

Twenty-four athletes of sixteen nations competed in the three heats of the semi-finals on 20 July in the evening, starting at 18:15 (UTC−7). Eight athletes, the first two athletes in each heat (Q) and the next two fastest athletes overall (q), qualified for the final. In the first heat, Zenéy van der Walt of South Africa set a personal best (PB) of 54.81 s, but did not advance. In the second heat, Rushell Clayton set a personal best (PB) of 53.63 s, which made her advance, and Viivi Lehikoinen of Finland set a national record (NR) of 54.60 s, which was not fast enough to advance. In the third heat, Gianna Woodruff of Panama set a South American record (AR) of 53.69 s, which made her advance, and Ayomide Folorunso of Italy set a national record (NR) of 54.34 s, which was not fast enough to advance.

Results of the semi-finals
Rank	Heat	Lane	Athlete	Nation	Time	Notes
1	3	6	Sydney McLaughlin	United States	52.17	Q
2	2	3	Femke Bol	Netherlands	52.84	Q
3	1	4	Dalilah Muhammad	United States	53.28	Q, SB
4	2	6	Shamier Little	United States	53.61	Q, SB
5	2	8	Rushell Clayton	Jamaica	53.63	q, PB
6	3	7	Gianna Woodruff	Panama	53.69	Q, AR
7	2	5	Britton Wilson	United States	53.72	q
8	3	3	Shiann Salmon	Jamaica	54.16	
9	3	8	Viktoriya Tkachuk	Ukraine	54.24	SB
10	3	5	Ayomide Folorunso	Italy	54.34	NR
11	2	7	Sara Gallego	Spain	54.49	
12	1	5	Anna Ryzhykova	Ukraine	54.51	Q
13	2	4	Viivi Lehikoinen	Finland	54.60	NR
14	1	6	Janieve Russell	Jamaica	54.66	
15	3	4	Amalie Iuel	Norway	54.81	
16	1	3	Zenéy van der Walt	South Africa	54.81	PB
17	3	1	Melissa Gonzalez	Colombia	55.13	
18	2	2	Jessie Knight	Great Britain & N.I.	55.39	
19	1	8	Paulien Couckuyt	Belgium	55.42	
20	1	1	Portia Bing	New Zealand	55.53	
21	1	7	Sarah Carli	Australia	55.57	SB
22	1	2	Rebecca Sartori	Italy	55.90	
23	2	1	Linda Olivieri	Italy	56.04	
24	3	2	Yasmin Giger	Switzerland	56.31	

=== Final ===
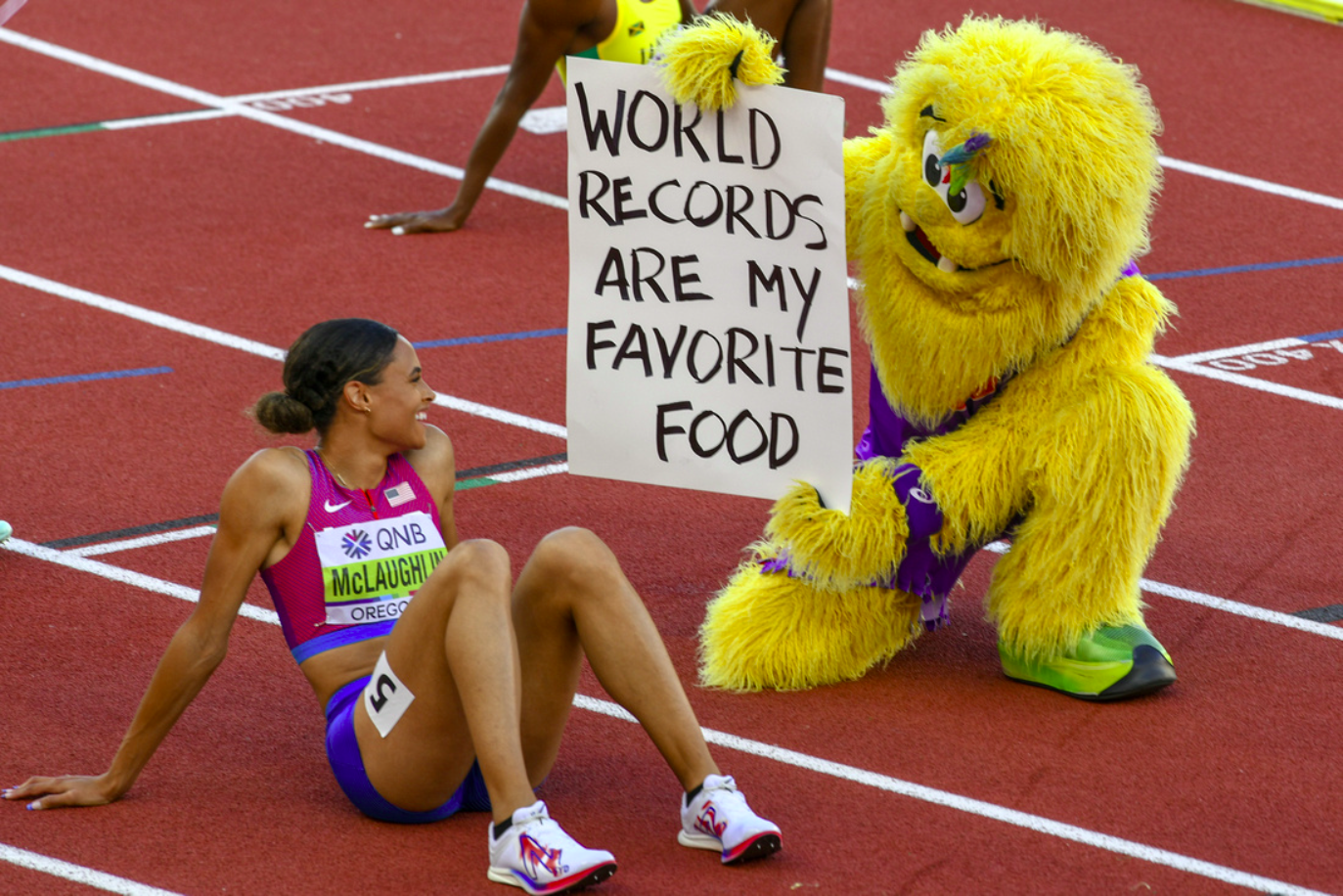
Sydney McLaughlin with Legend the Bigfoot, the championships mascot, after setting a world record in the final

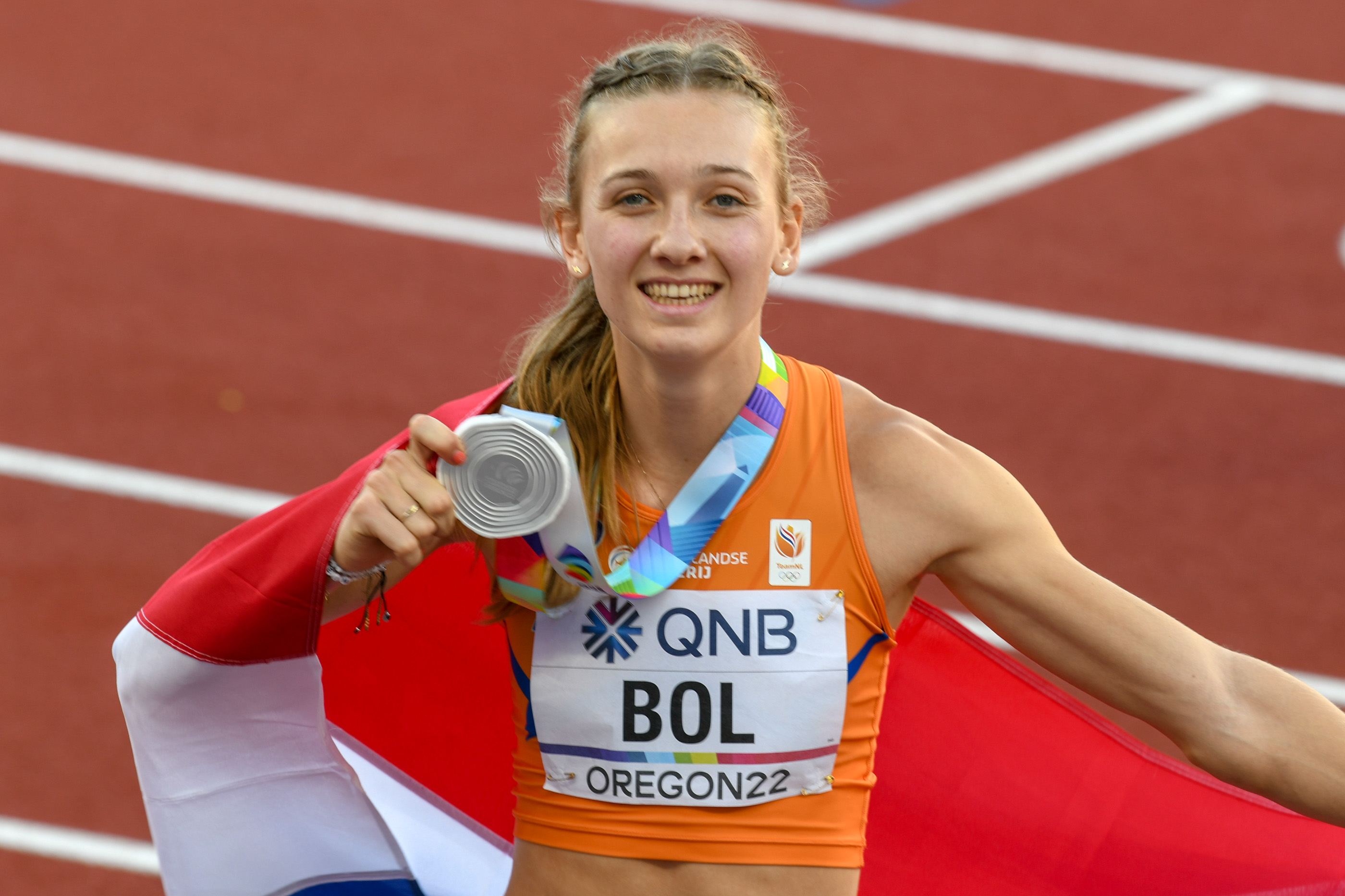
Femke Bol with her silver medal

Eight athletes from five nations competed in the final on 22 July in the evening, starting at 19:50 (UTC−7). After 100 metres, Sydney McLaughlin of the United States was ahead of the other runners, followed by Dalilah Muhammad of the United States and Femke Bol of the Netherlands. In the second 100 metres, McLaughlin continued to lead the race, while Bol had passed Muhammad. In the last 200 metres of the race, McLaughlin, Bol, and Muhammad kept hurdling in this order. McLaughlin won the race, improving her own world record (WR) with 0.73 s to 50.68 s, Bol finished in second place equalling her season's best performance (=SB) of 52.27 s and Muhammad finished in third place with a season's best performance (SB) of 53.13 s.

Scott Cacciola of The New York Times wrote that McLaughlin "broke the world record for the fourth time in two years, demolishing a deep and decorated field". Amy Tennery of Reuters said that McLaughlin "produced one of the greatest track performances of all time (...) by shattering her own 400 metres hurdles world record". Scott M. Reid of The Orange County Register thought that McLaughlin's performance was "worthy of the sport's ultimate compliment – Beamonesque". And Euan Crumley of Athletics Weekly wrote as a headline for his report of the final: "McLaughlin produces another moment of real magic". Jon Mulkeen of World Athletics calculated that the margin between McLaughlin's time and that of the next-fastest athlete of all time was 1.78%, the largest relative margin of all track world records at the time.

In an interview after the race, McLaughlin said: "The time is absolutely amazing and the sport is getting faster and faster. Just figuring out what barriers can be broken. I only get faster from here. I executed the race the way Bobby wanted me to. I knew coming home that if I just kept my cadence and stayed on stride pattern, we could do it and it happened." Bol said: "I ran against the best in the world, Sydney is just very strong. She was so far in front at the end, so I was always doubting if I really had a good race because it felt very good. Then I saw the time and I was like: 'Wow'. It is amazing to be a part of it and to come out second in such a race." Muhammad said: "I'm having mixed emotions, to be honest. It's great to get a medal but I came into these championships on the strength of having always gotten a medal at any championships, despite any injuries. But as a competitor, you always want more."

Results of the final
Rank	Lane	Athlete	Nation	Time	Notes
1st place, gold medalist(s)	5	Sydney McLaughlin	United States	50.68	WR
2nd place, silver medalist(s)	4	Femke Bol	Netherlands	52.27	=SB
3rd place, bronze medalist(s)	6	Dalilah Muhammad	United States	53.13	SB
4	3	Shamier Little	United States	53.76	
5	1	Britton Wilson	United States	54.02	
6	2	Rushell Clayton	Jamaica	54.36	
7	7	Gianna Woodruff	Panama	54.75	
8	8	Anna Ryzhykova	Ukraine	54.93	
