= 2018 IAAF World U20 Championships – Women's 400 metres hurdles =

Women's 400 metres hurdles at the 2018 World U20 Championships
- Venue: Ratina Stadium
- Dates: 11, 12 and 13 July
- Competitors: 46 from 31 nations
- Winning time: 55.34

Medalists
gold medal	Zenéy van der Walt	South Africa
silver medal	Shiann Salmon	Jamaica
bronze medal	Yasmin Giger	Switzerland

The women's 400 metres hurdles at the 2018 IAAF World U20 Championships was held at Ratina Stadium on 11, 12 and 13 July.

== Records ==
Standing records prior to the 2018 IAAF World U20 Championships in Athletics
World Junior Record	Sydney McLaughlin (USA)	53.60	Fayetteville, United States	27 April 2018
Championship Record	Lashinda Demus (USA)	54.70	Kingston, Jamaica	19 July 2002
World Junior Leading	Sydney McLaughlin (USA)	52.75	Knoxville, Tennessee, United States	13 May 2018

== Results ==
=== Heats ===
Qualification: First 3 of each heat (Q) and the 6 fastest times (q) qualified for the semifinals.

Rank	Heat	Name	Nationality	Time	Note
1	2	Zenéy van der Walt	South Africa	57.78	Q
2	3	Xahria Santiago	Canada	58.09	Q
3	5	Shiann Salmon	Jamaica	58.14	Q
4	4	Yasmin Giger	Switzerland	58.18	Q
5	3	Sara Gallego	Spain	58.27	Q
6	1	Brooke Jaworski	United States	58.42	Q
7	4	Emma Zapletalová	Slovakia	58.45	Q
8	1	Sanique Walker	Jamaica	58.45	Q
9	5	Natalia Wosztyl	Poland	58.46	Q
10	1	Sylvia Schulz	Germany	58.79	Q
11	5	Nea Mattila	Finland	58.82	Q, PB
12	6	Sára Mátó	Hungary	58.88	Q
13	6	Jurnee Woodward	United States	58.91	Q
14	3	Marlene Santos	Brazil	59.00	Q
15	2	Viivi Lehikoinen	Finland	59.10	Q
16	3	Iulia Nicoleta Banaga	Romania	59.10	q, SB
17	2	Moeka Sekimoto	Japan	59.16	Q, SB
18	2	Jarmillia Murphy-Knight	Australia	59.19	q, PB
19	4	Chayenne da Silva	Brazil	59.26	Q
20	4	Solveig Vråle	Norway	59.28	q
21	3	Valeria Cabezas	Colombia	59.52	q, PB
22	2	Rūta Okulič-Kazarinaitė	Lithuania	59.58	q, PB
23	6	Gabija Galvydytė	Lithuania	59.66	Q, SB
24	1	Maria Fernanda Matos	Dominican Republic	59.71	q
25	4	Lisa Sophie Hartmann	Germany	59.76	
26	3	Annamaria Leszczynska	Australia	59.94	
27	4	Noura Ennadi	Morocco	59.95	PB
28	1	Janka Molnár	Hungary	1:00.13	SB
29	6	Marie Skjæggestad	Norway	1:00.17	
30	2	Jiadie Mo	China	1:00.44	
31	5	Kasumi Yoshida	Japan	1:00.61	
32	5	Valiantsina Chymbar	Belarus	1:00.90	
33	6	Loubna Benhadja	Algeria	1:01.24	
34	4	Maryana Shostak	Ukraine	1:01.26	
35	6	Tianlu Lan	China	1:01.45	
36	1	Lucie Krupařová	Czech Republic	1:01.49	
37	4	Anna Polinari	Italy	1:01.59	
38	6	Rogail Joseph	South Africa	1:01.68	
39	1	Tjaša Želenzik	Slovenia	1:01.73	
40	1	Alina Sharkova	Authorised Neutral Athletes	1:02.20	
41	3	Tetyana Bezshyyko	Ukraine	1:02.35	
42	5	Megan Champoux	Canada	1:02.93	
43	3	Beatrice Berti	San Marino	1:03.19	NJR
44	6	Barbora Veselá	Czech Republic	1:03.44	
45	5	Jui-Hsuan Yang	Chinese Taipei	1:04.56	
	2	Piibe Kirke Aljas	Estonia	DNF	

=== Semifinals ===
Qualification: First 2 of each heat (Q) and the 2 fastest times (q) qualified for the final.

Rank	Heat	Name	Nationality	Time	Note
1	2	Shiann Salmon	Jamaica	56.29	Q
2	1	Zenéy van der Walt	South Africa	56.72	Q
3	1	Sara Gallego	Spain	57.18	Q, NJR
4	3	Emma Zapletalová	Slovakia	57.22	Q, NJR
5	2	Yasmin Giger	Switzerland	57.44	Q
6	3	Xahria Santiago	Canada	57.55	Q
7	3	Brooke Jaworski	United States	57.57	q, PB
8	2	Natalia Wosztyl	Poland	57.68	q, PB
9	1	Viivi Lehikoinen	Finland	57.70	SB
10	1	Maria Fernanda Matos	Dominican Republic	57.74	NJR
11	1	Sára Mátó	Hungary	57.83	NJR
12	2	Jurnee Woodward	United States	58.20	
13	3	Nea Mattila	Finland	58.26	PB
14	1	Iulia Nicoleta Banaga	Romania	58.59	PB
15	1	Sylvia Schulz	Germany	58.79	
16	1	Gabija Galvydytė	Lithuania	58.88	NJR
17	2	Solveig Vråle	Norway	58.96	
18	3	Chayenne da Silva	Brazil	59.19	
19	2	Moeka Sekimoto	Japan	59.48	
20	3	Jarmillia Murphy-Knight	Australia	59.69	
21	3	Rūta Okulič-Kazarinaitė	Lithuania	59.83	
22	2	Valeria Cabezas	Colombia	1:00.53	
23	2	Marlene Santos	Brazil	1:00.53	
24	3	Sanique Walker	Jamaica	DNS	

=== Final ===
Rank	Lane	Name	Nationality	Time	Note
1st place, gold medalist(s)	5	Zenéy van der Walt	South Africa	55.34	
2nd place, silver medalist(s)	4	Shiann Salmon	Jamaica	56.11	
3rd place, bronze medalist(s)	8	Yasmin Giger	Switzerland	56.98	SB
4	6	Sara Gallego	Spain	57.11	NJR
5	3	Emma Zapletalová	Slovakia	57.35	
6	2	Natalia Wosztyl	Poland	58.17	
7	1	Brooke Jaworski	United States	58.43	
8	7	Xahria Santiago	Canada	58.49	
