= Sara Gallego =

Spanish hurdler (born 2000)

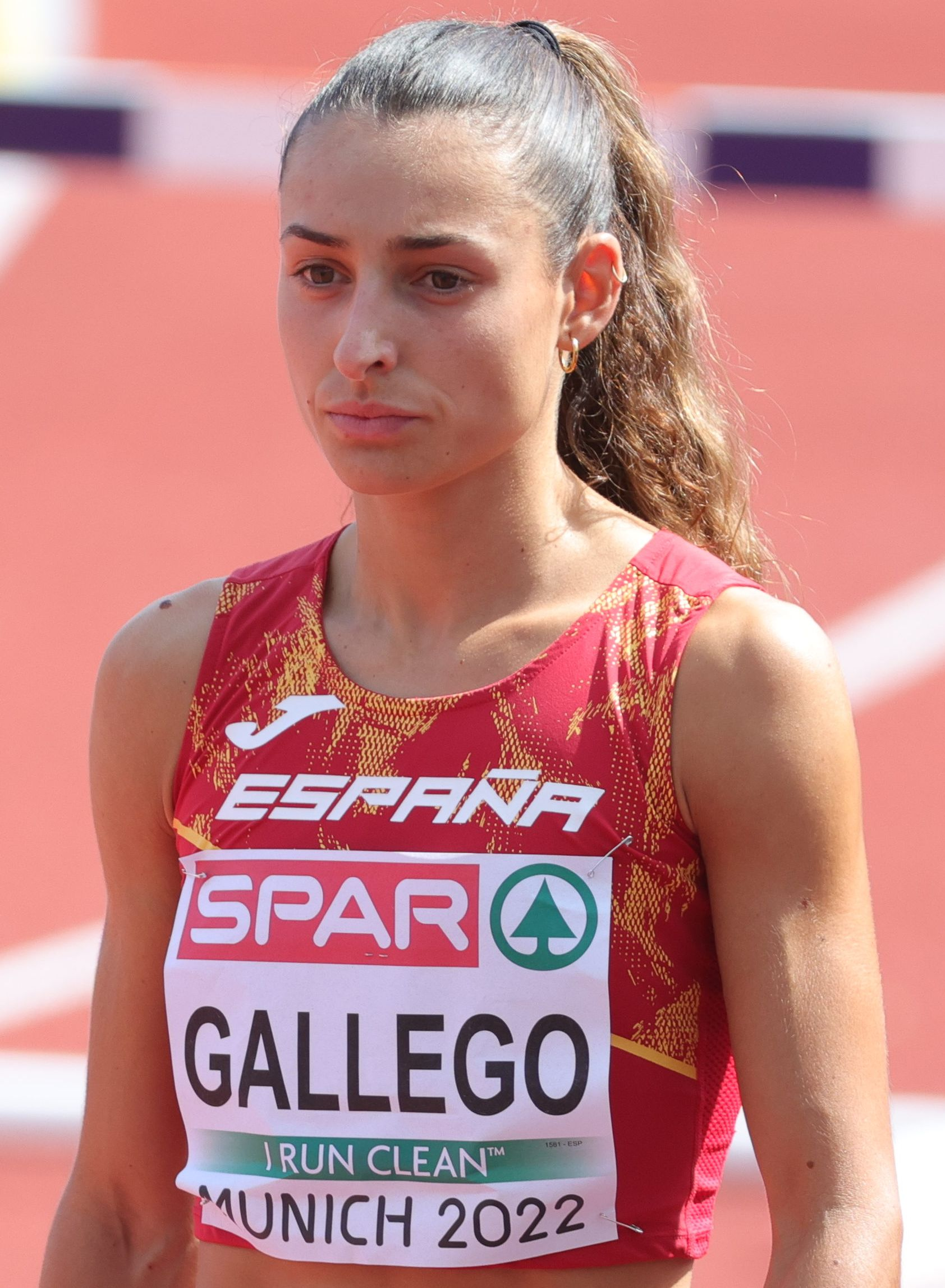
- Sara Gallego in 2022

Personal information
- Nationality: Spanish
- Born: Sara Gallego Sotelo; 11 October 2000 (age 25) Barcelona

Sport
- Sport: Track and field
- Event: 400 metres hurdles
Medal record
Women's athletics
Representing Spain
European U23 Championships
Silver medal – second place	2021 Tallinn	400 m hurdles
European U20 Championships
Bronze medal – third place	2019 Borås	400 m hurdles
European Youth Championships
Bronze medal – third place	2016 Tbilisi	400 m hurdles

Sara Gallego Sotelo (born 11 October 2000) is a Spanish athlete. She is the Spanish national record holder over 400 metres hurdles. In 2021, Gallego ran 55.20 to win silver at the 2021 European Athletics U23 Championships in Tallinn. In doing so, Gallego broke the national record held previously by Cristina Pérez and set 33 years previously.

== Biography ==
Gallego began competing as a teenager for Hospitalet Athletics club in Catalonia. She was a bronze medalist in the 400 metres hurdles at the 2016 European Athletics U18 Championships in Tbilisi. She finished fourth in the 400 metres hurdles at the 2018 World Athletics U20 Championships in Tampere. She was a bronze medalist in the 400m hurdles at the 2019 European Athletics U20 Championships in Boras, Sweden.

In September 2020, she broke the Spanish national record for 300 metres hurdles, running 40.18 seconds in Barcelona. She was a silver medalist in the 400m hurdles at the 2021 European Athletics U23 Championships in Tallinn.

She was a member of the Spanish mixed 4 × 400 m relay team, alongside Iñaki Cañal, Aauri Bokesa and Bernat Erta, which set a national indoor record time of 3:18.90 on 5 February 2022 at the Dynamic New Athletics Indoor Match in Glasgow, Scotland.

In May 2022, Gallego set a new national record time for the 400 metres hurdles of 54.87 in Alicante. Two weeks after that, at the Spanish Championship, Gallego lowered her own national record again with a run of 54.34. She won the Spanish Athletics Championships in 2022.

At the 2022 IAAF World Championship in Eugene, Oregon, Gallego qualified for the semi-finals with a run of 55.09. Gallego did not reach the final but only ran 15 hundredth's of a second outside her personal best as she finished behind Femke Bol and Britton Wilson.

She qualified did the final of the 400m hurdles at the 2022 European Athletics Championships in Munich, Germany in August 2022. In the final she ran 54.97 seconds to place fourth overall.

She suffered an injured at the beginning of 2023 which ruled her out of action for a period. She was runner-up to Daniela Fra at the Spanish Athletics Championships in June 2024.

Competing at the 2026 European Athletics Championships in Birmingham, England, she was a semi-finalist in the 400 metres hurdles.

== Personal life ==
She was born in Barcelona. She signed a sponsored agreement with Nike when she was a teenager. She studied business administration and management.

== International competitions ==
Year	Competition	Venue	Position	Event	Notes
Representing Spain
2016	European Youth Championships	Tbilisi, Georgia	3rd	400 m hurdles	58.73
2018	World U20 Championships	Tampere, Finland	4th	400 m hurdles	57.11
2018	European Championships	Berlin, Germany	19th (sf)	400 m hurdles	57.25
2019	European U20 Championships	Borås, Sweden	3rd	400 m hurdles	57.44
2021	World Relays	Chorzów, Poland	10th (h)	4 × 400 m relay	3:34.92
2021	European U23 Championships	Tallinn, Estonia	2nd	400 m hurdles	55.20
2021	European U23 Championships	Tallinn, Estonia	7th	4 × 400 m relay	3:33.54
2022	World Indoor Championships	Belgrade, Serbia	22nd (h)	400 m	53.13
2022	Ibero-American Championships	La Nucía, Spain	2nd	400 m hurdles	55.56
2022	Ibero-American Championships	La Nucía, Spain	1st	4 × 400 m relay	3:31.72
2022	World Championships	Eugene, United States	11th (sf)	400 m hurdles	54.49
2022	World Championships	Eugene, United States	11th (h)	Mixed 4 × 400 m relay	3:16.14
2022	European Championships	Munich, Germany	4th	400 m hurdles	54.97
2022	European Championships	Munich, Germany	8th	4 × 400 m relay	3:29.70
2026	European Championships	Birmingham, United Kingdom	15th (sf)	400 m hurdles	55.24
