= Viktoriya Tkachuk =

Ukrainian hurdler (born 1994)

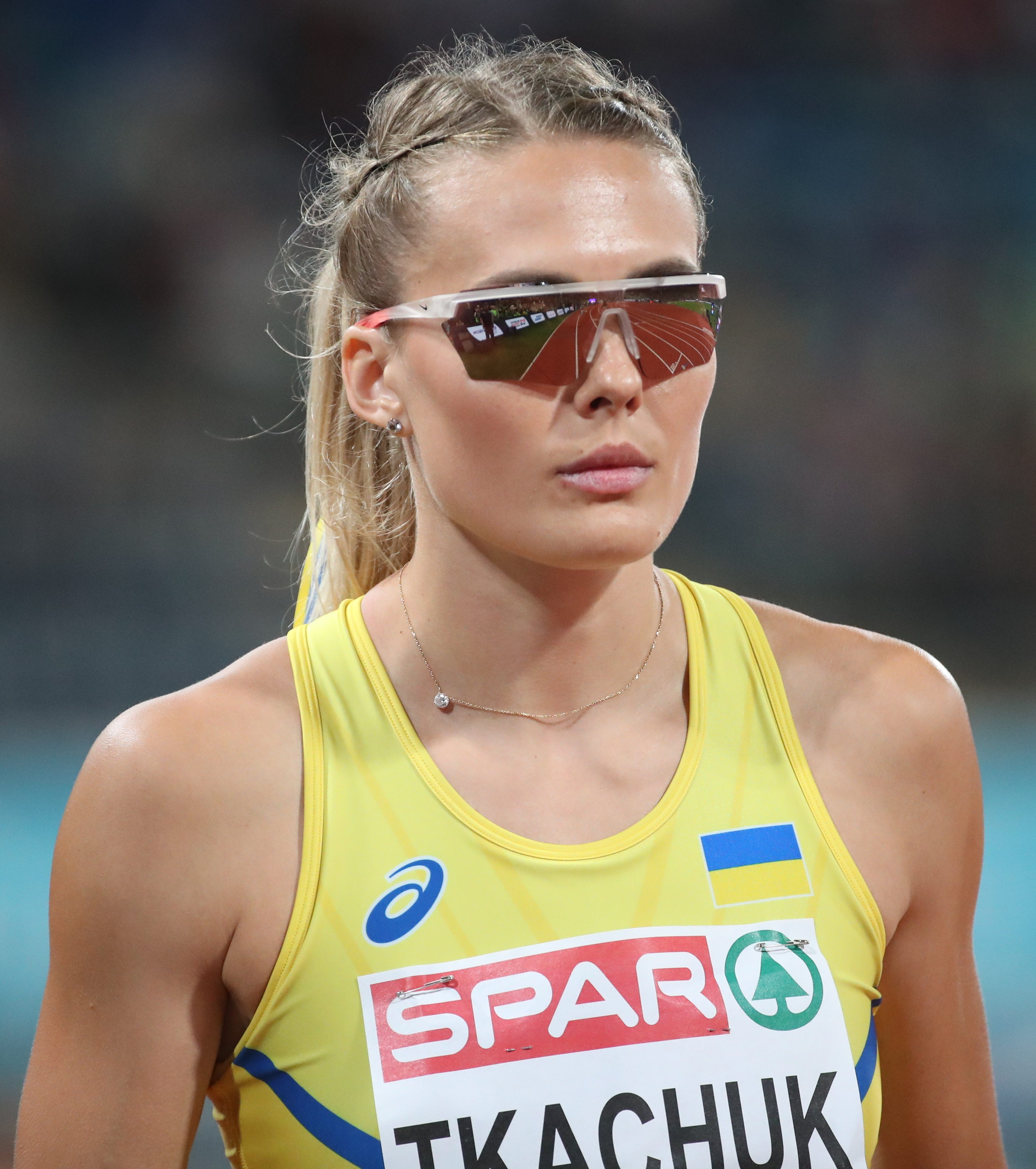
- Tkachuk in 2022

Personal information
- Born: 8 November 1994 (age 31) Plishchyn, Khmelnytskyi Oblast, Ukraine
- Height: 1.78 m (5 ft 10 in)
- Weight: 67 kg (148 lb)

Sport
- Sport: Track and field
- Event: 400 metres hurdles
- Coached by: Laurent Meuwly
Medal record
Women's athletics
Representing Ukraine
European Team Championships
Bronze medal – third place	2015 Cheboksary	4x400 m relay
European Championships
Silver medal – second place	2022 Munich	400 m hurdles

Viktoriya Viktorivna Tkachuk (Ukrainian: Вікторія Вікторівна Ткачук; born 8 November 1994) is a Ukrainian athlete specialising in the 400 metres hurdles. She won the silver medal in the event at the 2022 European Athletics Championships.

Tkachuk represented Ukraine at the 2016 Rio Olympics without advancing from the semi-finals, and at the 2020 Tokyo Olympics, where she placed sixth in the final.

Her personal best in the 400 metres hurdles is 53.76 seconds, set in 2021 in Zürich.

== International competitions ==
Representing Ukraine
Year	Competition	Venue	Position	Event	Notes
2012	World Junior Championships	Barcelona, Spain	23rd (sf)	400 m	55.02
2012	World Junior Championships	Barcelona, Spain	4th	4 × 400 m relay	3:37.02
2013	European Junior Championships	Rieti, Italy	21st (h)	400 m	55.35
2015	European U23 Championships	Tallinn, Estonia	9th (sf)	400 m hurdles	57.30
2015	European U23 Championships	Tallinn, Estonia	5th	4 × 400 m relay	3:32.86
2015	World Championships	Beijing, China	29th (h)	400 m hurdles	57.38
2016	European Championships	Amsterdam, Netherlands	9th (sf)	400 m hurdles	56.17
2016	Olympic Games	Rio de Janeiro, Brazil	22nd (sf)	400 m hurdles	56.87
2017	World Championships	London, United Kingdom	30th (h)	400 m hurdles	57.05
2018	European Championships	Berlin, Germany	7th	400 m hurdles	56.15
2021	Olympic Games	Tokyo, Japan	6th	400 m hurdles	53.79
2021	Olympic Games	Tokyo, Japan	9th (h)	4 × 400 m relay	3:24.50
2022	World Championships	Eugene, United States	9th (sf)	400 m hurdles	54.24
2022	World Championships	Eugene, United States	9th (h)	4 × 400 m relay	3:29.25
2022	European Championships	Munich, Germany	2nd	400 m hurdles	54.30
2023	World Championships	Budapest, Hungary	19th (sf)	400 m hurdles	55.43
2024	Olympic Games	Paris, France	21st (rep)	400 m hurdles	59.40
2026	European Championships	Birmingham, United Kingdom	12th (sf)	400 m hurdles	54.95
