= Emma Zapletalová =

Slovak athlete (born 2000)

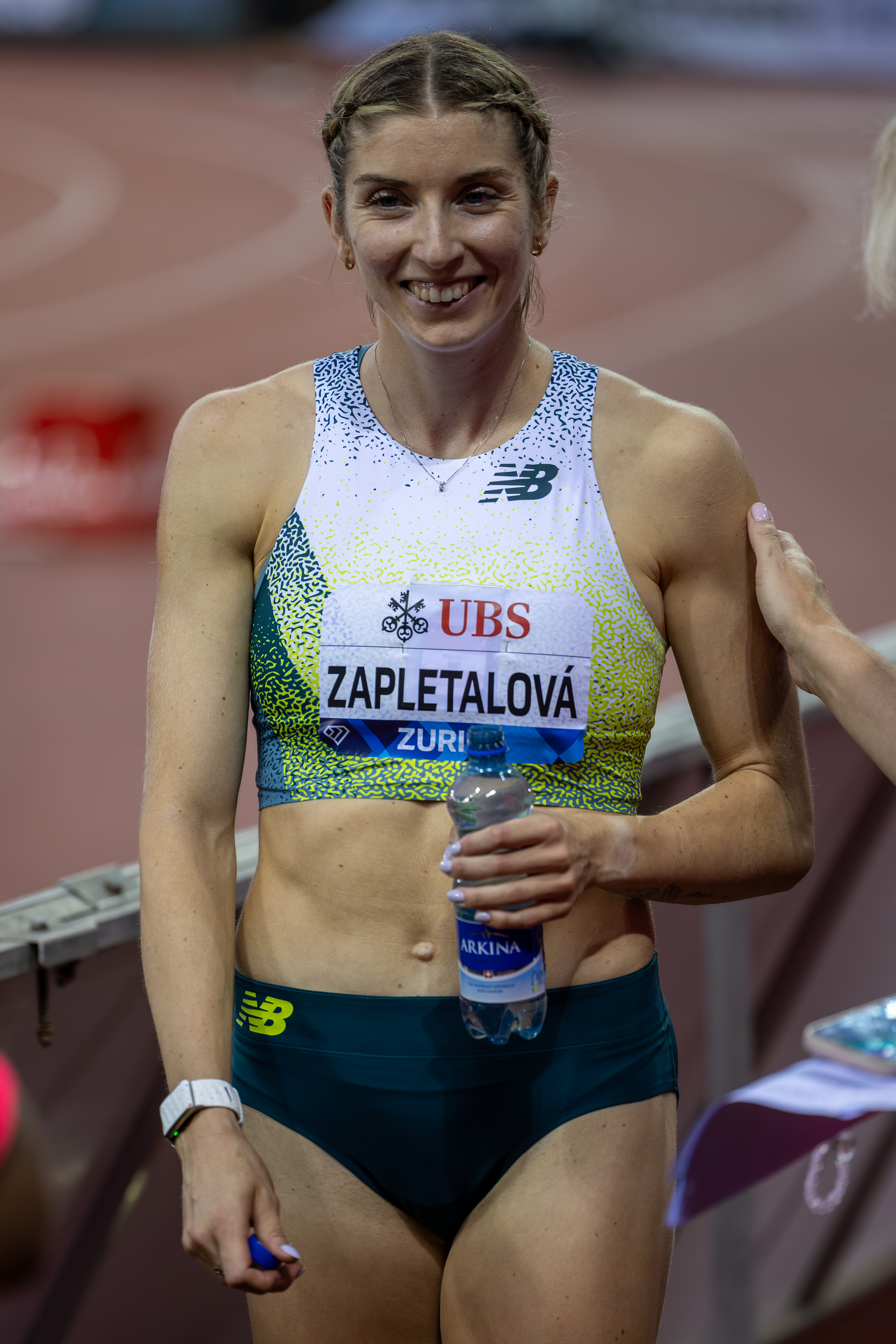
- Emma Zapletalová in 2026.

Personal information
- Born: 24 March 2000 (age 26) Nitra, Slovakia
- Height: 1.77 m (5 ft 10 in)
- Weight: 63 kg (139 lb)

Sport
- Country: Slovakia
- Sport: Athletics
- Events: 400 m hurdles, 400 m
- Club: ŠK Dukla Banská Bystrica - VŠC Dukla Banská Bystrica
- Coached by: Bram Peters; Peter Žňava (until 2024)

Achievements and titles
- World finals: 2025 Tokyo; 400 m hurdles, Bronze
- Highest world ranking: No. 1 (400 mH, 2026); No. 12 (overall, 2026)
- Personal bests: 400 m hurdles: 52.30 NR (Doha 2026); 400 m: 50.59 NR (Ostrava 2026); 200 m: 22.67 NR (Banská Bystrica 2026)
Medal record
Women's athletics
Representing Slovakia
World Championships
Bronze medal – third place	2025 Tokyo	400 m hurdles
World Ultimate Championship
Second place	2026 Budapest	400 m hurdles
European Championships
Gold medal – first place	2026 Birmingham	400 m hurdles
Diamond League Final
Silver medal – second place	2025 Zurich	400 m hurdles
Silver medal – second place	2026 Brussels	400 m hurdles
European U23 Championships
Gold medal – first place	2021 Tallinn	400 m hurdles

Emma Zapletalová (born 24 March 2000) is a Slovak athlete who specializes in 400 metres hurdles and 400 metres, holding the Slovak national record in both events. She is the current European Champion in the 400 metres hurdles. She won the bronze medal in the same discipline at the 2025 World Championships in Tokyo and finished second at the 2026 World Athletics Ultimate Championship in Budapest. Previously, Zapletalová held the European U23 Champion title.

== Early life ==
Emma Zapletalová was born on 24 March 2000 in Nitra. She grew up playing handball alongside athletics but decided to prioritize athletics at the age of 14.

== Career ==
=== Early career ===
On 15 July 2018 in Tampere, Zapletalová took fifth place in the 400 m hurdles at the World U20 Championships. Afterwards, she had to interrupt her career for several months due to mononucleosis and a stress fracture to her foot. On 2 August 2020, she ran the 400 m hurdles in Budapest in a time of 56.19 seconds, improving her personal best by almost seven tenths and breaking the previous Slovak record. On 30 August in Trnava, Zapletalová improved by exactly one second, setting a new national record of 55.19 seconds.

=== 2021: Olympic Games debut ===
In June 2021, at the FBK Games in Hengelo, Netherlands, she qualified by time for the delayed 2020 Tokyo Olympics in the 400 m hurdles, running 55.29 seconds. Zapletalová took almost one second off her previous national record to win the gold medal at the European U23 Championships in July, running a time of 54.28 seconds. She was a semi-finalist in the 400 m hurdles at the delayed 2020 Olympic Games held in August 2021, and was named Slovak Athlete of the Year 2021.

She competed at the 2022 European Athletics Championships in Munich, Germany in the women's 400 metres hurdles.

=== 2025: World Championships medalist ===
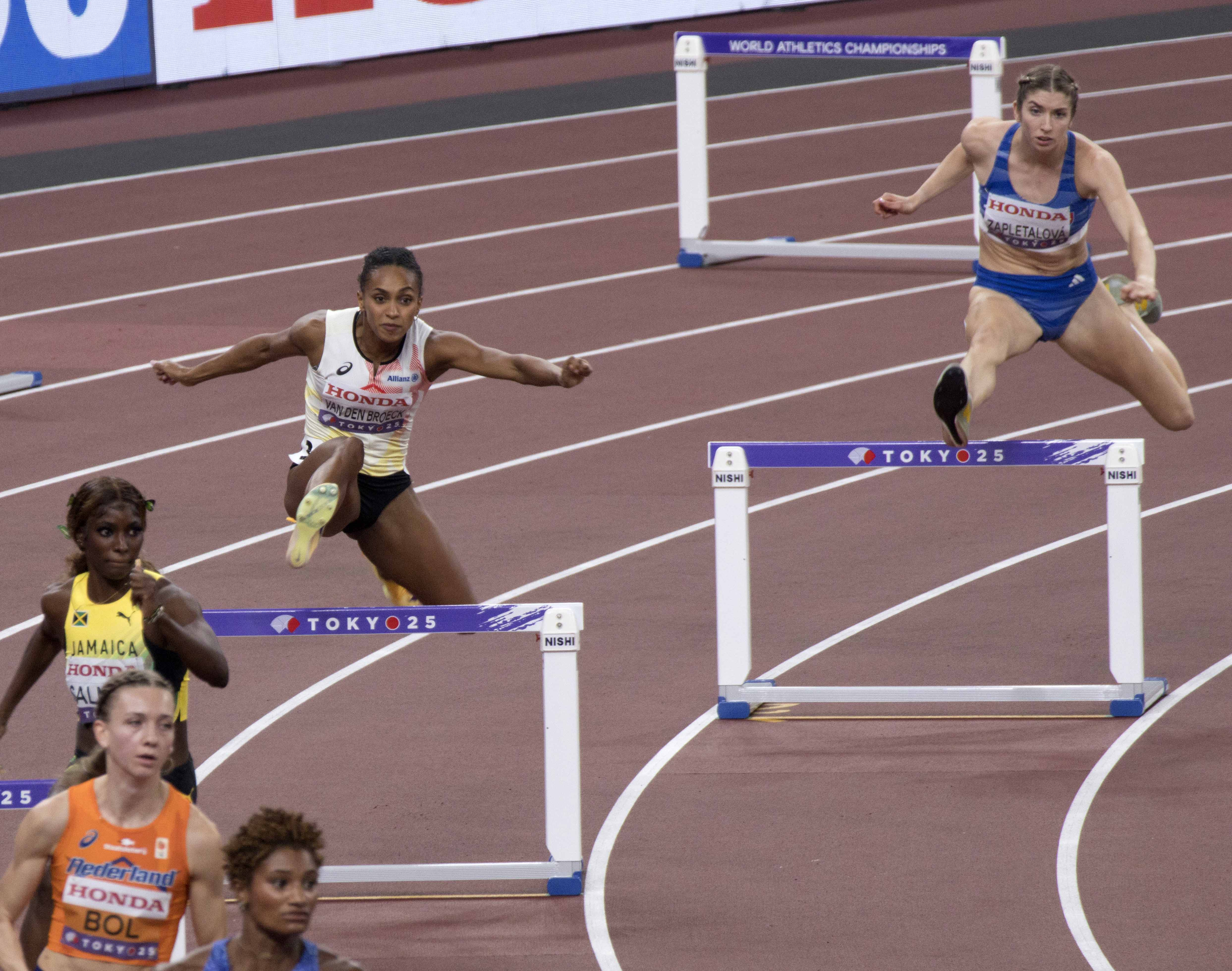
Zapletalová during the 2025 World Athletics Championships 400 m hurdles final.

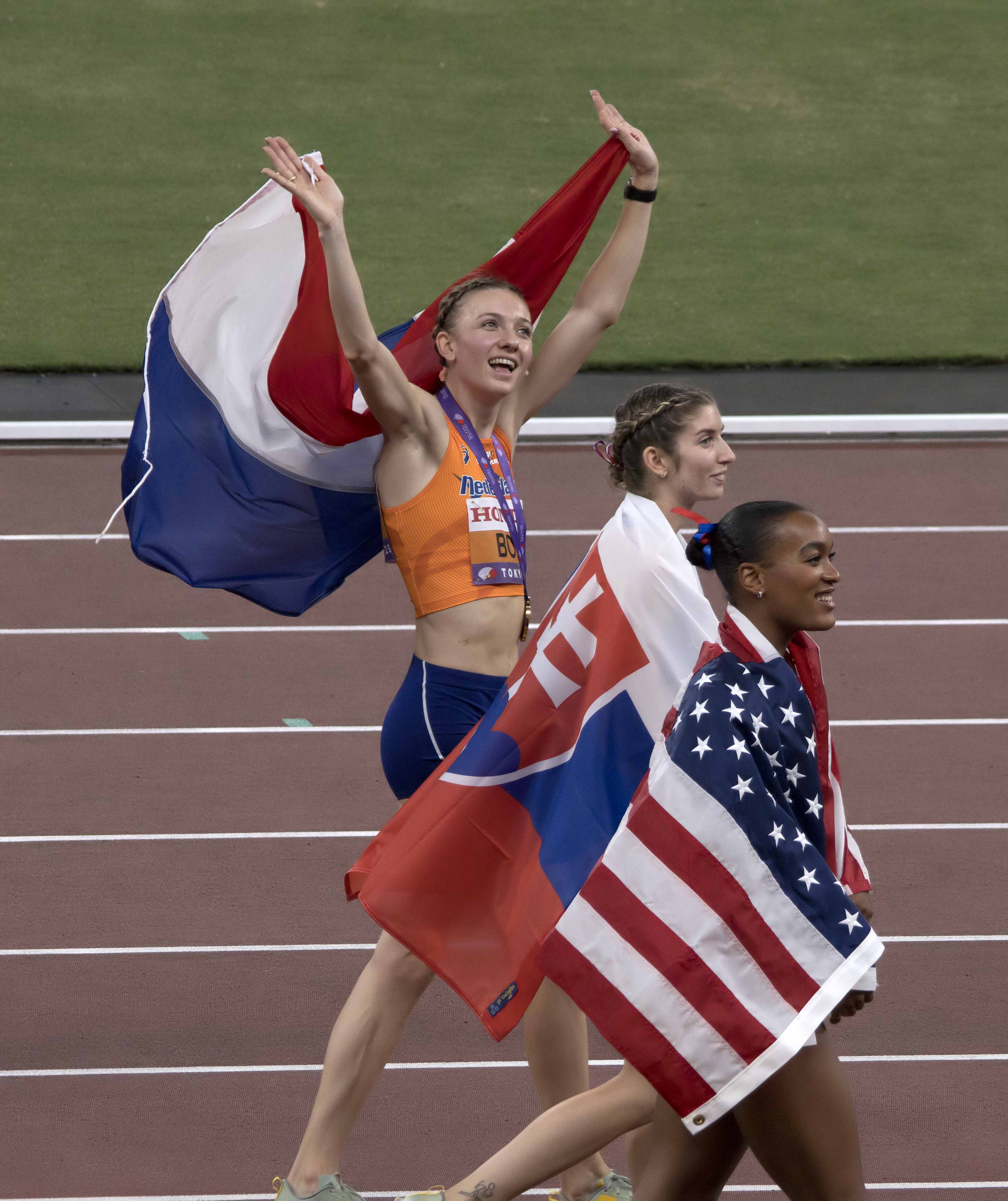
Zapletalová with Femke Broeders-Bol and Jasmine Jones after medalling in the 400 m hurdles final.

After a few years of health problems, she began to be trained by Dutchman Bram Peters in autumn 2024. In 2025, at the Central Slovak Athletics Association championship in Ostrava, she set a Slovak record in the indoor 400 metres with a time of 52.61 seconds.

She was runner-up in the 400 metres hurdles at the 2025 Bislett Games, part of the 2025 Diamond League, on 12 June 2025. On 17 June she broke the Slovak national record for the 400 metres which had stood since 1974. She won the 400 metres at the 2025 European Athletics Team Championships Second Division in Maribor on 28 June and lowered it again, running 50.76 seconds. She placed fourth in Monaco at the 2025 Herculis in the Diamond League in July 2025. She lowered the national record to 54.08 seconds at the 2025 London Athletics Meet.

She lowered her own national record to 53.18 seconds finishing runner-up to Femke Bol at the Diamond League Final in Zurich on 28 August. At the world championships in Tokyo, she won a bronze medal in the 400 metres hurdles in a new Slovak record of 53.00 seconds.

=== 2026: European Champion ===
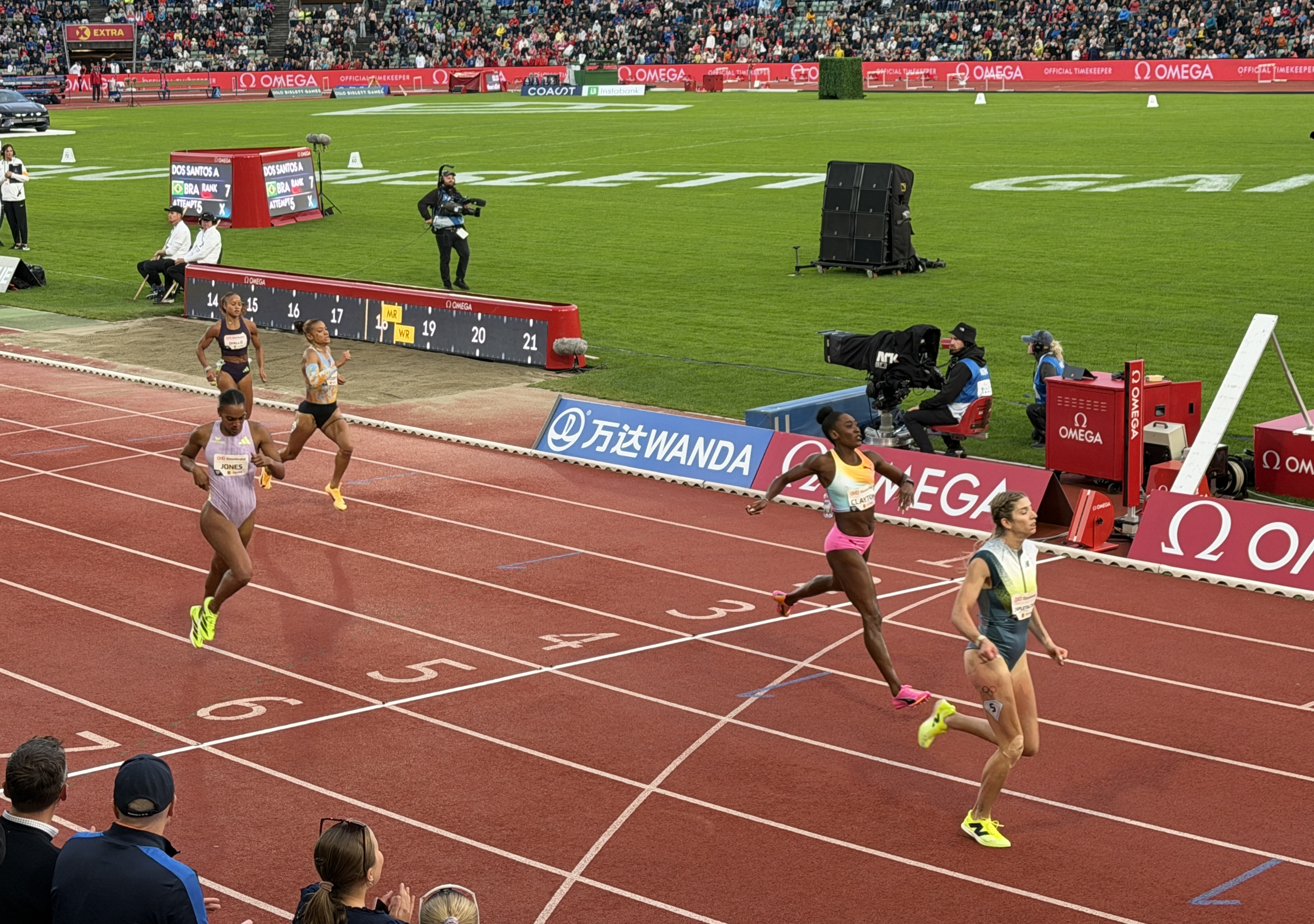
Zapletalová after winning 400 m hurdles at the 2026 Bislett Games.

Zapletalova opened her 2026 indoor season by breaking her own Slovak indoor 400 m record at the IFAM Indoor Gent in Belgium. With her time of 51.67 seconds, Zapletalova became the first Slovak to break the 52 second-barrier indoors. She lowered it again shortly afterwards, with 51.24 for the 400 metres in Ostrava on 3 February 2026 and then 50.78 in Metz on 8 February. She reached the semi-finals of the 400 m at the 2026 World Athletics Indoor Championships in Poland.

On 31 May, she set a new national record 52.82 seconds to win the 400 metres hurdles at the 2026 Diamond League in Rabat, her first time under 53 seconds. On 4 June, she lowered it again winning in 52.58 seconds at the Diamond League event in Rome. This time made her the 12th fastest 400 m hurdler of all time and 3rd on the European all-time list behind Femke Bol and Yulia Pechonkina.

On 10 and 19 June, she won her third and fourth Diamond League races of the season in Oslo and Doha, with a new national and meeting record of 52.30 seconds for the 400 metres hurdles in Doha. She became 6th fastest 400 m hurdler of all time and 2nd on the European all-time list only behind Femke Bol. While on 16 June at the Ostrava Golden Spike, Zapletalová broke the Slovak 400 m record, placing fourth in a time of 50.59.

On 12 August 2026, Zapletalová won the gold medal at the 2026 European Championships in Birmingham, England, running 52.91 seconds to win ahead of Emily Newnham of Great Britain and Fatoumata Binta Diallo of Portugal in the final. In doing so, she became the first Slovak in 16 years to win a European title. Zapletalová won her fifth Diamond League 400m hurdles of the year at the 2026 Athletissima in Lausanne on 21 August, running 52.41 seconds for the second-fastest time in the world of the season behind her own world lead set in Doha. At the 2026 Diamond League Final in Brussels on 4 September, she placed second in the 400 metres hurdles behind Anna Cockrell of the United States. Competing at the inaugural World Ultimate Championship in Budapest on 13 September, Zapletalova placed second to Jasmine Jones in 52.68 seconds, her seventh sub-53-second run of the year. She was nominated for women's European Athlete of the Year for 2026.

== Personal life ==
She studied at the Faculty of Sports Science and Health of Matej Bel University in Banská Bystrica. Her current steady partner is a colleague from the Slovak national athletics team Miroslav Úradník.

== Personal bests ==
Information based on her World Athletics profile.

Event	Time (sec)	Notes	Wind	Location	Date
200 metres	22.67	NR		Banská Bystrica, Slovakia	25 July 2026
400 metres	50.59	NR		Ostrava, Czech Republic	16 June 2026
400 meters short track	50.78	NR		Metz, France	8 February 2026
300 metres hurdles	38.97	NR		Ostrava, Czech Republic	8 September 2020
400 metres hurdles	52.30	NR		Doha, Qatar	19 June 2026

== Achievements ==
Representing Slovakia
Year	Competition	Venue	Position	Event	Time	Notes
2017	European U20 Championships	Grosseto, Italy	20th (h)	400 m	55.29	
2017	European U20 Championships	Grosseto, Italy	8th	4 × 400 m	3:44.46	
2018	World U20 Championships	Tampere, Finland	5th	400 m hurdles	57.35	
2018	World U20 Championships	Tampere, Finland	16th (h)	4 × 400 m	3:44.05	NU20R
2018	European Championships	Berlin, Germany	8th	4 × 400 m	3:32.22	
2021	World Relays	Chorzów, Poland	14th (h)	4 × 400 m mixed	3:19.66	NR
2021	European U23 Championships	Tallinn, Estonia	1st	400 m hurdles	54.28	CR NR
2021	Olympic Games	Tokyo, Japan	15th (sf)	400 m hurdles	55.79	
2022	European Championships	Munich, Germany	23rd (h)	400 m hurdles	57.42	
2025	World Championships	Tokyo, Japan	3rd	400 m hurdles	53.00	NR
2026	World Indoor Championships	Toruń, Poland	6th (h)	400 m	51.70^{1}	
2026	World Indoor Championships	Toruń, Poland	6th	4 × 400 m relay	3:32.77	
2026	European Championships	Birmingham, UK	1st	400 m hurdles	52.91	
2026	European Championships	Birmingham, UK	9th (sf)	4 × 400 m relay	3:27.02	NR
2026	World Ultimate Championship	Budapest, Hungary	2nd	400 m hurdles	52.68	

^{1}Did not start in the semifinals

=== Circuit top results ===
- Diamond League meetings
  - 2020 (400 m h): Rome Golden Gala 7th
  - 2021 (400 m h): Gateshead 1 4th, Meeting de Paris 6th
  - 2025 (400 m h): Bislett Games 2nd, Silesia 2nd, Zürich Diamond League Final 2nd
  - 2026 (400 m h): Rabat 1st, Rome Golden Gala 1st, Bislett Games 1st, Doha 1st, Lausanne 1st, Brussels Diamond League Final 2nd
- World Athletics Continental Tour meetings
  - 2020 Gold (400 m h): Gyulai István Memorial 5th, (300 m h): Golden Spike Ostrava 2nd
  - 2021 Gold (400 m h): Golden Spike Ostrava 4th, FBK Games 4th
  - 2021 Silver (400 m h): TIPOS P-T-S Meeting 2nd
  - 2025 Gold (400 m h): FBK Games 3rd
  - 2025 Silver (400 m h): TIPOS P-T-S Meeting 1st
  - 2026 Gold (400 m): Golden Spike Ostrava 4th
  - 2026 Silver (400 m h): TIPOS P-T-S Meeting 1st
