= 2026 European Athletics Championships – Women's 400 metres hurdles =

Women's 400 metres hurdles at the 2026 European Athletics Championships
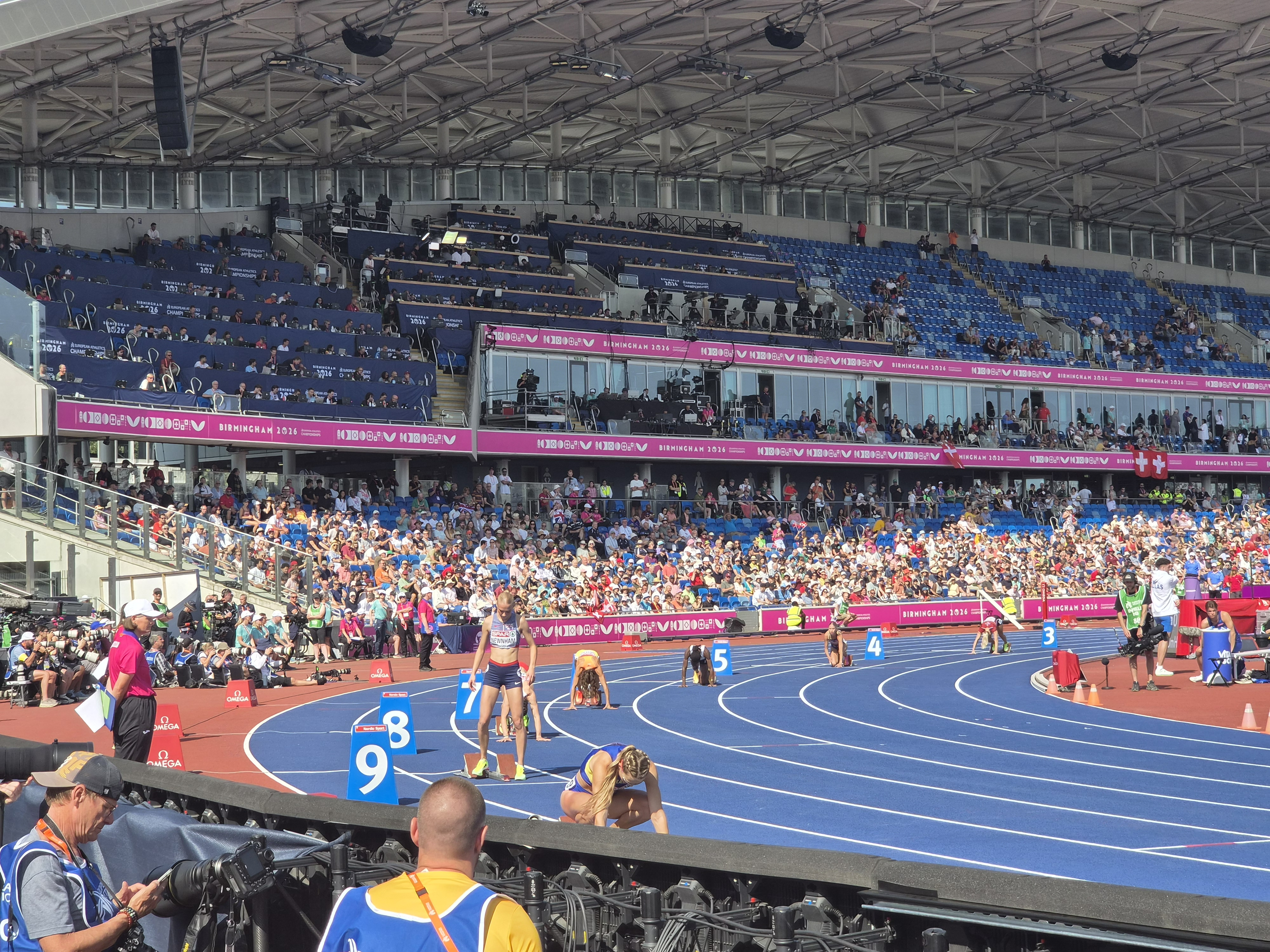
- Venue: Alexander Stadium
- Location: Birmingham, United Kingdom
- Dates: 10 August 2026 (round 1); 11 August 2026 (semi-finals); 12 August 2026 (final)
- Competitors: 36 (target)
- Winning time: 52.91

Medalists
gold medal	Emma Zapletalová	Slovakia
silver medal	Emily Newnham	Great Britain
bronze medal	Fatoumata Binta Diallo	Portugal

The women's 400 metres hurdles at the 2026 European Athletics Championships took place over three rounds at the Alexander Stadium in Birmingham, United Kingdom, from 10 to 12 August 2026.

== Background ==
Records before the 2026 European Athletics Championships
Record	Athlete (nation)	Time	Location	Date
World record	Sydney McLaughlin-Levrone (USA)	50.37	Saint-Denis, France	8 August 2024
European record	Femke Bol (NED)	50.95	La Chaux-de-Fonds, Switzerland	14 July 2024
Championship record	Femke Bol (NED)	52.49	Rome, Italy	11 June 2024
World leading	Emma Zapletalová (SVK)	52.30	Doha, Qatar	19 June 2026
European leading	Emma Zapletalová (SVK)	52.30	Doha, Qatar	19 June 2026

== Qualification ==
For the women's 400 metres hurdles, the qualification period was from 27 July 2025 to 26 July 2026. Athletes qualified by running the entry standard of 55.30 or faster, by wildcard for the 2024 European Athletics Champion (not used since Femke Bol chose not to participate), or by their position on the World Athletics Rankings for the event. The target number was 36 athletes.

Qualification standings per 31 July 2026
QP	CP	Country	Athlete	PB	SB	Status	Details
1	1	Slovakia	Emma Zapletalová	52.30	52.30	Qualified by Entry Standard	52.30 - Suhaim bin Hamad Stadium, Doha (QAT) - 19 JUN 2026
2	1	Great Britain & N.I.	Emily Newnham	53.92	53.92	Qualified by Entry Standard	53.92 - Estadio Vallehermoso, Madrid (ESP) - 16 JUL 2026
3	1	Belgium	Paulien Couckuyt	53.90	53.90	Qualified by Entry Standard	53.98 - Ratinan Stadion, Tampere (FIN) - 12 JUL 2026
4	1	Norway	Amalie Iuel	54.05	54.05	Qualified by Entry Standard	54.05 - Stadio Olimpico, Roma (ITA) - 04 JUN 2026
5	1	France	Louise Maraval	53.71	54.05	Qualified by Entry Standard	54.05 - Estadio Vallehermoso, Madrid (ESP) - 16 JUL 2026
6	1	Finland	Hilla Uusimäki	54.28	54.28	Qualified by Entry Standard	54.28 - Ratinan Stadion, Tampere (FIN) - 12 JUL 2026
7	1	Germany	Eileen Demes	54.29	54.67	Qualified by Entry Standard	54.29 - Olympiastadion, Berlin (GER) - 27 JUL 2025
8	1	Portugal	Fatoumata Binta Diallo	54.31	54.31	Qualified by Entry Standard	54.31 - Stadion Podskarbińska, Warszawa (POL) - 07 JUN 2026
9	2	Portugal	Sofia Lavreshina	54.31	54.31	Qualified by Entry Standard	54.31 - Estádio 1º de Maio, Braga (POR) - 11 JUL 2026
10	1	Italy	Alice Muraro	54.36	54.90	Qualified by Entry Standard	54.36 - National Stadium, Tokyo (JPN) - 15 SEP 2025
11	1	Spain	Sara Gallego	54.34	54.36	Qualified by Entry Standard	54.36 - Estadio Vallehermoso, Madrid (ESP) - 16 JUL 2026
12	2	Italy	Ayomide Folorunso	53.89	54.41	Qualified by Entry Standard	54.37 - National Stadium, Tokyo (JPN) - 17 SEP 2025
13	1	Austria	Anja Dlauhy	54.52	54.52	Qualified by Entry Standard	54.52 - Innsbruck USI, Innsbruck (AUT) - 25 JUL 2026
14	2	Austria	Lena Pressler	54.55	54.55	Qualified by Entry Standard	54.55 - Innsbruck USI, Innsbruck (AUT) - 25 JUL 2026
15	2	Great Britain & N.I.	Lina Nielsen	54.43	54.69	Qualified by Entry Standard	54.69 - Štadión SNP, Banská Bystrica (SVK) - 21 JUL 2026
16	2	Slovakia	Daniela Ledecká	54.69	55.26	Qualified by Entry Standard	54.86 - National Stadium, Tokyo (JPN) - 15 SEP 2025
17	1	Poland	Anna Gryc	54.97	54.97	Qualified by Entry Standard	54.97 - Golęcin Stadion, Poznan (POL) - 28 JUN 2026
18	1	Switzerland	Lena Wernli	55.02	55.40	Qualified by Entry Standard	55.02 - Letzigrund, Zürich (SUI) - 28 AUG 2025
19	1	Hungary	Sára Mátó	55.08	55.08	Qualified by Entry Standard	55.08 - Sportzentrum Niederösterreich, St. Pölten (AUT) - 04 JUN 2026
20	3	Italy	Rebecca Sartori	54.82	55.66	Qualified by Entry Standard	55.11 - Giovanni Chiggiato Stadium, Caorle (ITA) - 03 AUG 2025
21	2	France	Méta Tumba	55.22	55.22	Qualified by Entry Standard	55.22 - Stadium Municipal, Albi (FRA) - 26 JUL 2026
22	2	Finland	Heidi Salminen	55.27	55.27	Qualified by Entry Standard	55.27 - Harjun stadion, Jyväskylä (FIN) - 26 JUL 2026
23	1	Monaco	Marie-Charlotte Gastaud	58.63	58.63	Qualified by Universality Place	
24	1	Ukraine	Viktoriya Tkachuk	53.76	55.23	Qualified by World Rankings	20th - 1195 points
reserve	4	Italy	Linda Olivieri	54.99	55.53	Qualified by World Rankings	26th - 1187 points
25	2	Poland	Izabela Smolińska	55.48	55.48	Qualified by World Rankings	28th - 1181 points
26	2	Norway	Andrea Rooth	55.65	55.65	Qualified by World Rankings	29th - 1180 points
27	2	Switzerland	Yasmin Giger	54.77	55.90	Qualified by World Rankings	30th - 1171 points
28	1	Denmark	Martha Rasmussen	56.49	56.49	Qualified by World Rankings	32nd - 1168 points
29	3	Switzerland	Annina Fahr	55.50	56.53	Qualified by World Rankings	34th - 1166 points
30	1	Estonia	Viola Hambidge	56.00	56.00	Qualified by World Rankings	35th - 1166 points
31	3	Norway	Elisabeth Slettum	55.77	56.06	Qualified by World Rankings	36th - 1166 points
32	1	Sweden	Moa Granat	55.28	56.43	Qualified by World Rankings	38th - 1163 points
33	1	Croatia	Natalija Švenda	56.01	56.22	Qualified by World Rankings	40th - 1162 points
34	2	Ukraine	Alina Kyshkina	56.09	56.09	Qualified by World Rankings	41st - 1162 points
35	2	Germany	Vanessa Baldé	55.36	55.39	Qualified by World Rankings	42nd - 1161 points
36	2	Sweden	Tilde Bjerager	55.82	55.82	Qualified by World Rankings	44th - 1158 points
reserve	2	Hungary	Petra Lalik	56.77	56.77	Next best by World Rankings	50th - 1146 points
reserve	4	Switzerland	Vera Stocker	56.20	56.20	Next best by World Rankings	53rd - 1145 points
reserve	3	Hungary	Regina Mohai	56.34	56.34	Next best by World Rankings	55th - 1136 points
reserve	1	Greece	Dimitra Gnafaki	56.14	57.24	Next best by World Rankings	58th - 1135 points
reserve	1	Israel	Noah Levy	57.47	57.47	Next best by World Rankings	64th - 1129 points
reserve	3	Slovakia	Rebecca Slezáková	57.02	57.02	Next best by World Rankings	65th - 1127 points
reserve	1	Serbia	Maja Gajić	57.41	57.90	Next best by World Rankings	70th - 1120 points
reserve	5	Italy	Angelica Ghergo	57.11	57.11	Next best by World Rankings	74th - 1117 points
reserve	1	Cyprus	Kalypso Stavrou	58.06	59.39	Next best by World Rankings	103rd - 1078 points

Bye to semi-finals	Reserve activated	Withdrawal / reserve unused

== Schedule ==
Date	Time	Round
10 August 2026	12:35	Round 1
11 August 2026	10:45	Semi-finals
12 August 2026	21:08	Final

All times are local times (UTC+1)

== Results ==
=== Round 1 ===
Round 1 was held on 10 August 2026, at 12:35 in the afternoon. 12 best performers (q) advanced to the semi-finals.

==== Heat 1 ====
Place	Lane	Athlete	Nation	Time	Notes
1	8	Lena Pressler	Austria	54.97	q
2	3	Daniela Ledecká	Slovakia	55.93	q
3	9	Rebecca Sartori	Italy	56.18	q
4	7	Lena Wernli	Switzerland	56.25	q
5	2	Viola Hambidge	Estonia	56.66	
6	5	Sára Mátó	Hungary	56.82	
7	6	Elisabeth Slettum	Norway	56.83	
8	4	Marie-Charlotte Gastaud	Monaco	1:00.45	

==== Heat 2 ====
Place	Lane	Athlete	Nation	Time	Notes
1	7	Lina Nielsen	Great Britain & N.I.	55.08	q
2	6	Heidi Salminen	Finland	55.93	q
3	4	Alina Kyshkina	Ukraine	56.12	q
4	9	Martha Rasmussen	Denmark	56.34	q, PB
5	3	Vanessa Baldé	Germany	56.52	
6	8	Yasmin Giger	Switzerland	56.57	
7	2	Anna Gryc	Poland	56.66	
8	5	Tilde Bjerager	Sweden	57.03	

==== Heat 3 ====
Place	Lane	Athlete	Nation	Time	Notes
1	8	Anja Dlauhy	Austria	55.42	q
2	4	Viktoriya Tkachuk	Ukraine	55.60	q
3	6	Izabela Smolińska	Poland	55.91	q
4	9	Moa Granat	Sweden	56.11	q, SB
5	5	Andrea Rooth	Norway	56.57 [.570]	
6	7	Méta Tumba	France	56.57 [.570]	
7	3	Natalija Švenda	Croatia	57.28	
8	2	Annina Fahr	Switzerland	57.99	

=== Semi-finals ===
The semi-finals were held on 11 August 2026, at 10:45 in the morning. First 2 in each heat (Q) and the next 2 by time (q) qualified for the final.

==== Heat 1 ====
Place	Lane	Athlete	Nation	Time	Notes
1	5	Ayomide Folorunso	Italy	53.93	Q, SB
2	8	Emily Newnham	Great Britain & N.I.	54.32	Q
3	7	Louise Maraval	France	54.50	q
4	9	Viktoriya Tkachuk	Ukraine	54.95	SB
5	6	Sara Gallego	Spain	55.24	
6	2	Moa Granat	Sweden	56.13	
7	4	Heidi Salminen	Finland	56.39	
8	3	Martha Rasmussen	Denmark	56.74	

==== Heat 2 ====
Place	Lane	Athlete	Nation	Time	Notes
1	7	Emma Zapletalová	Slovakia	54.09	Q
2	5	Fatoumata Binta Diallo	Portugal	54.34	Q
3	4	Eileen Demes	Germany	54.63	SB
4	8	Hilla Uusimäki	Finland	54.70	
5	9	Alice Muraro	Italy	56.19	
6	3	Lena Wernli	Switzerland	57.17	
7	6	Lena Pressler	Austria	1:01.85	
—	2	Alina Kyshkina	Ukraine	DNF	

==== Heat 3 ====
Place	Lane	Athlete	Nation	Time	Notes
1	5	Paulien Couckuyt	Belgium	53.87	Q, PB
2	4	Lina Nielsen	Great Britain & N.I.	54.04	Q, PB
3	6	Amalie Iuel	Norway	54.22	q
4	8	Sofia Lavreshina	Portugal	54.79	
5	9	Daniela Ledecká	Slovakia	55.22	SB
6	7	Anja Dlauhy	Austria	55.22	
7	3	Izabela Smolińska	Poland	55.52	
8	2	Rebecca Sartori	Italy	56.24	

=== Final ===
The final was held on 12 August 2026, at 21:08 in the evening.

Rank	Lane	Name	Nationality	Time	Note
1st place, gold medalist(s)	7	Emma Zapletalová	Slovakia	52.91	
2nd place, silver medalist(s)	9	Emily Newnham	Great Britain & N.I.	53.33	PB
3rd place, bronze medalist(s)	4	Fatoumata Binta Diallo	Portugal	53.55	NR
4	5	Paulien Couckuyt	Belgium	53.87	=PB
5	6	Ayomide Folorunso	Italy	54.29	
6	8	Lina Nielsen	Great Britain & N.I.	54.35	
7	2	Amalie Iuel	Norway	54.70	
8	3	Louise Maraval	France	54.88	
