= Yasmin Giger =

Swiss hurdler (born 1999)

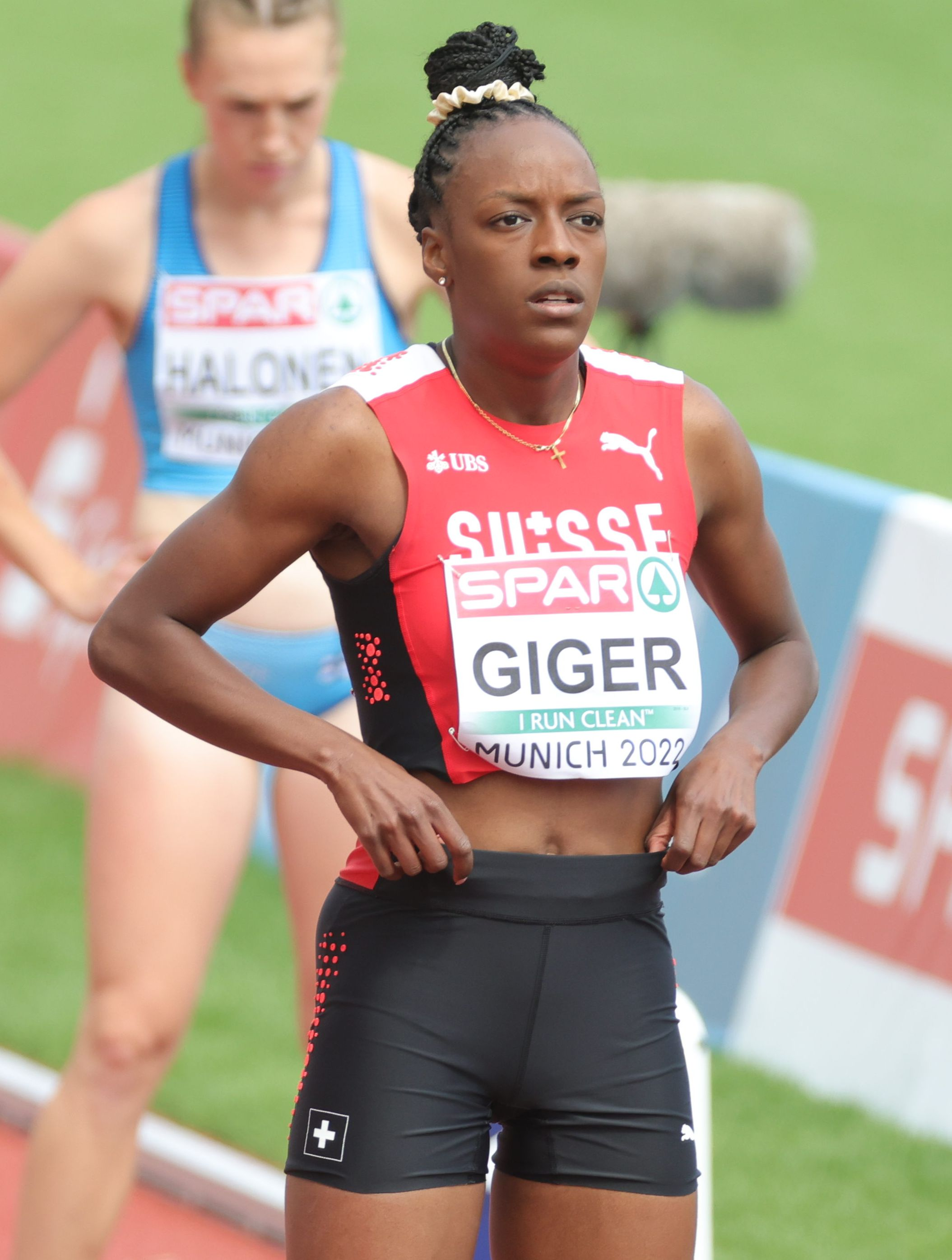
- Giger at the 2022 European Championships

Personal information
- Born: 6 November 1999 (age 26)
- Home town: Romanshorn, Thurgau, Switzerland
- Height: 1.80 m (5 ft 11 in)
- Weight: 60 kg (132 lb)

Sport
- Country: Switzerland
- Sport: Athletics
- Event: 400 m hurdles
- Club: LC Zürich
- Coached by: Flavio Zberg

Achievements and titles
- Personal best: 400 m hurdles: 55.25 (Tallinn 2021) NU23R
Medal record
Women's athletics
Representing Switzerland
World U20 Championships
| Bronze medal – third place | 2018 Tampere | 400 m hurdles |
European U23 Championships
| Bronze medal – third place | 2019 Gävle | 400 m hurdles |
| Bronze medal – third place | 2021 Tallinn | 400 m hurdles |
European U20 Championships
| Gold medal – first place | 2017 Grosseto | 400 m hurdles |
European U18 Championships
| Silver medal – second place | 2016 Tbilisi | 400 m hurdles |
European Youth Olympic Festival
| Silver medal – second place | 2015 Tbilisi | 400 m |

Yasmin Giger (born 6 November 1999) is a Swiss athlete specialising in the 400 metres hurdles. She won a gold medal at the 2017 European U20 Championships. Currently, she is the national champion in both the 400 metres and the 400 metres hurdles.

Her personal best in the event is 55.25 seconds set in Tallinn in 2021, which is a national U23 record. Earlier in her career, she competed in the heptathlon.

== Career ==
=== 2015 ===
Giger made her international debut at the 2015 European Youth Olympic Festival in Tbilisi and finished in second place in the 400 metres. Also, she earned a national title in the indoor 800 metres.

=== 2016 ===
The following year, Giger would return to Tbilisi for the 2016 European Youth Championships. She ran in the 400 metres hurdles and finished in second place. Additionally, she earned another national title in the indoor 800 metres.

== Personal life ==
Giger is of Dominican descent through her mother.

She credits her older brother Zaafir, who plays football, for sparking her interest in sports ever since she was 7 years old. She would attend his football matches with their mother and found herself fascinated by her brother's speed. She wanted to be as fast as him, so she tried out athletics and fell in love with it. Giger worked diligently on developing her skills and trained at different clubs: TV St. Peterzell, TV Herisau, Amriswil Athletics.

== Achievements ==
=== International competitions ===
| Year | Competition | Venue | Position | Event | Time | Notes |
Representing Switzerland
| 2015 | European Youth Olympic Festival | Tbilisi, Georgia | 2nd | 400 m | 55.02 | |
| 2016 | European Youth Championships | Tbilisi, Georgia | 2nd | 400 m hurdles | 58.39 | |
| 2016 | European Youth Championships | Tbilisi, Georgia | – | Medley relay | DNF | |
| 2017 | European Indoor Championships | Belgrade, Serbia | 25th (h) | 400 m | 54.76 | |
| 2017 | European U20 Championships | Grosseto, Italy | 1st | 400 m hurdles | 55.90 | |
| 2017 | World Championships | London, United Kingdom | 36th (h) | 400 m hurdles | 57.72 | |
| 2018 | World U20 Championships | Tampere, Finland | 3rd | 400 m hurdles | 56.98 | SB |
| 2018 | European Championships | Berlin, Germany | 17th (sf) | 400 m hurdles | 56.81 | EU20L |
| 2018 | European Championships | Berlin, Germany | 10th (h) | 4 × 400 m relay | 3:32.86 | |
| 2019 | European Indoor Championships | Glasgow, United Kingdom | 29th (h) | 400 m | 53.84 | |
| 2019 | European Indoor Championships | Glasgow, United Kingdom | 6th | 4 × 400 m relay | 3:33.72 | NR |
| 2019 | World Relays | Yokohama, Japan | 7th | 4 × 400 m relay | 3:32.32 | |
| 2019 | European U23 Championships | Gävle, Sweden | 3rd | 400 m hurdles | 56.37 | SB |
| 2019 | World Championships | Doha, Qatar | 14th (h) | 4 × 400 m relay | 3:30.63 | |
| 2021 | Olympic Games | Tokyo, Japan | 33rd (h) | 400 m hurdles | 57.03 | |
| 2021 | Olympic Games | Tokyo, Japan | 12th (h) | 4 × 400 m relay | 3:25.90 | NR |
| 2021 | European U23 Championships | Tallinn, Estonia | 3rd | 400 m hurdles | 55.25 | NU23R |
| 2022 | World Championships | Eugene, OR, United States | 24th (sf) | 400 m hurdles | 56.31 | |
| 2022 | World Championships | Eugene, OR, United States | 8th | 4 × 400 m relay | 3:27.81 | SB |
| 2022 | European Championships | Munich, Germany | 20th (sf) | 400 m hurdles | 57.13 | |
| 2023 | European Indoor Championships | Istanbul, Turkey | 20th (h) | 400 m | 53.89 | |
| 2023 | World Championships | Budapest, Hungary | 27th (h) | 400 m hurdles | 56.16 | |
| 2024 | European Championships | Rome, Italy | 14th (sf) | 400 m hurdles | 55.05 | |
| 2024 | European Championships | Rome, Italy | 11th (h) | 4 × 400 m relay | 3:27.48 | |
| 2024 | Olympic Games | Paris, France | 11th (rep) | 400 m hurdles | 55.18 | |
| 2024 | Olympic Games | Paris, France | 14th (h) | 4 × 400 m relay | 3:29.75 | |
| 2026 | European Championships | Birmingham, United Kingdom | 14th (h) | 400 m hurdles | 56.57 | |
| 2026 | European Championships | Birmingham, United Kingdom | 12th (h) | 4 × 400 m relay | 3:30.12 | |

=== National titles ===
- Swiss Championships (3)
  - 400 metres hurdles: 2019, 2020, 2023
- Swiss Indoor Championships (6)
  - 400 metres: 2017, 2018, 2019, 2023
  - 800 metres: 2015, 2016

== See also ==
- List of Swiss records in athletics
- Switzerland at the Olympics
