= Athletics at the 2020 Summer Olympics – Women's 400 metres hurdles =

Women's 400 metres hurdles at the Games of the XXXII Olympiad
- Venue: Japan National Stadium; Tokyo, Japan
- Dates: 31 July 2021 (round 1); 2 August 2021 (semi-finals); 4 August 2021 (final)
- Competitors: 39 from 25 nations
- Winning time: 51.46 s WR

Medalists
1st place, gold medalist(s)		Sydney McLaughlin	United States
2nd place, silver medalist(s)		Dalilah Muhammad	United States
3rd place, bronze medalist(s)		Femke Bol	Netherlands

The women's 400 metres hurdles at the 2020 Summer Olympics was held over three rounds at the Japan National Stadium in Tokyo, Japan, from 31 July to 4 August 2021. 39 athletes from 25 nations competed.

At the U.S. Olympic trials in June 2021, Sydney McLaughlin became the first woman to run the event in under 52 seconds, improving Dalilah Muhammad's world record of 52.16 secs to 51.90. In Tokyo, both women ran inside the world record, with McLaughlin winning the gold medal with a new world record time of 51.46, while 2016 Olympic champion Muhammad ran 51.58 for the silver medal. Dutch athlete Femke Bol broke the European record with 52.03 for the bronze, to move to third on the world all-time list. Another three national records (for Colombia, Belgium and Panama) were set during the competition.

== Background ==
This was the 10th appearance of the event, having appeared at every Olympics since 1984.

The three-round format of the event was introduced in 2012.

Prior to this competition, the existing global and area records were as follows.

Global records before the 2020 Summer Olympics
Record	Athlete (nation)	Time	Location	Date
World record	Sydney McLaughlin (USA)	51.90	Eugene, Oregon, United States	27 June 2021
World leading	Sydney McLaughlin (USA)	51.90	Eugene, Oregon, United States	27 June 2021
Olympic record	Melaine Walker (JAM)	52.64	Beijing, China	20 August 2008

Area records before the 2020 Summer Olympics
Record	Athlete (nation)	Time	Location	Date
African record	Nezha Bidouane (MAR)	52.90	Seville, Spain	25 August 1999
Asian record	Han Qing (CHN)	53.96	Beijing, China	9 September 1993
Asian record	Song Yinglan (CHN)	53.96	Guangzhou, China	17 November 2001
European record	Yuliya Pechonkina (RUS)	52.34	Tula, Russia	8 August 2003
North, Central American and Caribbean record	Sydney McLaughlin (USA)	51.90 WR	Eugene, Oregon, United States	27 June 2021
Oceanian record	Debbie Flintoff-King (AUS)	53.17	Seoul, South Korea	28 September 1988
South American record	Gianna Woodruff (PAN)	55.60	Barranquilla, Colombia	31 July 2018

== Qualification ==
A National Olympic Committee (NOC) could enter up to 3 qualified athletes in the women's 400 metres hurdles event if all athletes meet the entry standard or qualify by ranking during the qualifying period. (The limit of 3 has been in place since the 1930 Olympic Congress.) The qualifying standard is 55.40 seconds. This standard was "set for the sole purpose of qualifying athletes with exceptional performances unable to qualify through the IAAF World Rankings pathway." The world rankings, based on the average of the best five results for the athlete over the qualifying period and weighted by the importance of the meet, will then be used to qualify athletes until the cap of 40 is reached.

The qualifying period was originally from 1 May 2019 to 29 June 2020. Due to the COVID-19 pandemic, the period was suspended from 6 April 2020 to 30 November 2020, with the end date extended to 29 June 2021. The world rankings period start date was also changed from 1 May 2019 to 30 June 2020; athletes who had met the qualifying standard during that time were still qualified, but those using world rankings would not be able to count performances during that time. The qualifying time standards could be obtained in various meets during the given period that have the approval of the IAAF. Both indoor and outdoor meets are eligible. The most recent Area Championships may be counted in the ranking, even if not during the qualifying period.

NOCs can also use their universality place—each NOC can enter one female athlete regardless of time if they had no female athletes meeting the entry standard for an athletics event—in the 400 metres hurdles.

== Results ==
=== Round 1 ===
Thirty-nine athletes from twenty-five nations competed in the five heats of round 1 on 31 July 2021, starting at 9:00 (UTC+9) in the morning. The first four athletes in each heat (Q) and the next four fastest athletes overall (q) qualified to the semi-finals. In the first heat, Melissa Gonzalez of Colombia set a national record (NR) of 55.32 s. In the second heat, Paulien Couckuyt of Belgium set a national record (NR) of 54.90 s. In the third heat, Mariya Mykolenko of Ukraine received a yellow card for disturbing the start, Jessie Knight of Great Britain did not finish the race (DNF), and Leah Nugent of Jamaica was disqualified (DQ) for lane infringement (TR 17.3.1). In the fourth heat, Sparkle McKnight of Trinidad and Tobago did not start (DNS) and Ronda Whyte of Jamaica was disqualified for a false start (TR 16.8).

Results of round 1
Rank	Heat	Lane	Athlete	Nation	Time	Notes
1	5	3	Dalilah Muhammad	United States	53.97	Q
2	4	8	Femke Bol	Netherlands	54.43	Q
3	2	2	Anna Ryzhykova	Ukraine	54.56	Q
4	3	5	Sydney McLaughlin	United States	54.65	Q
5	5	5	Carolina Krafzik	Germany	54.72	Q, PB
6	5	9	Léa Sprunger	Switzerland	54.74	Q, SB
7	1	9	Viktoriya Tkachuk	Ukraine	54.80	Q
8	2	7	Janieve Russell	Jamaica	54.81	Q
9	2	9	Paulien Couckuyt	Belgium	54.90	Q, NR
10	5	8	Joanna Linkiewicz	Poland	54.93	Q, PB
11	5	6	Zurian Hechavarría	Cuba	54.99	q, PB
12	5	7	Emma Zapletalová	Slovakia	55.00	q
13	1	3	Melissa Gonzalez	Colombia	55.32	Q, NR
14	1	7	Anna Cockrell	United States	55.37	Q
15	3	7	Gianna Woodruff	Panama	55.49	Q
16	3	9	Sara Slott Petersen	Denmark	55.52	Q
17	2	8	Linda Olivieri	Italy	55.54	Q, =PB
18	1	8	Sage Watson	Canada	55.54	Q
19	1	6	Yadisleidis Pedroso	Italy	55.57	q, SB
20	1	5	Amalie Iuel	Norway	55.65	q
21	2	6	Viivi Lehikoinen	Finland	55.67	
22	4	7	Tia-Adana Belle	Barbados	55.69	Q, SB
23	3	8	Quách Thị Lan	Vietnam	55.71	Q, SB
24	2	3	Noelle Montcalm	Canada	55.85	SB
25	1	2	Aminat Yusuf Jamal	Bahrain	55.90	SB
26	2	5	Meghan Beesley	Great Britain	55.91	
27	4	3	Wenda Nel	South Africa	56.06	Q
28	1	4	Hanne Claes	Belgium	56.38	SB
29	5	2	Line Kloster	Norway	56.45	
30	3	3	Eleonora Marchiando	Italy	56.82	
31	4	5	Jessica Turner	Great Britain	56.83	Q
32	4	6	Sarah Carli	Australia	56.93	SB
33	4	9	Yasmin Giger	Switzerland	57.03	
34	5	4	Loubna Benhadja	Algeria	57.19	PB
35	2	4	Chayenne da Silva	Brazil	57.55	
36	3	4	Mariya Mykolenko	Ukraine	57.86	TR 16.5.3
	3	2	Jessie Knight	Great Britain	DNF	
	3	6	Leah Nugent	Jamaica	DQ	TR 17.3.1
	4	2	Ronda Whyte	Jamaica	DQ	TR 16.8
	4	4	Sparkle McKnight	Trinidad and Tobago	DNS	

=== Semi-finals ===
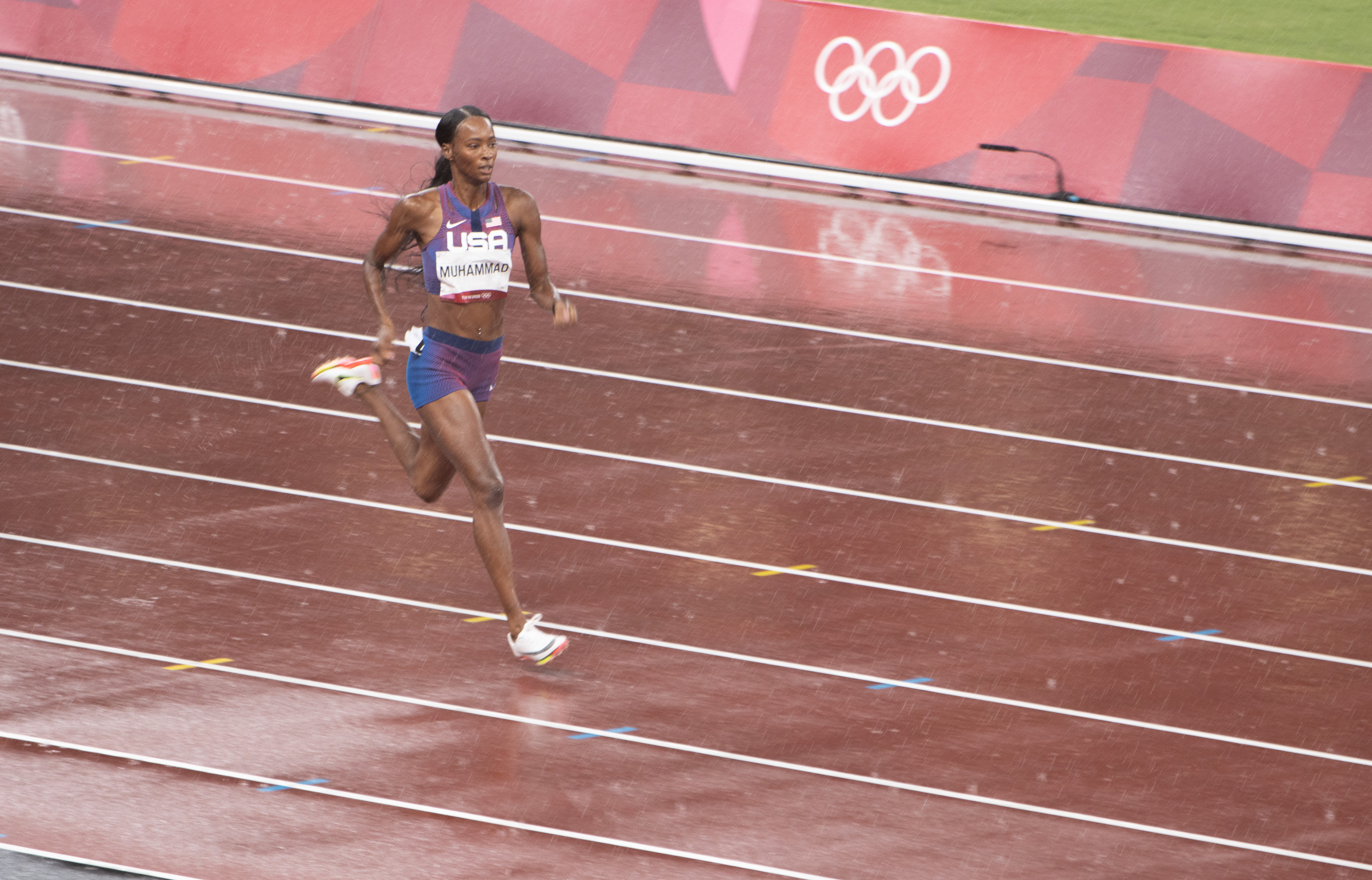
Dalilah Muhammad of the United States in the first heat of the semi-finals

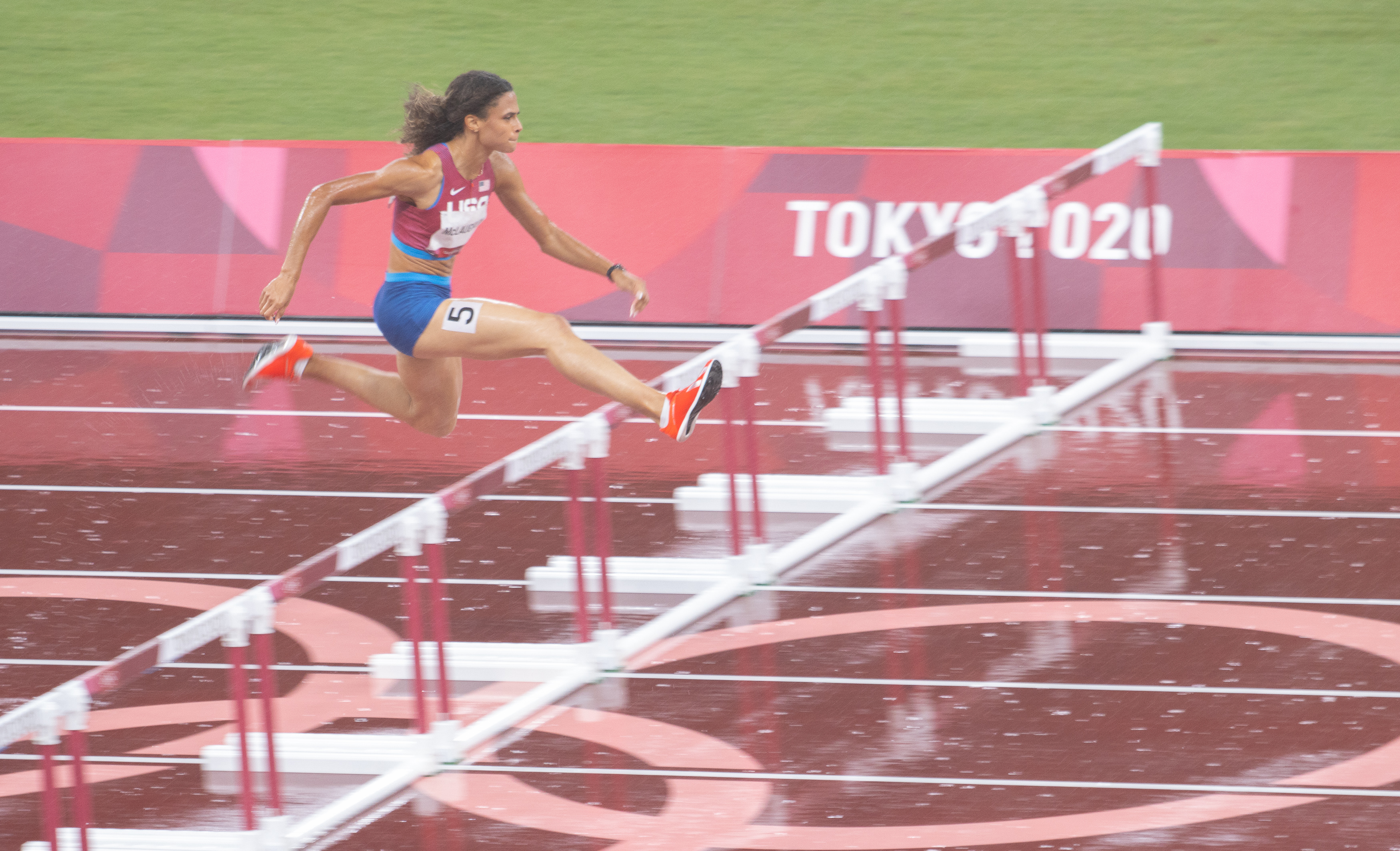
Sydney McLaughlin of the United States in the second heat of the semi-finals

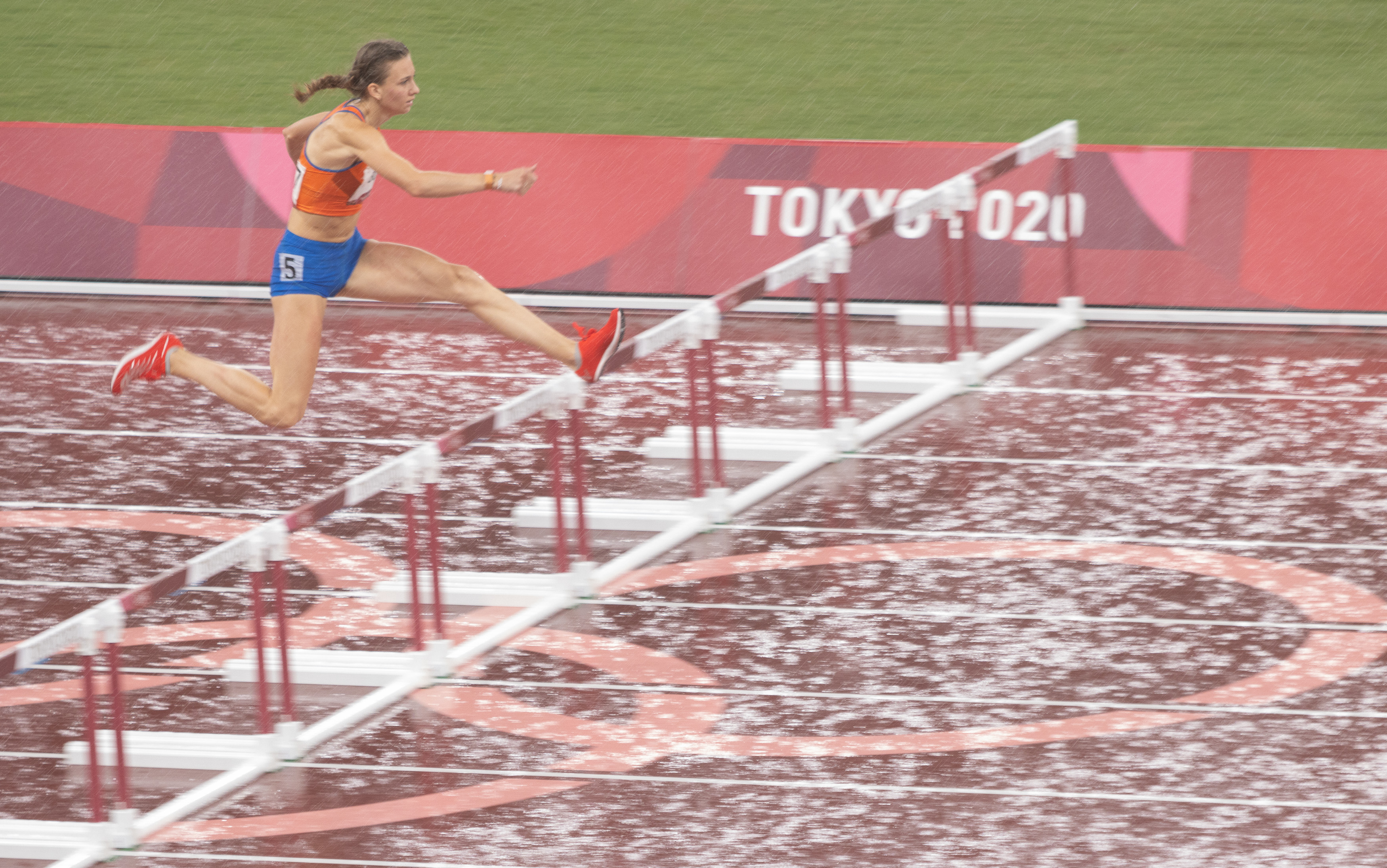
Femke Bol of the Netherlands in the third heat of the semi-finals

Twenty-four athletes from twenty nations competed in the three heats of the semi-finals on 2 August 2021, starting at 19:00 (UTC+9) in the evening. The first two athletes in each heat (Q) and the next two fastest athletes overall (q) qualified for the final. In the first heat, Paulien Couckuyt of Belgium set a national record (NR) of 54.47 s, improving her record from round 1. In the second heat, Gianna Woodruff of Panama set a national record (NR) of 54.22 s. In the third heat, Sara Slott Petersen of Denmark was disqualified (DQ) for not going over every hurdle (TR 22.6).

Results of the semi-finals
Rank	Heat	Lane	Athlete	Nation	Time	Notes
1	2	5	Sydney McLaughlin	United States	53.03	Q
2	1	7	Dalilah Muhammad	United States	53.30	Q
3	3	5	Femke Bol	Netherlands	53.91	Q
4	1	6	Janieve Russell	Jamaica	54.10	Q
5	3	8	Anna Cockrell	United States	54.17	Q
6	2	4	Gianna Woodruff	Panama	54.22	Q, NR
7	2	6	Anna Ryzhykova	Ukraine	54.23	q
8	3	7	Viktoriya Tkachuk	Ukraine	54.25	q
9	1	5	Paulien Couckuyt	Belgium	54.47	NR
10	1	4	Carolina Krafzik	Germany	54.96	
11	3	6	Léa Sprunger	Switzerland	55.12	
12	2	3	Zurian Hechavarría	Cuba	55.21	
13	1	8	Sage Watson	Canada	55.51	
14	2	9	Joanna Linkiewicz	Poland	55.67	
15	2	2	Emma Zapletalová	Slovakia	55.79	
16	3	2	Yadisleidis Pedroso	Italy	55.80	
17	2	8	Wenda Nel	South Africa	56.35	
18	1	3	Quách Thị Lan	Vietnam	56.78	
19	1	9	Linda Olivieri	Italy	57.03	
20	3	4	Melissa Gonzalez	Colombia	57.47	
21	1	2	Amalie Iuel	Norway	57.61	
22	2	7	Tia-Adana Belle	Barbados	59.26	
23	3	3	Jessica Turner	Great Britain	1:00.36	
	3	9	Sara Slott Petersen	Denmark	DQ	TR 22.6

=== Final ===
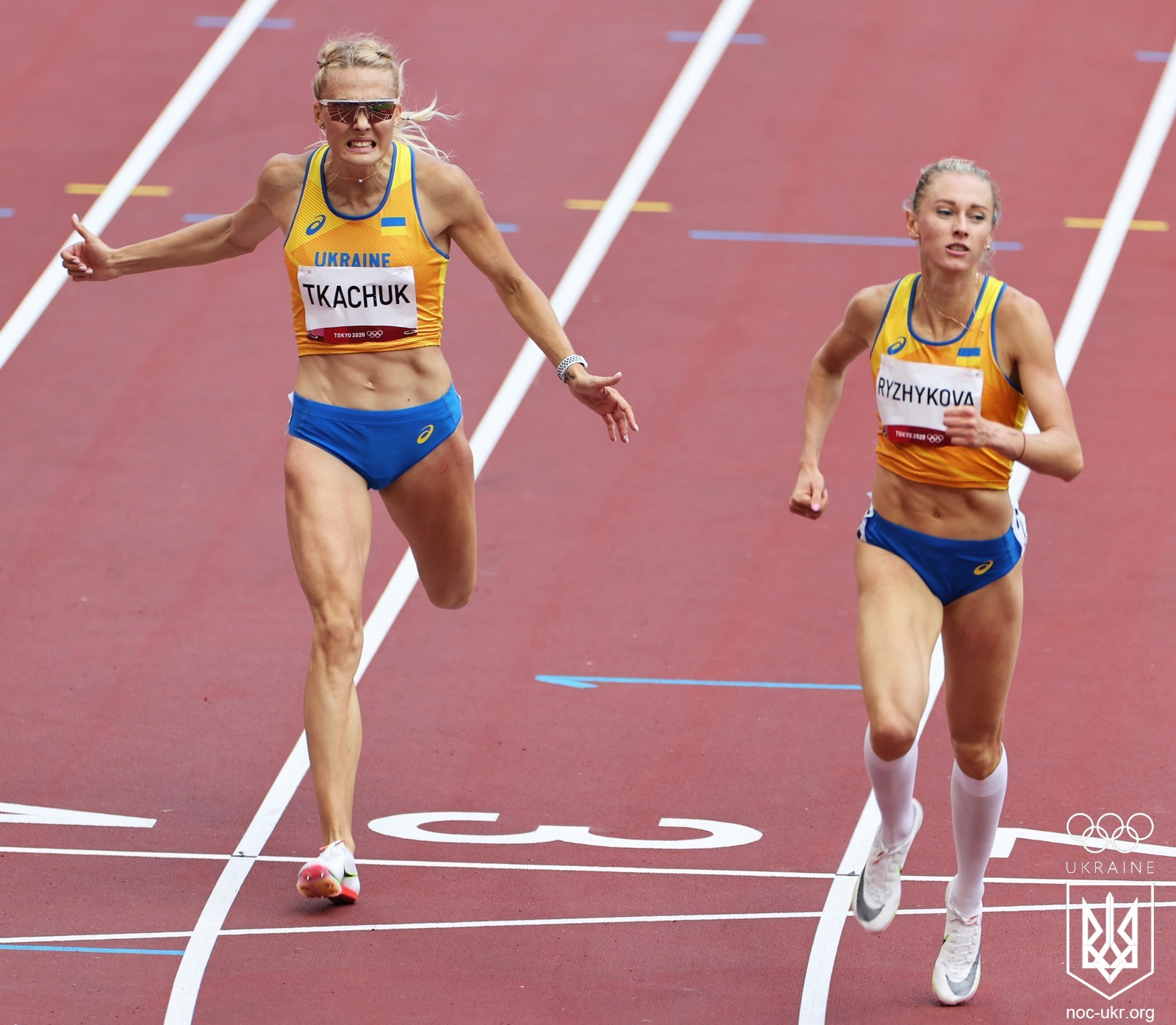
Anna Ryzhykova (right) and Viktoriya Tkachuk (left) of Ukraine finishing in fifth and sixth place in the final

Eight athletes from five nations competed in the final on 4 August 2021 at 9:00 (UTF+9) in the morning.

Knowing she had to run a world record, Muhammad was out fast clearing the first hurdle just ahead of McLaughlin and Bol. By the third hurdle, she had passed the athletes staggered to her outside. Muhammad kept the pressure up over each hurdle, with McLaughlin three lanes inside of her, watching her. Keeping pace, Bol was touching down just a fraction of a step behind McLaughlin. Those three separated from the rest of the field but kept the same pattern, Muhammad, McLaughlin, Bol over all ten hurdles. When she crossed the finish line, Muhammad had bettered the 6-week-old world record by almost a third of a second, 51.58. And McLaughlin had run faster from the last hurdle home to win, setting a new world record in 51.46. Bol was just barely behind the previous world record in 52.03, the #3 performer and #4 performance ever all in the same race.

Results of the final
Rank	Lane	Athlete	Nation	Reaction	Time	Notes
1st place, gold medalist(s)	4	Sydney McLaughlin	United States	0.163	51.46	WR
2nd place, silver medalist(s)	7	Dalilah Muhammad	United States	0.200	51.58	PB
3rd place, bronze medalist(s)	5	Femke Bol	Netherlands	0.165	52.03	AR
4	6	Janieve Russell	Jamaica	0.136	53.08	PB
5	2	Anna Ryzhykova	Ukraine	0.177	53.48	
6	3	Viktoriya Tkachuk	Ukraine	0.206	53.79	PB
7	9	Gianna Woodruff	Panama	0.235	55.84	
	8	Anna Cockrell	United States	0.167	DQ	TR 17.3.1
