= Chayenne da Silva =

Brazilian hurdler (born 2000)

Personal information
- Full name: Chayenne Pereira da Silva
- Born: 5 February 2000 (age 26) Nova Iguaçu, Brazil

Sport
- Sport: Athletics
- Event: 400 m hurdles
- Club: EMFCA
Medal record
Women's athletics
Representing Brazil
Pan American Games
Bronze medal – third place	2023 Santiago	4×400 m relay

Chayenne Pereira da Silva (born 5 February 2000) is a Brazilian athlete specialising in the 400 metres hurdles. She won a bronze medal at the 2021 South American Championships. She competed at the 2020 Summer Olympics.

At the 2023 Pan American Games, she was a member of the 4 × 400 m relay team that won bronze in the competition.

Her personal best in the event is 55.15 seconds set in São Paulo in 2021. This the current South American record.

== International competitions ==
Year	Competition	Venue	Position	Event	Notes
Representing Brazil
2017	World U18 Championships	Nairobi, Kenya	8th	400 m hurdles	62.17
2018	World U20 Championships	Tampere, Finland	18th (sf)	400 m hurdles	59.19
2018	World U20 Championships	Tampere, Finland	8th	4 × 400 m relay	3:34.55
2018	South American U23 Championships	Cuenca, Ecuador	2nd	400 m hurdles	59.21
2018	South American U23 Championships	Cuenca, Ecuador	2nd	4 × 400 m relay	3:42.38
2019	South American U20 Championships	Cali, Colombia	3rd	400 m hurdles	57.85
2019	South American U20 Championships	Cali, Colombia	1st	4 × 400 m relay	3:37.24
2019	Pan American U20 Championships	San José, Costa Rica	4th	100 m hurdles	57.55
2019	Pan American U20 Championships	San José, Costa Rica	4th	4 × 400 m relay	3:34.52
2021	South American Championships	Guayaquil, Ecuador	3rd	400 m hurdles	57.78
2021	South American Championships	Guayaquil, Ecuador	3rd	4 × 400 m relay	3:36.40
2021	Olympic Games	Tokyo, Japan	35th (h)	400 m hurdles	57.55
2021	Junior Pan American Games	Cali, Colombia	1st	400 m hurdles	55.97
2021	Junior Pan American Games	Cali, Colombia	1st	4 × 400 m relay	3:33.40
2022	Ibero-American Championships	La Nucía, Spain	5th	400 m hurdles	56.89
2022	Ibero-American Championships	La Nucía, Spain	2nd	4 × 400 m relay	3:32.50
2022	World Championships	Eugene, United States	36th (h)	400 m hurdles	59.46
2022	South American U23 Championships	Cascavel, Brazil	1st	400 m hurdles	57.51
2022	South American Games	Asunción, Paraguay	2nd	400 m hurdles	57.91
2023	South American Championships	São Paulo, Brazil	1st	400 m hurdles	55.90
2023	World Championships	Budapest, Hungary	31st (h)	400 m hurdles	56.25
2023	Pan American Games	Santiago, Chile	1st (h)	400 m hurdles	57.85^{1}
2024	Ibero-American Championships	Cuiabá, Brazil	3rd	400 m hurdles	56.22
2024	Olympic Games	Paris, France	17th (rep)	400 m hurdles	56.56
2025	South American Championships	Mar del Plata, Argentina	4th	400 m hurdles	59.70
2026	Ibero-American Championships	Lima, Peru	6th	400 m hurdles	59.34
2026	Pan American Championships	Medellín, Colombia	8th	400 m hurdles	57.40

^{1}Did not finish in the final
