= Viivi Lehikoinen =

Finnish hurdler (born 1999)

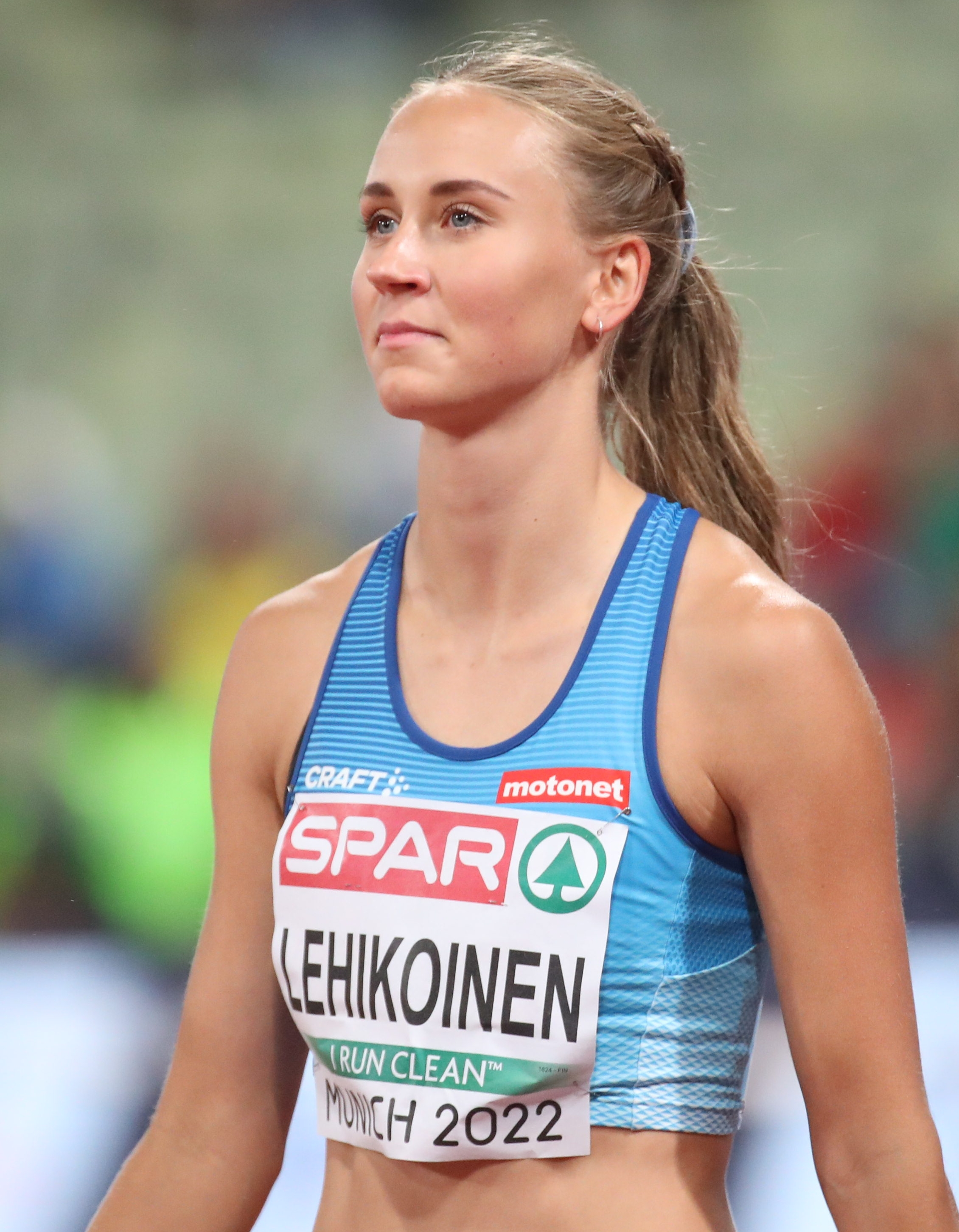
- Lehikoinen in 2022

Personal information
- Nationality: Finnish
- Born: 27 August 1999 (age 26)

Sport
- Sport: Athletics
- Event: 400 metres hurdles
- Coached by: Laurent Meuwly

Achievements and titles
- Personal best: 400 m hurdles: 54,40 (2023)
Medal record
European U20 Championships
| Bronze medal – third place | 2017 Grosseto | 400 m hurdles |
European U18 Championships
| Gold medal – first place | 2016 Tbilisi | 400 m hurdles |

Viivi Lehikoinen (born 27 August 1999) is a Finnish athlete. She competed in the women's 400 metres hurdles event at the 2020 Summer Olympics and at the 2022 World Championships.

Lehikoinen won a gold medal in the 400 metres hurdles at the 2016 European U18 Championships. In July 2017, at the age of 17, she won a bronze medal in the 400 metres hurdles at the 2017 European U20 Championships, breaking the Finnish under-20 record with a time of 56,49.

== Personal bests ==
| Event | Time | Venue | Date |
|---|---|---|---|
| 400 metres | 52,99 | Tampere, Finland | 28 August 2021 |
| 400 metres hurdles | 54,40 | Huelva, Spain | 6 June 2023 |

- All information from World Athletics profile.
