= 2025 World Athletics Championships – Women's 400 metres hurdles =

Women's 400 metres hurdles at the 2025 World Athletics Championships
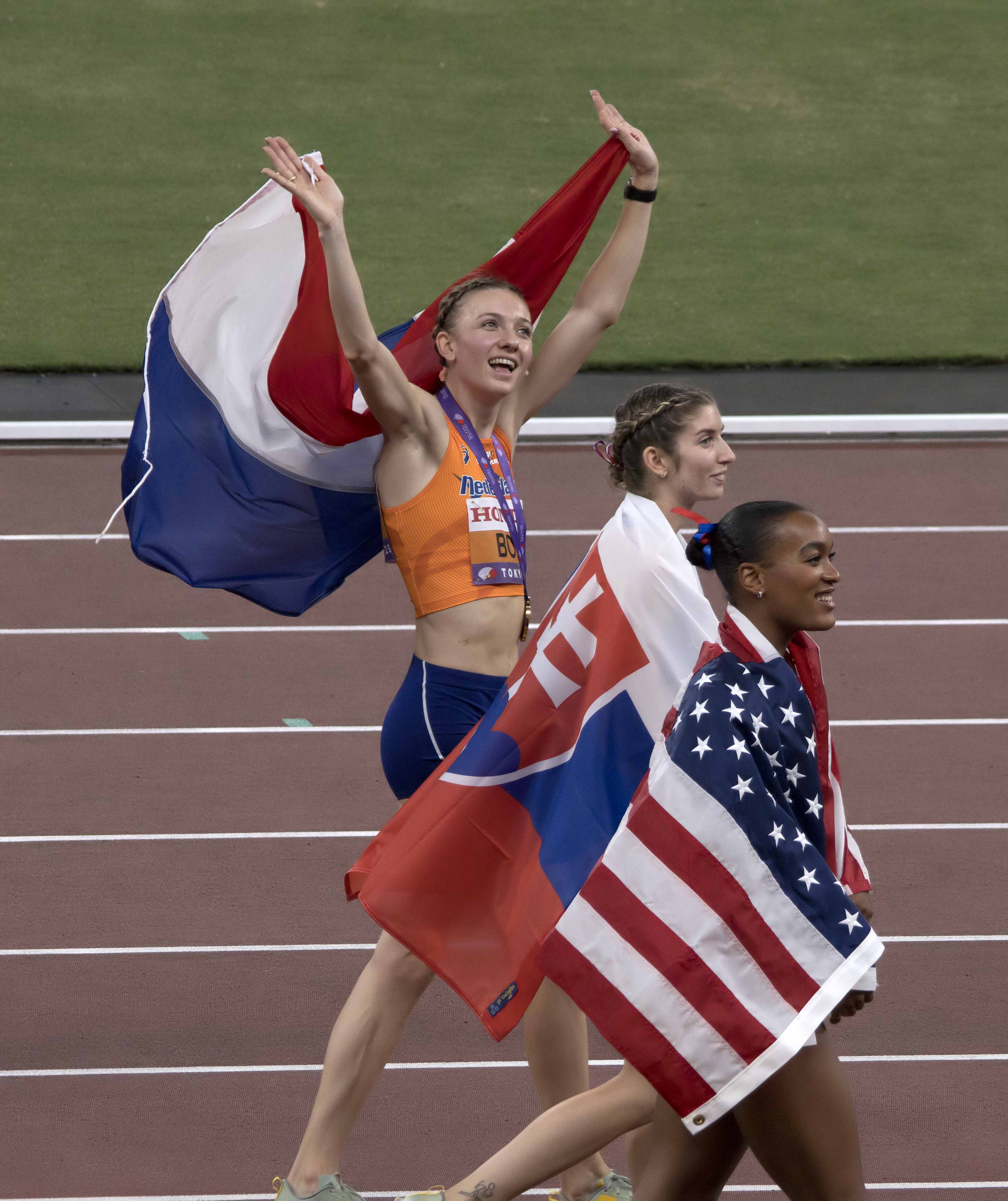
- Femke Bol, Emma Zapletalová, and Jasmine Jones after medalling in the 400 metres hurdles final
- Venue: National Stadium
- Location: Tokyo, Japan
- Dates: 15 September 2025 (round 1); 17 September 2025 (semi-finals); 19 September 2025 (final)
- Competitors: 41 from 29 nations
- Winning time: 51.54 s

Medalists
gold medal	Femke Bol	Netherlands
silver medal	Jasmine Jones	United States
bronze medal	Emma Zapletalová	Slovakia

The women's 400 metres hurdles at the 2025 World Athletics Championships was held over three rounds at the National Stadium in Tokyo, Japan, on 15, 17, and 19 September 2025. It was the twenty-first time that this event was contested at the World Athletics Championships. Athletes could qualify by running the entry standard of 54.65 s or faster, by winning selected competitions, or by their position on the World Athletics Rankings.

Forty-one athletes from twenty-nine nations competed in round 1, where twenty-four athletes advanced to the next round. In the semi-finals, eight athletes advanced to the final, including Gianna Woodruff of Panama in a South American record of 52.66 s and Naomi Van den Broeck of Belgium in a national record of 53.65 s; Fatoumata Binta Diallo of Portugal set a national record of 54.45 s, but she did not advance.

In the final, Femke Bol of the Netherlands, who was unbeaten over the hurdles in 2025, won in a world leading time of 51.54 s, successfully defending her 2023 title. She was followed by Jasmine Jones of the United States in second place in 52.08 s and Emma Zapletalová of Slovakia in third place in a national record of 53.00 s.

== Background ==
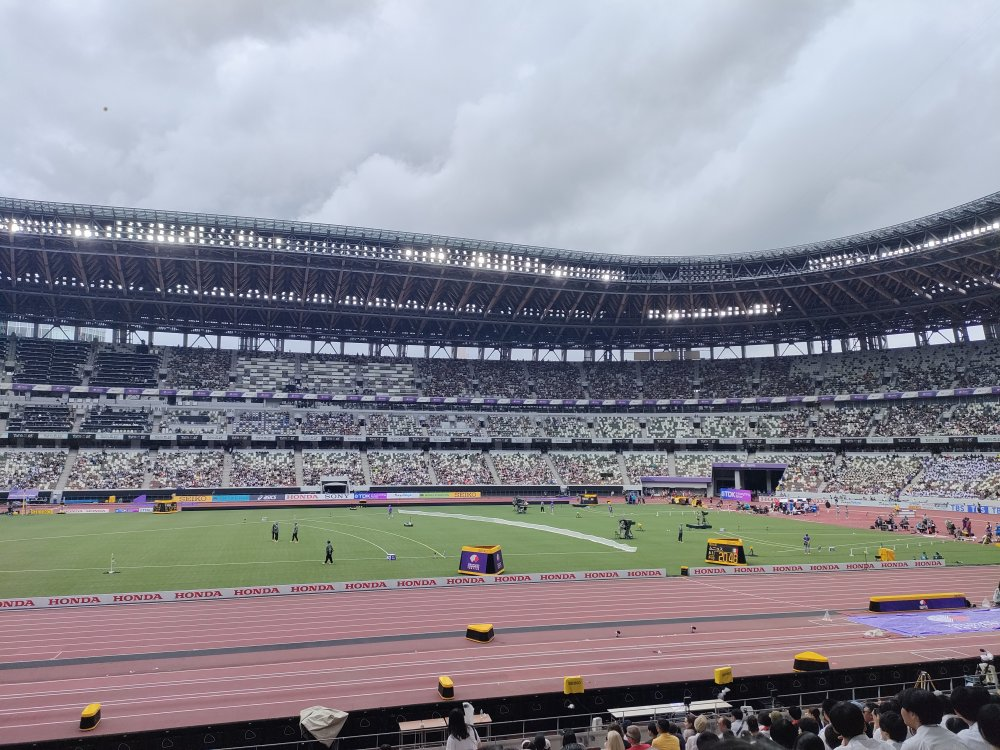
The Japan National Stadium in Tokyo in September 2025

In the 400 metres hurdles, athletes run one lap on a 400-metre track while jumping over ten hurdles. The women's championship for this event was introduced in 1980 and had been contested twenty times at the World Athletics Championships before 2025. The track events of the 2025 World Athletics Championships were held at the National Stadium in Tokyo, Japan, which was opened in 2020 and had a capacity of 68,000 seats.

Before the 2025 edition, Sydney McLaughlin-Levrone of the United States held the world record of 50.37 s set at the 2024 Summer Olympics and the championship record of 50.68 s set at the 2022 World Athletics Championships and Femke Bol of the Netherlands had run the world leading time of 51.91 s during the Kamila Skolimowska Memorial on 16 August 2025. Bol was the defending champion after winning the title in 2023.

Nicole Jeffery of World Athletics remarked that Bol had "looked virtually bulletproof" and "put together a perfect season over the quarter-sticks, winning eight successive races in Rabat, Hengelo, Stockholm, Monaco, London, Budapest, Silesia and Zurich before arriving in Tokyo." Mitch Phillips of Reuters said that "In the absence of Olympic champion and world record-holder Sydney McLaughlin-Levrone (...) Bol was red-hot favourite" to win gold.

Global records before the 2025 World Athletics Championships
Record	Athlete (nation)	Time	Location	Date
World record	Sydney McLaughlin-Levrone (USA)	50.37	Paris, France	8 August 2024
Championship record	Sydney McLaughlin-Levrone (USA)	50.68	Eugene, United States	24 July 2022
World leading	Femke Bol (NED)	51.91	Chorzów, Poland	16 August 2025

Area records before the 2025 World Athletics Championships
Record	Athlete (nation)	Time	Location	Date
African record	Nezha Bidouane (MAR)	52.90	Sevilla, Spain	25 August 1999
Asian record	Kemi Adekoya (BHR)	53.09	Budapest, Hungary	24 August 2023
European record	Femke Bol (NED)	50.95	La Chaux-de-Fonds, Switzerland	14 July 2024
North, Central American and Caribbean record	Sydney McLaughlin-Levrone (USA)	50.37 WR	Paris, France	8 August 2024
Oceanian record	Debbie Flintoff-King (AUS)	53.17	Seoul, South Korea	28 September 1988
South American record	Gianna Woodruff (PAN)	53.69	Eugene, United States	20 July 2022

== Qualification ==
For the women's 400 metres hurdles, the qualification period was from 1 August 2024 to 24 August 2025. Athletes could qualify by running the entry standard of 54.65 s or faster, by winning the area championship of their continent, by wild card for the 2023 World Champion or the 2025 Diamond League winner, or by their position on the World Athletics Rankings for this event. There was a target number of forty athletes. A final entry list with forty-five athletes from twenty-nine nations was issued on 4 September 2025.

== Results ==
=== Round 1 ===
Forty-one athletes of twenty-nine nations competed in the five heats of round 1 on 15 September in the morning, starting at 11:20 (UTC+9). Twenty-four athletes, the first four athletes in each heat (Q) and the next four fastest athletes overall (q), qualified for the semi-finals. Among the advancing athletes were Jasmine Jones of the United States, who ran a season's best (SB) in the third heat, Shiann Salmon of Jamaica who ran a season's best in the fourth heat, and Alice Muraro of Italy and Mo Jiadie of China, who both ran personal bests (PB) in the fifth heat.

Results of round 1
Rank	Heat	Athlete	Nation	Time	Notes
1	3	Jasmine Jones	United States	53.18	Q, SB
2	2	Anna Cockrell	United States	53.63	Q
3	2	Andrenette Knight	Jamaica	53.74	Q
4	1	Femke Bol	Netherlands	53.75	Q
5	4	Dalilah Muhammad	United States	53.80	Q
6	3	Emma Zapletalová	Slovakia	54.15	Q
7	4	Shiann Salmon	Jamaica	54.21	Q, SB
8	5	Alice Muraro	Italy	54.36	Q, PB
9	2	Fatoumata Binta Diallo	Portugal	54.54	Q
10	5	Emily Newnham	Great Britain & N.I.	54.59	Q
11	4	Gianna Woodruff	Panama	54.60	Q
12	5	Mo Jiadie	China	54.63	Q, PB
13	3	Amalie Iuel	Norway	54.65	Q
14	1	Ayomide Folorunso	Italy	54.67	Q
15	1	Naomi Van den Broeck	Belgium	54.70	Q
16	3	Elena Kelety	Germany	54.74	Q
17	2	Daniela Ledecká	Slovakia	54.86	Q
18	2	Eileen Demes	Germany	55.03	q
19	3	Paulien Couckuyt	Belgium	55.08	q
20	4	Rebecca Sartori	Italy	55.11	Q
21	1	Kemi Adekoya	Bahrain	55.15	Q
22	4	Sarah Carli	Australia	55.24	q
23	2	Tia-Adana Belle	Barbados	55.27	q
24	5	Zenéy van der Walt	South Africa	55.32	Q
25	3	Kristiina Halonen	Finland	55.42	
26	1	Hilla Uusimäki	Finland	55.52	
27	5	Savannah Sutherland	Canada	55.68	
28	5	Anna Gryc	Poland	55.73	
29	4	Lina Nielsen	Great Britain & N.I.	55.82	
30	5	Louise Maraval	France	55.84	
31	1	Michelle Smith	U.S. Virgin Islands	56.00	
32	4	Daniela Rojas Gutierrez	Costa Rica	56.08	
33	3	Sára Mátó	Hungary	56.11	
34	2	Grace Claxton	Puerto Rico	56.14	
35	1	Rogail Joseph	South Africa	56.20	
36	2	Moa Granat	Sweden	56.32	
37	4	Ashley Miller	Zimbabwe	56.35	
38	1	Alanah Yukich	Australia	56.68	
39	3	Daniela Fra	Spain	56.88	
40	1	Robyn Brown	Philippines	57.03	
41	5	Yanique Haye-Smith	Turks and Caicos Islands	58.48	

=== Semi-finals ===
Twenty-four athletes from sixteen nations competed in the three heats of the semi-finals on 17 September in the evening, starting at 21:03 (UTC+9). Eight athletes, the first two athletes in each heat (Q) and the next two fastest athletes overall (q), qualified for the final. In the first heat, Gianna Woodruff of Panama set a South American area record (AR) of 52.66 s, and Jasmine Jones of the United States and Kemi Adekoya of Bahrain both ran season's bests (SB), and where Woodruff and Jones qualified for the final, Adekoya did not advance. In the second heat, Naomi Van den Broeck of Belgium set a national record (NR) of 53.65 s, which made her advance, and Elena Kelety of Germany ran a personal best (PB), which was not fast enough for the next round. In the third heat, Shiann Salmon of Jamaica ran a season's best and advanced to the final, but Amalie Iuel of Norway, who ran a personal best, and Fatoumata Binta Diallo of Portugal, who set a national record (NR) of 54.45 s, both did not qualify for the final.

Results of the semi-finals
Rank	Heat	Athlete	Nation	Time	Notes
1	2	Femke Bol	Netherlands	52.31	Q
2	1	Gianna Woodruff	Panama	52.66	Q, AR
3	1	Jasmine Jones	United States	53.01	Q, SB
4	2	Dalilah Muhammad	United States	53.14	Q
5	1	Emma Zapletalová	Slovakia	53.22	q
6	3	Anna Cockrell	United States	53.28	Q
7	2	Naomi Van den Broeck	Belgium	53.65	q, NR
8	3	Shiann Salmon	Jamaica	54.03	Q, SB
9	1	Kemi Adekoya	Bahrain	54.04	SB
10	3	Amalie Iuel	Norway	54.28	PB
11	1	Andrenette Knight	Jamaica	54.35	
12	2	Ayomide Folorunso	Italy	54.37	
13	3	Fatoumata Binta Diallo	Portugal	54.45	NR
14	3	Alice Muraro	Italy	54.50	
15	2	Elena Kelety	Germany	54.61	PB
16	2	Emily Newnham	Great Britain & N.I.	54.64	
17	1	Paulien Couckuyt	Belgium	54.69	
18	3	Daniela Ledecká	Slovakia	54.94	
19	2	Sarah Carli	Australia	55.02	
20	3	Zenéy van der Walt	South Africa	55.06	
21	1	Mo Jiadie	China	55.11	
22	1	Rebecca Sartori	Italy	55.34	
23	2	Tia-Adana Belle	Barbados	55.83	
24	3	Eileen Demes	Germany	55.98	

=== Final ===
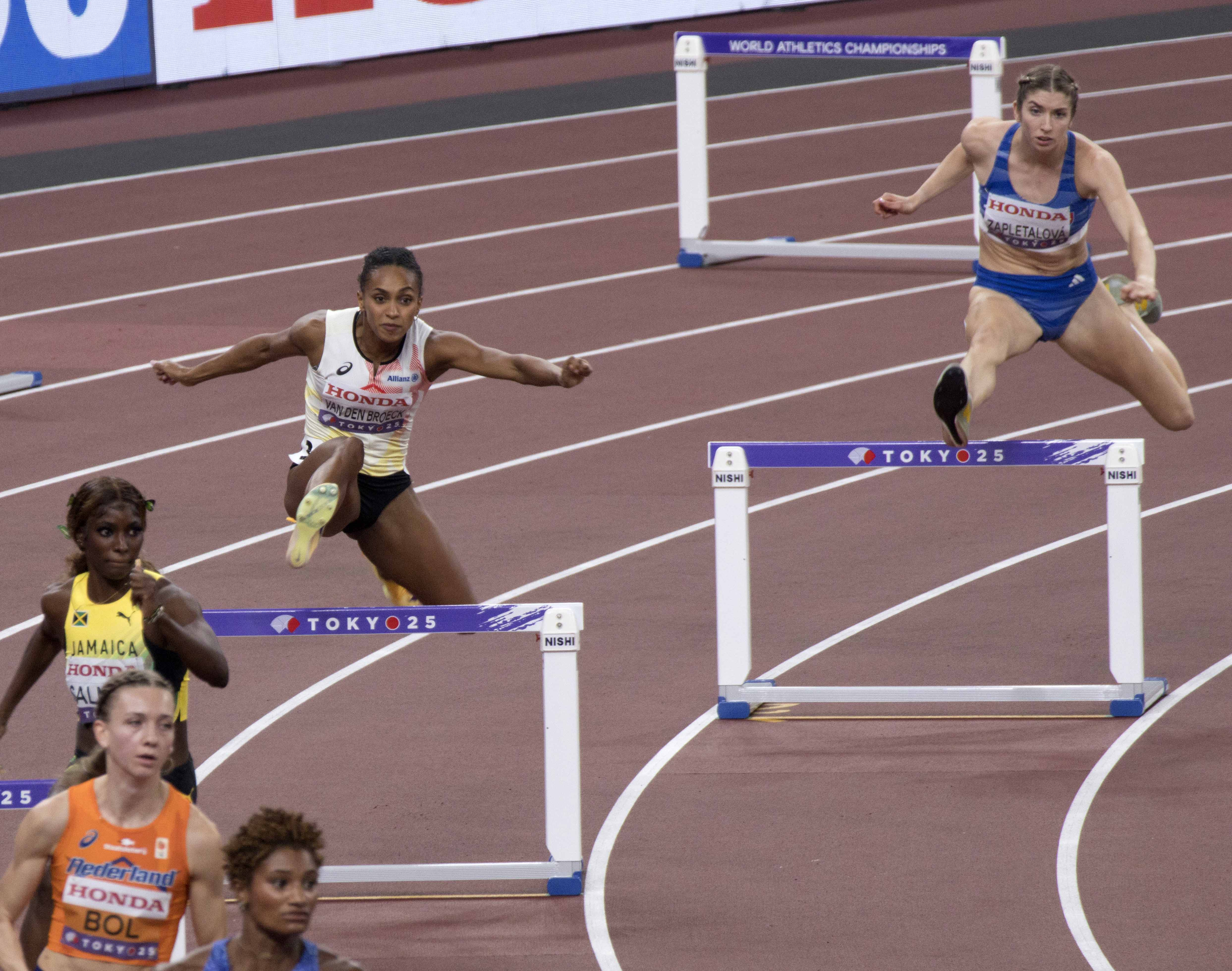
Athletes in the inside lanes in the final

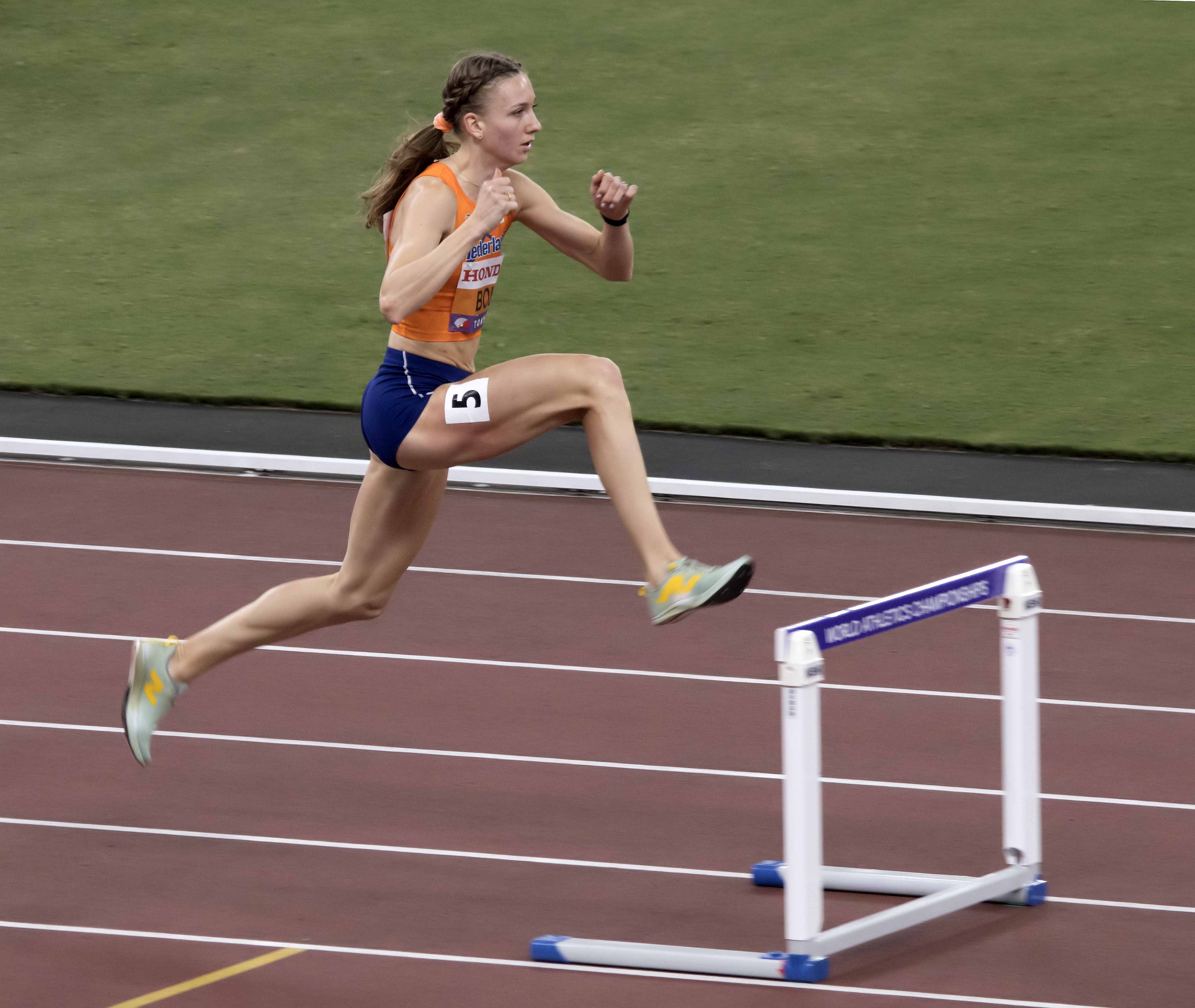
Femke Bol of the Netherlands in the final

Eight athletes from six nations competed in the final on 19 September in the evening, starting at 21:27 (UTC+9). After 100 m, Femke Bol of the Netherlands was leading the race, followed by Anna Cockrell, Dalilah Muhammad, and Jasmine Jones, all three of the United States. After 200 m, Bol and Cockrell held their relative positions, then came Jones and Gianna Woodruff of Panama, who each moved up one place, followed by Muhammad who moved down two places. After 300 m, Bol continued in the lead, Jones moved up into second position, Cockrell moved down into third position, and Emma Zapletalová of Slovakia moved up two places into fourth position. In the last 100 m, Bol and Jones held their relative positions, and Zapletalová passed Cockrell. The final was won by Bol in a world leading time (WL) of 51.54 s, successfully defending her 2023 title. Jones finished in second place in a personal best time (PB) of 52.08 s and Zapletalová finished third in a Slovak national record (NR) of 53.00 s.

Euan Crumley of Athletics Weekly wrote that "Femke Bol convincingly defended her world title" and that she "might make it look simple but a huge amount of hard work came to fruition as she lived up to being the favourite". Mitch Phillips of Reuters called Bol's performance "brilliant" and said that she "duly delivered a textbook performance". Esther Scholten of the Dutch newspaper Trouw wrote "It is not surprising, but how impressive is it that Femke Bol wins gold again?" as headline for her reporting.

In an interview, Bol said about the race: "At these world championships I had to keep my title. I am proud of myself and my team for doing it. This year we tried to change some things in training to get better at finishing the race. (...) I always try to keep focusing on my execution. I was focused on myself and running for my life until I made it through the line." Jones called her silver medal "not too shabby" and said: "I am really excited with that and my PR (personal record) too. I also ran a PB in the final in Paris, but the goal was a medal." Zapletalová said about the race: "Close to the finish I saw that I was close to being in a medal position. I just put all my power down to make my finish as strong as possible. I was not sure it was enough so I was shocked when I saw the results on the screen. It's a miracle to complete my world championships debut with this amazing bronze."

At the time, only Bol and her coach knew that the final was Bol's last 400 m hurdles race. In October 2025, Bol announced that she would switch to the 800 metres in 2026.

Results of the final
Rank	Lane	Athlete	Nation	Time	Notes
1st place, gold medalist(s)	5	Femke Bol	Netherlands	51.54	WL
2nd place, silver medalist(s)	7	Jasmine Jones	United States	52.08	PB
3rd place, bronze medalist(s)	2	Emma Zapletalová	Slovakia	53.00	NR
4	6	Anna Cockrell	United States	53.13	
5	8	Gianna Woodruff	Panama	53.34	
6	3	Naomi Van den Broeck	Belgium	53.70	
7	9	Dalilah Muhammad	United States	54.82	
8	4	Shiann Salmon	Jamaica	56.27	
