= 2013 World Youth Championships in Athletics – Girls' 400 metres hurdles =

Girls' 400 metres hurdles at the 2013 World Youth Championships in Athletics
- Venue: RSC Olimpiyskiy
- Dates: 10 July (heats); 11 July (semifinal); 13 July (final)
- Competitors: 35
- Winning time: 58.08 WYL

Medalists
| gold medal | Heleen Swanepoel | South Africa |
| silver medal | Tia-Adana Belle | Barbados |
| bronze medal | Lisa-Marie Jacoby | Germany |

The girls' 400 metres hurdles at the 2013 World Youth Championships in Athletics was held on 10–12 July.

== Medalists ==
| Gold | Silver | Bronze |
|---|---|---|
| Heleen Swanepoel; South Africa | Tia-Adana Belle; Barbados | Lisa-Marie Jacoby; Germany |

== Records ==
Prior to the competition, the following records were as follows.

| World Youth Best | Leslie Maxie (USA) | 55.20 | San Jose, United States | 9 June 1984 |
| Championship Record | Ebony Collins (USA) | 55.96 | Marrakesh, Morocco | 15 July 2005 |
| World Youth Leading | Helene Swanepoel (RSA) | 58.48 | Potchefstroom, South Africa | 25 May 2013 |

== Heats ==
Qualification rule: first 4 of each heat (Q) and the next 4 fastest (q) qualified.

=== Heat 1 ===
| Rank | Lane | Name | Nationality | Time | Notes |
|---|---|---|---|---|---|
| 1 | 3 | Tia-Adana Belle | Barbados | 59.29 | Q, SB |
| 2 | 8 | Eileen Demes | Germany | 59.67 | Q |
| 3 | 5 | Klerianne Casi | Puerto Rico | 59.85 | Q, PB |
| 4 | 7 | Tatiana Sánchez | Colombia | 1:00.79 | Q PB |
| 5 | 6 | Yang Qiao | China | 1:01.60 | q |
| 6 | 2 | Elisa Rovere | Italy | 1:04.07 | |
| 7 | 4 | Glory Onome Nathaniel | Nigeria | 1:07.06 | |

=== Heat 2 ===
| Rank | Lane | Name | Nationality | Time | Notes |
|---|---|---|---|---|---|
| 1 | 2 | Ewa Ochocka | Poland | 1:00.81 | Q |
| 2 | 5 | Rebecca Sartori | Italy | 1:01.05 | Q, PB |
| 3 | 7 | Andrenette Knight | Jamaica | 1:01.25 | Q |
| 4 | 4 | Mónika Zsiga | Hungary | 1:01.25 | Q, SB |
| 5 | 3 | D'Jane Kriedemann | South Africa | 1:01.26 | q |
| 6 | 8 | Yevheniya Sendetska | Ukraine | 1:04.28 | |
| 7 | 6 | Talia Thompson | Bahamas | 1:04.43 | |

=== Heat 3 ===
| Rank | Lane | Name | Nationality | Time | Notes |
|---|---|---|---|---|---|
| 1 | 5 | Helene Swanepoel | South Africa | 1:00.34 | Q |
| 2 | 6 | Stephanie Cho | Canada | 1:01.10 | Q |
| 3 | 2 | Kaho Horiike | Japan | 1:01.11 | Q |
| 4 | 8 | Kateryna Khasanova | Ukraine | 1:01.63 | Q, PB |
| 5 | 3 | Virginia Villalba | Ecuador | 1:01.74 | q |
| 6 | 7 | Lorena Almasan | Romania | 1:03.02 | |
| 7 | 4 | Busra Yildirim | Turkey | 1:03.82 | |

=== Heat 4 ===
| Rank | Lane | Name | Nationality | Time | Notes |
|---|---|---|---|---|---|
| 1 | 8 | Samantha Gonzalez | United States | 59.66 | Q, PB |
| 2 | 5 | Lisa-Marie Jacoby | Germany | 1:00.56 | Q |
| 3 | 2 | Julija Praprotnik | Slovenia | 1:01.72 | Q |
| 4 | 3 | Andreea Timofei | Romania | 1:02.98 | Q |
| 5 | 4 | Martina Samenková | Slovakia | 1:03.04 | |
| 6 | 6 | Mesha Newbold | Bahamas | 1:05.72 | |
| | 7 | Daisy Faith Akpofa | Nigeria | DQ | |

=== Heat 5 ===
| Rank | Lane | Name | Nationality | Time | Notes |
|---|---|---|---|---|---|
| 1 | 8 | Jana Reissová | Czech Republic | 59.11 | Q, PB |
| 2 | 6 | Nenah De Coninck | Belgium | 1:01.08 | Q |
| 3 | 2 | Briannill Cardona | Venezuela | 1:01.84 | Q, SB |
| 4 | 4 | Eva Pivk | Slovenia | 1:02.59 | Q |
| 5 | 5 | María Dolores Cobo | Ecuador | 1:02.95 | q |
| 6 | 7 | Anastasiia Volkova | Russia | 1:02.99 | |
| 7 | 3 | Lexi Aitken | Canada | 1:03.27 | |

== Semifinals ==
Qualification rule: first 2 of each heat (Q) plus the 2 fastest times (q) qualified.

=== Heat 1 ===
| Rank | Lane | Name | Nationality | Time | Notes |
|---|---|---|---|---|---|
| 1 | 4 | Heleen Swanepoel | South Africa | 59.02 | Q |
| 2 | 6 | Nenah De Coninck | Belgium | 59.73 | Q, PB |
| 3 | 5 | Samantha Gonzalez | United States | 59.74 | q |
| 4 | 7 | Tatiana Sánchez | Colombia | 59.75 | q, PB |
| 5 | 3 | Stephanie Cho | Canada | 1:00.05 | PB |
| 6 | 1 | Yang Qiao | China | 1:00.18 | PB |
| 7 | 2 | Virginia Elizabeth Villalba | Ecuador | 1:01.06 | SB |
| 8 | 8 | Briannill Cardona | Venezuela | 1:04.57 | |

=== Heat 2 ===
| Rank | Lane | Name | Nationality | Time | Notes |
|---|---|---|---|---|---|
| 1 | 6 | Eileen Demes | Germany | 59.87 | Q |
| 2 | 8 | Andrenette Knight | Jamaica | 1:00.16 | Q |
| 3 | 5 | Kaho Horiike | Japan | 1:00.39 | |
| 4 | 7 | Kateryna Khasanova | Ukraine | 1:01.70 | |
| 5 | 2 | Eva Pivk | Slovenia | 1:02.42 | PB |
| 6 | 3 | Rebecca Sartori | Italy | 1:03.25 | |
| 7 | 1 | Maria Dolores Cobo | Ecuador | 1:05.15 | |
| 8 | 4 | Jana Reissová | Czech Republic | 1:06.57 | |

=== Heat 3 ===
| Rank | Lane | Name | Nationality | Time | Notes |
|---|---|---|---|---|---|
| 1 | 6 | Tia-Adana Belle | Barbados | 58.81 | Q, PB |
| 2 | 4 | Lisa-Marie Jacoby | Germany | 59.12 | Q |
| 3 | 3 | Ewa Ochocka | Poland | 59.88 | PB |
| 4 | 5 | Klerianne Casi | Puerto Rico | 1:01.26 | |
| 5 | 2 | Djane Kriedemann | South Africa | 1:01.47 | |
| 6 | 7 | Mónika Zsiga | Hungary | 1:01.80 | |
| 7 | 1 | Andreea Timofei | Romania | 1:02.74 | |
| 8 | 8 | Julija Praprotnik | Slovenia | 1:07.59 | |

== Final ==
.

| Rank | Lane | Name | Nationality | Time | Notes |
|---|---|---|---|---|---|
| 1st place, gold medalist(s) | 4 | Heleen Swanepoel | South Africa | 58.08 | WYL |
| 2nd place, silver medalist(s) | 6 | Tia-Adana Belle | Barbados | 58.42 | PB |
| 3rd place, bronze medalist(s) | 3 | Lisa-Marie Jacoby | Germany | 58.75 | PB |
| 4 | 5 | Eileen Demes | Germany | 58.92 | PB |
| 5 | 1 | Samantha Gonzalez | United States | 59.74 | |
| 6 | 2 | Tatiana Sánchez | Colombia | 1:00.13 | |
| 7 | 7 | Nenah De Coninck | Belgium | 1:00.61 | |
| 8 | 8 | Andrenette Knight | Jamaica | 1:02.22 | |
