= 2023 World Athletics Championships – Women's 400 metres hurdles =

Women's 400 metres hurdles at the 2023 World Athletics Championships
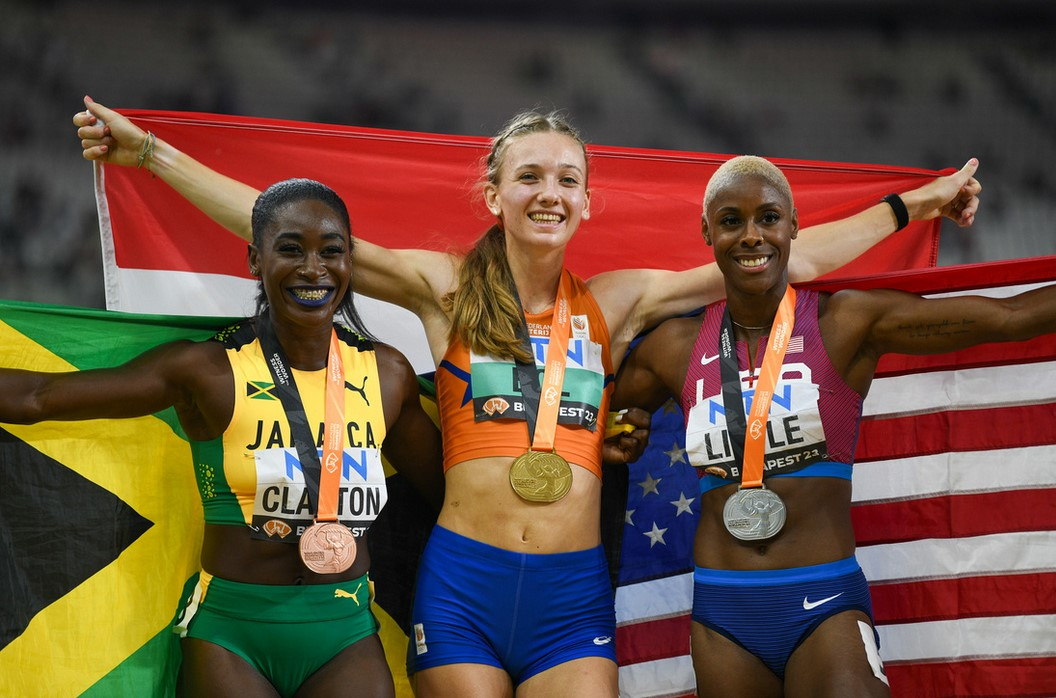
- Medalists Rushell Clayton (bronze), Femke Bol (gold), and Shamier Little (silver) after the final
- Venue: National Athletics Centre
- Location: Budapest, Hungary
- Dates: 21 August 2023 (round 1); 22 August 2023 (semi-finals); 24 August 2023 (final)
- Competitors: 41 from 30 nations
- Winning time: 51.70 s

Medalists
gold medal	Femke Bol	Netherlands
silver medal	Shamier Little	United States
bronze medal	Rushell Clayton	Jamaica

The women's 400 metres hurdles at the 2023 World Athletics Championships was held over three rounds at the National Athletics Centre in Budapest, Hungary, from 21 to 24 August 2023. It was the twentieth time that this event was contested at the World Athletics Championships. Athletes could qualify by running the entry standard of 54.90 seconds or faster, by winning selected competitions, or by their position on the World Athletics Rankings.

Forty-one athletes from thirty nations competed in round 1, where twenty-four athletes advanced to the semi-finals and Kemi Adekoya of Bahrain set an Asian record of 53.56 s. In the semi-finals, eight athletes advanced to the final, Adekoya improved her Asian record to 53.39 s, and Ayomide Folorunso of Italy set a national record of 53.89 s.

In the final, Femke Bol of the Netherlands "dominated" the race, where she had a "wide lead" and finished first in 51.70 s, winning her first global title. She was followed by Shamier Little of the United States in second place in 52.80 s and Rushell Clayton of Jamaica in third place in 52.81 s. Outside the medals, Adekoya further improved her Asian record to 53.09 s.

== Background ==
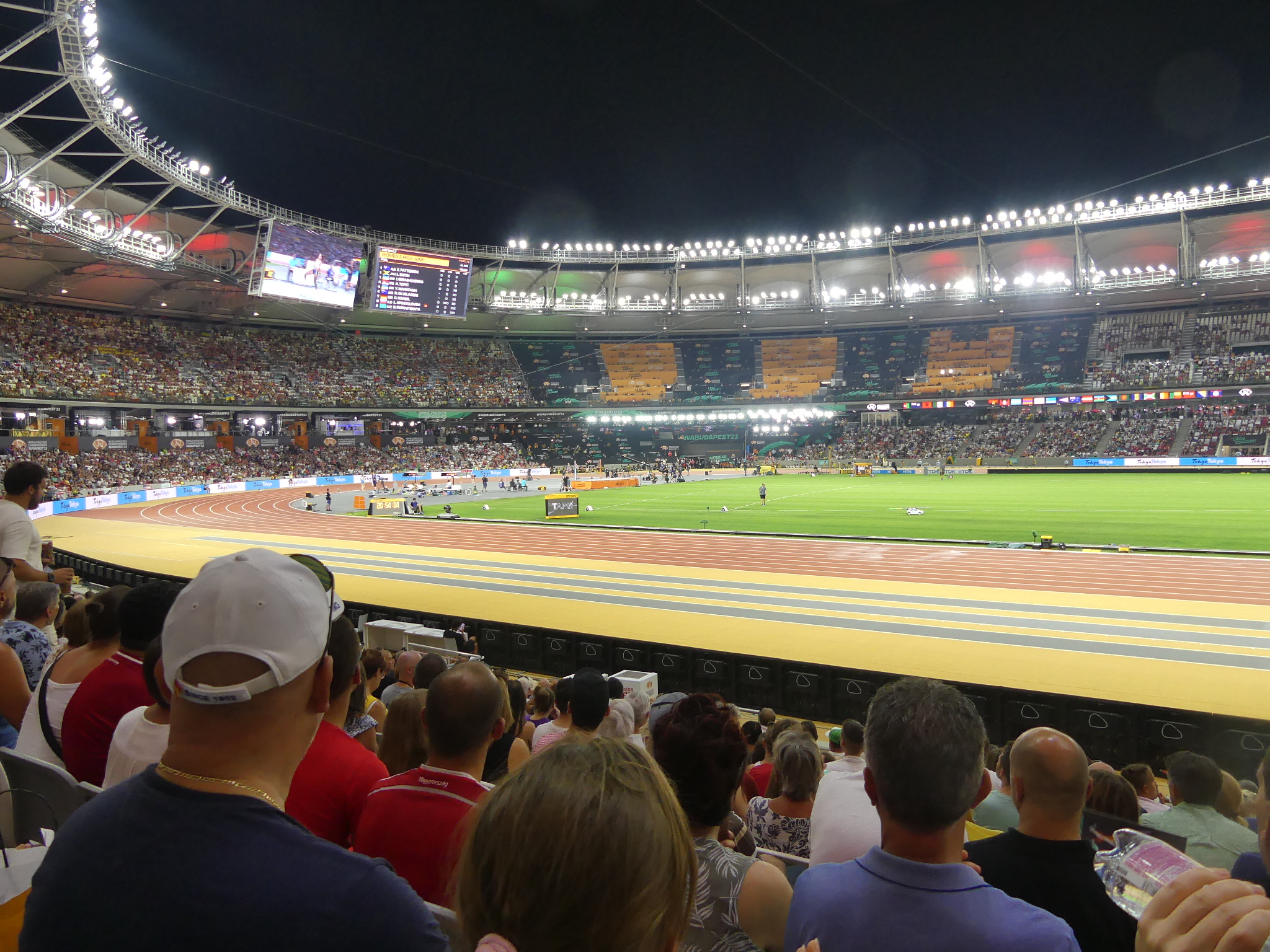
The National Athletics Centre in Budapest, Hungary, during August 2023

In the 400 metres hurdles, athletes run one lap on a 400-metre track while jumping over ten hurdles. The women's world championship in this event was introduced in 1980 and the event had been contested nineteen times at the World Athletics Championships before 2023. The world championships had been two years apart since 1991, but the 2021 edition was postponed one year due to the postponement of the 2020 Summer Olympics to 2021, so there were world championships in the consecutive years 2022 and 2023.

The track events of the 2023 World Athletics Championships were held at the National Athletics Centre in Budapest, Hungary, which had a capacity of 35,000 seats. At the start of the 2023 edition, the world record and championship record in the women's 400 metres hurdles was 50.68 s, set by Sydney McLaughlin-Levrone of the United States at the 2022 World Athletics Championships on 22 July 2022, and the world leading performance of 2023 was 51.45 s, run by Femke Bol of the Netherlands at the 2023 London Athletics Meet on 23 July 2023. McLaughlin-Levrone chose not to defend her 2022 title.

Global records before the 2023 World Athletics Championships
Record	Athlete (nation)	Time	Location	Date
World record	Sydney McLaughlin-Levrone (USA)	50.68	Eugene, United States	22 July 2022
Championship record	Sydney McLaughlin-Levrone (USA)	50.68	Eugene, United States	22 July 2022
World leading	Femke Bol (NED)	51.45	London, United Kingdom	23 July 2023

Area records before the 2023 World Athletics Championships
Record	Athlete (nation)	Time	Location	Date
African record	Nezha Bidouane (MAR)	52.90	Seville, Spain	25 August 1999
Asian record	Han Qing (CHN)	53.96	Beijing, China	9 September 1993
Asian record	Song Yinglan (CHN)	53.96	Guangzhou, China	17 November 2001
European record	Femke Bol (NED)	51.45	London, United Kingdom	23 July 2023
North, Central American and Caribbean record	Sydney McLaughlin-Levrone (USA)	50.68 WR	Eugene, United States	22 July 2022
Oceanian record	Debbie Flintoff-King (AUS)	53.17	Seoul, South Korea	28 September 1988
South American record	Gianna Woodruff (PAN)	53.69	Eugene, United States	20 July 2022

== Qualification ==
For this event, athletes could qualify by achieving the entry standard of 54.90 seconds during the qualification period from 31 July 2022 to 30 July 2023, by winning their continental championship in 2021–2023, by wild card for winning the 2022 World Championships or the 2022 Diamond League, or by their position on the World Athletics Rankings on 30 July 2023. Nations without qualified athletes in all events could select one unqualified athlete for one track event. There was a target number of 40 athletes with a maximum of three athletes per nation, or four athletes per nation in the case of a wild card. A final entry list with forty-four athletes from thirty nations was issued on 10 August 2023.

== Results ==
=== Round 1 ===
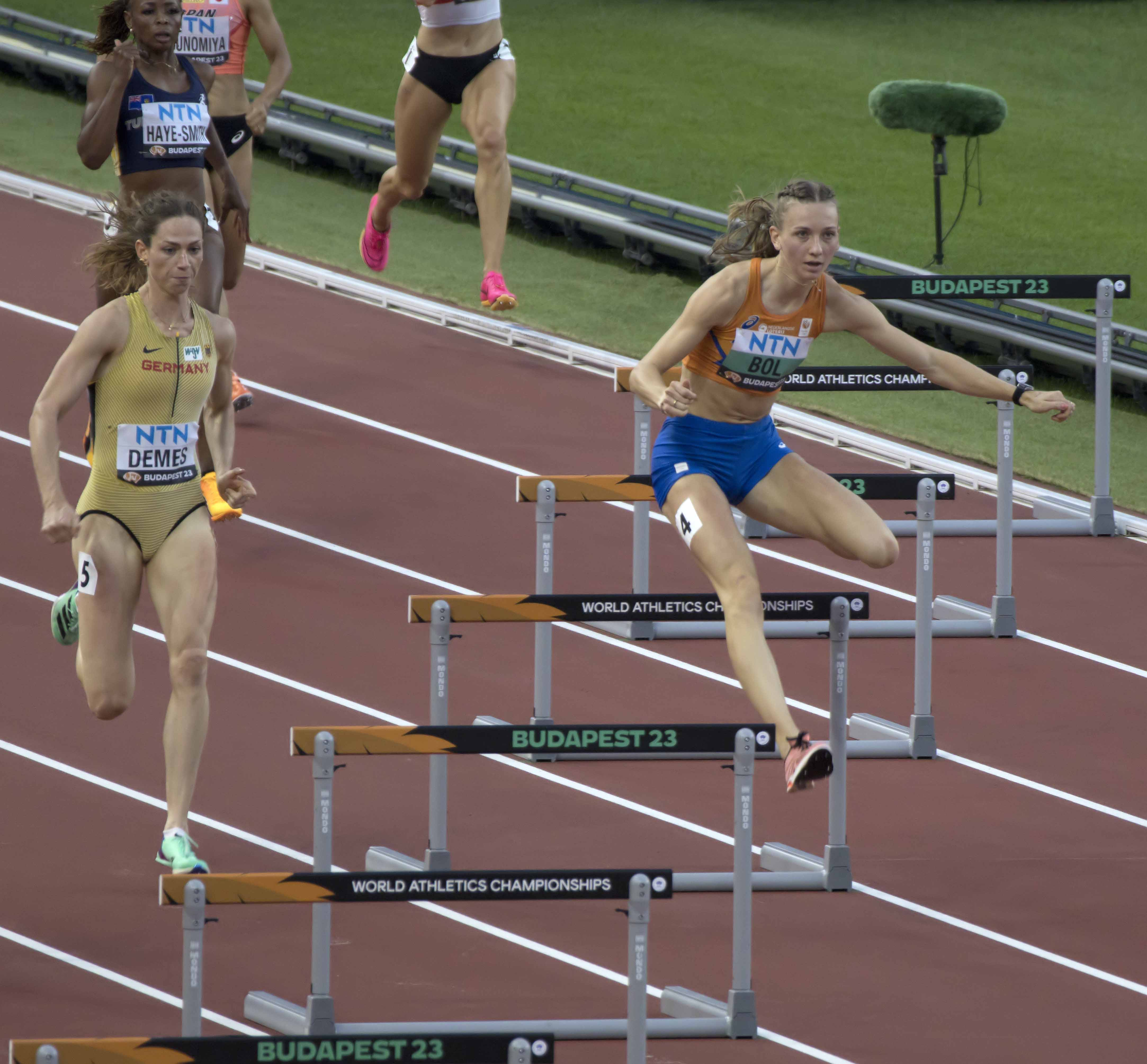
Yanique Haye-Smith (back left), Eileen Demes (front left), and Femke Bol (right) during the first-round heats

Forty-one athletes from thirty nations competed in the five heats of the first round on 21 August in the evening, starting at 18:50 (UTC+2). The first four athletes in each heat (Q) and the next four fastest athletes overall (q) qualified for the semi-finals. In the third heat, Kemi Adekoya of Bahrain set an Asian record (AR) of 53.56 s. And in the fourth heat, Eileen Demes of Germany also set a personal best time.

Results of round 1
Rank	Heat	Athlete	Nation	Time	Notes
1	4	Femke Bol	Netherlands	53.39	Q
2	3	Kemi Adekoya	Bahrain	53.56	Q, AR
3	1	Rushell Clayton	Jamaica	53.97	Q
4	3	Andrenette Knight	Jamaica	54.21	Q
5	1	Dalilah Muhammad	United States	54.21	Q
6	5	Jessie Knight	Great Britain & N.I.	54.27	Q
7	3	Ayomide Folorunso	Italy	54.30	Q
8	5	Shamier Little	United States	54.40	Q
9	1	Carolina Krafzik	Germany	54.53	Q
10	2	Janieve Russell	Jamaica	54.53	Q
11	1	Viivi Lehikoinen	Finland	54.65	Q
12	2	Anna Cockrell	United States	54.68	Q
13	5	Anna Ryzhykova	Ukraine	54.70	Q
14	1	Rebecca Sartori	Italy	54.82	q, PB
15	3	Cathelijn Peeters	Netherlands	54.95	Q
16	4	Viktoriya Tkachuk	Ukraine	55.05	Q
17	5	Nikoleta Jíchová	Czech Republic	55.10	Q
18	4	Hanne Claes	Belgium	55.13	Q
19	5	Noura Ennadi	Morocco	55.21	q
20	3	Zenéy van der Walt	South Africa	55.21	q
21	4	Line Kloster	Norway	55.23	Q
22	4	Eileen Demes	Germany	55.29	q, PB
23	2	Gianna Woodruff	Panama	55.31	Q
24	4	Sarah Carli	Australia	55.76	
25	2	Savannah Sutherland	Canada	55.85	Q
26	4	Fatoumata Binta Diallo	Portugal	56.03	
27	1	Yasmin Giger	Switzerland	56.16	
28	5	Dimitra Gnafaki	Greece	56.18	SB
29	5	Brooke Overholt	Canada	56.20	
30	1	Janka Molnár	Hungary	56.21	
31	2	Chayenne da Silva	Brazil	56.25	
32	2	Eleonora Marchiando	Italy	56.27	
33	3	Zurian Hechavarría	Cuba	56.43	
34	3	Moa Granat	Sweden	56.61	
35	2	Robyn Brown	Philippines	56.83	
36	5	Agata Zupin	Slovenia	57.62	
37	2	Ami Yamamoto	Japan	57.76	
38	3	Lena Pressler	Austria	57.90	
39	4	Eri Utsunomiya	Japan	57.98	
40	4	Yanique Haye-Smith	Turks and Caicos Islands	1:00.08	
41	1	Portia Bing	New Zealand	1:06.97	

=== Semi-finals ===
Twenty-four athletes from sixteen nations competed in the three heats of the semi-finals on 22 August in the evening, starting at 20:25 (UTC+2). The first two athletes in each heat (Q) and the next two fastest athletes overall (q) qualified for the final. In the third heat, Kemi Adekoya set an Asian record (AR), her second at these championships, of 53.39 s, and Ayomide Folorunso set an Italian record (NR) of 53.89 s.

Results of the semi-finals
Rank	Heat	Athlete	Nation	Time	Notes
1	3	Shamier Little	United States	52.81	Q, SB
2	2	Femke Bol	Netherlands	52.95	Q
3	1	Rushell Clayton	Jamaica	53.30	Q, PB
4	3	Kemi Adekoya	Bahrain	53.39	Q, AR
5	1	Anna Cockrell	United States	53.63	Q, PB
6	3	Janieve Russell	Jamaica	53.69	q
7	2	Andrenette Knight	Jamaica	53.72	Q
8	3	Ayomide Folorunso	Italy	53.89	q, NR
9	2	Dalilah Muhammad	United States	54.19	
10	2	Anna Ryzhykova	Ukraine	54.42	SB
11	1	Viivi Lehikoinen	Finland	54.48	
12	1	Jessie Knight	Great Britain & N.I.	54.51	
13	2	Carolina Krafzik	Germany	54.58	
14	3	Cathelijn Peeters	Netherlands	54.63	
15	1	Gianna Woodruff	Panama	54.71	
16	3	Savannah Sutherland	Canada	54.99	
17	2	Nikoleta Jíchová	Czech Republic	55.01	
18	1	Noura Ennadi	Morocco	55.15	
19	1	Viktoriya Tkachuk	Ukraine	55.43	
20	2	Line Kloster	Norway	55.43	
21	2	Zenéy van der Walt	South Africa	55.49	
22	1	Rebecca Sartori	Italy	55.98	
23	3	Hanne Claes	Belgium	56.06	
24	3	Eileen Demes	Germany	56.71	

=== Final ===
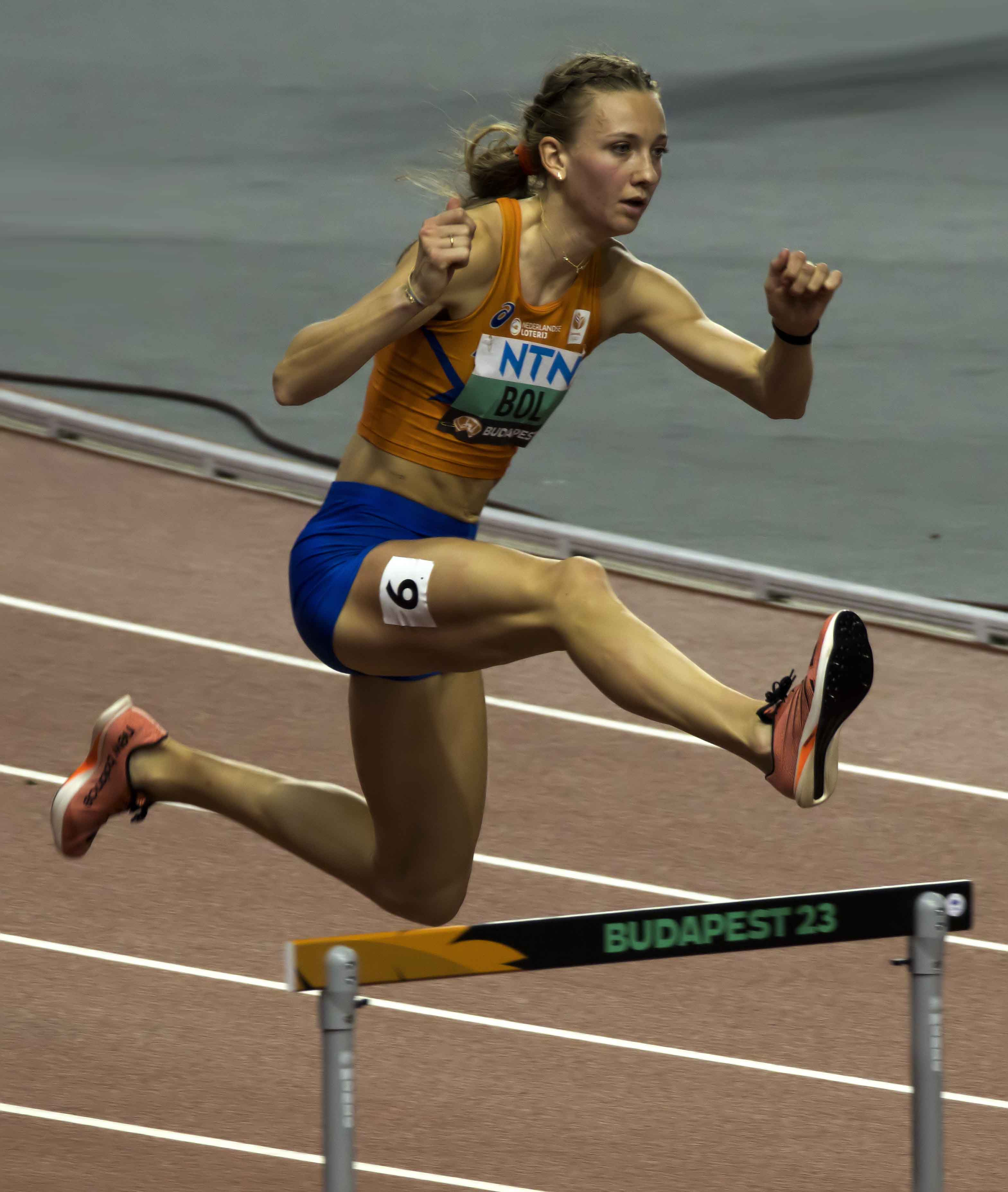
Femke Bol of the Netherlands during the final

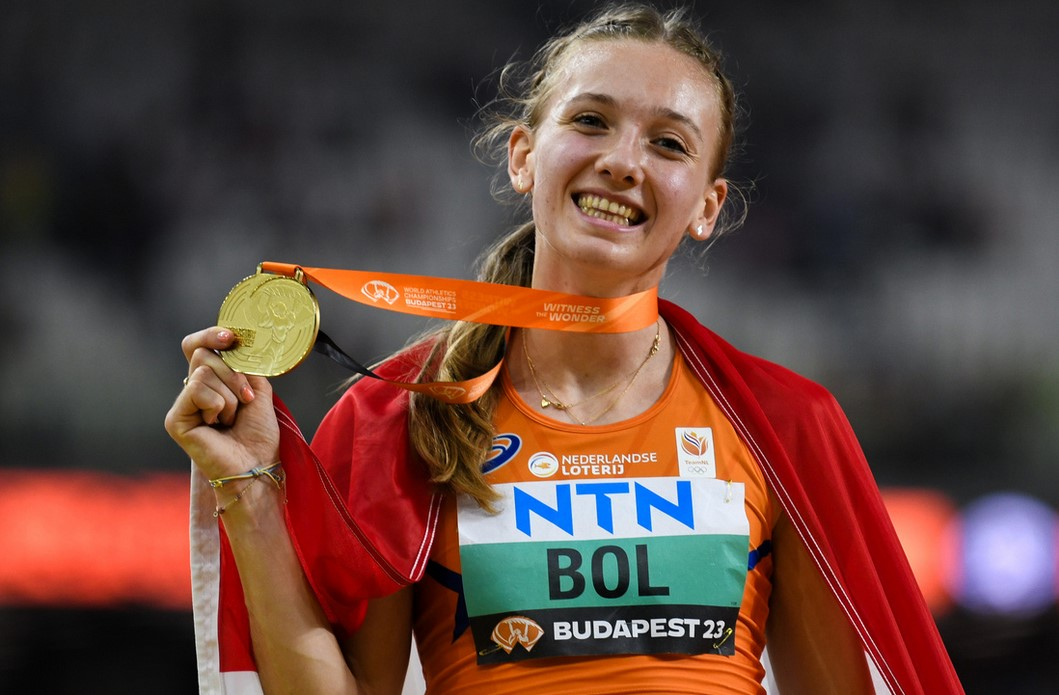
Femke Bol of the Netherlands with her gold medal

Eight athletes from five nations competed in the final on 24 August in the evening, starting at 21:49 (UTC+2). Femke Bol of the Netherlands started to move ahead of the other athletes from around 200 metres into the race, and she was several metres ahead of the rest of the field at the finish line. Bol won the gold medal in 51.70 s, Shamier Little of the United States won the silver medal in a season's best (SB) of 52.80 s, and Rushell Clayton won the bronze medal in a personal best time (PB) of 52.81 s. Outside the medals, Kemi Adekoya set an Asian record (AR), her third at these championships, of 53.09 s.

Euan Crumley of Athletics Weekly wrote that Bol "dominated her way to the first global title of her career". Pat Graham of the Associated Press reported that "The Dutch standout opened a wide lead and never looked back for a runaway win" and that it was "the second-fastest time of her career". Lori Ewing of Reuters wrote that "It was a hugely satisfying win for Bol, who was in tears after falling metres from the line when racing for gold in the 4x400m mixed relay on the opening night of the championships." Mike Rowbottom of World Athletics referred to the relay mishap and hurdles victory as "The fall and rise of Femke Bol".

Afterwards, the three medallists were interviewed about the race. Bol said: "I took the first few hurdles fast and then I could run my rhythm. I think I have just had the best first 200 metres ever. Then I just needed to finish the race which I could do easily." Little said: "I feel as if the hard work has paid off. This will really boost my confidence because I know that I am medal-worthy." Clayton said: "It was the best run of my life. When I won the bronze medal in Doha that was an easier run, I can tell you. Now all the ladies were on fire. I knew Femke would be in front of us but the others would be close to each other so I just focused on myself. I needed that medal."

Results of the final
Rank	Lane	Athlete	Nation	Time	Notes
1st place, gold medalist(s)	6	Femke Bol	Netherlands	51.70	
2nd place, silver medalist(s)	5	Shamier Little	United States	52.80	SB
3rd place, bronze medalist(s)	8	Rushell Clayton	Jamaica	52.81	PB
4	7	Kemi Adekoya	Bahrain	53.09	AR
5	9	Anna Cockrell	United States	53.34	PB
6	2	Ayomide Folorunso	Italy	54.19	
7	3	Janieve Russell	Jamaica	54.28	
8	4	Andrenette Knight	Jamaica	55.20	
