= Dimitra Gnafaki =

Greek athlete (born 1997)

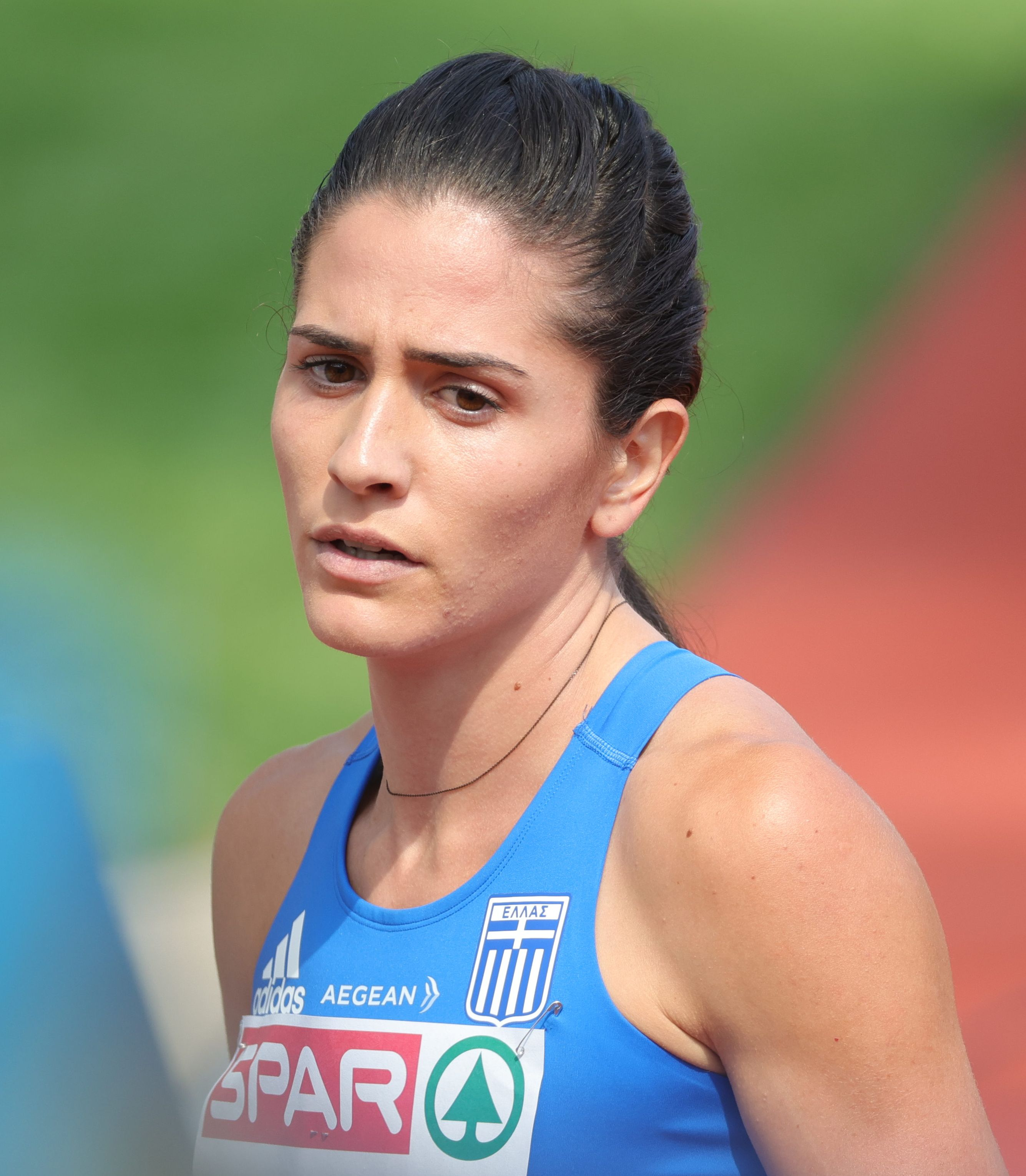

Personal information
- Nationality: Greek
- Born: 9 July 1997 (age 29)

Sport
- Sport: Athletics
- Event: 400m hurdles
- Club: Panathinaikos

Achievements and titles
- Personal bests: 400m hurdles: 56.14 (Munich, 2022); 400m: 54.50 (Chania, 2021)

Dimitra Gnafaki (born 9 July 1997) is a Greek track and field athlete. She is a multiple-time Greek national champion and twice Balkan champion over 400 metres hurdles. She represented Greece at the 2023 World Athletics Championships.

== Career ==
Gnafaki attended Gymnastics Academy in Serres before turning her focus fully to athletics and the 400m hurdles. She had her first international experience in 2016 at the 2016 World U20 Athletics Championships in Bydgoszcz. She then accepted a scholarship to attend the University of Akron, before returning to Greece to base herself in Chania, Crete.

In 2021, she ran 57.00 to win the 2021 Balkan Athletics Championships in Serbia, the time placed her fourth on the all-time Greek list for the 400m hurdles. However, she tested positive for COVID-19 at the championships and had to stay in Belgrade for an extended period according to the regulations.

The following year she won the Greek national title over 400m hurdles for the third time. She competed at the 2022 European Athletics Championships in Munich, Germany and ran a new personal best time of 56.14 seconds.

In July 2023, she won the Balkan Championships in Kraljevo with time of 56.45 seconds for the 400 metres hurdles. She was selected for the 2023 World Athletics Championships in Budapest in August 2023 and ran a seasons best time of 56.18. She won her fourth consecutive Greek national title in the 400m hurdles in 2023.

She ran 56.62 seconds for the 400 metres hurdles at the 2024 European Athletics Championships in Rome, Italy but did not proceed to the semi-finals.

== International competitions ==
Representing Greece
Year	Competition	Venue	Position	Event	Time
2016	World U20 Championships	Bydgoszcz, Poland	10th (sf)	400 m hurdles	58.48 NU20R
2022	Mediterranean Games	Oran, Algeria	4th	400 m hurdles	56.55 PB
2022	European Championships	Munich, Germany	13th (sf)	400 m hurdles	56.14 PB
2022	European Championships	Munich, Germany	14th (sf)	4 × 400 m relay	3:33.33 SB
2023	Balkan Championships	Kraljevo, Serbia	1st	400 m hurdles	56.45
2023	Balkan Championships	Kraljevo, Serbia	2nd	4 × 400 m relay	3:33.35
2023	World Championships	Budapest, Hungary	28th (h)	400 m hurdles	56.18 SB
2024	European Championships	Rome, Italy	16th (h)	400 m hurdles	56.62
2026	Mediterranean Games	Taranto, Italy	6th	400 m hurdles	58.35
2026	Mediterranean Games	Taranto, Italy	4th	4 × 400 m relay mixed	3:23.65
