= Panama at the 2015 World Championships in Athletics =

- WA code: PAN

in Beijing
- Competitors: 3
- Medals: Gold 0 Silver 0 Bronze 0 Total 0

World Championships in Athletics appearances
- 1983; 1987; 1991; 1993; 1995; 1997; 1999; 2001; 2003; 2005; 2007; 2009; 2011; 2013; 2015; 2017; 2019; 2022; 2023; 2025

Panama competed at the 2015 World Championships in Athletics in Beijing, China, from 22–30 August 2015.

== Results ==
(q – qualified, NM – no mark, SB – season best)

=== Men ===
Track and road events

Athlete	Event	Heat		Semifinal		Final	
Athlete	Event	Result	Rank	Result	Rank	Result	Rank
Alonso Edward	200 metres	20.11	2 Q	20.02	4 Q	19.87 SB	4

=== Women ===
Track and road events

Athlete	Event	Heat		Semifinal		Final	
Athlete	Event	Result	Rank	Result	Rank	Result	Rank
Yvette Lewis	100 metres hurdles	14.12	36	did not advance			
Rolanda Bell	3000 metres steeplechase	10:33.78	42	—N/a		did not advance	
