= Panama at the 2017 World Championships in Athletics =

- Flag of Panama
- WA code: PAN
- National federation: Panamanian Athletics Federation
- Website: fepatpanama.com (in Spanish)

in London, United Kingdom 4–13 August 2017
- Competitors: 3 (2 men and 1 woman) in 3 events
- Medals: Gold 0 Silver 0 Bronze 0 Total 0

World Championships in Athletics appearances
- 1983; 1987; 1991; 1993; 1995; 1997; 1999; 2001; 2003; 2005; 2007; 2009; 2011; 2013; 2015; 2017; 2019; 2022; 2023

Panama competed at the 2017 World Championships in Athletics in London, United Kingdom, from 4–13 August 2017.

== Results ==
=== Men ===
Track and road events

Athlete	Event	Heat		Semifinal		Final	
Athlete	Event	Result	Rank	Result	Rank	Result	Rank
Alonso Edward	200 metres	20.61 SB	28	Did not advance			
Jorge Castelblanco	Marathon	—				DNF	–

=== Women ===
Track and road events

Athlete	Event	Heat		Semifinal		Final	
Athlete	Event	Result	Rank	Result	Rank	Result	Rank
Gianna Woodruff	400 metres hurdles	56.50	21 Q	57.32	22	Did not advance	
