= Panama at the 1983 World Championships in Athletics =

- Flag of Panama
- WA code: PAN

in Helsinki, Finland 7 to 14 August 1983
- Competitors: 2 (1 man and 1 woman) in 3 events
- Medals: Gold 0 Silver 0 Bronze 0 Total 0

World Championships in Athletics appearances
- 1983; 1987; 1991; 1993; 1995; 1997; 1999; 2001; 2003; 2005; 2007; 2009; 2011; 2013; 2015; 2017; 2019; 2022; 2023; 2025

Panama competed at the 1983 World Championships in Athletics in Helsinki, Finland, which were held from 7 to 14 August 1983. The athlete delegation consisted of two athletes, sprinters Héctor Daley and Irina Ambulo. Daley competed in the men's 200 and 400 metres while Ambulo competed in the women's 400 metres; both of them reached the semifinals of their entered events.

== Background ==
The 1983 World Championships in Athletics were held at the Helsinki Olympic Stadium in Helsinki, Finland. Under the auspices of the International Amateur Athletics Federation, this was the first edition of the World Championships. It was held from 7 to 14 August 1983 and had 41 different events. Among the competing teams was the nation of Panama. For this edition of the World Championships in Athletics, sprinters Héctor Daley and Irina Ambulo competed for the nation.

== Men ==
Daley first competed in the qualifying heats of the men's 400 metres on 7 August 1983 in the fifth heat against six other competitors. There, he recorded a time of 47.19 seconds and placed fifth, advancing to the quarterfinals held the next day as he was within the eleven next fastest athletes that were outside of the top three of their respective heats. He then competed in the fourth and last quarterfinal against seven other competitors. There, he recorded a time of 46.42 seconds and placed fourth, failing to advance further to the semifinals as only the top four of each heat would only be able to do so.

He then competed in the qualifying heats of the men's 200 metres on 13 August 1983 in the first heat against seven other competitors. There, he recorded a time of 21.49 seconds and placed fifth, advancing to the quarterfinals. He was set to compete in the fourth quarterfinal against seven other competitors but ultimately did not start in his event.

Track and road events

| Athlete | Event | Heat | | Quarterfinal | | Semifinal | | Final | |
| Athlete | Event | Result | Rank | Result | Rank | Result | Rank | Result | Rank |
|---|---|---|---|---|---|---|---|---|---|
| Héctor Daley | 200 metres | 21.49 | 5 q | Did not start | | Did not advance | | | |
| Héctor Daley | 400 metres | 47.19 | 5 q | 46.42 | 4 | Did not advance | | | |

== Women ==
Ambulo competed in the qualifying heats of the women's 400 metres on 7 August 1983 in the fifth heat against five other competitors. There, she recorded a time of 56.08 seconds and placed fifth, advancing further to the quarterfinals held the following day. She competed in the third quarterfinal against six other competitors and placed last with a time of 58.33 seconds, failing to advance further.

Track and road events

| Athlete | Event | Heat | | Quarterfinal | | Semifinal | | Final | |
| Athlete | Event | Result | Rank | Result | Rank | Result | Rank | Result | Rank |
|---|---|---|---|---|---|---|---|---|---|
| Irina Ambulo | 400 metres | 56.08 | 24 q | 58.33 | 25 | Did not advance | | | |
