= Panama at the 2023 World Athletics Championships =

- Flag of Panama
- WA code: PAN

in Budapest, Hungary 19 August 2023 – 27 August 2023
- Competitors: 2 (1 man and 1 woman)
- Medals: Gold 0 Silver 0 Bronze 0 Total 0

World Athletics Championships appearances
- 1983; 1987; 1991; 1993; 1995; 1997; 1999; 2001; 2003; 2005; 2007; 2009; 2011; 2013; 2015; 2017; 2019; 2022; 2023

Panama competed at the 2023 World Athletics Championships in Budapest, Hungary, from 19 to 27 August 2023. The athlete delegation of the country was composed of two competitors, hurdler Gianna Woodruff and sprinter Alonso Edward. Woodruff qualified after she had achieved a time that was within the qualifying standard while Edward qualified through his World Athletics Ranking.

Woodruff was the first competitor for the nation, competing in the heats of the women's 400 metres hurdles. She finished third in the heat and advanced to the semifinals. In the semifinals, she placed fifth in her round and did not advance to the finals. Edward then competed in the heats of the men's 200 metres but was eliminated in the heats.

== Background ==
The 2023 World Athletics Championships in Budapest, Hungary, were held from 19 to 27 August 2023. The Championships were held at the National Athletics Centre. To qualify for the World Championships, athletes had to reach an entry standard (e.g. time or distance), place in a specific position at select competitions, be a wild card entry, or qualify through their World Athletics Ranking at the end of the qualification period.

Hurdler Gianna Woodruff qualified after she had recorded a time of 54.46 seconds in the women's 400 metres during the qualification period, which was within the entry standard of 54.90 seconds. Sprinter Alonso Edward did not achieve an entry standard-setting time but was ranked high enough and thus qualified. Edward had already won a medal for the nation at the Championships, winning a silver medal in the men's 200 metres at the 2009 World Championships in Athletics.

== Results ==
Key

- Q = Qualified for the next round
- q = Qualified for the next round as a fastest loser or, in field events, by position without achieving the qualifying target
- NR = National record
- PB = Personal best
- SB = Season best
- N/A = Round not applicable for the event

=== Men ===
Edward competed in the heats of the men's 200 metres on 23 August against seven other sprinters. There, he placed fourth in the heat with a time of 20.63 seconds and nearly qualified, but did not place high enough to qualify for the semifinals of the event.

Track and road events

Athlete	Event	Heat		Semifinal		Final	
Athlete	Event	Result	Rank	Result	Rank	Result	Rank
Alonso Edward	200 metres	20.63	4	Did not advance			

=== Women ===
Woodruff competed in the heats of the women's 400 metres hurdles on 21 August against seven other hurdlers. There, she placed third in the heat with a time of 55.31 seconds and qualified for the semifinals. The semifinals of the event were held the following day, with Woodruff racing in the first heat against seven other hurdlers. She finished with a time of 54.71 seconds and placed fifth in the heat, not qualifying for the finals of the event.

Track and road events

Athlete	Event	Heat		Semifinal		Final	
Athlete	Event	Result	Rank	Result	Rank	Result	Rank
Gianna Woodruff	400 metres hurdles	55.31	3 Q	54.71	5	Did not advance	
