= Agata Zupin =

Slovenian hurdler (born 1998)

Personal information
- Born: 17 March 1998 (age 28)
- Height: 1.80 m (5 ft 11 in)
- Weight: 67 kg (148 lb)

Sport
- Sport: Athletics
- Event: 400 m hurdles
- Club: Atletsko društvo Kamnik
- Coached by: Damjan Zlatnar

Agata Zupin (born 17 March 1998) is a Slovenian athlete specialising in the 400 metre hurdles. She competed at the 2017 World Championships where she reached the semifinals. She won a silver medal in the event at the 2017 European U20 Championships.

== International competitions ==
Year	Competition	Venue	Position	Event	Notes
Representing Slovenia
2015	World Youth Championships	Cali, Colombia	30th (h)	200 m	25.07
2016	World U20 Championships	Bydgoszcz, Poland	36th (h)	400 m hurdles	62.08
2017	European U20 Championships	Grosseto, Italy	2nd	400 m hurdles	55.96
2017	World Championships	London, United Kingdom	21st (sf)	400 m hurdles	57.05
2019	European U23 Championships	Gävle, Sweden	5th	400 m hurdles	56.97
2022	World Indoor Championships	Belgrade, Serbia	10th (h)	4 × 400 m relay	3:37.08
2022	Mediterranean Games	Oran, Algeria	8th (h)	400 m hurdles	58.06^{1}
2022	Mediterranean Games	Oran, Algeria	2nd	4 × 400 m relay	3:31.51
2022	World Championships	Eugene, United States	32nd (h)	400 m hurdles	57.12
2022	European Championships	Munich, Germany	20th (h)	400 m hurdles	57.42
2022	European Championships	Munich, Germany	13th (h)	4 × 400 m relay	3:31.57
2023	World Championships	Budapest, Hungary	36th (h)	400 m hurdles	57.62
2024	European Championships	Rome, Italy	21st (h)	400 m hurdles	57.83
2026	Mediterranean Games	Taranto, Italy	7th	400 m hurdles	58.73

^{1} Did not start in the final

== Personal bests ==
=== Outdoor ===
Event	Time (sec)	Venue	Date
100 metres	11.60	Ptuj, Slovenia	8 Jul 2017
200 metres	23.09	Kranj, Slovenia	10 Jun 2017
400 metres	52.29	Velenje, Slovenia	20 Jun 2017
300 metres hurdles	41.86	Ostrava, Czech Republic	8 Sep 2020
400 m hurdles	55.96 NR	Grosseto, Italy	23 Jul 2017
4 × 400 m relay	3:34.19 NR	Tel Aviv, Israel	25 Jun 2017

=== Indoor ===
Event	Time (sec)	Venue	Date
60 metres	7.43	Ljubljana, Slovenia	3 Feb 2018
400 metres	53.48	Chemnitz, Germany	10 Feb 2018

- All information taken from athlete's World Athletics profile.
- NR = National record
