= 2016 IAAF World U20 Championships – Women's 400 metres hurdles =

The women's 400 metres hurdles event at the 2016 IAAF World U20 Championships was held at Zdzisław Krzyszkowiak Stadium on 20, 21 and 22 July.

== Medalists ==
Gold	Anna Cockrell; United States
Silver	Shannon Kalawan; Jamaica
Bronze	Xahria Santiago; Canada

== Records ==
Standing records prior to the 2016 IAAF World U20 Championships in Athletics
World Junior Record	Sydney McLaughlin (USA)	54.15	Eugene, United States	10 July 2016
Championship Record	Lashinda Demus (USA)	54.70	Kingston, Jamaica	19 July 2002
World Junior Leading	Sydney McLaughlin (USA)	54.15	Eugene, United States	10 July 2016

== Results ==
=== Heats ===
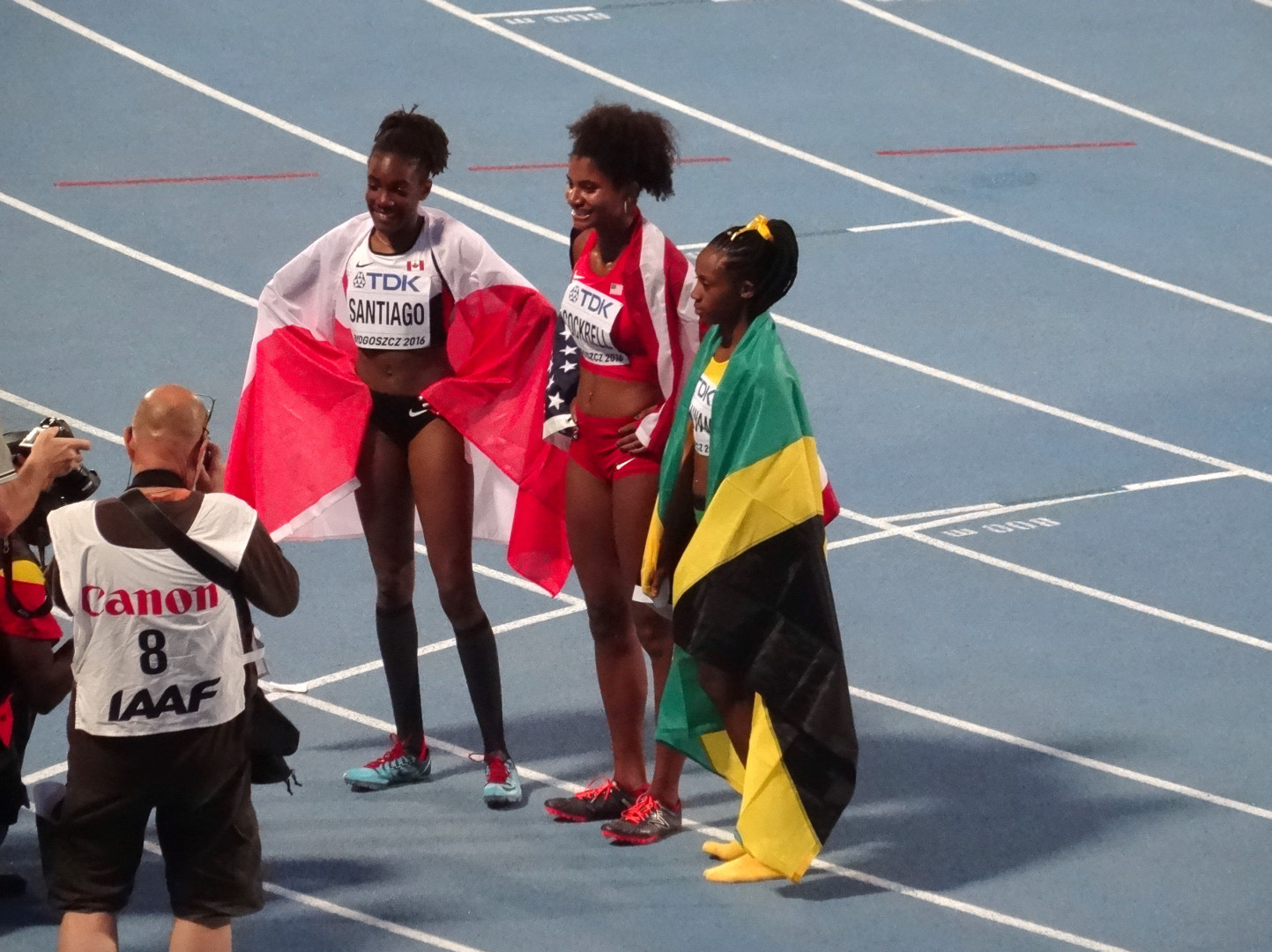
The medallists

Qualification: First 4 of each heat (Q) and the 4 fastest times (q) qualified for the semifinals.

Rank	Heat	Name	Nationality	Time	Note
1	2	Anna Cockrell	United States	56.85	Q
2	5	Aminat Yusuf Jamal	Bahrain	56.94	Q, NU20R
3	2	Gezelle Magerman	South Africa	57.75	Q, PB
4	1	Eileen Demes	Germany	57.77	Q, PB
5	5	Shannon Kalawan	Jamaica	58.23	Q
6	1	Anaïs Seiller	France	58.44	Q, PB
7	3	Xahria Santiago	Canada	58.48	Q
8	4	Tereza Vokálová	Czech Republic	58.62	Q
9	5	Mariam Abdul-Rashid	Canada	58.65	Q, SB
10	3	Julie Hounsinou	France	58.65	Q, PB
11	1	Haruko Ishizuka	Japan	58.66	Q
12	4	Eleonora Marchiando	Italy	58.75	Q, PB
13	1	Michaela Pešková	Slovakia	59.03	Q
14	5	Johanna Dyremark	Sweden	59.04	Q, PB
15	5	Dimitra Gnafaki	Greece	59.13	q
16	4	Nicolee Foster	Jamaica	59.19	Q
17	3	Karoline Maria Sauer	Germany	59.37	Q
18	4	Alanah Yukich	Australia	59.54	Q
19	1	Jelena Grujić	Serbia	59.79	q, PB
20	4	Anne Sofie Kirkegaard	Denmark	59.96	q
21	2	Yana Khabina	Ukraine	59.98	Q
22	4	Iulia Nicoleta Banaga	Romania	59.99	q, PB
23	5	Aneja Simončič	Slovenia	1:00.03	SB
24	1	Anna Kiafa	Greece	1:00.26	
25	5	Daniela Rojas	Costa Rica	1:00.30	
26	1	Tereza Jonášová	Czech Republic	1:00.33	
27	3	Dariya Stavnycha	Ukraine	1:00.53	Q
28	3	Brandeé Johnson	United States	1:00.58	
29	3	Noémi Szücs	Hungary	1:00.90	
30	2	Lakeisha Warner	British Virgin Islands	1:00.93	Q
31	5	Wang Chen	China	1:00.97	
32	1	Gioi Spinello	Italy	1:01.13	
33	2	Ma Jie	China	1:01.65	
34	3	Mizuki Murakami	Japan	1:01.78	
35	4	Dreshanae Rolle	Bahamas	1:02.03	
36	2	Agata Zupin	Slovenia	1:02.08	
37	2	Adelina Akhmetova	Kazakhstan	1:02.24	
38	2	Rokia Fofana	Burkina Faso	1:02.62	NU20R
39	3	Christina Francisco	Guam	1:05.51	
	4	Chelsea Walker	Great Britain	DNF	

=== Semifinals ===
Qualification: First 2 of each heat (Q) and the 2 fastest times (q) qualified for the final.

Rank	Heat	Name	Nationality	Time	Note
1	3	Anna Cockrell	United States	56.10	Q
2	1	Eileen Demes	Germany	57.13	Q, PB
3	2	Aminat Yusuf Jamal	Bahrain	57.28	Q
4	1	Xahria Santiago	Canada	57.32	Q
5	3	Shannon Kalawan	Jamaica	57.62	Q
6	2	Mariam Abdul-Rashid	Canada	57.69	Q, SB
7	1	Michaela Pešková	Slovakia	58.08	q, SB
8	2	Tereza Vokálová	Czech Republic	58.33	q
9	2	Anaïs Seiller	France	58.47	
10	1	Dimitra Gnafaki	Greece	58.48	NU20R
11	3	Haruko Ishizuka	Japan	58.55	
12	3	Gezelle Magerman	South Africa	58.76	
13	1	Eleonora Marchiando	Italy	58.88	
14	2	Nicolee Foster	Jamaica	58.93	
15	1	Julie Hounsinou	France	59.02	
16	2	Anne Sofie Kirkegaard	Denmark	59.13	
17	3	Karoline Maria Sauer	Germany	59.15	
18	3	Alanah Yukich	Australia	59.20	PB
19	1	Yana Khabina	Ukraine	59.84	
20	2	Johanna Dyremark	Sweden	59.89	
21	1	Jelena Grujić	Serbia	1:00.05	
22	3	Dariya Stavnycha	Ukraine	1:00.43	
23	3	Iulia Nicoleta Banaga	Romania	1:00.56	
	2	Lakeisha Warner	British Virgin Islands	DNF	

=== Final ===
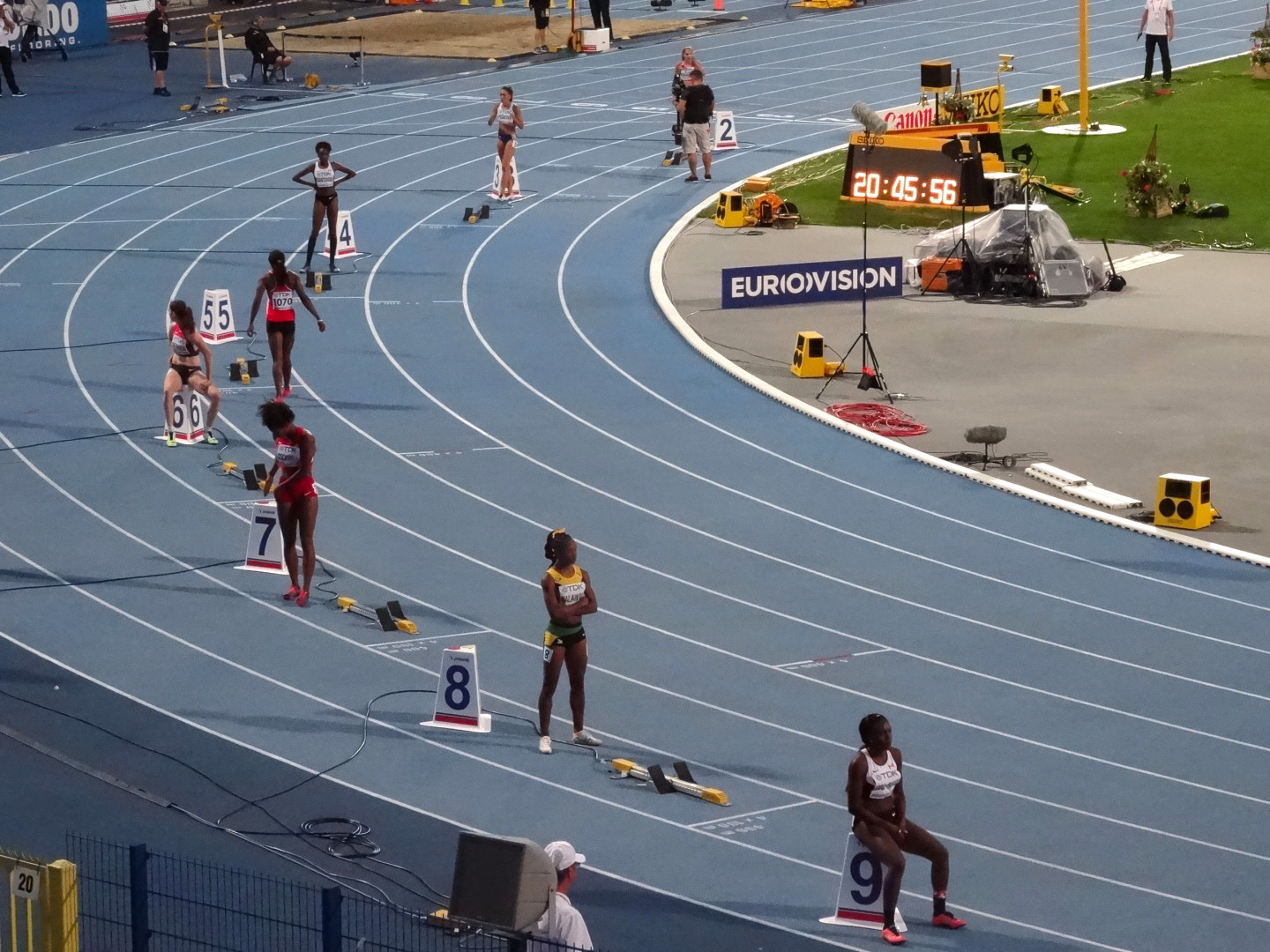
The finalists

Rank	Lane	Name	Nationality	Time	Note
1st place, gold medalist(s)	7	Anna Cockrell	United States	55.20	PB
2nd place, silver medalist(s)	8	Shannon Kalawan	Jamaica	56.54	
3rd place, bronze medalist(s)	4	Xahria Santiago	Canada	56.90	SB
4	6	Eileen Demes	Germany	57.83	
5	3	Michaela Pešková	Slovakia	58.17	
6	5	Aminat Yusuf Jamal	Bahrain	58.23	
7	2	Tereza Vokálová	Czech Republic	59.08	
8	9	Mariam Abdul-Rashid	Canada	59.66	
