= Andrenette Knight =

Jamaican athlete (born 1996)

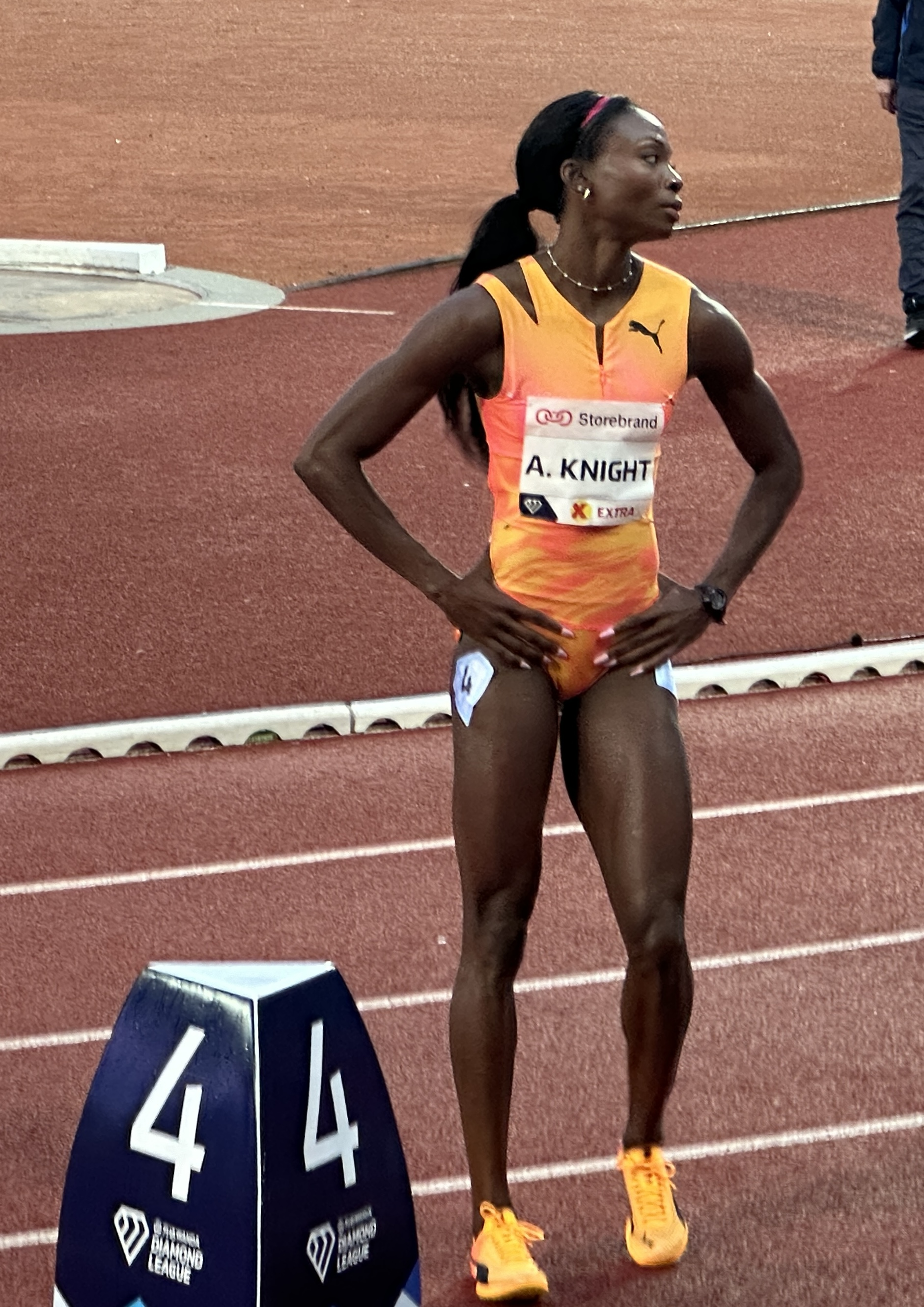

Personal information
- Nationality: Jamaican
- Born: 19 November 1996 (age 29)
- Home town: St. Thomas, Jamaica

Sport
- Sport: Athletics
- Event: 400m hurdles
- College team: San Diego State Aztecs; Virginia Cavaliers
- Club: Hurdle Mechanic
- Coached by: Boogie Johnson

Achievements and titles
- Personal bests: 400m hurdles: 53.26 (Székesfehérvár, 2023); 400m: 51.23 (Kingston, 2024)
Medal record
Women's athletics
Representing Jamaica
World Championships
| Silver medal – second place | 2025 Tokyo | 4 × 400 m relay |
NACAC Championships
| Silver medal – second place | 2022 Freeport | 4×400 m relay |
| Silver medal – second place | 2022 Freeport | Mixed 4×400 m relay |
Diamond League
| Third place | 2025 Zurich | 400 mh |
CARIFTA Games (Junior)
| Gold medal – first place | 2014 Fort-de-France | 4×400 m relay |
| Silver medal – second place | 2014 Fort-de-France | 400m hurdles |

Andrenette Knight (born 19 November 1996) is a Jamaican track and field athlete who competes over 400m hurdles.

== Biography ==
She was born in Morant Bay St. Thomas, Jamaica. Knight attended Vere Technical High School in Hayes, Jamaica (Clarendon), where she ran on the relay team with Shericka Jackson. Also, she represented the St. Jago High School in Spanish Town, St. Catherine. In high school, she came 2nd in the 400m hurdles, and 3rd in the 100m hurdles at the 2016 ISSA Boys and Girls Athletics Championships. Initially, she studied at San Diego State University, then transferred to the University of Virginia, and eventually left the collegiate system with a personal best of 55.75 seconds for the 400m hurdles.

== Career ==
In college, she won the ACC twice in 2019 and 2021. Moreover, she mined a bronze medal at the 2021 NCAA Outdoor Championships clocking 55.81 to be awarded first team all-America honors.

In 2022, she lowered her PB to 53.39 in Nashville. Knight won two relay silver medals at the 2022 NACAC Championships.

In 2023, she finished as runner-up at the Jamaican national championships. She ran a personal best of 53.26s at the Hungarian Athletics Grand Prix in July 2023. She was selected for the 2023 World Athletics Championships in Budapest in August 2023, and qualified for the final of the 400m hurdles.

In February 2024, she was selected to run for Jamaica at the 2024 World Athletics Indoor Championships in Glasgow. She was part of the 4 × 400 m relay team which reached the final in Glasgow. In June 2024, she finished third in the 400m hurdles at the 2024 Diamond League event in Stockholm. She competed in the women's 4 x 400 metres relay at the 2024 Paris Olympics.

She was runner-up to Femke Bol in 53.90 in the 400 metres hurdles at the 2025 Meeting International Mohammed VI d'Athlétisme de Rabat, part of the 2025 Diamond League. In May 2025, she was named as a challenger for the long hurdles category at the 2025 Grand Slam Track event in Philadelphia. She was the winner of the 400 metres hurdles at the Diamond League event at the 2025 Golden Gala in Rome on 6 June 2025. She was runner-up in the 400 metres hurdles final at the 2025 Jamaican Athletics Championships in 54.52 seconds. She finished fifth in Monaco at the 2025 Herculis, and third at the 2025 London Athletics Meet, in July 2025. She placed third at the Diamond League Final in Zurich on 28 August.

She was a semi-finalist in the women's 400 metres hurdles at the 2025 World Athletics Championships in Tokyo, Japan, in September 2025.

In May 2026, she ran at the 2026 World Athletics Relays in the women's 4 × 400 metres relay in Gaborone, Botswana.

== Statistics ==
Grand Slam Track results
| Slam | Race group | Event | Pl. | Time | Prize money |
|---|---|---|---|---|---|
| 2025 Kingston Slam | Long hurdles | 400 m hurdles | 4th | 55.06 | US$30,000 |
| 2025 Kingston Slam | Long hurdles | 400 m | 2nd | 52.09 | US$30,000 |
| 2025 Miami Slam | Long hurdles | 400 m hurdles | 2nd | 54.08 | US$50,000 |
| 2025 Miami Slam | Long hurdles | 400 m | 3rd | 51.80 | US$50,000 |
| 2025 Philadelphia Slam | Long hurdles | 400 m hurdles | 3rd | 54.86 | US$25,000 |
| 2025 Philadelphia Slam | Long hurdles | 400 m | 3rd | 52.87 | US$25,000 |
