= Panama at the 2011 World Championships in Athletics =

- WA code: PAN
- National federation: Federación Panameña de Atletismo

in Daegu
- Competitors: 2
- Medals: Gold 0 Silver 0 Bronze 0 Total 0

World Championships in Athletics appearances
- 1983; 1987; 1991; 1993; 1995; 1997; 1999; 2001; 2003; 2005; 2007; 2009; 2011; 2013; 2015; 2017; 2019; 2022; 2023

Panamá competed at the 2011 World Championships in Athletics from August 27 to September 4 in Daegu, South Korea. A team of 2 athletes was announced to represent the country in the event consisting of Olympic gold medalist, long jumper Irving Saladino, and last world championships 200m silver medalist Alonso Edward.

== Results ==
=== Men ===
Athlete	Event	Preliminaries		Heats		Semifinals		Final	
Athlete	Event	Time Width Height	Rank	Time Width Height	Rank	Time Width Height	Rank	Time Width Height	Rank
Alonso Edward	200 metres			20.55	9	20.52	6	DNF	
Irving Saladino	Long jump	7.84	22					Did not advance	
