= Anna Cockrell =

American track and field athlete (born 1997)

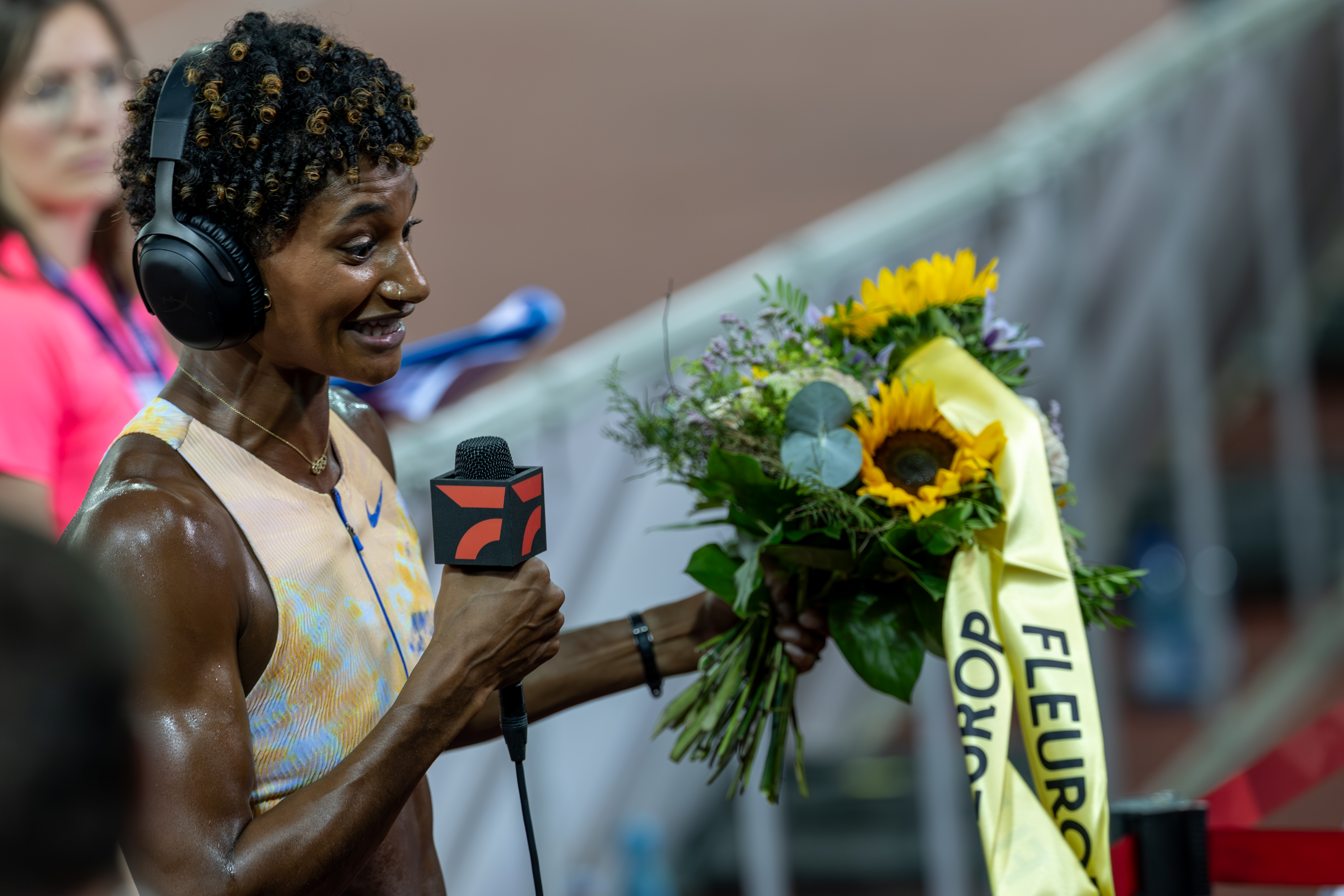
- Cockrell in 2026

Personal information
- Born: August 28, 1997 (age 29) San Ramon, California, U.S.
- Home town: Charlotte, North Carolina, U.S.
- Height: 5 ft 10 in (178 cm)

Sport
- Country: United States
- Sport: Track and field
- Events: Sprinting; Hurdling
- College team: USC Trojans (2017–2021)
- Team: Nike

Achievements and titles
- Personal bests: 100 m hurdles: 12.54 (Eugene, 2021); 400 m hurdles: 51.87 (Paris, 2024)
Medal record
Women's athletics
Representing the United States
Olympic Games
Silver medal – second place	2024 Paris	400 m hurdles
Diamond League
First place	2026	400 m hurdles
Pan American Games
Gold medal – first place	2019 Lima	4 × 400 m relay
Silver medal – second place	2019 Lima	400 m hurdles
World U20 Championships
Gold medal – first place	2016 Bydgoszcz	400 m hurdles
Gold medal – first place	2016 Bydgoszcz	4 × 400 m relay
Pan American U20 Championships
Gold medal – first place	2015 Edmonton	400 m hurdles

Anna Cockrell (born August 28, 1997) is an American track and field athlete competing in sprinting and hurdling. She is a two-time medalist at the 2019 Pan American Games in Lima, Peru and won the silver medal at the 2024 Summer Olympics in 400 m hurdles event.

== Early life ==
Cockrell was born on August 28, 1997, in San Ramon, California to Serena and Kieth Cockrell as the youngest of three children. The family later moved to Charlotte from Detroit, where all three Cockrell children attended Charlotte Latin School. She comes from a family of athletes: her father played football at Columbia University, her older brother, Ross, is a cornerback who won a Super Bowl with the Tampa Bay Buccaneers, and her older sister, Ciera, played volleyball at Davidson College.

== High school ==
Cockrell attended Charlotte Latin School in elementary school, and later transferred to Providence Day School in Charlotte, North Carolina, graduating in 2016. She competed within the school's high school track and field program led by coach Carol Lawrence. In 2016, she won the gold medal in the women's 400 metres hurdles event, with a personal best of 55.20s, at the 2016 IAAF World U20 Championships held in Bydgoszcz, Poland. She also won the gold medal in the women's 4 × 400 metres relay event.

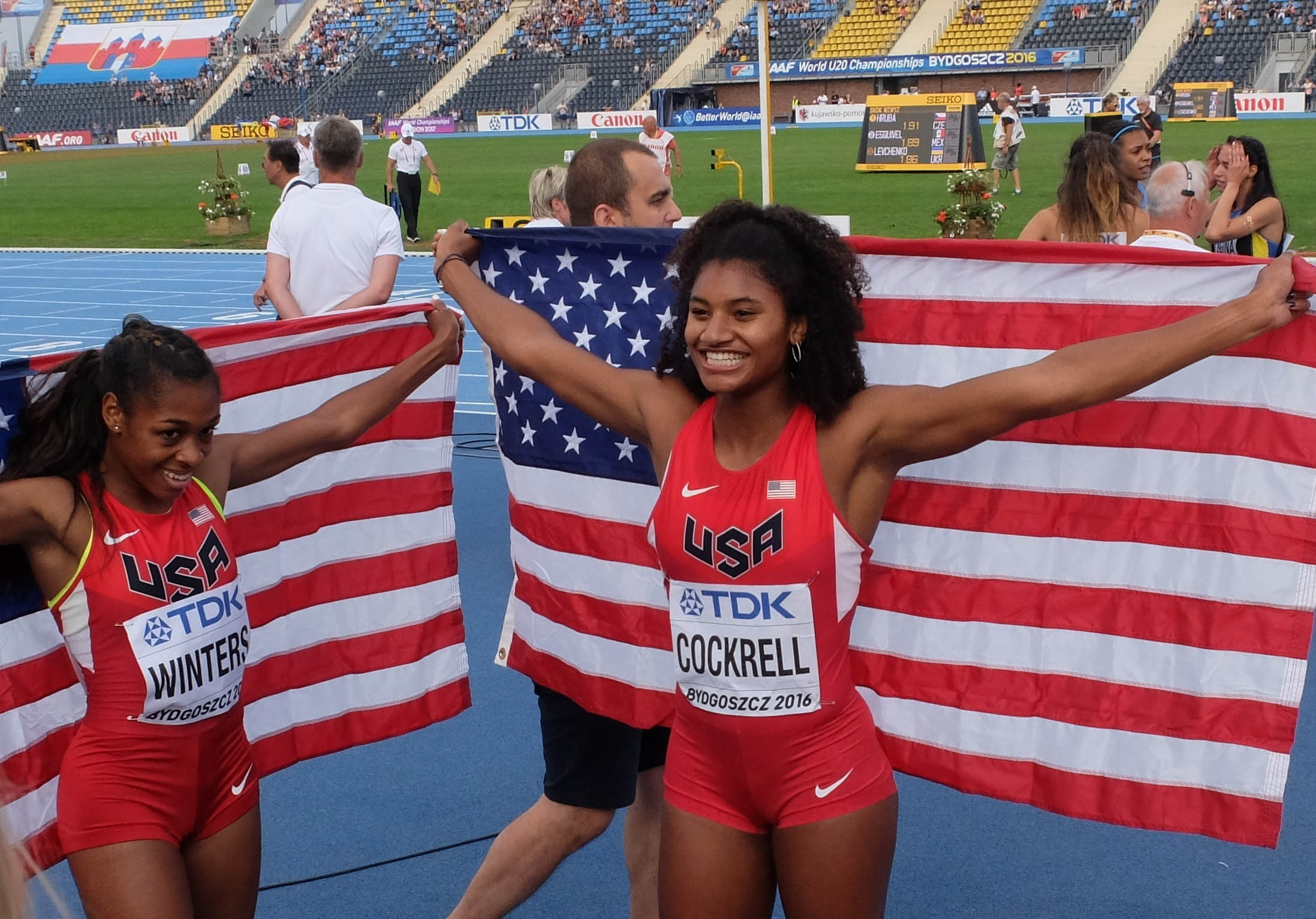
Bydgoszcz 2016

== Career ==
=== 2017–2021: USC Trojans ===
In June 2019, Cockrell became the NCAA champion at the year's NCAA championships for the women's 400-meter hurdle event with a time of 55.23 after being a runner-up in each of the two years prior. In August 2019, she won the silver medal in the women's 400 metres hurdles event and the gold medal in the women's 4 × 400 metres relay event at the 2019 Pan American Games held in Lima, Peru.

In May 2021, Cockrell was named the 2021 Pac-12 Women's Track & Field Scholar Athlete of the Year before helping to lead her school to a third consecutive conference team title at the 2021 Pac-12 championships by winning the women's 100-meter and 400-meter hurdles events. The following month, after the cancellation of the prior year's competition due to the COVID-19 pandemic, Cockrell became the 2021 NCAA champion for the women's 100-meter hurdles and 400-meter hurdles events to help drive her school to win the team title at the 2021 NCAA Division I Outdoor Track and Field Championships. She ran the 100-meter hurdles with a time of 12.58 and the 400-meter hurdles with a time of 54.68 and became the second woman in history to win both events in the same season at the NCAA championships. Her achievements led her to receive the 2021 Honda Sports Award for track and field and the Pac-12's Tom Hansen Conference Medal for the year.

Cockrell graduated from the University of Southern California in 2019 with a bachelor's degree in communications from the Annenberg School and a minor in political science. She went on to earn her master's in public policy with a certificate in public policy advocacy in 2021.

=== 2020 Summer Olympics: Olympic debut ===
At the 2020 United States Olympic Trials for track and field on June 27, 2021, Cockrell placed third in the women's 400-meter hurdles event to qualify for the team alongside Sydney McLaughlin and Dalilah Muhammad. She broke her personal and school record in the 400-metre hurdles event with a time of 53.70, ahead of the previous record she set at the 2021 NCAA championships.

At the Olympics, Cockrell qualified for the semifinals after coming in third in her heat race with a time of 55.37. She later finished in second place with a time of 54.17 in the semifinals, landing her a spot in the final. In the final, Cockrell appeared to finish seventh, but was later disqualified after officials discovered she had made a lane violation.

=== 2022-2023: 2023 World Championships ===
In 2022, Cockrell ran 53.98 to finish fourth in the 400 m hurdles at the US Championships, not qualifying for the 2022 World Athletics Championships.

The following year, she finished third at the 2023 US Championships in 54.24. At the World Championships in Budapest, Cockrell finished fifth in the 400 m hurdles, running a new personal best of 53.34.

=== 2024: Olympic silver medal and fourth all-time ===
At the US Olympic Trials, Cockrell finished second in the 400 m hurdles behind Sydney McLaughlin-Levrone. She ran a major personal best of 52.64 s, marking her first time under the 53-second barrier. She competed at the 2024 Olympics in Paris, where she won a silver medal in the women’s 400-metre hurdles. She came second to McLaughlin-Levrone, with a personal best time of 51.87 s, which put her fourth on the all-time top list. On 30 August, she picked up her first career Diamond League at the Golden Gala in Rome, running 52.59 s to beat Shiann Salmon into second.

=== 2025-2026: U.S. Champion ===
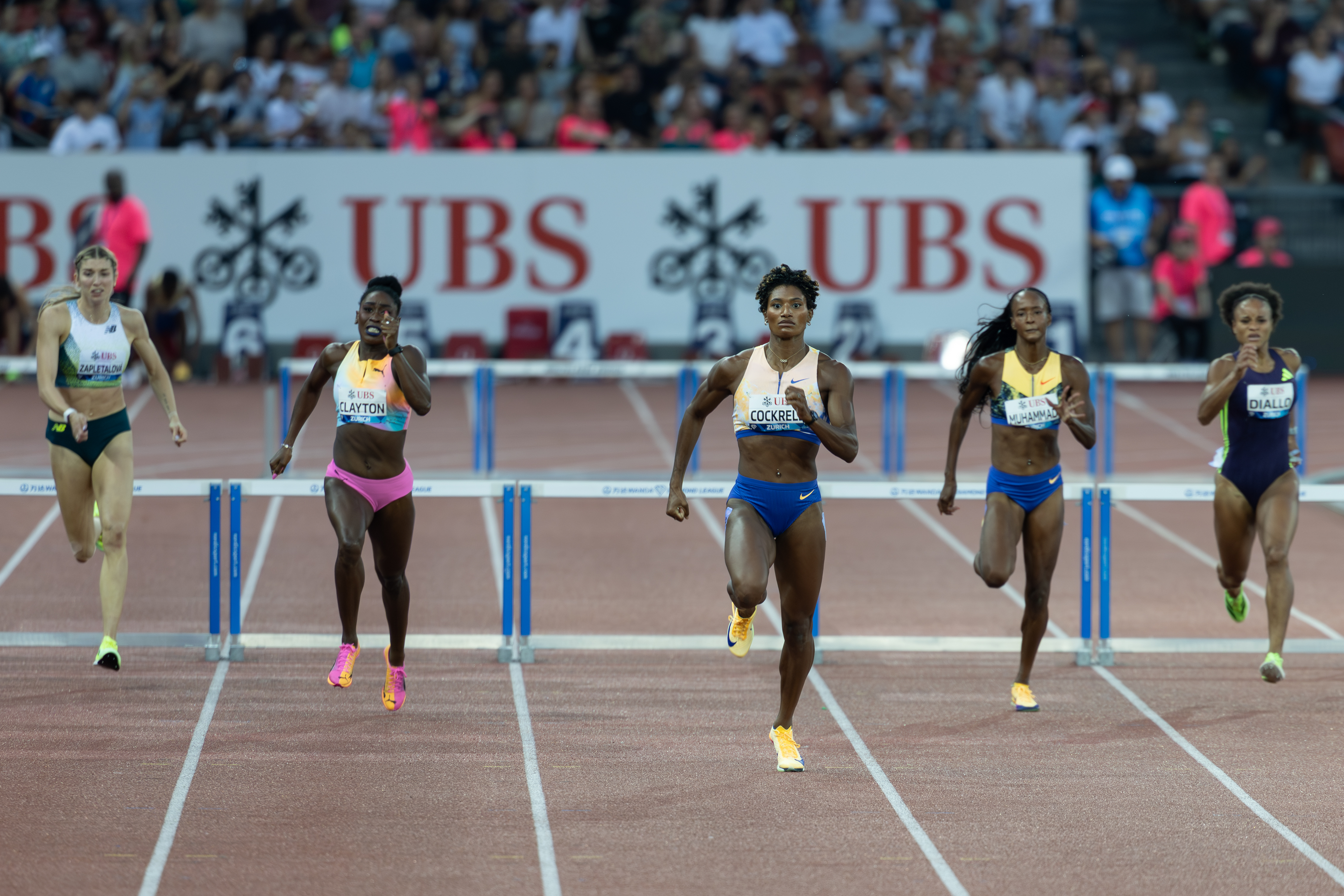
Cockrell on her way to winning at the 2026 Weltklasse Zürich.

On 22 August 2025, Cockrell won at the Memorial van Damme in Brussels, running 53.66 s to beat Gianna Woodruff. At the 2025 World Championships, she finished fourth in the 400 m hurdles, losing out on a medal to Emma Zapletalová by 0.13 s.

The following year, she won over 300 m hurdles at the Arkansas Twilight meet in Fayetteville on 8 May, running an area best of 37.40, to go second all-time behind Femke Broeders-Bol's 36.86 s. On 4 June, she placed second at the Rome Diamond League behind Zapletalova, running a season's best of 52.77 s. At the US Championships, Cockrell won over 400 m hurdles in a time of 52.94 s, winning her first national title. On 27 August, she won at the Zurich Diamond League, running a world lead and meeting record of 52.13 s, finishing over a second faster than second-placed Dalilah Muhammad (53.16) and setting her fastest time since her Olympic silver two years prior.

=== Circuit performances ===
Grand Slam Track results
Slam	Race group	Event	Pl.	Time	Prize money
2025 Philadelphia Slam	Long hurdles	400 m hurdles	1st	54.04	US$50,000
2025 Philadelphia Slam	Long hurdles	400 m	6th	53.35	US$50,000

== Personal life ==
Cockrell has been an outspoken advocate for the mental health of student-athletes after suffering a hamstring injury on the first day of the 2019 NCAA Division I Indoor Track and Field Championships in which she blamed herself for her school's loss in the team competition. After exhibiting severe symptoms of depression and suicidal tendencies, she eventually sought assistance from her friends, her head coach, and a sports psychologist, all of whom she thanked in her student-athlete graduation speech at USC that later went viral.

Achievements
Preceded by Femke Bol	Women's 400 m hurdles season's best performance 2026	Most recent
