= Eileen Demes =

German athlete

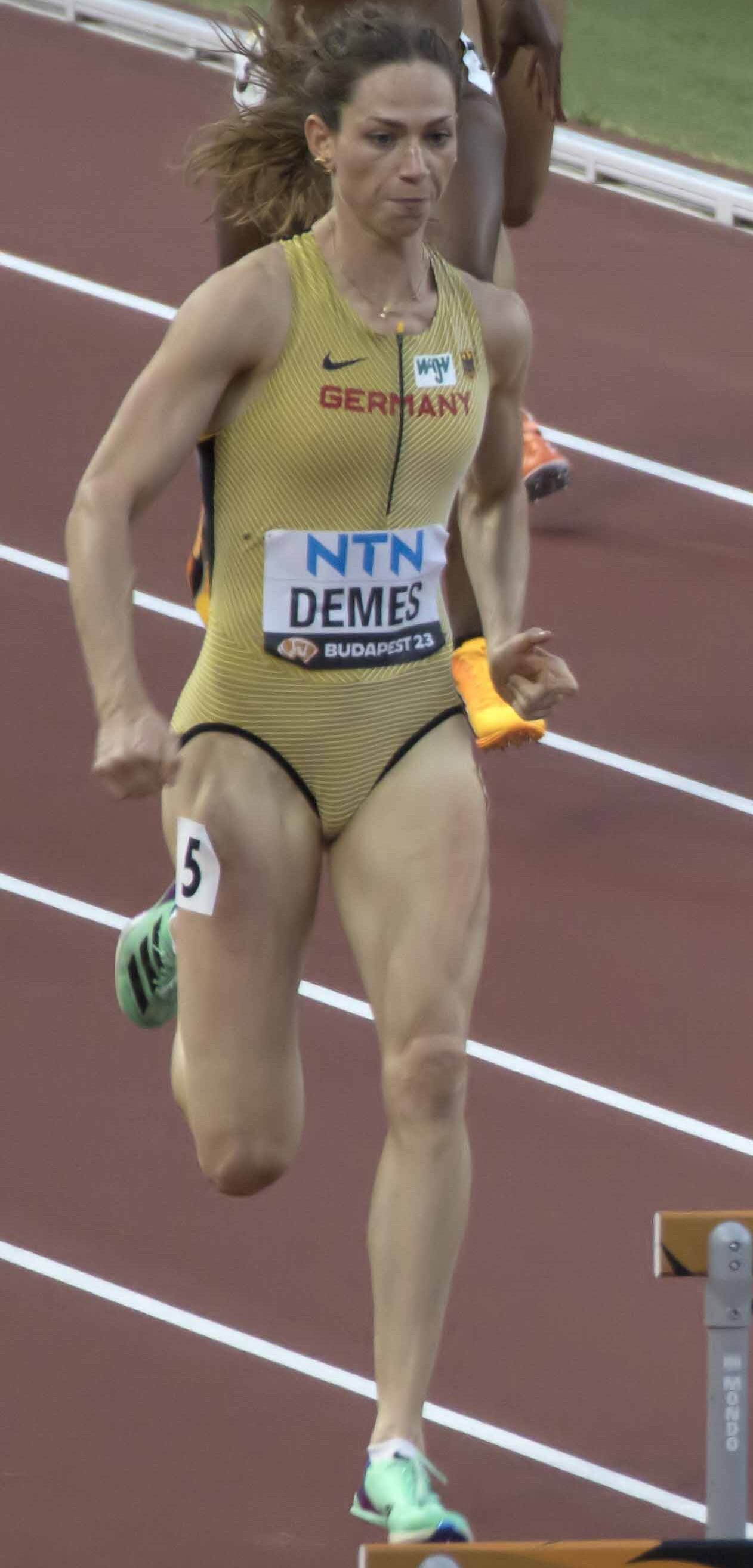
- Eileen Demes in 2023

Personal information
- Nationality: German
- Born: 13 October 1997 (age 28)

Sport
- Sport: Athletics
- Event: 400 m hurdles
- Club: TV 1861 Neu-Isenburg
- Coached by: Christian Kupper

Achievements and titles
- Personal bests: 400 m hurdles 54.29 (Berlin, 2025)
Medal record
Women's athletics
Representing Germany
German Athletics Championships
Gold medal – first place	2024 Braunschweig	400 m Hurdles
Gold medal – first place	2025 Dresden	400 m Hurdles
Gold medal – first place	2026 Bochum-Wattenscheid	400 m Hurdles
Silver medal – second place	2016 Kassel	400 m Hurdles
Silver medal – second place	2023 Kassel	400 m Hurdles
Bronze medal – third place	2022 Berlin	400 m Hurdles

Eileen Demes (born 13 October 1997) is a German track and field athlete who competes in the 400 m hurdles and the 4 × 400 metres relay. She has competed at multiple major championships including the 2024 Olympic Games.

== Biography ==
A member of TV 1861 Neu-Isenburg athletics club in Neu-Isenburg, Demes won the German U18 title in 400 m hurdles in 2014. Demes qualified as a semi-final winner for the final of the 400 m hurdles at the 2016 World Athletics U20 Championships in Bydgoszcz, Poland, as an 18-year-old, improving her personal best twice, from 55.77 in the preliminary heat to 57.13 seconds in the semi-final. She finished fourth in the final.

Demes won the German U23 title over 400 m hurdles in 2018, but her athletic progress was halted by a viral infection that was not initially accurately diagnosed, and from which recovery was not quick.

Demes finished second in the 400 m hurdles at the German national championships in Kassel in July 2023, with a personal best time of 55.72. It was the first competition she has tried out an altered technique, taking fourteen steps before the first hurdle.

Selected for the 2023 World Athletics Championships in Budapest in August 2023, she qualified for the semi-final in a personal best time of 55.29.

She was selected for the 2024 European Athletics Championships in Rome, reaching the semifinals and running a personal best 55.25 seconds. She was also a member of the Germany Women’s 4 × 400 metres relay at the Championships. She was selected for the Germany relay pool at the 2024 Olympic Games, where she competed in the women's 4 × 400 metres relay at the women's 4 × 400 m relay. She also competed in the mixed 4 × 400 m relay at the Games.

She competed at the 2025 World Athletics Relays in China in the Women's 4 × 400 metres relay in May 2025. She competed at the 2025 World Athletics Championships in Tokyo, Japan, running 55.03 seconds to qualify for the semi-finals, but did not advance to the final.

Demes competed in the German team at the 2026 World Athletics Relays in Gaborone, Botswana, running in the mixed 4 × 400 m relay and women's 4 × 400 m relay. Competing at the 2026 European Athletics Championships in Birmingham, England, she was a semi-finalist in the 400 metres hurdles.
