= Rebecca Sartori =

Italian hurdler (born 1997)

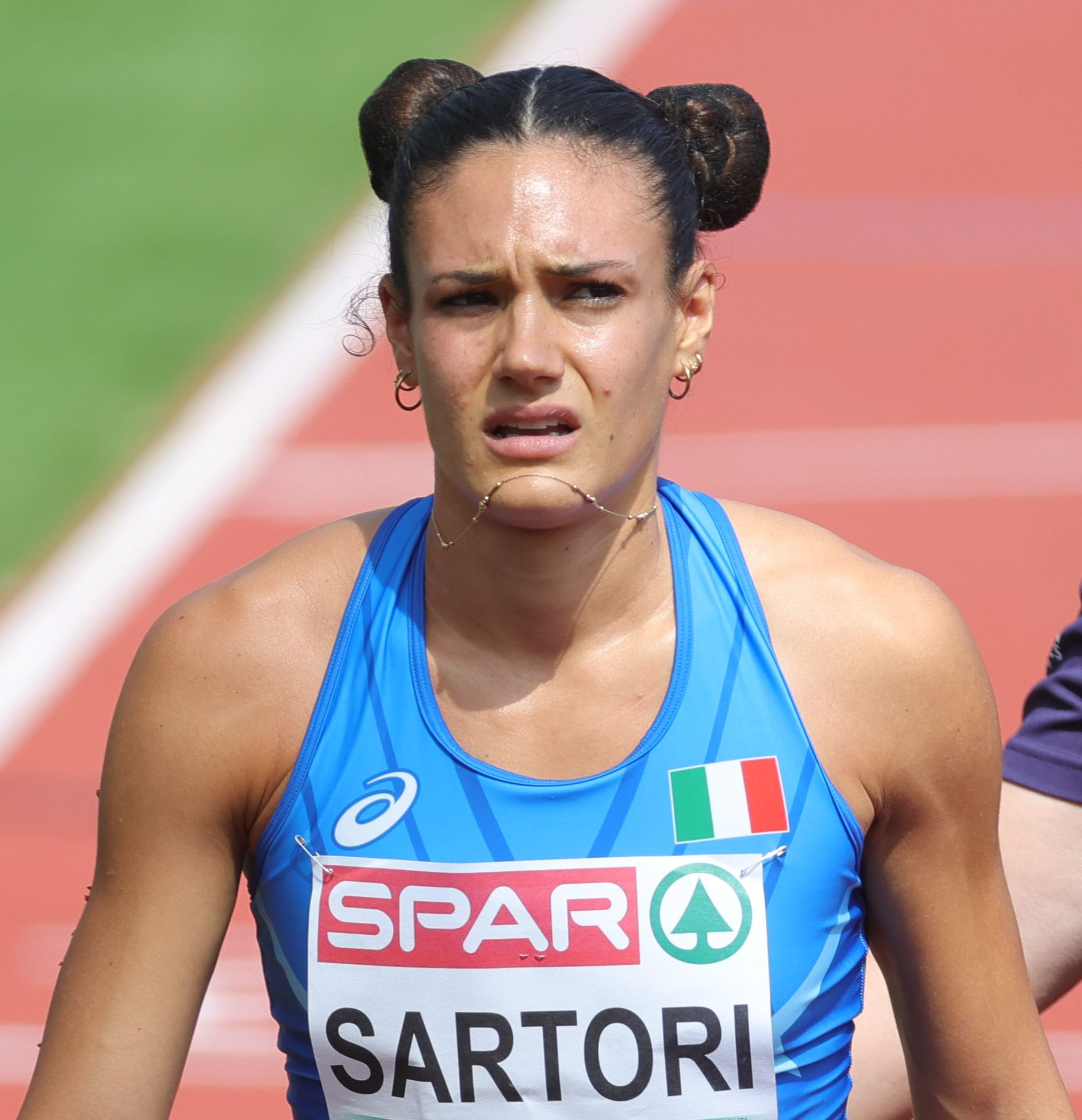

Personal information
- National team: Italy
- Born: 22 May 1997 (age 29) Bassano del Grappa, Italy
- Height: 1.73 m (5 ft 8 in)
- Weight: 57 kg (126 lb)

Sport
- Sport: Athletics
- Event: 400 m hs
- Club: Fiamme Oro Padova
- Coached by: Giorgio Ripamonti

Achievements and titles
- Personal best: 400 m hs: 54.82 (2023)
Medal record
Mediterranean Games
Gold medal – first place	2022 Oran	400 m hs

Rebecca Sartori (born 22 May 1997) is an Italian hurdler.

== Career ==
In 2022, setting in Grosseto her personal best in the 400 m hs with 55.40 she also achieved the entry standard to the cent for the participation in the 2022 World Athletics Championships in Eugene, Oregon.

== See also ==
- Italian all-time top lists - 400 metres hurdles
