= Gianna Woodruff =

Panamanian-American hurdler (born 1993)

Gianna Woodruff OLY
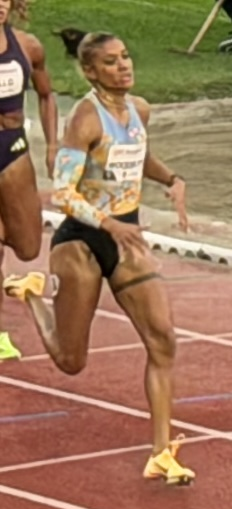

Personal information
- Full name: Gianna Ursula Woodruff Washington
- Nationality: American, Panamanian
- Born: 18 November 1993 (age 32) Santa Monica, California, U.S.
- Education: University of Southern California; University of Washington
- Height: 1.70 m (5 ft 7 in)
- Weight: 57 kg (126 lb)

Sport
- Country: Panama
- Sport: Athletics
- Event: 400 metres hurdles
- College team: Washington Huskies
Medal record
Women's athletics
Representing Panama
Pan American Games
Gold medal – first place	2023 Santiago	400 m hurdles
Central American and Caribbean Games
Gold medal – first place	2026 Santo Domingo	400 m hurdles
Silver medal – second place	2023 San Salvador	400 m hurdles
South American Games
Gold medal – first place	2026 Santa Fe	400 m hurdles
Bronze medal – third place	2018 Cochabamba	400 m hurdles

Gianna Ursula Woodruff Washington (born 18 November 1993) is a track and field athlete specializing in the 400 metres hurdles. Born in the United States, she represented Panama at the delayed 2020 Tokyo Olympics at the 2024 Summer Olympics. She is the 2023 Pan American Games champion in the 400 metres hurdles.

== Career ==
Woodruff began athletics when she was five years old. She began representing Panama at international competitions in 2016 to honor her mother's Panamanian heritage. She won the silver medal in the 400 metres hurdles at the 2016 Ibero-American Championships, behind Déborah Rodríguez.

Woodruff won the gold medal at the 2017 South American Championships with a championships record time of 56.04 seconds. She competed at her first World Championships in 2017 and advanced into the semifinals, finishing 22nd. She won a bronze medal at the 2018 South American Games.

Woodruff finished second to Melissa Gonzalez at the 2019 South American Championships. She then represented Panama at the 2019 Pan American Games and advanced into the final, finishing seventh. At the 2019 World Athletics Championships, she advanced into the semifinals and finished 19th.

Woodruff represented Panama at the 2020 Summer Olympics and improved her own South American record with a time of 54.22 seconds in the semi-finals and finished seventh in the final. At the 2022 Bolivarian Games, she won the gold medal with a Bolivarian Games record time of 55.32 seconds. At the 2022 World Athletics Championships, she advanced into the final by breaking her own South American record with a time of 53.69 seconds. She then finished seventh in the final.

At the 2023 Central American and Caribbean Games, Woodruff finished second, behind Zurian Hechavarría. She then finished 15th in the semifinals at the 2023 World Athletics Championships. She won a gold medal at the 2023 Pan American Games with a time of 56.44 seconds. She was originally disqualified due to knocking over a hurdle with the front of her lead foot, but a video review confirmed she hit the hurdle with the back of her foot. She became the first woman to win a Pan American Games gold medal in athletics.

Woodruff represented Panama at the 2024 Summer Olympics but failed to advance from the repechage round. She won the 400 metres hurdles gold medal at the 2025 South American Championships. At the 2025 World Athletics Championships, she finished second in the semifinals, behind Femke Bol, and broke her own South American record with a time of 52.66 seconds. She went on to finish fifth in the final with a time of 53.34.

== Personal life ==
Woodruff was born in Santa Monica, California. She graduated from the University of Washington with a degree in sociology in 2015 and went on to earn a Master of Social Work at the University of Southern California. Between 2017 and 2021, she coached cross country and track and field at Harvard-Westlake School.

== International competitions ==
Representing Panama
Year	Competition	Venue	Position	Event	Time	Notes
2016	Ibero-American Championships	Rio de Janeiro, Brazil	2nd	400 m hurdles	57.34	
2017	South American Championships	Asunción, Paraguay	1st	400 m hurdles	56.04	
2017	World Championships	London, United Kingdom	22nd (sf)	400 m hurdles	57.32	
2017	Bolivarian Games	Santa Marta, Colombia	1st	400 m hurdles	58.06	
2018	South American Games	Cochabamba, Bolivia	3rd	400 m hurdles	57.68	
2018	Central American and Caribbean Games	Barranquilla, Colombia	6th	400 m hurdles	55.60	
2019	South American Championships	Lima, Peru	2nd	400 m hurdles	56.76	
2019	Pan American Games	Lima, Peru	7th	400 m hurdles	57.20	
2019	World Championships	Doha, Qatar	19th (sf)	400 m hurdles	55.61	
2021	Olympic Games	Tokyo, Japan	7th	400 m hurdles	55.84	54.22 sf AR
2022	Bolivarian Games	Valledupar, Colombia	1st	400 m hurdles	55.32	
2022	World Championships	Eugene, United States	7th	400 m hurdles	54.75	
2023	Central American and Caribbean Games	San Salvador, El Salvador	2nd	400 m hurdles	56.15	
2023	World Championships	Budapest, Hungary	15th (sf)	400 m hurdles	54.71	
2023	Pan American Games	Santiago, Chile	1st	400 m hurdles	56.44	
2024	Olympic Games	Paris, France	7th (rep)	400 m hurdles	55.10	
2025	South American Championships	Mar del Plata, Argentina	1st	400 m hurdles	56.57	
2025	World Championships	Tokyo, Japan	5th	400 m hurdles	53.34	
2025	Central American Games	Quetzaltenango, Guatemala	1st	400 m hurdles	55.65	
2025	Central American Games	Quetzaltenango, Guatemala	2nd	4 × 400 m relay	3:39.61	
2026	Central American and Caribbean Games	Santo Domingo, Dominican Republic	1st	400 m hurdles	53.98	
2026	World Ultimate Championship	Budapest, Hungary	7th	400 m hurdles	53.89	
2026	South American Games	Santa Fe, Argentina	1st	400 m hurdles	54.11	

== Personal bests ==
All information taken from World Athletics profile.

- 200 metres – 23.88 (+1.4 m/s, Irvine, CA 2018)
- 400 metres – 52.78 (Austin, TX 2021) NR
- 400 metres hurdles – 52.66 (Tokyo, Japan 2025

Indoor

- 60 metres – 7.65 (Seattle, WA 2015)
- 200 metres – 24.67 (Albuquerque, NM 2014)
- 400 metres – 57.17 (Portland, OR 2016)
