= 2011 World Youth Championships in Athletics – Girls' 400 metres hurdles =

Girls' 400 metres hurdles at the 2011 World Youth Championships in Athletics
- Venue: Stadium Lille Métropole
- Dates: 6 July (heats); 7 July (semifinal); 9 July (final)
- Competitors: 35
- Winning time: 57.93 WYL

Medalists
gold medal	Nnenya Hailey	United States
silver medal	Sarah Carli	Australia
bronze medal	Zurian Hechavarría	Cuba

The girls' 400 metres hurdles at the 2011 World Youth Championships in Athletics was held at the Stadium Lille Métropole on 6, 7 and 9 July.

== Medalists ==
Gold	Silver	Bronze
Nnenya Hailey; United States	Sarah Carli; Australia	Zurian Hechavarría; Cuba

== Records ==
Prior to the competition, the following records were as follows.

World Youth Best	Leslie Maxie (USA)	55.20	San Jose, United States]	9 June 1984
Championship Record	Ebony Collins (USA)	55.96	Marrakesh, Morocco	15 July 2005
World Youth Leading	Ann Nwogu (NGR)	58.51	Calabar, Nigeria	25 June 2011

== Heats ==
Qualification rule: first 4 of each heat (Q) plus the 4 fastest times (q) qualified.

=== Heat 1 ===
Rank	Lane	Name	Nationality	Time	Notes
1	3	Izelle Neuhoff	South Africa	59.97	Q
2	2	Vilde Svortevik	Norway	1:00.57	Q
3	5	Eva Trošt	Slovenia	1:01.10	Q
4	4	Andreea Cojocaru	Romania	1:01.73	Q
5	6	Elizaveta Anikienko	Russia	1:02.15	q
6	1	Salomé Pracht-Kautz	France	1:02.22	q
7	7	Zhilan Salah Mahmood	Iraq	1:11.96	

=== Heat 2 ===
Rank	Lane	Name	Nationality	Time	Notes
1	1	Amber Bryant-Brock	United States	1:01.13	Q
2	5	Zurian Hechavarría	Cuba	1:01.85	Q
3	6	Marina Swanepoel	South Africa	1:02.24	Q
4	2	Maruša Mišmaš	Slovenia	1:02.26	Q
5	3	Chloe Jamieson	Australia	1:02.31	
6	7	Anastassiya Ovsekova	Kazakhstan	1:03.73	
7	4	María Cristina Martínez	Mexico	1:04.20	

=== Heat 3 ===
Rank	Lane	Name	Nationality	Time	Notes
1	1	Sarah Carli	Australia	59.06	Q, PB
2	3	Kernesha Spann	Trinidad and Tobago	59.96	Q
3	7	Tasabih Mohamed El Sayed	Sudan	59.98	Q
4	4	Minori Tanaka	Japan	1:00.18	Q
5	6	Émeline Bauwe	France	1:01.20	q, PB
6	2	Nóra Zajovics	Hungary	1:06.79	
-	5	Christine Salterberg	Germany	DQ	

=== Heat 4 ===
Rank	Lane	Name	Nationality	Time	Notes
1	5	Sage Watson	Canada	1:00.19	Q
2	3	Katsiaryna Verameyenka	Belarus	1:00.39	Q
3	1	Hayley McLean	Great Britain	1:00.85	Q
4	4	Oona Hujanen	Finland	1:01.32	Q
5	6	Yuke Wang	China	1:03.43	
6	7	Maryia Roshchyn	Spain	1:03.52	
7	2	Bettina Raffalt	Austria	1:03.77	

=== Heat 5 ===
Rank	Lane	Name	Nationality	Time	Notes
1	5	Nnenya Hailey	United States	58.71	Q
2	2	Aya Takizawa	Japan	59.86	Q
3	4	Ashley Taylor	Canada	1:00.38	Q, PB
4	1	Karolina Pahlitzsch	Germany	1:00.91	Q
5	3	Megan Kiely	Ireland	1:01.76	q
6	6	Dihia Haddar	Algeria	1:02.69	
7	7	Durdona Turabekova	Uzbekistan	1:06.14	

== Semifinals ==
Qualification rule: first 2 of each heat (Q) plus the 2 fastest times (q) qualified.

=== Heat 1 ===
Rank	Lane	Name	Nationality	Time	Notes
1	5	Sage Watson	Canada	59.98	Q
2	6	Zurian Hechavarría	Cuba	1:00.18	Q
3	8	Minori Tanaka	Japan	1:00.19	
4	3	Izelle Neuhoff	South Africa	1:00.37	
5	7	Eva Trošt	Slovenia	1:01.18	
6	4	Vilde Svortevik	Norway	1:02.16	
7	2	Émeline Bauwe	France	1:02.28	
8	1	Megan Kiely	Ireland	1:03.23	

=== Heat 2 ===
Rank	Lane	Name	Nationality	Time	Notes
1	3	Nnenya Hailey	United States	58.44	Q, WYL
2	7	Hayley McLean	Great Britain	58.74	Q, PB
3	6	Aya Takizawa	Japan	59.18	q, PB
4	5	Kernesha Spann	Trinidad and Tobago	1:00.26	
5	4	Ashley Taylor	Canada	1:00.42	
6	8	Oona Hujanen	Finland	1:01.43	
7	1	Andreea Cojocaru	Romania	1:02.70	
8	2	Salomé Pracht-Kautz	France	1:03.13	

=== Heat 3 ===
Rank	Lane	Name	Nationality	Time	Notes
1	5	Tasabih Mohamed El Sayed	Sudan	59.64	Q, PB
2	4	Sarah Carli	Australia	59.67	Q
3	6	Katsiaryna Veremeyenka	Belarus	59.97	q
4	3	Amber Bryant-Brock	United States	1:00.18	
5	1	Elizaveta Anikienko	Russia	1:00.51	
6	7	Marina Swanepoel	South Africa	1:02.11	
7	8	Karolina Pahlitzsch	Germany	1:02.32	
8	2	Maruša Mišmaš	Slovenia	1:02.45	

== Final ==
Rank	Lane	Name	Nationality	Time	Notes
1st place, gold medalist(s)	5	Nnenya Hailey	United States	57.93	WYL
2nd place, silver medalist(s)	8	Sarah Carli	Australia	58.05	PB
3rd place, bronze medalist(s)	7	Zurian Hechavarría	Cuba	58.37	PB
4	1	Aya Takizawa	Japan	58.80	PB
5	3	Tasabih Mohamed El Sayed	Sudan	58.91	PB
6	6	Hayley McLean	Great Britain	58.94	
7	2	Katsiaryna Veremeyenka	Belarus	59.76	PB
8	4	Sage Watson	Canada	1:01.04	
