= Athletics at the 2019 Pan American Games – Women's 400 metres hurdles =

Women's 400 metres hurdles at the 2019 Pan American Games
- Venue: Athletics Stadium
- Dates: August 6–8
- Competitors: 15 from 13 nations
- Winning time: 55.16

Medalists
Gold medal	Sage Watson	Canada
Silver medal	Anna Cockrell	United States
Bronze medal	Rushell Clayton	Jamaica

The women's 400 metres hurdles competition of the athletics events at the 2019 Pan American Games will take place between the 6 and 8 of August at the 2019 Pan American Games Athletics Stadium. The defending Pan American Games champion is Shamier Little from the United States.

== Summary ==
Running unobtrusively on the outside, Anna Cockrell pushed out to an early lead down the backstretch. Through the final turn Zurian Hechaverría asserted herself, pulling ahead, with Sage Watson the closes competitor over a stride behind. Watson pulled even as they cleared the 9th hurdle, but upon landing Watson exploded ahead as Hechaverría was swimming in mud. Rushell Clayton was the closest chaser as they ran for home, but she wasn't making up any ground on Watson's lead. Watson went on to an easy victory in 55.16. Cockrell made a late rush to nip Clayton at the line for silver.

== Records ==
Prior to this competition, the existing world and Pan American Games records were as follows:

World record	Yuliya Pechenkina (RUS)	52.34	Tula, Russia	August 8, 2003
Pan American Games record	Daimí Pernía (CUB)	53.44	Winnipeg, Canada	July 28, 1999

== Schedule ==
Date	Time	Round
August 6, 2019	16:15	Semifinal
August 8, 2019	17:55	Final

== Results ==
All times shown are in seconds.

KEY:	q	Fastest non-qualifiers	Q	Qualified	NR	National record	PB	Personal best	SB	Seasonal best	DQ	Disqualified

=== Semifinal ===
Qualification: First 3 in each heat (Q) and next 2 fastest (q) qualified for the final. The results were as follows:

Rank	Heat	Name	Nationality	Time	Notes
1	1	Zurian Hechavarría	Cuba	55.00	Q, PB
2	1	Rushell Clayton	Jamaica	55.93	Q
3	1	Anna Cockrell	United States	56.04	Q
4	2	Grace Claxton	Puerto Rico	56.30	Q, SB
5	2	Sage Watson	Canada	56.37	Q
6	2	Ronda Whyte	Jamaica	56.47	Q
7	2	Tia-Adana Belle	Barbados	56.53	q
8	2	Gianna Woodruff	Panama	56.70	q
9	2	Melissa Gonzalez	Colombia	56.78	
10	1	Gabriella Scott	Puerto Rico	56.88	
11	1	Sparkle McKnight	Trinidad and Tobago	57.04	
12	1	Kimberly Cardoza	Peru	58.04	NR
13	2	Reanda Richards	Saint Kitts and Nevis	59.42	
14	1	Katrina Seymour	Bahamas	1:00.71	
15	1	Fiorella Chiappe y Madsen	Argentina	1:01.42	

=== Final ===
The results were as follows:

Rank	Lane	Name	Nationality	Time	Notes
1st place, gold medalist(s)	6	Sage Watson	Canada	55.16	SB
2nd place, silver medalist(s)	8	Anna Cockrell	United States	55.50	
3rd place, bronze medalist(s)	4	Rushell Clayton	Jamaica	55.53	
4	5	Zurian Hechavarría	Cuba	55.85	
5	3	Tia-Adana Belle	Barbados	55.93	
6	7	Grace Claxton	Puerto Rico	56.04	SB
7	2	Gianna Woodruff	Panama	57.20	
8	9	Ronda Whyte	Jamaica	57.42	
