= 2014 World Junior Championships in Athletics – Women's 400 metres hurdles =

The women's 400 metres hurdles event at the 2014 World Junior Championships in Athletics was held in Eugene, Oregon, USA, at Hayward Field on 24, 25 and 26 July.

== Medalists ==
Gold	Shamier Little; United States
Silver	Shona Richards; United Kingdom
Bronze	Jade Miller; United States

== Records ==
Standing records prior to the 2014 World Junior Championships in Athletics
World Junior Record	Wang Xing (CHN)	54.40	Nanjing, China	21 October 2005
Championship Record	Lashinda Demus (USA)	54.70	Kingston, Jamaica	19 July 2002
World Junior Leading	Shamier Little (USA)	55.07	Eugene, United States	13 June 2014
Broken records during the 2014 World Junior Championships in Athletics

== Results ==
=== Final ===
26 July
Start time: 16:08 Temperature: 30 °C Humidity: 31 %

Rank	Name	Nationality	Lane	Reaction Time	Time	Notes
1st place, gold medalist(s)	Shamier Little	United States	5	0.213	55.66	
2nd place, silver medalist(s)	Shona Richards	United Kingdom	6	0.192	56.16	NJR
3rd place, bronze medalist(s)	Jade Miller	United States	3	0.174	56.22	PB
4	Zurian Hechavarría	Cuba	4	0.308	56.89	NJR
5	Mariam Abdul-Rashid	Canada	2	0.238	57.42	PB
6	Genekee Leith	Jamaica	8	0.237	58.33	
7	Ayomide Folorunso	Italy	7	0.272	58.34	PB
8	Joan Medjid	France	1	0.185	58.84	

=== Semifinals ===
25 July
First 2 in each heat (Q) and the next 2 fastest (q) advance to the Final

==== Summary ====
Rank	Name	Nationality	Time	Notes
1	Shona Richards	United Kingdom	57.08	Q
2	Shamier Little	United States	57.18	Q
3	Jade Miller	United States	57.28	Q
4	Mariam Abdul-Rashid	Canada	57.89	q PB
5	Zurian Hechavarría	Cuba	58.03	Q PB
6	Genekee Leith	Jamaica	58.05	Q PB
7	Joan Medjid	France	58.46	q
8	Ayomide Folorunso	Italy	58.47	Q PB
9	Tia-Adana Belle	Barbados	58.59	
10	Jana Reissová	Czech Republic	59.35	
11	Tetiana Melnyk	Ukraine	59.37	
12	Dihia Haddar	Algeria	59.40	
13	Akiko Ito	Japan	1:00.11	
14	Ashley Taylor	Canada	1:00.12	
15	Maryia Roshchyn	Spain	1:00.37	
16	Alena Hrusoci	Croatia	1:00.44	
17	Jessica Turner	United Kingdom	1:00.39	
18	Ella Solin	Australia	1:00.62	
19	Laura Gläsner	Germany	1:00.72	
20	Jackie Baumann	Germany	1:00.87	
21	Valentina Cavalleri	Italy	1:00.98	
22	Lenka Svobodová	Czech Republic	1:01.78	
23	Nenah de Coninck	Belgium	1:02.33	
24	Aneja Simončič	Slovenia	1:02.51	

==== Details ====
First 2 in each heat (Q) and the next 2 fastest (q) advance to the Final

===== Semifinal 1 =====
26 July
Start time: 19:06 Temperature: 28 °C Humidity: 33%

Rank	Name	Nationality	Lane	Reaction Time	Time	Notes
1	Zurian Hechavarría	Cuba	3	0.177	58.03	Q PB
2	Genekee Leith	Jamaica	4	0.279	58.05	Q PB
3	Joan Medjid	France	5	0.176	58.46	q
4	Tia-Adana Belle	Barbados	6	0.195	58.59	
5	Akiko Ito	Japan	1	0.196	1:00.11	
6	Ashley Taylor	Canada	7	0.205	1:00.12	
7	Maryia Roshchyn	Spain	8	0.231	1:00.37	
8	Valentina Cavalleri	Italy	2	0.189	1:00.98	

===== Semifinal 2 =====
26 July
Start time: 19:14 Temperature: 27 °C Humidity: 37%

Rank	Name	Nationality	Lane	Reaction Time	Time	Notes
1	Shona Richards	United Kingdom	3	0.146	57.08	Q
2	Jade Miller	United States	4	0.216	57.28	Q
3	Mariam Abdul-Rashid	Canada	5	0.213	57.89	q PB
4	Jana Reissová	Czech Republic	6	0.218	59.35	
5	Alena Hrusoci	Croatia	2	0.236	1:00.44	
6	Jackie Baumann	Germany	8	0.242	1:00.87	
7	Nenah de Coninck	Belgium	7	0.233	1:02.33	
8	Aneja Simončič	Slovenia	1	0.219	1:02.51	

===== Semifinal 3 =====
26 July
Start time: 19:21 Temperature: 27 °C Humidity: 37%

Rank	Name	Nationality	Lane	Reaction Time	Time	Notes
1	Shamier Little	United States	4	0.274	57.18	Q
2	Ayomide Folorunso	Italy	3	0.213	58.47	Q PB
3	Tetiana Melnyk	Ukraine	5	0.198	59.37	
4	Dihia Haddar	Algeria	6	0.225	59.40	
5	Jessica Turner	United Kingdom	8	0.209	1:00.39	
6	Ella Solin	Australia	2	0.221	1:00.62	
7	Laura Gläsner	Germany	7	0.249	1:00.72	
8	Lenka Svobodová	Czech Republic	1	0.252	1:01.78	

=== Heats ===
24 July
First 4 in each heat (Q) and the next 4 fastest (q) advance to the Semi-Finals

==== Summary ====
Rank	Name	Nationality	Time	Notes
1	Jade Miller	United States	57.85	Q
2	Shamier Little	United States	57.94	Q
3	Zurian Hechavarría	Cuba	58.21	Q PB
4	Shona Richards	United Kingdom	58.37	Q
5	Mariam Abdul-Rashid	Canada	58.60	Q
6	Ayomide Folorunso	Italy	58.79	Q
7	Dihia Haddar	Algeria	58.97	Q SB
8	Tia-Adana Belle	Barbados	59.05	Q
9	Jana Reissová	Czech Republic	59.14	Q
10	Tetiana Melnyk	Ukraine	59.38	Q
11	Jessica Turner	United Kingdom	59.58	Q
12	Genekee Leith	Jamaica	59.59	Q
13	Joan Medjid	France	59.63	Q
14	Maryia Roshchyn	Spain	59.67	Q
15	Laura Gläsner	Germany	59.78	Q
16	Ashley Taylor	Canada	59.82	Q
16	Valentina Cavalleri	Italy	59.82	q PB
18	Lenka Svobodová	Czech Republic	59.97	Q
19	Akiko Ito	Japan	1:00.06	q
20	Nenah de Coninck	Belgium	1:00.17	Q
21	Jackie Baumann	Germany	1:00.22	Q
22	Ella Solin	Australia	1:00.27	q
23	Alena Hrusoci	Croatia	1:00.66	q
24	Tatiana Sánchez	Colombia	1:00.68	
25	Daniela Ledecká	Slovakia	1:00.75	
26	Aneja Simončič	Slovenia	1:00.77	Q
27	Julija Praprotnik	Slovenia	1:00.95	
28	Mesha Newbold	Bahamas	1:01.24	
29	Imola Boglarka Blazer	Romania	1:01.65	
30	Alexandra Tierney	Thailand	1:01.96	
31	Andreea Timofei	Romania	1:02.20	
32	Talia Thompson	Bahamas	1:02.33	
33	Büsra Yildirim	Turkey	1:02.40	
34	Meaza Kebede	Ethiopia	1:03.53	
35	Virginia Villalba	Ecuador	1:03.73	
36	D'Jané Kriedemann	South Africa	1:07.38	

==== Details ====
First 4 in each heat (Q) and the next 4 fastest (q) advance to the Semi-Finals

===== Heat 1 =====
26 July
Start time: 12:44 Temperature: 21 °C Humidity: 53%

Rank	Name	Nationality	Lane	Reaction Time	Time	Notes
1	Jade Miller	United States	5	0.203	57.85	Q
2	Mariam Abdul-Rashid	Canada	4	0.204	58.60	Q
3	Jana Reissová	Czech Republic	3	0.201	59.14	Q
4	Laura Gläsner	Germany	8	0.276	59.78	Q
5	Valentina Cavalleri	Italy	7	0.221	59.82	q PB
6	Alena Hrusoci	Croatia	2	0.247	1:00.66	q
7	Daniela Ledecká	Slovakia	6	0.164	1:00.75	

===== Heat 2 =====
26 July
Start time: 12:50 Temperature: 21 °C Humidity: 53%

Rank	Name	Nationality	Lane	Reaction Time	Time	Notes
1	Tetiana Melnyk	Ukraine	6	0.174	59.38	Q
2	Joan Medjid	France	4	0.211	59.63	Q
3	Nenah de Coninck	Belgium	2	0.179	1:00.17	Q
4	Aneja Simončič	Slovenia	5	0.196	1:00.77	Q
5	Mesha Newbold	Bahamas	3	0.219	1:01.24	
6	Alexandra Tierney	Thailand	8	0.204	1:01.96	
7	Meaza Kebede	Ethiopia	7	0.227	1:03.53	
8	D'Jané Kriedemann	South Africa	1	0.187	1:07.38	

===== Heat 3 =====
26 July
Start time: 12:56 Temperature: 21 °C Humidity: 53%

Rank	Name	Nationality	Lane	Reaction Time	Time	Notes
1	Zurian Hechavarría	Cuba	8	0.215	58.21	Q PB
2	Shona Richards	United Kingdom	3	0.163	58.37	Q
3	Ayomide Folorunso	Italy	4	0.199	58.79	Q
4	Maryia Roshchyn	Spain	5	0.182	59.67	Q
5	Tatiana Sánchez	Colombia	2	0.190	1:00.68	
6	Andreea Timofei	Romania	6	0.213	1:02.20	
7	Virginia Villalba	Ecuador	7	0.208	1:03.73	

===== Heat 4 =====
26 July
Start time: 13:02 Temperature: 21 °C Humidity: 53%

Rank	Name	Nationality	Lane	Reaction Time	Time	Notes
1	Tia-Adana Belle	Barbados	2	0.193	59.05	Q
2	Genekee Leith	Jamaica	7	0.422	59.59	Q
3	Ashley Taylor	Canada	3	0.173	59.82	Q
4	Lenka Svobodová	Czech Republic	4	0.146	59.97	Q
5	Akiko Ito	Japan	8	0.208	1:00.06	q
6	Julija Praprotnik	Slovenia	5	0.300	1:00.95	
7	Talia Thompson	Bahamas	6	0.183	1:02.33	

===== Heat 5 =====
26 July
Start time: 13:08 Temperature: 21 °C Humidity: 53%

Rank	Name	Nationality	Lane	Reaction Time	Time	Notes
1	Shamier Little	United States	3	0.222	57.94	Q
2	Dihia Haddar	Algeria	7	0.296	58.97	Q SB
3	Jessica Turner	United Kingdom	2	0.207	59.58	Q
4	Jackie Baumann	Germany	4	0.316	1:00.22	Q
5	Ella Solin	Australia	8	0.268	1:00.27	q
6	Imola Boglarka Blazer	Romania	6	0.214	1:01.65	
7	Büsra Yildirim	Turkey	5	0.233	1:02.40	

== Participation ==
According to an unofficial count, 36 athletes from 27 countries participated in the event.

- Algeria (1)
- Australia (1)
- Bahamas (2)
- Barbados (1)
- Belgium (1)
- Canada (2)
- Colombia (1)
- Croatia (1)
- Cuba (1)
- Czech Republic (2)
- Ecuador (1)
- Ethiopia (1)
- France (1)
- Germany (2)
- Italy (2)
- Jamaica (1)
- Japan (1)
- Romania (2)
- Slovakia (1)
- Slovenia (2)
- South Africa (1)
- Spain (1)
- Thailand (1)
- Turkey (1)
- Ukraine (1)
- United Kingdom (2)
- United States (2)
