= Athletics at the 2013 Canada Summer Games =

Athletics at the 2013 Canada Summer Games was in Sherbrooke, Quebec at the Université de Sherbrooke Stadium. It was held from the 12 to 16 August. There were 54 events of athletics.

== Medal table ==
The following is the medal table for athletics at the 2013 Canada Summer Games.

* Host nation ( Quebec)

| Rank | Nation | Gold | Silver | Bronze | Total |
| Totals (0 entries) | | 0 | 0 | 0 | 0 |

The following medal table provides a statistical analysis by subtracting, focusing, and combining paralympic and Special Olympic events from the total medals counted. This table sorts by total medals minus PSO.

Key

PSO = Paralympic and Special Olympic

| Province | Minus PSO | | | | PSO | | | | Combined | | | |
|---|---|---|---|---|---|---|---|---|---|---|---|---|
| Province | Gold | Silver | Bronze | Total | Gold | Silver | Bronze | Total | Gold | Silver | Bronze | Total |
| Ontario | 15 | 10 | 11 | 36 | 6 | 6 | 1 | 13 | 21 | 16 | 12 | 49 |
| Alberta | 9 | 6 | 5 | 21 | 0 | 2 | 0 | 2 | 9 | 8 | 5 | 23 |
| Nova Scotia | 5 | 1 | 3 | 9 | 1 | 1 | 2 | 4 | 6 | 2 | 5 | 13 |
| British Columbia | 4 | 8 | 5 | 17 | 1 | 1 | 2 | 4 | 5 | 9 | 7 | 21 |
| Quebec | 3 | 6 | 7 | 16 | 4 | 2 | 5 | 11 | 7 | 8 | 12 | 27 |
| New Brunswick | 2 | 1 | 3 | 5 | 0 | 3 | 0 | 3 | 2 | 4 | 3 | 9 |
| Saskatchewan | 1 | 3 | 4 | 8 | 2 | 0 | 3 | 5 | 3 | 3 | 7 | 13 |
| Manitoba | 1 | 3 | 2 | 6 | 0 | 0 | 0 | 0 | 1 | 3 | 2 | 6 |
| Newfoundland and Labrador | 0 | 0 | 0 | 0 | 0 | 0 | 1 | 1 | 0 | 0 | 1 | 1 |
| TOTAL | | | | | | | | | | | | |

== Results ==
=== Men ===
| Event | Gold | | Silver | | Bronze | |
|---|---|---|---|---|---|---|
| 100 m | Andre De Grasse; Ontario | 10.49 | Aaron Bowman; Ontario | 10.61 | Benjamin Williams; Alberta | 10.69 |
| 200 m | Andre De Grasse; Ontario | 21.38 | Tyler Macleod; Ontario | 21.70 | Benjamin Williams; Alberta | 21.75 |
| 400 m | Brandon McBride; Ontario | 46.18 | Ben Ayesu-Attah; British Columbia | 46.82 | Daniel Kelloway; Newfoundland and Labrador | 48.01 |
| 1,500 m | Thomas Riva; British Columbia | 3:45.87 | Lucas Bruchet; British Columbia | 3:46.91 | Sam Vincent; Manitoba | 3:47.04 |
| 5,000 m | Connor Darlington; Ontario | 14:33.56 | Matt Johnson; Saskatchewan | 14:35.22 | Emmanuel Boisvert; Quebec | 14:38.30 |
| 110 m hurdles | Ingvar Moseley; Ontario | 14.20 | Gregory MacNeill; Ontario | 14.61 | Gabriel Slyhte-Léveillé; Quebec | 14.61 |
| 400 m hurdles | Daniel Chan; Ontario | 52.11 | Sajj Alhaddad; Ontario | 52.42 | Gabriel Slyhte-Léveillé; Quebec | 52.49 |
| 3,000 m steeplechase | Mattias Wolter; Nova Scotia | 8:58.48 | Gareth Hadfield; Alberta | 9:00.22 | Justin Kent; British Columbia | 9:10.89 |
| 4 x 100 m relay | Ontario; Aaron Bowman; Andre De Grasse; Tyler Macleod; Gregory MacNeill | 40.02 | Quebec; Stevens Dorcelus; Jayme De Castro Gourdeau; Francis Molango; Brandon Smith-Drouin | 40.91 | Saskatchewan; Connor Bloom; Alex Fedyk; Preston Liebrecht; Lenny Williams | 41.09 |
| 4 x 400 m relay | Ontario; Sajj Alhaddad; Tyler Macleod; Brandon McBride; Devin Biocchi | 3:07.45 | British Columbia; Ben Ayesu-Attah; Hodson Harding; Adam Paul-Morris; Brendon Restall | 3:09.30 | Nova Scotia; Justin Blades; Pookiel McCabe; Mackenzie Munroe; Will Sandeson | 3:14.40 |
| High jump | Django Lovett; British Columbia | 2.14 m | Al Mansaray; Manitoba | 2.14 m | James Gillis; Nova Scotia | 2.08 m |
| Long jump | Jared Kerr; Ontario | 7.52 m | Stevens Dorcelus; Quebec | 7.22 m | Rob Gallaugher; British Columbia | 7.17 m |
| Triple jump | Jared Kerr; Ontario | 14.82 m | Jordan Bruce; Nova Scotia | 14.79 m | Scott Hancock; Quebec | 14.75 m |
| Pole vault | David McKay; Ontario | 4.95 m | Paul Rydberg; Manitoba | 4.50 m | Rahim Noormohamed; Quebec | 4.35 m |
| Shot put | Marc-Antoine Lafrenaye-Dugas; Quebec | 15.84 m | Nolan Machiskinic; Saskatchewan | 15.70 m | Eric Brathwaite; Ontario | 15.28 |
| Discus | Marc-Antoine Lafrenaye-Dugas; Quebec | 49.65 m | Ryan Sommer; Alberta | 48.81 m | Adam Karakolis; Ontario | 48.53 m |
| Javelin | Caleb Jones; New Brunswick | 72.42 m | John Krzyszkowski; Ontario | 68.67 m | Mitchell Quigg; New Brunswick | 66.30 m |
| Hammer throw | Adam Keenan; British Columbia | 65.96 m | Marc-Antoine Lafrenaye-Dugas; Quebec | 58.39 m | Chris Preece; Ontario | 54.30 m |
| Decathlon | Jesse Drennan; Nova Scotia | 6,612 | Mitchell Quigg; New Brunswick | 6,574 | Rostam Turner; British Columbia | 6,261 |

=== Men's Para and Special Olympic events ===
| Event | Gold | | Silver | | Bronze | |
|---|---|---|---|---|---|---|
| 100 m Special Olympics | Peter Snider; Ontario | 12.23 | Gabriel Dupuy; Quebec | 12.23 | Guillaume Bénard; Quebec | 12.91 |
| 200 m Special Olympics | Peter Snider; Ontario | 24.29 | Gabriel Dupuy; Quebec | 24.54 | Christopher Dugas; Newfoundland and Labrador | 26.19 |
| 200 m wheelchair | Jean-Philippe Maranda; Quebec | 27.87 | Isaiah Christophe; Ontario | 27.88 | Francis Hébert; Quebec | 29.33 |
| 400 m wheelchair | Michael Kahn; Ontario | 52.15 | Tristan Smyth; British Columbia | 52.44 | Jean-Philippe Maranda; Quebec | 53.91 |
| 1,500 m wheelchair | Tristan Smyth; British Columbia | 3:27.74 | Michael Kahn; Ontario | 3:27.77 | Jean-Philippe Maranda; Quebec | 3:29.15 |
| Shot put para | Ken Trudgeon; Ontario | 14.10 m | Kevin Strybosch; Ontario | 11.76 m | David Bambrick; Nova Scotia | 11.29 m |
| Discus para | Kevin Strybosch; Ontario | 45.95 m | Ken Trudgeon; Ontario | 35.19 m | David Bambrick; Nova Scotia | 31.25 m |

=== Women ===
| Event | Gold | | Silver | | Bronze | |
|---|---|---|---|---|---|---|
| 100 m | Isatu Fofanah; Alberta | 12.02 | Shaina Harrison; Ontario | 12.17 | Amelia Brohman; Ontario | 12.25 |
| 200 m | Amelia Brohman; Ontario | 24.15 | Isatu Fofanah; Alberta | 24.20 | Brenna Thomson; Ontario | 24.45 |
| 400 m | Sage Watson; Alberta | 54.05 | Marie St-Pierre; Quebec | 55.06 | Katherine Surin; Quebec | 55.67 |
| 1,500 m | Julia Zrinyi; Manitoba | 4:25.75 | Maria Bernard; Alberta | 4:26.36 | Genevieve Lalonde; New Brunswick | 4:26.69 |
| 5,000 m | Maria Bernard; Alberta | 17:33.44 | Jaimie Phelan; Ontario | 17:35.38 | Sarah MacPherson; New Brunswick | 17:35.72 |
| 100 m hurdles | Michelle Young; Saskatchewan | 13.81 | Jenna Mann; Saskatchewan | 13.92 | Shaunie Morrison; Alberta | 14.04 |
| 400 m hurdles | Sage Watson; Alberta | 58.46 | Yanique Bennett; Ontario | 59.77 | Chanel Marion; Ontario | 1:00.49 |
| 2,000 m steeplechase | Genevieve Lalonde; New Brunswick | 6:32.45 | Erin Teschuk; Manitoba | 6:45.40 | Regan Yee; British Columbia | 6:50.98 |
| 4 x 100 m relay | Quebec; Sophie Arsenault; Émy Béliveau; Caroline Morin-Houde; Marie St-Pierre | 45.74 | Alberta; Isatu Fofanah; Katrina Martin; Joy Spearchief-Morris; Leah Walkeden | 46.05 | Saskatchewan; Jenna Mann; Merissa Margetts; Katrin Ritchie; Michelle Young | 46.39 |
| 4 x 400 m relay | Alberta; Rachel Francois; Katrina Martin; Sage Watson; Jenna Westaway | 3:38.46 | British Columbia; Casey Atkin; Meghan Palesch; Sarah Sawatzky; Raquel Tjernagel | 3:41.86 | Ontario; Amelia Brohman; Fiona Callender; Chanel Marion; Brenna Thomson | 3:44.74 |
| High jump | Rachel Machin; Alberta | 1.84 m | Emma Kimoto; British Columbia | 1.80 m | Rebecca Haworth; Nova Scotia | 1.73 m |
| Long jump | Rachel Machin; Alberta | 5.91 m | Magali Roche; Quebec | 5.84 m | Joy Becker; Manitoba | 5.81 m |
| Triple jump | Caroline Ehrhardt; Ontario | 12.54 m | Julia Wallace; Ontario | 12.50 m | Tiana Pisoni; Alberta | 11.81 m |
| Pole vault | Robin Bone; Ontario | 4.01 m | Erika Fielder; Ontario | 3.75 m | Kimberly Stephenson; Alberta | 3.75 m |
| Shot put | Chelsea Whalen; Nova Scotia | 15.54m | Celine Freeman-Gibb; Ontario | 15.03m | Alex Portier-Langlois; Quebec | 14.56 |
| Discus | Agnes Esser; British Columbia | 46.16 m | Kelly Gribbons; Ontario | 44.62 m | Breanna Rak; Saskatchewan | 44.02 m |
| Javelin | Chelsea Whalen; Nova Scotia | 48.83 m | Tiffany Matteazzi; British Columbia | 47.50 m | Madi Johnston; Ontario | 46.00 m |
| Hammer throw | Samme Groeneveld; Alberta | 54.06 m | Sam Kennedy; British Columbia | 52.31 m | Lauren Stuart; British Columbia | 51.94 m |
| Heptathlon | Rachael McIntosh; Nova Scotia | 5407 | Geneviève Gagné; Quebec | 4850 | Allison Frantz; Quebec | 4636 |

=== Women's Para and Special Olympic events ===
| Event | Gold | | Silver | | Bronze | |
|---|---|---|---|---|---|---|
| 100 m Special Olympics | Lindsay Kinnear; Saskatchewan | 14.50 | Katie Saunders; Alberta | 14.53 | Jasmyn Kersey; Ontario | 14.88 |
| 200 m Special Olympics | Lindsay Kinnear; Saskatchewan | 29.61 | Katie Saunders; Alberta | 30.02 | Audrey Vincent; Quebec | 30.40 |
| 200 m wheelchair | Sarah White; Quebec | 37.69 | Veronica Coombes; New Brunswick | 39.78 | Jessica Frotten; Saskatchewan | 41.20 |
| 400 m wheelchair | Sarah White; Quebec | 1:08.55 | Veronica Coombes; New Brunswick | 1:14.16 | Jessica Frotten; Saskatchewan | 1:16.78 |
| 1,500 m wheelchair | Sarah White; Quebec | 4:32.49 | Veronica Coombes; New Brunswick | 4:41.76 | Jessica Frotten; Saskatchewan | 5:06.99 |
| Shot put para | Renee Foessel; Ontario | 9.68 m | Jessye Brockway; British Columbia | 5.81 m | Christel Robichaud; New Brunswick | |
| Discus para | Renee Foessel; Ontario | 29.78 m | Jessye Brockway; British Columbia | 18.57 m | Christel Robichaud; New Brunswick | |
