= 2013 Pan American Junior Athletics Championships =

XVII Pan American Junior Athletics Championships
- Dates: 23–25 August
- Host city: Medellín, Colombia
- Venue: Estadio Alfonso Galvis Duque
- Level: Junior
- Events: 44
- Participation: 36 nations

The 2013 Pan American Junior Championships was held at the Estadio Alfonso Galvis Duque in Medellín, Colombia, from 23 to 25 August. The competition was originally scheduled for 2–4 August in Lima, Peru. Lima was ruled out as the host and the dates were also amended in April, due to the clash with the 2013 World Games in Cali and its proximity to the 2013 World Championships in Athletics.

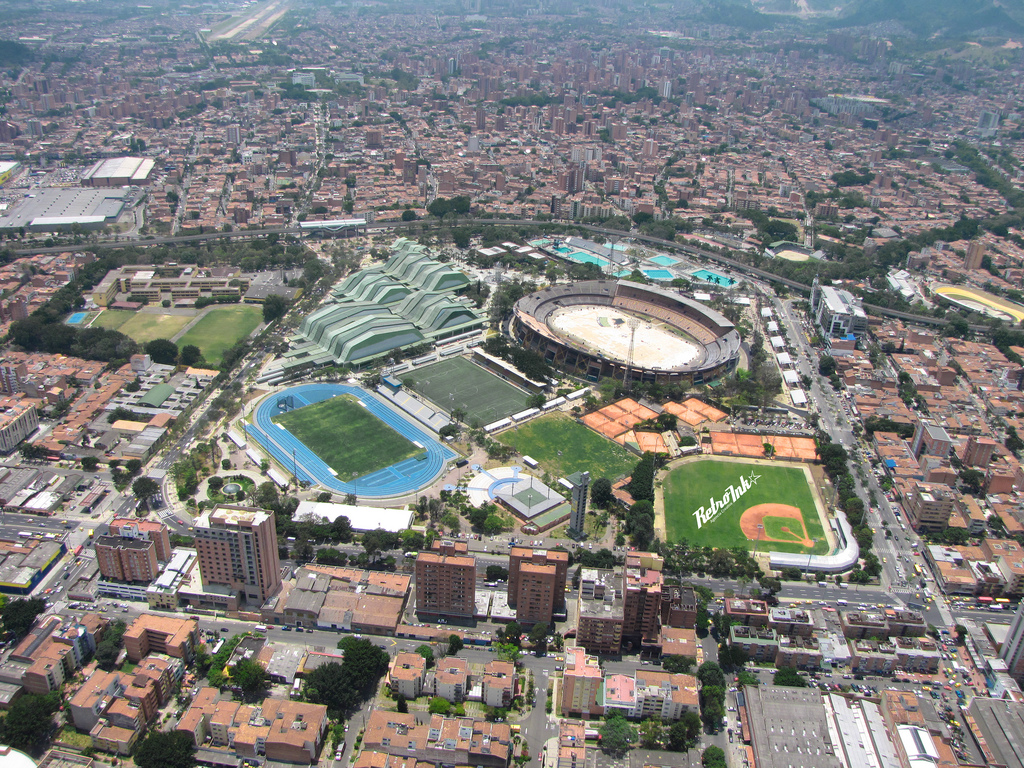
The host stadium (left) with its blue running track

The United States easily topped the medal table with fifteen gold medals and 38 medals in total, continuing their streak as the best performing nation at the championships (bar one interruption at the 2001 edition). Cuba and Canada, the other traditionally strong nations in the region, were the next best performers: Cuba won eight golds in its haul of eleven medals while Canada had the second largest total with 19 medals (six of them gold). Brazil and Mexico each took four golds and the host nation Colombia claimed twelve medals overall. Twenty-one of the 36 participating nations reached the medal table.

Two championship record marks were bettered in 2013, both of the women's field events. In the pole vault Canada's Alysha Newman and Venezuela's Robeilys Peinado both cleared 4.40 m (14 ft 5 in). Newman broke the North American junior record and Peinado improved her own Venezuelan record. American Megan Glasman was the other to break a championship record with her winning mark of 53.93 m (176 ft 11 in) in the javelin throw. Another record of note was the South American junior record of 13.42 seconds in the 110 metres hurdles, set by Colombia's Juan Carlos Moreno. Felipe dos Santos of Brazil also broke the regional junior record with his winning score of 7762 points in the decathlon.

Among the participants, two completed doubles: Arialis Gandulla Martínez was the winner of both the women's 100 metres and 200 metres while Peru's Zulema Huacasi claimed both the 3000 metres flat and steeplechase titles. Brazil had two multiple medallists in Izabela da Silva (women's discus throw winner and shot put runner-up) and Thiago do Rosário (runner-up in both the men's 1500 metres and 5000 metres). Sage Watson of Canada won the 400 metres hurdles title, a silver in the 4 × 400 m relay, and a bronze in the flat race. Ecuadorian Angela Tenorio was a minor medallist in both the women's sprints.

Several medallists from the 2013 World Youth Championships in Athletics were present. Lázaro Martínez Santrayu repeated his triple jump title and Christoff Bryan won another men's high jump medal. Peinado and Tenorio had also won medals at the youth event.

== Medal summary ==
=== Men ===
Event	Gold		Silver		Bronze	
100 metres	Zharnel Hughes (AIA)	10.31	Andre De Grasse (CAN)	10.36	Trayvon Bromell (USA)	10.44
200 metres	Reynier Mena (CUB)	20.63	Victor Mourão (BRA)	20.73	Andre De Grasse (CAN)	20.74
400 metres	Brandon McBride (CAN)	45.89	Yoandys Lescay (CUB)	45.90	Jhon Perlaza (COL)	46.42
800 metres	Bryan Martinez (MEX)	1:50.35	Miguel Cifuentes (COL)	1:51.10	Andre Colebrook (BAH)	1:51.47
1500 metres	Craig Engels (USA)	3:53.12	Thiago do Rosário (BRA)	3:54.22	Edgar Quiroz (MEX)	3:54.85
5000 metres	Edgar Quiroz (MEX)	14:44.54	Thiago do Rosário (BRA)	14:52.46	Thomas Awad (USA)	14:55.53
10,000 metres	Matt McClintock (USA)	31:12.39	Jupiter Casas (MEX)	31:20.77	Walter Colop (GUA)	31:20.98
110 m hurdles	Juan Carlos Moreno (COL)	13.42 AJR	Tony Brown (USA)	13.47	David Franco (VEN)	13.61
400 m hurdles	Khallifah Rosser (USA)	50.75	Scottie Hearns (USA)	50.96	Jefferson Carmona (COL)	51.37
3000 m steeplechase	Yuber Echeverry (COL)	9:16.37	Antoine Thibeault (CAN)	9:17.09	Nelson Blanco (COL)	9:25.57
4 × 100 m relay	United States (USA); Tevin Hester; Cameron Burrell; Riak Reese; Trayvon Bromell	39.17	Jamaica (JAM); Jevaughn Minzie; Jazeel Murphy; Antonio Henry; Odail Todd	39.68	Brazil (BRA); Rodrigo Nascimento; Victor Mourão; Luis Silva; Ricardo Souza	39.96
4 × 400 m relay	United States (USA); Marcus Chambers; Alexis Robinson; Lamar Bruton; Juan Green	3:06.57	Brazil (BRA); Alexander Russo; Jucian Pereira; Carlos Grachet; Rodrigo Nascimento	3:06.94	Canada (CAN); Nathaniel George; Christopher Green; Jordan Sherwood; Brandon McBride	3:07.61
10,000 m walk	Erwin Gonzalez (MEX)	40:36.85	Brian Pintado (ECU)	41:21.97	Kenny Martín Pérez (COL)	41:53.86
High jump	Wally Ellenson (USA)	2.16 m	Christoff Bryan (JAM)	2.16 m	Justin Fondren (USA)	2.13 m
Pole vault	Shawnacy Barber (CAN)	5.35 m	Dylan Duvio (USA)	5.20 m	Daven Murphree (USA)	4.90 m
Long jump	Higor Alves (BRA)	7.95 m	Andre Jefferson (USA)	7.92 m	Irvin Castillo (MEX)	7.48 m
Triple jump^{[a]}	Lázaro Martínez (CUB)	16.49 m	Timothy White-Edwards (USA)	16.49 m	Felix Obi (USA)	15.75 m
Shot put	Joshua Freeman (USA)	20.20 m	Coy Blair (USA)	19.69 m	Nelson Fernandes (BRA)	19.35 m
Discus throw	Hayden Reed (USA)	62.49 m	Mauricio Ortega (COL)	61.77 m	Reginald Jagers (USA)	59.30 m
Hammer throw	Diego del Real (MEX)	72.99 m	Rudy Winkler (USA)	71.79 m	Humberto Mancilla (CHI)	68.44 m
Javelin throw	Pascal Schwarz (CAY)	72.82 m	Janeil Craig (BAR)	69.38 m	John Krzyszkowski (CAN)	67.38 m
Decathlon	Felipe dos Santos (BRA)	7762 pts AJR	Abdel-Kader Hernandez (CUB)	7515 pts	Jefferson Santos (BRA)	7478 pts

- ^{[a]}Martínez and White-Edwards had the same best mark of 16.49 m but Martínez took the gold by merit of his superior second best jump (16.35 m to White-Edwards' 16.29 m).

=== Women ===
Event	Gold		Silver		Bronze	
100 metres (Wind: +2.8 m/s)	Arialis Gandulla (CUB)	11.32w	Jennifer Madu (USA)	11.37w	Angela Tenorio (ECU)	11.37w
200 metres	Arialis Gandulla (CUB)	23.27	Angela Tenorio (ECU)	23.34	Omhunique Browne (SKN)	23.48
400 metres	Courtney Okolo (USA)	52.19	Kendall Baisden (USA)	52.59	Sage Watson (CAN)	52.68
800 metres	Jenna Westaway (CAN)	2:06.94	Olicia Williams (USA)	2:08.85	Vanessa McLeod (CAN)	2:09.74
1500 metres	Julia Zrinyi (CAN)	4:36.88	Kelsey Margey (USA)	4:38.84	Arantza Flores (MEX)	4:39.85
3000 metres	Zulema Huacasi (PER)	9:42.70	Madeline McDonald (CAN)	9:56.65	Lucy Perez (PER)	10:07.76
5000 metres	Hetaria Palacios (PER)	18:11.57	Monica Garcia (COL)	18:13.83	Sunilda Lozano (PER)	18:17.75
100 m hurdles	Alexis Perry (USA)	13.56	Nicole Setterington (CAN)	13.57	Genesis Romero (VEN)	13.65 NR
400 m hurdles	Sage Watson (CAN)	56.81	Jade Miller (USA)	58.12	Jessica Gelibert (HAI)	58.20
3000 m steeplechase	Zulema Huacasi (PER)	10:28.94	Briana Nerud (USA)	10:46.88	Elisa Hernandez (MEX)	11:02.05
4 × 100 m relay	United States (USA); Morolake Akinosun; Jennifer Madu; Alexis Faulknor; Anna Holland	43.97	Canada (CAN); Deshaunda Morrison; Amelia Brohman; Nicole Setterington; Khamica Bingham	46.13	Colombia (COL); Daniela Cuellar; Janeth Largacha; Alison Mina; Jackeline Arizala	46.55
4 × 400 m relay	United States (USA); Robin Reynolds; Kendall Baisden; Olicia Williams; Courtney Okolo	3:36.48	Canada (CAN); Marie-Colombe St. Pierre; Jenna Westaway; Vanessa McLeod; Sage Watson	3:41.53	Colombia (COL); Diana Cruz; Julieth Caballero; Tatiana Sanchez; Janeth Largacha	3:44.08
10,000 m walk	Elysle Albino (BRA)	50:26.44	Sara Pulido (COL)	50:44.19	Maritza Tzul (GUA)	50:50.37
High jump	Daniellys Garay (CUB)	1.76 m	Yulimar Rojas (VEN)	1.76 m	Thea LaFond (DMA)	1.76 m
Pole vault	Alysha Newman (CAN)	4.40 m CR AJR	Robeilys Peinado (VEN)	4.40 m CR NR	Noelina Madarieta (ARG)	4.00 m
Long jump	Alexis Faulknor (USA)	6.24 m	Genesis Romero (VEN)	6.04 m	Yuliana Angulo (ECU)	6.01 m
Triple jump	Paula Ross (CUB)	13.57 m	Gabriele dos Santos (BRA)	13.35 m	Núbia Soares (BRA)	13.33 m
Shot put	Stamatia Scarvelis (USA)	15.46 m	Izabela da Silva (BRA)	14.90 m	Chase Ealey (USA)	14.88 m
Discus throw	Izabela da Silva (BRA)	54.15 m	Magdalyn Ewen (USA)	50.48 m	Maia Varela (ARG)	50.44 m
Hammer throw	Hassana Divó Liser (CUB)	60.94 m	Avana Story (USA)	57.40 m	Kayla Gallagher (CAN)	56.58 m
Javelin throw	Megan Glasman (USA)	53.93 m CR	Yulenmis Aguilar (CUB)	50.00 m	María Mello (URU)	49.07 m
Heptathlon	Yusleidys Valasquez (CUB)	5627 pts CR	Kendell Williams (USA)	5572 pts	Georgia Ellenwood (CAN)	5493 pts

== Medal table ==
* Host nation (Colombia)

Rank	Nation	Gold	Silver	Bronze	Total
1	United States	15	16	7	38
2	Cuba	8	3	0	11
3	Canada	6	6	7	19
4	Brazil	4	6	4	14
5	Mexico	4	1	4	9
6	Peru	3	0	2	5
7	Colombia*	2	4	6	12
8	Anguilla	1	0	0	1
8	Cayman Islands	1	0	0	1
10	Venezuela	0	3	2	5
11	Ecuador	0	2	2	4
12	Jamaica	0	2	0	2
13	Barbados	0	1	0	1
14	Argentina	0	0	2	2
14	Guatemala	0	0	2	2
16	Bahamas	0	0	1	1
16	Chile	0	0	1	1
16	Dominica	0	0	1	1
16	Haiti	0	0	1	1
16	Saint Kitts and Nevis	0	0	1	1
16	Uruguay	0	0	1	1
Totals (21 entries)		44	44	44	132

== Participation ==
- Anguilla
- Antigua and Barbuda
- Argentina
- Bahamas
- Barbados
- Bermuda
- Bolivia
- Brazil
- British Virgin Islands
- Canada
- Cayman Islands
- Chile
- Colombia
- Costa Rica
- Cuba
- Curaçao
- Dominica
- Ecuador
- El Salvador
- Grenada
- Guatemala
- Haiti
- Jamaica
- Mexico
- Panama
- Paraguay
- Peru
- Puerto Rico
- Dominican Republic
- Saint Kitts and Nevis
- Saint Vincent and the Grenadines
- Suriname
- Turks and Caicos Islands
- United States
- Uruguay
- Venezuela
