= 2012 World Junior Championships in Athletics – Women's 400 metres hurdles =

The women's 400 metres hurdles at the 2012 World Junior Championships in Athletics was held at the Estadi Olímpic Lluís Companys on 12, 13, and 14 July.

== Medalists ==
Gold	Silver	Bronze
Janieve Russell; Jamaica	Aurèlie Chaboudez; France	Kaila Barber; United States

== Records ==
Prior to the competition, the existing world junior and championship records were as follows.

World Junior Record	Wang Xing (CHN)	54.40	Nanjing, China	21 October 2005
Championship Record	Lashinda Demus (USA)	54.70	Kingston, Jamaica	19 July 2002
World Junior Leading	Janieve Russell (JAM)	57.04	Kingston, Jamaica	28 June 2012
Broken records during the 2012 World Junior Championships in Athletics
World Junior Leading	Janieve Russell (JAM)	56.62	Barcelona, Spain	14 July 2012

== Results ==
=== Heats ===
Qualification: first 4 of each heat (Q) plus the 4 fastest times (q) qualified

Rank	Heat	Lane	Name	Nationality	Time	Note
1	1	7	Kübra Sesli	Turkey	58.01	Q
2	2	8	Olena Kolesnychenko	Ukraine	58.40	Q
3	1	2	Vilde J. Svortevik	Norway	58.46	Q, PB
4	4	3	Janieve Russell	Jamaica	58.57	Q
5	2	4	Sage Watson	Canada	58.99	Q, PB
5	1	8	Christine Salterberg	Germany	58.99	Q
7	1	9	Eva Trošt	Slovenia	59.15	Q, PB
8	1	4	Valentine Huze	France	59.20	q, PB
9	3	8	Anastasiia Lebid	Ukraine	59.28	Q
10	4	4	Agnieszka Karczmarczyk	Poland	59.31	Q
11	5	8	Taylor Farquhar	Canada	59.38	Q
12	5	9	Aurèlie Chaboudez	France	59.56	Q
13	4	9	Tessa Consedine	Australia	59.66	Q
14	4	8	Anna Ustinova	Russia	59.74	Q
15	2	9	Kernesha Spann	Trinidad and Tobago	59.84	Q
16	1	6	Oona Hujanen	Finland	1:00.01	q, PB
17	2	7	Kaila Barber	United States	1:00.02	Q
18	3	5	Sara Klein	Australia	1:00.06	Q
19	5	3	Tasabih Mohamed El Sayed	Sudan	1:00.13	Q
20	5	5	Shamier Little	United States	1:00.14	Q
21	2	6	Effrosíni Theodórou	Greece	1:00.19	q
22	4	7	Emel Sanli	Turkey	1:00.56	q
23	5	6	Marina Zaiko	Kazakhstan	1:00.63	
24	3	7	Devinn Cartwright	Bahamas	1:00.72	Q
25	3	3	Olga Vovk	Russia	1:00.73	Q
26	3	9	Izelle Neuhoff	South Africa	1:00.83	
27	1	5	Ane Fourie	South Africa	1:00.93	
28	5	7	Minjia Cai	China	1:01.06	
29	4	6	Pedrya Seymour	Bahamas	1:01.09	
30	4	5	R. Anu	India	1:01.14	
31	2	3	Nóra Zajovics	Hungary	1:01.28	
32	2	5	Thi Huyen Nguyen	Vietnam	1:02.01	SB
33	5	4	Irina Asanova	Uzbekistan	1:02.04	
34	1	3	Fanni Dániel	Hungary	1:03.88	
35	3	6	Abir Barkaoui	Tunisia	1:04.42	
36	2	2	Alba Casanovas	Spain	1:10.26	
	3	4	Adekoya Kemi	Nigeria	DNS	

=== Semi-final ===
Qualification: The first 2 of each heat (Q) and the 2 fastest times (q) qualified

Rank	Heat	Lane	Name	Nationality	Time	Note
1	3	4	Janieve Russell	Jamaica	57.23	Q
2	2	8	Kaila Barber	United States	57.29	Q, PB
3	2	7	Vilde J. Svortevik	Norway	57.34	Q, NJ
4	1	5	Olena Kolesnychenko	Ukraine	57.35	Q, PB
5	2	6	Kübra Sesli	Turkey	57.45	q, NJ
6	3	5	Aurèlie Chaboudez	France	57.46	Q, SB
6	1	3	Shamier Little	United States	57.46	Q
8	1	4	Taylor Farquhar	Canada	57.82	q, PB
9	1	6	Christine Salterberg	Germany	57.96	
10	2	5	Sage Watson	Canada	58.04	PB
11	3	7	Anastasiia Lebid	Ukraine	58.13	PB
12	3	8	Eva Trošt	Slovenia	58.60	PB
13	3	3	Emel Sanli	Turkey	58.82	
14	3	6	Sara Klein	Australia	58.93	
15	1	2	Valentine Huze	France	59.42	
16	2	4	Tessa Consedine	Australia	59.75	
17	3	2	Oona Hujanen	Finland	59.88	PB
18	1	7	Agnieszka Karczmarczyk	Poland	59.94	
19	1	9	Tasabih Mohamed El Sayed	Sudan	59.95	
20	1	8	Anna Ustinova	Russia	1:00.40	
21	2	9	Kernesha Spann	Trinidad and Tobago	1:00.63	
22	2	3	Effrosíni Theodórou	Greece	1:00.91	
23	2	2	Olga Vovk	Russia	1:00.97	
24	3	9	Devinn Cartwright	Bahamas	1:03.88	

=== Final ===
Rank	Lane	Name	Nationality	Time	Note
1st place, gold medalist(s)	6	Janieve Russell	Jamaica	56.62	WJL
2nd place, silver medalist(s)	9	Aurèlie Chaboudez	France	57.14	NJ
3rd place, bronze medalist(s)	4	Kaila Barber	United States	57.63	
4	7	Olena Kolesnychenko	Ukraine	58.10	
5	2	Kübra Sesli	Turkey	58.35	
6	5	Vilde J. Svortevik	Norway	58.45	
7	3	Taylor Farquhar	Canada	58.77	
	8	Shamier Little	United States	DNF	

== Participation ==
According to an unofficial count, 36 athletes from 26 countries participated in the event.

- Australia (2)
- Bahamas (2)
- Canada (2)
- China (1)
- Finland (1)
- France (2)
- Germany (1)
- Greece (1)
- Hungary (2)
- India (1)
- Jamaica (1)
- Kazakhstan (1)
- Norway (1)
- Poland (1)
- Russia (2)
- Slovenia (1)
- South Africa (2)
- Spain (1)
- Sudan (1)
- Trinidad and Tobago (1)
- Tunisia (1)
- Turkey (2)
- Ukraine (2)
- United States (2)
- Uzbekistan (1)
- Vietnam (1)
