= Tia-Adana Belle =

Barbadian hurdler (born 1996)

Personal information
- Born: 15 June 1996 (age 30) Ellerton, Barbados
- Education: St. Augustine's University
- Height: 1.78 m (5 ft 10 in)
- Weight: 59 kg (130 lb)

Sport
- Sport: Athletics
- Event: 400 metres hurdles
- University team: St. Augustine's Falcons
- Coached by: George Williams
Medal record
Women's athletics
Representing Barbados
NACAC Championships
Gold medal – first place	2025 Freeport	400 m hurdles
Bronze medal – third place	2025 Freeport	4x400m Mixed

Tia-Adana Djena Belle (born 15 June 1996) is a Barbadian athlete competing in the 400 metres hurdles. She represented her country at the 2016 Summer Olympics without advancing from the first round.

In addition, she won the silver medal at the 2013 World Youth Championships.

She competed at the 2020 Summer Olympics.

== Personal best ==
Event	Result	Venue	Date
Outdoor
400 m hurdles	54.18	(United States) Gainesville	28 March 2019

== International competitions ==
Year	Competition	Venue	Position	Event	Notes
Representing Barbados
2011	CARIFTA Games (U17)	Montego Bay, Jamaica	7th	400 m	58.02
2011	CARIFTA Games (U17)	Montego Bay, Jamaica	2nd	4 × 400 m relay	3:44.61
2012	CARIFTA Games (U17)	Hamilton, Bermuda	4th	400 m	59.93
2012	CARIFTA Games (U17)	Hamilton, Bermuda	3rd	4 × 400 m relay	3:56.87
2012	Central American and Caribbean; Junior Championships (U18)	San Salvador, El Salvador	2nd	400 m	55.92
2012	Central American and Caribbean; Junior Championships (U18)	San Salvador, El Salvador	2nd	400 m hurdles	60.68
2013	CARIFTA Games (U20)	Nassau, Bahamas	3rd	400 m hurdles	61.36
2013	CARIFTA Games (U20)	Nassau, Bahamas	2nd	4 × 400 m relay	3:41.89
2013	World Youth Championships	Donetsk, Ukraine	2nd	400 m hurdles	58.42
2014	Central American and Caribbean; Junior Championships (U20)	Morelia, Mexico	1st	400 m hurdles	60.30
2014	World Junior Championships	Eugene, United States	9th (h)	400 m hurdles	58.59
2015	Pan American Junior Championships	Edmonton, Canada	3rd	400 m hurdles	60.03
2015	Pan American Games	Toronto, Canada	7th (h)	4 × 400 m relay	3:31.72^{1}
2015	NACAC Championships	San José, Costa Rica	13th (h)	400 m hurdles	61.05
2016	NACAC U23 Championships	San Salvador, El Salvador	3rd	400 m hurdles	57.16
2016	Olympic Games	Rio de Janeiro, Brazil	27th (h)	400 m hurdles	56.68
2017	World Championships	London, United Kingdom	37th (h)	400 m hurdles	58.82
2018	Commonwealth Games	Gold Coast, Australia	12th (h)	400 m hurdles	56.55
2018	Central American and Caribbean Games	Barranquilla, Colombia	12th (h)	400 m hurdles	58.42
2018	NACAC Championships	Toronto, Canada	8th	400 m hurdles	58.82
2019	Pan American Games	Lima, Peru	5th	400 m hurdles	55.93
2019	World Championships	Doha, Qatar	35th (h)	400 m hurdles	58.44
2021	Olympic Games	Tokyo, Japan	22nd (sf)	400 m hurdles	59.26
2023	Central American and Caribbean Games	San Salvador, El Salvador	4th	400 m hurdles	56.82
2025	NACAC Championships	Freeport, Bahamas	1st	400 m hurdles	54.67
2025	World Championships	Tokyo, Japan	23rd (sf)	400 m hurdles	55.83

^{1}Disqualified in the final
