= Django Lovett =

Canadian high jumper

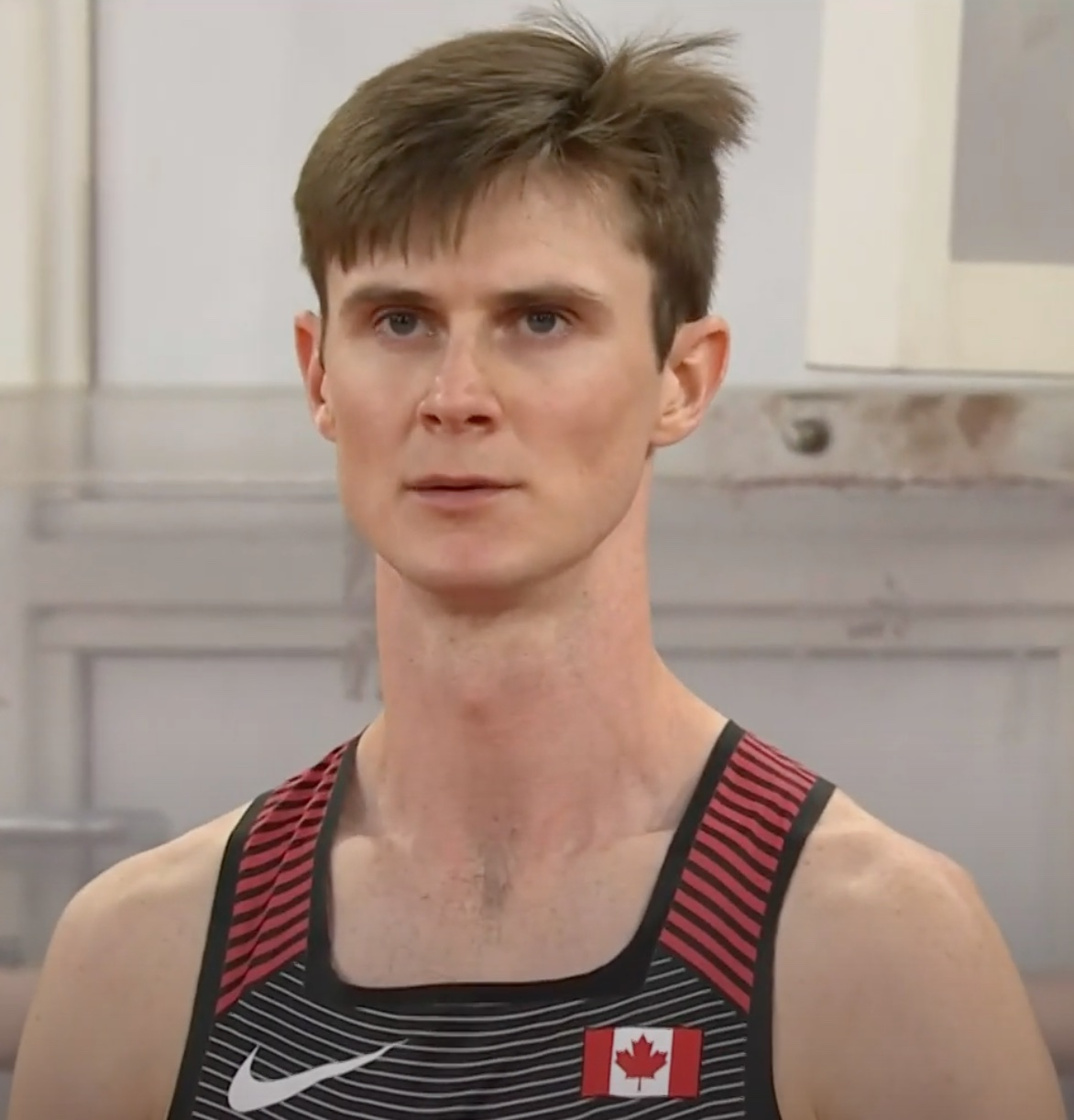

Personal information
- Nationality: Canadian
- Born: 6 July 1992 (age 34) Surrey, British Columbia
- Height: 1.92 m (6 ft 4 in)
- Weight: 72 kg (159 lb)

Sport
- Country: Canada
- Sport: Athletics
- Event: High jump
- College team: University of New Mexico

Achievements and titles
- Personal best: High jump: 2.33 m (2021)
Medal record
Representing Canada
Men's athletics
Commonwealth Games
Bronze medal – third place	2018 Gold Coast	High jump
North American, Central American and Caribbean Championships
Gold medal – first place	2022 Freeport	High jump
Bronze medal – third place	2018 Toronto	High jump

Django Lovett (born 6 July 1992) is a Canadian male track and field athlete who competes in the high jump. He was the bronze medallist at the 2018 Commonwealth Games, setting a personal best of 2.30 m (7 ft 6 1/2 in). Lovett represented Canada at the 2020 Summer Olympics in Tokyo.

== Life and career ==
Born in Surrey, British Columbia to Catherine and John Lovett, he initially played soccer before moving into the high jump, following comments by his school soccer coach that he was too slow for the sport. Lovett had success at a young age in high jump, breaking the Canadian youth record and receiving the honour of Canadian Youth Athlete of the Year in 2009. He attended Brookswood Secondary School before heading south of the border to study Arts and communications at the University of New Mexico.

He made his international debut at the 2009 World Youth Championships in Athletics, taking a bronze medal. He later competed in qualifying at the 2010 World Junior Championships in Athletics and was fifth at the 2012 NACAC Under-23 Championships in Athletics.

He competed athletically for the New Mexico Lobos team and qualified for the NCAA Championships on several occasions. He represented Canada at the 2013 Summer Universiade, though he did not progress beyond the qualifying round. He was top of the podium at the Canada Summer Games that year.

Lovett's progress plateaued after the age of seventeen: from a best of 2.17 m (7 ft 1 1/4 in) in 2009, he had added only six centimetres to that by 2015. Clearances of 2.27 m (7 ft 5 1/4 in) in the 2017 outdoor season then 2.29 m (7 ft 6 in) in the 2018 indoor season saw him edge towards the elite level of the sport.

In the leadup to the 2020 Summer Olympics in Tokyo, Lovett hit the Olympic qualifying standard in his third and final attempt at 2.33 metres at the Canadian Olympic track and field trials, beating Michael Mason for the Canadian title in the process. He was thus named to the Canadian Olympic team. Competing at the Olympic high jump event, he jumped 2.30 metres to finish in eighth place.

== International competitions ==
Year	Competition	Venue	Position	Event	Notes
2009	World Youth Championships	Brixen, Italy	3rd	High jump	2.17 m
2010	World Junior Championships	Moncton, Canada	24th (q)	High jump	2.10 m
2012	NACAC U23 Championships	Irapuato, Mexico	5th	High jump	2.10 m
2013	Universiade	Kazan, Russia	15th (q)	High jump	2.15 m
2018	Commonwealth Games	Gold Coast, Australia	3rd	High jump	2.30 m
2018	NACAC Championships	Toronto, Canada	3rd	High jump	2.28 m
2019	World Championships	Doha, Qatar	23rd (q)	High jump	2.22 m
2021	Olympic Games	Tokyo, Japan	8th	High jump	2.30 m
2022	World Championships	Eugene, United States	6th	High jump	2.27 m
2022	NACAC Championships	Freeport, Bahamas	=1st	High jump	2.25 m
2023	World Championships	Budapest, Hungary	27th (q)	High jump	2.22 m

== National titles ==
- Canada Summer Games
  - High jump: 2013 (runner-up in 2009)
