= Mount Vernon Presbyterian School =

Private school in Sandy Springs, Georgia, United States

Mount Vernon School
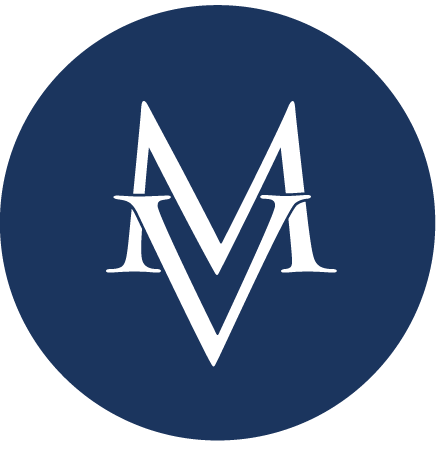

Location
- 471 / 510 Mount Vernon Hwy. Sandy Springs, Georgia 30328-4141; United States; 33°55′29″N 84°22′15″W

Information
- School type: Private
- Established: 1972
- CEEB code: 110189
- Head of school: Kristy Lundstrom
- Teaching staff: 130 (on an FTE basis)
- Grades: PK-12
- Gender: Coeducational
- Enrollment: 1,289 (2023–24)
- Student to teacher ratio: 9
- Campus size: 37 acres (150,000 m^{2})
- Campus type: Suburban
- Colors: Blue and white
- Athletics: 43 sports teams
- Athletics conference: Georgia High School Association
- Mascot: Renegade the Mustang
- Religious Affiliation: Christian (non-denominational)
- Website: mountvernonschool.org

Mount Vernon School (MV) is a private, independent, coeducational day school in Sandy Springs, Georgia, United States, with an Atlanta postal address.

== History ==
The school opened in 1972, and was formerly known as Mount Vernon Presbyterian School (MVPS).

== Campus ==
Mount Vernon School has a 37-acre campus.

== School divisions ==
The school has a pre-school. It also offers Advanced Placement (AP) courses.

== Notable alumni ==
- James Banks III, basketball player in the Israeli Basketball Premier League
- Nnenya Hailey, professional hurdler, model, and personal trainer
- Amin Stevens, professional basketball player for Ironi Kiryat Ata in the Israeli Basketball Premier League
- Will Buie Jr., actor
- Jacob Moran, actor
- Sophia Van Name, volleyball player
