= James Banks III =

American basketball player (born 1998)

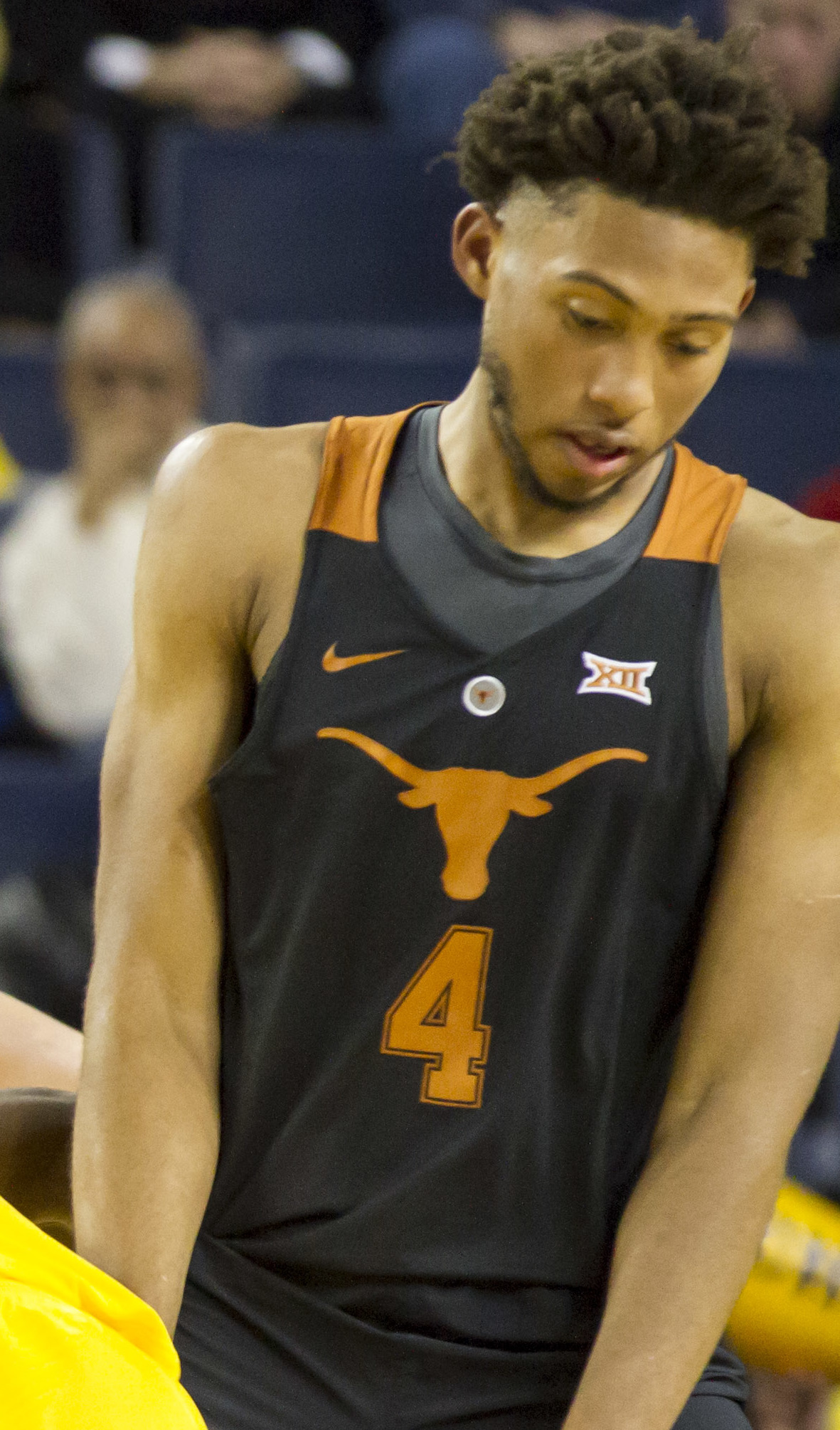
- Banks with Texas in 2016

No. 1 – Bosna
- Position: Center
- League: ABA League; EuroCup

Personal information
- Born: January 16, 1998 (age 28) Decatur, Georgia, U.S.
- Listed height: 6 ft 10 in (2.08 m)
- Listed weight: 250 lb (113 kg)

Career information
- High school: Columbia (DeKalb County, Georgia); St. Francis (Alpharetta, Georgia); Mount Vernon Presbyterian (Atlanta, Georgia); La Lumiere (La Porte, Indiana)
- College: Texas (2016–2018); Georgia Tech (2018–2020)
- NBA draft: 2020: undrafted
- Playing career: 2020–present

Career history
- 2020–2021: Hapoel Be'er Sheva
- 2021–2022: Birmingham Squadron
- 2022–2023: Texas Legends
- 2023–2024: Maine Celtics
- 2024–2025: Aris Thessaloniki
- 2025: Maine Celtics
- 2025–2026: Austin Spurs
- 2026–present: Bosna

Career highlights
- 2× ACC All-Defensive Team (2019, 2020)
- Stats at NBA.com
- Stats at Basketball Reference
Medals
Men's basketball
Representing the United States
FIBA Americas U18 Championship
Gold medal – first place	2016 Chile	Team

James Alton Banks III (born January 16, 1998) is an American professional basketball player for Bosna of the ABA League and the EuroCup. He played college basketball for the Texas Longhorns and Georgia Tech Yellow Jackets. In 2020–21 he led the Israel Basketball Premier League in blocked shots per game.

== High school career ==
Banks grew up playing football until eighth grade. He did not play competitive basketball until his freshman year of high school. He initially attended Columbia High School in DeKalb County, Georgia and St. Francis High School in Alpharetta, Georgia. He averaged 23 points and 14 rebounds per game as a junior at Mount Vernon Presbyterian School in Atlanta. After being ruled ineligible by the Georgia High School Association for using an incorrect address, he transferred to La Lumiere School in La Porte, Indiana for his senior year. Banks led La Lumiere to its first ever appearance at the High School Nationals title game. A consensus four-star recruit, he committed to play college basketball for the University of Texas at Austin on October 8, 2015.

== College career ==
Banks played sparingly in his two years playing for the Texas Longhorns, averaging under two points per game.

After his sophomore season, he transferred to Georgia Tech and received a waiver for immediate eligibility. On January 19, 2019, Banks recorded a career-high 24 points and 11 rebounds in a 79–51 loss to Louisville. As a junior, he averaged 10.5 points, 7.8 rebounds and 2.5 blocks per game. Banks ranked 10th nationally in blocks and led the Atlantic Coast Conference (ACC) in that category during conference play. He was named to the ACC All-Defensive Team. On November 5, 2019, he tallied 20 points, 14 rebounds and five blocks, making the game-winning free throws, in an 82–81 overtime victory over NC State. On December 1, Banks posted 12 points, 10 rebounds and a career-high eight blocks in a 68–65 win over Bethune–Cookman. As a senior, he averaged 9.5 points, 7.6 rebounds and 2.5 blocks per game. Banks ranked second in the ACC in blocks and earned ACC All-Defensive Team honors for his second time. He finished with the eighth-most career blocks (154) in program history.

== Professional career ==
On August 1, 2020, Banks signed his first professional contract, a one-year deal with Hapoel Be'er Sheva of the Israeli Premier League. He said: "It was just a great overall situation for me, with the need on that team for a big like me, the opportunity to play in the Winner League, which is one of the biggest leagues over there in Europe ... There’s a lot of spiritual and holy things (to visit)... There’s a lot of history over there." In 2020–21 he led the Israel Basketball Premier League in blocked shots per game (1.8).

In August 2021, Banks joined the Cleveland Cavaliers for the 2021 NBA Summer League and on October 9, 2021, he signed with the New Orleans Pelicans. However, he was waived prior to the start of the season. On October 25, he signed with the Birmingham Squadron as an affiliate player.

On February 9, 2022, the Texas Legends traded for Banks, following season-ending injuries to both their centers, Tyler Davis and Loudon Love.

On October 20, 2023, Banks signed with the Boston Celtics, but was waived the same day. Eight days later, he joined the Maine Celtics.

On August 28, 2024, Banks signed with Greek club Aris.

On January 23, 2025, Banks returned to the Maine Celtics.

For the 2025–26 season, Banks was added to the roster of the San Antonio Spurs' NBA G League affiliate, the Austin Spurs.

== National team career ==
Banks won a gold medal with the United States under-18 national team at the 2016 FIBA Americas Under-18 Championship in Valdivia, Chile. He averaged 2.3 points, 4.5 rebounds and 1.8 blocks per game.

== Personal life ==
When Banks was four years old, his father James Banks Jr. died in a motorcycle accident. In February 2015, his mother, Sonja, was paralyzed in a car accident. She worked as a paralegal before joining the ministry. He has an older sister named Marissa.
