= Brandon McBride =

Canadian track and field athlete

Brandon McBride OLY
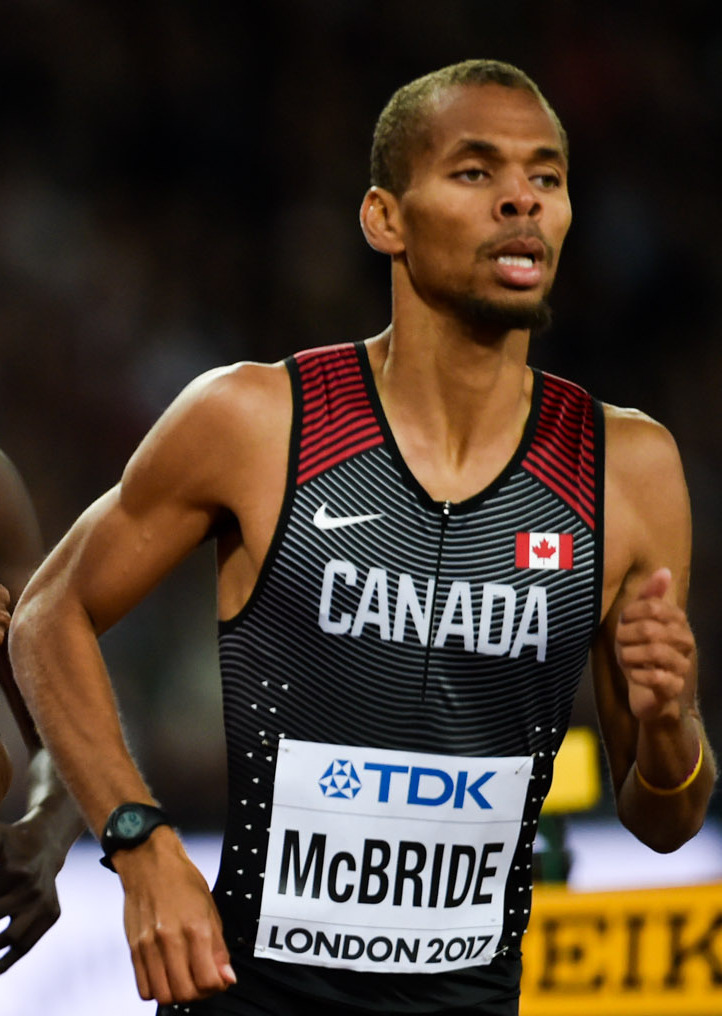
- McBride at the 2017 IAAF World Championships

Personal information
- Born: June 15, 1994 (age 32) Windsor, Ontario, Canada
- Employer: Adidas
- Height: 1.93 m (6 ft 4 in)
- Weight: 74 kg (163 lb)

Sport
- Country: Canada
- Sport: Athletics
- Events: 800 metres, 1500 metres
- College team: Mississippi State Bulldogs
- Turned pro: 2016

Achievements and titles
- Personal best: 800 m: 1:43.20 (Monaco 2018)
Medal record
Men's athletics
Representing Canada
NACAC Championships
Gold medal – first place	2018 Toronto	800 m

Brandon McBride (born June 15, 1994) is a Canadian track and field athlete competing in middle-distance events, predominantly in the 800 metres. He won the gold medal in the event at the 2018 NACAC Championships.

McBride represented Canada at the 2016 Rio and 2020 Tokyo Olympics. He is the former Canadian record holder for the 800 m and won four national titles.

== Biography ==
McBride attended W. F. Herman Secondary School in Windsor, Ontario.

He was a two-time NCAA Division I 800 metres champion and nine-time track and field All-American at Mississippi State University.

In July 2016, McBride was officially named to Canada's Olympic team for the Olympics Games in Rio de Janeiro, where he reached the 800 m semi-finals.

He finished eighth in his specialist event at the 2017 World Championships in Athletics held in London.

In July 2018, McBride broke the Canadian national record in the 800 m at the Monaco Diamond League with a time of 1:43.20.

== Competition record ==
Representing Canada
Year	Competition	Venue	Position	Event	Time
2011	World Youth Championships	Villeneuve-d'Ascq, France	13th	800 m	1:51.00
2012	World Junior Championships	Barcelona, Spain	6th	800 m	1:46.07
2013	Canada Games	Sherbrooke, Canada	1st	400 m	46.18
2013	Canada Games	Sherbrooke, Canada	1st	800 m	1:46.38
2013	Canada Games	Sherbrooke, Canada	1st	4 × 400 m relay	3:07.45
2013	Pan American Junior Championships	Medellín, Colombia	1st	400 m	45.89
2013	Pan American Junior Championships	Medellín, Colombia	3rd	4 × 400 m relay	3:07.61
2014	Commonwealth Games	Glasgow, United Kingdom	11th (h)	800 m	1:49.29^{1}
2015	Pan American Games	Toronto, Canada	9th (h)	800 m	1:49.65
2015	Pan American Games	Toronto, Canada	9th (h)	4 × 400 m relay	3:05.40
2016	Olympic Games	Rio de Janeiro, Brazil	14th (sf)	800 m	1:45.41
2017	World Championships	London, United Kingdom	8th	800 m	1:47.09
2018	NACAC Championships	Toronto, Canada	1st	800 m	1:46.14
2019	World Championships	Doha, Qatar	18th (sf)	800 m	1:46.21
2021	Olympic Games	Tokyo, Japan	29th (h)	800 m	1:46.32
2022	World Championships	Eugene, United States	41st (h)	800 m	1:57.43

^{1}Disqualified in the semifinal
