= Jessica Gelibert =

Haitian hurdler (born 1994)

Personal information
- Born: 8 November 1994 (age 31) Bay Shore, New York, United States

Sport
- Sport: Track and field
Medal record
Representing Haiti
Pan American Junior Championships
Bronze medal – third place	2013 Medellin	400m hurdles

Jessica Gelibert (born 8 November 1994) is a Haitian hurdler who specializes in the 400 metres hurdles.

She won the bronze medal at the 2013 Pan American Junior Championships, finished eighth at the 2015 Pan American Games and competed at the 2018 Central American and Caribbean Games without reaching the final.

Her personal best time is 56.87 seconds, achieved in May 2014 in Jacksonville. She holds the Haitian record.
