= Nnenya Hailey =

American hurdler (born 1994)

Personal information
- Nationality: USA
- Born: Cara Nnenya Hailey; 23 February 1994 (32 years, 160 days old)
- Home town: Atlanta, Georgia
- Education: Mount Vernon Presbyterian School; Clemson University; University of Arizona
- Height: 165 cm (5 ft 5 in)
- Weight: 54 kg (119 lb)

Sport
- Sport: Athletics
- Events: 400 metres hurdles 100 metres hurdles
- College team: Clemson Tigers; Arizona Wildcats

Achievements and titles
- National finals: 2015 NCAA Indoors; • 60m hurdles, 7th; 2015 NCAAs; • 400m hurdles, 6th; 2018 Canadian Indoors; • 60m hurdles, 1st (gold); 2021 USA Champs; • 400m hurdles, DQ
- Personal bests: 400mH: 54.21 (2021); 100mH: 12.96 (+1.3) (2016)
Medal record
Women's athletics
Representing United States
World U18 Championships
Gold medal – first place	2011 Lille Métropole	400 m hurdles
- Updated on December 28, 2023

Cara Nnenya Hailey (CAH-ruh KNEEN-yuh HAY-lee; born February 23, 1994) is an American hurdler specializing in the 400 metres hurdles. She won the gold medal in the 400 m hurdles at the 2011 World U18 Championships.

== Biography ==
Hailey is from Atlanta, Georgia where she attended Mount Vernon Presbyterian School, winning four Georgia High School Association AAA state championships in the 200 metres and 300 metres hurdles, plus two championships in the 100 metres hurdles.

In 2011, Hailey won the United States World Youth Trials in the 400 metres hurdles, qualifying her for the 2011 World U18 Championships in Athletics. At the championships, Hailey advanced to the finals as the fastest qualifier and built up a significant lead through nine hurdles. Despite hitting the final hurdle, Hailey maintained her lead and won the gold medal in a world U18 leading time of 57.93 – the second-fastest time ever by a U.S. high schooler behind only Leah Nugent.

Hailey spent the 2012–13 season on the Clemson Tigers track and field team, finishing 3rd in the 400 m hurdles at the 2013 Atlantic Coast Conference outdoor championships. For the remainder of her collegiate career, she transferred to the Arizona Wildcats track and field program. At Arizona, she was a standout athlete achieving NCAA championship appearances in 2014, 2015, and 2016, including 7th and 6th-place finishes at the 2015 indoor and outdoor championships respectively.

Hailey aimed to make her first Olympic team at the 2021 United States Olympic trials. She finished second to Sydney McLaughlin in her heat in an Olympic qualifying time of 55.05 seconds, but she left the track with unexpected knee issues as the meet was delayed with 92 °F (33 °C) temperatures. Before her heat started, Hailey had to beg spectators in the stands for water, and four consecutive false starts caused McLaughlin's knees to bleed from kneeling on the hot track for so long.

Hailey advanced for the finals and finished 5th across the line, but she was later disqualified.

== Statistics ==
=== Personal bests ===
Event	Mark	Place	Competition	Venue	Date	Ref
400 metres hurdles	54.21	2nd place, silver medalist(s)	Kamila Skolimowska Memorial	Chorzów, Poland	September 5, 2021	
100 metres hurdles	12.96 (+1.3 m/s)	1st place, gold medalist(s)	Jim Click Shootout	Tucson, Arizona	April 9, 2016	
