= Gabriel Dupuy =

French entomologist (1840–1913)

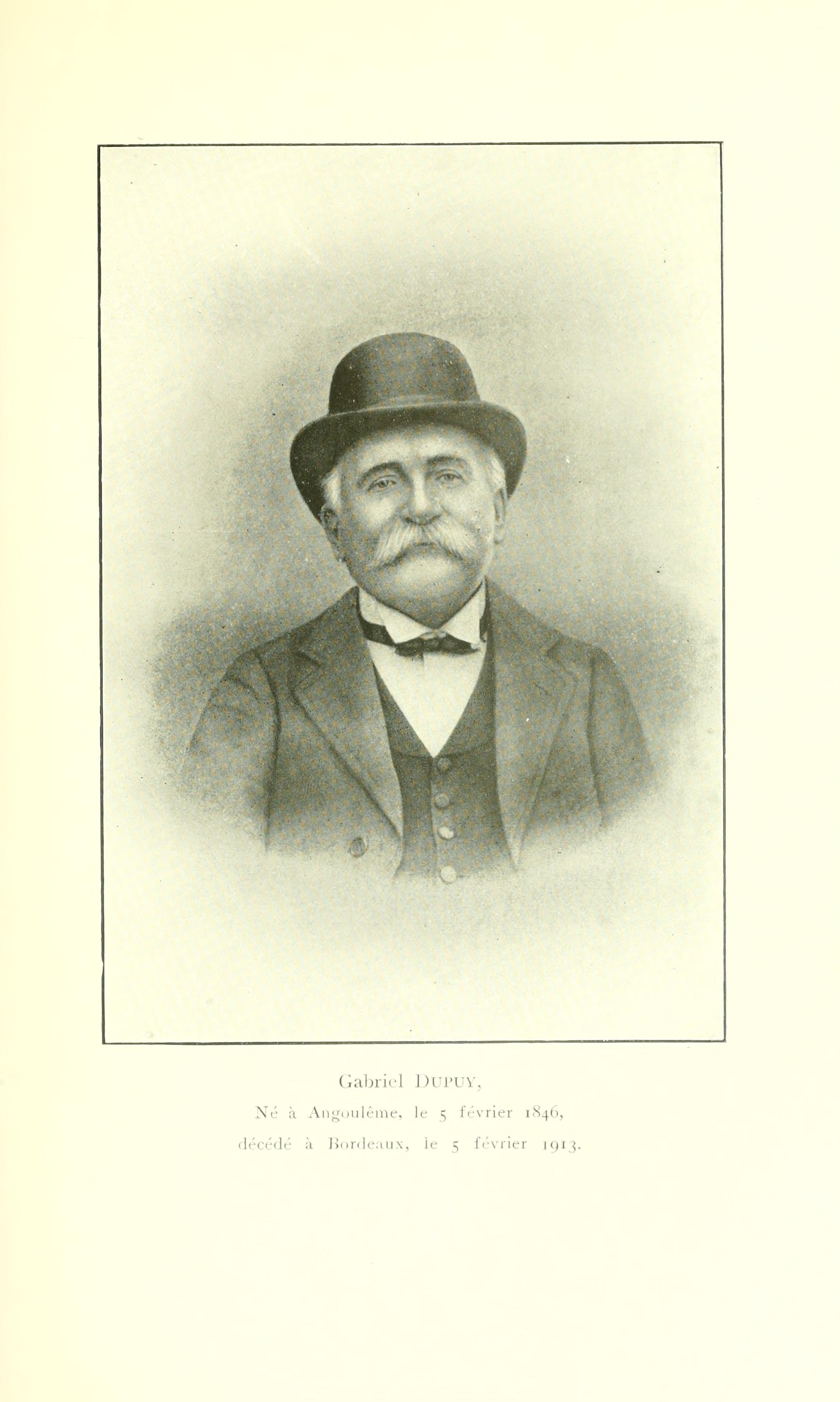
Gabriel Dupuy

Gabriel Dupuy (5 February 1840, Angouleme – 5 February 1913, Bordeaux) was a French entomologist, who specialised in Lepidoptera.

Depuy taught at École nationale d'Agriculture de Montpellier (Hérault). He studied the butterflies and moths of France notably Charente, Deux-Sèvres, Dordogne, and Gironde.

He was a Member of the Société Entomologique de France.
