= Athletics at the 2015 Pan American Games – Women's 400 metres hurdles =

Women's 400 metres hurdles at the 2015 Pan American Games
- Venue: CIBC Pan Am and Parapan Am Athletics Stadium
- Dates: July 21–22
- Competitors: 16 from 12 nations
- Winning time: 55.50

Medalists
Gold medal	Shamier Little	United States
Silver medal	Sarah Wells	Canada
Bronze medal	Déborah Rodríguez	Uruguay

The women's 400 metres hurdles sprint competition of the athletics events at the 2015 Pan American Games will take place between July 21 and July 22 at the CIBC Pan Am and Parapan Am Athletics Stadium in Toronto, Canada. The defending Pan American Games champion is Princesa Oliveros of Colombia.

== Records ==
Prior to this competition, the existing world and Pan American Games records were as follows:

World record	Yuliya Pechonkina (RUS)	52.34	Tula, Russia	August 8, 2003
Pan American Games record	Daimí Pernía (CUB)	53.44	Winnipeg, Canada	July 28, 1999

== Qualification ==
Each National Olympic Committee (NOC) was able to enter up to two entrants providing they had met the minimum standard (59.56) in the qualifying period (January 1, 2014 to June 28, 2015).

== Schedule ==
Date	Time	Round
July 21, 2015	12:05	Semifinals
July 22, 2015	19:15	Final

== Results ==
All times shown are in seconds.

KEY:	q	Fastest non-qualifiers	Q	Qualified	NR	National record	PB	Personal best	SB	Seasonal best	DQ	Disqualified

=== Semifinals ===
Rank	Heat	Name	Nationality	Time	Notes
1	2	Shamier Little	United States	56.08	Q
2	1	Sparkle McKnight	Trinidad and Tobago	56.56	Q, SB
3	2	Sarah Wells	Canada	56.77	Q
4	2	Zurian Hechavarria	Cuba	56.82	Q, SB
5	2	Déborah Rodríguez	Uruguay	56.86	q
6	2	Jessica Gelibert	Haiti	57.58	q, SB
7	1	Zudikey Rodríguez	Mexico	57.64	Q, SB
8	1	Sharolyn Scott	Costa Rica	57.76	Q, SB
9	2	Samantha Elliott	Jamaica	58.30	
10	1	Sage Watson	Canada	58.36	
11	1	Ristananna Tracey	Jamaica	58.62	
12	1	Jailma de Lima	Brazil	58.72	
13	1	Magdalena Mendoza	Venezuela	58.95	
14	2	Josanne Lucas	Trinidad and Tobago	1:00.30	
15	2	Jenea McCammon	Guyana	1:03.21	
	1	Kori Carter	United States	DNS	

=== Final ===
Rank	Lane	Name	Nationality	Time	Notes
1st place, gold medalist(s)	4	Shamier Little	United States	55.50	
2nd place, silver medalist(s)	3	Sarah Wells	Canada	56.17	
3rd place, bronze medalist(s)	2	Déborah Rodríguez	Uruguay	56.41	
4	8	Zurian Hechavarria	Cuba	56.72	SB
5	5	Sparkle McKnight	Trinidad and Tobago	57.30	
6	6	Zudikey Rodríguez	Mexico	57.65	
7	7	Sharolyn Scott	Costa Rica	58.65	
8	1	Jessica Gelibert	Haiti	1:00.23	
