= Jackie Baumann =

German athlete

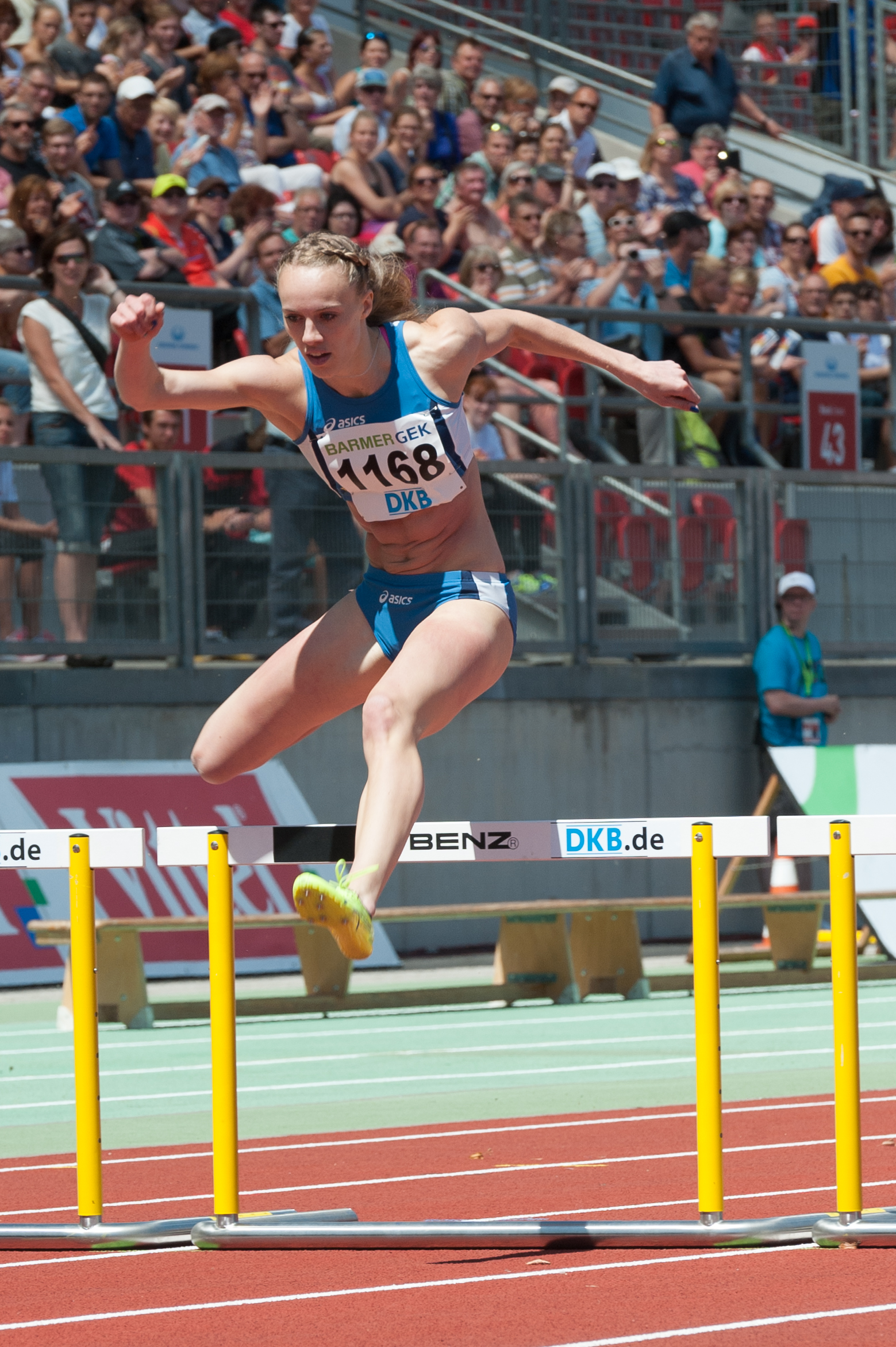

Personal information
- Nationality: German
- Born: 24 August 1995 (age 30) Ulm, Baden-Württemberg, Germany
- Height: 173 cm (5 ft 8 in)
- Weight: 58 kg (128 lb)

Sport
- Country: Germany
- Sport: Track and field
- Event: Hurdling

Jackie Baumann (born 24 August 1995) is a retired German athlete who specialised in hurdling. She qualified for 2016 Summer Olympics where she finished 6th in her heat of the 400 m hurdles and did not qualify for the semifinals. She is a two-time German champion in the 400 m event. Her father, Dieter Baumann, was the Olympic champion in the 5000 m event at the 1992 Summer Olympics.

== Personal bests ==
=== Outdoor ===
Event	Record	Venue	Date
400 metres hurdles	56.19	Oordegem-Lede	28 May 2016
