= Shamier Little =

American hurdler (born 1995)

Shamier Khalia Little
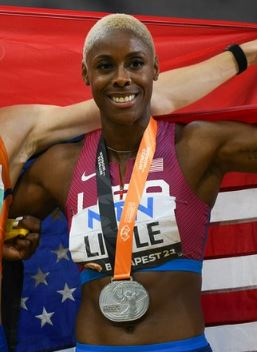
- Little in Budapest in 2023

Personal information
- Born: March 20, 1995 (age 31) Louisville, Kentucky, U.S.
- Home town: Chicago, Illinois, U.S.
- Employer: Adidas
- Height: 5 ft 7 in (170 cm)

Sport
- Country: United States
- Sport: Athletics
- Event: Hurdles
- College team: Texas A&M
- Turned pro: 2016

Achievements and titles
- Personal bests: 400 m: 49.68 (Monaco 2023); 400 m hurdles: 52.39 (Stockholm 2021)
Medal record
Women's athletics
Representing the United States
Olympic Games
Gold medal – first place	2024 Paris	4 × 400 m relay
Silver medal – second place	2024 Paris	4 × 400 m mixed
World Championships
Silver medal – second place	2015 Beijing	400 m hurdles
Silver medal – second place	2023 Budapest	400 m hurdles
World Indoor Championships
Gold medal – first place	2026 Toruń	4 × 400 m relay
Pan American Games
Gold medal – first place	2015 Toronto	400 m hurdles
Gold medal – first place	2015 Toronto	4 × 400 m relay
World Junior Championships
Gold medal – first place	2014 Eugene	400 m hurdles
Gold medal – first place	2014 Eugene	4 × 400 m relay
Continental Cup
Silver medal – second place	2018 Ostrava	400 m hurdles

Shamier Little (/ʃəˈmɪər/ shə-MEER; born March 20, 1995) is an American track and field sprinter specializing in the 400 metres hurdles. As a 20-year-old college sophomore at Texas A&M University, Little was the 2015 US champion. She then went on to win the silver medal in her signature event at the 2015 and 2023 World Championships. In July 2021, she became the fifth fastest woman of all time at the event.

== Early life ==
Born in Louisville, Kentucky, Little is the child of athletic parents, her father a football cornerback and her mother a star basketball player and high jumper at Eastern Kentucky University. Shamier began participating in youth track and field as an 8 year old. She made her first appearance at the national level at the 2004 USATF Youth Championships as a 100 meter sprinter running for the University of Chicago Youth Track Club. She regularly participated in all comers track meets. Later Little ran for the Country Club Hills Gazelles both in USATF and AAU competitions. None of her early youth competitions could be labeled exceptional.

At Robert Lindblom Math & Science Academy in Chicago, Little got more serious setting the IHSA Class 2A records in 100 meters hurdles, 200 meters and 400 meters. She won the 2011 AAU Junior Olympics at 400 hurdles. In 2012, she won the Arcadia Invitational in the 400 meters, which she repeated in 2013. She won the Junior National Championships in 400 hurdles, which qualified her for the 2012 World Junior Championships in Athletics, but she did not finish the final, falling over the last hurdle while in medal contention. In 2013, Little tried 100 meters hurdles and 400 at the National Championships, finishing off the podium in both.

== Career ==
After high school, Little chose to go to Texas A&M University. As a freshman, she won the NCAA Championships at 400 hurdles and helped her team get second place in the 4 × 400 meters relay. Later that summer, she won the 2014 World Junior Championships in the 400 hurdles.

In 2015, before winning the overall national championship, she repeated as NCAA Champion, running the #1 time worldwide to that point in the season. The National Championship offered Little an invitation to run in the 2015 Pan American Games, where she took the gold medal.

In 2016, Little won a third consecutive NCAA 400 m hurdles champion title.

In October 2024, it was announced that she had signed up for the inaugural season of the Michael Johnson founded Grand Slam Track.

== Achievements ==
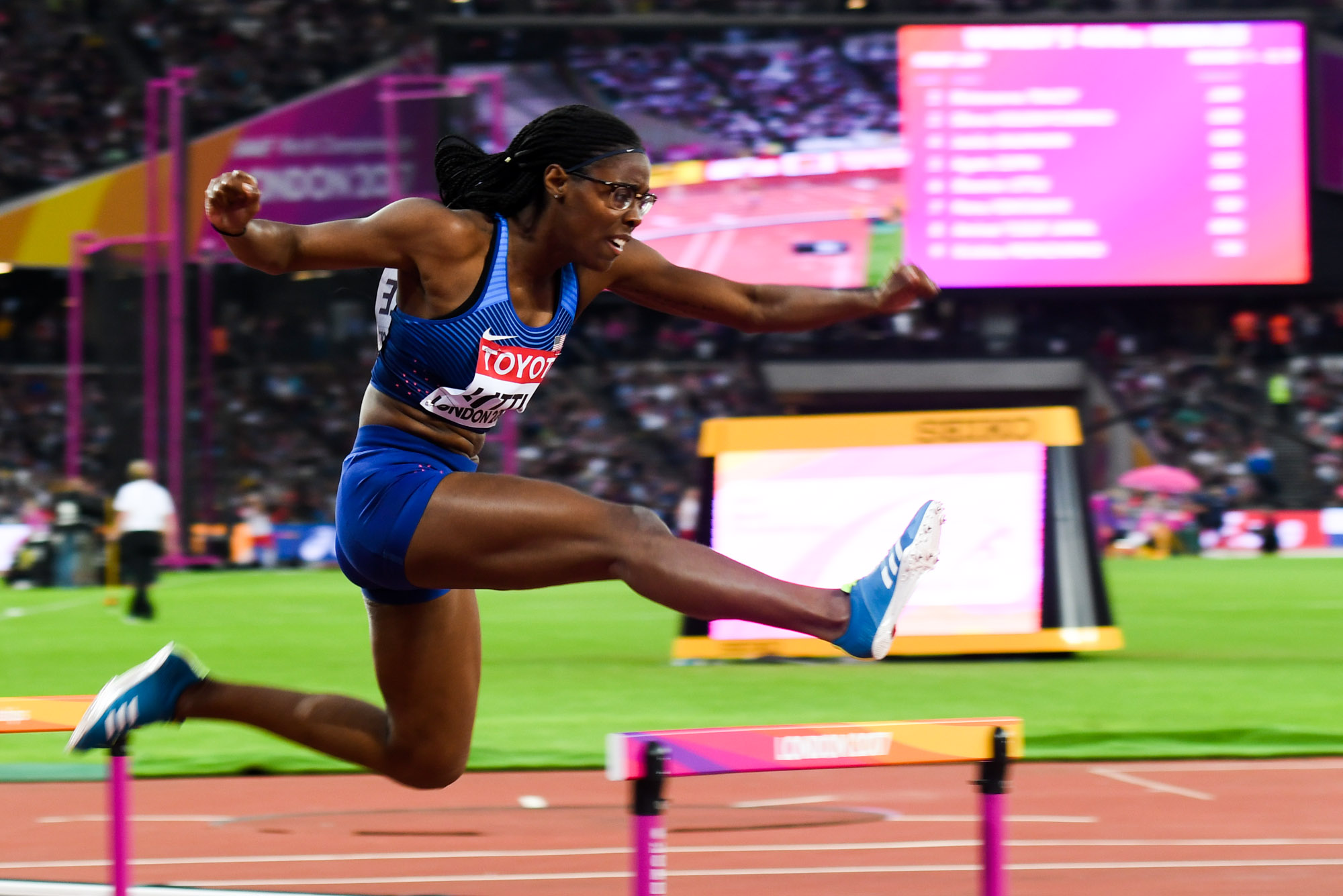
Little hurdles at the 2017 World Championships in Athletics in London.

All information taken from World Athletics profile.

=== Personal bests ===
Event	Time (m:)s	Wind	Venue	Date	Notes
200 meters	23.02	+1.5 m/s	Baton Rouge, LA, United States	29 April 2023	
400 meters	49.68	—N/a	Monaco	21 July 2023	
400 meters indoor	50.57	—N/a	Fayetteville, AR, United States	21 February 2021	
600 meters indoor	1:24.65	—N/a	Fayetteville, AR, United States	13 January 2023	8th woman all time
100 meters hurdles	13.77	+0.4 m/s	Baton Rouge, LA, United States	3 May 2014	
400 meters hurdles	52.39	—N/a	Stockholm, Sweden	4 July 2021	5th woman all time

=== International competitions ===
Representing the United States
Year	Competition	Venue	Position	Event	Time	Notes
2012	World Junior Championships	Barcelona, Spain	6th (sf) DNF	400 m hurdles	DNF	(Note: Little timed 57.46 s in the semi-finals. It would have been third result in the final.)
2014	World Junior Championships	Eugene, OR, United States	1st	400 m hurdles	55.66	
2014	World Junior Championships	Eugene, OR, United States	1st	4 × 400 m relay	3:30.42	WU20L
2015	Pan American Games	Toronto, Canada	1st	400 m hurdles	55.50	
2015	Pan American Games	Toronto, Canada	1st	4 × 400 m relay	3:25.68	
2015	World Championships	Beijing, China	2nd	400 m hurdles	53.94	
2017	World Championships	London, United Kingdom	11th (sf)	400 m hurdles	55.76	
2018	NACAC Championships	Toronto, Canada	1st	400 m hurdles	53.32	CR
2018	Continental Cup	Ostrava, Czech Republic	2nd	400 m hurdles	53.86	
2022	World Championships	Eugene, OR, United States	4th	400 m hurdles	53.76	
2023	World Championships	Budapest, Hungary	2nd	400 m hurdles	52.80	
2024	Olympic Games	Paris, France	1st	4 × 400 m relay	3:15.27 WL AR	
2024	Olympic Games	Paris, France	2nd	4 × 400 m mixed	3:07.74	
2026	World Indoor Championships	Toruń, Poland	1st	4 × 400 m relay	3:25.81	
2026	World Ultimate Championship	Budapest, Hungary	12th (h)	400 m hurdles	54.53	

=== Circuit performances ===
Grand Slam Track results
Slam	Race group	Event	Pl.	Time	Prize money
2025 Miami Slam	Long hurdles	400 m hurdles	8th	57.55	US$20,000
2025 Miami Slam	Long hurdles	400 m	4th	51.84	US$20,000
2025 Philadelphia Slam	Long hurdles	400 m hurdles		DNF	
2025 Philadelphia Slam	Long hurdles	400 m		DNS	

=== Circuit wins ===
- Diamond League meetings

400 metres hurdles wins, other events specified in parentheses

- 2016: Zürich Weltklasse
- 2018: Lausanne Athletissima, London Anniversary Games
- 2019: Lausanne
- 2023: Rabat Meeting International (SB)

=== National and NCAA titles ===
- USA Outdoor Track and Field Championships
  - 400 m hurdles: 2015, 2018, 2023
- NCAA Division I Women's Outdoor Track and Field Championships
  - 400 m hurdles: 2014, 2015, 2016
