= Hayley McLean =

British hurdler

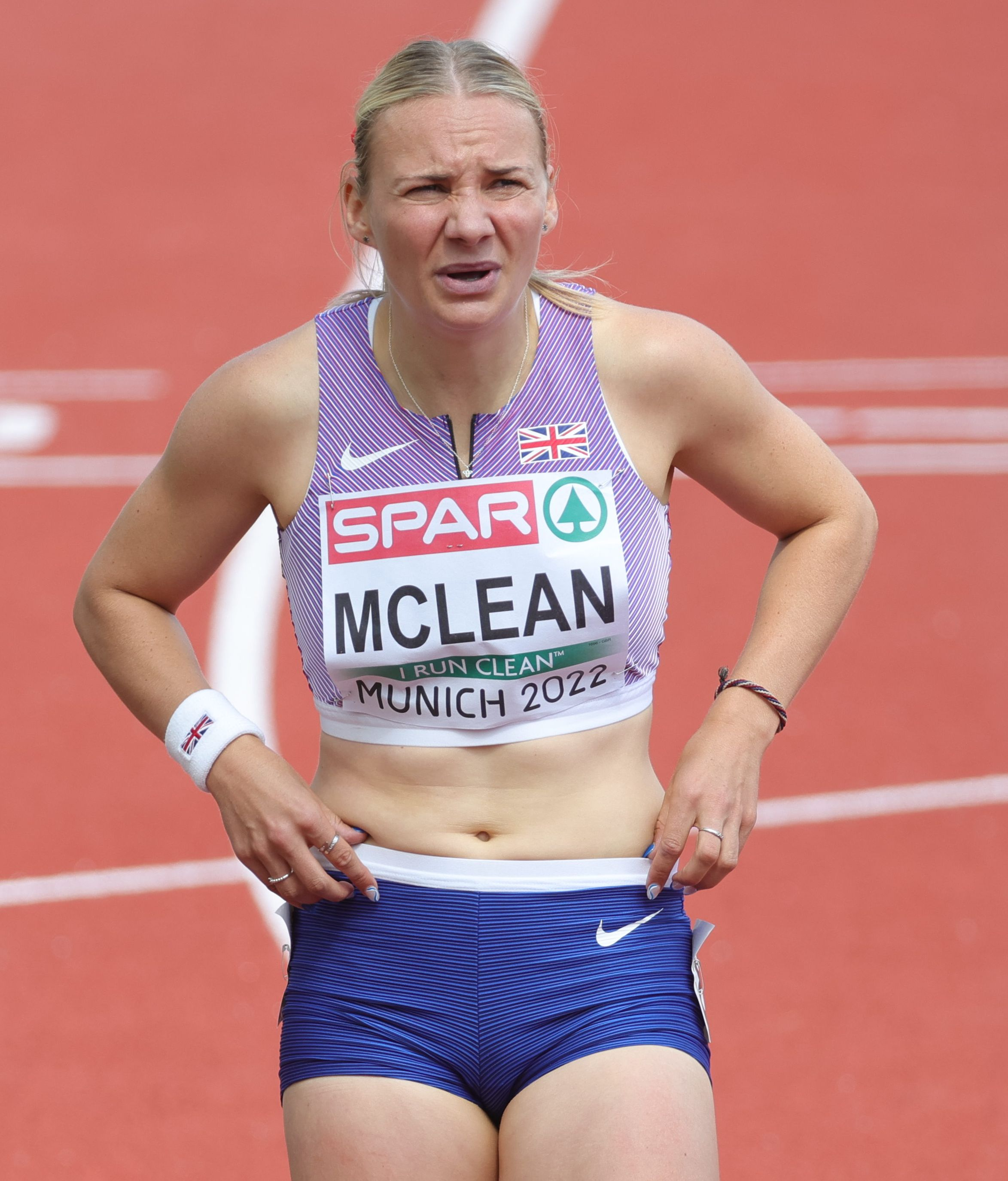
- McLean in Munich 2022

Personal information
- Nationality: British (English)
- Born: 9 September 1994 (age 31) Stanford-le-Hope, England

Sport
- Sport: Track and field
- Event: 400 metre hurdles
- Club: Chelmsford Athletics Club
Medal record
Track and field
Representing Great Britain
European U20 Championships
Gold medal – first place	2013 Rieti	Women's 400m hurdles

Hayley McLean (born 9 September 1994) is a British hurdler who competes in international elite events.

== Biography ==
McLean became the European junior champion after winning the gold medal at the 2013 European Athletics Junior Championships in Rieti, recording a personal best at the time of 57.26 in the 400 metre hurdles.

She represented the England team at the 2014 Commonwealth Games in Glasgow but did not qualify for the final.

In 2014, she finished third behind Eilidh Child at the 2014 British Athletics Championships and has gone on to podium again at the Championships in 2015, 2020, 2022 and 2025.
