= Sage Watson =

Canadian athlete (born 1994)

Sage Walker
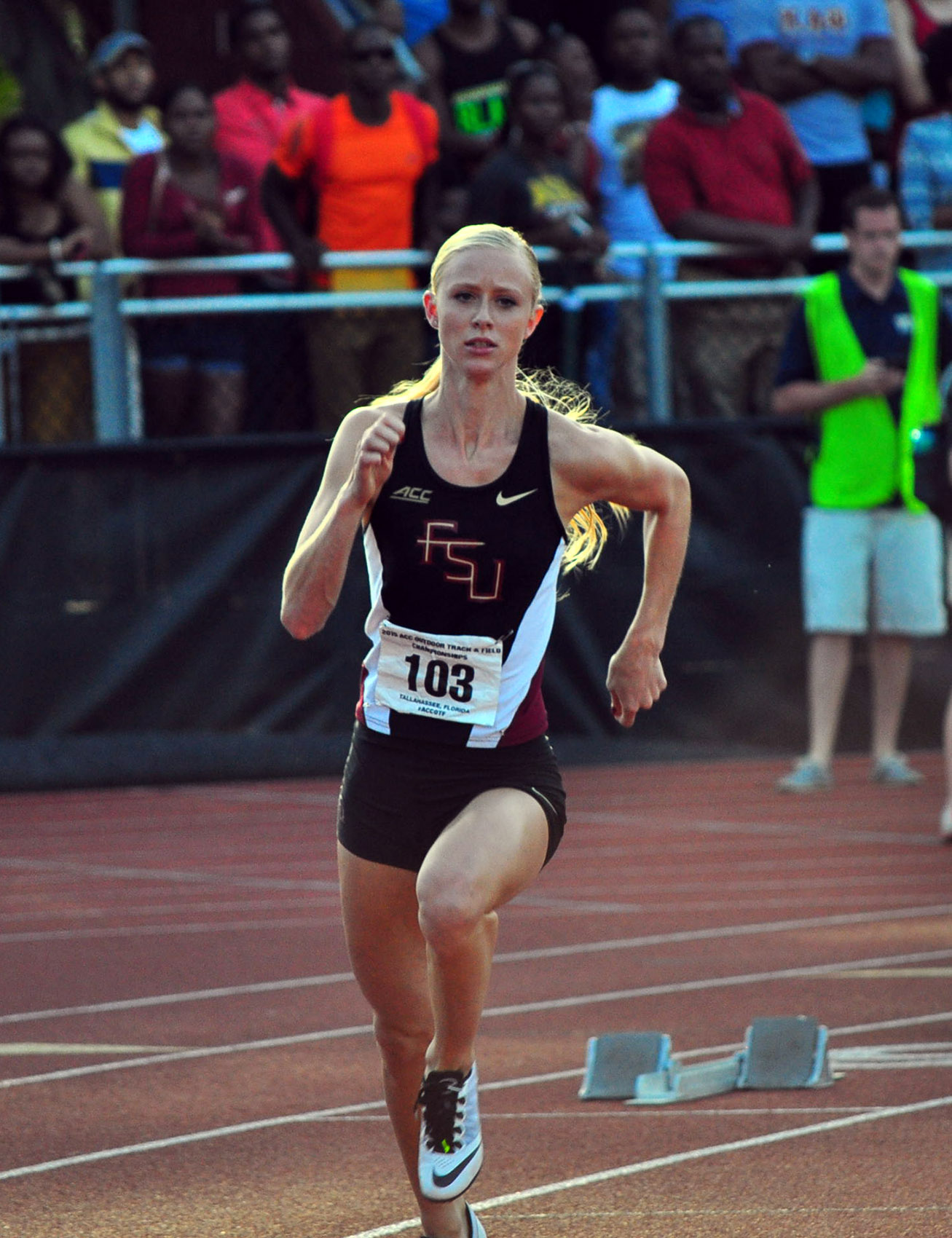
- Sage Watson in 2015

Personal information
- Full name: Sage Heather Walker
- Born: Sage Heather Watson; 20 June 1994 (age 32) Medicine Hat, Alberta, Canada
- Education: Florida State University; University of Arizona '17
- Height: 1.80 m (5 ft 11 in)
- Weight: 57 kg (126 lb)
- Spouse: Brad Walker

Sport
- Sport: Track and field
- Events: 400 metres hurdles 400 metres
- College team: Florida State Seminoles; Arizona Wildcats
- Coached by: Fred Harvey

Achievements and titles
- Personal bests: 400 metres hurdles:54.32 400 meters:51.62
Medal record
Representing Canada
Pan American Games
Gold medal – first place	2019 Lima	400 m hurdles
Silver medal – second place	2019 Lima	4×400 m relay
Bronze medal – third place	2015 Toronto	4×400 m relay
Pan American Junior Championships
Gold medal – first place	2013 Medellín	400 m hurdles
Silver medal – second place	2013 Medellín	4×400 m relay
Bronze medal – third place	2013 Medellín	400 m
World Youth Championships
Bronze medal – third place	2011 Lille	SMR

Sage Heather Walker (née Watson born 20 June 1994) is a Canadian athlete specializing in the 400 metres hurdles. Competing internationally for Canada, she is the reigning Pan American champion in the 400 m hurdles, having also won Pan American medals in 2015 and 2019 as part of Canada's relay team.

== Career ==
Watson first represented her country at the 2015 World Championships in Beijing, where she reached the semifinals. In July 2016 she was officially named to Canada's Olympic team, reaching the semifinals in the 400m hurdles and finishing fourth as part of Canada's women's 4x400 metres relay team.

At the 2017 World Championships, Watson finished sixth. At the 2019 World Championships in Doha, Watson qualified to the final of the 400m hurdles with a national record time of 54.32, breaking the previous record of Rosey Edeh that had stood since 1996.

Watson competed at her second Olympics in Tokyo in 2021. She qualified to the semi-finals of the 400 m hurdles, but placed fifth there and did not advance to the final. The Canadian team in the 4 × 400 m relay finished in fourth place for the second consecutive Olympics, which she remarked afterward "really hurts."

Due to a back injury incurred six weeks before the Tokyo Games, Watson would later announce that she was stepping away from competition to focus on recovery.

== Private life ==
Watson married US Olympic pole vaulter Brad Walker, now a chiropractor. They purchased her grandfather's farm in Alberta.

== International competitions ==
Year	Competition	Venue	Position	Event	Notes
Representing Canada
2011	World Youth Championships	Lille, France	8th	400 m hurdles	61.04
2011	World Youth Championships	Lille, France	3rd	Sprint medley relay	2:05.72
2012	World Junior Championships	Barcelona, Spain	10th (sf)	400 m hurdles	58.04
2012	World Junior Championships	Barcelona, Spain	6th	4 × 400 m relay	3:37.84
2013	Pan American Junior Championships	Medellín, Colombia	3rd	400 m	52.68
2013	Pan American Junior Championships	Medellín, Colombia	1st	400 m hurdles	56.81
2013	Pan American Junior Championships	Medellín, Colombia	2nd	4 × 400 m relay	3:41.53
2015	Pan American Games	Toronto, Canada	10th (h)	400 m hurdles	58.36
2015	Pan American Games	Toronto, Canada	3rd	4 × 400 m relay	3:27.74
2015	World Championships	Beijing, China	19th (sf)	400 m hurdles	56.38
2015	World Championships	Beijing, China	8th	4 × 400 m relay	3:27.69
2016	Olympic Games	Rio de Janeiro, Brazil	11th (sf)	400 m hurdles	55.44
2016	Olympic Games	Rio de Janeiro, Brazil	4th	4 × 400 m relay	3:26.43
2017	World Championships	London, United Kingdom	6th	400 m hurdles	54.92
2018	Commonwealth Games	Gold Coast, Australia	5th	400 m hurdles	55.55
2019	World Relays	Yokohama, Japan	4th	4 × 400 m relay	3:28.21
2019	Pan American Games	Lima, Peru	1st	400 m hurdles	55.16
2019	Pan American Games	Lima, Peru	2nd	4 × 400 m relay	3:27.01
2019	World Championships	Doha, Qatar	8th	400 m hurdles	54.82
2019	World Championships	Doha, Qatar	5th (h)	4 × 400 m relay	3:25.86^{1}
2020	Olympic Games	Tokyo, Japan	5th (sf)	400 m hurdles	55.51
2020	Olympic Games	Tokyo, Japan	4th	4 × 400 m relay	3:21.84
2022	World Indoor Championships	Belgrade, Serbia	8th (h)	4 × 400 m relay	3:31.45

^{1}Disqualified in the final

== Personal bests ==
Outdoor

- 200 metres – 23.80 (-0.2 m/s, Tucson 2017)
- 400 metres – 51.62 (Tucson 2018)
- 400 metres hurdles – 54.32 (Doha 2019)

Indoor

- 400 metres – 51.84 (College Station 2018)
