= Zurian Hechavarría =

Cuban hurdler (born 1995)

Personal information
- Born: 10 August 1995 (age 30) Santiago de Cuba, Cuba
- Height: 1.64 m (5 ft 5 in)
- Weight: 58 kg (128 lb)

Sport
- Sport: Athletics
- Event: 400 metres hurdles
Medal record
Women's athletics
Representing Cuba
Pan American Games
Gold medal – first place	2023 Santiago	4 x 400 m relay
World Relays
Gold medal – first place	2021 Chorzów	4×400 m relay

Zurian Hechavarría Martén (born 10 August 1995) is a Cuban athlete competing in the 400 metres hurdles. She represented her country at the 2016 Summer Olympics without advancing from the first round.

She represented Cuba at the 2020 Summer Olympics.

Her personal best in the event is 54.99 seconds set in Tokyo in 2021.

== International competitions ==
Year	Competition	Venue	Position	Event	Notes
Representing Cuba
2011	World Youth Championships	Lille, France	3rd	400 m hurdles	58.37
2014	World Junior Championships	Eugene, United States	4th	400 m hurdles	56.89
2014	Central American and Caribbean Games	Xalapa, Mexico	3rd	400 m hurdles	57.74
2015	IAAF World Relays	Nassau, Bahamas	1st (B)	4 × 400 m relay	3:30.94
2015	Pan American Games	Toronto, Canada	4th	400 m hurdles	56.72
2015	NACAC Championships	San José, Costa Rica	3rd	400 m hurdles	55.97
2016	NACAC U23 Championships	San Salvador, El Salvador	4th	400 m hurdles	57.17
2016	Olympic Games	Rio de Janeiro, Brazil	32nd (h)	400 m hurdles	57.28
2017	World Championships	London, United Kingdom	24th (h)	400 m hurdles	56.44
2018	Central American and Caribbean Games	Barranquilla, Colombia	3rd	400 m hurdles	55.13
2018	Central American and Caribbean Games	Barranquilla, Colombia	1st	4 × 400 m relay	3:29.48
2018	NACAC Championships	Toronto, Canada	4th	400 m hurdles	55.71
2019	Pan American Games	Lima, Peru	4th	400 m hurdles	55.85
2019	Pan American Games	Lima, Peru	4th	4 × 400 m relay	3:30.89
2019	World Championships	Doha, Qatar	9th (sf)	400 m hurdles	55.03
2019	World Championships	Doha, Qatar	13th (h)	4 × 400 m relay	3:29.84
2021	World Relays	Chorzów, Poland	1st	4 × 400 m relay	3:28.41
2021	Olympic Games	Tokyo, Japan	12th (sf)	400 m hurdles	55.21
2021	Olympic Games	Tokyo, Japan	8th	4 × 400 m relay	3:26.92
2022	Ibero-American Championships	La Nucía, Spain	4th	400 m hurdles	55.68
2023	Central American and Caribbean Games	San Salvador, El Salvador	1st	400 m hurdles	55.52
2023	Central American and Caribbean Games	San Salvador, El Salvador	1st	4 × 400 m relay	3:26.08
2023	World Championships	Budapest, Hungary	33rd (h)	400 m hurdles	56.43
2023	World Championships	Budapest, Hungary	13th (h)	4 × 400 m relay	3:29.70
2023	Pan American Games	Santiago, Chile	5th	400 m hurdles	57.70
2023	Pan American Games	Santiago, Chile	1st	4 × 400 m relay	3:33.15
