= Jade Miller =

South African politician

Jade Miller MPL

Member of the Gauteng Provincial Legislature
- Incumbent
- Assumed office August 2022

Personal details
- Born: 31 August 1985 (age 40)
- Party: Democratic Alliance (South Africa)

Jade Miller (born 31 August 1985) is a South African politician from Gauteng. She has represented the Democratic Alliance (DA) in the Gauteng Provincial Legislature since August 2022.

== Life and career ==
Miller was born on 31 August 1985. She matriculated at Krugersdorp High School in Krugersdorp, Gauteng and completed a BA in corporate communications at the University of Johannesburg.

She joined the Democratic Alliance (DA) in 2013. In 2016, she entered government as a local councillor in the Mogale City Local Municipality; she was elected as the DA's chief whip in the council in 2021.

In August 2022, Miller was sworn into a DA seat in the Gauteng Provincial Legislature, filling a casual vacancy. In the next general election in May 2024, she was elected to a full term in the legislature, ranked 20th on the DA's provincial party list. She is the DA's shadow minister in the environment portfolio.

== Personal life ==
She has two children.
