= Belgium at the 2025 World Athletics Championships =

- Flag of Belgium
- WA code: BEL

in Tokyo, Japan 13 September 2025 – 21 September 2025
- Competitors: 38 (22 men and 16 women)
- Medals Ranked 25th: Gold 0 Silver 1 Bronze 1 Total 2

World Athletics Championships appearances (overview)
- 1983; 1987; 1991; 1993; 1995; 1997; 1999; 2001; 2003; 2005; 2007; 2009; 2011; 2013; 2015; 2017; 2019; 2022; 2023; 2025

Belgium competed at the 2025 World Athletics Championships in Tokyo, Japan, from 13 to 21 September 2025. Belgium entered 47 athletes, 26 individual athletes and five relay teams.

== Medalists ==
Medal	Athlete	Event	Date
Silver	Isaac Kimeli	Men's 5000 m	September 21
Bronze	Dylan Borlée; Alexander Doom; Helena Ponette; Jonathan Sacoor*; Imke Vervaet	Mixed 4 × 400 m relay	September 13

* – Indicates the athlete competed in preliminaries but not the final

== Results ==
Key

- Q = Qualified for the next round
- q = Qualified for the next round as a fastest loser or, in field events, by position without achieving the qualifying target
- NR = National record
- PB = Personal best
- SB = Season best
- DNS = Did not start
- DNF = Did not finish
- DQ = Disqualified
- N/A = Round not applicable for the event

=== Men ===
Track and road events

Athlete	Event	Heat		Semifinal		Final	
Athlete	Event	Result	Rank	Result	Rank	Result	Rank
Alexander Doom	400 metres	45.10	6	Did not advance			
Daniel Segers	400 metres	45.04	4	Did not advance			
Eliott Crestan	800 metres	1:45.05	5 q	1:44.56	8	Did not advance	
Pieter Sisk	800 metres	1:46.37	7	Did not advance			
Pieter Sisk	1500 metres	3:43.50	11	Did not advance			
Ruben Verheyden	1500 metres	3:41.45	5 Q	3:36.31	10	Did not advance	
Jochem Vermeulen	1500 metres	3:37.33	8	Did not advance			
John Heymans	5000 metres	13:47.37	13	—N/a		Did not advance	
Isaac Kimeli	5000 metres	13:13.06	1 Q	—N/a		12:58.78 SB	2nd place, silver medalist(s)
Koen Naert	Marathon	—N/a				2:12:52	17
Elie Bacari	110 metres hurdles	13.55	6	Did not advance			
Michael Obasuyi	110 metres hurdles	13.54	5	Did not advance			
Tim Van de Velde	3000 metres steeplechase	9:02.21	11	—N/a		Did not advance	
Emiel Botterman; Antoine Snyders; Simon Verherstraeten; Kobe Vleminckx	4 × 100 metres relay	38.46	5 NR	—N/a		Did not advance	
Dylan Borlée*; Alexander Doom; Jonathan Sacoor; Daniel Segers; Robin Vanderbemden	4 × 400 metres relay	2:57.98 SB	2 Q	—N/a		2:59.48	4

Field events

Athlete	Event	Qualification		Final	
Athlete	Event	Distance	Position	Distance	Position
Thomas Carmoy	High jump	2.25	12 q	2.20	=11
Ben Broeders	Pole vault	5.70	16	Did not advance	

Combined events – Decathlon

Athlete	Event	100 m	LJ	SP	HJ	400 m	110H	DT	PV	JT	1500 m	Final	Rank
Jente Hauttekeete	Result	10.85	7.04	14.58	1.99	49.36	14.49	44.09	5.00	55.44	4:27.91 PB	8116	10
Jente Hauttekeete	Points	894	823	764	794	844	912	748	910	669	758	8116	10

=== Women ===
Track and road events

Athlete	Event	Heat		Semifinal		Final	
Athlete	Event	Result	Rank	Result	Rank	Result	Rank
Rani Rosius	100 metres	11.25 SB	4	Did not advance			
Imke Vervaet	200 metres	22.74	3 Q	22.79	6	Did not advance	
Elise Vanderelst	5000 metres	15:00.52	11	—N/a		Did not advance	
Jana Van Lent	5000 metres	15:14.93	17	—N/a		Did not advance	
Jana Van Lent	10000 metres	—N/a				31:44.05	13
Yanla Ndjip-Nyemeck	100 metres hurdles	12.74	4 q	13.05	6	Did not advance	
Paulien Couckuyt	400 metres hurdles	55.08	5 q	54.69	6	Did not advance	
Naomi Van den Broeck	400 metres hurdles	54.70	3 Q	53.65 NR	3 q	53.70	6
Janie De Naeyer; Delphine Nkansa; Rani Rosius; Rani Vincke	4 × 100 metres relay	DQ		—N/a		Did not advance	
Camille Laus; Helena Ponette; Naomi Van Den Broeck; Imke Vervaet	4 × 400 metres relay	3:23.96	2 Q	—N/a		3:22.15 SB	4

Field events

Athlete	Event	Qualification		Final	
Athlete	Event	Distance	Position	Distance	Position
Merel Maes	High jump	1.88	=12 q	1.93	10
Elien Vekemans	Pole vault	4.45	17	Did not advance	
Ilona Masson	Triple jump	13.79	19	Did not advance	

Combined events – Heptathlon

Athlete	Event	100H	HJ	SP	200 m	LJ	JT	800 m	Final	Rank
Nafissatou Thiam	Result	13.61	1.89	14.85	25.52	5.99	DNS	-	DNF	
Nafissatou Thiam	Points	1034	1093	851	840	846	0	-	DNF	

=== Mixed ===
Track events

Athlete	Event	Heat		Final	
Athlete	Event	Result	Rank	Result	Rank
Dylan Borlée; Alexander Doom; Jonathan Sacoor*; Helena Ponette; Imke Vervaet	4 × 400 metres relay	3:10.37 SB	1 Q	3:10.61	3rd place, bronze medalist(s)

* – Indicates the athlete competed in preliminaries but not the final
