= 20 km of Brussels =

20 km running race held every year in Brussels, Belgium

Coordinates: 50.8214°N 4.4047°E

Logo

The 20 km of Brussels (French: 20 km de Bruxelles, Dutch: 20 km door Brussel) is a 20.1 km running race that has been held each year in Brussels since 1980, usually in May. It used to have a maximum number of 25,000 entries, which were normally sold out quite quickly after places go on sale in March, but in 2010 a staggered start-time approach led to an increased maximum number of entries of 40,000.

The race is a major event in Brussels, with a large turnout of supporters. The course is quite challenging, particularly due to the gentle, long overall climb and several tunnels between kilometer three and seven as well as the long and steep climb on Avenue de Tervueren towards the end of the race.

The exact course distance has varied over time. The 2014 course officially covers 20.1 km. The course often did not cover a complete 20 km circuit in its early history. The 2000 race was significantly shorter than the full distance and both the men's and women's winners finished the race more than three minutes ahead of the world records at the time.

== Past winners ==
KEY: Course record

Italics = Short course

Year	Men's race	Country	Time (h:m:s)	Women's race	Country	Time (h:m:s)
2018	Hassan Chahdi	France	1:02:56	Alexandra Tondeur	Belgium	1:14:38
2017	David Maru	Kenya	1:00:37	Sophie Hardy	Belgium	1:13:42
2016	Regis Thonon	Belgium	1:02:07	Manuela Soccol	Belgium	1:13:51
2015	Abdelhadi El Hachimi	Belgium	1:01:47	Manuela Soccol	Belgium	1:13:48
2014	Gilbert Kipruto Kirwa	Kenya	59:05	Ria Thienpondt	Belgium	1:17:21
2013	Peter Kariuki Wanjiru	Kenya	59:22	Catherine Lallemand	Belgium	1:13:07
2012	Faisa Tasama Dame	Ethiopia	1:00:52	Francine Niyonizigiye	Burundi	1:13:09
2011	Najim El Qady	Morocco	59:41	Francine Niyonizigiye	Burundi	1:12:08
2010	Onesphore Nkunzimana	Burundi	1:01:29	Alemitu Bekele	Belgium	1:11:42
2009	Najim El Qady	Morocco	1:00:00	Alemitu Bekele	Belgium	1:16:38
2008	Willy Kiptarbei	Kenya	1:00:36	Fatiha Baouf	Belgium	1:10:56
2007	Abduh Bakhet Mohamed	Qatar	1:00:23	Catherine Lallemand	Belgium	1:12:13
2006	Rik Ceulemans	Belgium	1:02:37	Catherine Lallemand	Belgium	1:12:21
2005	Koen van Rie	Belgium	1:02:06	Catherine Lallemand	Belgium	1:10:05
2004	Jussi Utriainen	Finland	1:00:59	Marleen Renders	Belgium	1:10:45
2003	Jussi Utriainen	Finland	1:02:38	Marleen Renders	Belgium	1:08:54
2002	Ahmed Jaber	Qatar	1:02:03	Marleen Renders	Belgium	1:07:46
2001	Joseph Sitienei	Kenya	1:01:23	Marleen Renders	Belgium	1:10:48
2000	Simon Kasimili	Kenya	52:42	Marleen Renders	Belgium	1:00:07
1999	Mohammed Mourhit	Belgium	1:00:32	Marleen Renders	Belgium	1:10:25
1998	Ondoro Osoro	Kenya	56:15	Marleen Renders	Belgium	1:05:07
1997	Simon Bor	Kenya	55:59	Marleen Renders	Belgium	1:03:32
1996	Wilson Omwoyo	Kenya	55:41	Marleen Renders	Belgium	1:03:57
1995	Vincent Rousseau	Belgium	56:30	Lieve Slegers	Belgium	1:03:27
1994	Julius Ondieki	Kenya	56:06	Lyudmila Afonjushkina	Russia	1:05:38
1993	Julius Ondieki	Kenya	56:58	Lidia Chulanova	Russia	1:06:48
1992	David Long	United Kingdom	57:48	Maria Ostrovskaya	Ukraine	1:08:20
1991	Ivan Uvizl	Czech Republic	57:28	Ria Van Landeghem	Belgium	1:07:06
1990	Douglas Wakiihuri	Kenya	57:21	Veronique Marot	United Kingdom	1:06:12
1989	Michael McLeod	United Kingdom	58:23	Veronique Marot	United Kingdom	1:07:01
1988	Steve Brace	United Kingdom	59:17	Francine Peeters	Belgium	1:08:03
1987	Dirk Vanderherten	Belgium	57:50	Agnes Pardaens	Belgium	1:05:23
1986	Dirk Vanderherten	Belgium	58:40	De Bruycker	Belgium	1:08:24
1985	Christopher Woodhouse	United Kingdom	58:58	Nfn van Bost	Belgium	1:13:11
1984	Alex Hagelsteens	Belgium	57:15	Denise Verhaert	Belgium	1:08:47
1983	Dirk Vanderherten	Belgium	58:00	Denise Verhaert	Belgium	1:08:47
1982	Frederik Vandervennet	Belgium	1:00:00	Daniele Justin	Belgium	1:12:42
1981	Frederik Vandervennet	Belgium	59:00	De Beyns	Belgium	1:07:00
1980	Werner Mory	Belgium	1:03:00	Magda Ilands	Belgium	1:15.00

== See also ==
- Brussels Marathon
