= Belgium at the 2017 World Championships in Athletics =

- Flag of Belgium
- WA code: BEL
- National federation: Royal Belgian Athletics League
- Website: belgian-athletics.be

in London, United Kingdom 4–13 August 2017
- Competitors: 16 (11 men and 5 women) in 12 events
- Medals Ranked =23rd: Gold 1 Silver 0 Bronze 0 Total 1

World Championships in Athletics appearances
- 1983; 1987; 1991; 1993; 1995; 1997; 1999; 2001; 2003; 2005; 2007; 2009; 2011; 2013; 2015; 2017; 2019; 2022; 2023; 2025

Belgium competed at the 2017 World Championships in Athletics in London, United Kingdom, 4–13 August 2017.

== Medalists ==
Medal	Name	Event	Date
Gold	Nafissatou Thiam	Heptathlon	6 August

== Results ==
=== Men ===
Track and road events

Athlete	Event	Heat		Semifinal		Final	
Athlete	Event	Result	Rank	Result	Rank	Result	Rank
Jonathan Borlée	400 metres	45.70	20 q	45.23	16	Did not advance	
Kevin Borlée	400 metres	45.09	11 Q	45.10	11	Did not advance	
Ismael Debjani	1500 metres	3:43.71	22	Did not advance			
Bashir Abdi	5000 metres	13:30.71	19	—N/a		Did not advance	
Soufiane Bouchikhi	5000 metres	13:28.64	11	—N/a		Did not advance	
Abdelhadi El Hachimi	Marathon	—N/a				DNF	–
Robin Vanderbemden; Jonathan Borlée; Dylan Borlée; Kevin Borlée	4 × 400 metres relay	2:59.47 SB	3 Q	—N/a		3:00.04	4

Field events

Athlete	Event	Qualification		Final	
Athlete	Event	Distance	Position	Distance	Position
Arnaud Art	Pole vault	5.60	9 q	NH	–
Philip Milanov	Discus throw	63.16	14	Did not advance	

Combined events – Decathlon

Athlete	Event	100 m	LJ	SP	HJ	400 m	110H	DT	PV	JT	1500 m	Final	Rank
Thomas Van der Plaetsen	Result	11.35	7.09	13.03	1.96	DNS	–	–	–	–	–	DNF	–
Thomas Van der Plaetsen	Points	784	835	669	767	0						DNF	–

=== Women ===
Track and road events

Athlete	Event	Heat		Semifinal		Final	
Athlete	Event	Result	Rank	Result	Rank	Result	Rank
Eline Berings	100 metres hurdles	13.35	33	Did not advance			
Anne Zagré	100 metres hurdles	12.97	15 Q	13.34	24	Did not advance	

Field events

Athlete	Event	Qualification		Final	
Athlete	Event	Distance	Position	Distance	Position
Nafissatou Thiam	High jump	DNS	–	Did not advance	
Fanny Smets	Pole vault	4.20	20	Did not advance	

Combined events – Heptathlon

Athlete	Event	100H	HJ	SP	200 m	LJ	JT	800 m	Final	Rank
Hanne Maudens	Result	14.47	1.77	11.80	25.43	6.15	35.44	2:12.87	5749	23
Hanne Maudens	Points	850	941	648	848	896	580	923	5749	23
Nafissatou Thiam	Result	13.54	1.95	15.17	24.57	6.57	53.93	2:21.42	6784	1st place, gold medalist(s)
Nafissatou Thiam	Points	1044	1171	872	927	1030	936	804	6784	1st place, gold medalist(s)
