= Belgium at the 2022 World Athletics Championships =

- Flag of Belgium
- WA code: BEL
- National federation: Royal Belgian Athletics League

in Eugene, United States 15–24 July 2022
- Competitors: 30 (17 men and 13 women)
- Medals Ranked 16th: Gold 1 Silver 0 Bronze 2 Total 3

World Athletics Championships appearances (overview)
- 1983; 1987; 1991; 1993; 1995; 1997; 1999; 2001; 2003; 2005; 2007; 2009; 2011; 2013; 2015; 2017; 2019; 2022; 2023; 2025

Belgium competed at the 2022 World Athletics Championships in Eugene, United States, from 15 to 24 July 2022. Belgium entered 32 athletes.

== Medalists ==
| Medal | Athlete | Event | Date |
|---|---|---|---|
| Gold | Nafissatou Thiam | Heptathlon | July 18 |
| Bronze | Bashir Abdi | Men's marathon | July 17 |
| Bronze | Dylan Borlée; Kevin Borlée; Alexander Doom; Jonathan Sacoor*; Julien Watrin | Men's 4 × 400 metres relay | July 24 |

* – Indicates the athlete competed in preliminaries but not the final

== Entrants ==
- including alternates

Key

- Note–Ranks given for track events are within the athlete's heat only
- Q = Qualified for the next round
- q = Qualified for the next round as a fastest loser or, in field events, by position without achieving the qualifying target
- NR = National record
- CHB = Championship best
- WL = World Leading
- PB = Personal best
- SB = Season's best
- — = Round not applicable for the event
- Bye = Athlete not required to compete in round
- DNS = Did not start
- NM = No valid trial recorded

=== Men ===
Track and road events

| Athlete | Event | Heat | | Semi-final | | Final | |
| Athlete | Event | Result | Rank | Result | Rank | Result | Rank |
|---|---|---|---|---|---|---|---|
| Dylan Borlée | 400 metres | 45.70 | 2 Q | 45.41 | 5 | did not advance | |
| Kevin Borlée | 400 metres | 45.72 | 4 q | 45.26 | 5 | did not advance | |
| Alexander Doom | 400 metres | 46.18 | 3 Q | 45.80 | 6 | did not advance | |
| Elliot Crestan | 800 metres | 1:46.61 | 4 | did not advance | | | |
| Ismael Debjani | 1500 metres | 3:39.96 | 12 | did not advance | | | |
| Ruben Verheyden | 1500 metres | 3:39.46 | 7 | did not advance | | | |
| Isaac Kimeli | 10,000 metres | —N/a | | | | 27:43.50 SB | 10 |
| Bashir Abdi | Marathon | —N/a | | | | 2:06:48 | 3rd place, bronze medalist(s) |
| Lahsene Bouchikhi | Marathon | —N/a | | | | DNF | |
| Thomas De Bock | Marathon | —N/a | | | | 2:11:54 SB | 30 |
| Julien Watrin | 400 metres hurdles | 49.83 | 2 Q | 49.52 | 3 | did not advance | |
| Tim Van De Velde | 3000 metres steeplechase | 9:03.11 | 13 | —N/a | | did not advance | |
| Dylan Borlée; Kevin Borlée; Alexander Doom; Jonathan Sacoor^{1} Julien Watrin | 4 × 400 metres relay | 3:01.96 Q SB | 1 | —N/a | | 2:58.72 SB | 3rd place, bronze medalist(s) |

^{1}Ran only in the heats

Field events

| Athlete | Event | Qualification | | Final | |
| Athlete | Event | Distance | Position | Distance | Position |
|---|---|---|---|---|---|
| Thomas Carmoy | High jump | 2.25 | 17 | did not advance | |
| Ben Broeders | Pole vault | 5.75 | 4 q | 5.70 | 11 |
| Philip Milanov | Discus throw | 61.47 | 21 | did not advance | |

=== Women ===
Track and road events

| Athlete | Event | Heat | | Semi-final | | Final | |
| Athlete | Event | Result | Rank | Result | Rank | Result | Rank |
|---|---|---|---|---|---|---|---|
| Imke Vervaet | 200 metres | 23.28 | 5 | did not advance | | | |
| Camille Laus | 400 metres | 52.56 | 6 | did not advance | | | |
| Naomi Van Den Broeck | 400 metres | 53.16 | 7 | did not advance | | | |
| Vanessa Scaunet | 800 metres | 2:04.07 | 7 | did not advance | | | |
| Elise Vanderelst | 1500 metres | 4:10.45 | 11 | did not advance | | | |
| Mieke Gorissen | Marathon | —N/a | | | | 2:31:06 SB | 19 |
| Anne Zagré | 100 metres hurdles | 13.25 | 5 | did not advance | | | |
| Anne Zagré | 100 metres hurdles | 14.09 | 1 | did not advance | | | |
| Paulien Couckuyt | 400 metres hurdles | 55.42 Q | 4 | 55.42 | 5 | did not advance | |
| Paulien Couckuyt^{1} Nina Hespel^{2} Camille Laus; Helena Ponette; Naomi Van Den Broeck^{3} Imke Vervaet | 4 × 400 metres relay | 3:28.02 Q SB | 2 | —N/a | | 3:26.29 SB | 6 |

^{1}Ran only in the finale
^{2}Reserve. Did not run in either the heats or final
^{3}Ran only in the heats

Field events

| Athlete | Event | Qualification | | Final | |
| Athlete | Event | Distance | Position | Distance | Position |
|---|---|---|---|---|---|
| Vanessa Sterckendries | Hammer throw | 67.88 | 24 | did not advance | |

Combined events – Heptathlon

| Athlete | Event | 100H | HJ | SP | 200 m | LJ | JT | 800 m | Final | Rank |
|---|---|---|---|---|---|---|---|---|---|---|
| Nafissatou Thiam | Result | 13.21 PB | 1.95 =CHB | 15.03 SB | 24.39 | 6.59 | 53.01 SB | 2:13.00 PB | 6947 WL | 1st place, gold medalist(s) |
| Nafissatou Thiam | Points | 1093 | 1171 | 863 | 944 | 1036 | 919 | 921 | 6947 WL | 1st place, gold medalist(s) |
| Noor Vidts | Result | 13.20 SB | 1.83 | 14.43 PB | 23.92 SB | 6.33 | 41.62 SB | 2:08.50 PB | 6559 SB | 5 |
| Noor Vidts | Points | 1094 | 1016 | 823 | 988 | 953 | 698 SB | 987 | 6559 SB | 5 |

=== Mixed ===
Track and road events

| Athlete | Event | Heat | | Final | |
| Athlete | Event | Result | Rank | Result | Rank |
|---|---|---|---|---|---|
| Kevin Borlée; Alexander Doom; Christian Iguacel; Camille Laus; Helena Ponette; Naomi Van Den Broeck | 4 × 400 metres relay | 3:16.01 SB | 7 | did not advance | |
