= Belgium at the 2015 World Championships in Athletics =

- WA code: BEL
- National federation: Ligue Royale Belge d'Athlétisme
- Website: www.val.be

in Beijing
- Competitors: 18
- Medals Ranked 25th: Gold 0 Silver 1 Bronze 0 Total 1

World Championships in Athletics appearances
- 1983; 1987; 1991; 1993; 1995; 1997; 1999; 2001; 2003; 2005; 2007; 2009; 2011; 2013; 2015; 2017; 2019; 2022; 2023; 2025

Belgium competed at the 2015 World Championships in Athletics in Beijing, China, from 22–30 August 2015.

== Medalists ==
Medal	Athlete	Event	Date
Silver	Philip Milanov	Discus throw	August 29

== Results ==
(q – qualified, NM – no mark, SB – season best)

=== Men ===
Track and road events

Athlete	Event	Heat		Semifinal		Final	
Athlete	Event	Result	Rank	Result	Rank	Result	Rank
Jonathan Borlée	400 metres	44.67 SB	13 Q	44.85	14	did not advance	
Kevin Borlée	400 metres	45.01 SB	19 Q	44.74 SB	11	did not advance	
Pieter-Jan Hannes	1500 metres	3:39.31	14 Q	3:44.38	20	did not advance	
Bashir Abdi	5000 metres	DNS		—N/a		did not advance	
Bashir Abdi	10,000 metres	—N/a				DNF	
Abdelhadi El Hachimi	Marathon	—N/a				2:17:41	16
Michaël Bultheel	400 metres hurdles	49.38	22 q	49.66	22	did not advance	
Jeroen D'hoedt	3000 metres steeplechase	DNS		—N/a		did not advance	
Jonathan Borlée; Kevin Borlée; Antoine Gillet; Robin Vanderbemden; Dylan Borlée*	4 × 400 metres relay	2:59.28 NR	5 Q	—N/a		3:00.24	5

Field events

Athlete	Event	Qualification		Final	
Athlete	Event	Distance	Position	Distance	Position
Arnaud Art	Pole vault	5.40	31	did not advance	
Philip Milanov	Discus throw	63.85	8 q	66.90 NR	2nd place, silver medalist(s)

Combined events – Decathlon

Athlete	Event	100 m	LJ	SP	HJ	400 m	110H	DT	PV	JT	1500 m	Final	Rank
Thomas van der Plaetsen	Result	11.44	7.42 SB	13.83 SB	2.13 SB	50.28 SB	14.76	43.01 SB	5.30 SB	55.23	4:47.38 SB	8035 SB	14
Thomas van der Plaetsen	Points	765	915	718	925	802	879	726	1004	666	635	8035 SB	14
Niels Pittomvils	Result	11.39	6.86	12.77	1.92	49.45 SB	15.09	39.90	NM	52.96	4:27.40 PB	6678	22
Niels Pittomvils	Points	776	781	653	731	840	839	663	0	633	762	6678	22

=== Women ===
Track and road events

Athlete	Event	Heat		Semifinal		Final	
Athlete	Event	Result	Rank	Result	Rank	Result	Rank
Cynthia Bolingo	200 metres	23.45	43	did not advance			
Almensh Belete	10,000 metres	—N/a				32:47.62 SB	21
Anne Zagré	100 metres hurdles	12.90	11 Q	12.88	11	did not advance	
Axelle Dauwens	400 metres hurdles	55.84 SB	16 q	55.82 SB	12	did not advance	

Combined events – Heptathlon

Athlete	Event	100H	HJ	SP	200 m	LJ	JT	800 m	Final	Rank
Nafissatou Thiam	Result	13.83	1.86	15.24 PB	25.28	6.14	49.31	2:24.55	6298	11
Nafissatou Thiam	Points	1003	1054	877	861	893	847	26	6298	11
