= Belgium at the 2019 World Athletics Championships =

Belgium at the 2019 World Championships in Athletics
- WA code: BEL

in Doha, Qatar
- Medals Ranked 24th: Gold 0 Silver 1 Bronze 1 Total 2

World Championships in Athletics appearances
- 1983; 1987; 1991; 1993; 1995; 1997; 1999; 2001; 2003; 2005; 2007; 2009; 2011; 2013; 2015; 2017; 2019; 2022; 2023

Belgium competed at the 2019 World Championships in Athletics in Doha, Qatar from 27 September to 6 October 2019. Belgium has entered 29 athletes. The country finished in 24th place in the medal table.

== Medalists ==
Medal	Athlete	Event	Date
Silver	Nafissatou Thiam	Women's heptathlon	October 4
Bronze	Jonathan Sacoor; Robin Vanderbemden; Dylan Borlée; Kevin Borlée; Julien Watrin*	Men's 4 × 400 metres relay	October 6

* – Indicates the athlete competed in preliminaries but not the final

== Entrants ==
- including alternates

Key

- Note–Ranks given for track events are within the athlete's heat only
- Q = Qualified for the next round
- q = Qualified for the next round as a fastest loser or, in field events, by position without achieving the qualifying target
- NR = National record
- CHB = Championship best
- WL = World Leading
- PB = Personal best
- SB = Season's best
- N/A = Round not applicable for the event
- Bye = Athlete not required to compete in round
- DNS = Did not start
- NM = No valid trial recorded

=== Men ===
Track and road events

Athlete	Event	Heat		Semifinal		Final	
Athlete	Event	Result	Rank	Result	Rank	Result	Rank
Jonathan Sacoor	400 metres	45.32	2 Q	45.03 PB	4	did not advance	
Ismael Debjani	1500 metres	3:29:11	10	did not advance			
Robin Hendrix	5000 metres	13:39.69	13	—		did not advance	
Isaac Kimeli	5000 metres	13:20.99 q	6	—		13:44.29	14
Soufiane Bouchikhi	10,000 metres	—				28:15.43	13
Thomas De Bock	Marathon	—				2:21:13	42
Dylan Borlée; Kevin Borlée; Alexander Doom; Jonathan Sacoor; Robin Vanderbemden; Julien Watrin	4 × 400 metres relay	3:00.87 Q SB	2	—		2:58.78 SB	3rd place, bronze medalist(s)

Field events

Athlete	Event	Qualification		Final	
Athlete	Event	Distance	Position	Distance	Position
Ben Broeders	Pole vault	5.70 q	6	5.55	12
Philip Milanov	Discus throw	60.24	15	did not advance	

Combined events – Decathlon

Athlete	Event	100 m	LJ	SP	HJ	400 m	110H	DT	PV	JT	1500 m	Final	Rank
Thomas van der Plaetsen	Result	11.38	7.20	13.78	2.08	50.89	14.80	46.17	5.30	63.67	4:43.05	8125	9
Thomas van der Plaetsen	Points	778	862	715	878	774	874	791	1004	793	656	8125	9

=== Women ===
Track and road events

Athlete	Event	Heat		Semifinal		Final	
Athlete	Event	Result	Rank	Result	Rank	Result	Rank
Imke Vervaet	200 metres	23.24 PB	5	did not advance			
Renée Eykens	800 metres	2:03.65	6	did not advance			
Manuela Soccol	Marathon	—				2:59:11	31
Hanna Vandenbussche	Marathon	—				DNF	
Anne Zagré	100 metres hurdles	12.91 Q SB	3	DQ		did not advance	
Hanne Claes	400 metres hurdles	57.15	6	did not advance			
Hanne Claes; Paulien Couckuyt; Manon Depuydt; Camille Laus; Liefde Schoemaker; Imke Vervaet	4 × 400 metres relay	3:26.58 q NR	4	—		3:27.15	5

Field events

Athlete	Event	Qualification		Final	
Athlete	Event	Distance	Position	Distance	Position
Claire Orcel	High jump	1.92 q	11	1.89	11
Fanny Smets	Pole vault	4.40	20	did not advance	

Combined events – Heptathlon

Athlete	Event	100H	HJ	SP	200 m	LJ	JT	800 m	Final	Rank
Nafissatou Thiam	Result	13.36	1.95	15.22	24.60	6.40	48.04	2:18.93 PB	6677	2nd place, silver medalist(s)
Nafissatou Thiam	Points	1071	1171	876	924	975	822	838	6677	2nd place, silver medalist(s)
Hanne Maudens	Result	13.90 PB	1.71	13.12	23.81 PB	6.41	36.22	2:12.98	6088	11
Hanne Maudens	Points	933	867	735	999	978	595	921	6088	11
Noor Vidts	Result	13.58	1.77	13.55	24.46	6.11	33.58	2:15.94	5989	15
Noor Vidts	Points	1039	941	764	937	883	545	880	5989	15

=== Mixed ===
Track and road events

Athlete	Event	Heat		Semifinal		Final	
Athlete	Event	Result	Rank	Result	Rank	Result	Rank
Dylan Borlée; Hanne Claes; Camille Laus; Kevin Borlée; Robin Vanderbemden*; Imke Vervaet*	4 × 400 metres relay	3:16.16 NR	8 q	—		3:14.22 NR	6
