= Belgium at the 2007 World Championships in Athletics =

- WA code: BEL
- National federation: Vlaamse Atletiek Liga
- Website: www.val.be

in Osaka
- Competitors: 18
- Medals: Gold 0 Silver 0 Bronze 1 Total 1

World Championships in Athletics appearances
- 1983; 1987; 1991; 1993; 1995; 1997; 1999; 2001; 2003; 2005; 2007; 2009; 2011; 2013; 2015; 2017; 2019; 2022; 2023; 2025

Belgium competed at the 2007 World Championships in Athletics with 18 athletes. Only one bronze medal was won by the Women's 4 × 100 m Relay team in a new National Record of 42.75. With this result, Belgium finished 36th in the Medal Table and 35th in the placing table.

== Competitors ==
=== Men ===
200 m: Kristof Beyens
110 m Hurdles: Adrien Deghelt
3000 m Steeplechase: Pieter Desmet, Krijn Van Koolwyk
Pole Vault: Kevin Rans
Decathlon: Hans Van Alphen, François Gourmet

=== Women ===
100 m: Kim Gevaert
200 m: Kim Gevaert
10,000 m: Nathalie De Vos
100 m Hurdles: Eline Berings
400m Hurdles: Élodie Ouédraogo
3,000 m Steeplechase: Veerle Dejaeghere, Sigrid Vanden Bempt, Stephanie De Croock
High Jump: Tia Hellebaut
4 × 100 m Relay: Kim Gevaert, Olivia Borlée, Hanna Mariën, Élodie Ouédraogo, Elisabeth Davin, Eline Berings

== Results ==
=== Men ===
Track and road events

Event	Athletes	Heats		Quarterfinal		Semifinal		Final	
Event	Athletes	Result	Rank	Result	Rank	Result	Rank	Result	Rank
200 m	Kristof Beyens	20.44 PB	7 Q	20.52	14 Q	20.53	13	Did not advance	
110 m hurdles	Adrien Deghelt	13.61	20 q	—		13.70	20	Did not advance	
3000 m steeplechase	Krijn Van Koolwyk	8:29.18	15th	—				Did not advance	
3000 m steeplechase	Pieter Desmet	8:55.99	33	—				Did not advance	

Field events

Event	Athletes	Qualification		Final	
Event	Athletes	Result	Rank	Result	Rank
Pole vault	Kevin Rans	5.40	21	Did not advance	

=== Women ===
Round	Position	Discipline	Athlete	Result
Final	3rd	4 × 100 m relay	Olivia Borlee; Kim Gevaert; Hanna Mariën; Élodie Ouédraogo	42.75 (NR)
Final	5th	100 m	Kim Gevaert	11"05
Final	11th	3,000 m steeplechase	Veerle Dejaeghere	9'40"10
Final		High jump	Tia Hellebaut	
Semi-finals	DNS	200 m	Kim Gevaert	-
Heats	q	100 m hurdles	Eline Berings	12"97 (NR)
Heats	q	400 m hurdles	Élodie Ouédraogo	56"44
Heats	q	3,000 m steeplechase	Stephanie de Croock	10'01"74
Heats	q	3,000 m steeplechase	Sigrid Vanden Bempt	DNF
