= Greifenseelauf =

- Date: September
- Location: Uster, (Switzerland)
- Event type: Road
- Distance: Half marathon, 10K run
- Primary sponsor: Migros, Zürcher Kantonalbank
- Established: 1980/1992
- Course records: Men's: 1:01:14.5 (2012) (Kenya) Jacob Kendagor; Women's: 1:08:39.1 (2002) (Kenya) Joyce Chepchumba
- Website: Greifenseelauf
- Participants: 2,302 finishers (2021); 2,753 (2020); 5,889 (2019)

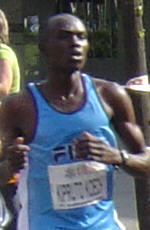
Nicholas Koech, the 2006 and 2007 winner

The Greifenseelauf is an annual road running event in the Swiss Canton of Zurich, that was established in 1980 and takes place in the middle of September.

From 1980 to 1985 the course ran over a distance of 19 km, from 1986 to 1991 over 19.5 km. Ever since 1992 the distance of the course has been that of a half marathon|21.0975 km). The current course runs counter-clockwise around the Greifensee. The start and finish points are in Uster. Both the half marathon and 10 km run are officially measured. Apart from these two distances there are a variety of short distances - especially for children.

In 2009 the half marathon had 8985 finishers (6360 men and 2625 women), 1193 more than the year before. That same year, the 10 km race was completed by 1737 people (750 men and 987 women).

== Statistics ==
Total race finishers
Year	Half marathon (no. of women)	Other races (no. of women)
2021	2302 (716)	
2009	8985 (2625)	1737 (987)
2008	7792 (2251)	1507 (847)
2007	8434 (2506)	1335 (724)
2006	8159 (2534)	1105 (649)
2005	9080 (2839)	1169 (748)
2004	9476 (3124)	1163 (798)
2003	7131 (2168)	828 (532)
2002	6380 (1932)	915 (609)
2001	5552 (1569)	835 (550)
2000	5008 (1370)	854 (592)
1999	4793 (1302)	884 (585)
1998	5282 (1274)	919 (607)

Course records
Distance	Men's time	Men's holder	Men's year	Women's time	Women's holder	Women's year
Half marathon	1:01:40	Moses Tanui	1996	1:08:40	Joyce Chepchumba	2002
19.5 km	58:30 min	Gerhard Hartmann	1988	1:04:57	Grete Waitz	1986
19 km	56:51 min	Markus Ryffel	1984	1:02:52	Grete Waitz	1983
10.0 km	32:55	Adrian Marti	2007	38:14	Caroline Steffen	2008

== Past winners ==
=== 17.9 km ===
Year	Men's winner	Time (h:m:s)	Women's winner	Time (h:m:s)
18 September 2021	Ali Abdi Salam (SOM)	58:33	Andreina Schwarz (SUI)	1:10:15
19 September 2020	Ives Jan Moser (SUI)	1:02:00	Andreina Schwarz (SUI)	1:10:51

=== Half marathon ===
Year	Men's winner	Time (h:m:s)	Women's winner	Time (h:m:s)
21 September 2024	Dominic Lobalu (SUI)	1:04:31	Rebecca Chepkwemoi (KEN)	1:12:42
16 September 2023	Elvis Tabarach (KEN)	1:04:34	Lydia Korir (KEN)	1:17:57
17 September 2022	Elvis Tabarach (KEN)	1:03:45	Serkalem Mengiste (ETH)	1:15:08
21 September 2019	Muleta Meda (ETH)	1:05:22	Nicola Spirig (SUI)	1:16:30
22 September 2018	Tadesse Abraham (SUI)	1:03:37	Fabienne Schlumpf (SUI)	1:15:30
1 October 2017	Tadesse Abraham (SUI)	1:03.19,0	Laura Hrebec (SUI)	1:16.32,6
20 September 2016	Simon Tesfay (ERI)	1:03.43,9	Charity Kiprop (KEN)	1:15.59,2
19 September 2015	Patrick Ereng (KEN)	1:04.34,9	Patricia Morceli-Bühler (SUI)	1:15.29,5
20 September 2014	Tadesse Abraham (SUI)	1:04:33.4	Cynthia Kosgei (KEN)	1:15:29.2
21 September 2013	Tadesse Abraham (ERI)	1:02:36.7	Cynthia Kosgei (KEN)	1:13:22.4
22 September 2012	Jacob Kendagor (KEN)	1:01:14.5	Sabine Fischer (SUI)	1:13:18.2
17 September 2011	Tadesse Abraham (ERI)	1:04:00	Monica Chepkoech (KEN)	1:14:56
18 September 2010	Abraham Tando (KEN)	1:05:03.3	Eunice Kales (KEN)	1:13:18.2
19 September 2009	John Mwangangi (KEN)	1:05:42.1	Hellen Musyoka (KEN)	1:13:52.9
20 September 2008	John Mwangangi (KEN)	1:04:22.6	Hellen Musyoka (KEN)	1:13:56.9
22 September 2007	Nicholas Koech (KEN)	1:04:50.3	Hellen Musyoka (KEN)	1:14:52.2
16 September 2006	Nicholas Koech (KEN)	1:03:57.1	Emily Kimuria (KEN)	1:13:39.7
17 September 2005	Viktor Röthlin (SUI)	1:03:22.5	Joyce Chepchumba (KEN)	1:11:44.6
18 September 2004	Elijah Sang (KEN)	1:04:29.9	Tegla Loroupe (KEN)	1:10:04.4
20 September 2003	Elijah Sang (KEN)	1:05:03.7	Joyce Chepchumba (KEN)	1:14:16.5
21 September 2002	Mike Tanui (KEN)	1:04:25.1	Joyce Chepchumba (KEN)	1:08:39.1
22 September 2001	Christopher Kandie (KEN)	1:02:59.4	Judy Kiplimo (KEN)	1:09:45.3
16 September 2000	Sammy Kipruto (KEN)	1:03:55.4	Milkah Chepkieny (KEN)	1:12:25.3
18 September 1999	Patrick Sang (KEN)	1:03:31.6	Joyce Chepchumba (KEN)	1:10:15.2
27 September 1998	Sammy Kipruto (KEN)	1:02:34.4	Ester Barmasai (KEN)	1:14:06.7
20 September 1997	Joseph Mereng (KEN)	1:02:26	Lornah Kiplagat (KEN)	1:09:11
21 September 1996	Moses Tanui (KEN)	1:01:40	Daria Nauer (SUI)	1:12:30
16 September 1995	Wilson Omwoyo (KEN)	1:03:28	Franziska Rochat-Moser (SUI)	1:14:08
17 September 1994	Wilson Omwoyo (KEN)	1:01:53	Rosa Mota (POR)	1:11:11
18 September 1993	Petro Meta (TAN)	1:02:44	Alena Močáriová (SVK)	1:14:06
19 September 1992	Arturo Barrios (MEX)	1:03:09	Ursula Jeitziner (SUI)	1:12:59

=== 19.5 km ===
Year	Men's winner	Time (h:m:s)	Women's winner	Time (h:m:s)
21 September 1991	Diamantino dos Santos (BRA)	1:00:11	Rosa Mota (POR)	1:06:55
22 September 1990	Gidamis Shahanga (TAN)	58:49	Rosa Mota (POR)	1:07:00
16 September 1989	Gerhard Hartmann (AUT)	58:46	Rosa Mota (POR)	1:05:33
17 September 1988	Gerhard Hartmann (AUT)	58:30	Helen Comsa (SUI)	1:09:43
19 September 1987	Markus Ryffel (SUI)	59:04	Paula Fudge (GBR)	1:09:35
20 September 1986	Francesco Panetta (ITA)	58:46	Grete Waitz (NOR)	1:04:57

=== 19 km ===
Year	Men's winner	Time (h:m:s)	Women's winner	Time (h:m:s)
21 September 1985	Ibrahim Hussein (KEN)	58:19	Carla Beurskens (NED)	1:04:46
22 September 1984	Markus Ryffel (SUI)	56:51	Ellen Wessinghage (GER)	1:07:36
17 September 1983	Christoph Herle (GER)	56:58	Grete Waitz (NOR)	1:02:52
18 September 1982	Markus Ryffel (SUI)	57:31	Grete Waitz (NOR)	1:04:52
19 September 1981	Christoph Herle (GER)	57:33	Vreni Forster (SUI)	1:10:14
20 September 1980	Thomas Wessinghage (GER)	57:32	Cornelia Bürki (SUI)	25:18^{†}

- ^{†} The 1980 women's course distance was seven kilometres.
