= Yasuko Hashimoto =

Japanese long-distance runner

Yasuko Hashimoto (橋本 康子, Hashimoto Yasuko; born August 12, 1975) is a Japanese long-distance runner, whose main event is the marathon. She won the 2007 edition of the Nagoya Marathon, clocking 2:28:49. Her personal best (2:25:21) was set in 2005. Other wins in her career include the Berlin Marathon in 2003 and consecutive wins at the Kagawa Marugame Half Marathon in 2003 and 2004. She was born in Motomiya.

She represented her country in the marathon at the 2007 World Championships in Athletics.

== Achievements ==
- All results regarding marathon, unless stated otherwise

Year	Competition	Venue	Position	Notes
Representing Japan
2003	Berlin Marathon	Berlin, Germany	1st	2:26:32
2007	Nagoya Marathon	Nagoya, Japan	1st	2:28:49
