= Belgium at the 2023 World Athletics Championships =

- Flag of Belgium
- WA code: BEL

in Budapest, Hungary 19 August 2023 – 27 August 2023
- Competitors: 31 (18 men and 13 women)
- Medals: Gold 0 Silver 0 Bronze 0 Total 0

World Athletics Championships appearances (overview)
- 1983; 1987; 1991; 1993; 1995; 1997; 1999; 2001; 2003; 2005; 2007; 2009; 2011; 2013; 2015; 2017; 2019; 2022; 2023; 2025

Belgium competed at the 2023 World Athletics Championships in Budapest, Hungary, from 19 to 27 August 2023. For the first time in ten years, its athletes came home without a single medal.

== Results ==
Belgium entered 31 athletes.

Key

- Q = Qualified for the next round
- q = Qualified for the next round as a fastest loser or, in field events, by position without achieving the qualifying target
- NR = National record
- PB = Personal best
- SB = Season best
- N/A = Round not applicable for the event

=== Men ===
Track and road events

Athlete	Event	Heat		Semifinal		Final	
Athlete	Event	Result	Rank	Result	Rank	Result	Rank
Dylan Borlée	400 metres	45.24	4 q	45.59	7	Did not advance	
Alexander Doom	400 metres	44.92 PB	2 Q	45.57	5	Did not advance	
Ismael Debjani	1500 metres	3:47.02	15	Did not advance			
Ruben Verheyden	1500 metres	3:47.02	5 Q	3:33.96	11	Did not advance	
Jochem Vermeulen	1500 metres	3:35.45	9	Did not advance			
Robin Hendrix	5000 metres	13:55.81	19	—N/a		Did not advance	
John Heymans	5000 metres	13:39.67	13	—N/a		Did not advance	
Isaac Kimeli	10,000 metres	—N/a				28:20.77 SB	13
Julien Watrin	400 metres hurdles	48.72 SB	4 q	48.94	5	Did not advance	
Julien Watrin; Dylan Borlée; Robin Vanderbemden; Alexander Doom	4 × 400 metres relay	3:00.33 SB	5	—N/a		Did not advance	

Field events

Athlete	Event	Qualification		Final	
Athlete	Event	Distance	Position	Distance	Position
Thomas Carmoy	High jump	2.25	15	Did not advance	
Ben Broeders	Pole vault	5.75	11 q	5.75	7
Philip Milanov	Discus throw	63.00	18	Did not advance	
Timothy Herman	Javelin throw	80.11	11 q	74.56	12

=== Women ===
Track and road events

Athlete	Event	Heat		Semifinal		Final	
Athlete	Event	Result	Rank	Result	Rank	Result	Rank
Delphine Nkansa	100 metres	11.40	5	Did not advance			
Rani Rosius	100 metres	11.18 PB	4 q	11.20	7	Did not advance	
Cynthia Bolingo	400 metres	50.29 SB	2 Q	49.96 NR	3 q	50.33	5
Helena Ponette	400 metres	51.52 PB	6	Did not advance			
Elise Vanderelst	1500 metres	4:11.55	14	Did not advance			
Hanne Verbruggen	Marathon	—N/a				2:37:15	39
Hanne Claes	400 metres hurdles	55.13	3 Q	56.06	7	Did not advance	
Hanne Claes; Camille Laus^{1} Helena Ponette; Naomi Van Den Broeck^{2} Imke Vervaet	4 × 400 metres relay	3:23.63 SB	2 Q	—N/a		3:22.84 SB	5

^{1}Final only ^{2}Heats only

Field events

Athlete	Event	Qualification		Final	
Athlete	Event	Distance	Position	Distance	Position
Merel Maes	High jump	1.89	=17	Did not advance	
Elien Vekemans	Pole vault	4.35	29	Did not advance	

Combined events – Heptathlon

Athlete	Event	100H	HJ	SP	200 m	LJ	JT	800 m	Final	Rank
Noor Vidts	Result	13.33 SB	1.80	14.40	24.23	6.35	41.00	2:09.48	6450	6
Noor Vidts	Points	1075	978	821	959	959	686	972	6450	6

=== Mixed ===
Track events

Athlete	Event	Heat		Final	
Athlete	Event	Result	Rank	Result	Rank
Jonathan Borlée^{1} Camille Laus; Florent Mabille^{2} Robin Vanderbemden; Imke Vervaet	4 × 400 metres relay	3:11.81 SB	3 Q	3:13.83	5

^{1}Final only ^{2}Heats only
