= 2019 European Athletics U23 Championships – Women's 400 metres hurdles =

The women's 400 metres hurdles event at the 2019 European Athletics U23 Championships was held in Gävle, Sweden, at Gavlehov Stadium Park on 12, 13 and 14 July.

== Medalists ==
Gold	Silver	Bronze
Paulien Couckuyt; Belgium	Linda Olivieri; Italy	Yasmin Giger; Switzerland

== Result ==
=== Heats ===
Qualification: First 3 in each heat (Q) and next 4 fastest (q) qualified for the semifinals.

Rank	Heat	Name	Nationality	Time	Notes
1	1	Hanna Mikhailava	Belarus	58.24	Q, PB
2	2	Agata Zupin	Slovenia	58.30	Q
3	3	Lada Vondrová	Czech Republic	58.30	Q
4	3	Paulien Couckuyt	Belgium	58.38	Q
5	4	Linda Olivieri	Italy	58.48	Q
6	1	Yasmin Giger	Switzerland	58.50	Q
7	3	Rebecca Sartori	Italy	58.64	Q
8	2	Viivi Lehikoinen	Finland	58.85	Q
9	1	Aneja Simončič	Slovenia	58.94	Q
10	4	Natalia Wosztyl	Poland	59.07	Q
11	1	Iman Jean	France	59.17	q
12	4	Minna Svärd	Sweden	59.21	Q
13	2	Tereza Jonášová	Czech Republic	59.27	Q, SB
14	4	Iulia Nicoleta Banaga	Romania	59.32	q
15	4	Olibia-Nikoleta Karayianni	Greece	59.35	q
16	3	Nora Kollerød Wold	Norway	59.58	q
17	2	Oksana Aeschbacher	Switzerland	59.64	
18	1	Michaela Pešková	Slovakia	59.72	
19	2	Nina Brino	France	59.87	
20	4	Karin Disch	Switzerland	1:00.28	
21	3	Yekaterina Tyurina	Authorised Neutral Athletes	1:00.34	
22	3	Lucie Kudela	France	1:00.38	
23	1	Rebeka Tóth	Hungary	1:00.46	
24	2	Marie Skjæggestad	Norway	1:00.75	
25	1	Solveig Hernandez Vråle	Norway	1:00.90	
26	2	Amanda Holmberg	Sweden	1:01.37	
27	2	Inna Kovtun	Ukraine	1:01.39	
28	4	Michaela Bičianová	Czech Republic	1:01.61	
29	3	Tjaša Železnik	Slovenia	1:01.77	
30	3	Kamilė Gargasaitė	Lithuania	1:02.68	
	1	Vendela Rydbäck	Sweden	DQ	R168.7(a)

=== Semifinals ===
Qualification: First 3 in each heat (Q) and next 2 fastest (q) qualified for the final.

Rank	Heat	Name	Nationality	Time	Notes
1	2	Rebecca Sartori	Italy	56.89	Q, PB
2	2	Agata Zupin	Slovenia	57.27	Q
3	2	Yasmin Giger	Switzerland	57.29	Q
4	2	Lada Vondrová	Czech Republic	57.30	q
5	1	Linda Olivieri	Italy	57.40	Q
6	1	Paulien Couckuyt	Belgium	57.75	Q
7	2	Viivi Lehikoinen	Finland	58.02	q, SB
8	1	Natalia Wosztyl	Poland	58.44	Q
9	1	Aneja Simončič	Slovenia	58.94	
10	2	Iulia Nicoleta Banaga	Romania	59.10	SB
11	1	Nora Kollerød Wold	Norway	59.17	
12	2	Olibia-Nikoleta Karayianni	Greece	59.21	
13	2	Minna Svärd	Sweden	59.74	
14	1	Hanna Mikhailava	Belarus	59.86	
15	1	Tereza Jonášová	Czech Republic	59.92	
16	1	Iman Jean	France	1:00.37	

=== Final ===
Rank	Lane	Name	Nationality	Time	Notes
1st place, gold medalist(s)	5	Paulien Couckuyt	Belgium	56.17	PB
2nd place, silver medalist(s)	3	Linda Olivieri	Italy	56.22	
3rd place, bronze medalist(s)	8	Yasmin Giger	Switzerland	56.37	SB
4	4	Rebecca Sartori	Italy	56.93	
5	6	Agata Zupin	Slovenia	56.97	
6	2	Lada Vondrová	Czech Republic	57.29	
7	1	Viivi Lehikoinen	Finland	58.24	
8	7	Natalia Wosztyl	Poland	59.69	
