= Brussels Marathon =

Annual race in Belgium held since 1984

- Date: Late October or early November
- Location: Brussels Capital Region and Tervuren, Belgium
- Distance: Marathon, half marathon
- Primary sponsor: Brussels Airport
- Established: 1984 (42 years ago); 2004 (22 years ago) (current era)
- Course records: Men's: 2:11:00 (2004) (Kenya) John Kelai; Women's: 2:32:16 (2004) (Kenya) Jennifer Chesinon
- Website: Brussels Airport Marathon
- Participants: 6,276 (2019)

The Brussels Marathon is an annual AIMS-certified marathon held in Brussels, Belgium, first held in 1984, and usually held in the autumn. Races of shorter distances are also held on the same day.

== History ==
The full race was first held in 1984.

The race was not held from 1995 to 2003.

In 2004, the race was restarted as part of the ING Running Tour, organized by ING Belgium and the Royal Belgian Athletics League.

Public controversy arose in social networks in 2017, where podium awards appeared and differed significantly between females and males. Following a change of sponsorship by Brussels Airport in 2018, the organisers (Golazo Sports) announced that awards would be aligned equally for both sexes. In 2018, the organisers defended the non-publication of full race results including category positions on the grounds of recent changes in European privacy laws, although inconsistent with standard practice as well as the publication of other race results by the same organiser.

The 2020 edition of the race was postponed to 3 October 2021 due to the COVID-19 pandemic in Belgium, with all entries automatically remaining valid for 2021.

In November 2025, the City of Brussels announced that the marathon would no longer pass through the capital from 2026 onwards, citing financial and logistical pressures on municipal resources.

== Course ==
External image
- Course map of full marathon in 2018

The marathon makes a loop, starting and ending in the City of Brussels, in the proximity of Brussels Park. Initially the runners head eastwards, to Tervuren. Alongside the track, the participants pass several green areas: the Cinquantenaire Park, the Woluwe Park, the Capuchin Forest, the Royal Belgian Golf Club and the Bois de la Cambre. Since 2017, the course has started and finished in the Cinquantenaire Park, initially heading west anti-clockwise around the city, with the full marathon deviating out-and-back to Tervuren. Since 2018, the start and finish has coincided with the more renowned 20 km of Brussels held in May.

=== Additional distances ===
A half marathon, a Mini Marathon (6.5 km) and a Kids Run (1 km) are also held.

== Qualification ==
The full Brussels Marathon is open to runners 18 or older from any nation. Competitors for the half marathon have to be at least 16 years of age.

== Attendance ==
More people participate in the half marathon than in the full marathon. As of 2014, the half marathon had its largest attendance in 2012 with 8006 participants, and the full Brussels Marathon had its largest attendance in 2010 with 2546 runners. As of 2025, total event participation reached around 20,000 across the marathon, half marathon and 7 km, surpassing the previous record of 18,500 set in 2024.

== Environmental impact ==
In response to increasing public concerns on the amount of unnecessary waste at such public sports events, the organisers are aiming at a plastic-free event from 2019 onwards, with drinking water served in cardboard cups, no goody bags and avoiding the need for aluminium foil protection after the race by ensuring participants' sports bags are readily accessible.

== Winners ==
Key: Course record (in bold)

=== Marathon ===
==== Initial era ====
Date	Race name	Male Winner	Time	Female Winner	Time	Finishers	Rf.
1984.09.30	Brussels	Dirk Vanderherten (BEL)	2:18:46	Mia Pauwels (BEL)	2:44:43	1815	
1985.09.29	Brussels	Dirk Vanderherten (BEL)	2:18:36	Agnes Pardaens (BEL)	2:46:37	1441	
1986.09.28	Brussels	Dirk Vanderherten (BEL)	2:15:32	Francine Peeters (BEL)	2:42:02		
1987.09.27	Brussels	Rudi Dirickx (BEL)	2:18:05	Nelly Aerts (BEL)	2:33:33	1439	
1988.09.11	Brussels	Vesa Kähkölä (FIN)	2:16:53	Francine Peeters (BEL)	2:44:12	1161	
1989.09.24	Brussels	Pavel Klimeš (TCH)	2:16:46	Nelly Aerts (BEL)	2:36:49	1271	
1990.09.30	Spa Brussels	Csaba Szűcs (HUN)	2:17:36	Valentina Lunyegova (URS)	2:40:00		
1991.09.15	Brussels	Anatoly Karipanov (URS)	2:18:04	Irina Sklyarenko (URS)	2:41:32		
1992.09.13	Brussels	Anatoly Karipanov (RUS)	2:16:43	Mária Starovská (TCH)	2:42:13		
1993.09.12	Brussels	Ronny Ligneel (BEL)	2:16:14	Véronique Collard (BEL)	2:44:29		
1994.09.18	Reebok Brussels	Vincent Rousseau (BEL)	2:12:59	Karin Bøgh Andersen (DEN)	3:03:02		

==== Current era ====
Ed.	Date	Race name	Male Winner	Time	Female Winner	Time	Finishers	Rf.
1	2004.10.10	ING Brussels	John Kelai (KEN)	**2:11:00**	Jennifer Chesinon (KEN)	**2:32:16**	1801	
2	2005.08.28	ING Brussels	Samson Kosgei (KEN)	2:12:01	Rose Nyangancha (KEN)	2:37:48	784	
3	2006.08.27	ING Brussels	Stephen Loruo (KEN)	2:11:26	Irene Mogaka (KEN)	2:42:53	819	
4	2007.10.14	ING Brussels	Jonathan Kiptoo (KEN)	2:12:16	Rael Jepyator (KEN)	2:41:20	1476	
5	2008.10.05	Brussels	Rik Ceulemans (BEL)	2:19:29	Anne Zijderveld (NED)	3:15:51	1149	
6	2009.10.04	Brussels	Abraham Potongole (KEN)	2:15:13	Virginie Soenen (BEL)	3:07:12	1569	
7	2010.10.10	Brussels	Levy Matebo (KEN)	2:13:30	Mariska Dute (BEL)	2:59:16	1998	
8	2011.10.02	Brussels	Paul Kiprop (KEN)	2:14:51	Mariska Dute (BEL)	3:00:01	1553	
9	2012.10.07	Brussels	Joseph Mutai (KEN)	2:16:41	Claire Macht (DEN)	3:06:15	1709	
10	2013.10.06	Brussels	Samson Bungei (KEN)	2:15:49	Maja Glesti (SWI)	3:10:21	1794	
11	2014.10.05	Belfius Brussels	Florent Caelen (BEL)	2:16:31	Louise Deldicque (BEL)	2:56:26	1885	
12	2015.10.04	Belfius Brussels	Geoffrey Kipkoech (KEN)	2:14:39	Soetkin Demey (BEL)	3:05:31	2011	
13	2016.10.02	Belfius Brussels	Eric Kering (KEN)	2:16:51	Virginie Vandroogenbroeck (BEL)	2:53:42	1427	
14	2017.10.01	Belfius Brussels	Stephen Kiplagat (KEN)	2:11:44	Christelle Lemaire (BEL)	3:10:42	1437	
15	2018.10.28	Brussels Airport	Laban Cheruiyot (KEN)	2:24:20	Kabiratou Nassam (BEL)	2:57:59	1608	
16	2019.10.06	Brussels Airport	Michael Chege (KEN)	2:17:53	Kabiratou Nassam (BEL)	2:54:48	1343	
	2020	postponed due to coronavirus pandemic						-
	2021	postponed due to coronavirus pandemic						-
17	2022.10.02	Brussels Airport	Dominic Mibei (KEN)	2:14:13	Veerle Dhaese (BEL)	3:10:16	1080	
18	2023.10.01	Brussels Airport	Simon Kipkosgei (KEN)	2:15:31	Christa Cain (GBR)	2:50:50	1381	

=== Half marathon ===
Ed.	Date	Men's winner	Time	Women's winner	Time	Rf.
1	2005.08.28	Guy Fays (BEL)	**1:06:45**	Claudia Stalder (BEL)	1:23:42	
2	2006.08.27	Guy Fays (BEL)	1:07:16	Catherine Lallemand (BEL)	1:18:53	
3	2007.10.14	Jason Mayeroff (USA)	1:07:03	Anne-Marie Dupont (BEL)	1:28:08	
4	2008.10.05	Guy Fays (BEL)	1:08:41	Blanka Paulů (CZE)	1:26:25	
5	2009.10.04	Guy Fays (BEL)	1:12:16	Catherine Lallemand (BEL)	1:20:49	
6	2010.10.10	Abdeljebbar Sihammane (MAR)	1:09:24	Ysabelle Vuillard (BEL)	1:22:36	
7	2011.10.02	Alexander Rodríguez (BEL)	1:08:36	Claire Nuytens (BEL)	1:27:42	
8	2012.10.07	Abdeljebbar Sihammane (MAR)	1:09:49	Hasna Bahom (MAR)	1:19:05	
9	2013.10.06	Abdeljebbar Sihammane (MAR)	1:09:50	Petra Fašungová (SVK)	1:22:39	
10	2014.10.05	Lander Van Droogenbroeck (BEL)	1:08:35	Alexandra Tondeur (BEL)	1:21:57	
11	2015.10.04	Lander Van Droogenbroeck (BEL)	1:09:04	Nina Lauwaert (BEL)	1:23:53	
12	2016.10.02	Lander Van Droogenbroeck (BEL)	1:08:57	Kabiratou Nassam Alassani (BEN)	1:20:27	
13	2017.10.01	Josh Bull (GBR)	1:08:07	Sophie Hardy (BEL)	**1:18:47**	
14	2018.10.28	Maxime Delvoie (BEL)	1:09:58	Charlotte Monfils (BEL)	1:23:58	
15	2019.10.06	Nick Earl (GBR)	1:07:16	Sonja Vernikov (GER)	1:20:52	
	2020	postponed due to coronavirus pandemic				
	2021	postponed due to coronavirus pandemic				
16	2022.10.02	Nicolas Fiessinger (FRA)	1:07:33	Inès Martin (BEL)	1:26:46	
17	2023.10.01	Lukas Outtier (BEL)	1:11:12	Mathilde Deswaef (BEL)	1:20:56	

== See also ==
- List of marathon races in Europe
- 20 km of Brussels
