= Belgium at the World Athletics Championships =

- WA code: BEL
- National federation: Royal Belgian Athletics League
- Website: www.belgian-athletics.be
- Medals Ranked 55th: Gold 2 Silver 2 Bronze 7 Total 11

World Athletics Championships appearances (overview)
- 1983; 1987; 1991; 1993; 1995; 1997; 1999; 2001; 2003; 2005; 2007; 2009; 2011; 2013; 2015; 2017; 2019; 2022; 2023; 2025

Belgium has competed in all World Athletics Championships since 1983.

Athletes representing Belgium have won 11 medals of which 2 gold. Belgium's only gold medalist is heptathlete Nafissatou Thiam who won in London 2017 and Eugene 2022. Belgium was most successful at the 2022 World Championships, where the Belgium athletes won the most medals (3) and where the country had the highest medal ranking (=16th).

== Medal table ==
| Championships | Men | | | Women | | | Mixed | | | Total | | | | | |
| Championships | Gold | Silver | Bronze | Gold | Silver | Bronze | Gold | Silver | Bronze | Gold | Silver | Bronze | Total | Rank | Athletes |
|---|---|---|---|---|---|---|---|---|---|---|---|---|---|---|---|
| 1976 Malmö | 0 | 0 | 0 | No female events | | | No mixed events | | | 0 | 0 | 0 | 0 | Unranked | |
| 1980 Sittard | No male events | | | 0 | 0 | 0 | No mixed events | | | 0 | 0 | 0 | 0 | Unranked | |
| 1983 Helsinki | 0 | 0 | 0 | 0 | 0 | 0 | No mixed events | | | 0 | 0 | 0 | 0 | Unranked | |
| 1987 Roma | 0 | 0 | 1 | 0 | 0 | 0 | No mixed events | | | 0 | 0 | 1 | 1 | =25 | |
| 1991 Tokyo | 0 | 0 | 0 | 0 | 0 | 0 | No mixed events | | | 0 | 0 | 0 | 0 | Unranked | |
| 1993 Stuttgart | 0 | 0 | 0 | 0 | 0 | 0 | No mixed events | | | 0 | 0 | 0 | 0 | Unranked | |
| 1995 Gothenburg | 0 | 0 | 0 | 0 | 0 | 0 | No mixed events | | | 0 | 0 | 0 | 0 | Unranked | |
| 1997 Athens | 0 | 0 | 0 | 0 | 0 | 0 | No mixed events | | | 0 | 0 | 0 | 0 | Unranked | |
| 1999 Seville | 0 | 0 | 1 | 0 | 0 | 0 | No mixed events | | | 0 | 0 | 1 | 1 | =34 | |
| 2001 Edmonton | 0 | 0 | 0 | 0 | 0 | 0 | No mixed events | | | 0 | 0 | 0 | 0 | Unranked | |
| 2003 Paris | 0 | 0 | 0 | 0 | 0 | 0 | No mixed events | | | 0 | 0 | 0 | 0 | Unranked | |
| 2005 Helsinki | 0 | 0 | 0 | 0 | 0 | 0 | No mixed events | | | 0 | 0 | 0 | 0 | Unranked | |
| 2007 Osaka | 0 | 0 | 0 | 0 | 0 | 1 | No mixed events | | | 0 | 0 | 1 | 1 | =36 | |
| 2009 Berlin | 0 | 0 | 0 | 0 | 0 | 0 | No mixed events | | | 0 | 0 | 0 | 0 | Unranked | 23 |
| 2011 Daegu | 0 | 0 | 1 | 0 | 0 | 0 | No mixed events | | | 0 | 0 | 1 | 1 | =34 | 11 |
| 2013 Moscow | 0 | 0 | 0 | 0 | 0 | 0 | No mixed events | | | 0 | 0 | 0 | 0 | Unranked | 17 |
| 2015 Beijing | 0 | 1 | 0 | 0 | 0 | 0 | No mixed events | | | 0 | 1 | 0 | 1 | =25 | 19 |
| 2017 London | 0 | 0 | 0 | 1 | 0 | 0 | No mixed events | | | 1 | 0 | 0 | 1 | =23 | 17 |
| 2019 Doha | 0 | 0 | 1 | 0 | 1 | 0 | 0 | 0 | 0 | 0 | 1 | 1 | 2 | =24 | 29 |
| 2022 Eugene | 0 | 0 | 2 | 1 | 0 | 0 | 0 | 0 | 0 | 1 | 0 | 2 | 3 | =16 | 32 |
| 2023 Budapest | 0 | 0 | 0 | 0 | 0 | 0 | 0 | 0 | 0 | 0 | 0 | 0 | 0 | Unranked | 32 |
| 2025 Tokyo | 0 | 1 | 0 | 0 | 0 | 0 | 0 | 0 | 1 | 0 | 1 | 0 | 2 | =25 | 47 |
| 2027 Beijing | To be determined | | | | | | | | | | | | | | |
| 2029 Nairobi | To be determined | | | | | | | | | | | | | | |
| 2031 Munich | To be determined | | | | | | | | | | | | | | |
| Total | 0 | 2 | 6 | 2 | 1 | 1 | 0 | 0 | 1 | 2 | 3 | 8 | 13 | 56 | |

== Multiple medalists ==
| Athlete | Gold | Silver | Bronze | Total | Years |
|---|---|---|---|---|---|
| Nafissatou Thiam | 2 | 1 | 0 | 3 | 2017–2022 |
| Kevin Borlée | 0 | 0 | 3 | 3 | 2011–2022 |
| Dylan Borlée | 0 | 0 | 3 | 3 | 2019–2025 |
| Jonathan Sacoor | 0 | 0 | 3 | 3 | 2019–2025 |
| Julien Watrin | 0 | 0 | 2 | 2 | 2019–2022 |
