= Wilson Omwoyo =

Kenyan long-distance runner (born 1965)

Wilson Omwoyo (born 25 November 1965) is a retired Kenyan long-distance runner. He competed for his country at the 1994 IAAF World Cross Country Championships, where he finished 17th overall.

Although he did not have success internationally with Kenya, he won numerous competitions on the European circuit during his career. In cross country running, he won the 1990 Cross Internacional Valle de Llodio and in 1992 topped the podium at the Cross de l'Acier and Cross Memorial Juan Muguerza races. Other victories included the Cross du Figaro in Paris in 1993 and the Tilburg Warandeloop in 1995.

In addition to his cross country running, he won top level road running competitions as well. He won the Foulée Suresnoise twice consecutively in 1993/1994. At the Greifenseelauf half marathon in Uster he set a course record of 1:01:53 hours in 1994 and returned the following year to win for a second time. He was also a two-time winner at the Grand Prix von Bern (taking titles in 1994 and 1996). In the same year as his second victory in Bern, he won the 20 km of Brussels race with a course best time of 55:41 minutes.

He continued running after peaking in his thirties, but competed at smaller races. He won the Swansea Bay 10K in Wales in 1998. In 2007 he was still running and set an all-comers record for the territory of Guadeloupe, winning a half marathon in Abymes in a time of 1:08:04 hours.
