= Linda Olivieri =

Italian hurdler

Personal information
- National team: Italy (2 caps)
- Born: 14 July 1998 (age 28) Turin, Italy
- Height: 1.73 m (5 ft 8 in)
- Weight: 58 kg (128 lb)

Sport
- Sport: Athletics
- Event: 400 m hs
- Club: Fiamme Oro Padova; Atletica Monza
- Coached by: Giorgio Ripamonti

Achievements and titles
- Personal best: 400 m hs: 55.63 (2021)
Medal record
European Team Championships
Bronze medal – third place	2021 Silesia	400 m hs
Youth level
Event / 1st / 2nd / 3rd; European U23 Championships / 0 / 1 / 0

Linda Olivieri (born 14 July 1998) is an Italian hurdler who competed at the 2019 World Athletics Championships. She competed at the 2020 Summer Olympics, in 400 m hurdles.

== Biography ==
With the standard to participate in the 2019 World Championships in the 400 meters hurdles, set by the IAAF in 56.00, before the start of the championships she reached the 47th in the World Rankings.

== Personal best ==
- 400 metres hurdles: 54.99 - (Italy) Rome, 10 June 2024

== Achievements ==
Year	Competition	Venue	Position	Event	Time	Notes
2019	European U23 Championships	(Sweden) Gävle	2nd	400 m hs	56.22	
2019	World Championships	(Qatar) Doha	Heat (28th)	400 m hs	56.82	

== See also ==
- Italian all-time top lists - 400 metres hurdles
