= 2003 Berlin Marathon =

Road running event in Berlin, Germany

30th Berlin Marathon
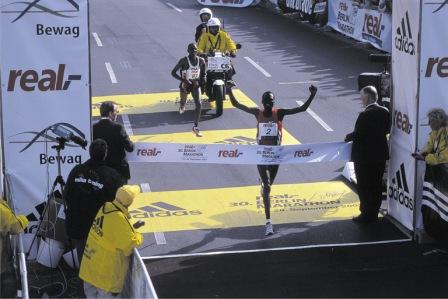
- Paul Tergat crossing the finish line
- Venue: Berlin, Germany
- Dates: 28 September 2003

Champions
- Men: Paul Tergat (2:04:55)
- Women: Yasuko Hashimoto (2:26:32)

The 2003 Berlin Marathon was the 30th running of the annual marathon race held in Berlin, Germany, held on 28 September 2003. Kenya's Paul Tergat won the men's race in 2:04:55 hours, while the women's race was won by Japan's Yasuko Hashimoto in 2:26:32. Tergat broke the men's marathon world record by a margin of 43 seconds, making him the first man to complete the distance under two hours and five minutes.

== Results ==
=== Men ===
Position	Athlete	Nationality	Time
1	Paul Tergat	Kenya	2:04:55 WR
2	Sammy Korir	Kenya	2:04:56
3	Titus Munji	Kenya	2:06:15
4	Andrés Espinosa	Mexico	2:08:46
5	Raymond Kipkoech	Kenya	2:09:22
6	Kazuhiro Matsuda	Japan	2:09:50
7	Kurao Umeki	Japan	2:09:52
8	André Luiz Ramos	Brazil	2:09:59
9	Makhosonke Fika	South Africa	2:10:16
10	Francisco Caballero	Spain	2:10:44

=== Women ===
Position	Athlete	Nationality	Time
1	Yasuko Hashimoto	Japan	2:26:32
2	Emily Chepar Kimuria	Kenya	2:28:18
3	Ornella Ferrara	Italy	2:28:28
4	Ana Dias	Portugal	2:28:49
5	Alina Ivanova	Russia	2:29:00
6	Monika Stefanowicz	Poland	2:29:58
7	Fumi Murata	Japan	2:30:15
8	Liz Yelling	United Kingdom	2:30:58
9	Adelia Elias	Portugal	2:34:07
10	Dagmar Rabensteiner	Austria	2:34:35
