= Belgium at the 2009 World Championships in Athletics =

- WA code: BEL
- National federation: Ligue Royale Belge d'Athlétisme
- Website: www.faisdelathle.be

in Berlin
- Competitors: 23
- Medals: Gold 0 Silver 0 Bronze 0 Total 0

World Championships in Athletics appearances
- 1983; 1987; 1991; 1993; 1995; 1997; 1999; 2001; 2003; 2005; 2007; 2009; 2011; 2013; 2015; 2017; 2019; 2022; 2023; 2025

Belgium competed at the 2009 World Championships in Athletics from 15–23 August. A team of 23 athletes was announced in preparation for the competition. Selected athletes have achieved one of the competition's qualifying standards. The team features a women's 4 x 100 metres relay, which won medals at the 2007 World Championships, and the 2008 Beijing Olympics.

== Team selection ==
Track and road events

Event	Athletes	
Event	Men	Women
200 metres		Olivia Borlée
400 metres	Kevin Borlée; Cédric Van Branteghem	
1500 metres	Kristof Van Malderen	
100 metres hurdles	—	Eline Berings; Elisabeth Davin
110 metres hurdles	Adrien Deghelt; Damien Broothaerts	—
400 metres hurdles	Michael Bultheel	Élodie Ouédraogo
3000 m steeplechase	Pieter Desmet; Krijn Van Koolwijk	
4×100 metres relay		Olivia Borlée; Anne Zagré; Hanna Mariën; Élodie Ouédraogo; Elisabeth Davin; Eline Berings
4×400 metres relay	Kevin Borlée; Cedric Van Branteghem; Antoine Gillet; Nils Duerinck; Arnaud Ghislain; Joris Haeck	

Field and combined events

Event	Athletes	
Event	Men	Women
Pole vault	Kevin Rans	
Triple jump		Svetlana Bolshakova
Javelin throw	Tom Goyvaerts; Thomas Smet	
Heptathlon	—	Sara Aerts

== Results ==
=== Men ===
Track and road events

Event	Athletes	Heat Round 1		Heat Round 2		Semifinal		Final	
Event	Athletes	Result	Rank	Result	Rank	Result	Rank	Result	Rank
400 m	Kevin Borlée	45.61	20 Q	-		45.28 SB	12	did not advance	
400 m	Cédric Van Branteghem	45.94	27	did not advance					
1500 m	Kristof Van Malderen	3:46.03	39	did not advance					
110 m hurdles	Adrien Deghelt	13.78	34	did not advance					
110 m hurdles	Damien Broothaerts	14.15	42	did not advance					
400 m hurdles	Michael Bultheel	49.67 PB	19	did not advance					
3000 m steeplechase	Pieter Desmet	8:31.81	23	did not advance					
3000 m steeplechase	Krijn Van Koolwijk	8:24.22 SB	16	did not advance					
4 × 400 m relay	Kevin Borlée; Cedric Van Branteghem; Antoine Gillet; Nils Duerinck; Arnaud Ghislain; Joris Haeck	3:02.13	5 Q	-				3:01.88 SB	4

Field events

Event	Athletes	Qualification		Final	
Event	Athletes	Result	Rank	Result	Rank
Pole vault	Kevin Rans	5.55	12 q	5.50	12
Javelin throw	Tom Goyvaerts	77.37	23	did not advance	
Javelin throw	Thomas Smet	70.35	39	did not advance	

=== Women ===
Track and road events

Event	Athletes	Heat Round 1		Heat Round 2		Semifinal		Final	
Event	Athletes	Result	Rank	Result	Rank	Result	Rank	Result	Rank
200 m	Olivia Borlée	23.25	17 Q	-		23.42	22	did not advance	
100 m hurdles	Eline Berings	13.04	18 q	-		12.94 NR	14	did not advance	
100 m hurdles	Elisabeth Davin	DNF		did not advance					
400 m hurdles	Élodie Ouédraogo	56.60 SB	22 q	-		57.58	23	did not advance	
4 × 100 m relay	Olivia Borlée; Anne Zagré; Hanna Mariën; Élodie Ouédraogo; Elisabeth Davin; Eline Berings	43.99 SB	12					did not advance	

Field and combined events

Event	Athletes	Qualification		Final	
Event	Athletes	Result	Rank	Result	Rank
Triple jump	Svetlana Bolshakova	13.89	20	did not advance	
Heptathlon	Sara Aerts	DNF			
