= Emily Kimuria =

Kenyan long-distance runner

Personal information
- Full name: Emily Chepar Kimuria
- Born: 10 June 1975 (age 51) Kenya

Sport
- Sport: Athletics
Medal record
Marathon
Representing Kenya
World Marathon Majors
Silver medal – second place	2003 Berlin	Marathon

Emily Chepar Kimuria (born 10 June 1975) is a Kenyan long-distance runner, who came second at the 2003 Berlin Marathon. She won the 2004 Hamburg Marathon and the 2005 Venice Marathon.

== Career ==
Kimuria came second at the 2003 Berlin Marathon, in a time of 2:28:18. In 2004, Kimuria won the Hamburg Marathon in a time of 2:28:57. She won the race by one second from fellow Kenyan Alice Chelangat. It was her first marathon win. In the same year, she came second at the Amsterdam Marathon in a time of 2:29:45. In 2005, she won the Venice Marathon, after breaking away from Ethiopian Leila Aman after 30 kilometres (19 mi).

In 2006, Kimuria came third at the Singapore Marathon, and won the Greifenseelauf road race in Switzerland. In 2008, she came second at the Prague Marathon, in a time of 2:35:55. In 2009, Kimuria came third at the Amsterdam Marathon.
