= Belgium at the 2011 World Championships in Athletics =

- WA code: BEL
- National federation: Ligue Royale Belge d'Athlétisme
- Website: www.val.be

in Daegu
- Competitors: 9
- Medals: Gold 0 Silver 0 Bronze 1 Total 1

World Championships in Athletics appearances
- 1983; 1987; 1991; 1993; 1995; 1997; 1999; 2001; 2003; 2005; 2007; 2009; 2011; 2013; 2015; 2017; 2019; 2022; 2023

Belgium competed at the 2011 World Championships in Athletics from August 27 to September 4 in Daegu, South Korea.

== Team selection ==
A team of 11 athletes was announced to represent the country in the event.

The following athletes appeared on the preliminary Entry List, but not on the Official Start List of the specific event, resulting in total number of 9 competitors:

KEY:	Did not participate	Competed in another event

	Event	Athlete
Men	4 x 400 metres relay	Arnaud Destatte
Men	4 x 400 metres relay	Joris Haeck

== Medalists ==
The following Belgian competitor won a medal at the Championships

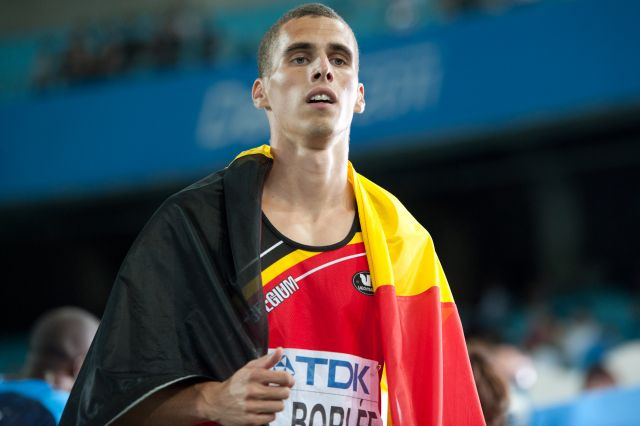
Kevin Borlée won a bronze medal in the Men's 400 metres competition at this year's championships

Medal	Athlete	Event
Bronze	Kevin Borlée	400 metres

== Results ==
=== Men ===
Athlete	Event	Preliminaries		Heats		Semifinals		Final	
Athlete	Event	Time Width Height	Rank	Time Width Height	Rank	Time Width Height	Rank	Time Width Height	Rank
Kevin Borlée	400 metres			44.77	2 Q	45.02	3 Q	44.90	3rd place, bronze medalist(s)
Jonathan Borlée	400 metres			45.16	7 Q	45.14	4 Q	45.07	5
Jeroen D'hoedt	1500 metres			3:45.54	31	Did not advance			
Jonathan Borlée; Antoine Gillet; Nils Duerinck; Kevin Borlée	4 x 400 metres relay			3:00.71 SB	6 Q			3:00.41 SB	5

Decathlon

Thomas Van Der Plaetsen	Decathlon			
Thomas Van Der Plaetsen	Event	Results	Points	Rank
	100 m	11.20 PB	817	23
	Long jump	7.79 PB	1007	1
	Shot put	12.76	653	28
	High jump	2.17 PB	963	1
	400 m	49.46	840	11
	110 m hurdles	14.79	875	19
	Discus throw	37.20	608	25
	Pole vault	5.10	941	2
	Javelin throw	58.91	721	13
	1500 m	4:45.86	644	15
Total			8069	13

=== Women ===
Athlete	Event	Preliminaries		Heats		Semifinals		Final	
Athlete	Event	Time Width Height	Rank	Time Width Height	Rank	Time Width Height	Rank	Time Width Height	Rank
Anne Zagré	100 m hurdles			13.47	32	Not advance			
Élodie Ouédraogo	400 m hurdles			55.40 PB	10 Q	55.29 PB	11	Not advance	

Heptathlon

Sara Aerts	Heptathlon			
Sara Aerts	Event	Results	Points	Rank
	100 m hurdles	13.38 SB	1068	8
	High jump	1.74 SB	903	22
	Shot put	12.49	694	20
	200 m	DNS		
	Long jump	DNS		
	Javelin throw	DNS		
	800 m	DNS		
Total			DNF	
