= Dirk Vanderherten =

Belgian long-distance runner

Personal information
- Nationality: Belgian
- Born: 9 March 1957 (age 69) Uccle, Belgium

Sport
- Sport: Long-distance running
- Event: Marathon

Dirk Vanderherten (born 9 March 1957) is a Belgian long-distance runner who competed in the men's marathon at the 1988 Summer Olympics.
