= Belgium at the 2013 World Championships in Athletics =

- WA code: BEL
- National federation: Ligue Royale Belge d'Athlétisme
- Website: www.val.be

in Moscow
- Competitors: 17
- Medals: Gold 0 Silver 0 Bronze 0 Total 0

World Championships in Athletics appearances
- 1983; 1987; 1991; 1993; 1995; 1997; 1999; 2001; 2003; 2005; 2007; 2009; 2011; 2013; 2015; 2017; 2019; 2022; 2023

Belgium competed at the 2013 World Championships in Athletics in Moscow, Russia, from 10 to 18 August 2013. A team of 17 athletes was announced to represent the country in the event.

== Results ==
(q – qualified, NM – no mark, PB – personal best, SB – season best)

=== Men ===
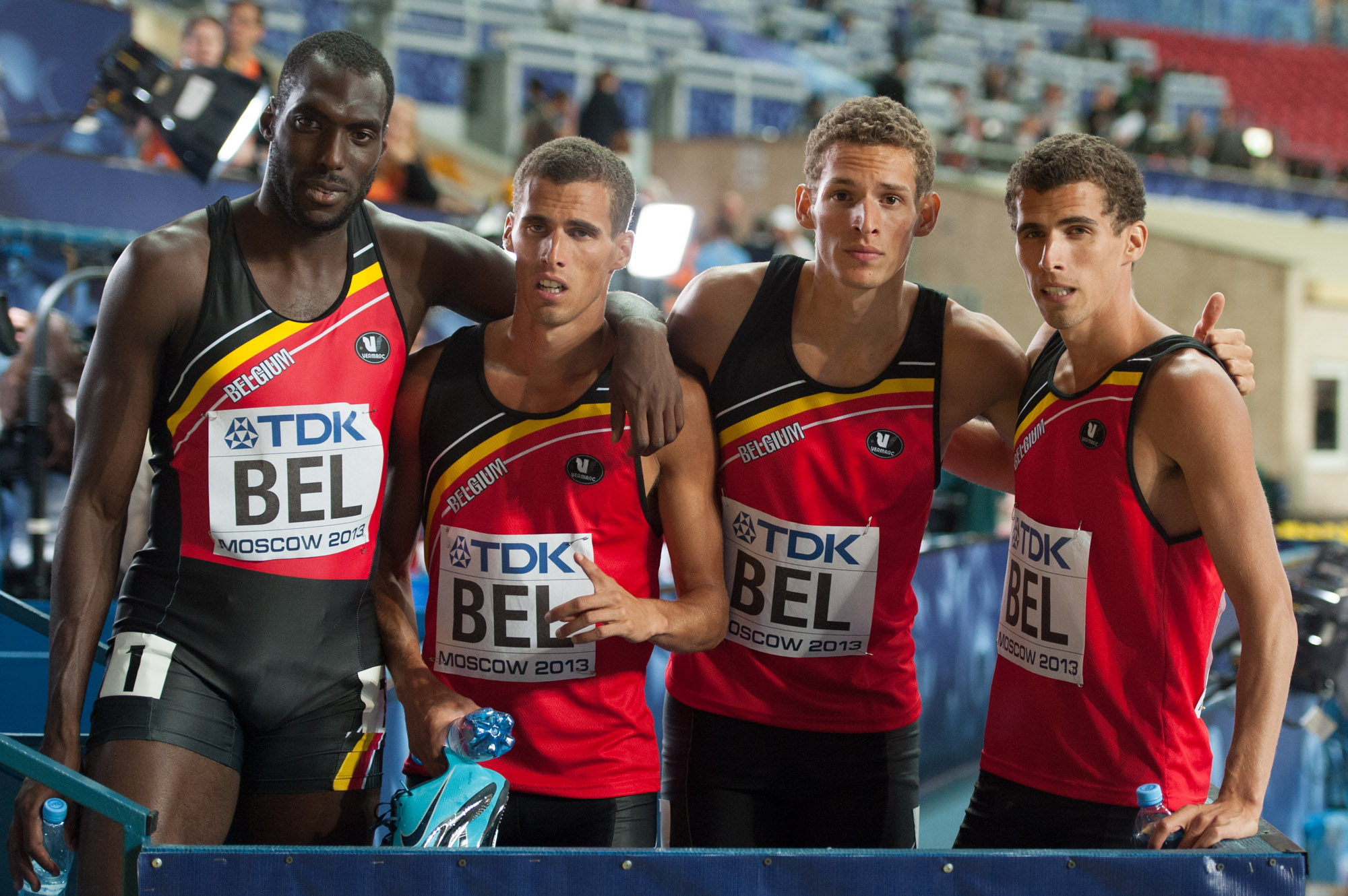
Belgium 4 × 400 m relay team

Track and road events

Athlete	Event	Preliminaries		Heats		Semifinals		Final	
Athlete	Event	Time	Rank	Time	Rank	Time	Rank	Time	Rank
Jonathan Borlée	400 metres			45.24	9 Q	44.85	7 Q	44.54 SB	4
Kevin Borlée	400 metres			45.32	10 Q	45.03	9	did not advance	
Pieter-Jan Hannes	1500 metres			3:40.39	25	did not advance			
Bashir Abdi	10,000 metres							21:48.69	23
Adrien Deghelt	110 metres hurdles								
Antoine Gillet; Jonathan Borlée; Dylan Borlée; Kevin Borlée; Arnaud Destatte; Will Oyowe	4 × 400 metres relay			3:00.81 SB	5 q			3:01.02	5

Decathlon

Thomas van der Plaetsen	Decathlon			
Thomas van der Plaetsen	Event	Results	Points	Rank
	100 m	11.09 PB	841	19
	Long jump	7.64	970	5
	Shot put	13.57 PB	702	26
	High jump	2.05	850	6
	400 m	49.00 SB	861	16
	110 m hurdles	14.66 SB	891	18
	Discus throw	41.17	688	23
	Pole vault	5.10	941	6
	Javelin throw	65.31 PB	818	9
	1500 m	4:37.93 SB	693	20
Total			8255 PB	15
Hans Van Alphen	Decathlon			
Hans Van Alphen	Event	Results	Points	Rank
	100 m			
	Long jump			
	Shot put			
	High jump			
	400 m			
	110 m hurdles			
	Discus throw			
	Pole vault			
	Javelin throw			
	1500 m			
Total				

Track and road events

Athlete	Event	Preliminaries		Heats		Semifinals		Final	
Athlete	Event	Time	Rank	Time	Rank	Time	Rank	Time	Rank
Almensh Belete	5000 metres			16:03.03	16	did not advance			
Sara Aerts	100 metres hurdles			DNS		did not advance			
Anne Zagré	100 metres hurdles			16:03.03	16				
Axelle Dauwens	400 metres hurdles			56.85	21	did not advance			

Field events

Athlete	Event	Preliminaries		Final	
Athlete	Event	Width Height	Rank	Width Height	Rank
Tia Hellebaut	Long jump	6.47	20		

Heptathlon

Nafissatou Thiam	Heptathlon			
Nafissatou Thiam	Event	Results	Points	Rank
	100 m hurdles	14.13	960	28
	High jump	1.92 PB	1132	1
	Shot put	13.71	775	12
	200 m	25.61	832	26
	Long jump	6.11	883	13
	Javelin throw	43.64	737	15
	800 m	2:25.43	751	29
Total			6070	14

== See also ==
Belgium at other World Championships in 2013

- Belgium at the 2013 UCI Road World Championships
- Belgium at the 2013 World Aquatics Championships
