= Manuela Soccol =

Belgian long-distance runner

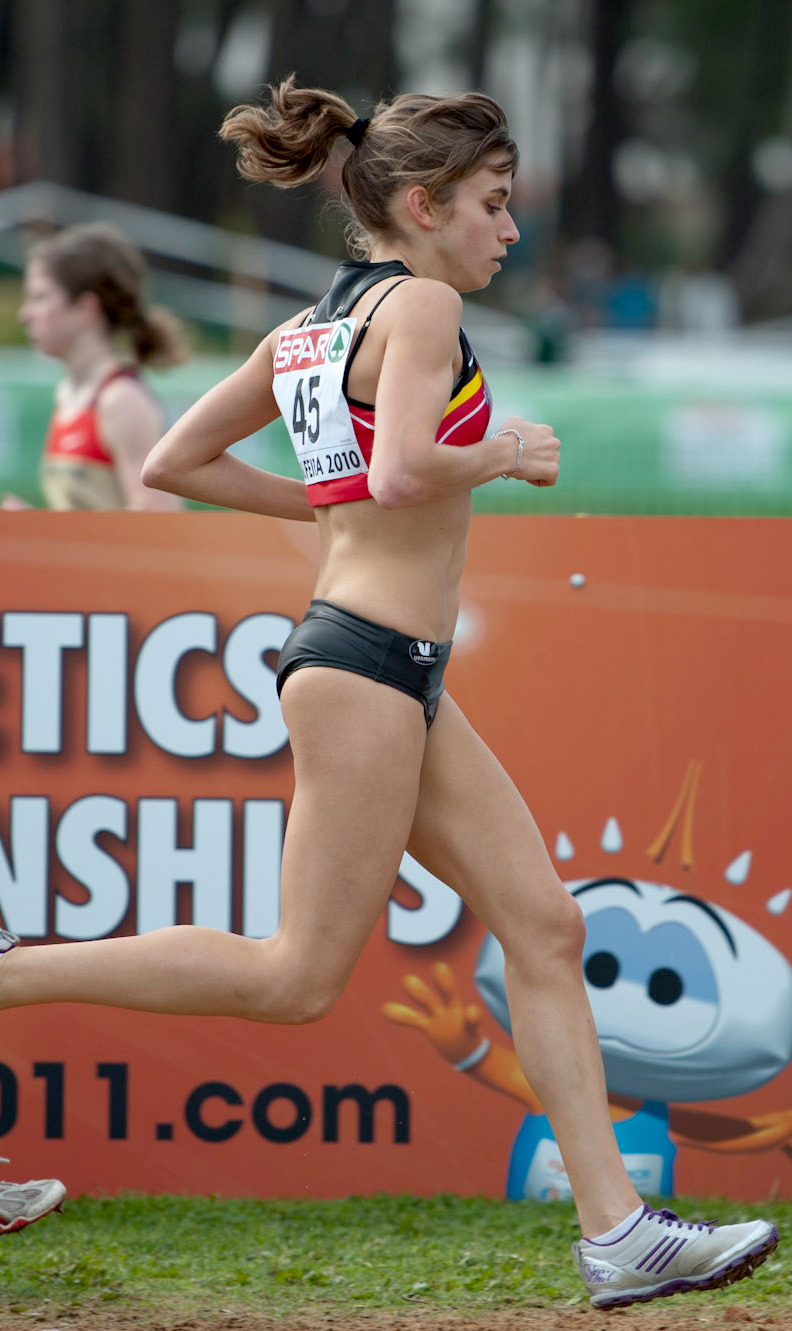
- Manuela Soccol in 2010

Personal information
- Born: 16 June 1988 (age 38)
- Height: 157 cm (5 ft 2 in)
- Weight: 42 kg (93 lb)

Sport
- Sport: Track and field
- Event: Marathon
- Club: Atletiekclub De Demer

Achievements and titles
- Personal best: 2:37:09 (2016)

Manuela Soccol (born 16 June 1988) is a Belgian marathon runner. She placed 74th at the 2016 Olympics.
