= Paulien Couckuyt =

Belgian athlete (born 1997)

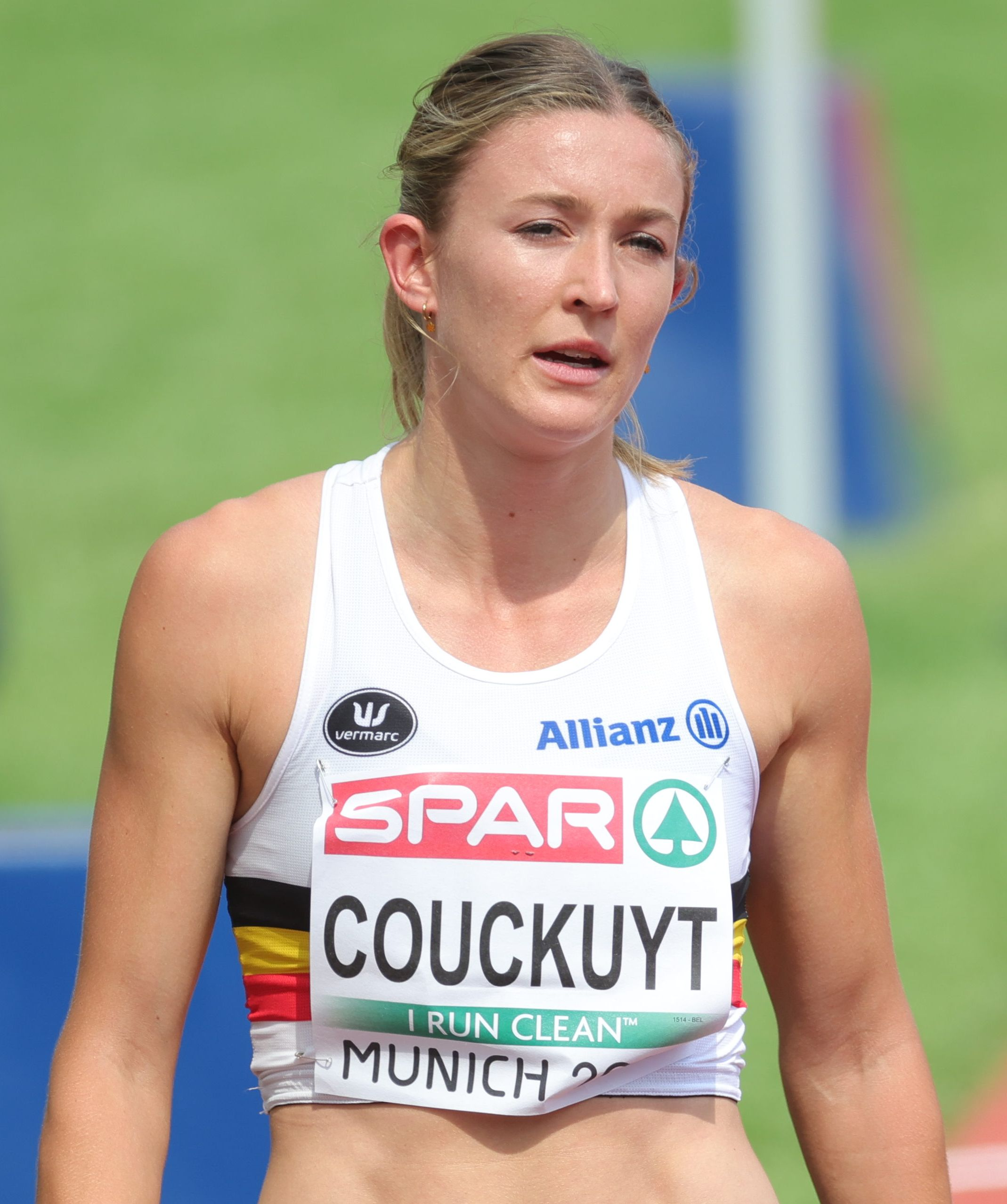

Personal information
- Nationality: Belgian
- Born: 19 May 1997 (age 29) Antwerp, Belgium

Sport
- Sport: Athletics
- Events: 400 metres hurdles; 400 metres
Medal record
Women's athletics
Representing Belgium
European U23 Championships
Gold medal – first place	2019 Gävle	400m hurdles

Paulien Couckuyt (born 19 May 1997) is a Belgian track and field athlete who specializes in middle-distance running and the 400 metres hurdles.

== Career ==
In July 2019, she won the gold medal in the women's 400 metres hurdles at the European Athletics U23 Championships in Gävle, Sweden, posting a personal best of 56.17s. In September, Couckuyt ran another personal best in the 400 metres hurdles at the Belgian Athletics Championships, posting a time of 55.46s, and with this time, she qualified for the 2019 World Athletics Championships. In October, she represented Belgium at the 2019 World Athletics Championships, competing in the women's 400 metres hurdles and women's 4 × 400 metres relay.

In May 2021, Couckuyt represented Belgium in the heats and final of the women's 4 × 400 metres relay at the 2021 World Athletics Relays in Chorzów, Poland, where the Belgian team finished 7th in the final. Later in the month, she ran a new personal best at the IFAM meeting in Oordegem, Belgium, and with a time of 55.37s, met the qualification criterium for the 2020 Summer Olympics in Tokyo, Japan. At the 2020 Summer Olympic Games, she finished 3rd in her heat, setting a new personal best and national record of 54.90s, and proceeded to the semi-final where she finished 3rd and was eliminated, setting again a personal best and new national record of 54.47s. She also ran in the heats and final of the women's 4 × 400 metres relay with the Belgian team finishing 7th in the final.

In July 2022, she ran in the final of the women's 4 × 400 metres relay at the 2022 World Athletics Championships in Eugene, Oregon finishing 6th. She also participated in the women's 400 metres hurdles, reaching the semi-final. Barely a month later, she ran in the heats of the women's 400 metres hurdles at the 2022 European Athletics Championships in Munich, Germany, but was eliminated in the heats. In November 2022, at a training camp with Team Belgium in Belek, Turkey, she incurred a serious injury to the anterior cruciate ligament of her left knee that required an operation and sidelined her for most of the 2023 season.

Having missed most of the 2023 season through injury, she spent the spring and summer of 2024 chasing the automatic qualification mark of 54.85s for the women's 400 metres hurdles at the 2024 Summer Olympics. On the last day of the Olympic qualification period on 30 June, she ran a 54.94s at the Belgian Athletics Championships, still not meeting the automatic qualification mark, but the time proved good enough to qualify for the 2024 Summer Olympics in Paris, France via the World Athletics Rankings. At the Olympics, she reached the semi-final stage but did not qualify for the finals. Her time of 54.64s proved good enough though to qualify for the 2025 World Athletics Championships in Tokyo, Japan.

Having missed most of the 2025 indoor season with injury, Couckuyt ran a personal best of 54.45s in the 400 metres hurdles at the 2025 Belgian Athletics Championships. A month later at the 2025 World Athletics Championships in Tokyo, Japan, she reached the semi-finals of the 400 metres hurdles but as at the 2024 Summer Olympics in Paris, France she failed to make the final finishing seventeenth in the semi-finals.

2006 proved to be an injury-free season for Couckuyt. She started out the year setting personal bests over 200 and 400 metres indoor. In June, she set a personal best of 54.32s at the Hanžeković Memorial Continental Gold Tour-meeting in Zagreb, Croatia. In July, she twice set a new personal best in the 400 metres hurdles: first at the Tampere, Finland, Continental Bronze Tour-meeting where she ran for the first time under 54s setting a personal best of 53.98s and then, two weeks before the start of the 2026 European Athletics Championships at the IFAM Oordegem, Belgium, Continental Bronze Tour-meeting she recorded the at that time second best European performance that year in the 400 metres hurdles lowering her personal best to 53.90s. In August, at those 2026 European Athletics Championships in Birmingham, England, starting out as a clear medal contender, she qualified fastest for the women's 400 metres hurdles final, setting a new personal best of 53.87s. Although she equalled that personal best in the final, it landed her just outside the medals in fourth place. She finished the 2026 season twice breaking Belgium's national record over the 400 metres hurdles, first at the 2026 Athletissima Diamond League meeting in Lausanne, Switzerland where she shaved more than half a second of her personal best finishing in 52.28s bettering Naomi Van den Broeck's time of 53.65s and then again at the 2026 Memorial Van Damme Diamond League meeting in Brussels, Belgium where she finished third in 53.20s.
