= Abdelhadi El Hachimi =

Belgian long-distance runner

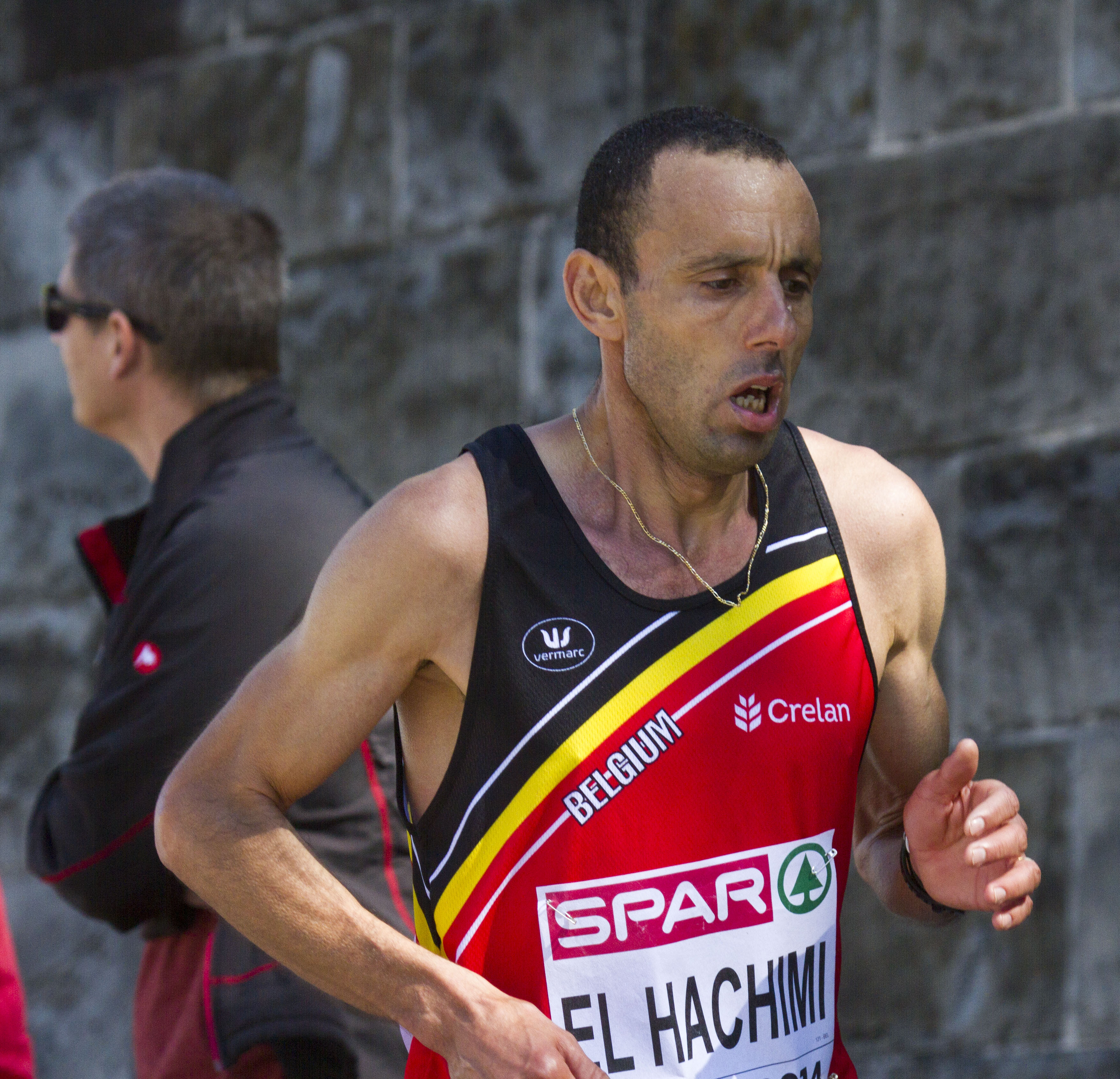
- Abdelhadi El Hachimi at the 2014 European Athletics Championships

Personal information
- Born: 15 December 1974 (age 51)

Sport
- Country: Belgium
- Sport: Track and field
- Event: Marathon

Abdelhadi El Hachimi (born 15 December 1974) is a Belgian long-distance runner who specialises in the marathon. He competed in the marathon event at the 2015 World Championships in Athletics in Beijing, China.
