= Swedish relay =

Athletics event

Swedish relay is an athletics track event in which teams comprise four runners. The first runner runs 100 meters, the second one 200 m, the third one 300 m and the fourth runner 400 m, so the total length of the race is one kilometer.

Usually Swedish relay is run in the competitions of children and youth, but it has also been run in the DN-Galan, Super Grand Prix competition in Stockholm. It is also contested at Norwegian Championships; the most successful clubs historically being IK Tjalve, IL i BUL and IL Gular.

The unofficial world record has been set by a team of four Jamaicans, Christopher Williams, Usain Bolt, Davian Clarke and Jermaine Gonzales at the DN Galan of 25 July 2006 with 1:46.59.

The medley relays have been a regular part of the World Youth Championships in Athletics and were contested by continental teams at the 2010 Summer Youth Olympics in this format.

== All-time top 25 ==
=== Men ===
Rank	Time	Team	Nation	Date	Place	Ref.
1	1:46.59	Puma Reggae Team; Christopher Williams (100 m); Usain Bolt (200 m); Davian Clarke (300 m); Jermaine Gonzales (400 m)	Jamaica	25 July 2006	Stockholm	
2	1:46.69	Nike Team		25 July 2006	Stockholm	
3	1:47.93	Dream Team; Frankie Fredericks; Terrence Trammell; Shawn Crawford; Michael Johnson	NAM; USA; USA; USA	15 September 2001	Yokohama	
4	1:47.94	USA 1	USA	16 July 2002	Stockholm	
5	1:48.27	Shingo Kawabata; Nobuharu Asahara; Kenji Tabata; Jun Osakada	Japan	15 September 2001	Yokohama	
6	1:48.30	USA 2	USA	16 July 2002	Stockholm	
7	1:48.35	Sweden 1	Sweden	16 July 2002	Stockholm	
8	1:48.36	Adam Basil; Steve Brimacombe; Paul Pearce; Clinton Hill	Australia	15 September 2001	Yokohama	
9	1:48.38	Doyle Pro Sports Team		25 July 2006	Stockholm	
10	1:49.09	Nike Team; Marcus Brunson; Derrick Brew; Jerome Davis; Michael Johnson	USA	17 July 2001	Stockholm	
11	1:49.23	Waseem Williams; Michael O'Hara; Okeen Williams; Martin Manley	JAM	14 July 2013	Donetsk	
12	1:49.24	Adidas Team		25 July 2006	Stockholm	
13	1:49.47	Ronald Darby; Aldrich Bailey; Najee Glass; Arman Hall	USA	10 July 2011	Lille	
14	1:49.50		South Africa	19 April 2019	Abidjan	
15	1:49.54	Marco Menchini; Giovanni Puggioni; Marco Vaccari; Andrea Nuti	ITA	5 June 1992	Sheffield	
16	1:49.61	Patrik Lövgren; Johan Engberg; Jimisola Laursen; Mikael Jakobsson	SWE	17 July 2001	Stockholm	
17	1:49.62			17 July 2001	Stockholm	
18	1:49.68	Russia	RUS	5 June 1993	Portsmouth	
19	1:50.14	Jaalen Jones; Noah Lyles; Taylor McLaughlin; Ryan Clark	USA	14 July 2013	Donetsk	
20	1:50.22	Daniel Plummer; Darren Chin; Graham Beasley; Andre Fernandez	GBR	6 September 2002	Barcelona	
21	1:50.33	Glauder Garzon; Alianni Echevarria; Jose Carlos Pena; Jose Cesar	Cuba	6 September 2002	Barcelona	
22	1:50.33	Colin Hepburn; Keenan Brock; Dedric Dukes; Joshua Mance	USA	12 July 2009	Bressanone	
23	1:50.40		Italy	5 June 1993	Portsmouth	
24	1:50.46	Tomasz Kaska; Piotr Zrada; Piotr Kedzia; Karol Grzegoczyk	Poland	15 July 2001	Debrecen	
25	1:50.52	Dalki Oda; Shunto Nagata; Kakeru Yamaki; Kaisei Yui	Japan	14 July 2013	Donetsk	

=== Women ===
Rank	Time	Team	Nation	Date	Place	Ref.
1	2:01.10	Marina Zhirova; Yelena Mizera; Yelena Ruzina; Tatyana Alekseyeva	Russia	5 June 1993	Portsmouth	
2	2:02.32	Zhanna Tamopolskaya; Viktoriya Fomenko; Aelita Yurchenko; Ludmila Dzhigalova	Ukraine	5 June 1993	Portsmouth	
3	2:03.42	Christania Williams; Shericka Jackson; Olivia James; Chrisann Gordon	Jamaica	10 July 2011	Lille	
4	2:03.83	Ashley Lodree; Allyson Felix; Angel Perkins; Stephanie Smith	United States	15 July 2001	Debrecen	
5	2:03.87	Jessica Onyepunuka; Alexandria Anderson; Krystin Lacy; Natasha Hastings	United States	13 July 2003	Sherbrooke	
6	2:03.92	Jennifer Madu; Bealoved Brown; Kendall Baisden; Robin Reynolds	United States	10 July 2011	Lille	
7	2:03.93	Khrystal Carter; Ebony Collins; Bianca Knight; Brandi Cross	United States	17 July 2005	Marrakesh	
8	2:04.32	Jordan Clark; Ashton Purvis; Briana Nelson; Ebony Eutsey	United States	12 July 2009	Bressanone	
9	2:04.57	Isabella Pastore; Margherita Castellani; Laura Frattaroli; Kelly Doualla	Italy	26 July 2025	Skopje	
10	2:05.13	Donna Hogarth; Simone Jacobs; Louise Fraser; Sandra Leigh	Great Britain	5 June 1993	Portsmouth	
11	2:05.15	Dior Hall; Ky Westbrook; Raevyn Rogers; Olivia Baker	United States	14 July 2013	Donetsk	
12	2:05.23	Viola Canovi; Margherita Castellani; Laura Frattaroli; Elisa Valensin	Italy	21 July 2024	Banská Bystrica	
13	2:05.54	Oliwia Kasprzak; Aleksandra Jeż; Zofia Tomczyk; Anastazja Kuś	Poland	21 July 2024	Banská Bystrica	
14	2:05.57		Germany	5 June 1993	Portsmouth	
15	2:05.59	Christania Williams; Shericka Jackson; Olivia James; Chrisann Gordon	Jamaica	9 July 2011	Lille	
16	2:05.72	Shamelle Pless; Khamica Bingham; Christian Brennan; Sage Watson	Canada	10 July 2011	Lille	
17	2:05.74	Chalonda Goodman; Ashton Purvis; Ryann Krais; Erica Alexander	United States	15 July 2007	Ostrava	
18	2:05.90	Nell Desir; Thea Brown; Shiloh Omotosho; Kara Dacosta	Great Britain	21 July 2024	Banská Bystrica	
19	2:05.93	Xenia Buri; Jelena Schranz; Timea Rankl; Mina Hirsbrunner	Switzerland	26 July 2025	Skopje	
20	2:06.13	Bianca Tita; Stefania Balint; Maria Capota; Alexandra Uta	Romania	29 July 2023	Maribor	
21	2:06.26	Deborah Oluwaseun Odeyemi; Florence Uwakwe; Ada Benjamin; Rita Ossai	Nigeria	10 July 2011	Lille	
22	2:06.30	Maja Gondek; Zofia Tomczyk; Aleksandra Przybylska; Milena Basinska	Poland	26 July 2025	Skopje	
23	2:06.45	Alice Pagliarini; Elisa Marcello; Valentina Vaccari; Elisa Valensin	Italy	29 July 2023	Maribor	
24	2:06.58	Jess Gulli-Nance; Olivia Tauro; Megan Hill; Jaimee-Lee Starr	Australia	17 July 2005	Marrakesh	
25	2:06.60	Tatiane Ferraz; Vanda Gomez; Franciela Krasucki; Josiane Valentim	Brazil	17 July 2005	Marrakesh	

== See also ==
- Distance medley relay
- Sprint medley relay
