= Ioulianna Roussou =

Greek middle-distance runner (born 2007)

Personal information
- Born: 11 May 2007 (age 19)

Sport
- Sport: Athletics
- Event: Middle-distance running
Medal record
Women's athletics
Representing Greece
Balkan Championships
Gold medal – first place	2026 Volos	1500m
Balkan Indoor Championships
Gold medal – first place	2026 Belgrade	1500m
World U20 Championships
Silver medal – second place	2026 Eugene	800 m
European Youth Olympic Festival
Silver medal – second place	2023 Maribor	800m

Ioulianna Roussou (born 11 May 2007) is a Greek middle-distance runner. She won the gold medal over 1500 metres at the Balkan Athletics Championships, both indoors and outdoors in 2026, and was runner-up over 800 metres at the 2026 World U20 Championships.

== Biography ==
Coached by Dimitris Platis, she is a member of GS Ilioupoli in Athens. She represented Greece at the 2025 European Athletics U20 Championships in Tampere, Finland, qualifying for the final of the 1500 metres, and placing seventh overall.

Roussou set a new Greek under-20 national record over 1500 metres, running 4:16.31 in February 2026, a time which also moved her to fourth on the Greek all-time list. This came a week after she also set an under-20 national record in the 3000 metres. She then won the gold medal at the 2026 Balkan Athletics Indoor Championships in Belgrade later that month with in 4:20.96 for the 1500 m.

In June 2026, she set a new Greek under-20 national record of 2:01.27 for the 800 metres. Later that month, she won the gold medal over 1500 metres at the 2026 Balkan Athletics Championships in Volos. She also won a silver medal at the Championships as part of Greek women’s 4 × 400 metres relay team.

In August 2026, she competed at the 2026 World Athletics U20 Championships in Eugene, USA. Having qualified for the final of the 800 metres, she won the silver medal running 2:03.08; five hundredths of a second behind Ziva Remic of Slovenia with Shaikira King of Great Britain in third. Roussou had taken advantage of a slow tactical race to animate the race and move to the front of the pack in the later stages.
