= Aloïs Abraham =

French athlete (born 2008)

Personal information
- Nationality: French
- Born: 25 July 2008 (age 18)
- Height: 180 cm (5 ft 11 in)
- Weight: 60 kg (132 lb)

Sport
- Country: France
- Sport: Athletics
- Events: Long-distance running, Cross Country running

Achievements and titles
- Personal bests: 800m: 1:51.08 (Montauban, 2025); 1500m: 3:38.62 (Carquefou, 2025) EU18B; 3000m: 7:58.42 (Decines, 2025); Road; 5km: 13:38 (Barcelona, 2025)
Medal record
Men's athletics
Representing France
World U20 Championships
Silver medal – second place	2026 Eugene	3000m
European Youth Olympic Festival
Gold medal – first place	2025 Skopje	1500m
European U18 Championships
Bronze medal – third place	2024 Banska Bystrica	1500m
European Cross Country Championships
Bronze medal – third place	2025 Lagoa	U20 race

Aloïs Abraham (born 25 July 2008) is a French long-distance and cross country runner. He was a silver medalist over 3000 metres at the 2026 World Athletics U20 Championships. He was previously a bronze medalist at the 2024 European Athletics U18 Championships over 1500 metres, and in the U20 race at the 2025 European Cross Country Championships.

== Biography ==
He is son of Alexis Abraham, a former French international athlete. His mother also competed in middle-distance running at an amateur level. His older brother, Joshua, has also been selected for the French national athletics team in youth categories. A member of Muret Athletics Club, Abraham became the new French U15 cross country champion in March 2023.

Abraham was a bronze medalist over 1500 metres at the 2024 European Athletics U18 Championships, finishing behind Filip Toul and Aldin Catovic, in Banská Bystrica, Slovakia. In December 2024, Abraham set a French under-18 record of 14:15 for 5km on the road whilst competing in Barcelona, Spain.

On 8 May 2025, he set a French U18 record of 8:06.78 for the 3000 metres at the Muret AC Interclub Meet. Later that month, he ran 3:39.46 in the 1500m at the Satuc Toulouse Athletics International Meeting, breaking the French record for his age group, which had stood for sixteen years and equaled the European U18 best time, held by the Dutchman Niels Laros since 2022. In June, he ran the 1500m in a time of 3:38.62 to set a new European U18 best and surpass the record of Laros. Abraham won the gold medal in the 1500 meters at the 2025 European Youth Olympic Festival (EYOF) in Skopje, with time of 3:48.39.

Abraham won the bronze medal at the 2025 European Cross Country Championships in Lagoa, Portugal on 14 December 2025. He set a French national U20 record over 5km of 13:38 in Barcelona on New Year's Eve. He was selected to represent France at the 2026 World Athletics Cross Country Championships in Tallahassee, placing 13th overall on 10 January 2026. He was selected to represent his country at the 2026 World Athletics U20 Championships, winning the 3000 m silver medal in 7:47.79 behind Emmanuel Kiprono of Kenya.
