= 2024 World Athletics U20 Championships – Women's 400 metres =

Women's 400 metres at the 2024 World Athletics U20 Championships
- Venue: Estadio Atlético de la VIDENA
- Dates: 28 August 2024 (heats & semi-finals); 29 August 2024 (final)
- Competitors: 52 from 35 nations
- Winning time: 51.29

Medalists
| gold medal | Lurdes Gloria Manuel | Czech Republic |
| silver medal | Dianna Proctor | Canada |
| bronze medal | Zaya Akins | United States |

The women's 400 metres at the 2024 World Athletics U20 Championships was held at the Estadio Atlético de la VIDENA in Lima, Peru on 28 and 29 August 2024.

== Records ==
U20 standing records prior to the 2024 World Athletics U20 Championships were as follows:

| Record | Athlete & Nationality | Mark | Location | Date |
|---|---|---|---|---|
| World U20 Record | Grit Breuer (GER) | 49.42 | Tokyo, Japan | 27 August 1991 |
| Championship Record | Ashley Spencer (USA) | 50.50 | Barcelona, Spain | 13 July 2012 |
| World U20 Leading | JaMeesia Ford (USA) | 51.24 | Eugene, United States | 22 June 2024 |

== Results ==
=== Heats ===
The first 3 athletes in each heat (Q) and the next 6 fastest (q) qualified to the semi-finals.

==== Heat 1 ====
| Rank | Lane | Athlete | Nation | Time | Notes |
|---|---|---|---|---|---|
| 1 | 9 | Charlotte Henrich | United Kingdom | 53.07 | Q |
| 2 | 5 | Johanna Martin | Germany | 53.22 | Q |
| 3 | 8 | Zita Szentgyörgyi | Hungary | 53.63 | Q |
| 4 | 6 | Madeleine Waddell | New Zealand | 54.02 | q |
| 5 | 3 | Camila Rodríguez | Dominican Republic | 55.24 | |
| 6 | 4 | Kenya Maturana | Mexico | 55.45 | |
| 7 | 2 | T'anna Liburd | Saint Kitts and Nevis | 55.91 | |
| 8 | 7 | Jithma Wijethunga | Sri Lanka | 56.16 | |

==== Heat 2 ====
| Rank | Lane | Athlete | Nation | Time | Notes |
|---|---|---|---|---|---|
| 1 | 1 | Dianna Proctor | Canada | 52.73 | Q, PB |
| 2 | 4 | Lurdes Gloria Manuel | Czech Republic | 52.76 | Q |
| 3 | 2 | Dominika Duraj | Poland | 53.16 | Q |
| 4 | 3 | Julia Ribeiro | Brazil | 53.87 | q |
| 5 | 8 | Borghild Oline Holstad | Norway | 54.48 | q |
| 6 | 5 | Narissa McPherson | Guyana | 54.67 | |
| 7 | 9 | Elena Cambiolo | Italy | 55.61 | |
| 8 | 7 | Chiara Risi | Switzerland | 56.11 | |
| 9 | 6 | Lina Keder | Slovenia | 56.54 | |

==== Heat 3 ====
| Rank | Lane | Athlete | Nation | Time | Notes |
|---|---|---|---|---|---|
| 1 | 6 | Ella Onojuvwevwo | Nigeria | 52.19 | Q |
| 2 | 4 | Paola Loboa | Colombia | 52.81 | Q, PB |
| 3 | 9 | Jemma Pollard | Australia | 53.45 | Q |
| 4 | 3 | Line Safaa | Norway | 53.64 | q, SB |
| 5 | 1 | Jonbibi Hukmova | Uzbekistan | 54.12 | q, PB |
| 6 | 8 | Abrina Wright | Jamaica | 54.63 | |
| 7 | 7 | Angelique Abberley | Mauritius | 54.66 | |
| 8 | 2 | Malena Galvan | Argentina | 53.37 | =PB |
| 9 | 5 | Neeru Pahtak | India | 55.58 | |

==== Heat 4 ====
| Rank | Lane | Athlete | Nation | Time | Notes |
|---|---|---|---|---|---|
| 1 | 8 | Zaya Akins | United States | 52.69 | Q |
| 2 | 5 | Kara Dacosta | United Kingdom | 53.59 | Q |
| 3 | 3 | Maria Denisa Capotă | Romania | 54.03 | Q |
| 4 | 6 | Precious Molepo | South Africa | 54.11 | q |
| 5 | 1 | Lenka Gymerská | Slovakia | 55.01 | |
| 6 | 2 | Ana Prieto | Spain | 55.75 | |
| 7 | 4 | Paola Mireles | Mexico | 56.58 | |
| 8 | 9 | Grazielly Sena | Brazil | 56.75 | |
| 9 | 7 | Giuliana Oroná | Uruguay | 58.42 | |

==== Heat 5 ====
| Rank | Lane | Athlete | Nation | Time | Notes |
|---|---|---|---|---|---|
| 1 | 5 | Elisa Valensin | Italy | 53.82 | Q |
| 2 | 7 | Karolina Zbičajnik | Slovenia | 53.86 | Q |
| 3 | 4 | Amelia Rowe | Australia | 54.19 | Q |
| 4 | 3 | Tianna Springer | Guyana | 54.49 | |
| 5 | 1 | Michelle Liem | Switzerland | 55.42 | |
| 6 | 8 | Eir Hlesdottir | Iceland | 55.48 | |
| 7 | 6 | Chrysi Fountoulaki | Greece | 55.54 | |
| 8 | 2 | Tyhra Charles | Saint Vincent and the Grenadines | 55.87 | |
| 9 | 9 | Salamatou Halidou Hassane | Niger | DNS | |

==== Heat 6 ====
| Rank | Lane | Athlete | Nation | Time | Notes |
|---|---|---|---|---|---|
| 1 | 9 | Michaela Mouton | United States | 53.29 | Q |
| 2 | 6 | Nahomy Castro | Colombia | 53.37 | Q, SB |
| 3 | 4 | Shanque Williams | Jamaica | 54.22 | Q |
| 4 | 7 | Chane Vermeulen | South Africa | 54.49 | |
| 5 | 3 | Kiara Webb | Denmark | 54.60 | |
| 6 | 5 | Laavinia Jaiganth | Singapore | 54.66 | NU20R |
| 7 | 2 | Stefania Balint | Romania | 55.05 | |
| 8 | 8 | Kristina Petkova | Bulgaria | 55.09 | |
| 9 | 1 | Anuskha Kumbhar | India | 56.52 | |

=== Semi-finals ===
The first 2 athletes in each heat (Q) and the next 2 fastest (q) qualified to the final.

==== Heat 1 ====
| Rank | Lane | Athlete | Nation | Time | Notes |
|---|---|---|---|---|---|
| 1 | 6 | Zaya Akins | United States | 52.11 | Q |
| 2 | 8 | Elisa Valensin | Italy | 52.23 | Q, NU20R |
| 3 | 5 | Paola Loboa | Colombia | 53.17 | |
| 4 | 9 | Jemma Pollard | Australia | 53.49 | |
| 5 | 3 | Borghild Oline Holstad | Norway | 53.99 | PB |
| 6 | 7 | Kara Dacosta | United Kingdom | 54.24 | |
| 7 | 4 | Shanque Williams | Jamaica | 54.57 | |
| 8 | 2 | Julia Ribeiro | Brazil | 55.12 | |

==== Heat 2 ====
| Rank | Lane | Athlete | Nation | Time | Notes |
|---|---|---|---|---|---|
| 1 | 7 | Dianna Proctor | Canada | 52.59 | Q, PB |
| 2 | 8 | Johanna Martin | Germany | 52.69 | Q |
| 3 | 6 | Charlotte Henrich | United Kingdom | 52.74 | q |
| 4 | 2 | Madeleine Waddell | New Zealand | 53.50 | PB |
| 5 | 5 | Nahomy Castro | Colombia | 53.75 | |
| 6 | 9 | Zita Szentgyörgyi | Hungary | 53.94 | |
| 7 | 4 | Maria Denisa Capotă | Romania | 53.96 | PB |
| 8 | 3 | Precious Molepo | South Africa | 54.55 | |

==== Heat 3 ====
| Rank | Lane | Athlete | Nation | Time | Notes |
|---|---|---|---|---|---|
| 1 | 8 | Lurdes Gloria Manuel | Czech Republic | 51.91 | Q |
| 2 | 5 | Ella Onojuvwevwo | Nigeria | 51.99 | Q |
| 3 | 7 | Michaela Mouton | United States | 52.72 | q |
| 4 | 6 | Karolina Zbičajnik | Slovenia | 53.19 | SB |
| 5 | 9 | Dominika Duraj | Poland | 53.35 | |
| 6 | 4 | Amelia Rowe | Australia | 53.47 | |
| 7 | 3 | Line Safaa | Norway | 53.99 | |
| 8 | 2 | Jonbibi Hukmova | Uzbekistan | 54.87 | |

=== Final ===
| Rank | Lane | Athlete | Nation | Time | Notes |
|---|---|---|---|---|---|
| 1st place, gold medalist(s) | 5 | Lurdes Gloria Manuel | Czech Republic | 51.29 | |
| 2nd place, silver medalist(s) | 8 | Dianna Proctor | Canada | 51.98 | PB |
| 3rd place, bronze medalist(s) | 7 | Zaya Akins | United States | 52.00 | |
| 4 | 4 | Johanna Martin | Germany | 52.49 | PB |
| 5 | 6 | Ella Onojuvwevwo | Nigeria | 52.61 | |
| 6 | 9 | Elisa Valensin | Italy | 52.69 | |
| 7 | 3 | Charlotte Henrich | United Kingdom | 52.71 | |
| 8 | 2 | Michaela Mouton | United States | 53.09 | |
