= Athletics at the 2023 European Youth Summer Olympic Festival =

- Date: 24–29 July

Athletics at the 2023 European Youth Summer Olympic Festival was held in Maribor, Slovenia, from 24 to 29 July 2023.

== Medal table ==
* Host nation (Slovenia)

| Rank | Nation | Gold | Silver | Bronze | Total |
|---|---|---|---|---|---|
| 1 | Czech Republic | 7 | 3 | 1 | 11 |
| 2 | France | 6 | 4 | 2 | 12 |
| 3 | Hungary | 4 | 0 | 5 | 9 |
| 4 | Poland | 3 | 2 | 1 | 6 |
| 5 | Greece | 2 | 3 | 5 | 10 |
| 6 | Spain | 2 | 2 | 3 | 7 |
| 7 | Norway | 2 | 2 | 2 | 6 |
| 8 | Switzerland | 2 | 2 | 0 | 4 |
| 9 | Romania | 2 | 1 | 2 | 5 |
| 10 | Croatia | 2 | 1 | 0 | 3 |
| 11 | Italy | 1 | 5 | 2 | 8 |
| 12 | Finland | 1 | 3 | 2 | 6 |
| 13 | Estonia | 1 | 2 | 4 | 7 |
| 14 | Germany | 1 | 1 | 4 | 6 |
| 15 | Ukraine | 1 | 1 | 0 | 2 |
| 16 | Belgium | 1 | 0 | 1 | 2 |
| 16 | Serbia | 1 | 0 | 1 | 2 |
| 18 | Austria | 1 | 0 | 0 | 1 |
| 18 | Denmark | 1 | 0 | 0 | 1 |
| 20 | Turkey | 0 | 3 | 0 | 3 |
| 21 | Slovenia* | 0 | 1 | 2 | 3 |
| 22 | Bulgaria | 0 | 1 | 1 | 2 |
| 22 | Lithuania | 0 | 1 | 1 | 2 |
| 24 | Israel | 0 | 1 | 0 | 1 |
| 25 | Ireland | 0 | 0 | 1 | 1 |
| 25 | Portugal | 0 | 0 | 1 | 1 |
| 25 | Sweden | 0 | 0 | 1 | 1 |
| Totals (27 entries) | | 41 | 39 | 42 | 122 |

== Medalists ==
=== Boys ===
==== Track ====
| Event | Gold | | Silver | | Bronze | |
|---|---|---|---|---|---|---|
| 100 m | Ylann Bizasene; France | 10.53 | Ido Peretz; Israel | 10.70 | Zalán Deák; Hungary | 10.75 |
| 200 m | Akira Mogbejumireyi Ayomide Eghagha; Switzerland | 21.07 | Danielius Vasiliauskas; Lithuania | 21.20 | Pedro Afonso; Portugal | 21.41 |
| 400 m | Ondřej Loupal; Czech Republic | 47:07 | Simone Giliberto; Italy | 47:55 | Daniel Isaias Artigas; Spain | 47:86 |
| 800 m | Yanis Vanlanduyt; France | 1:52.11 | Žan Ogrinc; Slovenia | 1:52.58 | Mattia De Rocchi; Italy | 1:53.10 |
| 1500 m | Kristian Braathen Boerve; Norway | 3:52.37 | Théodore Liot; France | 3:52.64 | Albert Szirbek; Hungary | 3:53.01 |
| 3000 m | Aldin Ćatović; Serbia | 8:21.43 | Magnus Oeyen; Norway | 8:21.96 | Oscar Gaitan; Spain | 8:22.25 |
| 110 m hurdles | Matyáš Zach; Czech Republic | 13.36 | Janko Kišak; Croatia | 13.39 | Tristan Konso; Estonia | 13.59 |
| 400 m hurdles | Joel Frederik von d'Ahe; Denmark | 51.79 | Vladimiros Andreadis; Greece | 52.70 | Savva Novikov; Estonia | 53.02 |
| 2000 m steeplechase | Alin Savlovschi; Romania | 5:39.51 | Isaac Duportal; France | 5:40.30 | Benjamin Marton Szabo; Hungary | 5:41.52 |
| Medley relay | France; Ylann Bizasene; Arthur Gheerardyn-Renou; Sayf Mohamed Reggad; Yanis Vanlanduyt | 1:52.68 | Switzerland; Kilian Arne Borner; Akira Mogbejumireyi Ayomide Eghagha; Robin Mike Gloor; Jan Rickenbach | 1:53.56 | Italy; Matia de Rocchi; Leo Oumar Domenis; Simone Giliberto; Matteo Togni | 1:53.72 |
| 5000 m walk | Daniel Monfort; Spain | 20:22.18 CR | Giuseppe Disabato; Italy | 20:35.69 | Nick Joel Richardt; Germany | 21:05.41 |

==== Field ====
| Event | Gold | | Silver | | Bronze | |
|---|---|---|---|---|---|---|
| High jump | Elijah Pasquier; France | 2.12 | Yasir Kuduban; Turkey | 2.09 | Paschalis Gennikis; Greece | 2.06 |
| Pole vault | Fabio Marco; Spain | 5.10 | Karl Kristjan Pohlak; Estonia | 5.05 | Pavlos Kriaras; Greece | 5.05 |
| Long jump | Petr Meindlschmid; Czech Republic | 7.90 | James Armant Sordet; France | 7.45 | Cristian Marius Popescu; Romania | 7.27 |
| Triple jump | Ioannis Gkartsios; Greece | 15.73 | Aldo Rocchi; Italy | 15.72 | Jeremie Nzoungou; France | 15.48 |
| Shot put | Dimitrios Antonatos; Greece | 20.72 | Aatu Kangasniemi; Finland | 20.15 | Kelson Josue De Carvalho; Germany | 19.77 |
| Discus throw | Samuel Conjungo-Taumhas; France | 61.71 | David Jarolimek; Czech Republic | 60.05 | Cian Crampton; Ireland | 59.32 |
| Hammer throw | Armin Szabados; Hungary | 78.92 | Aatu Kangasniemi; Finland | 75.09 | Nikolaos Sidirenios; Greece | 73.41 |
| Javelin throw | Roch Krukowski; Poland | 79.40 | Illia Saievskyi; Ukraine | 76.11 | Tom Tersek; Slovenia | 73.57 |

==== Combined ====
| Event | Gold | | Silver | | Bronze | |
|---|---|---|---|---|---|---|
| Decathlon | Hubert Trościanka; Poland | 7354 | Daniel Hanzelka; Czech Republic | 7342 | Leon Clair; Germany | 7340 |

=== Girls ===
==== Track ====
| Event | Gold | | Silver | | Bronze | |
|---|---|---|---|---|---|---|
| 100 m | Miia Ott; Estonia | 11.80 | Alice Pagliarini; Italy | 11.88 | Zita Szentgyorgyi; Hungary | 11.89 |
| 200 m | Terezie Taborska; Czech Republic | 23.61 CR | Maja Barbara Woźniak; Poland | 24.08 | Miia Ott; Estonia | 24.21 |
| 400 m | Anastazja Kuś; Poland | 53.21 | Edanur Tulum; Turkey | 53.32 | Line Al-Saiddi; Norway | 53.60 |
| 800 m | Adela Holubova; Czech Republic | 2:06.15 | Ioulianna Roussou; Greece | 2:06.68 | Marta Mitjans; Spain | 2:06.96 |
| 1500 m | Shirin Andrina Kerber; Switzerland | 4:17.52 | Ayca Fidanoglu; Turkey | 4:17.74 | Tia Tanja Zivko; Slovenia | 4:19.80 |
| 3000 m | Jana Johanová; Czech Republic | 9:30.10 | Carla Cabezas; Spain | 9:31.78 | Alexandra Maria Hudea; Romania | 9:32.21 |
| 100 m hurdles | Mia Wild; Croatia Laura Montauban; France | 13.22 | None awarded | | Zuzanna Zając; Poland | 13.22 |
| 400 m hurdles | Olha Mashanienkova; Ukraine | 56.28 CR | Alexandra Stefania Uta; Romania | 56.31 | Meta Tumba; France | 57.10 |
| 2000 m steeplechase | Karolina Jarosova; Czech Republic | 6:23.58 CR | Andrea Nygaard Vie; Norway | 6:33.99 | Majken Maria Natalie Soederlund Larsson; Sweden | 6:36.01 |
| Medley relay | Romania; Stefania Balint; Maria Denisa Capota; Bianca Maria Tita; Alexandra Stefania Uta | 2:06.13 CR | Italy; Elisa Marcello; Alice Pagliarini; Valentina Vaccari; Elisa Valensin | 2:06.45 | Czech Republic; Viktorie Janska; Eliska Kramesova; Ester Parohova; Terezie Taborska | 2:07.16 |
| 5000 m walk | Alexandra Kovacs; Hungary | 22:42.91 | Julia Suarez; Spain | 22:48.02 | Mina Stanković; Serbia | 22:48.30 |

==== Field ====
| Event | Gold | | Silver | | Bronze | |
|---|---|---|---|---|---|---|
| High jump | Ella Oluchi Obeta; Germany | 1.83 | Valeria Smirnova; Estonia | 1.83 | Iren Petkov Saraboyukova; Bulgaria | 1.80 |
| Pole vault | Magdalena Rauter; Austria | 4.00 | Apolena Švábíková; Czech Republic | 3.90 | Embla Matilde Njerve; Norway Emma Meszaros; Hungary Evgenia Maria Panagiotou; Greece | 3.90 |
| Long jump | Bori Rózsahegyi; Hungary | 6.32 | Radina Velichkova; Bulgaria | 6.09 | Laura Ooghe; Belgium | 6.07 |
| Triple jump | Erika Giorgia Anoeta Saraceni; Italy | 13.42 | Olga Szlachta; Poland | 13.29 | Aureja Beniusyte; Lithuania | 13.11 |
| Shot put | Nafy Thiam; Belgium | 17.44 | Maria Rafailidou; Greece | 16.25 | Ella Mantyla; Finland | 16.22 |
| Discus throw | Helene Ramslien; Norway | 49.16 | Frieda Echterhoff; Germany | 48.17 | Maria Rafailidou; Greece | 47.95 |
| Hammer throw | Pinja Karha; Finland | 67.29 | Marie Rougetet; France | 66.17 | Johanna Marrwitz; Germany | 65.38 |
| Javelin throw | Vita Barbic; Croatia | 60.48 | Rebecca Nelimarkka; Finland | 58.91 | Heti Väät; Estonia | 54.44 |

==== Combined ====
| Event | Gold | | Silver | | Bronze | |
|---|---|---|---|---|---|---|
| Heptathlon | Sarolta Maria Kriszt; Hungary | 5830 | Lucia Ursina Acklin; Switzerland | 5808 | Enni Virjonen; Finland | 5633 |
