= Radina Velichkova =

Bulgarian athlete

Personal information
- Born: 15 December 2007 (age 18)

Sport
- Sport: Athletics
- Event(s): Sprint; Long jump

Achievements and titles
- Personal best(s): 60m: 7.33s (2026); 100m: 11.45s (2025) NU18B; 200m: 23.73s (2024); Long jump: 6.29m (2023); Triple jump: 12.80m (2026)
Medal record
Women's athletics
Representing Bulgaria
European U18 Championships
Gold medal – first place	2024 Banská Bystrica	100m
Bronze medal – third place	2024 Banská Bystrica	Long jump
European Youth Olympic Festival
Silver medal – second place	2023 Maribor	Long jump

Radina Velichkova (born 15 December 2007) is a Bulgarian sprinter and long jumper.

== Career ==
She won silver in the long jump at the 2023 European Youth Summer Olympic Festival in Maribor.

At the 2024 Balkan U18 Championships in Maribor, Velichkova won the 100m title in a European U18 leading time of 11.48 seconds. She won gold in the 100 metres and bronze in the long jump at the 2024 European Athletics U18 Championships.

Velichkova won the 100 metres title at the Balkan U20 Championships in July 2025 in Romania, in 11.45 seconds. She was a semi-finalist at the 2025 European Athletics U20 Championships in Tampere, Finland, winning her 100 metres heat into a 3.8 m/s headwind with 11.98s.

Competing at the senior Bulgarian Indoor Athletics Championships in Sofia on 28 February 2026 she placed second overall in the 60 metres, running a personal best 7.33 seconds.
