= Medley relay =

Medley relay may refer to:

Swimming

- Medley swimming, mixed distance relay events

Track and field

- Distance medley relay
- Sprint medley relay
- Swedish medley relay
