= Margherita Castellani =

Italian sprinter (born 2008)

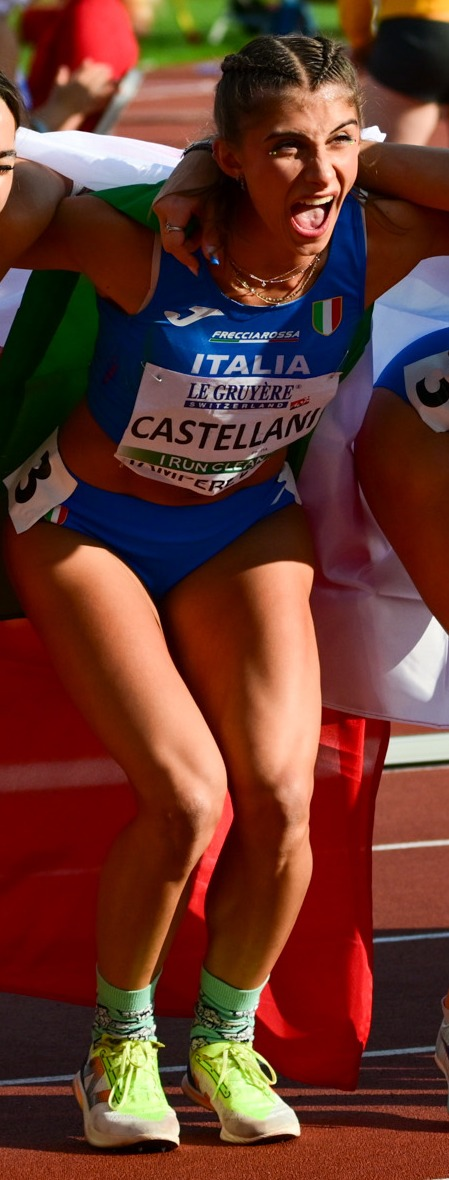

Personal information
- Nationality: Italian
- Born: 10 November 2008 (age 17)

Sport
- Sport: Athletics
- Event: Sprint
- Club: G.S. Fiamme Oro
Medal record
Women's athletics
Representing Italy
European U20 Championships
Gold medal – first place	2025 Tampere	4x100 m relay
European Youth Olympic Festival
Gold medal – first place	2025 Skopje	200 m
Gold medal – first place	2025 Skopje	Medley relay
European U18 Championships
Gold medal – first place	2024 Banská Bystrica	Medley relay
Silver medal – second place	2024 Banská Bystrica	200m

Margherita Castellani (born 10 November 2008) is an Italian sprinter. She is the Italian under-20 record holder in the 200 metres.

== Biography ==
From Perugia, she is a member of Atletica Arcs Cus Perugia.

In June 2024, Castellani ran 54.09 seconds for the 400 metres. On 20 July 2024, Castellani won the silver medal in a 200 metres personal best of 23.35 seconds, finishing behind compatriot Elisa Valensin, at the 2024 European Athletics U18 Championships in Banská Bystrica, Slovakia. She later won the gold medal alongside Valensin as part of the Italian medley relay team at the Championships, in a European youth best time. In August, she ran with the Italian 4 x 400 metres relay team at the 2024 World Athletics U20 Championships in Lima, Peru, as the team placed fifth overall.

In February 2025, she broke Valensin's Italian indoor age-group record for the 200 metres with 23.63 seconds to win the Italian U18 Indoor Championships race. That summer, Castellani won the Italian youth championships in Rieti over 200 metres, and went on to win gold medals in the 200 metres and in the sprint relay at the 2025 Youth Olympic Festival in Skopje. Later that summer, and was a gold medalist alongside Alice Pagliarini, Elisa Valensin and Kelly Doualla in the women's 4 x 100 metres sprint relay at the 2025 European Athletics U20 Championships in Tampere, Finland.

In May 2026, she ran at the 2026 World Athletics Relays in the women's 4 × 100 metres relay in Gaborone, Botswana. Competing at the 2026 World Athletics U20 Championships in Eugene, Oregon, she qualified for the final of the 200 metres in an Italian national U20 record of 22.99 seconds.
