= Molly Daly =

Irish sprinter (born 2008)

Personal information
- Nationality: Irish
- Born: 26 March 2008 (age 18)

Sport
- Sport: Athletics
- Event: Sprints
- Club: Kilkenny Harriers

Achievements and titles
- Personal bests: 60m: 7.93 (2024); 100m: 12.04 (2025); 200m: 23.67 (2025); 400m: 53.74 (2026)

Molly Daly (born 26 March 2008) is an Irish sprinter.

== Biography ==
From County Kilkenny, she is the daughter of athletes Fiona Norwood and Rob Daly who both represented Ireland at senior level in athletics. Her maternal grandfather Robert Norwood also represented Ireland over 400 metres. Following Daly's senior international debut in 2026, it was the first time three generations of the same family had represented Ireland in athletics at the senior level.

Daly is a member of Kilkenny City Harriers, having started participation there at under-8 level and is also coached by her parents. In July 2023, she ran a personal best over 200 metres of 25.31 to win at the All-Irelands Juniors age-group championships. At the age of 16 years-old a few months later in January 2024 she was first across the line in the under-20 All-Ireland Juniors over 200 metres indoors, only to be disqualified for a lane infringement in the home straight disqualified her, despite there being no time advantage. However, she had a personal best time of 24.54 recorded in the heats.

Daly ran over 200 metres at the EYOF Gala in Wetzlar, Germany in June 2025, securing a personal best time of 23.67 seconds. Competing at the 2025 European Youth Olympics in Skopje, North Macedonia she ran alongside Destiny Lawal, Erin Friel and Ellis McHugh as a member of the Ireland girls medley relay team as they set a new Irish national under-18 record to finish in fourth place overall.

In March 2026, Daly ran a time of 53.74 seconds for the 400 metres indoors, in only her third ever race over the distance to win the Irish U20 indoor title ahead of Friel in Athlone. Daly was named in the Irish team for the 2026 World Athletics Relays in Botswana, running on the opening day in the women's 4 × 400 m relay alongside Rachel McCann, Jenna Breen and Arlene Crossan.
