= Terezie Táborská =

Czech sprinter (born 2006)

Personal information
- Born: 11 February 2006 (age 20)

Sport
- Sport: Athletics
- Event: Sprint

Achievements and titles
- Personal best(s): 200m: 23.07 NU20R (2025); 400m: 52.93 (2024); Indoors; 60m: 7.42 (2024); 200m: 23.54 NU20R (2024)
Medal record
Women's athletics
Representing Czech Republic
European U20 Championships
Bronze medal – third place	2025 Tampere	200 m
Bronze medal – third place	2023 Jerusalem	4x100m relay
Bronze medal – third place	2023 Jerusalem	4x400m relay
European Youth Olympic Festival
Gold medal – first place	2023 Maribor	200 m

Terezie Táborská (born 11 February 2006) is a Czech sprinter. She is the Czech under-20 national record holder over 200 metres, both indoors and outdoors.

== Biography ==
She is from Prague 10 but trains in Nehvizdy where she is coached by Tomáš Vojtek at Sokol Nehvizdy. She won the Czech youth national championships in both the 100 and 200 meters in 2023. She placed sixth individually in the 200 metres and won bronze medals in both the 4x100 metres relay and 4x400 metres relay at the 2023 European Athletics U20 Championships in Jerusalem. She also won the 200 metres title in Maribor, Slovenia, at the 2023 European Youth Summer Olympic Festival in 23.61 seconds.

She ran as part of the Czech team at the 2024 World Athletics Indoor Championships in Glasgow, Scotland in March 2024. She was a semi-finalist at the 2024 World Athletics U20 Championships in Lima, Peru.

Táborská ran the 300m in 37.83 in Prague in May 2025, improving Barbora Malíková's national best from 2018. She set a personal best of 23.07 seconds for the 200 metres in June 2025 to win the Czech under-20 national title and set a Czech under-20 national record. It was also the fastest 200m by a female Czech sprinter of any age in the last fifteen years, since Denisa Helceletová in the 2010 and places her sixth on the Czech all-time list.

She ran 23.80 seconds to qualify for the semi-finals of the 200 metres at the 2025 European Athletics U20 Championships in Tampere, before reaching the final with a run of 23.52 in her semi-final (-0.4). In the final, she won the bronze medal.

In May 2026, she ran at the 2026 World Athletics Relays in the women's 4 × 400 metres relay in Gaborone, Botswana.
