= Erin Friel =

Irish sprinter (born 2008)

Personal information
- Nationality: Irish
- Born: 15 February 2008 (age 18)

Sport
- Sport: Athletics
- Event: Sprinting

Achievements and titles
- Personal bests: 200 m(i): 24.24 (Athlone, 2025); 400 m: 54.02 (Skopje, 2025)
Medal record
Women's athletics
Representing Ireland
European Youth Olympic Festival
| Bronze medal – third place | 2025 Skopje | 400 m |

Erin Friel (born 15 February 2008) is an Irish sprinter.

== Early life ==
Friel is from Newtown Cunningham, in County Donegal. She was educated at Loreto Secondar School.

== Career ==
Friel is a member of Letterkenny Athletics Club. Shortly after her 17th birthday, Friel set a new Donegal record of 24.82 seconds for the 200 metres to beat the previous record set by Mary McLoone in 2009, before finishing sixth in the 200m final at the 2025 Irish Indoor Athletics Championships.

Friel won the Irish under-20 national title over 400 metres in July 2025. She was a bronze medalist over 400 metres at the 2025 European Youth Olympics in Skopje, North Macedonia. Later at the Games, she was a member of the Ireland girls medley relay team as they set a new Irish national under-18 record to finish in fourth place overall. Friel competed for Ireland at the 2025 European Athletics U20 Championships in Tampere, Finland. Friel was named as a reserve for the senior Irish relay pool for the 2025 World Athletics Championships in Tokyo, Japan.

Friel placed second to Molly Daly at the 2026 Irish U20 Indoor Championships over 400 metres. Having ran an indoors personal best of 54.20 seconds for the 400 metres in 2026, she was named in the Irish team for the 2026 World Athletics Relays in Botswana, making her senior international debut in the mixed 4 x 400 metres relay on 3 May. In May, Friel won the senior girls' 400m title in 54.59 seconds at the Irish Schools Track and Field Championships.
