= Pedro Afonso (sprinter) =

Portuguese sprinter (born 2007)

Personal information
- Born: 10 January 2007 (age 19)

Sport
- Sport: Athletics
- Event: Sprint

Achievements and titles
- Personal bests: 200m: 20.66 (2025) NU20R; 400m: 45.78 (2025) NU20R
Medal record
Men's athletics
Representing Portugal
European U20 Championships
Silver medal – second place	2025 Tampere	200 m

Pedro Afonso (born 10 January 2007) is a Portuguese sprinter. He ran in the Portuguese 4 x 400 metres relay team who were finalists at the 2025 World Championships and set a new national record. He is the national under-20 record holder for the 200 metres and 400 metres. He was a silver medalist at the 2025 European Athletics U20 Championships.

== Biography ==
A Sport Lisboa e Benfica athlete based in Lisbon, he ran as part of the Portuguese men's 4 x100 metres sprint relay team which set a new national under-18 record of 41.79 seconds in Huelva in June 2023.

He competed for Portugal in the 200 metres at the 2024 European Athletics U18 Championships in Banská Bystrica, Slovakia, qualified fastest from the preliminary heats with a time of 21.31 (+0.4 m/s) although he was unable to complete his semi-final race after suffering an injury.

In June 2025, he set a new Portuguese under-20 record for the 200 metres, and moved into the top-ten of the Portuguese all-time list when he ran 20.78 seconds (wind: 0.0 m/s), breaking the previous record which had stood since 1985 by Luís Barroso. He lowered it further later that month in Mannheim, Germany, running 20.68 seconds. The following month, he won Portuguese under-20 titles in both the 200 metres and the 400 metres with times of 20.66 and 45.78 respectively.

He chose to concentrate only on the 200 metres races at the 2025 European Athletics U20 Championships in Tampere, Finland. He won his preliminary heat in 21.24 seconds (-1.06) and his semi-final in 20.74 seconds (-2.4), before winning the silver medal in the final behind Diego Nappi of Italy in with 20.85 seconds into a strong headwind (-2.9). He also competed in the men’s 4 x 100 metres relay at the championships.

He ran in the men's 4 x 400 metres relay for Portugal at the 2025 World Athletics Championships in Tokyo, Japan, helping the team qualify for the final with a national record time of 2:59.70, running alongside Omar Elkhatib, João Coelho and Ericsson Tavares, the first time a Portuguese team had run under three minutes.

In February 2026, Afonso placed third overall in his first race over 400 metres indoors, at the Sparkassen Indoor Meeting Dortmund, a World Athletics Indoor Tour Bronze meeting, running 46.49. In March 2026, he ran in the men's 4 x 400 metres relay at the 2026 World Athletics Indoor Championships, as the Portuguese team placed fifth in the final.

Competing at the 2026 World Athletics Relays in Botswana, he was part of the Portugal men's 4 x 400 metres relay team which set a national record of 2:59.01 on the opening day. In August, he was a finalist in the 200 metres at the 2026 World Athletics U20 Championships in Eugene, Oregon. That month, he also competed in the men's 4 × 400 metres relay at the 2026 European Athletics Championships in Birmingham, England.
