= Allika Inkeri Moser =

Estonian athlete (born 2008)

Personal information
- Nationality: Estonian
- Born: 27 March 2008 (age 18)

Sport
- Sport: Athletics
- Event: Pole vault

Achievements and titles
- Personal bests: Pole vault: 4.52 m WU18B (Skopje, 2025)
Medal record
Women's athletics
Representing Estonia
European Youth Olympic Festival
Gold medal – first place	2025 Skopje	Pole vault

Allika Inkeri Moser (born 27 March 2008) is an Estonian multi-event athlete. In 2025, she set a world under-18 best in the pole vault. She is a multiple-time winner of the senior Estonian Indoor Athletics Championships in the pole vault.

== Biography ==
She was active in sport aerobics and acrobatic gymnastics before focusing on athletics. She trains at the Gustav Adolf Gymnasium where she is coached by former Olympian Erki Nool. At the Estonian Youth Winter All-Around Championships in January 2023, she won the silver medal with 3,257 points in the U16 pentathlon.

In February 2024, she won the pole vault at the Estonian Indoor Athletics Championships with a successful clearance of 3.90 metres. She gained her first international experience in 2024 when she finished fifth in the pole vault at the 2024 European Athletics U18 Championships in Banská Bystrica, Slovakia, with a jump of 4.10 metres. She subsequently competed for Estonia in the pole vault at the 2024 World Athletics U20 Championships in Lima, Peru, but did not qualify for the final.

In February 2025, she cleared 4.10 metres to retain her senior national Estonian Indoor Athletics Championships title in Tallinn. In June 2025 at the Estonian Athletics Cup, she improved her personal best multiple times in the women's pole vault, clearing 4.25, 4.30, 4.35, before setting a new Estonian under-20 record in the pole vault when she cleared 4.41 metres, in Tartu. The following month, she set a new world under-18 best at the 2025 European Youth Summer Olympic Festival in Skopje, North Macedonia, with 4.52m to beat the previous best mark of 4.51m set by American Amanda Moll in 2022. That month, she was selected for the 2025 European Athletics U20 Championships in Tampere where she made a first time clearance of 4.10 metres to qualify for the final. In September 2025, she was nominated for the European Athletics female rising star award.

Moser won the pole vault clearing 4.30 metres at the Estonian Indoor Championships in February 2026, in Tallinn. In August 2026, she competed at the 2026 European Athletics Championships in Birmingham, England.
