= Alice Pagliarini =

Italian sprinter (born 2006)

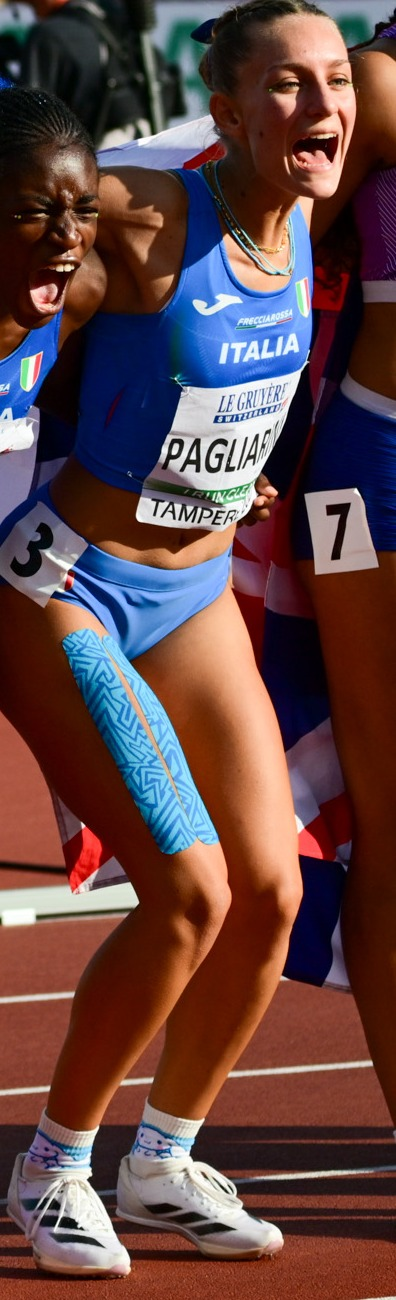

Personal information
- Nationality: Italian
- Born: 1 March 2006 (age 20)

Sport
- Sport: Athletics
- Event: Sprinting
Medal record
Women's athletics
Representing Italy
Mediterranean Games
Gold medal – first place	2026 Taranto	4 × 100 m mixed relay
European U20 Championships
Gold medal – first place	2025 Tampere	4x100 m relay
European U18 Championships
Silver medal – second place	2022 Jerusalem	Relay medley
European Youth Olympic Festival
Gold medal – first place	2022 Banská Bystrica	100m
Gold medal – first place	2022 Banská Bystrica	Medley relay
Silver medal – second place	2023 Maribor	100m
Silver medal – second place	2023 Maribor	Medley relay

Alice Pagliarini (born 1 March 2006) is an Italian sprinter.

== Early and personal life ==
She is from Fano in the Marche region of Italy. Her brother Francesco also competes as a sprinter. They are both coached by their father Andrea Pagliarini, who is himself a former sprinter. She joined the Gruppi Sportivi Fiamme Gialle in 2024.

== Career ==
In 2021, she set a new Italian U16 record running the 80m in 9.71 seconds (+1.6). She won a silver medal in the medley relay at the 2022 European Athletics U18 Championships in Jerusalem, Israel. Also in 2022, she participated in the 2022 European Youth Olympic Festival in Banská Bystrica, Slovakia, winning two gold medals; in the Swedish relay team and the 100 metres.

In January 2023, she set a new Italian under-18 best for the 60 metres indoors, running 7.38 seconds. The following month, she won the Italian under-18 indoor championships over 60 metres and 200 metres, in the 200 metres she moved to second on the Italian U18 all-time list indoors. In July 2023, she won two silver medals at the 2023 European Youth Olympic Festival in Maribor, Slovenia, winning her two medals in the same events as the previous year, finishing behind Miia Ott in the 100 metres.

In January 2024, she improved her personal best indoors over 60 metres to 7.36 seconds whilst competing in Ancona. After missing a large part of the 2024 season through injury, she returned the following year and won the Italian junior titles over both 100 metres and 200 metres. In 2025 she also made her debut with the senior Italian national team at the 2025 World Athletics Relays in Guangzhou, China running the inaugural 4x100m mixed relay.

That summer, she placed fourth in the 100m at the 2025 European Athletics U20 Championships in Tampere, Finland, and won the gold medal with the women’s 4x100 metres relay team at the championships. She was subsequently selected for the Italian team for the 2025 World Athletics Championships in Tokyo, Japan.

In May 2026, she ran at the 2026 World Athletics Relays in the women's 4 × 100 metres relay in Gaborone, Botswana. In August, She competed in the women's 4 × 100 metres relay at the 2026 European Athletics Championships in Birmingham, England.
