= Emmanuel Kiprono =

Kenyan long-distance runner

Personal information
- Born: 25 December 2008 (age 17)

Sport
- Sport: Athletics
- Events: Long distance running, Cross country running
Medal record
Men's athletics
Representing Kenya
World U20 Championships
Gold medal – first place	2026 Eugene	3000m
African U18 Championships
Gold medal – first place	2025 Abeokuta	3000m
World Cross Country Championships
Gold medal – first place	2026 Tallahassee	U20 team
Silver medal – second place	2026 Tallahassee	U20 race

Emmanuel Kiprono (born 25 December 2008) is a Kenyan long-distance and cross country runner.

== Biography ==
Kiprono was runner-up to Kevin Kiprop in the 3000 metres at the U18 Kenyan African Championships Trials in 2025. He then won the 3000 metres at the 2025 African U18 Championships in Nigeria, with Kiprop winning bronze.

Kiprono won the Kapsokwony Athletics Kenya Cross Country U20 race in September 2025 running the 8 km course in 24:01.7 to finish ahead of Edwin Elkana with Andrew Alamisi in third. In October 2025, Kiprono also became junior Kenyan cross country champion, running as a member of team North Rift, finishing ahead of Frankline Kibet. He was subsequently selected for the U20 race at the 2026 World Athletics Cross Country Championships in Tallahassee, where he won team gold with Kenya and individual silver, behind his compatriot Frankline Kibet.

In April 2026, Kiprono won the U20 3000m at the Kip Keino Classic before winning over 3000 metres in 7:35.40 at the Kenyan U20 Trials in May. He was selected to represent his country at the 2026 World Athletics U20 Championships, winning the 3000 m gold medal in 7:28.28, close to 20 seconds ahead of Alois Abraham of France. The time was a championship record, and only 0.09 seconds outside Yomif Kejelcha's world U20 record from 2016.
