= Emily Simpson =

British athlete (born 2000)

Personal information
- Nationality: British
- Born: 18 February 2000 (age 26)

Sport
- Sport: Athletics
- Event: Middle distance running

Achievements and titles
- Personal bests: 800m: 2:01.09 (Watford, 2025); 1500m: 4:10.83 (Manchester, 2026; Indoor; 800m: 2:02.72 (Sheffield, 2026; 1500m: 4:19.31 (Birmingham, 2025)

Emily Simpson (born 18 February 2000) is a British middle-distance runner. She was runner-up over 800 metres at the 2026 British Indoor Athletics Championships.

== Early life ==
From Sheffield, she was educated at Westfield School in the city before attending Sheffield Hallam University.

== Career ==
Simpson is a member of the City of Sheffield and Dearne Athletics Club. In February 2019, she finished third over 800 metres at the British Universities and Colleges Sport (BUCS) indoor championships.

She ran a personal best for the 800 metres of 2:01.09 at the British Milers Club Grand Prix in Watford in July 2025. On 2 August, she qualified for the final of the 800 metres at the 2025 UK Athletics Championships in Birmingham, placing sixth in the overall. Later that month, she ran the women’s 1500m A race at the BMC Trafford Grand Prix in a new personal best of 4:10.83.

Simpson opened her 2026 indoor season with an indoor personal best over 800 metres in Sheffield, running 2:02.76. On 31 January, she ran 2:02.66 finishing runner-up to Lucy Armitage at EAP Glasgow. She was a finalist at the 2026 British Indoor Athletics Championships in Birmingham on 14 February 2026, running a 2:01.43 to place second overall behind Isabelle Boffey, coming from fourth place to second on the final straight to finish ahead of Shaikira King.
