= 2026 World Athletics U20 Championships – Women's 800 metres =

Women's 800 metres at the 2026 World Athletics U20 Championships
- Venue: Hayward Field
- Dates: 5 August (Round 1); 7 August (Semi-finals); 8 August (Final)
- Competitors: 43
- Winning time: 2:03.03

Medalists
gold medal	Živa Remic	Slovenia
silver medal	Ioulianna Roussou	Greece
bronze medal	Shaikira King	Great Britain

The women's 800 metres at the 2026 World Athletics U20 Championships was held at Hayward Field in Eugene, United States on 5, 7 and 8 August 2026.

== Records ==
U20 standing records prior to the 2026 World Athletics U20 Championships were as follows:

Record	Athlete & Nationality	Mark	Location	Date
World U20 Record	Pamela Jelimo (KEN)	1:54.01	Zürich, Switzerland	29 August 2008
Championship Record	Roisin Willis (USA)	1:59.13	Cali, Colombia	3 August 2022
World U20 Leading	Saida Tsehaye (ETH)	1:57.96	Oordegem, Belgium	1 August 2026

== Results ==
=== Round 1 ===
Round 1 took place in the morning session on 5 August 2026. First 5 of each heat (Q) plus 2 fastest times (q) qualify to the semi-finals.

==== Heat 1 ====
Place	Athlete	Nation	Time	Notes
1	Živa Remic	Slovenia	2:09.86	Q
2	Róża Olchawa	Poland	2:10.02	Q
3	Zeynep Özkara	Turkey	2:10.11	Q
4	Caterina Caligiana	Italy	2:10.16	Q
5	Derartu Shibiru	Ethiopia	2:10.28	Q
6	Saoirse Fitzgerald	Ireland	2:10.73	
7	Helena Guttke	Germany	2:11.26	
8	Ana Poljak	Croatia	2:12.56	
9	Júlia Benianová	Slovakia	2:12.75	

==== Heat 2 ====
Place	Athlete	Nation	Time	Notes
1	Rin Kubo	Japan	2:03.27	Q
2	Kevongaye Fowler	Jamaica	2:04.31	Q, PB
3	Giulia Macchi	Italy	2:04.44	Q
4	Emma Fryga	Australia	2:05.08	Q
5	Leni Hirt	Germany	2:07.63	Q
6	Andrea Steynberg	South Africa	2:13.29	
7	Yue Deng	China	2:13.47	
8	Poppy Healy	New Zealand	2:14.41	
—	Nancy Jepngetich	Kenya	DQ	TR17.5.1

==== Heat 3 ====
Place	Athlete	Nation	Time	Notes
1	Ioulianna Roussou	Greece	2:04.47	Q
2	Ivy Boothroyd	Australia	2:04.67	Q
3	Paige Sheppard	United States	2:06.40	Q
4	Anaise Meier	France	2:06.42	Q
5	Mary MacLean	Canada	2:06.47	Q
6	Olivia Solomon	Guyana	2:06.55	q, NU20R
7	Gaja Kovačec	Slovenia	2:08.38	q
8	Pamela Nicol Barreto	Ecuador	2:08.71	SB
9	Tharushi Abhisheka Mahadura	Sri Lanka	2:16.58	

==== Heat 4 ====
Place	Athlete	Nation	Time	Notes
1	Habtam Gebeyehu	Ethiopia	2:04.66	Q
2	Fiona von Flüe	Switzerland	2:06.40	Q
3	Carise van Rooyen	South Africa	2:06.52	Q
4	Pia Langton	Ireland	2:07.06	Q
5	Lena Pajęcka	Poland	2:09.64	Q
6	Naomi Marjorie Cesar	Philippines	2:13.19	
7	Elena Ban	Croatia	2:13.31	
—	Boh Ritchie	New Zealand	DNF	

==== Heat 5 ====
Place	Athlete	Nation	Time	Notes
1	Shaikira King	Great Britain	2:06.02	Q
2	Ellie Barada	United States	2:06.57	Q
3	Noée Wipfli	Switzerland	2:06.74	Q
4	Chloe Symon	Canada	2:07.06	Q
5	Marion Jepchumba	Kenya	2:07.69	Q
6	Maud de Jong	Netherlands	2:09.16	
7	Aurora Bertelsen	Chile	2:12.94	
8	Ashlyn Simmons	Barbados	2:16.64	

=== Semi-finals ===
Semi-finals took place in the afternoon session on 7 August 2026.

==== Heat 1 ====
Place	Athlete	Nation	Time	Notes
1	Živa Remic	Slovenia	2:04.32	Q
2	Róża Olchawa	Poland	2:04.34	Q
3	Rin Kubo	Japan	2:04.37	Q
4	Ivy Boothroyd	Australia	2:04.57	
5	Ellie Barada	United States	2:05.06	
6	Noée Wipfli	Switzerland	2:06.97	
7	Caterina Caligiana	Italy	2:07.34	
8	Kevongaye Fowler	Jamaica	2:08.11	
9	Leni Hirt	Germany	2:08.22	

==== Heat 2 ====
Place	Athlete	Nation	Time	Notes
1	Paige Sheppard	United States	2:01.97	Q
2	Ioulianna Roussou	Greece	2:02.95	Q
3	Derartu Shibiru	Ethiopia	2:03.41	Q, PB
4	Fiona von Flüe	Switzerland	2:04.04	
5	Carise van Rooyen	South Africa	2:04.94	
6	Giulia Macchi	Italy	2:05.29	
7	Emma Fryga	Australia	2:05.55	
8	Mary MacLean	Canada	2:05.78	
9	Marion Jepchumba	Kenya	2:06.88	

==== Heat 3 ====
Place	Athlete	Nation	Time	Notes
1	Shaikira King	Great Britain	2:02.93	Q
2	Habtam Gebeyehu	Ethiopia	2:02.99	Q
3	Chloe Symon	Canada	2:03.22	Q
4	Zeynep Özkara	Turkey	2:04.58	
5	Olivia Solomon	Guyana	2:06.15	
6	Anaise Meier	France	2:07.02	
7	Pia Langton	Ireland	2:07.41	
8	Gaja Kovačec	Slovenia	2:07.50	
9	Lena Pajęcka	Poland	2:07.87	

=== Final ===
The final took in the afternoon session on 8 August 2026.

Place	Athlete	Nation	Time	Notes
1st place, gold medalist(s)	Živa Remic	Slovenia	2:03.03	
2nd place, silver medalist(s)	Ioulianna Roussou	Greece	2:03.08	
3rd place, bronze medalist(s)	Shaikira King	Great Britain	2:03.52	
4	Habtam Gebeyehu	Ethiopia	2:03.99	
5	Rin Kubo	Japan	2:04.00	
6	Chloe Symon	Canada	2:04.24	
7	Derartu Shibiru	Ethiopia	2:04.81	
8	Paige Sheppard	United States	2:06.94	
9	Róża Olchawa	Poland	2:10.64	
