= Tomáš Horák (sprinter) =

Czech athlete (born 2008)

Personal information
- Born: 5 March 2008 (age 18) Brno, Czech Republic

Sport
- Sport: Athletics
- Event: Sprint

Achievements and titles
- Personal bests: 400m: 46.12 (Ostrava, 2025); Indoors; 400m: 45.64 (Ostrava, 2026) AU20R
Medal record
Men's athletics
Representing Czech Republic
European U20 Championships
Gold medal – first place	2025 Tampere	4x400 m relay
European Youth Olympic Festival
Gold medal – first place	2025 Skopje	400m
Gold medal – first place	2025 Skopje	Medley relay
Silver medal – second place	2025 Skopje	4x400m mixed

Tomáš Horák (born 5 March 2008) is a Czech sprinter. In 2026, he set indoor European U20 records over 200 metres and 400 metres. He won the 200 metres at the 2026 Czech Indoor Athletics Championships and became the youngest ever world indoor 400 m finalist at the 2026 World Athletics Indoor Championships.

== Biography ==
Horák was born on 5 March 2008 in Brno. He is a member of the athletic club VSK Univerzita Brno. In 2025, he was a gold medalist over 400 metres at the 2025 European Youth Olympic Festival (EYOF) in Skopje in 46.60 seconds. He also won the gold medal in the medley relay and the silver medal in the mixed 4 × 400 metres relay at the 2025 European Youth Olympic Festival. It was his international debut for the Czech Republic, having missed the European U18 Championship in Banská Bystrica the year before with a late injury. That summer, he set a personal best of 46.12 seconds for the 400 metres. he was a finalist in the individual 400 metres and a gold medalist in the men's 4 x 400 metres at the 2025 European Athletics U20 Championships in Tampere, Finland, running a Czech national U20 record of 3:05.79 alongside Michal Rada, Ondřej Loupal and Lukáš Mareš.

In January 2026, he ran 46.36 seconds for the 400 metres indoors in Prague, improving by 41 hundredths the junior Czech record set by Matěj Krsek in 2019. In February 2026, he set a new indoor European under-20 record for the 400 metres, winning the Czech Indoor U20 Championships in 45.64 seconds. The time moved him to second on the Czech indoor all-time list behind Pavel Maslák. On 1 March, he twice broke the European under-20 indoor record for the 200 metres in winning the Czech Indoor Athletics Championships, breaking the previous record of William Trulsson in the heats, prior to running 20.65 seconds in the final. The time moved him to joint-second on the Czech indoor all-time list behind Pavel Maslák.

Competing at the 2026 World Athletics Indoor Championships in Toruń, Poland, Horák became the youngest ever world indoor 400m finalist at the age of 18 years and 13 days. In the final he finished fifth overall in 45.70 seconds.
