= Zaya Akins =

American athlete (born 2005)

Personal information
- Nationality: American
- Born: 30 August 2005 (age 20)

Sport
- Sport: Athletics
- Event: Sprint

Achievements and titles
- Personal best: 400m: 51.33 (2024)
Medal record
Women's athletics
Representing United States
World U20 Championships
Gold medal – first place	2022 Cali	4x400 m relay
Bronze medal – third place	2024 Lima	400m
Gold medal – first place	2024 Lima	4×400 m relay

Zaya Akins (born 30 August 2005) is an American sprinter.

== Career ==
She won a gold medal as part of the USA 4 × 400 m relay team at the 2022 World Athletics U20 Championships in Cali, Colombia.

She missed the 2023 season through injury, but bounced back to win the USATF U20 Championships in Eugene, Oregon with a time of 51.81 seconds in June 2024,

She reached the final of the 400 metres at the 2024 World Athletics U20 Championships in Lima, Peru. In the final she ran 52.00 seconds flat to win the bronze medal. She also won gold in the 4 × 400 m relay at the Championships.

== NCAA ==
Zaya Akins is an NCAA Champion, 3-time SEC Champion, 5-time All-SEC honoree as a student-athlete at the University of South Carolina in Columbia.

representing South Carolina Gamecocks
2025	NCAA Division I Outdoor Track and Field Championships	4 × 100 m relay	42.40	(silver) 2nd
2025	NCAA Division I Outdoor Track and Field Championships	4 × 400 m relay	DNS	9th
2025	NCAA Division I Outdoor Track and Field Championships	400 m	51.40	10th
2025	Southeastern Conference Outdoor Track and Field Championships	4 × 100 m relay	42.75	(gold) 1st
2025	Southeastern Conference Outdoor Track and Field Championships	4 × 400 m relay	3:24.26	(gold) 1st
2025	Southeastern Conference Outdoor Track and Field Championships	400 m	52.33	6th
2025	NCAA Division I Indoor Track and Field Championships	4 × 400 m relay	3:47.74	10th
2025	NCAA Division I Indoor Track and Field Championships	400 m	51.39	5th
2025	Southeastern Conference Indoor Track and Field Championships	200 m	23.12	7th
2025	Southeastern Conference Indoor Track and Field Championships	4 × 400 m relay	3:27.95	(silver) 2nd
2025	Southeastern Conference Indoor Track and Field Championships	400 m	51.39	5th
2024	NCAA Division I Outdoor Track and Field Championships	4 × 100 m relay	42.63	(bronze) 3rd
2024	NCAA Division I Outdoor Track and Field Championships	4 × 400 m relay	3:24.86	6th
2024	NCAA Division I Outdoor Track and Field Championships	400 m	52.36	20th
2024	Southeastern Conference Outdoor Track and Field Championships	4 × 100 m relay	DQ	10th
2024	Southeastern Conference Outdoor Track and Field Championships	4 × 400 m relay	3:25.02	(silver) 2nd
2024	Southeastern Conference Outdoor Track and Field Championships	400 m	51.98	12th
2024	NCAA Division I Indoor Track and Field Championships	4 × 400 m relay	3:26.20	(gold) 1st
2024	Southeastern Conference Indoor Track and Field Championships	4 × 400 m relay	3:26.05	(gold) 1st
2024	Southeastern Conference Indoor Track and Field Championships	400 m	52.78	13th

== Early life ==
She attended Raytown South High School in Missouri, before attending University of South Carolina. She won eight state high school championships, breaking the Missouri state record in both the 200 and 400 metres.

== Personal life ==
Her father Eli was a high school sprinter. She has two screws in her left knee after breaking her leg playing volleyball. She has been trained by Olympic runner Muna Lee.
