= Jakub Marek (sprinter) =

Czech athlete (born 2009)

Personal information
- Born: 25 January 2009 (age 17)

Sport
- Sport: Athletics
- Event: Sprint
Medal record
Men's athletics
Representing Czech Republic
World U20 Championships
Silver medal – second place	2026 Eugene	4x400 m mixed
European U20 Championships
Gold medal – first place	2025 Tampere	4x400 m relay
European U18 Championships
Gold medal – first place	2026 Rieti	Medley relay
Silver medal – second place	2026 Rieti	400m
European Youth Olympic Festival
Gold medal – first place	2025 Skopje	Medley relay
Silver medal – second place	2025 Skopje	4x400m mixed

Jakub Marek (born 25 January 2009) is a Czech sprinter.

== Biography ==
From Přímbra, he studies at the Sports Gymnasium in Plzeň and is a member of AC Domažlice.

Marek was part of Czech Republic's gold medal-winning 4 × 400 m relay team at the 2025 European Athletics U20 Championships in Tampere. He won a gold medal in the medley relay and then, running alongside Anna Cerovská, Alžběta Anna Podzimková and Tomáš Horák, he won the silver medal in the mixed 4 × 400 metres relay at the 2025 European Youth Olympic Festival.

Competing at the 2026 European Athletics U18 Championships in Rieti in July 2026, he progressed through the preliminary heats as one of the strongest performers prior to winning the silver medal in the final in a new personal best of 46.59 seconds behind Sebastián Karp, and ahead of Czech teammate Lukáš Bednařík. Alongside Bednařík, he was part of the Czech men's team which won the 1000 metres medley relay gold medal on the final day of the championships. On 5 August, he won a silver medal in the mixed 4 x 400 metres at the 2026 World Athletics U20 Championships.
