= Diego Nappi =

Italian athlete (born 2007)

Personal information
- Nationality: Italian
- Born: 10 August 2007 (age 18)

Sport
- Sport: Athletics
- Event: Sprint

Achievements and titles
- Personal bests: 60m: 6.80 (Ancona, 2025); 100m: 12.00 (Lucca, 2025); 200m: 20.76 (Tampere, 2025)
Medal record
Men's athletics
Representing Italy
European U20 Championships
| Gold medal – first place | 2025 Tampere | 200 m |
European U18 Championships
| Gold medal – first place | 2024 Banská Bystrica | 200 m |

Diego Nappi (born 10 August 2007) is an Italian sprinter. He won the 2024 European Athletics U18 Championships and 2025 European Athletics U20 Championships titles over 200 metres.

== Career ==
From Sardinia, he is a member of Porto Torres AC. He ran a personal best 20.79 seconds for the 200 metres in Molfetta in July 2024, bettering the Italian U18 record held previously by Filippo Tortu. He was a gold medalist over 200 metres at the 2024 European Athletics U18 Championships in Banská Bystrica, in 20.81 seconds, a championship record.

In August 2025, he won the gold medal over 200 metres for the Italian team at the 2025 European Athletics U20 Championships in Tampere, Finland, winning ahead of Pedro Afonso of Portugal with 20.77 into a strong headwind (-2.9). This came after he won his heat in 20.95 seconds (+0.01) and his semi-final in a personal best 20.76 seconds (+1.9).

In August 2026, he was a semi-finalist in the 200 metres at the 2026 World Athletics U20 Championships in Eugene, Oregon.
