= Robert Daly (sprinter) =

Irish sprinter

Personal information
- Born: 26 January 1978 (age 48) Dublin, Ireland

Sport
- Sport: Track and field
Medal record
Representing Ireland
World Indoor Championships
Bronze medal – third place	2004 Budapest	4x400m relay

Robert Martin Daly (born 26 January 1978) is an Irish sprinter who specializes in the 400 metres.

Daly won the bronze medal in 4 x 400 metres relay at the 2004 World Indoor Championships, together with teammates Gary Ryan, David Gillick and David McCarthy.

His personal best time is 45.98 seconds, was achieved in July 2004 in Dublin.

== Personal life ==
His daughter Molly Daly is also an international sprinter for Ireland.
