= Shaikira King =

British athlete (born 2008)

Personal information
- Nationality: British
- Born: 14 July 2008 (age 18)

Sport
- Sport: Athletics
- Event: Middle distance running

Achievements and titles
- Personal bests: 800m: 2:00.95 (Watford, 2025); 1500m: 4:11.78 (Birmingham, 2025); Indoor; 800m: 2:01.49 (Birmingham, 2026); Mile: 4:43.23 (London, 2024)
Medal record
Women's athletics
Representing Great Britain
World U20 Championships
Bronze medal – third place	2026 Eugene	800 m
European U18 Championships
Silver medal – second place	2024 Banská Bystrica	800 m

Shaikira King (born 14 July 2008) is a British middle-distance runner.

== Early and personal life ==
From Loughborough, in Leicestershire, she has a sister, Indienne, who also competes at athletics. They both attend Ratcliffe College. In 2021, both sisters won gold for the first time at the English Schools Championships, with Shaikira winning the junior 1500m title. Both sisters won gold again at the 2022 English Schools Championship.

== Career ==
=== 2023 ===
In June 2023, King set a new personal best for 800m, running 2:04.47 in Loughborough. In July 2023, in the heats of the senior girls' 800m at the English Schools Championships, and still aged 14 years-old, King took the 46-year-old championship record previously held by Jo White, before being edged out in the final by 16 year-old Phoebe Gill.

In 2023 she won the under-17 English National Cross Country title, and was the first in her age group at the Liverpool Cross Challenge in November 2023. Her finish in joint third place overall would have qualified her for the British U20 team for the European Cross Country Championships, but she was still too young to compete in the event.

=== 2024 ===
In April 2024, King broke the UK age-15 800m record with 2:02.60 in Gillingham, Kent, which also put her third all-time among UK under-17s list. King won the silver medal in the final of the 800 metres at the 2024 European Athletics U18 Championships in Banská Bystrica, Slovakia. In October 2024, she became the youngest athlete in the UK to secure a contract with sports brand Nike.

=== 2025 ===
In February 2025, she won the England Indoors U20 title over 800 metres, setting a championship record time of 2:04.34. Later that month, she finished third in the final of the 800 metres at the 2025 British Indoor Athletics Championships, in Birmingham. In May 2025, she won the 800 metres at the Loughborough International running for England. The following month, she ran 4:11.78 for the 1500 metres at the BMC Grand Prix in Birmingham, and broke Phoebe Gill's UK age-16 record for the distance. On 25 July, she ran a championship record by over a second to win the England Athletics U20 Championships title over 800 metres in 2:02.86. She was named in the British team for the 800 metres at the 2025 European Athletics U20 Championships in Tampere, winning her semi-final in 2:04.48, and later led at the bell in the final, before finishing fifth in 2:03.60. In October 2025, she was included on British Athletics Olympic Futures Programme for 2025/26.

=== 2026 ===
King opened her 2026 indoor season with an 800m personal best of 2:04.14 Antequera, Spain. On 31 January she ran 2:04.44 to place third overall at EAP Glasgow, having had a gun to tape win in her heat. The following month, she won the England Athletics U20 title over 800 metres, running 2:03.99 to meet the standard for the 2026 U20 World Championships. On 15 February 2026, King was a finalist at the 2026 British Indoor Athletics Championships in Birmingham on 14 February 2026, placing third overall behind Isabelle Boffey and Emily Simpson in 2:01.49. In May, she won the 800 m at the Loughborough International. In June, she reached the final of the 800 metres at the 2026 British Championships. In July, King finished third behind Phoebe Gill and Lyla Belshaw in the 800 metres final at the 2026 England Athletics U20 Championships.

King was selected as part of the Great Britain team to compete at the 2026 World Athletics U20 Championships, qualifying for the final with the second fastest time from the semi-finals and winning the bronze medal in the final. It was Britain's first medal at the championships in the distance since Jess Judd in 2012. In October 2026, she was retained on the 2026/27 Olympic Futures Programme awarded by UK Athletics. The following month, she was nominated for British U20 Female Athlete of the Year by Athletics Weekly.
