= Dianna Proctor =

Canadian athlete (born 2005)

Personal information
- Nationality: Canadian
- Born: 25 April 2005 (age 21) Edmonton, Alberta

Sport
- Sport: Athletics
- Event: 400 metres

Achievements and titles
- Personal best(s): 200m: 23.30 (2024); 400m: 51.98 (2024)
Medal record
Women's athletics
Representing Canada
World Relays
Bronze medal – third place	2026 Gaborone	4×400 m relay
World U20 Championships
Silver medal – second place	2024 Lima	400 m
Bronze medal – third place	2024 Lima	4×100 m relay
Junior Pan American Games
Gold medal – first place	2025 Asunción	400 m
Gold medal – first place	2025 Asunción	4×400 m relay

Dianna Proctor (born 25 April 2005) is a Canadian sprinter. She was a silver medallist over 400 metres at the 2024 World Athletics U20 Championships.

== Education ==
Proctor was educated at Strathcona High School is Edmonton, Alberta before attending the University of Guelph in Ontario.

== Career ==
She ran a 51.98 personal best to win the silver medal at the 2024 World Athletics U20 Championships in the 400 metres. She also competed in the 200 metres at the Championships, qualifying for the semi-final, and the women's 4x100 metres relay, in which the Canadian team qualified for the final. She also won bronze in the 4 × 100 m relay at the Championships.

She competed at the 2025 World Athletics Relays in China in the Mixed 4 × 400 metres relay in May 2025. She won two gold medals at the 2025 Pan American Junior Games in Asunción, Paraguay in August 2025, setting a new championship record of 51.97 seconds in the 400 metres and also anchoring the Canadian team to gold in the women's 4 x 400 metres relay. She was subsequently selected for the 2025 World Athletics Championships in Tokyo, Japan, where she ran in the women's 400 metres and the women's 4 x 400 metres relay.

Competing in January 2026 in Albuquerque, Proctor lowered the long-standing Canadian under-23 best time for the indoors 300 metres, held for 43 years by Angela Bailey. The time of 37.05 seconds also set a new school record for the University of Guelph, ahead of the previous best time of Zoe Sherar. She was selected as part of the Canadian team for the 2026 World Athletics Relays in Botswana, and ran as part of the Canadian women's 4 x 400 metres team which won their heat on the opening day. The following day, as the women’s 4 x 400 m team won the bronze medal, Proctor switched to the mixed 4 x 400 m, anchoring the team to a national record of 3:12.43. The following month, she placed second over 400 metres at the 2026 Canadian Championships.
