= Aldin Ćatović =

Serbian athlete (born 2007)

Personal information
- Nationality: Serbian
- Born: 6 April 2007 (age 19)

Sport
- Sport: Athletics
- Event: Middle distance

Achievements and titles
- Personal bests: 800m: 1:51.61 (2024); 1500m: 3:41.24 (2024) NU18R; 3000m: 8:07.03 (2024)
Medal record
Men's athletics
Representing SER
European U18 Championships
Gold medal – first place	2024 Banska Bystrica	3000m
Silver medal – second place	2024 Banska Bystrica	1500m
European Youth Olympic Festival
Gold medal – first place	2023 Maribor	3000m

Aldin Ćatović (born 6 April 2007) is a Serbian middle- and long-distance runner. He is a multiple time Serbian national champion. In 2024, he won gold and silver medals at the European Athletics U18 Championships, over 3000 metres and 1500 metres, respectively.

== Biography ==
He is a member of Novi Pazar Athletics Club, where he is coached by Rifar Ziljkić. In February 2023, he won his first senior national indoor title, winning over 1500 metres at the Serbian Indoor Athletics Championships. In July 2023, he won the 3000 metres race at the 2023 European Youth Summer Olympic Festival in Maribor, Slovenia. That month he helped Novi Pazar win the Inter-Municipal Youth Sports Games (MOSI) in Kolašin, and was the most successful individual male athlete.

In February 2024, he won the Serbian senior national indoor title over 800 metres and retained his 1500m national indoors title at the same championships. He then won senior Serbian national outdoor titles over 800 metres and 1500 metres in June 2024.

He won the gold medal in the 3000 metres at the 2024 European Athletics U18 Championships in Banská Bystrica, Slovakia, setting a championship record time of 8:07.03. He won the silver medal in the 1500 metres at the same championships. In November 2024, he was given the best young athlete award for 2024 by the Balkan Athletics Federation. He competed at the 2024 European Cross Country Championships, in Antalya, Turkey in December 2024 but had to withdraw mid-race.

He competed at the 2025 European Athletics U20 Championships in Tampere, Finland, winning his 3000 metres heat in 8:17.71. He finished second in the men's U20 race at the Balkan Cross Country Championships in Romania, on 8 November 2025. In January 2026, he set a new Serbian under-20 indoor record over 1500 metres of 3:47.40 in Belgrade. He was selected for the 2026 World Athletics Indoor Championships in Poland in March 2026, running in the 1500 metres without advancing to the final.

== Personal life ==
Of Bosniak descent, Ćatović is from Novi Pazar in the Raška District of southwestern Serbia.
