= 2025 European Throwing Cup =

Athletics competition

- Location: Nicosia, Cyprus
- Dates: 15–16 March
- Competitors: 302 from 39 nations

The 2025 European Throwing Cup was held from 15 to 16 March 2025 in Nicosia, Cyprus.

== Results ==
WL - the best result on the world lists in 2024	EL - the best result on European lists in 2025	CR - European Cup record
NR - national record	PB - personal record	SB - the best result of the season

=== Men ===
==== Seniors ====
Event	Gold		Silver		Bronze	
Shot put	Nick Ponzio; Italy	20.60	Silas Ristl; Germany	20.27 PB	Jesper Arbinge; Sweden	19.93
Discus throw	Henrik Janssen; Germany	65.77 EL, SB	Kristjan Čeh; Slovenia	65.69 SB	Martynas Alekna; Lithuania	63.96 SB
Hammer throw	Bence Halász; Hungary	78.75 SB	Volodymyr Myslyvčuk; Czech Republic	77.98 PB	Thomas Mardal; Norway	77.43 SB
Javelin Throw	Ioannis Kiriazis; Greece	84.38 EL	Giovanni Frattini; Italy	82.78 SB	Cyprian Mrzygłód; Poland	82.46 SB

==== U23 ====
Event	Gold		Silver		Bronze	
Shot put	Tizian Lauria; Germany	19.55 SB	Jarno van Daalen; Netherlands	19.54 PB	Miika Lahtonen; Finland	18.70
Discus throw	Steven Richter; Germany	60.72	Marcos Moreno; Spain	59.47	Jarno van Daalen; Netherlands	57.79 SB
Hammer throw	Iosef Kesides; Cyprus	72.96 EU23L, NU23R	Miklós Csekö; Hungary	71.54 PB	Ioannis Korakidis; Greece	71.08 SB
Javelin Throw	Nick Thumm; Germany	77.09 PB	Lucio Claudio Visca; Italy	74.39 PB	Oisín Joyce; Ireland	73.86 SB

=== Women ===
==== Seniors ====
Event	Gold		Silver		Bronze	
Shot put	Jessica Inchude; Portugal	19.21 PB	Katharina Maisch; Germany	18.58	María Belén Toimil; Spain	17.37
Discus throw	Vanessa Kamga; Sweden	63.25 WL	Liliana Cá; Portugal	62.66 SB	Marike Steinacker; Germany	61.57 SB
Hammer throw	Silja Kosonen; Finland	77.07 WL	Rose Loga; France	72.87	Sara Fantini; Italy	72.37 SB
Javelin Throw	Adriana Vilagoš; Serbia	66.88 WL	Sigrid Borge; Norway	62.62 SB	Sara Kolak; Croatia	59.66 SB

==== U23 ====
Event	Gold		Silver		Bronze	
Shot put	Pınar Akyol; Turkey	16.15 =SB	Anna Musci; Italy	16.12 PB	Maria Rafailidou; Greece	15.74 SB
Discus throw	Marie-Josée Bovele-Linaka; France	57.37 EU23L, PB	Anna Gavigan; Ireland	53.91 PB	Lea Bork; Germany	53.65
Hammer throw	Nicola Tuthill; Ireland	69.74 EU23L	Thea Löfman; Sweden	69.06 SB	Aileen Kuhn; Germany	67.25 SB
Javelin Throw	Petra Sičaková; Czech Republic	60.26 EU23L, SB	Mirja Lukas; Germany	58.91 PB	Rabiye Çiçek; Turkey	52.41 PB

== Medal table ==
* Host nation (Cyprus)

Rank	Nation	Gold	Silver	Bronze	Total
1	Germany	4	3	3	10
2	Italy	1	3	1	5
3	Ireland	1	1	1	3
3	Sweden	1	1	1	3
5	Czech Republic	1	1	0	2
5	France	1	1	0	2
5	Hungary	1	1	0	2
5	Portugal	1	1	0	2
9	Greece	1	0	2	3
10	Finland	1	0	1	2
10	Turkey	1	0	1	2
12	Cyprus*	1	0	0	1
12	Serbia	1	0	0	1
14	Netherlands	0	1	1	2
14	Norway	0	1	1	2
14	Spain	0	1	1	2
17	Slovenia	0	1	0	1
18	Croatia	0	0	1	1
18	Lithuania	0	0	1	1
18	Poland	0	0	1	1
Totals (20 entries)		16	16	16	48
