= Miia Ott =

Estonian athlete

Mia Ott
Personal information
- Born: 19 April 2007 (age 19)

Sport
- Sport: Athletics
- Event: Sprint

Achievements and titles
- Personal bests: 60m: 7.45s (2024); 100m: 11.44s (2024); 200m: 24.21s (2024)
Medal record
Women's athletics
Representing Estonia
European U18 Championships
Bronze medal – third place	2024 Banská Bystrica	100m
European Youth Olympic Festival
Gold medal – first place	2023 Maribor	100m
Bronze medal – third place	2023 Maribor	200m

Miia Ott (born 19 April 2007) is an Estonian sprinter. She was a medalist in the 100 metres at the 2024 European Athletics U18 Championships and ran for Estonia at the 2024 World Athletics Relays and at the 2024 European Athletics Championships.

== Career ==
She became interested in athletics after attending a sports day for young children in Rakvere. After trying a number of events she eventually focused on sprinting. She later became coached by Maris Mägi.

=== 2023 ===
Ott won gold in the 100 metres and bronze in the 200 metres at the 2023 European Youth Summer Olympic Festival in Maribor, Slovenia, at the age of 16 year-old.

She made the 100m final at the 2023 European Athletics U20 Championships in Jerusalem, Israel, running an Estonian U20 record time of 11.53 seconds. She finished in sixth place in the 100m final. She led off the Estonian 4 x 100 metres relay team which set a national senior record of 44.21 at the European Athletics Team Championships in Silesia, Poland in June 2023, running alongside Marii Kivikas, Diana Suumann, and Kreete Verlin.

=== 2024 ===
In January 2024, she lowered her own Estonian youth record for the 60 metres, running 7.45 seconds in Tampere. She ran as part of the Estonian 4 × 100 m relay team at the 2024 World Relays Championships in Nassau, Bahamas in May 2024. In June 2024, she competed for Estonia in the 4 × 100 m relay at the 2024 European Athletics Championships in Rome.

In July 2024, she ran an Estonian U18, U20, and U23 record of 11.44 seconds at the 2024 European Athletics U18 Championships, winning the bronze medal in the final of the 100 metres at the Championships in Banská Bystrica, Slovakia.

=== 2025 ===
In June 2025, she was part of the Estonian women's 4 x 100 metres relay team which set a new national record whilst competing at the 2025 European Athletics Team Championships Second Division in Maribor, running 43.98 seconds alongside Anna Maria Millend, Kreete Verlin and Ann Marii Kivikas.

=== 2026 ===
Ott placed third over 60 metres at the Estonian Indoor Championships in February 2026, running 7.46 seconds. The following day, she placed second to Ann Marii Kivikas in the 200 metres final.
