= Rabiye Çiçek =

Turkish athlete (born 2007)

Personal information
- Born: 12 April 2007 (age 19)

Sport
- Sport: Athletics
- Event: Javelin throw

Achievements and titles
- Personal bests: Javelin: 55.95 m (Tampere, 2025)
Medal record
Women's athletics
Representing Turkey
European Throwing Cup
Bronze medal – third place	2025 Nicosia	U23 Javelin throw
European U18 Championships
Bronze medal – third place	2024 Banská Bystrica	Javelin

Rabiye Çiçek (born 12 April 2007) is a Turkish javelin thrower. She won bronze medals at both the 2024 European Athletics U18 Championships and the 2025 European U23 Throwing Cup.

== Career ==
At the 2024 Balkan U18 Championships in Maribor, she was runner-up to Vita Barbić in the 500g javelin as Barbić threw a European U18 leading throw. She won a bronze medal in the 500g javelin throw at the 2024 European Athletics U18 Championships in Banská Bystrica, Slovakia with a personal best throw of 54.52 metres.

In March 2025, she won a bronze medal in the U23 women's javelin at the 2025 European Throwing Cup in Nicosia, Cyprus with a throw of 52.41 metres. She threw a personal best 55.95 metres to qualify for the final of the javelin throw at the 2025 European Athletics U20 Championships in Tampere, Finland, before placing fourth overall in the final.

== Personal life ==
She is from Mersin and is a student at Aydın Adnan Menderes University in Aydın, Turkey.
