= 2026 World Athletics U20 Championships – Men's 3000 metres =

Men's 3000 metres at the 2026 World Athletics U20 Championships
- Venue: Hayward Field
- Dates: 7 August (Final)
- Competitors: 22 from 15 nations
- Winning time: 7:28.28

Medalists
| gold medal | Emmanuel Kiprono | Kenya |
| silver medal | Aloïs Abraham | France |
| bronze medal | Ojiro Honda | Japan |

The men's 3000 metres at the 2026 World Athletics U20 Championships was held at Hayward Field in Eugene, United States on 7 August 2026.

== Records ==
U20 standing records prior to the 2026 World Athletics U20 Championships were as follows:

| Record | Athlete & Nationality | Mark | Location | Date |
|---|---|---|---|---|
| World U20 Record | Yomif Kejelcha (ETH) | 7:28.19 | Paris, France | 27 August 2016 |
| Championship Record | Tadese Worku (ETH) | 7:42.09 | Nairobi, Kenya | 18 August 2021 |
| World U20 Leading | Emmanuel Kiprono (KEN) | 7:35.4 | Nairobi, Kenya | 22 May 2026 |

== Results ==
=== Final ===
The final took place in the afternoon session on 7 August 2026.

| Place | Athlete | Nation | Time | Notes |
|---|---|---|---|---|
| 1st place, gold medalist(s) | Emmanuel Kiprono | Kenya | 7:28.28 | CR, WU20L |
| 2nd place, silver medalist(s) | Aloïs Abraham | France | 7:47.79 | |
| 3rd place, bronze medalist(s) | Ojiro Honda | Japan | 7:48.49 | NU20R |
| 4 | Liam Conway | Great Britain | 7:50.10 | PB |
| 5 | Aleksi Ahlfors | Finland | 7:50.56 | PB |
| 6 | Chien Tzu-chieh | Chinese Taipei | 7:51.18 | NU20R |
| 7 | Ilyes Druez | Belgium | 7:51.67 | PB |
| 8 | Sebastian Lörstad | Sweden | 7:51.94(.935) | PB |
| 9 | Edwin Elkana | Kenya | 7:51.94(.937) | PB |
| 10 | Owen Powell | United States | 7:53.35 | PB |
| 11 | Haruki Niizuma | Japan | 7:54.30 | PB |
| 12 | Dan Kipyeko | Uganda | 7:55.58 | |
| 13 | Michael Clark | Great Britain | 7:57.43 | PB |
| 14 | Alejandro Ibañez | Spain | 7:58.95 | PB |
| 15 | Sawyer LeBlanc | Canada | 8:00.02 | PB |
| 16 | Nadim Mameche | France | 8:01.28 | |
| 17 | Magnus Øyen | Norway | 8:01.74 | |
| 18 | Noah Bontrager | United States | 8:09.10 | |
| 19 | Charles Barrett | Australia | 8:10.34 | |
| 20 | Abraham Cherotich | Uganda | 8:11.62 | |
| 21 | Matthew McLachlan | Australia | 8:20.15 | |
| 22 | Sebastian Smed Grønkjær | Denmark | 8:31.20 | |
