= Thea Brown (athlete) =

British athlete

Personal information
- Nationality: British
- Born: 19 March 2007 (age 19)

Sport
- Sport: Athletics
- Event: Multi-event

Achievements and titles
- Personal bests: Heptathlon: 5826 (Eugene, 2026); Pentathlon 4320 (Glasgow, 2026)
Medal record
Women's athletics
Representing Great Britain
European U20 Championships
Silver medal – second place	2025 Tampere	Long jump
European U18 Championships
Silver medal – second place	2024 Banska Bystrica	Heptathlon
Bronze medal – third place	2024 Banska Bystrica	Medley Relay
Representing England
Commonwealth Youth Games
Silver medal – second place	2023 Trinbago	100 m hurdles
Silver medal – second place	2023 Trinbago	Mixed 4 × 100 m relay

Thea Brown (born 19 March 2007) is a British track and field athlete who competes as a multi-event athlete. She won the British title in pentathlon in 2026, and placed second in the high jump and third in the 60 metres hurdles at the 2026 British Indoor Athletics Championships.

== Biography ==
A Sale Harriers athlete, Brown won the 2022 English Schools heptathlon and Schools International indoor pentathlon titles.

=== 2023 ===
In February 2023, at the English national junior championships, she recorded a personal best in the long jump with a jump of 5.94 metres to win the U17 title. She ran a new national U17 record time of 8.39 seconds to win the 60 m hurdles title.

In July 2023, she was selected team captain for the 2023 Commonwealth Youth Games held in Trinidad and Tobago. She won a silver medal as part of the English 4 × 100 m relay team. She also won silver at the games in the 100 m hurdles. In September 2023, she moved to fourth place on the British all-time list for the U17 heptathlon with a score of 5147, moving ahead of international athletes Jade O'Dowda and Katarina Johnson-Thompson on the list.

=== 2024 ===
On 17 February 2024, she qualified for the final of the 60 m hurdles at the senior UK national indoors championships in Birmingham, with a personal best time of 8.26 seconds. In the final she finished fifth in a time of 8.35 seconds.

In May 2024 she finished second to Katarina Johnson-Thompson in the high jump at the Loughborough International, clearing a height of 1.83 metres. She ran a time of 13.33 seconds to qualify for the final of the 100 m hurdles at the 2024 British Athletics Championships in Manchester on 29 June 2024. She placed fourth in the final.

In July 2024, she won silver in the heptathlon with a personal best of 5807 points at the 2024 European Athletics U18 Championships in Slovakia. She also won a bronze medal as part of the medley relay at the championships. She competed at the 2024 World Athletics U20 Championships in Lima, Peru, reaching the semi-final of the 100 metres hurdles. In October 2024, she was nominated by Athletics Weekly for best British female junior.

=== 2025 ===
She jumped a personal best 6.36 metres during the heptathlon at the International Meeting of Arona, part of the World Athletics Combined Events Tour, in June 2025.

She was named in the British team for the long jump at the 2025 European Athletics U20 Championships in Tampere, after a season hampered by hamstring and ankle issues. After qualifying for the final with one jump, a personal best 6.42 metres, Brown increased her personal best again in the final and won the silver medal with 6.44 metres. In October 2025, she was named on the British Athletics Olympic Futures Programme for 2025/26. She was again nominated for British under-20 female athlete of the year by Athletics Weekly in November 2025.

=== 2026 ===
In February 2026, Brown won the England Athletics U20 title over 60 metres hurdles, running 8.22 seconds in Sheffield. The following week, Brown placed third in the final of the 60 metres hurdles at the 2026 British Indoor Athletics Championships in Birmingham, again running 8.22 seconds, and finishing behind Abigail Pawlett and Emma Nwofor. The next day, Brown returned to the championships an jumped 1.81 metres to place second in the high jump competition. On 1 March in Glasgow, Brown won the pentathlon at the British Indoor Combined Events Championship with a winning score of 4320 points. In May 2026, Brown won the British Universities and Colleges Sport (BUCS) Outdoor Championships title over 100 metres hurdles. On 4 July, Brown won the heptathlon at the England Athletics U20 Championships with all events completed within 24 hours. She set a personal best of 5826 points in heptathlon competing as part of the Great Britain team at the 2026 World Athletics U20 Championships in Eugene, United States, to move to fifth on the UK all-time list, and set personal bests in individual events such as the javelin, shot put, and 100 metres hurdles.

In October 2026, she was retained on the 2026/27 Olympic Futures Programme awarded by UK Athletics. The following month, she was again nominated for British U20 Female Athlete of the Year by Athletics Weekly.
