= Athletics at the 1993 European Youth Summer Olympic Days =

The athletics competition at the 1993 European Youth Summer Olympic Days was held from 5 to 8 July. The events took place in Valkenswaard, Netherlands. Boys and girls born 1976 or 1977 or later participated 24 track and field events, divided equally between the sexes with the exception of 2000 metres steeplechase and pole vault for boys but not girls.

== Medal summary ==
=== Men ===
Event	Gold		Silver		Bronze	
100 metres	Plamen Slavchev (BUL)	10.84	Luis Sabeter (ESP)	10.95	Cédric Grand (SUI)	11.01
200 metres	Patrick De Clercq (BEL)	21.76	Attila Bella (HUN)	21.86	Jean David Bastien (FRA)	21.90
400 metres	Nicos Christofi (CYP)	48.61	Jacek Bocian (POL)	48.73	Mark Ponting (GBR)	48.74
800 metres	Wojciech Kałdowski (POL)	1:51.90	James Nolan (IRL)	1:53.45	Andrey Korzun (BLR)	1:53.85
1500 metres	Reyes Estévez (ESP)	3:50.97	Gunther Methot (BEL)	3:53.40	Elias Tsakiris (GRE)	3:53.83
110 metres hurdles (wind: +2.6 m/s)	James Archampong (GBR)	13.92 w	Balàzs Magyar (HUN)	14.20 w	Francisco Ruíz (ESP)	14.26 w
2000 metres steeplechase	Antonio Álvarez (ESP)	5:42.22	Ramses Bekkenk (NED)	5:47.51	Marius Marinau (ROU)	5:50.55
4 × 100 m relay	France (FRA)	41.69	Greece (GRE)	41.76	Italy (ITA)	42.09
High jump	Attila Zsivoczky (HUN)	2.21 m	Jordi Rofes (ESP)	2.21 m	Tomáš Ort (CZE)	2.12 m
Pole vault	Yevgeniy Smiryagin (RUS)	5.00 m	Gregoris Tsaramanidis (GRE)	4.60 m	Mathieu Baudais (FRA)	4.60 m
Long jump	Olivier Borderan (FRA)	7.57 m	Roman Shchurenko (UKR)	7.31 m	Chavdar Iliev (BUL)	7.27 m
Shot put	Costantino Cattaneo (ITA)	18.53 m	Vyacheslav Kurchanskiy (BLR)	18.14 m	Andrzej Krawczyk (POL)	18.06 m
Javelin throw	Tomáš Halva (SVK)	65.26 m	Norbert Borbély (HUN)	63.78 m	Didier Richard (FRA)	62.80 m

=== Women ===
Event	Gold		Silver		Bronze	
100 metres	Frédérique Bangué (FRA)	11.88	Elvira Dzhabarova (AZE)	12.05	Steluta Tuta (ROU)	12.06
200 metres	Ionela Târlea (ROU)	23.71	Manuela Caddeo (ITA)	24.62	Sinead Dudgeon (GBR)	24.76
400 metres	Mariana Florea (ROU)	52.76	Brigita Langerholc (SLO)	55.04	María Sonia Hernáiz (ESP)	55.99
800 metres	Lyudmila Voronicheva (RUS)	2:05.35	Emilie Neveu (FRA)	2:05.65	Dori García (ESP)	2:08.26
1500 metres	Nuria Fernández (ESP)	4:25.63	Mioara Cosuleanu (ROU)	4:26.87	Ine Claus (BEL)	4:28.46
100 metres hurdles	Aurelia Trywiańska (POL)	13.63	Catherine Brilland (FRA)	13.87	Olena Ovcharova (UKR)	14.01
4 × 100 m relay	Spain (ESP)	46.96	Romania (ROM)	46.99	Italy (ITA)	47.21
High jump	Kajsa Bergqvist (SWE)	1.84 m	Olga Kaliturina (RUS)	1.78 m	Elisa Bozzola (ITA)	1.78 m
Long jump	Marie-Véronique Mazarin (FRA)	6.27 m	Magdalena Khristova (BUL)	6.22 m	Cristina Nicolau (ROU)	6.13 m
Shot put	Corrie de Bruin (NED)	19.12 m	Olga Ryabinkina (RUS)	16.97 m	Volha Tsander (BLR)	16.21 m
Javelin throw	Angelikí Tsiolakoúdi (GRE)	52.60 m	Edyta Blauciak (POL)	48.22 m	Elizabeta Ranđelović (SLO)	46.22 m
