= Živa Remic =

Slovenian middle-distance runner (born 2009)

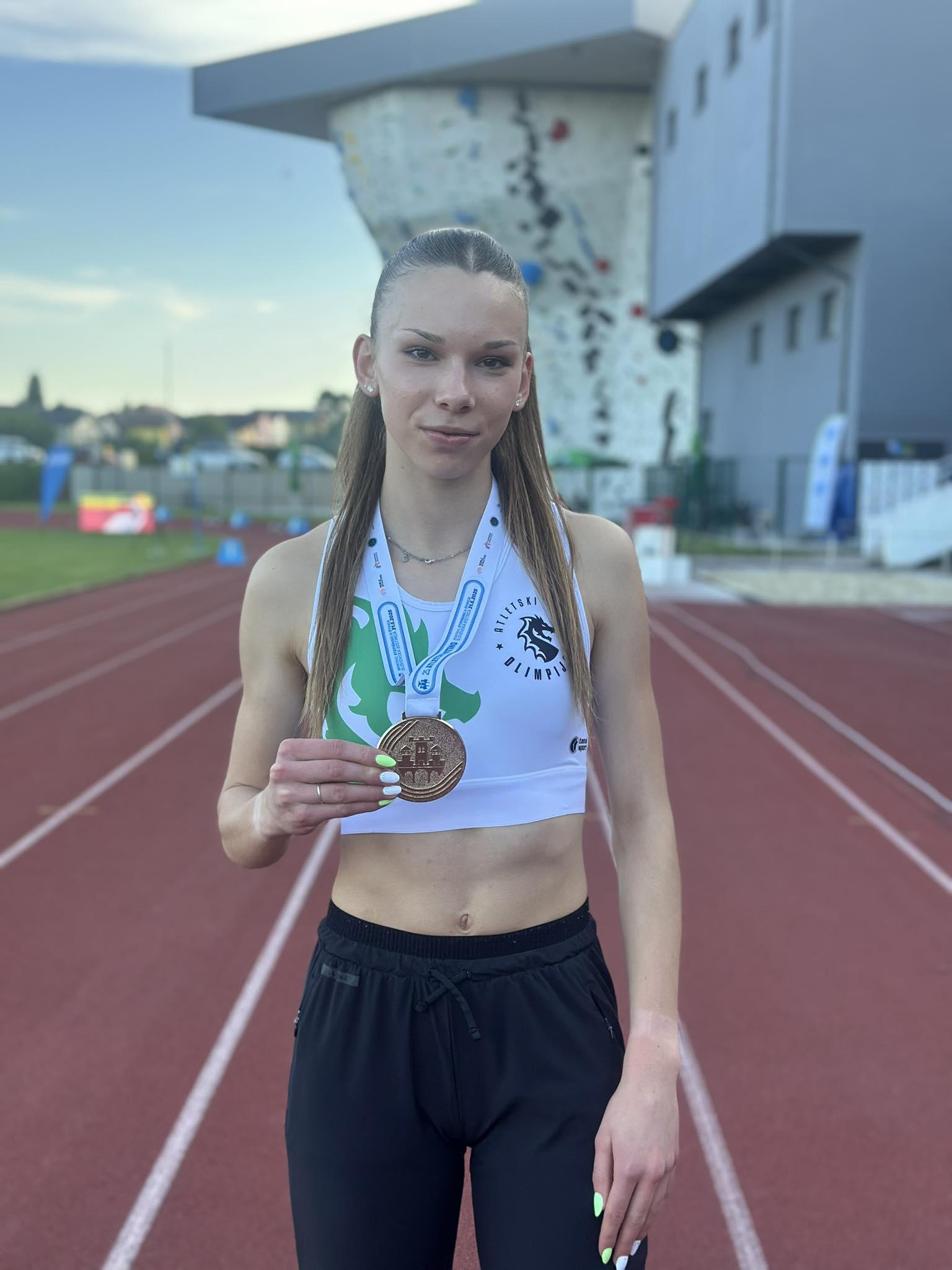
- Živa Remic

Personal information
- Born: 23 August 2009 (age 17)

Sport
- Sport: Athletics
- Event: Middle-distance running

Achievements and titles
- Personal bests: 400 m 52.21 (Skopje, 2025) NU20R; 800 m 1:59.64 (Pfungstadt, 2026) NU20R; Indoors; 800 m 2:00.73i (Ostrava, 2026) AU18R
Medal record
Women's athletics
Representing Slovenia
World U20 Championships
Gold medal – first place	2026 Eugene	800 m
European U20 Championships
Silver medal – second place	2025 Tampere	800 m
European U18 Championships
Gold medal – first place	2026 Rieti	800 m
European Youth Olympic Festival
Gold medal – first place	2025 Skopje	400 m

Živa Remic (born 23 August 2009) is a Slovenian middle-distance runner. In February 2026, she ran the European indoor under-18 best time for the 800 metres and won her first senior title at the Slovenian Indoor Championships. She won gold medals over 800 metres at the 2026 World U20 Championships and 2026 European U18 Championships as a 16-year-old.

Remic won the silver medal as a 15-year-old at the 2025 European Athletics U20 Championships and won the 2025 European Youth Olympic Festival over 400 metres.

== Biography ==
A member of Olimpija Athletic Club and from Grosuplje, she is coached by of Gregor Grad. Remic attended Bežigrad Grammar School in Ljubljana, Slovenia. In 2024, Remic set a Slovenian under-18 (and under-16) best time in the 800 metres with 2:05.88. That year, she also set the Slovenian best times in those age groups over 600 metres and 1000 metres.

In June 2025, she improved her personal best by more than two and a half seconds to 2:03.19 for the 800 metres. That month, she was the youngest member of the Slovenian team to compete at the 2025 European Athletics Team Championships Second Division in Maribor, placing sixth in the 400 metres, in a personal best time of 52.23 seconds. On 22 July 2025, Remic won the 400 metres title at the European Youth Olympic Festival in Skopje in 52.21 seconds.

As a 15-year-old, Remic won the silver medal in the 800 metres, finishing nine hundredths of a second behind Jana Becker of Germany at the 2025 European Athletics U20 Championships in Tampere in 2:01.76. The time was only by 24 hundredths of a second outside the Slovenian under-20 record. That year, Remic signed a contract with sportswear brand Puma.

Competing indoors at the Czech Golden Gala in Ostrava on 3 February 2026, Remic ran the 800 metres in 2:00.73, setting a European under-18 indoor best time, improving the previous best, set in 2013 by Aníta Hinriksdóttir, and placing Remic second on the world U18 all-time list. The time broke six Slovenian records, including the outright under-23 record held previously by Jolanda Čeplak. The time also met the automatic qualification standard for the 2026 World Indoor Championships. The following month, she won the senior Slovenian Indoor Athletics Championships over 800 metres in 2:01.45.

In June 2026, competing at the Merck Laufgala Pfungstadt in Germany, Remic finished second in the 800 metres behind Majtie Kolberg of Germany, running 1:59.64. This performance set a new personal best and marked her first time running under two minutes in the event. In July, at the 2026 European Athletics U18 Championships in Rieti, Italy, Remic set a new championship record in the semifinals of the 800m with 2:04.19 before winning the gold medal the following day with a solo run of 2:03.77. Still aged 16, Remic competed at the 2026 World Athletics U20 Championships in the United States, winning the gold medal in the final in 2:03.03 on 8 August. She was nominated for European Athletics Women’s Rising Star for 2026.
