= Filip Toul =

Czech athlete (born 2007)

Personal information
- Nationality: Czech
- Born: 2 August 2007 (age 19) České Budějovice
- Height: 187 cm (6 ft 2 in)
- Weight: 78 kg (172 lb)

Sport
- Sport: Athletics
- Event: Middle distance

Achievements and titles
- Personal bests: 800m: 1:47,98 (2026); 1500m: 3:38.62 (2026) NU20R; Mile: 3:55.68 (2026); 3000m 7:58.71 (2026)NU20R
Medal record
Men's athletics
Representing CZE
European U18 Championships
Gold medal – first place	2024 Banska Bystrica	1500m

Filip Toul (born 2 August 2007) is a Czech middle distance runner. He is the Czech national under-18 record holder over 1500 metres and 3000 metres, and under-20 record holder over 1500 metres. He won the gold medal in the 1500 metres at the 2024 European Athletics U18 Championships.

== Biography ==
He is a member of SK Čtyři Dvory, in České Budějovice, where his coaches include Hakim Saleh and Pavel Brlica.

In February 2024, he finished in second place at the Czech Indoor Athletics Championships in Ostrava, running a time of 3:53.27. In May 2024, in Domažlice he ran a new Czech junior national record for the 1500 metres, improving Jakub Davidík's five-year-old record by four tenths of seconds, by running a time of 3:45.92.

In June 2024, he ran 3:40.98 for the 1500 metres at the age of 16 years-old, which placed him as the third fastest European under-18 in history behind Dutch runner Niels Laros and Jakob Ingebrigtsen of Norway. That month, he won the Czech under-18 title over 800 metres in Ostrava. He won gold in the 1500 metres at the 2024 European Athletics U18 Championships in Banská Bystrica, Slovakia.

He finished third in the Czech junior cross country championships in November 2024. He was subsequently selected for the European Cross Country Championships in December 2024 in Istanbul, Turkey.

Toul set a new Czech junior record in the one-mile run in Ostrava in February 2025 at the Czech Gala, running 4:00.13, a time which is waiting ratification from World Athletics as a European under-20 record. Toul placed third in the 1500 metres at the senior Czech Indoor Championships in Ostrava, running 3:43.14.

In June 2026, he set a national U20 record over the mile at the Ostrava Golden Spike, finishing 13th in 3:55.68, also improving his 1500 metres personal best in the race with 3:38.62.
