= Phoebe Gill =

English athlete

Personal information
- Nationality: English
- Born: 27 April 2007 (age 19) St Albans, Hertfordshire, England
- Height: 1.77 m (5 ft 10 in)

Sport
- Sport: Athletics
- Event: 800m
- Club: St Albans AC

Achievements and titles
- Personal bests: 400m: 53.3 (St. Albans, 2024); 800m: 1:57.86 (Belfast, 2024); 1500m: 4:05.53 (Manchester, 2026); 1500m: 4:05.87 (Watford, 2024 - mixed gender)
Medal record
Women's athletics
Representing England
Commonwealth Youth Games
Gold medal – first place	2023 Trinbago	800 m

Phoebe Gill (born 27 April 2007) is a British track and field athlete who competes as a middle-distance runner. In 2023, she became the British under-17 record holder over both 800 metres and 1500 metres. On 30 June 2024 she won the British 800 metres title at the national championships. Phoebe also claimed the European Under-18 record holder for 800 metres in 2024.

== Early life ==
Gill is from St Albans in Hertfordshire. She was initially focused on swimming before turning her attentions towards athletics. She attended St George's School, Harpenden and became a member of St Albans Athletics Club at under-11 level.

== Career ==
=== 2022 ===
Coached by Deborah Steer at St Albans Athletic Club, Gill set the fifth fastest British U17 age group 800m time in May 2022, running 2:03.74 at the Watford Open Graded Meeting. This placed her ahead of Keely Hodgkinson at the same age and was the fastest by a British U17 athlete since Jessica Warner-Judd in 2011. In August 2022, Gill ran a 1500m time of 4:14.08 which became the fastest ever in the under-17 age group, ran in the UK.

=== 2023 ===
Gill won the English schools title over 800m in July 2023. In July 2023, Gill broke Warner-Judd's U17 British record for the 1500m, when she ran 4:11.96 at the BMC Watford Gold Standard meeting.

Gill was selected to represent England at the 2023 Commonwealth Youth Games held in Port of Spain, Trinidad and Tobago in August 2023. She clocked a time of 2:02:30 to win gold in the 800m, the fastest time by a British U17 female athlete since Jo White in 1977.

Racing in Britain again later in August 2023, she set a new British U17 record for the 800 metres, running 2:01.50 in Watford.

=== 2024 ===
On 1 January 2024, Gill took more than three seconds off of her indoor 400m personal best, running 54.82 in Lee Valley (mixed gender).

On 1 May 2024 (4 days after turning 17), Gill ran 4:05.87 at 1500m in a Watford Open Graded Meeting (mixed gender), improving her personal best by over 6 seconds. This ranked her as the 3rd fastest all-time Female U20 in the UK for 1500m, behind Zola Budd (3:59.96 - 30 August 1985) and Stephanie Twell (4:05.83 - 18 July 2008)

On 11 May 2024, Gill ran 1:57.86 at 800m in Belfast, to break the European Under-18 record of 1:59.65 set by East Germany’s Marion Geissler-Hübner 45 years previously. The time also met the qualifying standard for the 2024 Olympic Games and moved her to joint second place in 2024 world 800m ranking.

She was invited to run for Britain at the 2024 European Athletics Championships in June 2024 but declined, opting to study for her school exams instead. Later that month, she won the 800m title at the 2024 British Athletics Championships in Manchester. On 5 July 2024, she was named in the Great Britain team for the 2024 Summer Olympics where she came fourth in her semi-final in a time of 1:58.47 and did not advance to the final. In October 2024, she was nominated by Athletics Weekly for best British female junior.

=== 2025 ===
Gill opened 2025 with a 54.14 time for the 400m at the Lee Valley Open on 1 January 2025, an indoor 400m personal best. A few weeks later on 18 January at the same venue she recorded a time of 53.65, again a personal indoor best in the 400m. However, a fibula stress fracture caused Gill to miss the outdoor season. Gill joined the University of Edinburgh in 2025 to train as part of the Global Endurance Project, led by coach Mark Rowland.

=== 2026 ===
On her competitive return from injury, Gill won the 1500m at the British Milers’ Club Grand Prix, a World Athletics Continental Tour Challenger meeting, on 16 May 2026, running 4:05.53 for the victory, the second fastest time by a British U20 runner after Zola Budd. Gill placed fourth in 2:01.50 in her first 800m since the Paris Olympics, at the Irena Szewińska Memorial in Bydgoszcz, Poland on 29 May. Competing at the Boris Hanzekovic Memorial in Zagreb, a World Athletics Continental Tour Gold meeting, on 26 June, Gill had victory in the 800 metres, running 1:59.18 ahead of compatriot Isabelle Boffey. On 4 July, she won the 800 m final at the England Athletics U20 Championships in a Championships Best Performance of 2:00.49. In October 2026, she was moved up to the confirmation level in the 2026-27 Olympic World Class Programme awarded by UK Athletics.
