= Maria Rafailídou =

Greek athlete (born 2007)

Maria Rafailidou
Personal information
- Born: 29 January 2007 (age 19)

Sport
- Sport: Athletics
- Event: Shot put

Achievements and titles
- Personal best: Shot put:16.80m NU20R (2026)
Medal record
Women's athletics
Representing Greece
European Throwing Cup
| Bronze medal – third place | 2025 Nicosia | U23 Shot put |
European U20 Championships
| Gold medal – first place | 2025 Tampere | Shot put |
European U18 Championships
| Gold medal – first place | 2024 Banska Bystrica | Shot put |

Maria Rafailidou (born 29 January 2007) is a Greek shot putter. A European under-18 and under-20 champion, she won the senior Greek national title outdoors in 2025 and indoors in 2026.

== Biography ==
From Thessaloniki, she started in athletics in high school and is coached by her father who competed as a hammer thrower. Rafailidou won the gold medal at the 2024 European Athletics U18 Championships in Slovakia with world-leading under-18 throw of 18.46 metres. She won the bronze medal in the U23 category at the 2025 European Throwing Cup in Nicosia with 15.74 metres.

Having changed her technique from glide to rotational as she moved up the age-groups, Rafailidou won the gold medal at the 2025 European Athletics U20 Championships in Tampere with a third round throw of 16.16 metres. She also landed the second biggest throw of the competition with 15.85 in the fourth round. It marked Greece's first medal in women's shot put at the European under-20 level. That year, she won the senior Greek Athletics Championships. She won her first senior international medal with a silver-winning throw of 16.28 metres at the 2025 Balkan Athletics Championships.

In February 2026, she won another national title at the Greek Indoor Athletics Championships. In August, she competed at the 2026 European Athletics Championships in Birmingham, England, in the shot put.
