= 2024 European Athletics U18 Championships =

European athletics competition

4th European Athletics U18 Championships
- Dates: 18–21 July 2024
- Host city: Banská Bystrica, Slovakia
- Venue: Národný Atletický Štadión
- Level: U18
- Type: Outdoor
- Events: 40
- Participation: 1187 athletes from 48 nations

The 2024 European Athletics U18 Championships was the fourth edition of the biennial continental athletics competition for European athletes aged fifteen to seventeen. It was held in Banská Bystrica, Slovakia from 18 to 21 July at the Národný Atletický Štadión. A future edition has been awarded to Rieti for 2026.

== Medal summary ==
Legend

- CR (Championship Record), PB (Personal Best; =PB: repeat/reconfirm Personal Best), SB (Season Best), WU18L (World U18 Lead), EU18L (European U18 Lead), EU18B (European U18 Best Performance/Record), NU18B (National U18 Best Performance/Record)

=== Men ===
Event	Gold		Silver		Bronze	
100 metres	Jakob Kemminer; Germany	10.46	Joel Masters; Great Britain	10.51	Joel Ajayi; Great Britain	10.61
200 metres	Diego Nappi; Italy	20.81 CR	Ivano Bevanda; Sweden	21.17 PB	Joe Burke; Ireland	21.31 NU18B
400 metres	Stanisław Strzelecki; Poland	46.50 CR	Milan Klemenic; France	46.78 PB	Conor Kelly; Ireland	46.97 NU18B
800 metres	Matthew McKenna; Great Britain	1:52.91	Aaron Ceballos; Spain	1:53.21	Łukasz Zaczyk; Poland	1:53.60
1500 metres	Filip Toul; Czech Republic	3:54.77	Aldin Ćatović; Serbia	3:55.14	Alois Abraham; France	3:56.55
3000 metres	Aldin Ćatović; Serbia	8:07.03 CR	Vittore Simone Borromini; Italy	8:09.01 PB	Sebastian Lörstad; Sweden	8:11.71 NU18B
110 metres hurdles	Kyan Escalona; Italy	13.22 EU18L	Lucas Domergue; France	13.34	Hristiyan Kabasov; Bulgaria	13.47
400 metres hurdles	Michal Rada; Czech Republic	49.42 EU18B	Marek Váňa; Czech Republic	51.12 PB	Tommaso Ardizzone; Italy	51.38 NU18B
2000 metres steeplechase	Bakr El Asri; Spain	5:46.79	Adam Červinka; Czech Republic	5:47.71 PB	Jakob Rödel; Germany	5:47.77 PB
Medley relay	Poland; Nikodem Dymiński; Jakub Foremny; Bartłomiej Adamczyk; Stanisław Strzelecki	1:51.62 CR	Germany; Jakob Kemminer; Louis Schuster; Jannis Dettner; Milan Stadler	1:51.82 NU18B	Italy; Fabrizio Caporusso; Daniele Leonardo Inzoli; Tommaso Carfagna; Daniele Salemi	1:52.02 NU18B
5000 m walk	Alessio Coppola; Italy	21:01.44	Séamus Clarke; Ireland	21:05.70 NU18B	Nicolo' Vidal; Italy	21:11.87 PB
High jump	Svante Svensson; Sweden	2.09 PB	Antoine Antczak; France	2.08 PB	Vuk Šolaja; Serbia	2.08 PB
Pole vault	Mathias Urbanczyk; Belgium	5.10 PB	Nikita Mirkin; Israel / PB Henri Apri; Estonia	5.00	No	No
Long jump	Remi Mourie; France	7.72 PB	Áron Hajdu; Hungary	7.58 NU18B	Daniele Leonardo Inzoli; Italy	7.54
Triple jump	Emmanuel Idinna; France	15.85 EU18L	Francesco Efeosa Crotti; Italy	15.49 PB	Benedikt Maurer; Germany	15.11 PB
Shot put	Ștefan Alexandru Ciobanu; Romania	19.99	Ludvig Ellgren; Sweden	19.19 PB	Jan Ferina; Croatia	19.04
Discus throw	Jakub Rodziak; Poland	64.21 WU18L	Yaroslav Lystopad; Ukraine	60.93	Cian Crampton; Ireland	60.55 NU18B
Hammer throw	Thomas Williams; Ireland	73.95	Dimo Andreev; Bulgaria	72.49	Magno Llopis; Spain	72.48 PB
Javelin throw	Pietro Villa; Italy	76.04 NU18B	Roch Krukowski; Poland	74.84	Teemu Simoinen; Finland	73.24
Decathlon	Tristan Konso; Estonia	7549 pts	Liam Belo Da Silva; Sweden	7318 pts	Kilian Trochain; France	7290 pts

* Indicates that the athlete participated only in the preliminary heats and also received a medal as part of the relay.

=== Women ===
Event	Gold		Silver		Bronze	
100 metres	Radina Velichkova; Bulgaria	11.46 NU18B	Shade Laporal; France	11.54 PB	Miia Ott; Estonia	11.62
200 metres	Elisa Valensin; Italy	23.09 CR	Margherita Castellani; Italy	23.35 PB	Pauline Richter; Germany	23.50 PB
400 metres	Anastazja Kuś; Poland	51.89 CR	Kara Dacosta; Great Britain	52.60 PB	Madelief van Leur; Netherlands	53.19
800 metres	Adéla Holubová; Czech Republic	2:04.23 CR	Shaikira King; Great Britain	2:04.29	Carmen Cernjul; Sweden	2:04.52 PB
1500 metres	Lyla Belshaw; Great Britain	4:13.01 CR	Isla McGowan; Great Britain	4:14.78 PB	Wilma Anna Bekkemoen Torbiørnsson; Norway	4:16.45
3000 metres	Katie Pye; Great Britain	9:20.25 SB	Julia Ehrle; Germany	9:20.31 PB	Olivia Forrest; Great Britain	9:21.66 PB
100 metres hurdles	Laura Frličková; Slovakia	12.97	Zofia Rojek; Poland	13.33	Auxane Kingue; France	13.37 PB
400 metres hurdles	Nina Radová; Czech Republic	58.00 CR	Eva Barbarić; Croatia	58.85 PB	Lalie Pouzancre-Hoyer; France	59.07 PB
2000 metres steeplechase	Astrid Cecilie Berntsen; Norway	6:32.11 PB	Ema Berková; Czech Republic	6:34.63 PB	Nadia Soto; Spain	6:35.04
Medley relay	Italy; Viola Canovi; Margherita Castellani; Laura Frattaroli; Elisa Valensin	2:05.23 EU18B	Poland; Oliwia Kasprzak; Aleksandra Jeż; Zofia Tomczyk; Anastazja Kuś	2:05.54 NU18B	Great Britain; Nell Desir; Thea Brown; Shiloh Omotosho; Kara Dacosta	2:05.90 NU18B
5000 m walk	Serena di Fabio; Italy	21:50.80 CR	Alessia Cristina Pop; Romania	22:03.11 NU18B	Petra Kusá; Slovakia	23:49.22 PB
High jump	Lilianna Bátori; Hungary	1.84	Aitana Alonso; Spain	1.81 PB	Yman Ossie Tchiengue; France	1.81 PB
Pole vault	Anastasia Boumpoulidi; Greece	4.20	Embla Matilde Njerve; Norway	4.15 NU18B	Beate Pott; Sweden	4.15 PB
Long jump	Evelina Olsson; Sweden	6.35 PB	Joana Fiodorovaitė; Lithuania	6.23 PB	Radina Velichkova; Bulgaria	6.16 =PB
Triple jump	Brenda Džiliana Apsīte; Latvia	13.18	Melina Zaragka; Greece	13.10	Elisa Valenti; Italy	12.99
Shot put	Maria Rafailidou; Greece	18.46	Anhelina Shepel; Ukraine	17.09	Anastasia Mihaela Andreadi; Greece	16.70
Discus throw	Nadjela Wepiwe; Germany	51.61	Andrea Njimi Tankeu Djeudji; Spain	50.01	Vita Barbić; Croatia	49.50 PB
Hammer throw	Clara Hegemann; Germany	72.93 WU18L	Polina Dzerozhynska; Ukraine	72.92 PB	Nova Kienast; Germany	71.72
Javelin throw	Vita Barbić; Croatia	61.07 CR	Konstanze Irlinger; Germany	57.64 NU18B	Rabiye Çiçek; Turkey	54.52 PB
Heptathlon	Enni Virjonen; Finland	6151 pts	Thea Brown; Great Britain	5807 pts	Maria Schnemilich; Germany	5732 pts

* Indicates that the athlete participated only in the preliminary heats and also received a medal as part of the relay.

== Medal table ==
* Host nation (Slovakia)

Rank	Nation	Gold	Silver	Bronze	Total
1	Italy (ITA)	7	3	5	15
2	Poland (POL)	4	3	1	8
3	Czech Republic (CZE)	4	3	0	7
4	Great Britain (GBR)	3	5	3	11
5	Germany (GER)	3	3	5	11
6	France (FRA)	2	4	5	11
7	Sweden (SWE)	2	3	3	8
8	Greece (GRE)	2	1	1	4
9	Spain (ESP)	1	3	2	6
10	Ireland (IRL)	1	1	3	5
11	Bulgaria (BUL)	1	1	2	4
11	Croatia (CRO)	1	1	2	4
13	Estonia (EST)	1	1	1	3
13	Norway (NOR)	1	1	1	3
13	Serbia (SRB)	1	1	1	3
16	Hungary (HUN)	1	1	0	2
16	Romania (ROU)	1	1	0	2
18	Finland (FIN)	1	0	1	2
18	Slovakia (SVK)*	1	0	1	2
20	Belgium (BEL)	1	0	0	1
20	Latvia (LAT)	1	0	0	1
22	Ukraine (UKR)	0	3	0	3
23	Israel (ISR)	0	1	0	1
23	Lithuania (LTU)	0	1	0	1
25	Netherlands (NED)	0	0	1	1
25	Turkey (TUR)	0	0	1	1
Totals (26 entries)		40	41	39	120

== Participating nations ==
1187 competitors (611 boys and 576 girls) from 48 countries competed.

- Andorra (1)
- Armenia (2)
- Austria (14)
- Azerbaijan (1)
- Belgium (17)
- Bosnia and Herzegovina (4)
- Bulgaria (19)
- Croatia (19)
- Cyprus (12)
- Czech Republic (29)
- Denmark (12)
- Estonia (21)
- Finland (46)
- France (43)
- Georgia (3)
- Germany (82)
- Gibraltar (1)
- Great Britain (40)
- Greece (52)
- Hungary (51)
- Iceland (3)
- Ireland (35)
- Israel (12)
- Italy (71)
- Kosovo (2)
- Latvia (31)
- Liechtenstein (2)
- Lithuania (12)
- Luxembourg (12)
- Malta (5)
- Moldova (6)
- Monaco (1)
- Montenegro (1)
- Netherlands (24)
- North Macedonia (2)
- Norway (28)
- Poland (70)
- Portugal (30)
- Romania (28)
- San Marino (1)
- Serbia (24)
- Slovakia (41) (host)
- Slovenia (39)
- Spain (67)
- Sweden (47)
- Switzerland (57)
- Turkey (24)
- Ukraine (43)
