= Kara Dacosta =

British athlete

Personal information
- Nationality: British
- Born: 18 April 2007 (age 19)

Sport
- Sport: Athletics
- Event: Sprint

Achievements and titles
- Personal best(s): 200m: 24.61 (Fayetteville, 2025); 400m: 52.60 (Banska Bystrica, 2024)
Medal record
Women's athletics
Representing Great Britain
World U20 Championships
Bronze medal – third place	2024 Lima	4x400 m relay
European U18 Championships
Silver medal – second place	2024 Banska Bystrica	400m
Bronze medal – third place	2024 Banska Bystrica	Medley Relay

Kara Dacosta (born 18 April 2007) is a British sprinter.

== Career ==
She was a silver medalist in the 400 metres at the 2024 European Athletics U18 Championships in Slovakia running 52.60 seconds in the final. She also won a bronze medal as part of the medley relay at the championships, in Banská Bystrica. She was a bronze medalist in the 4 x 400 metres relay at the 2024 World Athletics U20 Championships in Lima, Peru.

== Personal life ==
From Essex, Dacosta later attended Darwen Vale High School, and trained at Trafford athletics club and Blackburn Harriers. In 2025, she signed with the University of Arkansas in the United States.
