= Athletics at the 2025 European Youth Summer Olympic Festival =

- Venue: Toše Proeski Arena
- Date: 21–26 July

Athletics at the 2025 European Youth Summer Olympic Festival was held at the Toše Proeski Arena in Skopje, North Macedonia, from 21 to 26 July 2025.

== Medal table ==
* Host nation (North Macedonia)

Rank	Nation	Gold	Silver	Bronze	Total
1	Italy	8	5	1	14
2	France	5	5	1	11
3	Poland	3	1	4	8
4	Greece	2	4	5	11
5	Switzerland	2	4	3	9
6	Sweden	2	3	1	6
7	Czech Republic	2	2	2	6
8	Germany	2	1	1	4
9	Belgium	2	0	2	4
10	Norway	2	0	0	2
11	Spain	1	5	4	10
12	Hungary	1	3	1	5
13	Finland	1	2	0	3
14	Ukraine	1	1	2	4
15	Latvia	1	1	1	3
15	Portugal	1	1	1	3
17	Slovenia	1	1	0	2
18	Romania	1	0	2	3
19	Cyprus	1	0	1	2
20	Bosnia and Herzegovina	1	0	0	1
20	Estonia	1	0	0	1
22	Turkey	0	2	1	3
23	Ireland	0	0	4	4
24	Denmark	0	0	2	2
25	Croatia	0	0	1	1
25	Moldova	0	0	1	1
25	Slovakia	0	0	1	1
Totals (27 entries)		41	41	42	124

800m Boys: Muhammed Yalçın was awarded the bronze medal by the jury after he was hindered in the sprint to the finish. He was originally ranked seventh.

== Medalists ==
=== Boys ===
Event	Gold		Silver		Bronze	
100 m	Nikodem Dymiński; Poland	10.50	Edwin Fermin Galvan; Italy	10.54	Benjamin Sykes; Ireland	10.57
200 m	Nino Radosavljevic Kusljic; Sweden	21.09	Huba Pandur; Hungary	21.20	Joe Burke; Ireland	21.22
400 m	Tomáš Horák; Czech Republic	46.60 CR	Hugo Kjellander; Sweden	47.20	Spyridon Konidaris; Greece	47.42
800 m	Andor Schumann; Germany	1:48.82 CR	Umed Caraccio; Italy	1:49.59	Lennert Van Dyck; Belgium; Muhammed Yalçın; Turkey	1:51.74; 2.39.80
1500 m	Aloïs Abraham; France	3:48.39 CR	Álex Sierpes; Spain	3:49.53	Eric Huanca Quispe; Switzerland	3:49.84
3000 m	Sebastian Lörstad; Sweden	8:03.47 CR	Alfonso Gomes; Portugal	8:24.87	Sebastian Smed Grønkjær; Denmark	8:25.05
110 m hurdles	Rafael Franzini; Belgium	13.24 CR	Maël-Bephassou Lannurien; France	13.24	Anthony Perez; Spain	13.46
400 m hurdles	Diego Mancini; Italy	50.01 CR	Oğuzhan Yeşilobalıgil; Turkey	50.40	Travis Collet; France	50.97
2000 m steeplechase	Håkon Sørstad; Norway	5:42.26	Mathis Dubois; France	5:42.75	Michał Gajdus; Poland	5:43.43
Medley relay	Czech Republic; Jakub Marek; Štěpán Vardžák; Dominik Zajac; Jiří Vacek	1:52.43 CR	Turkey; Oğuzhan Yeşilobalıgil; Toprak Özdemir; Velat Bulut; Yağız Delice	1:53.58	Germany; Nikolas Tietze; Andor Schumann; Sebastian Hetzner; Gianluca Wessendorf	1:53.71
5000 m walk	Nicolo Vidal; Italy	20:22.43	Gabriel González; Spain	20:35.25	Vitalii Tarasiuk; Ukraine	20:55.71
High jump	Charalampos Alivizatos; Greece	2.15 m	Vojtěch Zajíček; Czech Republic	2.15 m	Daniels Ģiedris; Latvia	2.11 m
Pole vault	Zackaria Dia; France	5.20 m	Iván Varga; Hungary	5.15 m	Wiktor Jaroszewicz; Poland	4.95 m
Long jump	Rémi Mourié; France	7.86 m CR	Adam Billokon; Ukraine	7.47 m	Noah Hasler; Switzerland	7.28 m
Triple jump	Gora N'Diaye; France	15.38 m	Dimitrios Moumouris; Greece	15.12 m	Yoel Pérez; Spain	15.01 m
Shot put	Enhar Mahmić; Bosnia and Herzegovina	19.34 m	Hugo Casañas; Spain	19.33 m	Filip Kappel; Czech Republic	19.25 m
Discus throw	Toms Samauskis; Latvia	62.52 m	Mattia Bartolini; Italy	61.86 m	Yehor Lapa; Ukraine	60.73 m
Hammer throw	Alexandros Ghamrawi; Cyprus	78.32 m	Sotirios Gentekos; Greece	77.36 m	Artiom Olaru; Moldova	73.34 m
Javelin throw	Jere Murto; Finland	74.54 m	Oliver Menyhart; Hungary	68.97 m	Seppo Pauwels; Belgium	67.53 m
Decathlon	Matteo Sorci; Italy	7605 pts	Kilian Trochain; France	7462 pts	David Brügger; Switzerland	7285 pts

=== Girls ===
Event	Gold		Silver		Bronze	
100 m	Kelly Doualla; Italy	11.21 AU18B	Xenia Buri; Switzerland	11.30	Carolina Ventura; Portugal	11.56
200 m	Margherita Castellani; Italy	23.23 CR	Béatrice Tassin; France	23.51	Jamilia Magaji Bernhardsson; Sweden	23.56
400 m	Živa Remic; Slovenia	52.21 CR	Laura Frattaroli; Italy	53.71	Erin Friel; Ireland	54.02
800 m	Fiona von Flüe; Switzerland	2:03.18 CR	Cäcilia Weimann; Germany	2:04.36	Caterina Caligiana; Italy	2:05.07
1500 m	Mariana Moreira; Portugal	4:26.48	Laia Cariñanos; Spain	4:26.61	Oksana Pestka; Poland	4:26.66
3000 m	Venus Abraham Teffera; Norway	9:31.10	Amanda Román; Spain	9:31.45	Veronika Břízová; Czech Republic	9:32.78
100 m hurdles	Alessia Succo; Italy	13.04 CR	Sereina Liem; Switzerland	13.18	Nina Hejčíková; Slovakia	13.35
400 m hurdles	Mina Hirsbrunner; Switzerland	58.20	Emma Juntunen; Finland	58.78	Ellis McHugh; Ireland	59.25
2000 m steeplechase	Clémentine Byl; Belgium	6:31.29	Fanny Szalkai; Sweden	6:31.48	Debritu Paniagua; Spain	6:39.14
Medley relay	Italy; Isabella Pastore; Margherita Castellani; Laura Frattaroli; Kelly Doualla	2:04.57 AU18B	Switzerland; Xenia Buri; Jelena Schranz; Timea Rankl; Mina Hirsbrunner	2:05.93	Poland; Maja Gondek; Zofia Tomczyk; Aleksandra Przybylska; Milena Basińska	2:06.30
5000 m walk	Daphné Gateau-Fernez; France	22:49.08	Valentina Adamo; Italy	23:22.76	Chara Gerou; Greece	23:34.98
High jump	Aitana Alonso; Spain	1.86 m	Svea Victorén; Sweden	1.82 m	Lena-Maria Ionescu; Romania	1.76 m
Pole vault	Allika Inkeri Moser; Estonia	4.52 m WU18B	Moana Peyrard; France	4.05 m	Anastasia Boumpoulidi; Greece	3.95 m
Long jump	Aleksandra Sochacka; Poland	6.13 m	Ella Wallin; Finland	6.12 m	Ana-Maria Dogan; Romania	6.09 m
Triple jump	Daria Vrînceanu; Romania	13.65 m CR	Brenda Džiliana Apsīte; Latvia	13.52 m	Ana Estrella De León; Spain	13.51 m
Shot put	Anastasia Andreadi; Greece	17.33 m	Kinga Jackowska; Poland	17.13 m	Zara Veltruski; Croatia	16.38 m
Discus throw	Mirabella Keserű; Hungary	50.77 m	Theodora Kirmanidi; Greece	47.63 m	Marina Hadjicosta; Cyprus	47.41 m
Hammer throw	Polina Dzerozhynska; Ukraine	71.50 m	Alexandra Chernova; Greece	68.26 m	Mirabella Keserű; Hungary	65.85 m
Javelin throw	Amelia Gibas; Poland	51.15 m	Živa Križ; Slovenia	51.04 m	Viola Hansgaard; Denmark	49.25 m
Heptathlon	Svea Funck; Germany	5794 pts	Norina Hug; Switzerland	5609 pts	Tove Arwidson; Sweden	5317 pts

=== Mixed events ===
Event	Gold		Silver		Bronze	
4 × 400 m relay	Italy (ITA); Juan Jose Caggia; Laura Frattaroli; Caterina Caligiana; Diego Mancini	3:23.02 CR	Czech Republic (CZE); Jakub Marek; Alžběta Podzimková; Anna Cerovská; Tomáš Horák	3:23.54	Greece (GRE); Rafailia Giannoulidou; Eleni Iakovaki; Spyridon Konidaris; Savvas Chnitidis	3:27.53
