= Elisa Valensin =

Italian athlete (born 2007)

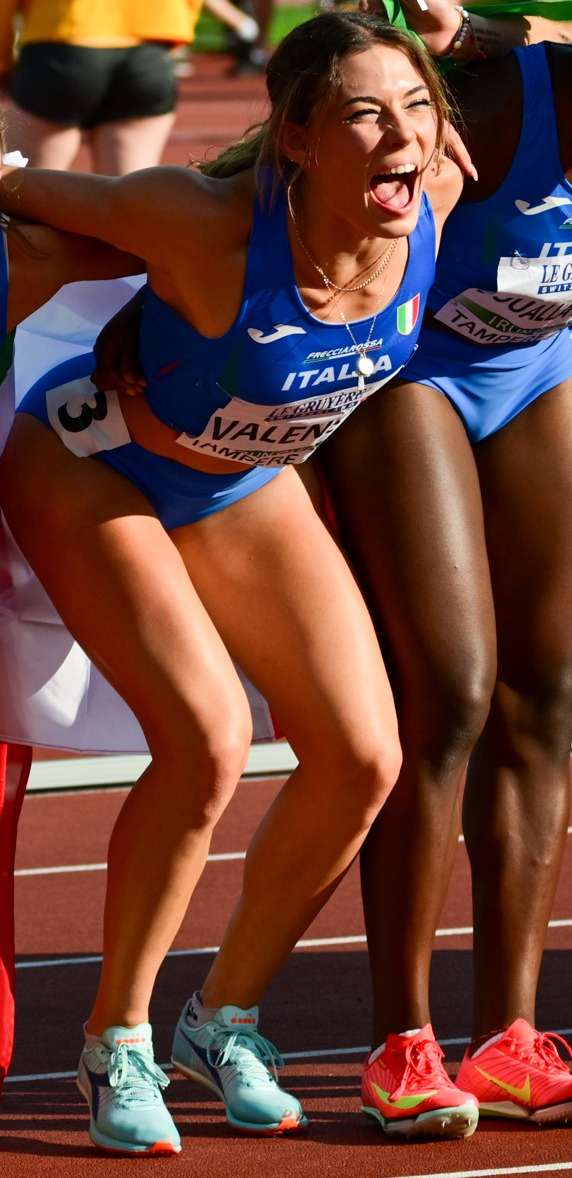

Personal information
- Nationality: Italian
- Born: 1 January 2007 (age 19)

Sport
- Sport: Athletics
- Event: Sprint
Medal record
Women's athletics
Representing Italy
World U20 Championships
Gold medal – first place	2026 Eugene	4x100 m mixed
European U20 Championships
Gold medal – first place	2025 Tampere	4x100 m relay
European U18 Championships
Gold medal – first place	2024 Banská Bystrica	200m
Gold medal – first place	2024 Banská Bystrica	Medley relay

Elisa Valensin (born 2007) is an Italian sprinter. She won two gold medals at the 2024 European Athletics U18 Championships, winning in the 200 metres and the medley relay.

== Biography ==
Valensin tried many sports as a youngster but focused on athletics from around 2015. She is a member of CUS Pro Patria Milan in Milan, Italy, but also trains regularly in Bergamo. Her training involves hurdles as well as sprints.

In February 2024, Valensin won the Italian indoor U20 200 metres title. In May 2024, she set a new Italian U20 200m record time of 23.15 seconds in Rome, aged 17 years-old. In July 2024, she won Italian U18 titles over 100 and 200 metres. She won gold in the 200 metres at the 2024 European Athletics U18 Championships in Banská Bystrica, Slovakia, on 20 July 2024. She also won gold as part of the Italian medley relay team at the Championships, in a European youth best time. She set a new national U20 record in qualifying for the final of the 400 metres at the 2024 World Athletics U20 Championships in Lima, Peru. She placed sixth in the final. She also had a fifth-place finish in the final of the women's 4 x 400 metres relay race with the Italian team at the Championships. The European Athletics Federation nominated her for the European Young Athlete of the Year award for 2024.

In January 2025, Valensin set a new Italian U20 indoor record in the 400 metres, running 53.04 seconds in Ancona. In February 2025, she also set a new Italian U20 record in the 200 metres indoors, running 23.39 seconds in Metz. In July 2025, she was selected for the Italian team for the 2025 European Athletics U20 Championships in Tampere, winning a gold medal with the Italian women's 4 x 100 metres relay team.

In May 2026, Valensin ran at the 2026 World Athletics Relays in the mixed 4 × 100 metres relay in Gaborone, Botswana. On 4 June, she placed eighth in the 200 metres at the 2026 Golden Gala in Rome, part of the 2026 Diamond League.

== Personal life ==
In 2025, she appeared in European Athletics documentary series My Fire.
