= Athletics at the European Youth Summer Olympic Festival =

Athletics has featured as a sport at the European Youth Summer Olympic Festival since its first edition in 1991. It has appeared on the programme at every subsequent edition of the biennial multi-sport event for European athletes under the age of 18. This age group corresponds with the youth category of athletics competition. However, during the games 2013, 2015 and 2017, the age group was changed to only include athletes under the age of 17. From the Baku games in 2019, the under-18 is again the age standard. That is, athletes must be either at the age of 16 or 17 of the year of the festival.

== Editions ==
Games	Year	Location	Best nation
I	1991	Brussels, Belgium	United Kingdom
II	1993	Valkenswaard, Netherlands	France
III	1995	Bath, United Kingdom	United Kingdom
IV	1997	Lisbon, Portugal	United Kingdom
V	1999	Esbjerg, Denmark	France
VI	2001	Murcia, Spain	Russia
VII	2003	Paris, France	Russia
VIII	2005	Lignano Sabbiadoro, Italy	Netherlands
IX	2007	Belgrade, Serbia	Russia
X	2009	Tampere, Finland	Russia
XI	2011	Trabzon, Turkey	United Kingdom
XII	2013	Utrecht, Netherlands	France
XIII	2015	Tbilisi, Georgia	France
XIV	2017	Győr, Hungary	Netherlands
XV	2019	Baku, Azerbaijan	Poland
XVI	2022	Banská Bystrica, Slovakia	Poland
XVII	2023	Maribor, Slovenia	Czech Republic
XVIII	2025	Skopje, North Macedonia	Italy

== Festival records ==
=== Boys ===
Event	Record	Athlete	Nationality	Date	Games	Place	Ref.
100 m	10.44 (+1.9 m/s)	Ylann Bizasene	France	24 July 2023	2023 Festival	Maribor, Slovenia	
200 m	20.98	Ramil Guliyev	Azerbaijan	July 2007	2007 Festival	Belgrade, Serbia	
400 m	46.60	Tomáš Horák	Czech Republic	22 July 2025	2025 Festival	Skopje, North Macedonia	
800 m	1:48.82	Andor Schumann	Germany	24 July 2025	2025 Festival	Skopje, North Macedonia	
1500 m	3:48.39	Aloïs Abraham	France	21 July 2025	2025 Festival	Skopje, North Macedonia	
3000 m	8:03.47	Sebastian Lörstad	Sweden	25 July 2025	2025 Festival	Skopje, North Macedonia	
110 m hurdles (91.4 cm)	13.24 (+0.1 m/s)	Rafael Franzini	Belgium	25 July 2025	2025 Festival	Skopje, North Macedonia	
400 m hurdles (84.0 cm)	50.01	Diego Mancini	Italy	25 July 2025	2025 Festival	Skopje, North Macedonia	
2000 m steeplechase	5:42.22	Antonio Alvares	Spain	July 1993	1993 Festival	Valkenswaard, Netherlands	
High jump	2.21 m	Daniil Tsyplakov	Russia	July 2009	2009 Festival	Tampere, Finland	
High jump	2.21 m	Attila Zsivoczky	Hungary	July 1993	1993 Festival	Valkenswaard, Netherlands	
Pole vault	5.31 m	Robert Renner	Slovenia	July 2011	2011 Festival	Trabzon, Turkey	
Long jump	7.86 m (−0.5 m/s)	Yassin Guellet	France	26 July 2025	2025 Festival	Skopje, North Macedonia	
Triple jump	15.56 m	Anvar Zeynalzade	Azerbaijan	July 2007	2007 Festival	Belgrade, Serbia	
Shot put (5 kg)	21.41 m	Konrad Bukowiecki	Poland	July 2013	2013 Festival	Utrecht, Netherlands	
Discus throw (1.5 kg)	72.31 m	Mykyta Nesterenko	Ukraine	July 2007	2007 Festival	Belgrade, Serbia	
Hammer throw (5 kg)	84.41 m	Bence Pásztor	Hungary	July 2011	2011 Festival	Trabzon, Turkey	
Javelin throw (700 g)	83.42 m	Yuriy Kushniruk	Ukraine	July 2011	2011 Festival	Trabzon, Turkey	
Decathlon	7761 pts	Sander Skotheim	Norway	22–23 July 2019	2019 Festival	Baku, Azerbaijan	
Decathlon	100m / Long jump / Shot put / High jump / 400m / 110m H / Discus / Pole vault / Javelin / 1500m; 11.46 (+1.4 m/s) / 6.95 m (+1.3 m/s) / 14.96 m (5 kg) / 2.00 m / 50.56 / 14.50 (+2.6 m/s) (91.4 cm) / 47.98 m / 4.20 m / 62.10 m (700 g) / 4:46.76						
5000 m walk (track)	20:22.18	Daniel Monfort	Spain	24 July 2023	2023 Festival	Maribor, Slovenia	
10,000 m walk (track)	45:15.74	Gabriele Gamba	Italy	22 July 2019	2019 Festival	Baku, Azerbaijan	
4 × 100 m relay	40.68	Great Britain	Great Britain	July 1995	1995 Festival	Bath, United Kingdom	
Medley relay	1:52.43	Jan Filounek; Štěpán Vardžák; Jakub Marek; Tomáš Horák	Czech Republic	26 July 2025	2025 Festival	Skopje, North Macedonia	

=== Girls ===
Event	Record	Athlete	Nationality	Date	Games	Place	Ref.
100 m	11.21 (±0.0 m/s) AU18B	Kelly Doualla	Italy	21 July 2025	2025 Festival	Skopje, North Macedonia	
200 m	23.23 (+0.2 m/s)	Margherita Castellani	Italy	25 July 2025	2025 Festival	Skopje, North Macedonia	
400 m	52.21	Živa Remic	Slovenia	22 July 2025	2025 Festival	Skopje, North Macedonia	
800 m	2:03.18	Fiona von Flüe	Switzerland	26 July 2025	2025 Festival	Skopje, North Macedonia	
1500 m	4:15.46	Ciara Mageean	Ireland	22 July 2009	2009 Festival	Tampere, Finland	
3000 m	9:17.90	Amela Terzic	Serbia	21 July 2009	2009 Festival	Tampere, Finland	
100 m hurdles (76.2 cm)	13.04 (+0.1 m/s)	Alessia Succo	Italy	25 July 2025	2025 Festival	Skopje, North Macedonia	
400 m hurdles (76.2 cm)	56.28	Olha Mashanienkova	Ukraine	27 July 2023	2023 Festival	Maribor, Slovenia	
2000 m steeplechase	6:23.58	Karolína Jarošová	Czech Republic	27 July 2023	2023 Festival	Maribor, Slovenia	
High jump	1.89 m	Svetlana Lapina	Russia	11 July 1995	1995 Festival	Bath, United Kingdom	
High jump	1.89 m	Yaroslava Mahuchikh	Ukraine	29 July 2017	2017 Festival	Győr, Hungary	
Pole vault	4.52 m WU18B	Allika Inkeri Moser	Estonia	21 July 2025	2025 Festival	Skopje, North Macedonia	
Long jump	6.43 m	Darya Klishina	Russia	27 July 2007	2007 Festival	Belgrade, Serbia	
Triple jump	13.65 m (+0.1 m/s)	Daria Vrînceanu	Romania	25 July 2025	2025 Festival	Skopje, North Macedonia	
Shot put (3 kg)	19.12 m	Corrie de Bruin	Netherlands	July 1993	1993 Festival	Valkenswaard, Netherlands	
Shot put (4 kg)	15.95 m	Melissa Boekelman	Netherlands	6 July 2005	2005 Festival	Lignano Sabbiadoro, Italy	
Discus throw (1 kg)	55.37 m	Violetta Ignatyeva	Russia	24 July 2019	2019 Festival	Baku, Azerbaijan	
Hammer throw (3 kg)	72.35 m	Silja Kosonen	Finland	25 July 2019	2019 Festival	Baku, Azerbaijan	
Javelin throw (500 g)	60.09 m	Carolina Visca	Italy	1 August 2015	2015 Festival	Tbilisi, Georgia	
Javelin throw (600 g)	53.86 m	Alina Gerasimchuk	Russia	29 July 2011	2011 Festival	Trabzon, Turkey	
Heptathlon	5913 pts	Saga Vanninen	Finland	24–25 July 2019	2019 Festival	Baku, Azerbaijan	
Heptathlon	100m H / High jump / Shot put / 200m / Long jump / Javelin / 800m; 13.49 (+1.1 m/s) (76.2 cm) / 1.71 m / 14.13 m (4 kg) / 24.94 (+0.3 m/s) / 5.89 m (−0.1 m/s) / 44.69 m (500 g) / 2:27.38						
5000 m walk (track)	22:26.01	Jekaterina Mirotvortseva	Estonia	26 July 2019	2019 Festival	Baku, Azerbaijan	
4 × 100 m relay	45.99	France	France	July 1991	1991 Festival	Brussels, Belgium	
Medley relay	2:04.57	Kelly Doualla; Alessia Succo; Laura Frattaroli; Margherita Castellani	Italy	26 July 2025	2025 Festival	Skopje, North Macedonia	

=== Mixed ===
Event	Record	Athlete	Nationality	Date	Games	Place	Ref.
4 × 400 m relay	3:23.02	Juan Jose Caggia; Caterina Caligiana; Diego Mancini; Laura Frattaroli	Italy	23 July 2025	2025 Festival	Skopje, North Macedonia	

== See also ==
- International athletics championships and games
- Figure skating at the European Youth Olympic Festival
