= 2025 European Athletics U23 Championships – Women's shot put =

Women's shot put at the 2025 European Athletics U23 Championships
- Venue: Fana Stadion
- Location: Bergen, Norway
- Dates: 17 July (qualification); 19 July (final)
- Competitors: 32 from 18 nations
- Winning distance: 17.73 m

Medalists
gold medal	Nina Chioma Ndubuisi	Germany
silver medal	Jolina Lange	Germany
bronze medal	Helena Kopp	Germany

The women's shot put event at the 2025 European Athletics U23 Championships was held in Bergen, Norway, at Fana Stadion on 17 and 19 July.

== Records ==
Prior to the competition, the records were as follows:

Record	Athlete (nation)	Distance (m)	Location	Date
European U23 record	Natalya Lisovskaya (URS)	22.53 m	Sochi, Soviet Union	27 May 1984
Championship U23 record	Nadezhda Ostapchuk (BLR)	19.73 m	Amsterdam, Netherlands	12 July 2001

== Results ==
=== Qualification ===
All athletes over 19.00 m (Q) or at least the 12 best performers (q) advance to the final.

==== Group A ====
Place	Athlete	Nation	#1	#2	#3	Result	Notes
1	Jolina Lange	Germany	x	15.81	x	15.81 m	q
2	Katrin Brzyszkowská	Czech Republic	x	15.74	x	15.74 m	q
3	Helena Kopp	Germany	15.69	15.30	15.71	15.71 m	q
4	Victoria Wickman	Sweden	15.71	x	15.32	15.71 m	q
5	Inés López	Spain	15.02	13.98	15.23	15.23 m	q
6	Lucija Leko	Croatia	x	14.31	14.87	14.87 m	
7	Lotte Haest	Netherlands	14.54	14.75	13.99	14.75 m	
8	Vilma KeräLä	Finland	14.73	14.62	x	14.73 m	
9	Vivian Otoibhi Osagie	Italy	14.65	x	13.83	14.65 m	
10	Mia Feer	Switzerland	14.00	14.57	13.80	14.57 m	
11	Büsra Hatun Ekinci	Turkey	13.90	13.55	x	13.90 m	
12	Maria Andreadi	Greece	13.66	13.22	13.51	13.53 m	
13	Aleksandra Torończak	Poland	13.50	13.34	13.53	13.30 m	
14	Berivan Yiğit	Turkey	x	13.30	x	13.19 m	
15	Mariell Morken	Norway	12.97	x	x	12.97 m	
16	Luīze Geistarde	Latvia	x	x	12.39	12.39 m	

==== Group B ====
Place	Athlete	Nation	#1	#2	#3	Result	Notes
1	Nina Chioma Ndubuisi	Germany	16.23	x	16.46	16.46	q
2	Martina Mazurová	Czech Republic	15.79	15.85	x	15.85	q
3	Minttu Laurila	Finland	14.98	15.64	15.46	15.64	q
4	Zuzanna Maślana	Poland	15.15	15.61	15.37	15.61	q
5	Anastasia Dragomirova	Greece	x	14.53	15.47	15.47	q
6	Lenja Heusser	Switzerland	15.04	14.31	x	15.04	q, PB
7	Anna Musci	Italy	15.03	14.93	14.03	15.03	q
8	Pınar Akyol	Turkey	x	14.52	14.93	14.93	
9	Réka Kling	Hungary	x	14.66	x	14.66	PB
10	Jonna Lundgren	Sweden	13.09	14.02	13.94	14.02 m	
11	Monika Marjová	Slovakia	13.75	x	13.91	13.91 m	
12	Anđela Obradović	Serbia	13.58	13.54	13.86	13.86 m	
13	Beatrice Pettersson	Sweden	13.83	x	x	13.83 m	
14	Sarah Schmid	Switzerland	x	x	13.79	13.79 m	
15	Vesna Kljajević	Montenegro	13.66	13.22	13.51	13.66 m	
16	Tuuli Kammonen	Finland	12.97	x	12.44	12.97 m	

=== Final ===
Place	Athlete	Nation	#1	#2	#3	#4	#5	#6	Result	Notes
1st place, gold medalist(s)	Nina Chioma Ndubuisi	Germany	16.32	17.68	x	16.62	x	17.73	17.73 m	
2nd place, silver medalist(s)	Jolina Lange	Germany	16.50	16.77	16.76	x	x	17.04	17.04 m	PB
3rd place, bronze medalist(s)	Helena Kopp	Germany	15.90	16.61	16.60	15.40	x	16.90	16.90 m	PB
4	Zuzanna Maślana	Poland	15.67	16.19	x	16.64	x	x	16.64 m	
5	Anastasia Dragomirova	Greece	15.83	16.09	x	15.74	15.77	x	16.09 m	PB
6	Martina Mazurová	Czech Republic	14.99	15.33	16.04	x	15.89	x	16.04 m	
7	Katrin Brzyszkowská	Czech Republic	15.99	x	x	x	x	x	15.99 m	
8	Inés López	Spain	15.94	14.80	15.58	x	15.41	x	15.94 m	
9	Minttu Laurila	Finland	15.25	x	15.89				15.89 m	
10	Anna Musci	Italy	14.96	x	14.45				14.96 m	
11	Victoria Wickman	Sweden	x	x	14.53				14.53 m	
12	Lenja Heusser	Switzerland	x	14.25	x				14.25 m	
