= Sophia Gregorevic =

Australian athlete (born 2005)

Personal information
- Born: 5 November 2005 (age 20)

Sport
- Sport: Athletics
- Event: Sprint

Achievements and titles
- Personal best: 400m: 53.63s (2025)
Medal record
Women's athletics
Representing Australia
World U20 Championships
Gold medal – first place	2024 Lima	4x400 m mixed
Silver medal – second place	2024 Lima	4x400 m relay

Sophia Gregorevic (born 5 November 2005) is an Australian sprinter.

== Career ==
She won gold in the mixed 4x400 metres relay as part of an Australian team that set two national U20 records at the 2024 World Athletics U20 Championships in Lima, Peru in August 2024. She also won the silver medal in the women's 4 × 400 m relay.

== Personal life ==
From Victoria, she attended Wesley College, Melbourne and the University of Melbourne. She is a member of Sandringham Athletic club.
