= 2024 World Athletics U20 Championships – Women's 4 × 400 metres relay =

Women's 4 × 400 metres relay at the 2024 World Athletics U20 Championships
- Venue: Estadio Atlético de la VIDENA
- Dates: 30 August 2024 (heats); 31 August 2024 (final
- Competitors: 75 from 16 nations
- Winning time: 3:30.74

Medalists
gold medal	Michaela Mouton; Olivia Harris; Josie Donelson; Zava Akins; Lakely Doht-Barron*; Isabella Kneeshaw*	United States
silver medal	Amelia Rowe; Bella Pasquali; Jemma Pollard; Sophie Gregorevic; Charlotte McAuliffe*	Australia
bronze medal	Charlotte Henrich; Emma Holmes; Kara Dacosta; Rebecca Grieve; Jessica Astill*; Nandy Kihuyu*	Great Britain

The women's 4 × 400 metres relay at the 2024 World Athletics U20 Championships was held at the Estadio Atlético de la VIDENA in Lima, Peru on 30 and 31 August 2024.

== Records ==
U20 standing records prior to the 2024 World Athletics U20 Championships were as follows:

Record	Nation	Mark	Location	Date
World U20 Record	United States	3:27.60	Grosseto, Italy	18 July 2004
Championship Record	United States	3:27.60	Grosseto, Italy	18 July 2004
World U20 Leading	United States	3:23.80	Gainesville, United States	13 April 2024

== Results ==
=== Heats ===
First 2 of each heat (Q) plus the 2 fastest times (q) qualified for the final.

==== Heat 1 ====
Rank	Nation	Athletes	Time	Notes
1	Italy	Margherita Castellani, Giulia Macchi, Laura Frattaroli, Elisa Valensin	3:34.14	Q, SB
2	Poland	Dominika Duraj, Wiktoria Gajosz, Lena Pajęcka, Zofia Tomczyk	3:34.77	Q, SB
3	United States	Lakely Doht-Barron, Olivia Harris, Isabella Kneeshaw, Josie Donelson	3:36.71	q
4	Brazil	Amanda da Silva, Grazielly Sena, Bianca Ferreira, Julia Ribeiro	3:45.13	SB
–	Germany	Luna Fischer, Pauline Richter, Jana Becker, Johanna Martin	DQ	TR24.20
–	Peru	Kimberly Borja, Luciana Fernández, Jacoba Goicochea, Ximena Vásquez	DQ	TR24.15

==== Heat 2 ====
Rank	Nation	Athletes	Time	Notes
1	Colombia	Isabella Hurtado, Paola Loboa, Dana Jiménez, Nahomy Castro	3:38.01	Q, SB
2	Jamaica	Abrina Wright, Shanque Williams, Anecia Campbell, Nastassia Fletcher	3:38.04	Q
3	India	Sandramol Sabu, Kanista Maria Deva Sheka, Neeru Pahtak, Shravani Sangle	3:40.43	SB
4	Ecuador	Camille Romero, Génesis Cañola, Pamela Barreto, Xiomara Ibarra	3:51.96	
–	South Africa	Precious Molepo, Colene Scheepers, Carise van Rooyen, Chane Vermeulen	DQ	TR24.20
–	Nigeria		DNS	

==== Heat 3 ====
Rank	Nation	Athletes	Time	Notes
1	Australia	Charlotte McAuliffe, Bella Pasquali, Jemma Pollard, Sophie Gregorevic	3:33.55	Q
2	Norway	Borghild Holstad, Line Al-Saiddi, Elise Eikeland, Camilla Dahl Kristiansen	3:35.72	Q, NU20R
3	Great Britain	Jessica Astill, Emma Holmes, Nandy Kihuyu, Rebecca Grieve	3:36.69	q
4	Spain	Lara Tome, Natalia Rojas, Elisa Lorenzo, Ana Prieto	3:40.64	SB
5	Argentina	Helen Bernard Stilling, Juana Zuberbuhler, Malena Galvan, Isabel Conde Frankenberg	3:47.10	
–	Czech Republic		DNS	

=== Final ===
Rank	Nation	Athletes	Time	Notes
1st place, gold medalist(s)	United States	Michaela Mouton, Olivia Harris, Josie Donelson, Zava Akins	3:30.74	SB
2nd place, silver medalist(s)	Australia	Amelia Rowe, Bella Pasquali, Jemma Pollard, Sophie Gregorevic	3:31.47	SB
3rd place, bronze medalist(s)	Great Britain	Charlotte Henrich, Emma Holmes, Kara Dacosta, Rebecca Grieve	3:32.80	SB
4	Poland	Dominika Duraj, Wiktoria Gajosz, Zofia Tomczyk, Wiktoria Gadajska	3:34.80	
5	Italy	Margherita Castellani, Giulia Macchi, Laura Frattaroli, Elisa Valensin	3:35.47	
6	Norway	Borghild Holstad, Line Al-Saiddi, Selma Ims, Malin Hoelsveen	3:36.38	
7	Colombia	Isabella Hurtado, Paola Loboa, Dana Jiménez, Nahomy Castro	3:37.75	SB
8	Jamaica	Abrina Wright, Alliah Bker, Anecia Campbell, Kelly Ann Carr	3:39.30	
