= Han Bingyang =

Chinese athlete (born 2007)

Personal information
- Nationality: Chinese
- Born: 16 January 2007 (age 19)

Sport
- Sport: Athletics
- Event: Discus throw

Achievements and titles
- Personal bests: Discus: 57.57m (Lima, 2024)
Medal record
Women's athletics
Representing China
World U20 Championships
Gold medal – first place	2024 Lima	Discus
Asian U20 Championships
Gold medal – first place	2024 Dubai	Discus

Han Bingyang (born 16 January 2007) is a Chinese discus thrower. She won gold at the 2024 U20 World Championships.

== Biography ==
She won gold in the discus throw at the 2024 Asian U20 Athletics Championships in Dubai in April 2024.

She won gold in the discus throw at the 2024 World Athletics U20 Championships in Lima, Peru with a personal best distance of 57.57 metres. She had qualified second at the event, with a throw of 55.64 metres in the preliminary round, behind compatriot Huang Jingru.
