= Akaoma Odeluga =

American athlete (born 2005)

Personal information
- Born: 14 May 2005 (age 21)

Sport
- Sport: Athletics
- Event: Shot put

Achievements and titles
- Personal best: Shot put: 18.13m (2024)
Medal record
Women's athletics
Representing United States
World U20 Championships
| Gold medal – first place | 2024 Lima | Shot put |

Akaoma Odeluga (born 14 May 2005) is an American shot putter. She won gold at the 2024 World Athletics U20 Championships.

== Biography ==
From Munster, Indiana, she finished third at the 2024 SEC Championships competing for the University of Mississippi. She placed eleventh at the US Olympic Trials in Eugene, Oregon in June 2024. That month in Eugene, she finished runner-up at the US U20 Championships in the shot put.

She won the gold medal in the shot put at the 2024 World Athletics U20 Championships in Lima, Peru on 30 August 2024.

In May 2026, Odeluga won the women's shot put at the SEC Championships competing for Ole Miss, throwing 18.25 meters.
