= Jolanda Kallabis =

German athlete

Personal information
- Born: 18 February 2005 (age 21)

Sport
- Sport: Athletics
- Event: Middle distance running

Achievements and titles
- Personal best(s): 800 m: 2:01.80 (2025); 1500 m: 4:07.44 (2024)
Medal record
Women's athletics
Representing Germany
World Junior Championships
Bronze medal – third place	2024 Lima	1500 m
European U18 Championships
Gold medal – first place	2022 Jerusalem	2000 m S'chase

Jolanda Kallabis (born 18 February 2005) is a German middle-distance runner. She won the German Indoor Championships over 800 metres in 2023. The previous year, she set a U18 world-best time in the 2000 metres steeplechase.

== Career ==
She competed as a 16-year-old for Germany in the 1500 metres at the 2021 European Athletics U20 Championships in Tallinn, Estonia, narrowly missing a place in the final.

She won the gold medal in the 2000 metres steeplechase at the 2022 European Athletics U18 Championships in Jerusalem, Israel, in a championship record time of 6:20.22 ahead of compatriot Adia Budde. That year, she ran the 800 m in 2:04.57 to break the German indoor U18 record, which had been held by Hildegard Ullrich since 1976 and won win the German indoor U20 title, despite still being 17 years-old. In September 2022, she set a world-best under-18 time for the 2000 metres steeplechase, running a time of 6:07:32. She was named Youth Athlete of 2022 by the German Athletics Association (DLV).

Competing for FT 1844 Freiburg, she won the senior German Indoor Athletics Championships over 800 metres in Dortmund in February 2023 one day after her eighteenth birthday, although she subsequently missed the outdoor season that year with a foot injury. She won the bronze medal in the 1500 metres at the 2024 World Athletics U20 Championships in Lima, Peru.

She finished third over 1500 metres at the German Indoor Championships in Dortmund in February 2025. In June 2025, she set a personal best for the 800 metres of 2:01.80 whilst competing in Pfungstadt. She competed for Germany at the 2025 European Athletics U23 Championships in Bergen, Norway.

In September 2025, she competed over 1500 metres at the 2025 World Championships in Tokyo, Japan, without advancing to the semi-finals.

== Personal life ==
From Freiburg, she is the daughter of Damian Kallabis, who won the 3000 m steeplechase title at the European Athletics Championships in 1998.
