= Tom Teršek =

Slovenian athlete (born 2006)

Personal information
- Nationality: Slovenian
- Born: 6 September 2006 (age 19)

Sport
- Sport: Athletics
- Event: Javelin throw
Medal record
Men's athletics
Representing Slovenia
World U20 Championships
Gold medal – first place	2024 Lima	Javelin throw

Tom Teršek (born 6 September 2006) is a Slovenian javelin thrower. He won the gold medal at the 2024 World Athletics U20 Championships at the age of 17 years-old.

== Early life ==
He is from Triglav in Kranj, in the Upper Carniola region of Slovenia. He attended Carniola High School. In November 2024, as he approached his final year in secondary education it was reported that he had received multiple offers from colleges in the United States, including the University of Southern California.

== Career ==
He is a member of AK Triglav Kranj, but is coached by his father Robert. He won the bronze medal in the javelin throw at the 2023 European Youth Summer Olympic Festival in Maribor, Slovenia, with a throw of 73.57 meters to become the first home medalist at the Games.

In June 2024, competing in Novo Mesto, he threw 78.22 meters to move to fifth on the all-time Slovenian javelin throw list. At the Slovenian national athletics championships later that month in Celje, Teršek threw the javelin 80.87 metres to set a new Slovenian U23 national record, whilst still 17 years-old, and within a metre of the national record held by Matija Kranjc, who threw 81.13 m in Brežice in 2016.

He won the gold medal competing at the 2024 World Athletics U20 Championships in the men's javelin throw in Lima, Peru. He did so with a throw of 76.81 metres to become the second Slovenian in history to win gold at the world junior level and the first since Gregor Cankar in the long jump in 1994.

In September 2024, he was nominated for the European Athletics Rising Star award.
