= Méta Tumba =

French athlete (born 2006)

Personal information
- Born: 3 June 2006 (age 20) Angoulême, France

Sport
- Country: France
- Sport: Athletics
- Event: 400m hurdles

Achievements and titles
- Personal bests: 400 mH: 55.22 (Albi, 2026)
Medal record
Women's athletics
Representing France
World U20 Championships
Gold medal – first place	2024 Lima	400 m hurdles
European U20 Championships
Gold medal – first place	2023 Jerusalem	4x400 m relay
Gold medal – first place	2025 Tampere	4x400 m relay
Silver medal – second place	2025 Tampere	400 m hurdles
Mediterranean Games
Silver medal – second place	2026 Taranto	4 × 400 m relay

Méta Tumba (born 3 June 2006) is a French hurdler. She won the gold medal at the 2024 World Athletics U20 Championships in the 400 metres hurdles.

== Early life ==
She is from the Charente department, where became a member the Grand Angoulême Athlétisme club and trained initially as a multi-event athlete.

== Career ==
She won the French indoor title in February 2023 over 400 metres. She won bronze in the 400 metres hurdles at the European Youth Summer Olympic Festival in Maribor running a French junior record of 57.10 seconds in July 2023. She won gold in the 4 x 400 metres relay at the 2023 European Athletics U20 Championships in Jerusalem.

She won gold in the 400m hurdles at the 2024 World Athletics U20 Championships in Lima, Peru in August 2024 with a French national under-20 record time of 55.59 seconds. She went unbeaten during the championships, also winning her qualifying heat and semi-final.

She won the French under-20 championships in St Etienne over 400 metres hurdles in June 2025. She competed at the 2025 European Athletics U20 Championships in Tampere, Finland, running 55.56 seconds for a lifetime best and a French U20 record to win the silver medal in the final. She also anchored the French women's 4 × 400 m relay team to the gold medal.

In July 2026, Tumba ran a new personal best 55.22 seconds to win the 400 metre hurdles at the senior French Athletics Championships in Albi, moving to fifth on the French all-time list at the age of 20 years-old. Competing at the 2026 European Athletics Championships in Birmingham, England, she did not advance to the semi-finals in the 400 metres hurdles.
