= 2024 World Athletics U20 Championships – Mixed 4 × 400 metres relay =

Mixed 4 × 400 metres relay at the 2024 World Athletics U20 Championships
- Venue: Estadio Atlético de la VIDENA
- Dates: 27 August (heats & final)
- Competitors: 88 from 21 nations
- Winning time: 3:19.27

Medalists
| gold medal | Jordan Gilbert; Bella Pasquali; Jack Deguara; Sophia Gregorevic | Australia |
| silver medal | Jakub Szarapo; Wiktoria Gajosz; Stanisław Strzelecki; Zofia Tomczyk; Michał Kijewski* | Poland |
| bronze medal | Fu Haoran; Wang Yalun; Ailixier Wumaier; Liu Yinglan; Xu Xinfeng* | China |

The mixed 4 × 400 metres relay at the 2024 World Athletics U20 Championships will be held at the Estadio Atlético de la VIDENA in Lima, Peru on 27 August 2024.

== Records ==
U20 standing records prior to the 2024 World Athletics U20 Championships were as follows:

| Record | Nation | Mark | Location | Date |
|---|---|---|---|---|
| Championship Record | United States | 3:17.69 | Cali, Colombia | 2 August 2022 |
| World U20 Leading | South Africa | 3:14.97 | Johannesburg, South Africa | 27 March 2024 |

== Results ==
=== Heats ===
First 2 of each heat (Q) plus the 2 fastest times (q) qualified for the final.

==== Heat 1 ====
| Rank | Nation | Athletes | Time | Notes |
|---|---|---|---|---|
| 1 | Australia | Jordan Gilbert, Bella Pasquali, Jack Deguara, Sophia Gregorevic | 3:21.10 | Q, AU20R |
| 2 | India | Jay Kumar, Neeru Pathak, Rihan Chaudhary, Sandramol Sabu | 3:22.54 | Q, SB |
| 3 | Romania | Alexandru Vochin, Stefania Balint, Dragos Nastasa, Maria Capotă | 3:22.80 | q, NU20R |
| 4 | China | Xu Xinfeng, Wang Yalun, Fu Haoran, Liu Yinglan | 3:23.16 | q |
| 5 | Colombia | Hugo Thyme, Nahomy Castro, José David Mosquera, Paola Loboa | 3:25.91 | |
| 6 | South Africa | Kryn Romijn, Colene Scheepers, Sihle Mahlangu, Naledi Makgatha | 3:27.86 | SB |
| 7 | Ecuador | Elias Cañola, Génesis Cañola, Ian Pata, Xiomara Ibarra | 3:28.08 | NU20R |

==== Heat 2 ====
| Rank | Nation | Athletes | Time | Notes |
|---|---|---|---|---|
| 1 | Germany | Fabian Straberg, Pauline Richter, Cedric Barth, Jana Becker | 3:24.10 | Q, SB |
| 2 | Jamaica | Demarco Bennett, Nastassia Fletcher, Marcinho Rose, Alliah Baker | 3:24.77 | Q, SB |
| 3 | Nigeria | Oseiwe Salami, Odot Udo, Gafari Badmus, Favour Onyah | 3:25.59 | SB |
| 4 | Ireland | Conor Kelly, Daisy Walker, Sean Doggett, Niamh Murray | 3:26.40 | |
| 5 | Spain | Asabu Pines, Natalia Rojas, Biel Cirujeda, Ana Galvez | 3:27.53 | PB |
| 6 | Argentina | Manuel Juarez, Celeste Molina, Tomas Miron, Malena Galvan | 3:29.28 | |
| 7 | Botswana | Justice Oratile, Warona Thonisani, Keorapetse Oreokame, Ame Bogoma | 3:32.75 | SB |
| – | Venezuela | | DNS | |

==== Heat 3 ====
| Rank | Nation | Athletes | Time | Notes |
|---|---|---|---|---|
| 1 | Poland | Michał Kijewski, Wiktoria Gajosz, Stanisław Strzelecki, Zofia Tomczyk | 3:21.92 | Q, SB |
| 2 | Norway | Bastian Elnan Aurstad, Borghild Holstad, Sindre Strønstad-Løseth, Camilla Dahl Kristiansen | 3:23.93 | Q, PB |
| 3 | France | Melvyn Cavagnoux, Noam Tanon, Thibault Buchard, Romane Trinquant | 3:24.21 | PB |
| 4 | Italy | Cosimo Paggini, Giulia Macchi, Luca Marsicovetere, Margherita Castellani | 3:25.11 | SB |
| 5 | Brazil | Vinicius Moura, Grazielly Vanderlei Sena, Victor Chaves, Julia Rocha | 3:25.44 | SB |
| 6 | Guyana | Enock Munroe, Narissa McPherson, Gill De Neilson, Tianna Springer | 3:26.06 | |
| – | Peru | Anderson Tavara, Emilia Martinez, Jeffrey Cajo, Daniela Salazar | DQ | TR17.2.4 |

=== Final ===
| Rank | Nation | Athletes | Time | Notes |
|---|---|---|---|---|
| 1st place, gold medalist(s) | Australia | Jordan Gilbert, Bella Pasquali, Jack Deguara, Sophia Gregorevic | 3:19.27 | AU20R |
| 2nd place, silver medalist(s) | Poland | Jakub Szarapo, Wiktoria Gajosz, Stanisław Strzelecki, Zofia Tomczyk | 3:20.44 | SB |
| 3rd place, bronze medalist(s) | China | Fu Haoran, Wang Yalun, Ailixier Wumaier, Liu Yinglan | 3:21.27 | PB |
| 4 | Jamaica | Demarco Bennett, Shanniqua Williams, Marcinho Rose, Alliah Baker | 3:22.74 | SB |
| 5 | India | Jay Kumar, Neeru Pahtak, Rihan Chaudhary, Sandramol Sabu | 3:22.92 | |
| 6 | Germany | Cedric Barth, Pauline Richter, Lucien Berger, Luna Fischer | 3:24.52 | |
| 7 | Romania | Alexandru Vochin, Stefania Balint, Dragos Nastasa, Maria Capotă | 3:24.59 | |
| 8 | Norway | Bastian Elnan Aurstad, Borghild Holstad, Sindre Strønstad-Løseth, Camilla Dahl Kristiansen | 3:25.37 | |
