= 2024 World Athletics U20 Championships – Women's 1500 metres =

Women's 1500 metres at the 2024 World Athletics U20 Championships
- Venue: Estadio Atlético de la VIDENA
- Dates: 28 August 2024 (heats); 31 August 2024 (final)
- Competitors: 42 from 29 nations
- Winning time: 4:16.64

Medalists
gold medal	Saron Berhe	Ethiopia
silver medal	Rachel Forsyth	Canada
bronze medal	Jolanda Kallabis	Germany

The women's 1500 metres at the 2024 World Athletics U20 Championships was held at the Estadio Atlético de la VIDENA in Lima, Peru on 28 and 31 August 2024.

== Records ==
U20 standing records prior to the 2024 World Athletics U20 Championships were as follows:

Record	Athlete & Nationality	Mark	Location	Date
World U20 Record	Lang Yinglai (CHN)	3:51.34	Shanghai, China	18 October 1997
Championship Record	Brenda Chebet (KEN)	4:04.64	Cali, Colombia	6 August 2022
World U20 Leading	Saron Berhe (ETH)	3:59.21	Xiamen, China	20 April 2024

== Results ==
=== Heats ===
The first 5 athletes in each heat (Q) qualified to the final.

==== Heat 1 ====
Rank	Athlete	Nation	Time	Notes
1	Ava Lloyd	Great Britain	4:21.53	Q
2	Tsige Teshome	Ethiopia	4:21.92	Q
3	Shirin Kerber	Switzerland	4:22.21	Q
4	Cleo Richardson	Australia	4:22.35	Q, PB
5	Miriam Kibet	Kenya	4:22.53	Q
6	Li Yuan	China	4:22.70	
7	Laila Yahyaoui	Netherlands	4:24.52	
8	Tia Živko	Slovenia	4:24.82	
9	Paige Marchant	Canada	4:26.31	
10	Shieri Doruri	Japan	4:27.08	
11	Maria Avelino	Portugal	4:29.40	
12	Naomi Toomenurm	Estonia	4:36.62	
–	Elle Ceder	Finland	DNF	
–	Boh Ritchie	New Zealand	DQ	TR17.1.2

==== Heat 2 ====
Rank	Athlete	Nation	Time	Notes
1	Saron Berhe	Ethiopia	4:18.88	Q
2	Mary Ogwoka	Kenya	4:21.72	Q
3	Dylan McElhinney	United States	4:21.74	Q
4	Lera Miller	Germany	4:22.07	Q
5	Natalija Grujić	Serbia	4:23.20	Q
6	Hassana Ibn Abdelmatey	Morocco	4:23.77	PB
7	Zuzanna Wiernicka	Poland	4:24.10	
8	Elisa Clementi	Italy	4:24.69	
9	Naledi Makgatha	South Africa	4:28.72	
10	Tena Marodi	Croatia	4:29.08	
11	Lenuta Constantin	Romania	4:29.85	
12	Andrea Nygård Vie	Norway	4:31.34	
13	Marie Glaser	Austria	4:32.99	
14	Kiera Hall	New Zealand	4:34.92	
15	Dayana Flores	Peru	4:45.27	

==== Heat 3 ====
Rank	Athlete	Nation	Time	Notes
1	Rachel Forsyth	Canada	4:20.85	Q
2	Saida El-Bouzy	Morocco	4:20.94	Q, PB
3	Jolanda Kallabis	Germany	4:22.33	Q
4	Daphne Dornic	France	4:22.34	Q
5	Marte Hovland	Norway	4:22.88	Q
6	Ada Rand	Australia	4:23.94	
7	Li-mari Dekker	South Africa	4:27.02	
8	Saima Murić	Serbia	4:28.14	
9	Alexandra Hudea	Romania	4:31.93	
10	Lea Marodi	Croatia	4:32.56	
11	Francesca Piccolo	Italy	4:33.73	
12	Beatriz Azevedo	Portugal	4:34.95 (.947)	
12	Laxita Sandilea	India	4:34.95 (.947)	
–	Elena Liaño	Spain	DNS	

=== Final ===
Rank	Athlete	Nation	Time	Notes
1st place, gold medalist(s)	Saron Berhe	Ethiopia	4:16.64	
2nd place, silver medalist(s)	Rachel Forsyth	Canada	4:17.94	
3rd place, bronze medalist(s)	Jolanda Kallabis	Germany	4:19.34	
4	Shirin Kerber	Switzerland	4:20.30	SB
5	Ava Lloyd	Great Britain	4:20.64	
6	Daphne Dornic	France	4:20.80	
7	Cleo Richardson	Australia	4:20.91	PB
8	Saida El-Bouzy	Morocco	4:21.05	
9	Marte Hovland	Norway	4:21.46	
10	Mary Ogwoka	Kenya	4:22.60	
11	Lera Miller	Germany	4:23.33	
12	Tsige Teshome	Ethiopia	4:23.81	
13	Dylan McElhinney	United States	4:24.22	
14	Miriam Kibet	Kenya	4:26.80	
15	Natalija Grujić	Serbia	4:30.22	
