= 2024 World Athletics U20 Championships – Men's javelin throw =

Men's javelin throw at the 2024 World Athletics U20 Championships
- Venue: Estadio Atlético de la VIDENA
- Dates: 27 August 2024 (qualification); 29 August 2024 (final)
- Competitors: 31 from 25 nations
- Winning distance: 76.81 m

Medalists
gold medal	Tom Teršek	Slovenia
silver medal	Wang Xiaobo	China
bronze medal	Oisín Joyce	Ireland

The men's javelin throw at the 2024 World Athletics U20 Championships was held at the Estadio Atlético de la VIDENA in Lima, Peru on 27 and 29 August 2024.

== Records ==
U20 standing records prior to the 2024 World Athletics U20 Championships were as follows:

Record	Athlete & Nationality	Mark	Location	Date
World U20 Record	Neeraj Chopra (IND)	86.48	Bydgoszcz, Poland	23 July 2016
Championship Record	Neeraj Chopra (IND)	86.48	Bydgoszcz, Poland	23 July 2016
World U20 Leading	Tom Teršek (SLO)	80.87	Celje, Slovenia	29 June 2024

== Results ==
=== Qualification ===
The qualification round took place on 27 August, in two groups, with both Group A scheduled to start at 16:20 and Group B at 17:43. Athletes attaining a mark of at least 72.50 metres (Q) or at least the 12 best performers (q) qualified for the final.

==== Group A ====
Rank	Athlete	Nation	Round			Mark	Notes
Rank	Athlete	Nation	1	2	3	Mark	Notes
1	Wang Xiaobo	China	70.08	73.83		73.83	Q
2	Oskar Jäanicke	Germany	69.67	70.80	73.02	73.02	Q, PB
3	Illia Saievskyi	Ukraine	69.39	71.84	72.61	72.61	Q
4	João Fernandes	Portugal	71.04	68.05	68.30	71.04	q
5	Oisín Joyce	Ireland	66.00	69.58	69.85	69.85	q
6	Arthur Curvo	Brazil	68.74	68.22	67.72	68.74	q
7	Edward Rogan	Australia	63.96	68.21	66.30	68.21	
8	Ryan Jansen	Netherlands	67.01	68.20	64.59	68.20	
9	Cyrill Amhof	Switzerland	66.36	68.07	65.41	68.07	
10	Antonio Cannalonga	Italy	66.72	66.19	63.74	66.72	
11	Dipanshu Sharma	India	x	66.26	61.93	66.26	
12	Ides Verhulst	Belgium	62.72	63.61	63.83	63.83	
13	Lebron James	Trinidad and Tobago	62.67	59.59	62.67	62.67	
14	Niko Štajmec	Slovenia	60.68	x	x	60.68	
15	Addison James	Dominica	59.70	58.90	60.58	60.58	
16	Ewald Jansen	South Africa	59.22	56.05	57.88	59.22	

==== Group B ====
Rank	Athlete	Nation	Round			Mark	Notes
Rank	Athlete	Nation	1	2	3	Mark	Notes
1	Tom Teršek	Slovenia	72.30	73.37		73.37	Q
2	Paul Catalanatto	United States	70.29	66.46	63.94	70.29	q
3	Máté Horváth	Hungary	66.40	66.69	70.25	70.25	q
4	Yang Ke	China	66.91	70.03	x	70.03	q
5	Lucio Visca	Italy	68.64	69.71	65.49	69.71	q
6	Orlando Fernández	Venezuela	65.63	69.12	60.95	69.12	q
7	Florian Schmid	Germany	66.94	68.40	62.71	68.40	
8	Vlad Turcu	Romania	67.18	64.67	65.66	67.18	
9	Huang Chao-hung	Chinese Taipei	64.42	67.12	66.91	67.12	
10	Rohan Yadav	India	64.23	67.07	63.40	67.07	
11	Douw Botes	New Zealand	63.64	61.32	62.60	63.64	
12	Javier Noris	Cuba	62.09	63.36	62.14	63.36	
13	Stanislav Klochko	Ukraine	58.59	58.54	61.97	61.97	
14	Jeong Junseok	South Korea	58.77	61.94	60.51	61.94	
15	Yirmar Torres	Ecuador	61.12	x	61.26	61.26	

=== Final ===
Rank	Athlete	Nation	Round						Mark	Notes
Rank	Athlete	Nation	1	2	3	4	5	6	Mark	Notes
1st place, gold medalist(s)	Tom Teršek	Slovenia	69.47	66.00	70.85	68.39	73.41	76.81	76.81	
2nd place, silver medalist(s)	Wang Xiaobo	China	69.33	75.28	75.50	74.52	74.34	73.88	75.50	
3rd place, bronze medalist(s)	Oisín Joyce	Ireland	73.89	69.45	68.30	70.76	71.67	71.32	73.89	NU20R
4	Yang Ke	China	71.83	x	71.98	65.81	67.62	70.49	71.98	
5	Illia Saievskyi	Ukraine	69.15	69.56	67.60	67.71	71.73	69.54	71.73	
6	Arthur Curvo	Brazil	67.16	66.67	68.04	65.97	68.17	70.48	70.48	
7	Máté Horváth	Hungary	67.91	x	69.68	x	69.18	68.22	69.68	
8	João Fernandes	Portugal	68.98	65.42	67.49	x	67.07	x	68.98	
9	Oskar Jäanicke	Germany	64.99	65.84	66.90				66.90	
10	Lucio Visca	Italy	66.32	x	62.54				66.32	
11	Orlando Fernández	Venezuela	62.54	65.31	60.92				65.31	
12	Paul Catalanatto	United States	65.01	x	57.39				65.01	
