= Jolina Lange =

German shot putter (born 2005)

Personal information
- Nationality: German
- Born: 27 March 2005 (age 21)

Sport
- Sport: Athletics
- Event: Shot put

Achievements and titles
- Personal best(s): Shot put: 17.04 m (Bergen, 2025)
Medal record
Women's athletics
Representing Germany
European U23 Championships
Silver medal – second place	2025 Bergen	Shot put

Jolina Lange (born 27 March 2005) is a German shot putter. A German youth record holder, she was a silver medalist at the 2025 European Athletics U23 Championships.

== Early life ==
From Grethen, Saxony, she began in athletics at TSV Einheit Grimma. From 2020, she attended sports school in Chemnitz. As a 15 year-old in 2020, Lange broke a 24-year-old German junior record with the 3-kilogram shot put by 16 centimetres, landing a throw of 16.96 meters.

== Career ==
She competes domestically for LV 90 Erzgebirge. In July 2022, she had a fifth place at the 2022 European Athletics U18 Championships in Jerusalem, Israel.

She finished third in the German U20 Indoor Championships in February 2024. In July 2024, she finished second at the German U20 Championships. She subsequently competed at the 2024 World Athletics U20 Championships in Lima, Peru in the women's shot put.

She won a silver medal at the 2025 European Athletics U23 Championships in the shot put, landing a personal best throw of 17.04m, as part of a German 1-2-3 in the event, with Helena Kopp and event winner Nina Chioma Ndubuisi.
