= Bella Pasquali =

Australian athlete (born 2006)

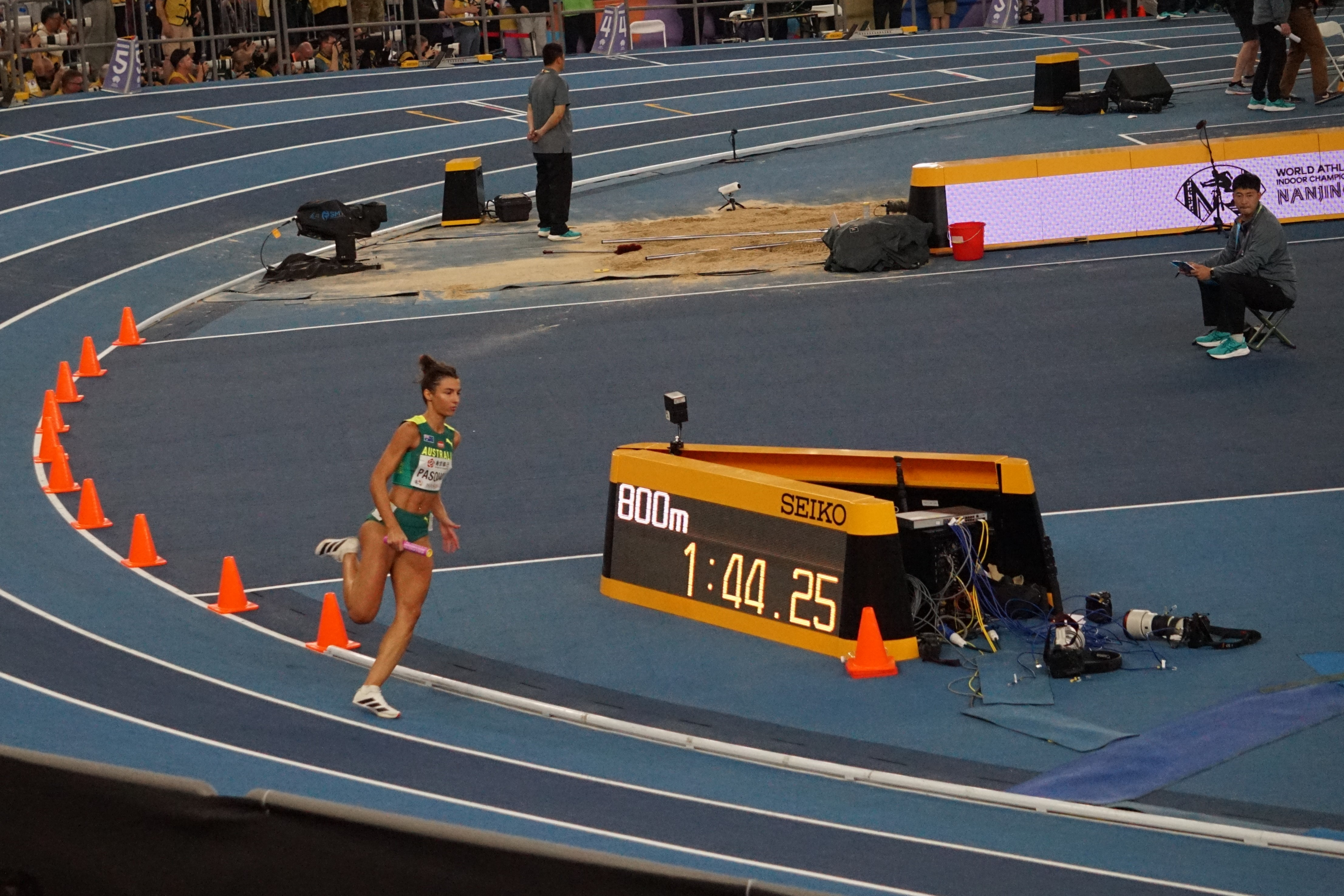
- Pasquali at the 2025 World Indoor Championships

Personal information
- Born: 4 October 2006 (age 19)

Sport
- Sport: Athletics
- Event: Sprint

Achievements and titles
- Personal best(s): 400m: 51.84s (Perth, 2025)
Medal record
Women's athletics
Representing Australia
World Indoor Championships
| Bronze medal – third place | 2025 Nanjing | 4x400 m relay |
World U20 Championships
| Gold medal – first place | 2024 Lima | 4x400 m mixed |
| Silver medal – second place | 2024 Lima | 4x400 m relay |

Bella Pasquali (born 4 October 2006) is an Australian sprinter. She was a bronze medalist in the women’s 4 x 400 metres relay at the 2025 World Athletics Championships and a double medalist at the 2024 World Athletics U20 Championships.

== Biography ==
Pasquali won the U17 400 metres title at the Australian All Schools Championship in Adelaide in December 2022. In April 2023, at the age of 16 years-old she won the Stawell Gift event in Australia. That year, she also won the Rye Gift event, part of the Victorian Athletics League.

Pasquali won gold in the mixed 4x400 metres relay and silver in the women's 4 × 400 m relay at the 2024 World Athletics U20 Championships in Lima, Peru.

Pasquali was selected for the 2025 World Athletics Indoor Championships in Nanjing in March 2025, where she won the bronze medal with the women's 4 x 400 metres relay team alongside Ella Connolly, Jemma Pollard and Ellie Beer. She finished second to Beer at the Australian Athletics Championships over 400 metres in a personal best time of 51.84 seconds on 12 April 2025.

== Personal life ==
She is from Wangaratta in Victoria. Her parents Wally and Anna were also athletes in Australia.
