= Curly Brown (discus thrower) =

German athlete (born 2006)

Personal information
- Nationality: German
- Born: 18 January 2006 (age 20)

Sport
- Sport: Athletics
- Event: Discus throw

Achievements and titles
- Personal best: Discus: 58.99m (2025)
Medal record
Women's athletics
Representing Germany
European U20 Championships
Gold medal – first place	2023 Jerusalem	Discus
Silver medal – second place	2025 Tampere	Discus
European U18 Championships
Gold medal – first place	2022 Jerusalem	Discus

Curly Brown (born 18 January 2006) is a German discus thrower. She won gold medals at the 2022 European Athletics U18 Championships and the 2023 European Athletics U20 Championships.

== Biography ==
She is from Frankfurt and competes as a member of Eintracht Frankfurt. Brown initially started competing in the shot put before switching to compete in the discus throw as well, competing for the first time in 2018. She was still competing in both events in 2021, when as a 15-year-old she was competing above her age-group at the under-18 level.

She won the gold medal in the discus throw at the 2022 European Athletics U18 Championships in Jerusalem, Israel, with a personal best throw of 50.64 metres. She won gold medal in the discus throw the following year at the 2023 European Athletics U20 Championships, again in Jerusalem, and again with a personal best; this time with 53.93 metres, and still at the age of 17 years-old. She was part of a German clean sweep of the medals in the discus at the championships, alongside Milina Wepiwé und Lea Bork.

Competing at the German Throwing Cup in Brandenburg in May 2024, she improved her personal best from 54.62 metres to 57.11 metres with her first throw, before increasing it again to 57.66m. She placed fourth in the final of the discus at the 2024 World Athletics U20 Championships in Lima, Peru with a best throw of 54.29m.

In February 2025, she won the discus throw at the German U20 Winter Throwing Championships in Halle. In May 2025, she set a personal best of 58.99 metres in the U20 discus. The throw put her into a European U20 lead going into the 2025 European Athletics U20 Championships, where she won the silver medal in Tampere.
