= Rachel Forsyth =

Canadian athlete

Personal information
- Nationality: Canadian
- Born: 14 March 2006 (age 20)

Sport
- Sport: Athletics
- Event: Middle distance running

Achievements and titles
- Personal bests: 800m: 2:06.30 (2022); 1500m: 4:17.00 (2024)
Medal record
Women's athletics
Representing Canada
World Junior Championships
Silver medal – second place	2024 Lima	1500 m

Rachel Forsyth (born 14 March 2006) is a middle-distance runner with dual American and Canadian citizenship and competes internationally for Canada. She was a silver medalist over 1500 metres at the 2024 World Athletics U20 Championships.

== Early life ==
She attended Ann Arbor Pioneer High School and competed in athletics for Purple Track Club.

== Career ==
Competing at the Champions of Champions meet hosted by the Michigan Interscholastic Track Coaches Association at Davison High School, Forsyth the fastest 800m in Michigan State high school history with a time of 2:03.87.

Forsyth won the Canadian U20 national championships over 1,500m in 2024 and set a personal best time of 4:17.00, at the Ontario Track and Field Championships in July 2024.

She won the silver medal in the 1500 metres at the 2024 World Athletics U20 Championships in Lima, Peru running a time of 4:17.94.

== Personal life ==
Forsyth is from a family of runners. Her parents Ian Forsyth and Jessica Kluge both competed at the Division 1 collegiate level at the University of Michigan. Her sisters Anne and Sarah also run. When a teenager, Forsyth had disordered eating issues that required hospital treatment.
