= Lucia Acklin =

Swiss athlete (born 2006)

Personal information
- Full name: Lucia Ursina Acklin
- Born: 25 August 2006 (age 19)

Sport
- Sport: Athletics
- Event(s): Heptathlon, Pentathlon
Medal record
Women's athletics
Representing Switzerland
World U20 Championships
Silver medal – second place	2024 Lima	Heptathlon
European Youth Olympic Festival
Gold medal – first place	2022 Banská Bystrica	Heptathlon
Silver medal – second place	2023 Maribor	Heptathlon

Lucia Ursina Acklin (born 25 August 2006) is a Swiss multi-event athlete. She was silver medalist at the 2024 World Athletics U20 Championships in the heptathlon.

== Biography ==
She won the gold medal in the heptathlon at the 2022 European Youth Summer Olympic Festival in Banská Bystrica, Slovakia. In 2023, she competed in the heptathlon at the 2023 European Youth Summer Olympic Festival in Maribor, Slovenia, winning the silver medal in the heptathlon.

Competing at the 2024 World Athletics U20 Championships in Lima, Peru in August 2024, she won a silver medal in the heptathlon in August 2024. In November 2024, she was named Swiss young athlete of the year.

Competing in senior events, she placed nineteenth overall in the season-long World Athletics Combined Events Tour for 2025.

== Personal life ==
She is from Herznach in the region of Fricktal, in the canton of Aargau. Her father Guido Acklin was a silver medalist at the 1994 Winter Olympics in the two-man bobsleigh. Her mother Doris competed in athletics in multi-event competition. Her older brother, Curdin, plays volleyball and also competed in athletics. She is the niece of former bobsledder and two-time Olympic champion Donat Acklin.
