= 2024 World Athletics U20 Championships – Women's 10,000 metres walk =

Women's 10,000 metres walk at the 2024 World Athletics U20 Championships
- Venue: Estadio Atlético de la VIDENA
- Dates: 30 August 2024 (final)
- Competitors: 35 from 25 nations
- Winning time: 43:26.60

Medalists
gold medal	Baima Zhouma	China
silver medal	Chen Meiling	China
bronze medal	Aarti Bhadana	India

The women's 10,000 metres race walk at the 2024 World Athletics U20 Championships was held at the Estadio Atlético de la VIDENA in Lima, Peru on 30 August 2024.

== Records ==
U20 standing records prior to the 2024 World Athletics U20 Championships were as follows:

Record	Athlete & Nationality	Mark	Location	Date
World U20 Record	Anežka Drahotová (CZE)	42:47.25	Eugene, United States	23 July 2014
Championship Record	Anežka Drahotová (CZE)	42:47.25	Eugene, United States	23 July 2014
World U20 Leading	Aldara Meilán (ESP)	45:06.75	La Nucia, Spain	28 June 2024

== Results ==
Key:	~ Red card for loss of contact	> Red card for bent knee

Rank	Athlete	Nation	Time	Notes
1st place, gold medalist(s)	Baima Zhouma	China	43:26.60	WU20L
2nd place, silver medalist(s)	Chen Meiling	China	44:30.67	PB
3rd place, bronze medalist(s)	Aarti Bhadana	India	44:39.39	NU20R ~ ~
4	Alessia Pop	Romania	44:54.32	NU20R ~
5	Alexandra Griffin	Australia	45:16.26	PB
6	Renata Cortes	Mexico	45:24.47	PB ~ ~
7	Michelle Cantò	Italy	45:38.85	PB
8	Chloe Le Roch	France	45:52.59	NU20R
9	Giulia Gabriele	Italy	45:54.71	PB
10	Griselda Serret	Spain	45:54.98	PB
11	Kylie Garreis	Germany	46:33.65	NU20R
12	Imen Saii	Tunisia	46:34.44	NU20R ~ ~
13	Mina Stanković	Serbia	46:38.04	NU20R
14	Suzuka Kuge	Japan	46:38.20	PB
15	Ruby Segura	Colombia	46:48.76	PB
16	Suzu Okuno	Japan	46:51.77	PB
17	Mona Ali Hussein Mohamed	Egypt	47:05.00	NU20R >
18	Alexandra Kovács	Hungary	47:11.41	
19	Chelsea Roberts	Australia	47:16.20	PB
20	Tabea Kiefer	Germany	47:25.70	PB
21	Valeria Flores	Mexico	47:41.65	SB ~
22	Ema Klimentová	Czech Republic	47:48.07	PB
23	Hiwot Ambaw	Ethiopia	48:01.86	>
24	Léna Auvray	France	48:48.10	
25	Maysaa Boughdir	Tunisia	49:12.39	SB ~
26	Lisbeth López	Guatemala	49:29.93	SB
27	Justė Perveneckaitė	Lithuania	49:46.29	>
28	Tamara Indrišková	Slovakia	49:57.77	PB
29	Yadira Orihuela	Peru	50:08.20	
30	Angelica Harris	United States	50:16.24	
31	Tülin Ek	Turkey	50:18.66	
32	Katherine Barreto	Ecuador	51:48.01	
33	Aliisa Kiiski	Finland	52:45.86	
–	Aldara Meilán	Spain	DNF	
–	Birhan Mulu	Ethiopia	DQ	TR54.7.5
