= Charlotte Henrich =

British athlete

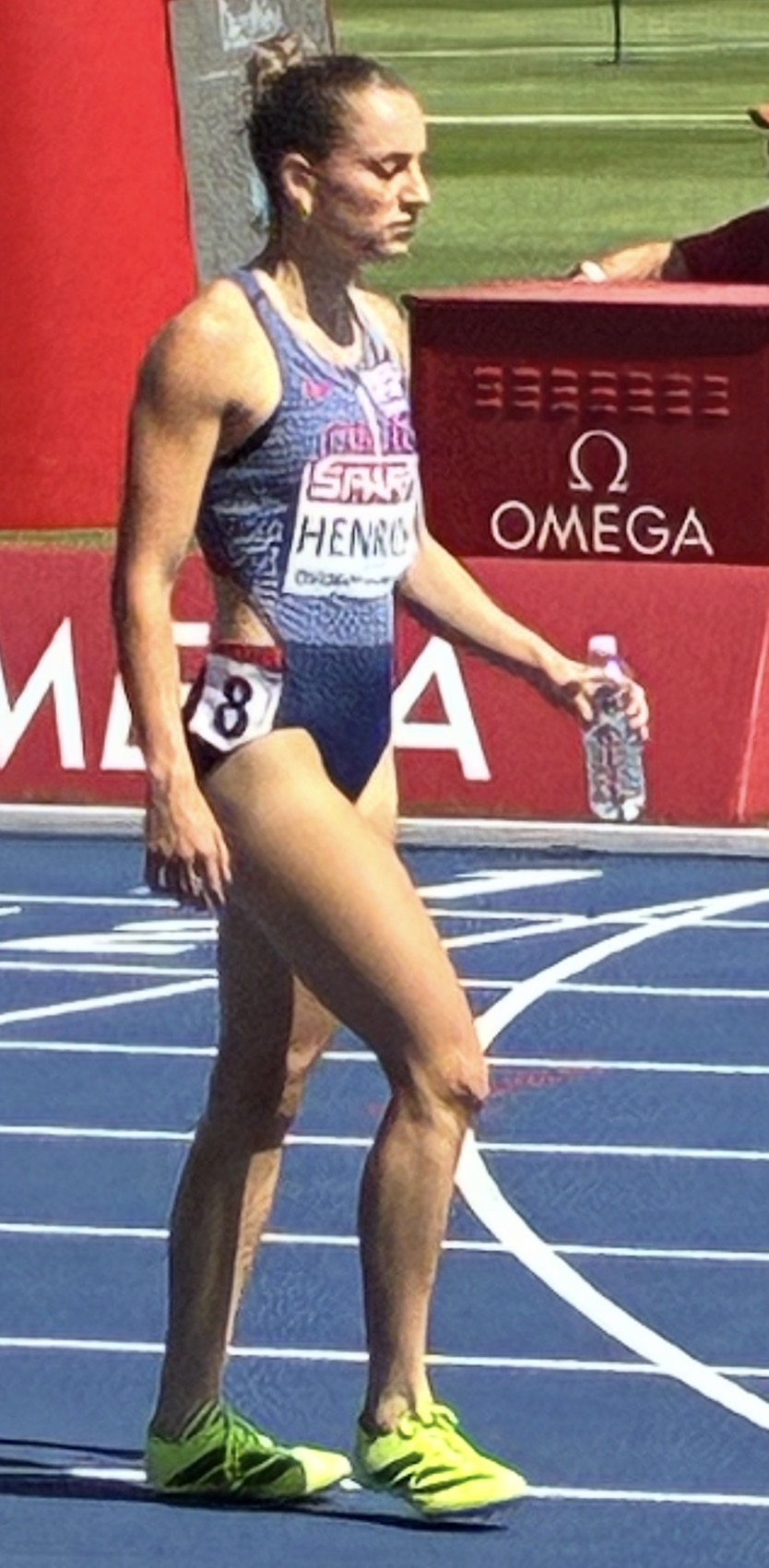
- Henrich in 2026

Personal information
- Nationality: British (Welsh)
- Born: 30 August 2006 (age 20) France

Sport
- Sport: Athletics
- Event: Sprint

Achievements and titles
- Personal bests: 400 m: 50.45 (London, 2026)
Medal record
Women's athletics
Representing Great Britain
World Ultimate Championship
Second place	2026 Budapest	Mixed 4 × 400 m relay
European Championships
Silver medal – second place	2026 Birmingham	4 × 400 m relay
Silver medal – second place	2026 Birmingham	4 × 400 m mixed
World U20 Championships
Bronze medal – third place	2024 Lima	4 × 400 m relay
European U20 Championships
Gold medal – first place	2025 Tampere	400 m
European U18 Championships
Gold medal – first place	2022 Jerusalem	400 m
Representing England
Commonwealth Youth Games
Silver medal – second place	2023 Trinbago	400 m
Silver medal – second place	2023 Trinbago	4 × 400 m mixed relay

Charlotte Henrich (born 30 August 2006) is a British sprinter who competes primarily over 400 metres. She finished third in the event at the 2026 UK Athletics Championships and sixth at the 2026 European Athletics Championships as a teenager, where she was also a double medalist in 4 × 400 metres relays. The year before, she was a gold medalist in the 400 metres at the 2025 European U20 Championships. As a 15-year-old, she won the gold medal in the 400 metres at the 2022 European Athletics U18 Championships.

== Early life ==
Henrich was born in France, moving to the United Kingdom at the age of five years-old. She attended Simon Langton Girls' Grammar School in Canterbury, Kent.

== Career ==
Henrich won the gold medal in the 400 metres at the 2022 European Athletics U18 Championships in Jerusalem at the age of 15 years-old. She won silver medals in both the individual 400 metres and in the mixed 4 × 400 m relay at the 2023 Commonwealth Youth Games, held in Trinidad and Tobago.

Henrich competed at the 2024 World Athletics U20 Championships in Lima, Peru, placing seventh in the final of the 400 metres. Later in the championships, she won the bronze medal with the British team in the women's 4 × 400 metres relay. In November 2024, she was named by British Athletics on the Olympic Futures Programme for 2025.

She set an indoor 400 m personal best of 53.94 in February 2025 whilst running in Lee Valley, London. In June 2025, she ran 52.10 seconds for the 400 metres in Regensburg, Germany, before later setting a meeting record of 52.56 to win the U20 Gala in Mannheim. In July 2025, she won the title over 400 metres at the England U20 Championships in Birmingham. That month, she lowered her personal best to 51.95 seconds at the London Olympic Stadium at the 2025 London Athletics Meet. She won the gold medal for the 400 metres at the 2025 European Athletics U20 Championships in Tampere, Finland in a new personal best of 51.68 seconds, having also ran the fastest qualifying times of all the competitors in the heats, and across the semi-finals. In October 2025, she was retained on the British Athletics Olympic Futures Programme for 2025/26. She was nominated for British under-20 female athlete of the year by Athletics Weekly in November 2025.

Henrich was named in the British squad for the 4 × 400 metres relay at the 2026 World Athletics Relays in Gaborone, Botswana. On the opening day she ran as part of the British women's 4 × 400 m team as they qualified for the final in 3:21.28, the fourth fastest recorded time by a British quartet, before placing fourth overall the following day in the final. Later that month, she won the 400 metres in a lifetime best of 51.24 seconds at the Belfast Classic, and ran 51.48 to win representing Wales at the Loughborough Invitational. In June, she placed third in the final of the 400 metres at the 2026 British Championships, winning her semi-final ahead of Keely Hodgkinson and running a personal best 50.58 seconds in the final. The time also broke the Welsh record of Michelle Scutt, which has stood since 1982. Competing at the 2026 London Athletics Meet on 18 July, she improved her personal best and Welsh record to 50.45 seconds.

Heinrich was selected as part of the Welsh team for the 2026 Commonwealth Games, placing fourth overall in the final of the 400 metres. On 10 August, she won a silver medal competing for Great Britain at the 2026 European Athletics Championships in the mixed 4 × 400 metres relay in Birmingham. She later placed sixth in the final of the women's 400 metres. In a busy championships, she also ran in the preliminary round of the women's 4 × 400 metres relay, in which Great Britain won the silver medal. In September, selected as part of the Great Britain team to compete at the inaugural World Athletics Ultimate Championship in Budapest, she ran in the mixed 4 × 400 metres relay, running the anchor leg as the team placed second overall. In October 2026, she was moved up to the confirmation level in the 2026-27 Olympic World Class Programme awarded by UK Athletics. That month, she won Female Breakthrough Athlete of the Year at the Track and Field Inclusion (TAFi) Awards.

== Athletic achievements ==
=== Personal bests ===
Type	Distance	Time (s)	Wind (m/s)	Venue	Date	Notes
Individual events
Indoor	200 metres sh	24.08	—N/a	London, United Kingdom	2 February 2025	
Indoor	300 metres sh	37.60	—N/a	Birmingham, United Kingdom	15 February 2025	
Indoor	400 metres sh	53.11	—N/a	Birmingham, United Kingdom	22 February 2025	
Outdoor	100 metres	11.60	+0.2	Crawley, United Kingdom	23 May 2026	
Outdoor	200 metres	23.50	+1.1	London, United Kingdom	26 May 2025	
Outdoor	400 metres	50.45	—N/a	London, United Kingdom	18 July 2026	
Team events
Outdoor	4 × 400 metres relay	3:21.28	—N/a	Gaborone, Botswana	2 May 2026	
Outdoor	4 × 400 metres relay Mx	3:10.47	—N/a	Birmingham, United Kingdom	10 August 2026	

=== International competitions ===
Representing Great Britain & England
Year	Competition	Venue	Position	Event	Time	Notes
2022	European U18 Championships	Jerusalem, Israel	1st	400 m	53.54	PB
2023	Commonwealth Youth Games	Port of Spain, Trinidad and Tobago	2nd	400 m	53.65	
2023	Commonwealth Youth Games	Port of Spain, Trinidad and Tobago	2nd	4 × 400 m relay Mx	3:22.29	
2024	World U20 Championships	Lima, Peru	7th	400 m	52.71	
2024	World U20 Championships	Lima, Peru	3rd	4 × 400 m relay	3:32.80	SB
2025	European U20 Championships	Tampere, Finland	1st	400 m	51.68	PB
2026	World Relays	Gaborone, Botswana	4th	4 × 400 m relay	3:22.77	
2026	Commonwealth Games	Glasgow, United Kingdom	4th	400 m	51.16	Representing Wales
2026	European Championships	Birmingham, United Kingdom	6th	400 m	51.29	
2026	European Championships	Birmingham, United Kingdom	2nd	4 × 400 m relay	3:21.68	
2026	European Championships	Birmingham, United Kingdom	2nd	4 × 400 m relay Mx	3:10.47	

=== National championships and competitions ===
Year	Competition	Venue	Position	Event	Time	Notes
2022	England Championships, U17 events	Bedford	2nd	400 m	54.54	PB
2023	England Championships, U20 events	Chelmsford	1st	400 m	54.04	SB
2024	Welsh Championships	Cardiff	1st	400 m	52.64	PB CR
2024	British Championships	Manchester	—	400 m	52.39	SB PB
2024	England Championships, U20 events	Birmingham	1st	400 m	53.34	
2025	British Indoor Championships	Birmingham	—	400 m	DNS	
2025	England Championships, U20 events	Birmingham	1st	400 m	53.14	
2026	British Championships	Birmingham	3rd	400 m	50.58	PB

== Personal life ==
Henrich was born in France, and is of Welsh descent through her mother (who comes from Carmarthen). Her first language was French. She has dyslexia, and has worked to raise Dyslexia Awareness.
