= 2024 World Athletics U20 Championships – Women's heptathlon =

Women's heptathlon at the 2024 World Athletics U20 Championships
- Venue: Estadio Atlético de la VIDENA
- Dates: 27 August 2024; 28 August 2024
- Competitors: 18 from 14 nations
- Winning points: 5807

Medalists
gold medal	Jana Koščak	Croatia
silver medal	Lucia Acklin	Switzerland
bronze medal	Adéla Tkáčová	Czech Republic

The women's heptathlon at the 2024 World Athletics U20 Championships was held at the Estadio Atlético de la VIDENA on 27 and 28 August 2024.

18 athletes from 14 countries were entered to the competition.

== Records ==
U20 standing records prior to the 2024 World Athletics U20 Championships were as follows:

Record	Athlete & Nationality	Mark	Location	Date
World U20 Record	Carolina Klüft (SWE)	6542	Munich, Germany	10 August 2002
Championship Record	Carolina Klüft (SWE)	6470	Kingston, Jamaica	20 July 2002
World U20 Leading	Jana Koščak (CRO)	5977	Rome, Italy	8 June 2024

== Results ==
The highest mark recorded in each event is highlighted in yellow

Rank	Athlete	Nationality	100m H	HJ	SP	200m	LJ	JT	800m	Points	Notes
1st place, gold medalist(s)	Jana Koščak	Croatia	13.80	1.81	12.01	25.12	5.97	40.06	2:24.56	5807	
2nd place, silver medalist(s)	Lucia Acklin	Switzerland	13.81 PB	1.63	13.42	24.42 PB	5.90 SB	42.36 PB	2:25.43 SB	5755	PB
3rd place, bronze medalist(s)	Adéla Tkáčová	Czech Republic	13.72	1.63	11.00	24.14 SB	5.49	40.93	2:16.77 PB	5601	
4	Mia Scerri	Australia	14.72	1.75 SB	13.81	25.87 SB	6.01	32.98 SB	2:23.35 SB	5550	SB
5	Eden Robinson	Great Britain	14.03 PB	1.60	12.55	24.82	5.48	40.71	2:22.42	5477	
6	Albina Zaitseva	Ukraine	14.49 SB	1.69	12.82 PB	26.29	5.65	37.88	2:26.38	5349	
7	Carmen Nowicka	Poland	14.16 PB	1.63	11.01	25.44	5.66	35.06	2:24.70	5251	
8	Elsa Puu	Estonia	14.28	1.66	11.26	26.38	5.69	36.69	2:27.38	5207	
9	Alina Chistyakova	Kazakhstan	14.26	1.75 PB	10.29	26.11	5.50	34.43 PB	2:28.95	5161	
10	Jamila Isman	Norway	14.21 PB	1.63	10.33	25.47	5.34	35.95	2:27.08	5089	
11	Emma Kathrina Hein	Estonia	15.13	1.60	12.10 PB	26.88	5.33	42.28	2:25.06	5069	
12	Irina Konichsheva	Kazakhstan	15.80 SB	1.69	10.83 PB	25.49	5.47	34.82 PB	2:22.35	5058	
13	Abigail Elmore	United States	14.85	1.69	11.91	26.73	5.46 SB	35.19 SB	2:29.72	5052	
14	Adéla Hanáková	Czech Republic	14.84	1.66	11.39	27.32	5.22	42.88	2:32.79	4976	
15	Julia Rohrer	Liechtenstein	14.51 PB	1.51	10.96	26.40	5.26	46.99	2:41.77 SB	4880	
16	Paulina Nawrot	Poland	14.52	1.57	10.29	25.22	5.57	29.33	2:38.73	4794	
–	Hilke Thamke	Germany	14.55	1.66	11.15	26.70	DNS			DNF	
–	Sarolta Kriszt	Hungary	DQ	1.60	DNS					DNF	
