= 2025 World Athletics Indoor Championships – Women's 4 × 400 metres relay =

Women's 4 × 400 metres relay at the 2025 World Athletics Indoor Championships
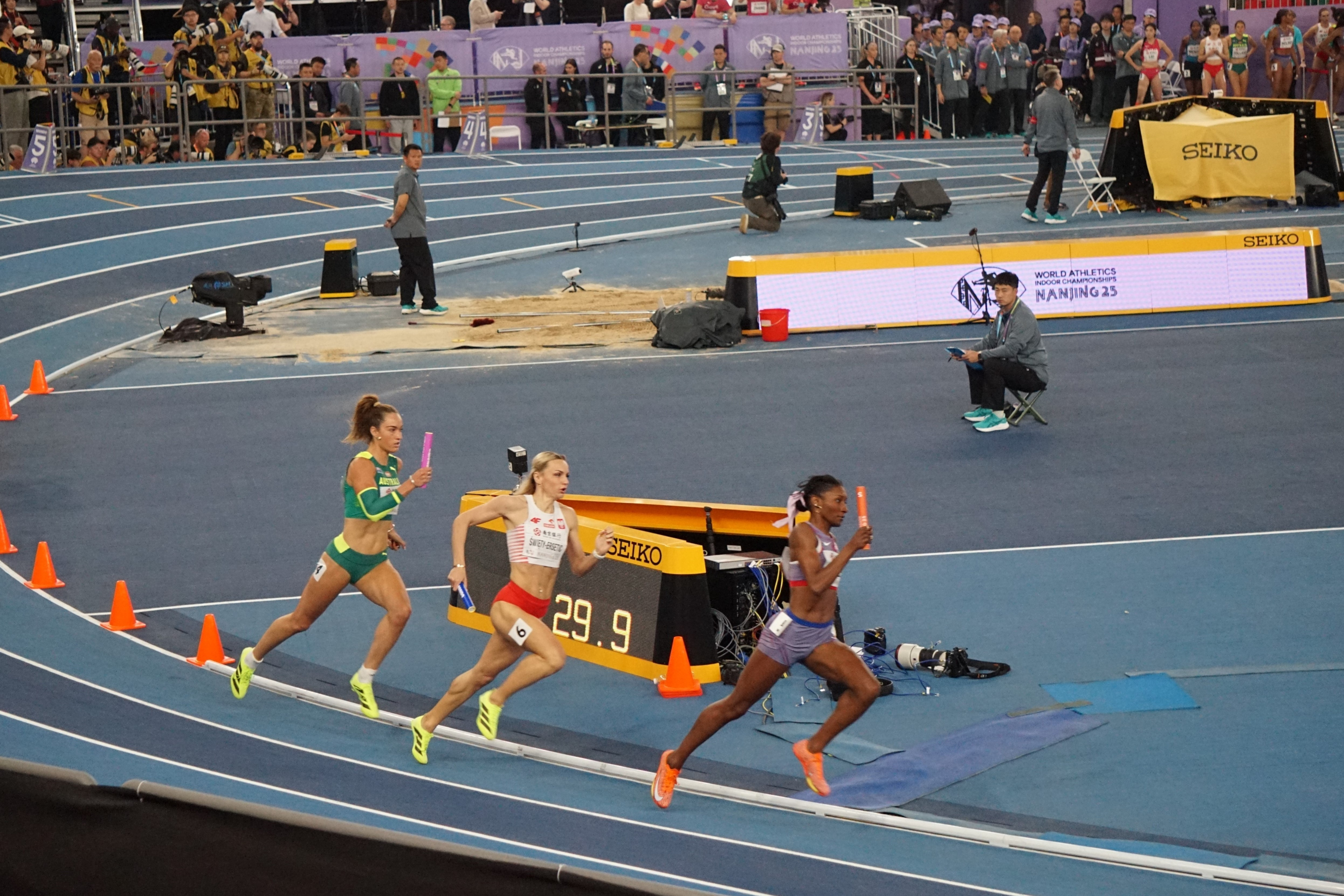
- The final underway
- Venue: Nanjing's Cube at Nanjing Youth Olympic Sports Park
- Location: Nanjing, China
- Dates: 23 March 2025
- Winning time: 3:27.45

Medalists
gold medal	Quanera Hayes; Bailey Lear; Rosey Effiong; Alexis Holmes	United States
silver medal	Justyna Święty-Ersetic; Aleksandra Formella; Anastazja Kuś; Anna Gryc	Poland
bronze medal	Ellie Beer; Ella Connolly; Bella Pasquali; Jemma Pollard	Australia

The women's 4 × 400 metres relay at the 2025 World Athletics Indoor Championships took place on the short track of the Nanjing's Cube at Nanjing Youth Olympic Sports Park in Nanjing, China, on 23 March 2025. This was the 18th time the event was contested at the World Athletics Indoor Championships.

The final took place on 23 March during the evening session.

== Background ==
The women's 4 × 400 metres relay was contested 17 times before 2025, at every edition of the World Athletics Indoor Championships since 1991.

Records before the 2025 World Athletics Indoor Championships
Record	Team	Time (s)	Location	Date
World record	Russia	3:23.37	Glasgow, United Kingdom	28 January 2006
Championship record	United States	3:23.85	Birmingham, United Kingdom	4 March 2018
World leading	Netherlands	3:24.34	Apeldoorn, Netherlands	9 March 2025

== Final ==
The final was started at 21:21 (UTC+8).

Place	Lane	Nation	Athletes	Time	Notes
1st place, gold medalist(s)	5	United States	Quanera Hayes, Bailey Lear, Rosey Effiong, Alexis Holmes	3:27.45	
2nd place, silver medalist(s)	6	Poland	Justyna Święty-Ersetic, Aleksandra Formella, Anastazja Kuś, Anna Gryc	3:32.05	SB
3rd place, bronze medalist(s)	4	Australia	Ellie Beer, Ella Connolly, Bella Pasquali, Jemma Pollard	3:32.65	SB
4	3	China	Yan Hailing, Li Fengdan, Zuo Siyu, Liu Yinglan	3:38.56	SB
5	2	Sri Lanka	Harshani Fernando, Jayeshi Uththara, Nadeesha Ramanayake, Lakshima Mendis	3:40.62	NR
