= Scottie Vines (high jumper) =

American athlete (born 2005)

Personal information
- Born: 1 November 2005 (age 20)
- Height: 6 ft 4 in (193 cm)

Sport
- Sport: Athletics
- Event: High jump

Achievements and titles
- Personal bests: High jump: 2.29m (Fayetteville, 2024)
Medal record
Men's athletics
Representing United States
World U20 Championships
Gold medal – first place	2024 Lima	High jump

Scottie Vines (born 1 November 2005) is an American high jumper. He won gold at the 2024 World Athletics U20 Championships.

== Early and personal life ==
He is from De Beque, Colorado and attended De Beque High School. He broke the Colorado high school record for the high jump. His father Scottie Vines Sr. played in the NFL as a wide receiver for the Detroit Lions. His mother Leslie Weis is a kindergarten teacher from Colorado.

== Career ==
In 2024, he won his third consecutive state title, and went on to win the USATF U20 National Championship and the Nike Outdoor Championships. He was the sole high school student to compete at the U.S. Olympic Trials, where he qualified for the final.

He won the gold medal in the high jump at the 2024 World Athletics U20 Championships in Lima, Peru on 30 August 2024 with a personal best height of 2.25 metres.

On 16 February 2025, he cleared a personal best 2.29 metres to win the Tyson Invitational in Arkansas. Competing for the University of Arkansas, Vines jumped 2.26 metres to win the high jump at the 2026 Mt. SAC Relays in California. In June, he qualified for the 2026 NCAA Outdoor Championships, placing second to Kimani Jack with a best jump of 2.25 metres, his points helping Arkansas to the team title. On 24 July, Vines placed second at the 2026 USA Outdoor Track and Field Championships in New York, clearing 2.26 metres to finish runner-up behind defending champion Tyus Wilson.
