= 2024 World Athletics U20 Championships – Women's 400 metres hurdles =

Women's 400 metres hurdles at the 2024 World Athletics U20 Championships
- Venue: Estadio Atlético de la VIDENA
- Dates: 28 August 2024 (heats); 30 August 2024 (semi-finals); 31 August 2024 (final)
- Competitors: 51 from 36 nations
- Winning time: 55.59

Medalists
gold medal	Méta Tumba	France
silver medal	Wiktoria Gadajska	Poland
bronze medal	Hannah Van Niekerk	South Africa

The women's 400 metres hurdles at the 2024 World Athletics U20 Championships was held at the Estadio Atlético de la VIDENA in Lima, Peru on 28, 30 and 31 August 2024.

== Records ==
U20 standing records prior to the 2024 World Athletics U20 Championships were as follows:

Record	Athlete & Nationality	Mark	Location	Date
World U20 Record	Sydney McLaughlin (USA)	53.60	Fayetteville, United States	27 April 2018
Championship Record	Lashinda Demus (USA)	54.70	Kingston, Jamaica	19 July 2002
World U20 Leading	Akala Garrett (USA)	57.12	Eugene, United States	6 June 2024

== Results ==
=== Heats ===
The first 3 athletes in each heat (Q) and the next 6 fastest (q) qualified to the semi-finals.

==== Heat 1 ====
Rank	Lane	Athlete	Nation	Time	Notes
1	5	Tumi Ramokgopa	South Africa	58.04	Q
2	3	Jasmine Robinson	United States	58.25	Q
3	7	Rebecca Slezáková	Slovakia	58.63	Q
4	2	Essi Niskala	Finland	58.90	q
5	8	Siena Farrell	Australia	59.58	q, PB
6	9	Uršula Černelč	Slovenia	1:00.29	
7	6	Shani Zakay	Israel	1:01.51	
8	4	Anja Dubler	Switzerland	1:01.83	

==== Heat 2 ====
Rank	Lane	Athlete	Nation	Time	Notes
1	5	Michelle Smith	United States Virgin Islands	57.85	Q
2	1	Candice Von Paulen	France	58.00	Q, PB
3	6	Zoë Laureys	Belgium	58.99	Q
4	7	Maša Garić	Bosnia and Herzegovina	59.53	q
5	9	Duna Viñals	Andorra	1:01.20	
6	2	Helen Bernard Stilling	Argentina	1:01.24	
7	8	Elise Eikeland	Norway	1:01.50	
8	4	Sofia Copiello	Italy	1:01.53	
9	3	Kei-Mahri Hanna	Bahamas	1:04.84	

==== Heat 3 ====
Rank	Lane	Athlete	Nation	Time	Notes
1	9	Mila Heikkonen	Finland	58.68	Q
2	5	Braelyn Baker	United States	59.31	Q
3	4	Viola Hambidge	Estonia	59.72	Q
4	3	Giulia Wirth	Switzerland	59.93	q
5	2	Anouk Krause-Jentsch	Germany	1:00.38	
6	7	Aki Yajima	Japan	1:01.02	
7	6	Jenna-Marie Thomas	Trinidad and Tobago	1:01.91	
8	8	Tina Polić	Croatia	1:03.42	

==== Heat 4 ====
Rank	Lane	Athlete	Nation	Time	Notes
1	6	Alesha Bennetts	Australia	59.04	Q
2	7	Kelly Ann Carr	Jamaica	1:00.61	Q
3	2	Gloria Guerrier	Haiti	1:00.65	Q
4	1	Haru Hiraki	Japan	1:00.91	
5	5	Mariangel Nuñez	Costa Rica	1:01.12	
6	3	Yalun Wang	China	1:02.04	
7	4	Cristina Coman	Romania	1:02.34	
8	9	Ana González Velásquez	El Salvador	1:03.29	PB
9	8	Eva Barbarić	Croatia	1:03.55	

==== Heat 5 ====
Rank	Lane	Athlete	Nation	Time	Notes
1	4	Méta Tumba	France	58.05	Q
2	2	Hannah Van Niekerk	South Africa	58.44	Q
3	9	Aleksandra Suchenek	Poland	59.73	Q
4	3	Shreeya Rajesh	India	1:00.07	
5	7	Mariem El Zahidi	Morocco	1:01.49	
6	5	Ximena Vasquez	Peru	1:01.59	NU20R
7	1	Amanda Da Silva	Brazil	1:02.11	
8	6	Tuyet Le Thi	Vietnam	1:03.06	
9	8	Deschanique Douglas	Jamaica	1:05.43	

==== Heat 6 ====
Rank	Lane	Athlete	Nation	Time	Notes
1	5	Wiktoria Gadajska	Poland	58.62	Q
2	9	Nina Radová	Czech Republic	59.14	Q
3	7	Petra Lalik	Hungary	59.30	Q
4	3	Mia Meringo	Estonia	59.59	q, PB
5	2	Selma Ims	Norway	59.94	q
6	8	Gal Natanel	Israel	1:00.92	
7	6	Taiwo Kudoro	Nigeria	1:01.51	
8	4	Greta Vuolo	Italy	1:01.52	

=== Semi-finals ===
First 2 of each heat (Q) plus 2 fastest times (q) qualify to Final.

==== Heat 1 ====
Rank	Lane	Athlete	Nation	Time	Notes
1	8	Méta Tumba	France	56.79	Q
2	6	Wiktoria Gadajska	Poland	57.19	Q
3	7	Hannah Van Niekerk	South Africa	57.41	q, PB
4	4	Viola Hambidge	Estonia	58.91	
5	2	Giulia Wirth	Switzerland	59.18	PB
6	9	Petra Lalik	Hungary	59.30	
7	5	Nina Radová	Czech Republic	59.34	
8	3	Siena Farrell	Australia	1:00.96	

==== Heat 2 ====
Rank	Lane	Athlete	Nation	Time	Notes
1	8	Michelle Smith	United States Virgin Islands	56.39	Q
2	7	Candice Von Paulen	France	56.81	Q, PB
3	9	Rebecca Slezáková	Slovakia	57.64	q, PB
4	5	Alesha Bennetts	Australia	57.92	SB
5	6	Braelyn Baker	United States	57.97	
6	2	Essi Niskala	Finland	59.05	
7	3	Selma Ims	Norway	59.53	
–	4	Gloria Guerrier	Haiti	DQ	TR17.2.3

==== Heat 3 ====
Rank	Lane	Athlete	Nation	Time	Notes
1	8	Jasmine Robinson	United States	57.37	Q
2	7	Mila Heikkonen	Finland	57.79	Q
3	6	Tumi Ramokgopa	South Africa	57.96	
4	9	Zoë Laureys	Belgium	58.21	SB
5	4	Aleksandra Suchenek	Poland	58.46	
6	2	Maša Garić	Bosnia and Herzegovina	58.91	NU20R
7	3	Mia Meringo	Estonia	59.81	
8	5	Kelly Ann Carr	Jamaica	1:00.33	

=== Final ===
Rank	Lane	Athlete	Nation	Time	Notes
1st place, gold medalist(s)	5	Méta Tumba	France	55.59	NU20R
2nd place, silver medalist(s)	9	Wiktoria Gadajska	Poland	56.87	NU20R
3rd place, bronze medalist(s)	3	Hannah Van Niekerk	South Africa	56.98	PB
4	6	Michelle Smith	United States Virgin Islands	57.21	
5	8	Candice Von Paulen	France	57.34	
6	4	Mila Heikkonen	Finland	57.64	
7	2	Rebecca Slezáková	Slovakia	59.23	
–	7	Jasmine Robinson	United States	DQ	TR22.6.1
