= Hannah van Niekerk =

South African athlete (born 2005)

Personal information
- Nationality: South African
- Born: 28 January 2005 (age 21)

Sport
- Sport: Athletics
- Event: 400m hurdles

Achievements and titles
- Personal best(s): 400m: 52.72 (Gaborone, 2025); 400 mH: 56.16 (Bochum, 2025)
Medal record
Women's athletics
Representing South Africa
World U20 Championships
Bronze medal – third place	2024 Lima	400 m hurdles

Hannah van Niekerk (born 28 January 2005) is a South African hurdler. She won the bronze medal at the 2024 World Athletics U20 Championships in the 400 metres hurdles.

== Early life ==
From Boksburg, she attended Afrikaans Hoër Meisieskool in Pretoria as well as the University of Pretoria.

== Career ==
Racing in Belgium in June 2024, she lowered her personal best for the 400 metres hurdles to 58.21 seconds.

She won bronze in the 400m hurdles at the 2024 World Athletics U20 Championships in Lima, Peru in August 2024. At the games she lowered her personal net to 56.98 seconds.

On 12 April 2025, she ran her personal best of 52.72 seconds in the 400m at the FNB Botswana Golden Grand Prix in Gaborone, Botswana. She competed at the 2025 World Athletics Relays in China in the Mixed 4 × 400 metres relay in May 2025 as the South African team placed fifth in the final. She ran her personal best of 56.16 seconds in the 400m hurdles, winning her semi-final at the 2025 Summer World University Games in Bochum, Germany, before placing seventh overall.

She was selected for the 2025 World Athletics Championships in Tokyo, Japan, where she ran in the women's x 400 metres relay.

On 18 April 2026 she was runner-up to Rogail Joseph in the 400 m hurdles title at the 2026 South African Championships, running 56.64 seconds. In May, she ran at the 2026 World Athletics Relays in the women's 4 × 400 metres relay in Gaborone, Botswana.
