= 2024 World Athletics U20 Championships – Women's shot put =

Women's shot put at the 2024 World Athletics U20 Championships
- Venue: Estadio Atlético de la VIDENA
- Dates: 30 August 2024 (qualification & final)
- Competitors: 25 from 20 nations
- Winning distance: 17.34 m

Medalists
gold medal	Akaoma Odeluga	United States
silver medal	Martina Mazurová	Czech Republic
bronze medal	Chiang Ching-yuan	Chinese Taipei

The women's shot put at the 2024 World Athletics U20 Championships was held at the Estadio Atlético de la VIDENA in Lima, Peru on 30 August 2024.

== Records ==
U20 standing records prior to the 2024 World Athletics U20 Championships were as follows:

Record	Athlete & Nationality	Mark	Location	Date
World U20 Record	Astrid Kumbernuss (GDR)	20.54	Orimattila, Finland	1 July 1989
Championship Record	Cheng Xiaoyan (CHN)	18.76	Lisbon, Portugal	21 July 1994
World U20 Leading	Ashley Erasmus (RSA)	18.17	Douala, Cameroon	24 June 2024

== Results ==
=== Qualification ===
Athletes attaining a mark of at least 15.80 metres (Q) or at least the 12 best performers (q) qualified for the final.

==== Group A ====
Rank	Athlete	Nation	Round			Mark	Notes
Rank	Athlete	Nation	1	2	3	Mark	Notes
1	Akaoma Odeluga	United States	x	16.55		16.55	Q
2	Martina Mazurová	Czech Republic	14.71	16.13		16.13	Q, PB
3	Chiang Ching-yuan	Chinese Taipei	15.76	15.25	15.87	15.87	Q
4	Minttu Laurila	Finland	14.20	14.64	15.37	15.37	q
5	Marley Raikiwasa	Australia	x	14.24	14.63	14.63	q
6	Alicia Khunou	South Africa	14.41	14.57	14.55	14.57	q
7	Tian Xinyi	China	14.18	14.45	14.39	14.45	q
8	Sojin Park	South Korea	14.23	13.94	x	14.23	
9	Maria Rafailidou	Greece	14.22	13.79	14.19	14.22	
10	Mia Feer	Switzerland	13.63	13.83	14.12	14.12	
11	Chantal Rimke	Germany	x	13.77	14.09	14.09	
12	Beatrice Pettersson	Sweden	13.70	13.93	13.77	13.93	
13	Cleo Agyepong	Great Britain	13.48	13.41	12.87	13.48	

==== Group B ====
Rank	Athlete	Nation	Round			Mark	Notes
Rank	Athlete	Nation	1	2	3	Mark	Notes
1	Xylavene Beale	Australia	14.87	15.30	15.03	15.30	q
2	Lin Jiaxin	China	15.15	15.25	14.68	15.25	q
3	Anhelina Shepel	Ukraine	14.65	x	x	14.65	q
4	Belsy Quiñonez	Ecuador	13.81	13.15	14.63	14.63	q
5	Ilektra Chioutakakou	Greece	13.61	13.90	14.54	14.54	q
6	Gracelyn Leiseth	United States	14.42	14.30	x	14.42	
7	Tamanna	India	x	14.03	12.26	14.03	
8	Edimara de Jesus	Brazil	x	x	13.82	13.82	
9	Vesna Kljajević	Montenegro	x	13.20	13.72	13.72	
10	Giada Cabai	Italy	13.60	13.71	13.41	13.71	
11	Anđela Obradović	Serbia	13.62	13.64	12.75	13.64	
12	Jolina Lange	Germany	x	13.31	x	13.31	

=== Final ===
Rank	Athlete	Nation	Round						Mark	Notes
Rank	Athlete	Nation	1	2	3	4	5	6	Mark	Notes
1st place, gold medalist(s)	Akaoma Odeluga	United States	15.85	x	15.77	17.34	x	x	17.34	
2nd place, silver medalist(s)	Martina Mazurová	Czech Republic	16.38	x	15.56	x	16.34	15.83	16.38	PB
3rd place, bronze medalist(s)	Chiang Ching-yuan	Chinese Taipei	16.01	16.01	x	15.77	x	x	16.01	NU20R
4	Lin Jiaxin	China	14.45	14.74	15.39	14.86	14.56	x	15.39	
5	Xylavene Beale	Australia	14.35	14.56	15.38	14.15	14.57	14.66	15.38	
6	Tian Xinyi	China	14.61	14.75	15.15	x	x	13.81	15.15	
7	Marley Raikiwasa	Australia	14.97	x	14.65	14.88	x	x	14.97	
8	Anhelina Shepel	Ukraine	14.31	14.95	14.42	13.32	14.15	14.87	14.95	
9	Alicia Khunou	South Africa	14.04	14.20	14.68				14.68	
10	Minttu Laurila	Finland	14.39	14.64	14.39				14.64	
11	Belsy Quiñonez	Ecuador	14.12	14.49	13.63				14.49	
12	Ilektra Chioutakakou	Greece	12.64	13.95	14.43				14.43	
