= 2024 World Athletics U20 Championships – Women's discus throw =

Women's discus throw at the 2024 World Athletics U20 Championships
- Venue: Estadio Atlético de la VIDENA
- Dates: 27 August 2024 (qualification); 28 August 2024 (final)
- Competitors: 31 from 25 nations
- Winning distance: 57.57 m

Medalists
gold medal	Han Bingyang	China
silver medal	Huang Jingru	China
bronze medal	Marley Raikiwasa	Australia

The women's discus throw at the 2024 World Athletics U20 Championships was held at the Estadio Atlético de la VIDENA in Lima, Peru on 27 and 28 August 2024.

== Records ==
U20 standing records prior to the 2022 World Athletics U20 Championships were as follows:

Record	Athlete & Nationality	Mark	Location	Date
World U20 Record	Ilke Wyludda (GDR)	74.40	East Berlin, East Germany	13 September 1988
Championship Record	Ilke Wyludda (GDR)	68.24	Sudbury, Canada	31 July 1988
World U20 Leading	Jiang Zhichao (CHN)	64.49	Neubrandenburg, Germany	22 May 2024

== Results ==
=== Qualification ===
Athletes attaining a mark of at least 53.00 metres (Q) or at least the 12 best performers (q) qualified for the final.

==== Group A ====
Rank	Athlete	Nation	Round			Mark	Notes
Rank	Athlete	Nation	1	2	3	Mark	Notes
1	Huang Jingru	China	56.45			56.45	Q
2	Curly Brown	Germany	52.29	x	x	52.29	q
3	Chiang Ching-yuan	Chinese Taipei	48.78	50.15	52.28	52.28	q
4	Gracelyn Leiseth	United States	44.75	42.15	49.79	49.79	q
5	Helene Ramslien	Norway	43.51	49.50	x	49.50	q
6	Ghofrane Lahmedi	Tunisia	48.85	x	x	48.85	
7	Chelsy Wayne	Australia	x	48.81	48.13	48.81	
8	Suzannah Kennelly	New Zealand	43.75	x	48.17	48.17	
9	Yee Hye-min	South Korea	47.05	47.62	x	47.62	
10	Tindra Törnestam	Sweden	46.55	47.59	x	47.59	
11	Daniela Fernández	Spain	x	47.38	45.71	47.38	
12	Najhada Seymoure	Jamaica	47.24	47.24	x	47.24	
13	Neilyn Rodríguez	Cuba	x	46.50	x	46.50	
14	Princesse Hyman	France	46.38	x	46.44	46.44	
15	Nikita Kumari	India	45.38	x	x	45.38	
16	Ana Ellison-Lupena	Cook Islands	x	x	38.82	38.82	

==== Group B ====
Rank	Athlete	Nation	Round			Mark	Notes
Rank	Athlete	Nation	1	2	3	Mark	Notes
1	Han Bingyang	China	55.64			55.64	Q
2	Julia Tunks	Canada	x	53.45		53.45	Q
3	Marley Raikiwasa	Australia	52.47	x	x	52.47	q
4	Ottaynis Febres	Venezuela	51.03	44.99	48.66	51.03	q, NU20R
5	Reese Garland	United States	45.20	x	50.31	50.31	q
6	Anne Juul Jensen	Denmark	50.25	47.01	48.37	50.25	q, SB
7	Amanat Kamboj	India	45.48	42.01	49.98	49.98	q
8	Samanta Lopes	Brazil	47.64	48.97	x	48.97	
9	Hera Christensen	Iceland	47.69	48.43	47.02	48.43	
10	Karyna Avramenko	Ukraine	46.05	45.86	44.94	46.05	
11	Alicia Khunou	South Africa	x	45.21	45.78	45.78	
12	Giada Brown	Switzerland	44.63	45.68	x	45.68	
13	Shamoyea Morris	Jamaica	43.82	x	x	43.82	
14	Calea Jackson	Bahamas	x	41.60	43.62	43.62	
–	Nadjela Wepiwe	Germany	x	x	x	NM	

=== Final ===
Rank	Athlete	Nation	Round						Mark	Notes
Rank	Athlete	Nation	1	2	3	4	5	6	Mark	Notes
1st place, gold medalist(s)	Han Bingyang	China	46.77	57.57	52.99	56.73	54.86	51.60	57.57	PB
2nd place, silver medalist(s)	Huang Jingru	China	54.33	53.90	55.24	56.47	55.62	55.07	56.47	
3rd place, bronze medalist(s)	Marley Raikiwasa	Australia	x	54.92	53.84	50.41	56.25	x	56.25	
4	Curly Brown	Germany	47.97	x	54.29	52.40	51.06	x	54.29	
5	Gracelyn Leiseth	United States	48.08	52.87	x	50.66	49.16	52.00	52.87	
6	Chiang Ching-yuan	Chinese Taipei	48.60	52.57	49.55	49.05	51.03	x	52.57	
7	Julia Tunks	Canada	45.72	52.56	51.01	50.11	x	x	52.56	
8	Ottaynis Febres	Venezuela	48.47	51.43	50.92	44.45	48.82	49.29	51.43	NU20R
9	Reese Garland	United States	49.47	x	50.56				50.56	
10	Amanat Kamboj	India	48.46	50.06	x				50.06	
11	Anne Juul Jensen	Denmark	48.11	45.58	44.12				48.11	
12	Helene Ramslien	Norway	47.33	x	46.58				47.33	
