= Rebecca Grieve =

Scottish sprinter (born 2005)

Personal information
- Nationality: Scottish
- Born: 30 January 2005 (age 21) Currie, Edinburgh, Scotland
- Height: 1.63 m (5 ft 4 in)
- Weight: 57 kg (126 lb; 9 st 0 lb)

Sport
- Sport: Athletics
- Event: Sprint

Achievements and titles
- Personal bests: 200m: 23.39 (2026); 400m: 51.71 (2026)
Medal record
Women's athletics
Representing Great Britain
European U23 Championships
Gold medal – first place	2025 Bergen	4x400 m relay
World U20 Championships
Bronze medal – third place	2024 Lima	4x400 m relay
European U18 Championships
Gold medal – first place	2022 Jerusalem	Medley relay

Rebecca Grieve (born 30 January 2005) is a Scottish sprinter who competes predominantly over 400 metres.

== Early life ==
From Currie in Scotland, she started athletics at the age of eight years-old and competing at nine. She was a member of Edinburgh Athletics and won the Scottish U20 title as a 15 year-old. She also raced for Pitreavie ACC and Woodford Green Ladies. She attended the University of New Mexico in the United States to study biology.

== Career ==
In August 2021, she was part of a Scottish 4x400 metres relay team that set a new Scottish U20 record racing in Manchester.

She won a gold medal in the medley relay at the 2022 European Athletics U18 Championships in Jerusalem in July 2022. That year, she was the number one Scottish athlete in her age-group over 200 metres and 400 metres.

She competed at the 2024 World Athletics U20 Championships in Lima, Peru. Taking part in the 4 x 400 metres relay, she ran the second fastest leg of all competitors (52.86 seconds) as Britain qualified for the final. In the final, she ran as the British team won the bronze medal.

She was named in the British team for the 2025 European Athletics U23 Championships in Bergen, placing eighth in the final of the 400 metres. Later in the championships, she ran as part of the gold medal winning British 4 x 400 metres relay team, helping set a championship record time of 3:26.52.

Competing in Albuquerque in January 2026, Grieve ran the second-fastest 600m Indoor race in collegiate history, with a time of 1:25.06. The following month, she ran below 52 seconds for the 400 metres indoors for the first time with 51.91 and 51.71 seconds in New Mexico. In June, she reached the final of the 400 metres at the 2026 British Championships, placing seventh overall.

Grieve was named in the Scottish team for the 2026 Commonwealth Games in Glasgow, competing in the mixed 4 × 400 m relay at the Games.
