= Acklin =

Acklin is a surname. Notable people with the surname include:

- Barbara Acklin (1943–1998), American soul singer
- Donat Acklin (born 1965), Swiss bobsledder
- Guido Acklin (born 1969), Swiss bobsledder

== See also ==
- Acklins, an island and district of the Bahamas
