= 2024 World Athletics U20 Championships =

International athletics competition

- Host city: Lima, Peru
- Events: 45
- Dates: 27–31 August 2024
- Main venue: Estadio Atlético de la VIDENA
- Website: worldathletics.org

The 2024 World Athletics U20 Championships, also known colloquially by its former official title, the World Junior Championships, was an international athletics competition for athletes qualifying as juniors (born no earlier than 1 January 2005). The event was staged in Lima, Peru from 27 to 31 August 2024. On 5 April 2023 it was announced that the city had initially withdrawn as a host of the 2024 World Athletics U20 Championships due to "recent political instability, social unrest and natural disasters". On 14 August 2023, Lima was reinstated as host city for the event as all the issues were stabilised.

== Schedule ==
| Q | Qualification | H | Heats | S | Semifinals | F | Final |
M = morning session, A = afternoon session

Men
| Date → | 27 Aug | | 28 Aug | | 29 Aug | | 30 Aug | | 31 Aug |
| Event ↓ | M | A | M | A | M | A | M | A | A |
|---|---|---|---|---|---|---|---|---|---|
| 100 m | H | S | | F | | | | | |
| 200 m | | | | | H | S | | F | |
| 400 m | | | H | S | | F | | | |
| 800 m | H | | | | | S | | F | |
| 1500 m | | | | H | | | | | F |
| 3000 m | | | | | | F | | | |
| 5000 m | | F | | | | | | | |
| 3000 m SC | | | H | | | | | | F |
| 110 m hurdles | | | | | H | S | | F | |
| 400 m hurdles | | | H | | | | | S | F |
| Decathlon | | | | | F | | | | |
| High jump | | | Q | | | | | F | |
| Pole vault | | | | Q | | | | F | |
| Long jump | | | | | Q | | | F | |
| Triple jump | Q | | | | | F | | | |
| Shot put | Q | F | | | | | | | |
| Discus throw | | | | | | | Q | | F |
| Hammer throw | Q | | | | | F | | | |
| Javelin throw | | Q | | | | F | | | |
| 10,000 m walk | | | | | | | F | | |
| 4 × 100 m relay | | | | | | | H | | F |
| 4 × 400 m relay | | | | | | | H | | F |

Women
| Date → | 27 Aug | | 28 Aug | | 29 Aug | | 30 Aug | | 31 Aug |
| Event ↓ | M | A | M | A | M | A | M | A | A |
|---|---|---|---|---|---|---|---|---|---|
| 100 m | H | S | | F | | | | | |
| 200 m | | | | | H | S | | F | |
| 400 m | | | H | S | | F | | | |
| 800 m | H | | | | | S | | F | |
| 1500 m | | | | H | | | | | F |
| 3000 m | | | | | H | | | F | |
| 5000 m | | F | | | | | | | |
| 3000 m SC | | H | | | | F | | | |
| 100 m hurdles | | | | | H | S | | F | |
| 400 m hurdles | | | H | | | | | S | F |
| Heptathlon | F | | | | | | | | |
| High jump | | | | | Q | | | | F |
| Pole vault | | Q | | | | F | | | |
| Long jump | Q | | | F | | | | | |
| Triple jump | | | Q | | | | | | F |
| Shot put | | | | | | | Q | F | |
| Discus throw | Q | | | F | | | | | |
| Hammer throw | | | | | Q | | | | F |
| Javelin throw | | | Q | | | | | F | |
| 10,000 m walk | | | | | | | F | | |
| 4 × 100 m relay | | | | | | | H | | F |
| 4 × 400 m relay | | | | | | | H | | F |

Mixed
| Date → | 27 Aug | | 28 Aug | | 29 Aug | | 30 Aug | | 31 Aug |
| Event ↓ | M | A | M | A | M | A | M | A | A |
|---|---|---|---|---|---|---|---|---|---|
| 4 × 400 m relay | H | F | | | | | | | |

Event schedule
DAY ONE—TUESDAY, AUGUST 27TH
| PET Time (UTC−5) | DIVISION | EVENT | Round |
| 09:35 | X | 4×400 Metres Relay | Heats |
| 10:10 | W | 100 Metres | Heats |
| 11:10 | M | 100 Metres | Heats |
| 12:10 | M | 800 Metres | Heats |
| 13:05 | W | 800 Metres | Heats |
| 16:00 | W | 3000 Metres Steeplechase | Heats |
| 16:45 | W | 100 Metres | Semi-Final |
| 17:07 | M | 100 Metres | Semi-Final |
| 17:30 | W | 5000 Metres | Final |
| 17:55 | M | 5000 Metres | Final |
| 18:50 | X | 4 × 400 Metres Relay | Final |
Heptathlon
| 09:05 | W | 100 Metres Hurdles | Heptathlon |
| 10:10 | W | High Jump | Heptathlon |
| 16:05 | W | Shot Put | Heptathlon |
| 18:25 | W | 200 Metres | Heptathlon |
Field Events
| 09:00 | M | Hammer Throw (6 kg) | Qualification - Group A |
| 09:15 | W | Long Jump | Qualification |
| 10:15 | M | Hammer Throw (6 kg) | Qualification - Group B |
| 11:00 | M | Shot Put (6 kg) | Qualification |
| 11:35 | W | Discus Throw | Qualification - Group A |
| 12:05 | M | Triple Jump | Qualification |
| 13:00 | W | Discus Throw | Qualification - Group B |
| 16:00 | W | Pole Vault | Qualification |
| 16:20 | M | Javelin Throw (700g) | Qualification - Group A |
| 17:35 | M | Shot Put (6 kg) | Final |
| 17:40 | M | Javelin Throw (700g) | Qualification - Group B |
END OF DAY ONE
DAY TWO—WEDNESDAY, AUGUST 28TH
| 09:10 | W | 400 Metres Hurdles | Heats |
| 10:05 | M | 400 Metres Hurdles | Heats |
| 11:05 | W | 400 Metres | Heats |
| 12:00 | M | 400 Metres | Heats |
| 12:50 | M | 3000 Metres Steeplechase | Heats |
| 16:05 | M | 1500 Metres | Heats |
| 16:40 | W | 1500 Metres | Heats |
| 17:20 | M | 400 Metres | Semi-Final |
| 17:45 | W | 400 Metres | Semi-Final |
| 18:30 | W | 100 Metres | Final |
| 18:47 | M | 100 Metres | Final |
Heptathlon
| 09:40 | W | Long Jump | Heptathlon |
| 12:05 | W | Javelin Throw | Heptathlon |
| 18:10 | W | 800 Metres | Heptathlon |
Field Events
| 09:00 | W | Javelin Throw | Qualification - Group A |
| 10:30 | M | High Jump | Qualification |
| 10:35 | W | Javelin Throw | Qualification - Group B |
| 11:50 | W | Triple Jump | Qualification |
| 16:29 | W | Discus Throw Final | |
| 17:20 | W | Long Jump | Final |
END OF DAY TWO
DAY THREE—THURSDAY, AUGUST 29TH
| 09:00 | M | 100 Metres | Decathlon U20 |
| 09:25 | W | 100 Metres Hurdles | Heats |
| 10:20 | M | 110 m Hurdles (99.0 cm) | Heats |
| 11:15 | W | 200 Metres | Heats |
| 12:10 | M | 200 Metres | Heats |
| 15:00 | W | 100 Metres Hurdles | Semi-Final |
| 15:30 | M | 110m Hurdles (99.0 cm) | Semi-Final |
| 15:55 | W | 800 Metres | Semi-Final |
| 16:20 | M | 800 Metres | Semi-Final |
| 16:47 | W | 200 Metres | Semi-Final |
| 17:10 | M | 200 Metres | Semi-Final |
| 17:35 | W | 3000 Metres Steeplechase | Final |
| 17:55 | M | 400 Metres | Decathlon U20 |
| 18:15 | M | 3000 Metres | Final |
| 18:43 | W | 400 Metres | Final |
| 18:50 | M | 400 Metres | Final |
Field Events
| 09:10 | W | Hammer Throw | Qualification - Group A |
| 10:25 | W | Hammer Throw | Qualification - Group B |
| 11:05 | W | High Jump | Qualification |
| 11:45 | M | Long Jump | Qualification |
| 15:25 | M | Hammer Throw (6 kg) | Final |
| 16:00 | W | Pole Vault | Final |
| 17:20 | M | Triple Jump | Final |
| 17:30 | M | Javelin Throw (700g) | Final |
Decathlon
| 09:00 | M | 100 Metre | Decathlon U20 |
| 09:35 | M | Long Jump | Decathlon U20 |
| 11:10 | M | Shot Put (6 kg) | Decathlon U20 |
| 15:50 | M | High Jump | Decathlon U20 |
| 17:55 | M | 400 Metres | Decathlon U20 |
END OF DAY THREE
DAY FOUR—FRIDAY, AUGUST 30TH
| 09:00 | M | 110 m Hurdles (99.0 cm) | Decathlon U20 |
| 09:25 | M | 10,000 Metres Race Walk | Final |
| 10:25 | W | 10,000 Metres Race Walk | Final |
| 11:30 | W | 4×400 Metres Relay | Heats |
| 12:00 | M | 4 × 400 Metres Relay | Heats |
| 12:35 | W | 4 × 100 Metres Relay | Heats |
| 13:05 | M | 4 × 100 Metres Relay | Heats |
| 15:35 | W | 400 Metres Hurdles | Semi-Final |
| 16:05 | M | 400 Metres Hurdles | Semi-Final |
| 16:35 | M | 800 Metres | Final |
| 16:50 | W | 800 Metres | Final |
| 17:10 | W | 100 Metres Hurdles | Final |
| 17:25 | M | 110 m Hurdles (99.0 cm) | Final |
| 17:50 | W | 3000 Metres | Final |
| 18:15 | M | 1500 Metres | Decathlon U20 |
| 18:35 | W | 200 Metres | Final |
| 18:50 | M | 200 Metres | Final |
Decathlon
| 09:00 | M | 110 m Hurdles (99.0 cm) | Decathlon U20 |
| 09:40 | M | Discus Throw (1.750 kg) | Decathlon - Group A |
| 10:50 | M | Discus Throw (1.750 kg) | Decathlon - Group B |
| 11:35 | M | Pole Vault | Decathlon - Group A |
| 12:25 | M | Pole Vault | Decathlon - Group B |
| 15:30 | M | Javelin Throw | Decathlon - Group A |
| 16:35 | M | Javelin Throw | Decathlon - Group B |
| 18:15 | M | 1500 Metres | Decathlon U20 |
Field Events
| 09:20 | W | Shot Put | Qualification |
| 11:55 | M | Discus Throw (1.750 kg) | Qualification - Group A |
| 13:05 | M | Discus Throw (1.750 kg) | Qualification - Group B |
| 16:00 | M | Pole Vault | Final |
| 16:10 | W | Shot Put | Final |
| 16:55 | M | High Jump | Final |
| 17:15 | M | Long Jump | Final |
| 17:45 | W | Javelin Throw | Final |
END OF DAY FOUR
DAY FIVE—SATURDAY, AUGUST 31ST
| 16:35 | W | 400 Metres Hurdles | Final |
| 16:45 | M | 400 Metres Hurdles | Final |
| 17:00 | W | 1500 Metres | Final |
| 17:15 | M | 3000 Metres Steeplechase | Final |
| 17:45 | W | 4 × 100 Metres Relay | Final |
| 17:55 | M | 4 × 100 Metres Relay | Final |
| 18:10 | M | 1500 Metres | Final |
| 18:30 | W | 4 × 400 Metres Relay | Final |
| 18:50 | M | 4 × 400 Metres Relay | Final |
Field Events
| 16:00 | M | Discus Throw (1.750 kg) | Final |
| 16:25 | W | High Jump | Final |
| 17:10 | W | Triple Jump | Final |
| 17:40 | W | Hammer Throw | Final |
END OF DAY FIVE

== Qualifying Standards ==
| Event | Men | Women |
|---|---|---|
| 100 m | 10.55 | 11.78 |
| 200 m | 21.35 | 24.35 |
| 400 m | 47.65 | 54.40 |
| 800 m | 1:50.50 | 2:09.00 |
| 1500 m | 3:48.00 | 4:27.50 |
| 3000 m | 8:07.00 | 9:32.00 |
| 5000 m | 14:08.00 | 16:30.00 |
| 3000 m sc | 9:02.00 | 10:38.00 |
| 100 mH | – | 14.20 |
| 110 mH | 14.20; 00.991 | – |
| 400 mH | 53.20 | 61.00 |
| 10,000 m RW | 43:50.00 | 49:30.00 |
| 4 × 100 m Relay | No standard | No standard |
| 4 × 400 m Relay | No standard | No standard |
| 4 × 400 m Mixed Relay | No standard | No standard |
| Heptathlon | – | 5300 points |
| Decathlon | 7080 points | – |
| High Jump | 2.13 | 1.80 |
| Pole Vault | 5.10 | 4.00 |
| Long Jump | 7.56 | 6.20 |
| Triple Jump | 15.50 | 12.90 |
| Shot Put | 18.20 (6 kg) | 14.50 (4 kg) |
| Discus | 55.50 | 49.00 |
| Hammer | 67.50 (6 kg) | 57.50 |
| Javelin | 68.00 | 49.50 |

== Men's results ==
| Event | Gold | | Silver | | Bronze | |
|---|---|---|---|---|---|---|
| 100 metres (Wind: -0.9 m/s) | Bayanda Walaza; South Africa | 10.19 | Puripol Boonson; Thailand | 10.22 | Bradley Nkoana; South Africa | 10.26 |
| 200 metres (Wind: -0.7 m/s) | Bayanda Walaza; South Africa | 20.52 | Gout Gout; Australia | 20.60 | Jake Odey-Jordan; Great Britain | 20.81 SB |
| 400 metres | Udeme Okon; South Africa | 45.69 | Jayden Davis; United States | 46.08 | Sidi Njie; United States | 46.29 |
| 800 metres | General Ayansa; Ethiopia | 1:46.86 | Peyton Craig; Australia | 1:46.95 | Ko Ochiai; Japan | 1:47.03 |
| 1500 metres | Abdisa Fayisa; Ethiopia | 3:40.51 | Cameron Myers; Australia | 3:40.60 | Alex Pintado; Spain | 3:41.03 |
| 3000 metres | Andreas Halvorsen; Norway | 8:20.56 | Denis Kipkoech; Kenya | 8:20.79 | Edward Bird; Great Britain | 8:21.00 |
| 5000 metres | Andrew Alamisi; Kenya | 13:41.14 | Abdisa Fayisa; Ethiopia | 13:41.56 | Keneth Kiprop; Uganda | 13:41.73 SB |
| 110 metres hurdles (Wind: -0.5 m/s) | Ja'Kobe Tharp; United States | 13.05 WU20L | Andre Korbmacher; United States | 13.14 PB | Yuanjiang Chen; China | 13.21 NU20R |
| 400 metres hurdles | Vance Nilsson; United States | 49.26 WU20L | Michal Rada; Czech Republic | 49.30 NU20R | Antti Sainio; Finland | 49.61 |
| 3000 metres steeplechase | Edmund Serem; Kenya | 8:15.28 WU20L | Matthew Kosgei; Kenya | 8:17.46 PB | Hailu Ayalew; Ethiopia | 8:24.08 PB |
| 4 × 100 metres relay | Jamaica; Jace Witter; Gary Card; Nyrone Wade; Deandre Daley | 39.18 SB | Great Britain; Jake Odey-Jordan; Joel Masters; Dean Patterson; Teddy Wilson; Fabian Powell* | 39.20 SB | Thailand; Wirayut Daenkhanob; Sarawut Nuansi; Chutithat Pruksorranan; Puripol Boonson | 39.39 NU20R |
| 4 × 400 metres relay | United States; Jayden Davis; Xavier Donaldson; Alexander Rhodes; Sidi Njie; Grant Buckmiller*; Gabriel Clement II* | 3:03.56 SB | South Africa; Bryan Katoo; Sihle Mahlangu; Njabulo Mbatha; Udeme Okon; Kryn Romijn* | 3:05.22 SB | Australia; Caleb Kilpatrick; Jett Grundy; Jack Deguara; Jordan Gilbert | 3:05.53 SB |
| 10,000 m walk | Rayen Cherni; Tunisia | 39:24.85 CR | Emiliano Barba; Mexico | 39:27.10 AU20R | Giuseppe Disabato; Italy | 39:31.25 NU20R |
| High jump | Scottie Vines; United States | 2.25 m PB | Matteo Sioli; Italy | 2.23 m PB | Kaisei Nakatani; Japan | 2.19 m |
| Pole vault | Hendrik Müller; Germany | 5.45 m | Rikuya Yoshida; Japan | 5.40 m PB | Jan Krček; Czech Republic | 5.30 m PB |
| Long jump | Roko Farkaš; Croatia | 8.17 m | Luka Bošković; Serbia | 7.93 m | Mason McGroder; Australia | 7.80 m PB |
| Triple jump | Ethan Olivier; New Zealand | 17.01 m =AU20R | Karson Gordon; United States | 16.74 m PB | Yinglong Ma; China | 16.30 m PB |
| Shot put | Jarno van Daalen; Netherlands | 20.76 m PB | JL van Rensburg; South Africa | 20.74 m PB | Georg Harpf; Germany | 20.28 m |
| Discus throw | Bryce Ruland; United States | 62.59 m PB | Jarno van Daalen; Netherlands | 62.22 m PB | Mico Lampinen; Finland | 62.20 m PB |
| Hammer throw | Iosif Kesidis; Cyprus | 82.80 m WU20L | Roland Imre; Hungary | 75.33 m PB | Ármin Szabados; Hungary | 74.88 m |
| Javelin throw | Tom Teršek; Slovenia | 76.81 m PB | Xiaobo Wang; China | 75.50 m PB | Oisín Joyce; Ireland | 73.89 m NU20R |
| Decathlon | Tomas Järvinen; Czech Republic | 8425 pts CR | Hubert Trościanka; Poland | 8230 pts NU20R | Florian Vriezen; Netherlands | 7820 pts PB |

== Women's results ==
| Event | Gold | | Silver | | Bronze | |
|---|---|---|---|---|---|---|
| 100 metres (Wind: +0.0 m/s) | Alana Reid; Jamaica | 11.17 | Adaejah Hodge; British Virgin Islands | 11.27 | Kishawna Niles; Barbados | 11.37 |
| 200 metres (Wind: -0.7 m/s) | Adaejah Hodge; British Virgin Islands | 22.74 | Torrie Lewis; Australia | 22.88 PB | Shanoya Douglas; Jamaica | 23.10 |
| 400 metres | Lurdes Gloria Manuel; Czech Republic | 51.29 | Dianna Proctor; Canada | 51.98 PB | Zaya Akins; United States | 52.00 |
| 800 metres | Sarah Moraa; Kenya | 2:00.36 | Claudia Hollingsworth; Australia | 2:00.87 | Sophia Gorriaran; United States | 2:01.04 |
| 1500 metres | Saron Berhe; Ethiopia | 4:16.64 | Rachel Forsyth; Canada | 4:17.94 | Jolanda Kallabis; Germany | 4:19.34 |
| 3000 metres | Aleshign Baweke; Ethiopia | 8:50.32 | Marion Jepngetich; Kenya | 8:52.37 | Marta Alemayo; Ethiopia | 8:53.64 |
| 5000 metres | Mekedes Alemeshete; Ethiopia | 14:57.44 CR | Charity Cherop; Uganda | 15:25.02 PB | Mercy Chepkemoi; Kenya | 15:33.29 |
| 100 metres hurdles (Wind: -0.3 m/s) | Kerrica Hill; Jamaica | 12.99 | Mia Wild; Croatia | 13.15 | Delta Amidzovski; Australia | 13.24 |
| 400 metres hurdles | Méta Tumba; France | 55.59 NU20R | Wiktoria Gadajska; Poland | 56.87 NU20R | Hannah van Niekerk; South Africa | 56.98 PB |
| 3000 metres steeplechase | Sembo Almayew; Ethiopia | 9:12.71 CR | Loice Chekwemoi; Uganda | 9:18.84 PB | Diana Chepkemoi; Kenya | 9:29.84 PB |
| 4 × 100 metres relay | Jamaica; Shanoya Douglas; Alliah Baker; Briana Campbell; Alana Reid; Sabrina Dockery* | 43.39 SB | Switzerland; Timea Rankl; Lia Thalmann; Chloé Rabac; Alicia Masini | 44.06 NU20R | Canada; Savannah Blair; Dianna Proctor; Ashley Odiase; Renée Roxane Tedga; Kiara Webb* | 44.60 SB |
| 4 × 400 metres relay | United States; Michaela Mouton; Olivia Harris; Josie Donelson; Zaya Akins; Lakely Doht-Barron*; Isabella Kneeshaw* | 3:30.74 SB | Australia; Amelia Rowe; Bella Pasquali; Jemma Pollard; Sophia Gregorevic; Charlotte McAuliffe* | 3:31.47 SB | Great Britain; Charlotte Henrich; Emma Holmes; Kara DaCosta; Rebecca Grieve; Jessica Astill*; Nandy Kihuyu* | 3:32.80 SB |
| 10,000 m walk | Baima Zhuoma; China | 43:26.60 WU20L | Chen Meiling; China | 44:30.67 PB | Aarti Bhadana; India (IND) | 44:39.39 |
| High jump | Angelina Topić; Serbia | 1.91 m | Izobelle Louison-Roe; Australia | 1.89 m PB | Karmen Bruus; Estonia | 1.89 m SB |
| Pole vault | Molly Haywood; United States | 4.47 m PB | Magdalena Rauter; Austria | 4.15 m | Tryphena Hewett; Australia | 4.15 m |
| Long jump | Delta Amidzovski; Australia | 6.58 m PB | Sophia Beckmon; United States | 6.54 m | Julia Adamczyk; Poland | 6.34 m |
| Triple jump | Sharifa Davronova; Uzbekistan | 13.75 m | Yi Li; China | 13.55 m | Erika Saraceni; Italy | 13.46 m PB |
| Shot put | Akaoma Odeluga; United States | 17.34 m | Martina Mazurová; Czech Republic | 16.38 m PB | Ching-Yuan Chiang; Chinese Taipei | 16.01 m NU20R |
| Discus throw | Bingyang Han; China | 57.57 m PB | Jingru Huang; China | 56.47 m | Marley Raikiwasa; Australia | 56.25 m |
| Hammer throw | Jiale Zhange; China | 68.95 m | Valentina Savva; Cyprus | 67.21 m | Villő Viszkeleti; Hungary | 64.94 m |
| Javelin throw | Yan Ziyi; China | 63.05 m | Pin-Hsun Chu; Chinese Taipei | 54.28 m | Evelyn Bliss; United States | 54.01 m |
| Heptathlon | Jana Koščak; Croatia | 5807 pts | Lucia Acklin; Switzerland | 5755 pts PB | Adéla Tkáčová; Czech Republic | 5601 pts |

== Mixed results ==
| Event | Gold | | Silver | | Bronze | |
|---|---|---|---|---|---|---|
| Mixed 4 × 400 metres relay | Australia; Jordan Gilbert; Bella Pasquali; Jack Deguara; Sophia Gregorevic | 3:19.27 AU20R | Poland; Jakub Szarapo; Wiktoria Gajosz; Stanisław Strzelecki; Zofia Tomczyk; Michał Kijewski* | 3:20.44 SB | China; Haoran Fu; Yalun Wang; Ailixier Wumaier; Yinglan Liu; Xinfeng Xu* | 3:21.27 PB |

* – Indicates the athlete competed in preliminary heats but not the final.

== Medal table ==
* Host nation (Peru)

| Rank | Nation | Gold | Silver | Bronze | Total |
|---|---|---|---|---|---|
| 1 | United States | 8 | 4 | 4 | 16 |
| 2 | Ethiopia | 6 | 2 | 2 | 10 |
| 3 | China | 4 | 4 | 3 | 11 |
| 4 | Jamaica | 4 | 0 | 1 | 5 |
| 5 | Kenya | 3 | 3 | 1 | 7 |
| 6 | South Africa | 3 | 2 | 2 | 7 |
| 7 | Australia | 2 | 7 | 5 | 14 |
| 8 | Czech Republic | 2 | 2 | 2 | 6 |
| 9 | Croatia | 2 | 1 | 0 | 3 |
| 10 | Netherlands | 1 | 1 | 1 | 3 |
| 11 | British Virgin Islands | 1 | 1 | 0 | 2 |
| 11 | Cyprus | 1 | 1 | 0 | 2 |
| 11 | Serbia | 1 | 1 | 0 | 2 |
| 14 | Germany | 1 | 0 | 2 | 3 |
| 15 | France | 1 | 0 | 0 | 1 |
| 15 | New Zealand | 1 | 0 | 0 | 1 |
| 15 | Norway | 1 | 0 | 0 | 1 |
| 15 | Slovenia | 1 | 0 | 0 | 1 |
| 15 | Tunisia | 1 | 0 | 0 | 1 |
| 15 | Uzbekistan | 1 | 0 | 0 | 1 |
| 21 | Poland | 0 | 3 | 1 | 4 |
| 22 | Canada | 0 | 2 | 1 | 3 |
| 23 | Switzerland | 0 | 2 | 0 | 2 |
| 24 | Great Britain | 0 | 1 | 3 | 4 |
| 25 | Hungary | 0 | 1 | 2 | 3 |
| 25 | Italy | 0 | 1 | 2 | 3 |
| 25 | Japan | 0 | 1 | 2 | 3 |
| 25 | Uganda | 0 | 1 | 2 | 3 |
| 29 | Chinese Taipei | 0 | 1 | 1 | 2 |
| 29 | Thailand | 0 | 1 | 1 | 2 |
| 31 | Austria | 0 | 1 | 0 | 1 |
| 31 | Mexico | 0 | 1 | 0 | 1 |
| 33 | Finland | 0 | 0 | 2 | 2 |
| 34 | Barbados | 0 | 0 | 1 | 1 |
| 34 | Estonia | 0 | 0 | 1 | 1 |
| 34 | India | 0 | 0 | 1 | 1 |
| 34 | Ireland | 0 | 0 | 1 | 1 |
| 34 | Spain | 0 | 0 | 1 | 1 |
| Totals (38 entries) | | 45 | 45 | 45 | 135 |

Source: World Athletics U20 Championships Lima 24 Medal Table

== Placing table ==
| Rank | Country | 1st place, gold medalist(s) | 2nd place, silver medalist(s) | 3rd place, bronze medalist(s) | 4 | 5 | 6 | 7 | 8 | Points |
|---|---|---|---|---|---|---|---|---|---|---|
| 1 | United States | 8 | 4 | 4 | 3 | 6 | 2 | 3 | 3 | 170 |
| 2 | Australia | 2 | 7 | 5 | 3 | 4 | 2 | 4 | 1 | 141 |
| 3 | China | 4 | 4 | 3 | 3 | 0 | 4 | 2 | 2 | 111 |
| 4 | Ethiopia | 6 | 2 | 2 | 3 | 0 | 1 | 0 | 2 | 94 |
| 5 | Kenya | 3 | 3 | 1 | 3 | 2 | 0 | 2 | 0 | 78 |
| 6 | South Africa | 3 | 2 | 2 | 2 | 2 | 0 | 1 | 0 | 70 |
| 7 | Germany | 1 | 0 | 2 | 3 | 3 | 4 | 2 | 3 | 66 |
| 8 | Jamaica | 4 | 0 | 1 | 2 | 0 | 2 | 2 | 1 | 59 |
| 9 | Great Britain | 0 | 1 | 3 | 2 | 3 | 1 | 2 | 1 | 55 |
| 10 | Japan | 0 | 1 | 2 | 1 | 5 | 2 | 1 | 2 | 54 |
| 11 | Poland | 0 | 3 | 1 | 3 | 1 | 1 | 2 | 0 | 53 |
| 12 | Czech Republic | 2 | 2 | 2 | 0 | 1 | 0 | 1 | 1 | 49 |
| 13 | France | 1 | 0 | 0 | 1 | 3 | 2 | 1 | 5 | 38 |
| 13 | Uganda | 0 | 1 | 2 | 0 | 3 | 1 | 2 | 0 | 38 |
| 15 | Italy | 0 | 1 | 2 | 0 | 2 | 1 | 1 | 1 | 33 |
| 16 | Canada | 0 | 2 | 1 | 2 | 0 | 0 | 1 | 0 | 32 |
| 17 | Hungary | 0 | 1 | 2 | 2 | 0 | 0 | 1 | 0 | 31 |
| 18 | Ukraine | 0 | 0 | 0 | 3 | 1 | 3 | 0 | 1 | 29 |
| 19 | Croatia | 2 | 1 | 0 | 1 | 0 | 0 | 0 | 0 | 28 |
| 20 | Netherlands | 1 | 1 | 1 | 0 | 1 | 0 | 0 | 0 | 25 |
| 21 | Norway | 1 | 0 | 0 | 1 | 0 | 3 | 0 | 2 | 24 |
| 22 | Switzerland | 0 | 2 | 0 | 1 | 0 | 0 | 1 | 0 | 21 |
| 22 | Finland | 0 | 0 | 2 | 0 | 1 | 1 | 1 | 0 | 21 |
| 24 | Cyprus | 1 | 1 | 0 | 0 | 0 | 1 | 0 | 0 | 18 |
| 25 | Chinese Taipei | 0 | 1 | 1 | 0 | 0 | 1 | 0 | 0 | 16 |
| 25 | India | 0 | 0 | 1 | 0 | 1 | 2 | 0 | 0 | 16 |
| 27 | British Virgin Islands | 1 | 1 | 0 | 0 | 0 | 0 | 0 | 0 | 15 |
| 27 | Serbia | 1 | 1 | 0 | 0 | 0 | 0 | 0 | 0 | 15 |
| 29 | Spain | 0 | 0 | 1 | 0 | 0 | 2 | 1 | 0 | 14 |
| 29 | Sweden | 0 | 0 | 0 | 1 | 0 | 2 | 1 | 1 | 14 |
| 31 | Thailand | 0 | 1 | 1 | 0 | 0 | 0 | 0 | 0 | 13 |
| 32 | Uzbekistan | 1 | 0 | 0 | 0 | 0 | 1 | 0 | 0 | 11 |
| 32 | Ireland | 0 | 0 | 1 | 0 | 0 | 1 | 1 | 0 | 11 |
| 32 | Qatar | 0 | 0 | 0 | 1 | 0 | 2 | 0 | 0 | 11 |
| 35 | Mexico | 0 | 1 | 0 | 0 | 0 | 1 | 0 | 0 | 10 |
| 35 | Nigeria | 0 | 0 | 0 | 0 | 2 | 0 | 1 | 0 | 10 |
| 37 | Slovenia | 1 | 0 | 0 | 0 | 0 | 0 | 0 | 1 | 9 |
| 38 | New Zealand | 1 | 0 | 0 | 0 | 0 | 0 | 0 | 0 | 8 |
| 38 | Tunisia | 1 | 0 | 0 | 0 | 0 | 0 | 0 | 0 | 8 |
| 38 | Cuba | 0 | 0 | 0 | 0 | 1 | 1 | 0 | 1 | 8 |
| 41 | Austria | 0 | 1 | 0 | 0 | 0 | 0 | 0 | 0 | 7 |
| 41 | Estonia | 0 | 0 | 1 | 0 | 0 | 0 | 0 | 1 | 7 |
| 41 | Romania | 0 | 0 | 0 | 1 | 0 | 0 | 1 | 0 | 7 |
| 44 | Barbados | 0 | 0 | 1 | 0 | 0 | 0 | 0 | 0 | 6 |
| 44 | Colombia | 0 | 0 | 0 | 0 | 1 | 0 | 1 | 0 | 6 |
| 44 | Belgium | 0 | 0 | 0 | 0 | 0 | 0 | 3 | 0 | 6 |
| 47 | Bulgaria | 0 | 0 | 0 | 1 | 0 | 0 | 0 | 0 | 5 |
| 47 | Maldives | 0 | 0 | 0 | 1 | 0 | 0 | 0 | 0 | 5 |
| 47 | United States Virgin Islands | 0 | 0 | 0 | 1 | 0 | 0 | 0 | 0 | 5 |
| 50 | Denmark | 0 | 0 | 0 | 0 | 1 | 0 | 0 | 0 | 4 |
| 50 | Greece | 0 | 0 | 0 | 0 | 1 | 0 | 0 | 0 | 4 |
| 50 | Puerto Rico | 0 | 0 | 0 | 0 | 1 | 0 | 0 | 0 | 4 |
| 53 | Brazil | 0 | 0 | 0 | 0 | 0 | 1 | 0 | 0 | 3 |
| 53 | South Korea | 0 | 0 | 0 | 0 | 0 | 1 | 0 | 0 | 3 |
| 53 | Hong Kong | 0 | 0 | 0 | 0 | 0 | 0 | 1 | 1 | 3 |
| 53 | Morocco | 0 | 0 | 0 | 0 | 0 | 0 | 1 | 1 | 3 |
| 53 | Trinidad and Tobago | 0 | 0 | 0 | 0 | 0 | 0 | 1 | 1 | 3 |
| 58 | Burundi | 0 | 0 | 0 | 0 | 0 | 0 | 1 | 0 | 2 |
| 58 | Slovakia | 0 | 0 | 0 | 0 | 0 | 0 | 1 | 0 | 2 |
| 58 | Turkey | 0 | 0 | 0 | 0 | 0 | 0 | 1 | 0 | 2 |
| 61 | Bahamas | 0 | 0 | 0 | 0 | 0 | 0 | 0 | 1 | 1 |
| 61 | Kuwait | 0 | 0 | 0 | 0 | 0 | 0 | 0 | 1 | 1 |
| 61 | Latvia | 0 | 0 | 0 | 0 | 0 | 0 | 0 | 1 | 1 |
| 61 | Portugal | 0 | 0 | 0 | 0 | 0 | 0 | 0 | 1 | 1 |
| 61 | Tanzania | 0 | 0 | 0 | 0 | 0 | 0 | 0 | 1 | 1 |
| 61 | Venezuela | 0 | 0 | 0 | 0 | 0 | 0 | 0 | 1 | 1 |

== Participation ==
The following is a list of participating nations with the number of qualified athletes in brackets. A country without any qualified athlete could enter either one male or one female. A total 134 National Associations (plus the teams from Authorized Neutral Athletes and Athlete Refugee Team) and 1720 athletes are scheduled to compete.

- Algeria (16)
- Andorra (1)
- Angola (1)
- Argentina (12)
- ART (3)
- Aruba (1)
- Australia (68)
- Austria (8)
- Bahamas (13)
- Barbados (4)
- Belgium (14)
- Bermuda (1)
- Bolivia (1)
- Bosnia and Herzegovina (2)
- Botswana (12)
- Brazil (34)
- British Virgin Islands (1)
- Bulgaria (11)
- Burkina Faso (1)
- Burundi (3)
- Canada (32)
- Cayman Islands (1)
- Chile (14)
- China (35)
- Chinese Taipei (5)
- Colombia (21)
- Cook Islands (1)
- Costa Rica (1)
- Croatia (13)
- Cuba (10)
- Cyprus (8)
- Czech Republic (35)
- Denmark (15)
- Dominica (1)
- Dominican Republic (2)
- Ecuador (18)
- Egypt (2)
- El Salvador (1)
- Estonia (19)
- Ethiopia (21)
- Finland (20)
- France (42)
- Germany (92)
- Great Britain (39)
- Greece (19)
- Grenada (9)
- Guatemala (4)
- Guyana (10)
- Haiti (2)
- Honduras (1)
- Hong Kong (8)
- Hungary (20)
- Iceland (2)
- India (43)
- Iraq (2)
- Ireland (16)
- Israel (7)
- Italy (61)
- Ivory Coast (1)
- Jamaica (48)
- Japan (40)
- Kazakhstan (5)
- Kenya (20)
- Kuwait (3)
- Latvia (18)
- Lebanon (1)
- Lesotho (1)
- Liberia (1)
- Liechtenstein (1)
- Lithuania (9)
- Luxembourg (2)
- Macau (1)
- Malaysia (7)
- Maldives (1)
- Malta (1)
- Mauritius (2)
- Mexico (17)
- Moldova (1)
- Monaco (1)
- Montenegro (1)
- Montserrat (1)
- Morocco (13)
- Mozambique (3)
- Namibia (1)
- Netherlands (13)
- New Zealand (16)
- Nicaragua (1)
- Niger (1)
- Nigeria (20)
- North Macedonia (1)
- Northern Mariana Islands (1)
- Norway (21)
- Oman (1)
- Palestine (1)
- Paraguay (1)
- Peru (30) (hosts)
- Poland (37)
- Portugal (13)
- Puerto Rico (10)
- Qatar (11)
- Republic of the Congo (3)
- Romania (19)
- Rwanda (1)
- Saint Kitts and Nevis (2)
- Saint Lucia (1)
- Saint Vincent and the Grenadines (3)
- Saudi Arabia (9)
- Senegal (1)
- Serbia (17)
- Seychelles (1)
- Singapore (2)
- Slovakia (9)
- Slovenia (18)
- South Africa (44)
- South Korea (14)
- Spain (52)
- Sri Lanka (12)
- Sweden (20)
- Switzerland (42)
- Tanzania (1)
- Thailand (9)
- Trinidad and Tobago (17)
- Tunisia (10)
- Turkey (5)
- Turks and Caicos Islands (1)
- Uganda (11)
- Ukraine (19)
- United States (100)
- United States Virgin Islands (3)
- Uruguay (2)
- Uzbekistan (6)
- Venezuela (6)
- Vietnam (1)
- Zimbabwe (8)
