= Jemma Pollard =

Australian athlete (born 2005)

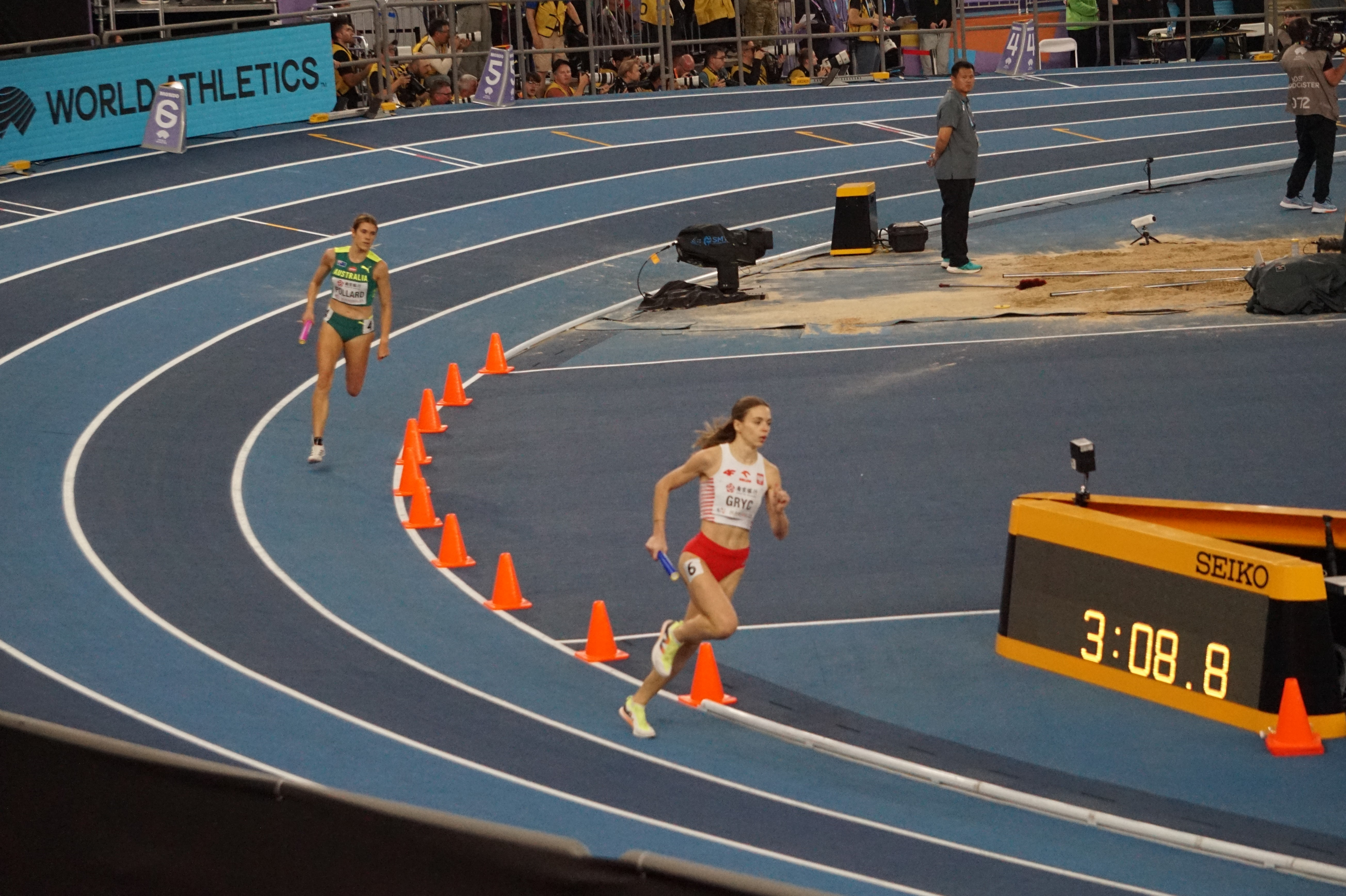
- Pollard at the 2025 World Indoor Championships

Personal information
- Born: 18 April 2005 (age 21)

Sport
- Sport: Athletics
- Event: Sprint

Achievements and titles
- Personal bests: 400m: 51.73s (Perth, 2026)
Medal record
Women's athletics
Representing Australia
World Indoor Championships
Bronze medal – third place	2025 Nanjing	4x400 m relay
World U20 Championships
Silver medal – second place	2024 Lima	4x400 m relay

Jemma Pollard (born 18 April 2005) is an Australian sprinter who specialises in the 400 metres. She won a bronze medal in the 4 × 400 metres relay at the 2025 World Athletics Indoor Championships and a silver medal in the 4 × 400 metres relay at the 2024 World U20 Championships.

== Biography ==
Pollard is a member of Newcastle Runners. She was a gold medalist in the 400 metres and 4 x 400 metres relay at the 2022 Oceania U18 Athletics Championships in Mackay in June 2022.

Pollard finished third at Stawell Gift in April 2024. She won silver in the women's 4 × 400 m relay at the 2024 World Athletics U20 Championships in Lima, Peru.

Pollard won bronze at the 2025 World Athletics Indoor Championships in Nanjing, China in the Women's 4 × 400 metres relay alongside Ellie Beer, Ella Connolly and Bella Pasquali. Pollard competed at the 2025 World Athletics Relays in China in the Women's 4 × 400 metres relay in May 2025, helping the Australian team qualify for the 2025 World Championships. Pollard was subsequently selected for the Australian team for the 2025 World Athletics Championships in Tokyo, Japan, where she again ran in the women's x 400 metres relay.

In Canberra in January 2026, she ran a personal best 52.18 seconds for the 400 metres to win the Capital Athletics Open and Under 20 Championships. Pollard ran a personal best to win the 400 metres at the Perth Track Classic on 14 February 2026, winning with a time of 51.73 seconds, before also winning the following month over 400 m at the Adelaide Invitational. The following month, Pollard won the 400m title in 52.79 at the NSW State Championships. Pollard represented Australia in the mixed 4 × 400 m relay at the 2026 Commonwealth Games.

== Personal life ==
She is from Newcastle, New South Wales.
