= 2024 World Athletics U20 Championships – Men's high jump =

Men's high jump at the 2024 World Athletics U20 Championships
- Venue: Estadio Atlético de la VIDENA
- Dates: 28 August 2024 (qualification); 30 August 2024 (final)
- Competitors: 17 from 14 nations
- Winning height: 2.25 m

Medalists
gold medal	Scottie Vines	United States
silver medal	Matteo Sioli	Italy
bronze medal	Kaisei Nakatani	Japan

The men's high jump at the 2024 World Athletics U20 Championships was held at the Estadio Atlético de la VIDENA in Lima, Peru on 28 and 30 August 2024.

== Records ==
U20 standing records prior to the 2024 World Athletics U20 Championships were as follows:

Record	Athlete & Nationality	Mark	Location	Date
World U20 Record	Dragutin Topić (YUG)	2.37	Plovdiv, Bulgaria	12 August 1990
World U20 Record	Steve Smith (GBR)	2.37	Seoul, South Korea	20 September 1992
Championship Record	Dragutin Topić (YUG)	2.37	Plovdiv, Bulgaria	12 August 1990
Championship Record	Steve Smith (GBR)	2.37	Seoul, South Korea	20 September 1992
World U20 Leading	Stepan Vetkin (RUS)	2.27	Bryansk, Russia	20 July 2024

== Results ==
=== Qualification ===
Athletes attaining a mark of at least 2.17 metres (Q) or at least the 12 best performers (q) qualified for the final.

==== Group A ====
Rank	Athlete	Nation	2.00	2.05	2.09	2.12	Mark	Notes
1	Yasir Kuduban	Turkey	o	o	o	o	2.12	q
1	Matteo Sioli	Italy	o	o	o	o	2.12	q
3	Scottie Vines	United States	–	o	xo	o	2.12	q
4	Kaisei Nakatani	Japan	–	xxo	xxo	o	2.12	q
5	Dong Ziang	China	–	o	–	xo	2.12	q
6	Antrea Mita	Greece	o	xo	o	xo	2.12	q
7	Tshepang Dankuru	South Africa	–	o	o	xxo	2.12	q
8	Raul Matilla	Spain	o	o	xo	xx–	2.09	q
–	Ridzerd Punt	Netherlands	xxx				NM	

==== Group B ====
Rank	Athlete	Nation	2.00	2.05	2.09	2.12	Mark	Notes
1	Tito Alofe	United States	o	o	o	o	2.12	q
1	Luke Van Der Merwe	South Africa	o	o	o	xxx	2.09	q
3	Georgios Manolopoulos	Greece	o	xo	xxo	xxx	2.09	q
4	Mitchell Hatfield	Australia	o	o	xxo	xxx	2.09	q
5	Abderrahmane Djaber	Algeria	xo	o	xo	xxx	2.09	
6	Tharusha Agampodi	Sri Lanka	o	xo	xxx		2.05	
7	Lesandru Gammanage	Sri Lanka	xo	xo	xxx		2.05	
8	Cristóbal Sahurie	Chile	xxo	xxx			2.00	

=== Final ===
Rank	Athlete	Nation	2.04	2.08	2.12	2.15	2.17	2.19	2.21	2.23	2.25	2.28	Mark	Notes
1st place, gold medalist(s)	Scottie Vines	United States	–	o	o	o	xo	o	o	xxo	o	xxx	2.25	PB
2nd place, silver medalist(s)	Matteo Sioli	Italy	o	o	o	o	o	o	xxo	xxo	xxx		2.23	PB
3rd place, bronze medalist(s)	Kaisei Nakatani	Japan	o	o	xo	xo	xxo	o	xxx				2.19	
4	Dong Ziang	China	o	o	–	xxo	xo	xxx					2.17	
5	Mitchell Hatfield	Australia	o	xo	xo	xxx							2.12	
5	Antrea Mita	Greece	o	xo	xo	xxx							2.12	
7	Tito Alofe	United States	o	xo	xxx								2.08	
7	Tshepang Dankuru	South Africa	–	xo	xxx								2.08	
7	Yasir Kuduban	Turkey	o	xo	xxx								2.08	
10	Raul Matilla	Spain	o	xxo	xxx								2.08	
11	Georgios Manolopoulos	Greece	o	xxx									2.04	
11	Luke Van Der Merwe	South Africa	o	xxx									2.04	
