= Oisín Joyce =

Irish athlete (born 2005)

Oisin Joyce
Personal information
- Nationality: Irish
- Born: 29 January 2005 (age 21)

Sport
- Sport: Athletics
- Event: Javelin throw
Medal record
Men's athletics
Representing Ireland
World U20 Championships
Bronze medal – third place	2024 Lima	Javelin throw
European Throwing Cup
Bronze medal – third place	2025 Nicosia	U23 Javelin throw

Oisín Joyce (born 29 January 2005) is an Irish javelin thrower. He won the bronze medal at the 2024 World Athletics U20 Championships.

== Career ==
In July 2023, he won the Irish Athletics Championships javelin throw in Dublin at 70.56 metres.

In June 2024, he set a new Irish U20 record of 73.42 metres for the javelin throw at the Bauhaus Jürgen Gala in Germany. That month, he retained his title at the Irish Athletics Championships in Dublin.

Competing at the 2024 World Athletics U20 Championships in the men's javelin throw, he won bronze in Lima, Peru. In doing so, he set a new Irish U-20 record of 73.89 metres. He became the first Irish javelin thrower, and only the fifth Irish athlete, to win a medal, and the first Irish person to win a throws event, at the World U20 Athletics Championship. He was honoured with the Young Person Award at the Mayo People of the Year Awards.

He won the bronze medal in the Under 23 javelin at the 2025 European Throwing Cup in Nicosia in March 2025.

== Personal life ==
He is from Ballinrobe in County Mayo and is a member of Lake District AC, a club his mother, Joyce, had helped start. He played Gaelic Football before giving it up to focus on athletics. He was coached from the age of nine by his father, Pádraic, even though he had no throwing background himself, and they also sought outside help, such as Andreas Thorkildsen, Irish record holder Terry McHugh, and British coach David Parker. In 2023, he received the Martin Sheridan Bursary to help with the costs of competing and with which he obtained a new javelin.
