= Amelia Rowe =

Australian athlete (born 2006)

Personal information
- Born: 8 November 2006 (age 19)

Sport
- Sport: Athletics
- Event: Sprint

Achievements and titles
- Personal best(s): 400m: 52.49s (Perth, 2025)
Medal record
Women's athletics
Representing Australia
Oceania Championships
Bronze medal – third place	2024 Suva	400 m
World U20 Championships
Silver medal – second place	2024 Lima	4x400 m relay

Amelia Rowe (born 8 November 2006) is an Australian sprinter. She was the bronze medalist at the 2024 Oceania Athletics Championships over 400 metres.

== Early life ==
She is from Perth, Australia. She became the Australian All Schools U18 champion over 200 metres.

== Career ==
Rowe won the 400 metres at the Australian All Schools Championships in Perth in December 2023.

In 2024, she win gold in the U20 400m final at the Australian Athletics Championships in Adelaide. She was subsequently selected for the 2024 Oceania Athletics Championships in Suva, Fiji, where she won the bronze medal in the individual 400 metres.

She won a silver medal with the Australian women's 4x400 metres relay team at the 2024 World Athletics U20 Championships in Lima, Peru.

She lowered her personal best to 52.83 seconds for the 400 metres at the Melbourne Invitational on 29 March 2025. She finished third at the Australian Athletics Championships over 400 metres in a personal best time of 52.49 seconds on 12 April 2025. She competed at the 2025 World Athletics Relays in China in the Women's 4 × 400 metres relay in May 2025.

She was selected for the Australian team for the 2025 World Athletics Championships in Tokyo, Japan.
