= Helena Kopp =

German shot putter

Personal information
- Nationality: German
- Born: 22 June 2004 (age 22)

Sport
- Sport: Athletics
- Event: Shot put

Achievements and titles
- Personal best(s): Shot put: 16.90 m (Bergen, 2025)
Medal record
Women's athletics
Representing Germany
European U23 Championships
Bronze medal – third place	2025 Bergen	Shot put
European Throwing Cup
Gold medal – first place	2026 Nicosia	U23 Shot put

Helena Kopp (born 22 June 2004) is a German shot putter. She won the gold medal in the under-23 competition at the 2026 European Throwing Cup, and won the bronze medal at the 2025 European U23 Championships.

== Career ==
From Wiehl, in the Oberbergischer Kreis, Kopp initially competed as a multi-event athlete. Formerly a member of TSV Bayer 04 Leverkusen, Kopp finished sixth in the shot put at the U16 German Championships in Bremen in 2019. Kopp later became a member of LG Stadtwerke München in Bavaria.

Kopp won a bronze medal at the 2025 European Athletics U23 Championships in the shot put, as part of a German 1-2-3 in the event, landing a personal best throw of 16.90m to finish behind Nina Chioma Ndubuisi and Jolina Lange.

In February 2026, Kopp placed fourth at the senior German Indoor Championships with a throw of 16.69 metres. Kopp won the U23 shot put title with 16.29 metres at the 2026 European Throwing Cup in Nicosia, Cyprus, on 15 March 2026.
