= Wiktoria Gajosz =

Polish athlete (born 2006)

Personal information
- Born: 6 July 2006 (age 20) Chełm, Poland
- Height: 1.79 m (5 ft 10 in)
- Weight: 63 kg (139 lb)

Sport
- Sport: Athletics
- Event: Sprint

Achievements and titles
- Personal bests: 100 m: 11.47 (2025); 200 m: 23.07 (2025); 400 m: 52.98 (2024)
Medal record
Women's athletics
Representing Poland
European Championships
Bronze medal – third place	2026 Birmingham	4 × 100 m relay
World U20 Championships
Silver medal – second place	2024 Lima	4 × 400 m mixed
European U20 Championships
Bronze medal – third place	2025 Tampere	4 × 100 m relay

Wiktoria Gajosz (born 6 July 2006) is a Polish sprinter.

== Biography ==
In July 2024, she set a Polish national U20 record, and an U20 world leading time, of 36.82 seconds for the 300 metres, in Warsaw. That month, she won the Polish U20 400 metres title in Radom in 2024. In winning the individual race, she also ran a personal best of 52.98 seconds. At the championships, she was also part of the team that set a new Polish club U20 record in the women's 4 × 100 m relay and won the 4 × 400 metres relay.

She was a silver medalist at the 2024 World Athletics U20 Championships in the Mixed 4 × 400 metres relay in August 2024. At the Games, she also placed fourth in the final of the women's 4 × 400 metres relay.

In July 2025, she won the Polish under-20 title over 200 metres and also finished runner-up in the 100 metres. She was a bronze medalist with the Polish women 4 × 100 metres relay team at the 2025 European Athletics U20 Championships in Tampere, Finland.

In August 2026, she ran in the preliminary round of the women's 4 × 100 metres relay at the 2026 European Athletics Championships in Birmingham, with the Poland team winning the bronze medal in the final. She also competed in the women's 200 metres at the championships.

== Personal life ==
A member of Tomasovia Tomaszów Lubelski, she attended IV Liceum Ogólnokształcące in Chełm.
