= Nina Ndubuisi =

German shot putter

Nina Chioma Ndubuisi
- Nina Ndubuisi (2022)

Personal information
- Nationality: German
- Born: 29 April 2004 (age 22)

Sport
- Sport: Athletics
- Event: Shot put

Achievements and titles
- Personal bests: Shot put: 18.91 m (Lexington, 2025)
Medal record
Women's athletics
Representing Germany
European U23 Championships
Gold medal – first place	2025 Bergen	Shot put
European Athletics U20 Championships
Gold medal – first place	2023 Jerusalem	Shot put
Bronze medal – third place	2021 Tallinn	Shot put

Nina Chioma Ndubuisi (born 29 April 2004) is a German shot putter. She was European under-20 champion in 2023 and European under-23 champion 2025.

== Biography ==
From Schorndorf, she is a member of SG Schorndorf. She won a bronze medal in the shot put at the 2021 European Athletics U20 Championships in Tallinn, with a throw of 15.71 metres, and finished the year as the world best for an under-18 athlete after throwing the U18 three-kilogram shot put 18.59 meters at the German Youth Championships in Rostock in August.

She won a gold medal at the 2023 European Athletics U20 Championships in Jerusalem, Israel, with a best shot put of 17.97 metres. The under-20 world leader, she was nominated for European Athletics Rising Star Award in 2023.

Competing for the University of Texas she improved her personal best in the shot put to 18.04 metres in February 2024 at the New Mexico Collegiate Classic. She placed fourth overall at the 2024 NCAA Indoor Championships.

She made a new personal best of 18.91m in winning the SEC Conference final in Lexington in May 2025. She threw 18.50 metres to place third at the 2025 NCAA Outdoor Championships in Eugene, Oregon in June 2025.

She won a gold medal at the 2025 European Athletics U23 Championships in the shot put, leading the German team to a 1-2-3 in the event with Jolina Lange and Helena Kopp, winning with a best throw on the day of 17.73m.

Competing at the 2026 European Championships in Birmingham, England, she qualified for the final of the shot put and placed eighth overall with a best effort in the final of 18.21 metres.
