= Huang Jingru =

Chinese athlete (born 2005)

Personal information
- Nationality: Chinese
- Born: 25 January 2005 (age 21)

Sport
- Sport: Athletics
- Event: Discus throw

Achievements and titles
- Personal best: Discus: 57.52m (2024)
Medal record
Women's athletics
Representing China
World U20 Championships
Silver medal – second place	2024 Lima	Discus
Asian U20 Championships
Gold medal – first place	2023 Yecheon	Discus

Huang Jingru (born 25 January 2005) is a Chinese discus thrower. She won the 2023 Asian U20 Championships and won silver at the 2024 World Athletics U20 Championships.

== Career ==
She won gold in the discus throw at the 2023 Asian U20 Athletics Championships in Yecheon, South Korea in June 2023.

She increased her personal best to 57.52m in June 2024. She won silver in the discus throw at the 2024 World Athletics U20 Championships in Lima, Peru on 28 August 2024. She had qualified first at the event, with a throw of 56.45 metres in the preliminary round.
