= Wiktoria Gadajska =

Polish athlete (born 2006)

Personal information
- Nationality: Polish
- Born: 8 January 2006 (age 20)

Sport
- Sport: Athletics
- Event: 400m hurdles

Achievements and titles
- Personal best(s): 400 mH: 56.87 (Lima, 2024) NU20R
Medal record
Women's athletics
Representing Poland
World U20 Championships
Silver medal – second place	2024 Lima	400 m hurdles

Wiktoria Gadajska (born 8 January 2006) is a Polish hurdler. She won the silver medal at the 2024 World Athletics U20 Championships in the 400 metres hurdles.

== Career ==
In 2022, at the U18 Polish Indoor Championships, Gadajska won the 60 metres hurdles with a time of 8.26 seconds to become the Polish U18 national record holder, improving the previous record held by Pia Skrzyszowska. In July 2023, she reached the 400 metres hurdles final at the European Youth Summer Olympic Festival in Maribor.

In May 2024 in Warsaw, Gadajska improved the Polish national U20 record for the 400 metres hurdles, running a time of 57.07 seconds.

She won silver in the 400m hurdles at the 2024 World Athletics U20 Championships in Lima, Peru in August 2024 with a Polish national under-20 record time of 56.87 seconds.

== Personal life ==
She is a member of RLTL GGG RADOM in Radom, Poland.
