= Grethen =

Grethen is a surname. Notable people with the surname include:

- Charles Grethen (born 1992), Luxembourgish middle-distance runner
- Fonsy Grethen (born 1960), Luxembourgish carom billiards player
- Henri Grethen (born 1950), Luxembourgish politician
