= Marta Mitjans =

Spanish middle-distance runner

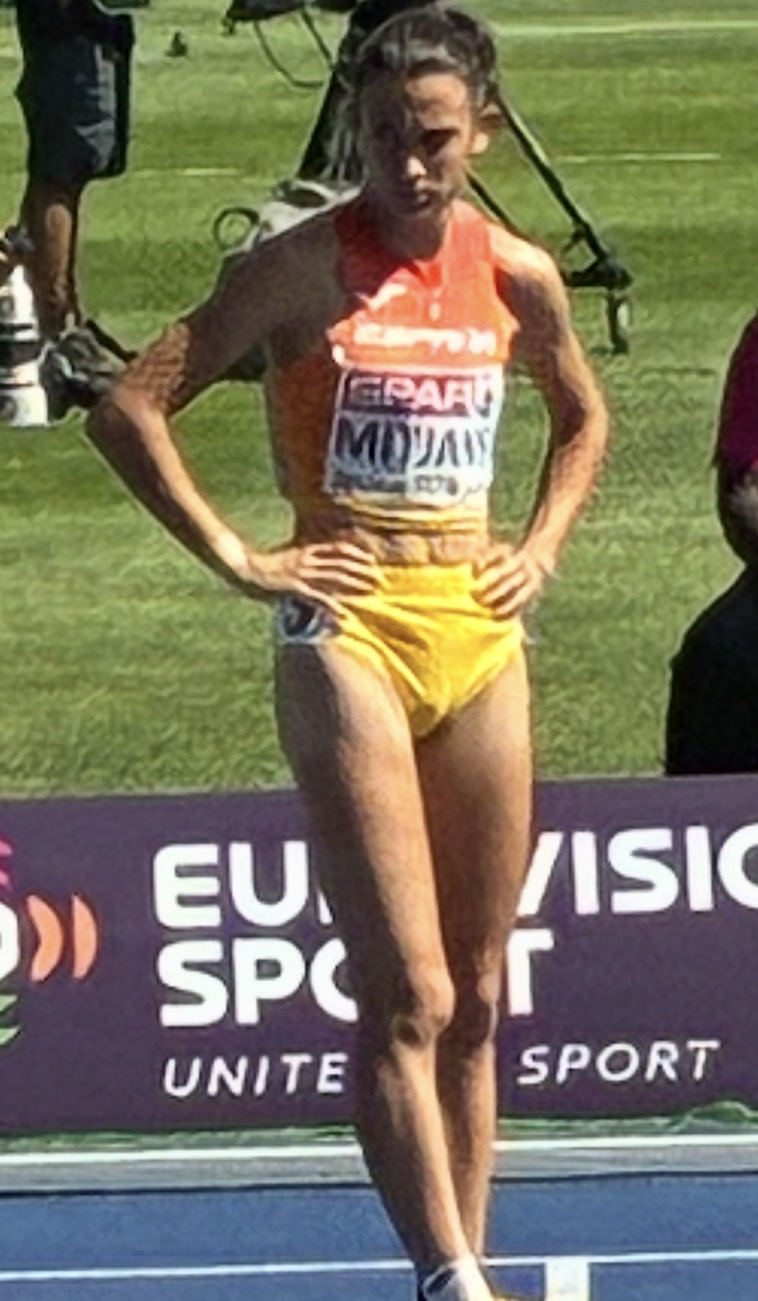
- Mitjans in 2026

Personal information
- Born: 28 December 2006 (age 19)

Sport
- Sport: Athletics
- Event: Middle-distance running

Achievements and titles
- Personal bests: 800m: 1:58.52 (Birmingham, 2026) NU20R; 1500m: 4:27.89 (Ciudad Real, 2025); Indoor; 800m: 2:01.86 (Valencia, 2026) NU20R; 1500m: 4:31.62 (Sabadell, 2025); Road; Mile: 4:44.05 (Pollença, 2025)
Medal record
Representing Spain
Women's athletics
European Youth Olympic Festival
Bronze medal – third place	2023 Maribor	800m
Ibero-American U18 Championships
Gold medal – first place	2023 Lima	800 m
Silver medal – second place	2023 Lima	Mixed relay
Bronze medal – third place	2023 Lima	4×100 m relay

Marta Mitjans (born 28 December 2006) is a Spanish middle-distance runner. She is the national under-20 record holder over 800 metres both outdoors and indoors.

== Biography ==
Mitjans started in athletics at the age of six years-old in Arenys de Mar, having favoured the training over swimming. She is a member of Nike Running, and is coached by Alfonso Guillén. She placed fifth over 800 metres at the senior Spanish Athletics Championships in 2024, running a personal best time of 2:03.92. She placed seventh overall in the 800 metres at the 2024 World Athletics U20 Championships in Lima, Peru, lowering her personal best to 2:03.20 in the semi-final. In October 2024, she won the Spanish national title in the mile run at the Spanish Road Running Championships in Albacete.

In February 2025, she set a new Spanish indoor under-20 national record whilst competing in Valencia, running 2:02.90. She subsequently competed for Spain at the 2025 European Athletics Indoor Championships in Apeldoorn, Netherlands.

In May 2025, she finished as runner-up to Marta Garcia in the mile run at the Spanish Road Running Championships in Pollença. In July 2025, she set a new Spanish under-20 national record and moved to sixth on the senior Spanish all-time list for the 800 metres, whilst competing in Madrid, running 1:59.88. She finished fourth over 800 metres at the 2025 European Athletics U20 Championships in Tampere, Finland.

In September 2025, she competed as an 18 year-old in the women's 800 metres at the 2025 World Athletics Championships in Tokyo, Japan. She was selected to compete in the mixed team relay at the 2025 European Cross Country Championships in Portugal, placing seventh overall.

Mitjans placed second to Rocío Arroyo in the 800 metres at the 2026 Spanish Indoor Championships in Valencia, running 2:01.86. On 7 June, she won in 2:00.63 over 800 metres at the 2026 Bauhausgalan in Stockholm. In August, she competed at the 2026 European Athletics Championships in Birmingham, England, in the women's 800 metres, reaching the semi-finals, having run a new personal best of 1:58.52.

== Personal life ==
She is from Maresme in the Barcelona region of Catalonia. She studied Sports Sciences at the University of Barcelona.

== International competitions ==
Representing Spain
Year	Competition	Venue	Position	Event	Time
2022	European U18 Championships	Jerusalem, Israel	7th	800 m	2:12.06
2023	European Youth Olympic Festival	Maribor, Slovenia	3rd	800 m	2:06.96
2023	European Youth Olympic Festival	Maribor, Slovenia	7th	Medley relay	2:10.74
2023	Ibero-American U18 Championships	Lima, Peru	1st	800 m	2:08.20
2023	Ibero-American U18 Championships	Lima, Peru	3rd	4 × 100 m relay	47.80
2023	Ibero-American U18 Championships	Lima, Peru	2nd	Mixed 4 × 400 m relay	3:32.56
2024	World U20 Championships	Lima, Peru	7th	800 m	2:04.15
2025	European Indoor Championships	Apeldoorn, Netherlands	5th (h)	800 m i	2:05.52
2025	European U20 Championships	Tampere, Finland	4th	800 m	2:01.90
2025	World Championships	Tokyo, Japan	30th (h)	800 m	2:00.67
2026	European Championships	Birmingham, United Kingdom	14th (sf)	800 m	1:59.91
