= Lucy Tallon =

British sprinter (born 2006)

Personal information
- Born: 2 March 2006 (age 20)

Sport
- Sport: Athletics
- Event: Sprint

Achievements and titles
- Personal best(s): 60m: 7.55 (London, 2025); 100m: 11.54 (London, 2025); 200m: 23.37 (Tampere, 2025)
Medal record
Women's athletics
Representing Great Britain
European U20 Championships
Silver medal – second place	2025 Tampere	200 m
Silver medal – second place	2025 Tampere	4x100 m relay

Lucy Tallon (born 2 March 2006) is a British sprinter. She was a silver medalist at the 2025 European Athletics U20 Championships in the 200 metres.

== Biography ==
Tallon is from Kent and is a member of Tonbridge Athletic Club in Kent. She set a personal best of 23.55 seconds for the 200 metres whilst running at the Bauhaus Junior Gal in Mannheim, Germany, in June 2025. She won the England Athletics U20 Championships title over 200 metres in Birmingham, the following month in July.

She was named in the British team for the 200 metres at the 2025 European Athletics U20 Championships in Tampere, Finland. At the championships, she ran the fastest time of all competitors in the heats with 23.65 seconds to qualify for the semi-finals (-1.2 m/s), before lowering her personal best to 23.37 to also win her semi-final (-0.4). In the final, she won the silver medal behind Judith Bilepo Mokobe of Germany with a time of 23.49 (-2.0), the same time as third-placed Czech Terezie Táborská. Later in the championship she joined fellow-sprint medalist Mabel Akande as well as Kaya Slater and Nell Desir to win the silver medal in the 4x100 metres relay in 43.98 seconds. In October 2025, she was named on the British Athletics Olympic Futures Programme for 2025/26. She was nominated for British under-20 female athlete of the year by Athletics Weekly in November 2025.

On 20 June 2026, she reached the semi-finals of the 100 metres at the 2026 British Championships.
