= 2023 Ibero-American U18 Championships in Athletics =

1st Ibero-American U18 Championships in Athletics
- Dates: 15–17 September 2023
- Host city: Lima, Peru
- Venue: VIDENA
- Level: U18
- Type: Outdoor
- Events: 43
- Participation: 12 nations

2023 Ibero-American U18 Championships in Athletics was the inaugural edition of the competition organised by Asociación Iberoamericana de Atletismo for athletes under the age of 18. It took place between 15 and 17 September at the VIDENA in Lima, Peru.

== Medal summary ==
=== Boys ===
Event	Gold		Silver		Bronze	
100 metres (wind: +0.1 m/s)	Deiner Guaitoto (COL)	10.80	Adrián Nicolari (URU)	10.87	Manuel Juárez (ARG)	10.88
200 metres (wind: 0.0 m/s)	Deiner Guaitoto (COL)	21.63	Rodrigo Fito (ESP)	21.68	Alejandro Cárdenas (MEX)	21.88
400 metres	Agustín Coronel (ARG)	47.41	Ian Andrey Pata (ECU)	47.87	Carlos Eduardo Lara (BRA)	48.44
800 metres	Vinícius Moraes (BRA)	1:54.53	Alejandro Ríos (ESP)	1:55.12	Carlos Eduardo Lara (BRA)	1:55.35
1500 metres	Alex Pintado (ESP)	4:05.45	Jessiel Páez (ECU)	4:06.71	Marcos Varela (ARG)	4:06.88
3000 metres	Jessiel Páez (ECU)	8:34.83	Dylan Carrasco (COL)	8:34.99	Josué Vega (ECU)	8:35.92
110 metres hurdles (91.4 cm)	Vinícius de Brito (BRA)	13.65	Mario Stefanov (ESP)	13.86	Ramón Fuenzalida (CHI)	13.97
400 metres hurdles (84.0 cm)	Ian Andrey Pata (ECU)	51.73	Vinícius de Brito (BRA)	51.87	Ramón Fuenzalida (CHI)	52.14
2000 metres steeplechase (84.0 cm)	Gustavo Almeida (BRA)	6:00.88	Lizardo Huamani (PER)	6:03.38	Jhoan Stiven García (COL)	6:12.30
4 × 100 metres relay	Colombia; Dylan Ocoro; Yeison González; Sebastián Palomeque; Deiner Guaitoto	42.04	Spain; Carlos Dorado; Mario Stefanov; Aritz Goñi; Nicolas Martínez	42.53	Argentina; David Vilela; Güercio Pérez; Agustín Coronel; Manuel Juárez	42.78
4 × 400 metres relay	Brazil; Vinícius de Brito; Vinícius Moraes; Victor Chaves; Carlos Eduardo Lara	3:17.03	Ecuador; Carlos Díaz; Alejandro Camacho; Jesús Delgado; Ian Andrey Pata	3:19.32	Colombia; Yeison González; Esteban Bermúdez; Kevin Santiago; Yampol Perea	3:19.32
10,000 metres track walk	Emiliano Barba (MEX)	43:10.3	Juan Pablo Rojas (COL)	43:40.1	Óscar Bocanegra (MEX)	43:40.7
High jump	Fred Martins (BRA)	2.02	Eric Guedes (BRA)	1.96	Jholeixon Rodríguez (ECU)	1.99
Pole vault	Ricardo Montes de Oca (VEN)	5.10	Fabio Marco (ESP)	4.80	Leonardo Olate (CHI)	4.40
Long jump	Murilo dos Santos (BRA)	7.18	Luis Batallas (ECU)	6.91	Aritz Goñi (ESP)	6.79
Triple jump	Carlos Dorado (ESP)	14.81	Santiago Theran (COL)	14.63	Pablo Buelvas (COL)	14.10
Shot put (5 kg)	Alessandro Borges (BRA)	18.89	Alberto Rodrigues (BRA)	18.87	Arnau Llorens (ESP)	17.74
Discus throw (1.5 kg)	Alberto Rodrigues (BRA)	58.67	Kevin Huang (CHI)	54.42	Jordan Ayovi (ECU)	52.16
Hammer throw (5 kg)	Luis Abillo (BRA)	62.69	Vicente Garces (CHI)	61.09	Jhonnier Rondón (COL)	59.62
Javelin throw (700 g)	Leonel Landriel (ARG)	63.97	Luís Miranda (BRA)	62.83	Franco Rondan (ARG)	54.39
Decathlon (U18)	Darío Rodríguez (MEX)	7139	Iker Moreno (ESP)	6656	Max Moraga (CHI)	6534

=== Girls ===
Event	Gold		Silver		Bronze	
100 metres (wind: 0.0 m/s)	Cayetana Chirinos (PER)	11.90	Angie Rivas (COL)	12.02	Yesenia Sánchez (COL)	12.04
200 metres (wind: -0.6 m/s)	Yesenia Sánchez (COL)	24.84	Morena Zárate (ARG)	24.98	Marina Delgado (ESP)	25.17
400 metres	Amanda da Silva (BRA)	55.76	Isabella Hurtado (COL)	56.42	Ximena Vásquez (PER)	57.04
800 metres	Marta Mitjans (ESP)	2:08.20	Lily Alder (ECU)	2:08.72	Juana Zuberbuhler (ARG)	2:09.89
1500 metres	Lily Alder (ECU)	4:31.06	Juana Zuberbuhler (ARG)	4:35.11	Pamela Barreto (ECU)	4:36.36
3000 metres	Karol Luna (COL)	10:31.44	Daniela Moreno (COL)	10:33.13	Luz Aarias (PER)	10:34.00
100 metres hurdles (76.2 cm) (wind: -0.3 m/s)	Elsa Badal (ESP)	13.73	Catalina Arellano (CHI)	13.87	Beatriz Monteiro (BRA)	13.92
400 metres hurdles	Amanda da Silva (BRA)	60.00	Itsaso Madariaga (ESP)	60.77	Elisa Castillo (MEX)	63.43
2000 m steeplechase	Nadia Soto (ESP)	6:50.58	Sofía Peña (MEX)	7:08.33	Lesly Paucar (ECU)	7:38.19
4 × 100 metres relay	Colombia; Luz Mariana Castro; Jackelin Riascos; Yessica Sánchez; Yesenia Sánchez	46.84	Chile; Jacinta Philipps; Dominga Phillips; Catalina Rozas; Blanca Yarur	47.15	Spain; Itsaso Madariaga; Marina Delgado; Elsa Badal; Marta Mitjans	47.80
4 × 400 metres relay	Brazil; Beatriz Monteiro; Maria Eduarda de Oliveira; Pietra Campbell; Amanda da Silva	3:49.84	Ecuador; Camille Romero; Pamela Barreto; Lily Alder; Génesis Cañola	3:52.34	Colombia; Yessica Sánchez; Emily Montaño; Angie Rivas; Isabella Hurtado	3:56.28
5000 m track walk	Karen Litardo (ECU)	23:21.0	Katherine Barreto (ECU)	23:30.4	Asly Santiago (MEX)	24:00.4
High jump	Ona Bonet (ESP)	1.78	Maria Eduarda de Oliveira (BRA)	1.76	Katherine Marque (ECU)	1.66
Pole vault	Luna Pabón (COL)	3.70	Luiza Camargos (BRA)	3.60	Paula Gómez (ARG)	3.60
Long jump	Angie Rivas (COL)	5.65	Jacinta Philipps (CHI)	5.55	Aileen Bautista (MEX)	5.48
Triple jump	Valery Arce (COL)	12.44	Valery Namen (COL)	12.16	María Barrios (ESP)	12.13
Shot put (3 kg)	Belsy Quiñónez (ECU)	15.96	Samanta Santos (BRA)	14.82	Andrea Tankeu (ESP)	14.79
Discus throw	Andrea Tankeu (ESP)	47.19	Samanta Santos (BRA)	44.89	Belsy Quiñónez (ECU)	43.36
Hammer throw (3 kg)	Andrea Sales (ESP)	65.57	Carmela Cocco (ARG)	61.50	Yenniver Veroes (VEN)	60.81
Javelin throw (500 g)	Erika Sellart (ESP)	47.33	Milagros Rosas (ARG)	46.80	Aimy Tanaka (PER)	44.71
Heptathlon (U18)	Yudisa Martínez (COL)	4957	Irene Bravo (ESP)	4940	Malena Bustamante (ARG)	4814

=== Mixed ===
Event	Gold		Silver		Bronze	
4 × 400 metres relay	Argentina; Manuel Juárez; Juana Zuberbuhler; Agustín Coronel; Celeste Molina	3:31.56	Spain; Nicolás Martínez; Marta Mitjans; Alejandro Ríos; Itsaso Madariaga	3:32.56	Ecuador; Carlos Díaz; Camille Romero; Jesús Delgado; Génesis Cañola	3:35.18

=== Medal table ===
* Host nation (Peru)

Rank	Nation	Gold	Silver	Bronze	Total
1	Brazil	12	8	3	23
2	Colombia	10	7	6	23
3	Spain	9	9	6	24
4	Ecuador	5	7	8	20
5	Argentina	3	4	7	14
6	Mexico	2	1	5	8
7	Peru*	1	1	3	5
8	Venezuela	1	0	1	2
9	Chile	0	5	4	9
10	Uruguay	0	1	0	1
Totals (10 entries)		43	43	43	129
