= Kaya Slater =

Scottish sprinter (born 2006)

Personal information
- Nationality: British (Scottish)
- Born: 26 April 2006 (age 20)

Sport
- Sport: Athletics
- Event: Sprint

Achievements and titles
- Personal bests: 60m: 7.54 (2026); 100m: 11.43 (2026); 200m: 23.99 (2026)
Medal record
Women's athletics
Representing Great Britain
European U20 Championships
Silver medal – second place	2025 Tampere	4x100 m relay

Kaya Slater (born 26 April 2006) is a British sprinter.

== Biography ==
A member of Falkirk Victoria Harriers and Reading Athletics Club, Slater was educated at Henley College. As a 17 year-old, she won the sprint double at the Scottish U20 Championships in 2023, with wins over both the 100 metres and 200 metres. She retained the 100 metres title the following year with a new personal best time of 11.84 seconds.

Slater won the silver medal with the British 4 x 100 metres team at the 2025 European Athletics U20 Championships in Tampere, alongside Lucy Tallon, Nell Desir and Mabel Akande. The same quartet had won the Mannheim Gala in Germany that summer, where Slater also set a new 100 metres personal best of 11.45 seconds. In August 2025, she finished runner-up to Sophie Thomas in the 100 metres at the Scottish Championships.

On 20 June 2026, she reached the semi-finals of the 100 metres at the 2026 British Championships. In July, Slater won the bronze medal at the England Athletics Championships over 100 metres in wind-assisted 11.44 seconds. She was named in the Scottish team for the 2026 Commonwealth Games in Glasgow, and competed in the women's 4 × 100 m relay.

== Personal life ==
Slater is eligible to run for Scotland through her father Roddy Slater, who represented Scotland as a sprinter in the 1980s and 1990s, and later worked as an athletics coach at Reading AC.
