= Otis Poole =

British high jumper

Personal information
- Born: 16 September 2007 (age 19)

Sport
- Sport: Athletics
- Event: High jump

Achievements and titles
- Personal bests: High jump: 2.20m (Birmingham, 2025)
Medal record
Men's athletics
Representing Great Britain
World U20 Championships
Bronze medal – third place	2026 Eugene	High jump
European U20 Championships
Silver medal – second place	2025 Tampere	High jump

Otis Poole is a British high jumper. He won the 2025 British Indoor Athletics Championships at the age of 17 years-old, and was a silver medalist at the 2025 European U20 Championships and a bronze medalist at the 2026 World U20 Championships.

== Biography ==
From Chippenham, Wiltshire, Poole attends Sheldon School. Poole is a member of Yate & District Athletic Club in Gloucestershire, where he is coached in the high jump by Joy Bray.

=== 2024: English U17 champion ===
Poole won the England Athletics U17 indoor high jump title in February 2024, with a personal best height of 2.03 metres. He won the U17 title outdoors in July 2024, with a personal best clearance of 2.07 metres. He won the England U20 indoor high jump title in February 2025 with a personal best of 2.09 metres.

=== 2025: British senior champion ===
He won the British Indoor Athletics Championships in Birmingham in February 2025 at the age of 17, with a personal best height of 2.20 metres to finish ahead of Kimani Jack. This came after he was a late entry into the competition, a few days before. For his effort, he was additionally given the 'performance of the day' award by the organisers. The clearance also moved him into the number two spot in the world U20 rankings. In July 2025, he cleared 2.12 metres; his best jump outdoors, to win the U20 high jump at the England Athletics Championships in Birmingham.

Poole was named in the British team for the high jump at the 2025 European Athletics U20 Championships in Tampere, Finland. Competing at the event in August 2025, he won the silver medal in the high jump with an outdoor personal best clearance of 2.19 metres, finishing only behind Elijah Pasquier of France. In October 2025, he was named on the British Athletics Olympic Futures Programme for 2025/26. He was nominated for British under-20 male athlete of the year by Athletics Weekly in November 2025.

=== 2026 ===
Poole won at the Mannheim International Gala in Germany with a jump of 2.14m in June 2026. That month, he placed joint-fourth at the 2026 British Championships with 2.15 metres. Poole was selected as part of the Great Britain team to compete at the 2026 World Athletics U20 Championships, winning the bronze medal in the high jump final having jumped an equal personal best of 2.21m to share the height with gold medal winner Younes Ayachi, but winning the bronze countback. It was the first medal in the discipline at the championships for Great Britain for 30 years, and came as 16 year-old teammate Samuel James placed fifth in the final. In October 2026, he was retained on the 2026/27 Olympic Futures Programme awarded by UK Athletics. The following month, he was again nominated for British U20 Male Athlete of the Year by Athletics Weekly.
