= 2026 World Athletics U20 Championships – Men's high jump =

Men's high jump at the 2026 World Athletics U20 Championships
- Venue: Hayward Field
- Dates: 6 August (Qualification); 8 August (Final)
- Competitors: 35 from 27 nations
- Winning height: 2.21 m

Medalists
gold medal	Younes Ayachi	Algeria
silver medal	Basant Meghwal	India
bronze medal	Otis Poole	Great Britain

The men's high jump at the 2026 World Athletics U20 Championships was held at Hayward Field in Eugene, United States on 6 and 8 August 2026.

== Records ==
U20 standing records prior to the 2026 World Athletics U20 Championships were as follows:

Record	Athlete & Nationality	Mark	Location	Date
World U20 Record	Dragutin Topić (YUG)	2.37 m	Plovdiv, Bulgaria	12 August 1990
World U20 Record	Steve Smith (GBR)	2.37 m	Seoul, South Korea	20 September 1992
Championship Record	Dragutin Topić (YUG)	2.37 m	Plovdiv, Bulgaria	12 August 1990
Championship Record	Steve Smith (GBR)	2.37 m	Seoul, South Korea	20 September 1992
World U20 Leading	Younes Ayachi (ALG)	2.28 m	Weinheim, Germany	6 February 2026

== Results ==
=== Qualification ===
Qualification took place in the morning session on 6 August 2026.

==== Group A ====
Place	Athlete	Nation	2.00	2.05	2.10	2.14	Results	Notes
1	Léo Courtine	Switzerland	o	o	o	o	2.14 m	q, PB
2	Leonard Nowoczyn	France	o	o	xo	o	2.14 m	q
2	Otis Poole	Great Britain	-	o	xo	o	2.14 m	q
4	Dawid Barański	Poland	o	xxo	o	o	2.14 m	q, PB
5	Basant Meghwal	India	o	o	o	xo	2.14 m	q
6	Yudai Sechi	Japan	o	o	xxo	xxo	2.14 m	q
7	Tatenda Chindowa	Zimbabwe	o	xxo	o	xxx	2.10 m	
8	Eduardo Carrolo	Portugal	o	o	xo	xxx	2.10 m	
9	Nicolas Clemente	Spain	xo	o	xo	xxx	2.10 m	
10	Jacob Thomä	Germany	o	xxo	xo	xxx	2.10 m	
11	Alan Hanna	Bahamas	o	o	xxo	xxx	2.10 m	
12	Jungi Kim	South Korea	xo	o	xxo	xxx	2.10 m	
13	Kenneth Phooko	South Africa	o	xo	xxx		2.05 m	
14	Iacopo Storai	Italy	o	xxo	xxx		2.05 m	
15	Vuk Šolaja	Serbia	xo	xxo	xxx		2.05 m	
15	Abdulrahman Mohammed Al-Malki	Qatar	xo	xxo	xxx		2.05 m	
17	Kristiyan Tsanev	Bulgaria	o	xxx			2.00 m	
18	Dereck Alexandre Alves	Brazil	xxo	xxx			2.00 m	

==== Group B ====
Place	Athlete	Nation	2.00	2.05	2.10	2.14	Results	Notes
1	Younes Ayachi	Algeria	-	o	o	o	2.14 m	q
1	Alberto Marzola	Italy	-	o	o	o	2.14 m	q
1	Samuel James	Great Britain	-	o	o	o	2.14 m	q
1	Maddox Krotzer	United States	o	o	o	o	2.14 m	q
5	Charalampos Alivizatos	Greece	o	xo	o	o	2.14 m	q
6	Joshua Harel	Israel	o	o	xxo	o	2.14 m	q
7	David Brown	Jamaica	o	o	xxo	xo	2.14 m	q
8	Gage Voyles	United States	-	xo	o	xxx	2.10 m	
9	Keigo Nakamura	Japan	xo	xo	o	xxx	2.10 m	
10	Vojtěch Zajíček	Czech Republic	o	o	xo	xxx	2.10 m	
11	Svante Svensson	Sweden	o	xo	xxo	xxx	2.10 m	
12	K. Ambriesh	India	o	xo	xxx		2.05 m	
12	Tharusha Dinushan Agampodi	Sri Lanka	o	xo	xxx		2.05 m	
14	Alejandro Muñoz	Spain	xxo	xo	xxx		2.05 m	
15	Nethya Sampath Jonikku	Sri Lanka	o	xxo	xxx		2.05 m	
16	Keon Schmidt-Gothan	Germany	o	xxx			2.00 m	
17	Tianci Li	China	xxo	xxx			2.00 m	
—	Matao le Roux	South Africa	xxx				NM	

=== Final ===
The final took place in the morning session on 8 August 2026.

Place	Athlete	Nation	2.06	2.12	2.17	2.21	2.24	2.26	2.28	Results	Notes
1st place, gold medalist(s)	Younes Ayachi	Algeria	o	o	o	o	xxx			2.21 m	
2nd place, silver medalist(s)	Basant Meghwal	India	o	xo	o	xo	xxx			2.21 m	PB
3rd place, bronze medalist(s)	Otis Poole	Great Britain	o	o	o	xxo	xxx			2.21 m	PB
4	Maddox Krotzer	United States	o	o	o	xxx				2.17 m	
5	Charalampos Alivizatos	Greece	o	o	xo	xxx				2.17 m	
5	Samuel James	Great Britain	o	o	xo	xxx				2.17 m	
7	Dawid Barański	Poland	xo	o	xo	xxx				2.17 m	PB
8	Joshua Harel	Israel	o	o	xxo	xxx				2.17 m	
9	David Brown	Jamaica	xo	o	xxo	xxx				2.17 m	
10	Alberto Marzola	Italy	o	o	xxx					2.12 m	
11	Leonard Nowoczyn	France	o	xo	xxx					2.12 m	
12	Yudai Sechi	Japan	o	xxo	xxx					2.12 m	
13	Léo Courtine	Switzerland	xo	xxx						2.06 m	
