= Ayla Hallberg Hossain =

Swedish long jumper

Personal information
- Born: 23 December 2006 (age 19)

Sport
- Sport: Athletics
- Event: Long jump
- Club: Turebergs FK

Achievements and titles
- Personal best(s): Long jump: 6.63m (Stockholm, 2026)
Medal record
Women's athletics
Representing Sweden
European U18 Championships
Gold medal – first place	2022 Jerusalem	Long jump

Ayla Hallberg Hossain (born 23 December 2006) is a Swedish long jumper. She became the European U18 Champion in 2022, and the senior Swedish Champion in 2025.

== Biography ==
From Tureberg in Stockholm County, Hallberg Hossain is a member of Turebergs FK. She expressed a desire to compete as a professional athlete from an early age. She had success as a junior athlete across multiple events including the 60 metres sprint, high jump and triple jump.

Hallberg Hossain won the gold medal in the long jump at the 2022 European Athletics U18 Championships in Jerusalem, Israel. As a fifteen year-old that year, she placed fourth on her senior debut for Sweden at Finnkampen, having been drafted in as a late replacement for Khaddi Sagnia. She placed fourth at the 2023 European Athletics U20 Championships. In August 2024, she won the Swedish U20 Championships in the 200 metres in Sollentuna. That month, she had a top-ten finish in the long jump at the 2024 World Athletics U20 Championships in Lima, Peru.

Hallberg Hossain placed third overall at the senior Swedish Indoor Athletics Championships on 22 February 2025, with a best jump of 6.38 metres in Växjö. In July 2025, she won the Nordic under-20 title with a personal best 6.57m Later that month, she also won the senior Swedish Athletics Championships in Karlstad, managing a wind-assisted jump of 6.56 metres to finish ahead of more experienced competitors Maja Askag and Khaddi Sagnia. She qualified for the final of the long jump at the 2025 European Athletics U20 Championships with the furthest mark in the preliminary round of 6.44 metres, ahead of Thea Brown of Great Britain, before placing fourth overall. In August, she placed second at Finnkampen in Stockholm.

Hallberg Hossain made a strong start to her 2026 indoor season with a win in the long jump at the BAUHAUS-Galan Indoor, a World Athletics Indoor Tour Silver meeting. She won with a distance of 6.56m, only marginally below her lifetime best, ahead Esraa Owis of Egypt. She jumped 6.42 metres to place fourth at the 2026 Swedish Indoor Championships in Stockholm. On 7 June, she jumped a person best 6.63 metres competing at the 2026 Bauhausgalan in Stockholm, part of the 2026 Diamond League.
