= Giuseppe Disabato =

Italian athlete (born 2006)

Personal information
- Nationality: Italian
- Born: 1 November 2006 (age 19)

Sport
- Country: Italy
- Sport: Athletics
- Event: Race Walking
- Club: G.S. Fiamme Gialle
Medal record
Men's athletics
Representing Italy
World U20 Championships
Bronze medal – third place	2024 Lima	10,000 m walk
European U20 Championships
Silver medal – second place	2025 Tampere	10,000 m walk
Bronze medal – third place	2023 Jerusalem	10,000 m walk
European U18 Championships
Silver medal – second place	2022 Jerusalem	10,000 m walk

Giuseppe Disabato (born 1 November 2006) is an Italian race walker.

== Career ==
From near Bari, he is a member of the athletics club Amatori Atletica Acquaviva, and is coached by his uncle, Tony Esposito.

In June 2022, he became Italian under-18 champion in the 10,000 metres race walk in Milan. He won the silver medal in the 10,000 m race walk at the 2022 European Athletics U18 Championships in Jerusalem, Israel. He won a bronze medal in the 10,000 metres race walk at the 2023 European Athletics U20 Championships in Jerusalem, Israel.

He was part of the Italian team which placed fifth in the 10 km road race at the 2024 World Athletics Race Walking Team Championships in Antalya, Turkey. He won the Italian junior championships and was a bronze medalist over 10,000 metres at the 2024 World Athletics U20 Championships in Lima, Peru.

He set a championship record in winning the men's U20 10km race walk event at the 2025 European Race Walking Championships in Podebrady, Czech Republic in May 2025. He was a silver medalist in the 10,000 metres race walk finishing behind Spaniard Joan Querol at the 2025 European Athletics U20 Championships in Tampere, Finland.
