= 2025 Ibero-American U18 Championships in Athletics =

2nd Ibero-American U18 Championships in Athletics
- Dates: 19–20 July 2025
- Host city: Luque, Asunción, Paraguay
- Venue: Parque Olímpico Pista de Atletismo
- Level: U18
- Type: Outdoor
- Events: 41
- Participation: 16 nations

2025 Ibero-American U18 Championships in Athletics was the second edition of the competition organised by Asociación Iberoamericana de Atletismo for athletes under the age of 18. It took place between 19 and 20 July at the Parque Olímpico in Luque, Asunción, Paraguay.

== Medal summary ==
=== Boys ===
Event	Gold		Silver		Bronze	
100 metres (wind: -0.1 m/s)	Mariano Fiol (PER)	10.50	Santiago Lazar (URU)	10.60	Pedro Nunes (BRA)	10.76
200 metres (wind: +2.0 m/s)	Mariano Fiol (PER)	21.18	Pedro Nunes (BRA)	21.28	Santiago Lazar (URU)	21.45
400 metres	Alejandro Morante (ESP)	48.07	Wilton dos Santos (BRA)	48.47	Richard Peña (VEN)	48.61
800 metres	Giancarlo Bravo (PER)	1:50.11	Josué Barros (BRA)	1:51.41	Leonardo Guerrero (ECU)	1:53.72
1500 metres	Sergio Granado (ESP)	3:55.37	Thomas Castro (COL)	3:56.31	Pedro Jaramillo (MEX)	3:57.10
3000 metres	Enrique Ramírez (MEX)	8:36.20	Pablo Ñauta (ECU)	8:37.26	Guillem Cuartero (ESP)	8:42.45
110 metres hurdles (91.4 cm) (wind: +2.3 m/s)	Santiago Quintero (VEN)	13.55	Alonso Guzmán (CHI)	13.56	Ángel Ramírez (MEX)	13.67
400 metres hurdles (84.0 cm)	Stiven Méndez (ECU)	51.47	Santiago Quintero (VEN)	51.51	Johnata Vinícius Moura (BRA)	52.18
2000 metres steeplechase (84.0 cm)	Biel Vivacqua (ESP)	5:58.34	Henrique Rodrigues (BRA)	5:58.58	Manuel Espino (MEX)	6:00.16
4 × 100 metres relay	Brazil; Júlio Garcia; Johnata Vinícius Moura; Giancarlo da Conceição; Pedro Nunes	41.38	Chile; Franco Stefoni; Mateo Fernández; Lucas Moreno; Juan José García	41.95	Peru; Ian Matos; Daniel del Castillo; Eduardo Rentería; Mariano Fiol	42.06
10,000 metres track walk	Marc Suárez (ESP)	43:59.17	Hugo Mamani (PER)	45:27.92	Gabriel González (VEN)	45:32.15
High jump	Santiago Montalva (CHI)	2.00	Ernesto Carabalí (ECU)	1.95	Santino Boero (ARG)	1.95
Pole vault	Andy Espinoza (ECU)	5.05	Carlo Cruz (MEX)	4.55	Juan de Díos Patillo (CHI)	4.40
Long jump	Guilherme da Silva (BRA)	7.11	Brendan Pérez (VEN)	7.10	Nicolás Cousillas (ARG)	7.00
Triple jump	Alexander Cordeiro (BRA)	15.46w	Guilherme da Silva (BRA)	15.30	Nicolás Guerra (ESP)	15.27
Shot put (5 kg)	Pyetro Souza (BRA)	18.15	Ricardo Lobos (CHI)	17.80	Mathias Tobar (ESA)	17.63
Discus throw (1.5 kg)	Brandon Delgado (MEX)	58.64	Gabriel Leite (BRA)	55.15	Yeray Royuela (ESP)	54.53
Hammer throw (5 kg)	Patry Váldez (ECU)	72.47	Maximo Gutiérrez (MEX)	64.76	Salvador García (PER)	64.24
Javelin throw (700 g)	Pietro Silva (BRA)	75.53	Pedro da Silva (BRA)	72.79	Karlo Saucedo (MEX)	66.49
Decathlon (U18)	Paulo Henrique Krul (BRA)	7646	João Arthur da Silva (BRA)	7140	Manuel Vilela (ARG)	6364

=== Girls ===
Event	Gold		Silver		Bronze	
100 metres (wind: +0.9 m/s)	Hakelly de Souza (BRA)	11.53	Patricia Sine (DOM)	11.92	Cayetana Chirinos (PER)	11.92
200 metres (wind: 0.0 m/s)	Hakelly de Souza (BRA)	23.66	Pilar Rodríguez (CHI)	24.98	Ana Cera (VEN)	24.53
400 metres	Kenya Maturana (MEX)	54.43	Alisson Martínez (MEX)	55.11	Kristel Méndez (ECU)	55.51
800 metres	Alisson Martínez (MEX)	2:10.61	Antonella Lanuza (CRC)	2:10.93	Valentina Cancino (CHI)	2:10.96
1500 metres	Valentina Cancino (CHI)	4:28.10	Irene Pernia (ARG)	4:29.61	Zoe Gorsky (ARG)	4:31.60
3000 metres	Irene Pernia (ARG)	9:39.61	Sabela Castelo (ESP)	9:40.04	Zoe Gorsky (ARG)	9:48.11
100 metres hurdles (76.2 cm) (wind: +0.8 m/s)	Beatriz Monteiro (BRA)	13.55	Iraia Vicente (ESP)	13.80	Larissa de Morais (BRA)	14.02
400 metres hurdles	Maiza Silva (BRA)	60.39	Kenya Maturana (MEX)	60.83	Larissa de Morais (BRA)	61.22
2000 m steeplechase	Demeku Paniagua (ESP)	6:45.93	Sofía Fregona (ARG)	6:54.83	Antonella Bonomi (URU)	7:03.09
4 × 100 metres relay	Chile; Maite Hernández; Pilar Rodríguez; María Paz Barrera; Roxana Ramírez	46.43	Brazil; Larissa Schon; Maiza Silva; Beatriz Monteiro; Hakelly de Souza	46.94	Mexico; Rebeca López; Camila Vega; Michel Ramos; Jennifer Tirado	47.59
5000 m track walk	Icia Ares (ESP)	23:27.46	Danna Rivera (COL)	23:44.83	Naomi Luis (MEX)	23:45.03
High jump	Jeraldine Pata (ECU)	1.78	Lola Verdini (ARG)	1.69	Maria Clara Francez (BRA)	1.66
Pole vault	Alba Benito (ESP)	3.85	Agustina Viale (ARG)	3.35	Norma Canossa (CRC)	3.30
Long jump	Gift Isaac (ESP)	6.22	Milagros D'Amico (ARG)	5.72	Alexandra Segura (ECU)	5.58
Triple jump	Gift Isaac (ESP)	13.25	Karine Estefabe (BRA)	13.04w	Paola Sandoval (MEX)	12.24
Shot put (3 kg)	Tyra Caicedo (ECU)	14.84	Elsa Parrilla (ESP)	14.74	Isadora Ferreira (BRA)	14.64
Discus throw	Arielle Ngole (ESP)	43.82	Leticia Dominelli (BRA)	43.10	Tyra Caicedo (ECU)	42.91
Hammer throw (3 kg)	Maria Laura Sales (BRA)	61.41	Alison Salinas (MEX)	59.34	Isis Rodríguez (MEX)	56.73
Javelin throw (500 g)	Ilsa Córdoba (COL)	48.80	Luisa Ortega (COL)	48.08	Kimberly Flores (PER)	45.46
Heptathlon (U18)	Angelica Zapata (VEN)	4806	Danna Ramírez (MEX)	4415	Lara González (PAR)	3886

=== Mixed ===
Event	Gold		Silver		Bronze	
4 × 400 metres relay	Colombia; José Miguel Valencia; Emily Román; Marlon Acevedo; Sara Cuesta	3:29.99	Mexico; Rodrigo Castellanos; Alisson Martínez; Franko Escarrega; Kenya Maturana	3:31.33	Brazil; Rychardy Moura; Maiza Silva; Johnata Vinícius Moura; Hakelly de Souza	3:31.40

=== Medal table ===
* Host nation (Paraguay)

Rank	Nation	Gold	Silver	Bronze	Total
1	Brazil	11	11	7	29
2	Spain	10	3	3	16
3	Ecuador	5	2	4	11
4	Mexico	4	7	8	19
5	Chile	3	4	2	9
6	Peru	3	1	4	8
7	Colombia	2	3	0	5
8	Venezuela	2	2	3	7
9	Argentina	1	5	5	11
10	Uruguay	0	1	2	3
11	Costa Rica	0	1	1	2
12	Dominican Republic	0	1	0	1
13	El Salvador	0	0	1	1
13	Paraguay*	0	0	1	1
Totals (14 entries)		41	41	41	123
