= Rafael Mahiques Gil =

Spanish athlete

Rafael Mahiques
- Rafael winning the European U20 Championships for the Javelin Throw.

Personal information
- Nationality: Spanish
- Born: Rafael Mahiques Gil; 14 July 2006 (age 20) Gandia, Spain
- Height: 6 ft 2.02 in (188 cm)
- Weight: 93 kg (205 lb)

Sport
- Sport: Athletics
- Event: Javelin throw
- Club: C.C. El Garbí
- Coached by: Juan Vicente Escolano

Achievements and titles
- Personal best: 77.60 m (2025) NU20R
Medal record
Men's athletics
Representing Spain
European Athletics U20 Championships
Gold medal – first place	2025 Tampere	Javelin throw

Rafael Mahiques Gil (born 14 July 2006) is a Spanish track and field athlete who specializes in the javelin throw. He is the 2025 European U20 champion and the current Spanish national record holder in the U20 category.

== Career ==
Mahiques began his athletic training with the Club de Córrer el Garbí in Gandia, training under coach Juan Vicente Escolano. He competed in youth categories with the 700g javelin, recording a best of 57.88 metres in 2023 before transitioning to the senior 800g implement.

In 2025, Mahiques established himself as a leading junior athlete in Europe. On 26 July 2025, he set a new Spanish national under-20 record with a throw of 77.60 metres during the Spanish U20 Championships. This mark improved upon his previous personal best and placed him at the top of the European U20 entry lists for the season.

== International competitions ==
Mahiques made his major international debut at the 2025 European Athletics U20 Championships in Tampere, Finland. In the qualifying round on 9 August, he secured a place in the final with a throw of 72.07 metres.

In the final held on 10 August, Mahiques took an early lead in the first round with 73.77 metres. He eventually secured the gold medal with a fourth-round throw of 76.30 metres, defeating Germany's Oskar Jänicke (76.17 m) and Poland's Roch Krukowski (76.01 m). This victory was the first time a Spanish athlete won the European U20 title in the men's javelin throw.

== Achievements ==
Year	Competition	Venue	Position	Event	Notes
Representing Spain
2025	European Athletics U20 Championships	Tampere, Finland	1st	Javelin throw	76.30 m
