= Jana Becker =

German middle-distance runner (born 2006)

Personal information
- Full name: Jana Marie Becker
- Born: 11 May 2006 (age 20)

Sport
- Sport: Athletics
- Event: Middle-distance running

Achievements and titles
- Personal bests: 800 m: 1:59.08 (Birmingham, 2026)
Medal record
Women's athletics
Representing Germany
European U20 Championships
Gold medal – first place	2025 Tampere	800 m
Silver medal – second place	2025 Tampere	4 × 400 m relay
European U18 Championships
Silver medal – second place	2022 Jerusalem	800 m

Jana Marie Becker (born 11 May 2006) is a German runner who competes over 400 metres and 800 metres. She was German senior indoor champion and European U20 champion over 800 metres in 2025.

== Biography ==
She is a member of Königstein Athletics Club in Königstein im Taunus. She won the silver medal over 800 metres at the 2022 European Athletics U18 Championships in a time of 2:09.52 in Jerusalem, Israel.

In July 2024, she was a member of the Königsteiner LV trio with Vanda Skupin-Alfa and Sarah Köcher which won the 3 × 800 metres relay at the German Championahips. She ran the anchor leg in the qualifying round a for the German team which went on to have a sixth place finish in the final of the women's 4 × 400 metres relay team at the 2024 World Athletics U20 Championships in Lima, Peru in August 2024.

She won the German U20 Indoor Championships title over 800 metres in February 2025, in an indoor personal best time of 2:04.20 in Dortmund. The following week, she followed that up by winning the senior German National title at the German Indoor Athletics Championships, again in Dortmund, over 800 metres.

She won the gold medal in the 800 metres at the 2025 European Athletics U20 Championships in Tampere, Finland in a time of in 2:01.67, overtaking Ziva Remic on the line to win by nine hundredths of a second. Just an hour later at the same championships, she was a silver medalist in the women’s 4 × 400 metres relay, after being a late replacement into the team after Germany's silver medalist in the individual 400 metres, Johanna Martin, had to withdraw from the squad. She set a new personal best for the 800 metres, breaking the two minute barrier for the first time, in August 2025 in Pfungstadt, Germany. The time moved her to second in the Germany senior women rankings for the season, and made her the fastest European in the U20 youth category, and number two in the U20 world rankings.

In August, she competed at the 2026 European Athletics Championships in Birmingham, England, in the women's 800 metres and ran a new personal best of 1:59.08.
