= Aatu Kangasniemi =

Finnish athlete (born 2006)

Personal information
- Nationality: Finnish
- Born: 25 February 2006 (age 20)

Sport
- Sport: Athletics
- Events: Shot put, Hammer throw

Achievements and titles
- Personal bests: Shot Put: 18.28m (Kuortane, 2025); Hammer: 67.27m (Espoo, 2025)
Medal record
Men's athletics
Representing Finland
European U20 Championships
Silver medal – second place	2025 Tampere	Shot put
Bronze medal – third place	2025 Tampere	Hammer throw
European Youth Olympic Festival
Silver medal – second place	2023 Maribor	Hammer throw
Silver medal – second place	2023 Maribor	Shot put
European U18 Championships
Silver medal – second place	2022 Jerusalem	Hammer throw
Bronze medal – third place	2022 Jerusalem	Shot put

Aatu Kangasniemi (born 25 February 2006) is a Finnish hammer thrower and shot putter.

== Career ==
Kangasniemi is from Askola in Finland. Showing aptitude for throwing events at a young age, in 2020 he threw a four-kilogram hammer in Nastola to 73.47 meters, which set a new Finnish age-group record for 14-year-old boys. Whilst competing as a member of Nurmijärvi Athletics in 2021, threw the hammer in Lohja to 81.96 metres, to set a Finnish record for 15-year-olds.

The following year, at the age of 16, Kangasniemi won silver in the hammer throw at the 2022 European Athletics U18 Championships in Jerusalem, Israel, with a personal best of 77.74 m. He also won the bronze medal in the shot put on the same day, with a personal best of 19.48 metres. At the 2023 European Youth Olympic Festival in Maribor, Slovenia, Kangasniemi won two silver medals in the shot put and hammer throw.

Competing at the 2024 World Athletics U20 Championships in Lima, Peru, in August 2024, he placed seventh in the final of the hammer throw. In September 2024, Kangasniemi set the Finnish record for the men's shot put by an 18-year-old outdoors, with an effort of 17.70 meters. Kangasniemi finished second in the shot put at the 2025 senior Finnish Indoor Athletics Championships in Kuortane, with a personal best distance of 18.28 metres with the senior weighted shot put.

In July 2025, he was selected for the 2025 European Athletics U20 Championships in Tampere, Finland. He won the bronze medal in the hammer throw, throwing 74.41 metres, to finish behind compatriot Mico Lampinen and Armin Szabados of Hungary. On the same day, he also won a silver medal in the shot put at the championships.
