= Teddy Wilson (sprinter) =

British athlete

Personal information
- Nationality: British
- Born: 29 November 2006 (age 19)

Sport
- Sport: Athletics
- Event: Sprinter

Achievements and titles
- Personal bests: 60m 6.66 (London, 2025); 100m 10.24 (Birmingham, 2025); 200m 20.70 (London, 2025)
Medal record
Men's athletics
Representing Great Britain
World U20 Championships
Silver medal – second place	2024 Lima	4×100m relay
European U20 Championships
Silver medal – second place	2025 Tampere	100 m
Representing England
Commonwealth Youth Games
Gold medal – first place	2023 Trinbago	100 m
Silver medal – second place	2023 Trinbago	Mixed 4x100 m relay

Teddy Wilson (born 29 November 2006) is a British sprinter.

== Early life ==
From North London, he attended Bishop Stopford's School in Enfield. He has said he was inspired to take up sprinting after watching the London 2012 Olympic Games.

== Career ==
In August 2021, Wilson broke the British U15 100m record, running 10.78 seconds at the England Athletics U15 & U17 Championships, in Manchester. He competed in the 100 metres at the European Athletics U18 Championships in Jerusalem in 2022.

He equalled the European Under-18 100m record with a personal best of 10.26 seconds at the Mannheim International in June 2023. That run also broke the Mark Lewis-Francis long-standing UK under-17 record. In August 2023, he won gold in the 100m at the 2023 Commonwealth Youth Games in a time of 10.37 seconds in Port of Spain ahead of compatriot Ebuka Nwokeji, having been named as team captain for the English team. He was also a medalist in the mixed 4 x 100 m relay alongside Noah Hanson, Thea Brown and Mabel Akande.

He finished fifth in the final of the 100 metres at the senior British Athletics Championships in June 2024. He competed at the 2024 World Athletics U20 Championships in Lima, Peru in August 2024. He qualified for the final of the 100 metres, where he placed seventh. Later in the Championships, he won the silver medal in the 4 x 100 metres relay, running the British team's anchor leg.

In October 2024, he was nominated by Athletics Weekly for best British male junior. In November 2024, he was named by British Athletics on the Olympic Futures Programme for 2025.

In July 2025, he won the title over 100 metres at the England U20 Championships in Birmingham with a time of 10.24 seconds (+1.4) personal best. The following day, he also won the U20 title over 200 metres in 20.83 seconds, finishing ahead of Nwokeji and Jake Odey-Jordan. He was named in the British team for the 100 metres at the 2025 European Athletics U20 Championships in Tampere, winning his heat in 10.54 seconds into a 1.7 m/s headwind, before sharing the silver medal in the final with Dutchman Jozuah Revierre, with both men unable to separated in 10.47 seconds (-0.7), behind Ander Garaiar. In October 2025, he was retained on the British Athletics Olympic Futures Programme for 2025/26.

Wilson was named in the British squad for the 4 x 100 metres relay at the 2026 World Athletics Relays in Gaborone, Botswana, but had to withdraw due to injury. In October 2026, he was retained on the 2026/27 Olympic Futures Programme awarded by UK Athletics.
