= Rafferty Mirfin =

British middle-distance runner (born 2008)

Personal information
- Born: 9 February 2008 (age 18)

Sport
- Sport: Athletics
- Event(s): Middle-distance running, Cross country running

Achievements and titles
- Personal best(s): 800m: 1:47.67 (Manchester, 2025; 1500m: 4:01.02 (Barnsley, 2025)
Medal record
Men's athletics
Representing Great Britain
European U20 Championships
Gold medal – first place	2025 Tampere	800 m

Rafferty Mirfin (born 9 February 2008) is a British middle-distance and cross-country runner. He won the gold medal at the 2025 European Athletics U20 Championships over 800 metres.

== Career ==
He is a member of Skyrac Athletics Club in Guiseley, Yorkshire. He won the U20 title over 800 metres at the English Institute of Sport, Sheffield, at the Northern Senior, U20, & U17 Indoor Championships in January 2025, winning in a time of 1:52:75. He won both the 800 metres and 1500 metres at the 2025 Yorkshire Track and Field Championships.

He was named in the British team for the 800 metres at the 2025 European Athletics U20 Championships in Tampere, Finland. He won his preliminary heat to qualify for the final in 1:48.40. In the final, he was part of a British 1-2-3 across the line alongside Tom Waterworth and William Rabjohns, although Ranjohns was later disqualified following an appeal by the Spanish federation despite being the first finisher, with Mirfin awarded victory for his first European age-group gold medal, ahead of fellow Brit Tom Waterworth in silver and Aaron Ceballos of Spain promoted to bronze. He was nominated for British under-20 male athlete of the year by Athletics Weekly in November 2025.
