= Lenny Chanteur =

French athlete (born 2006)

Personal information
- Born: 14 March 2006 (age 20) Sarcelles, France
- Height: 180 cm (5 ft 11 in)
- Weight: 70 kg (154 lb)

Sport
- Country: France
- Sport: Athletics
- Event: Sprint

Achievements and titles
- Personal bests: 60m: 6.80 (2025); 100m: 10.22 (2025); 200m: 21.25 (2025)
Medal record
Men's athletics
Representing France
European U20 Championships
Gold medal – first place	2025 Tampere	4x100 m relay

Lenny Chanteur (born 14 March 2006) is a French sprinter. He won the 200 metres at the 2026 French Indoor Athletics Championships.

== Biography ==
He is from Piscop in Val-d'Oise and came to athletics relatively late at the age of 16 yesrs-old, having previously played football and handball. He is a member of Domont Athletics in Domont. In Châteauroux, he was runner-up over 100 metres at the French junior championships running 10.60 seconds. His performance earned him his first selection for the French national team for the 2023 European Athletics U20 Championships in Jerusalem, Israel, in the 4 x 100 metres relay.

He ran a personal best for the 100 metres to 10.22 seconds in 2025 to move to the top of the European under-20 rankings. He qualified for the 100m final at the 2025 European Athletics U20 Championships in Tampere, Finland, despite losing a shoe mid-race, placing second in his semifinal in 10.61 (-0.1m/s). He subsequently had a fifth place finish in the final in 10.50 seconds. Chanteur ran the second leg of the French team's gold medal winning 4x100m relay men's team.

He received his first call-up to a senior French team for the 4x100m relay at the 2025 World Athletics Championships in Tokyo, Japan. In September 2025, he competed in the men's 4 x 100 metres at the 2025 World Championships in Tokyo, Japan, as the French team placed seventh.

Competing indoors in 2026, he won the 200 metres national title at the 2026 French Indoor Athletics Championships, running 20.68 seconds in the final. In May, he ran at the 2026 World Athletics Relays in the men's 4 × 100 metres relay in Gaborone, Botswana.
