= 2022 European Athletics U18 Championships =

European athletics competition

3rd European Athletics Youth Championships
- Dates: 4–7 July 2022
- Host city: Jerusalem
- Venue: Givat Ram Stadium
- Level: Youth
- Type: Outdoor
- Events: 40
- Participation: 957 athletes from 48 nations

The 2022 European Athletics U18 Championships was the third edition of the biennial continental athletics competition for European athletes aged fifteen to seventeen. It was held in Jerusalem from 4 to 7 July at the Hebrew University Stadium. The event returned after a four-year hiatus since Győr 2018, because Rieti 2020 was first postponed to 2021 and then cancelled due to the COVID-19 pandemic. A future edition has been awarded to Rieti for 2026.

== Medal summary ==
Legend

- CR (Championship Best), PB (Personal Best; =PB: repeat/reconfirm Personal Best), SB (Season Best), WU18L (World U18 Lead), EU18L (European U18 Lead), EU18B (European U18 Best Performance/Record), NU18B (National U18 Best Performance/Record)

=== Men ===
Event	Gold		Silver		Bronze	
100 metres	Marek Zakrzewski; Poland	10.32 CR	Isak Hughes; Sweden	10.36 NU18B	Benedikt Thomas Wallstein; Germany	10.44 NU18B
200 metres	Dejan Ottou; France	21.10 PB	Eduardo Longobardi; Italy	21.22	Michał Gorzkowicz; Poland	21.34 PB
400 metres	David García; Spain	46.67 CR	Árpád Kovács; Hungary	47.87	Adrian Wójciak; Poland	48.13 PB
800 metres	Jakub Dudycha; Czech Republic	1:51.35	Noam Mamu; Israel	1:51.79	Davide De Rosa; Italy	1:51.81
1500 metres	Niels Laros; Netherlands	3:49.99 CR	Andreas Fjeld Halvorsen; Norway	3:52.14	Tendai Nyabadza; Great Britain	3:52.47
3000 metres	Niels Laros; Netherlands	8:11.49	Andreas Fjeld Halvorsen; Norway	8:13.48	Edward Bird; Great Britain	8:14.59 PB
110 metres hurdles	David Pronk; Netherlands	13.50 PB	Némo Rase; Belgium	13.56	Nils Leifert; Germany	13.60 PB
400 metres hurdles	Bastian Elnan Aurstad; Norway	50.89 WU18L	Fintan Dewhirst; Ireland	51.65 PB	Gergő Takács; Hungary	51.77 PB
2000 metres steeplechase	Sergio del Barrio; Spain	5:38.55 CR PB WU18L	Hicham Errbibih; France	5:40.35 NU18B	Aarno Liebl; Switzerland	5:40.45 NU18B
Swedish medley relay	Italy; Francesco Inzoli; Filippo Padovan; Eduardo Longobardi; Davide De Rosa; Sofian Safraoui and Luca Marsicovetere*	1:52.69 CR	Norway; Jonathan Hertwig-Ødegaard; Sebastian Berntsen; Even Elias Grannes Pedersen; Bastian Elnan Aurstad; Sindre Strønstad-Løseth*	1:53.36 SB	Great Britain; Teddy Wilson; Dejaune Lingard; Dean Patterson; Tom Gaunce; Callum Webb and Jac Patterson*	1:53.75 SB
10,000 m walk	Frederick Weigel; Germany	44:01.60 CR	Giuseppe Disabato; Italy	44:16.55 PB	Miguel Espinosa; Spain	44:46.88 PB
High jump	Mattia Furlani; Italy	2.15	Michaelis Christofi; Cyprus; Jakub Walecki; Poland	2.13 PB 2.13 PB		
Pole vault	Michał Gawenda; Poland	5.10	Valentin Imsand; Switzerland	5.10	Linus Jönsson; Sweden	5.10 =PB
Long jump	Mattia Furlani; Italy	8.04 CR PB	Thomas Martinez; France	7.73 NU18B	Francesco Inzoli; Italy	7.58 PB
Triple jump	Lachezar Valchev; Bulgaria	15.76 EU20L	Nicolò Cannavale; Italy	15.45 PB	Vasil Rusenov; Bulgaria	15.18 PB
Shot put	Ali Peker; Turkey	21.03 WU18L	Georg Harpf; Germany	20.16	Aatu Kangasniemi; Finland	19.48
Discus throw	Mykhailo Brudin; Ukraine	64.51 CR	Yannick Rolvink; Netherlands	63.06 NU18B	Mihai Damian Motorca; Romania	58.18
Hammer throw	Iosif Kesidis; Cyprus	78.92	Aatu Kangasniemi; Finland	77.74 PB	Georgios Papanastasiou; Greece	77.37
Javelin throw	Topi Parviainen; Finland	84.52 EU18B	Máté Horváth; Hungary	73.72	Ryan Jansen; Netherlands	72.10
Decathlon	Amadeus Gräber; Germany	7626 CR	Leo Göransson; Sweden	7609 PB	Alexandre Montagné; France	7591 PB

* Indicates that the athlete participated only in the preliminary heats and also received a medal as part of the relay.

=== Women ===
Event	Gold		Silver		Bronze	
100 metres	Nia Wedderburn-Goodison; Great Britain	11.39 CR	Chelsea Kadiri; Germany	11.50 PB	Renee Regis; Great Britain	11.58 =PB
200 metres	Faith Akinbileje; Great Britain	23.36	Holly Okuku; Germany	24.03	Lara Jurčić; Croatia	24.22 PB
400 metres	Charlotte Henrich; Great Britain	53.54 PB	Lurdes Gloria Manuel; Czech Republic	53.61	Edanur Tulum; Turkey	53.96 NU18B
800 metres	Malin Hoelsveen; Norway	2:09.29	Jana Becker; Germany	2:09.52	Iris Downes; Great Britain	2:09.56
1500 metres	Annie Mann; Great Britain	4:23.41 PB	Ayça Fidanoglu; Turkey	4:23.98	Shirin Kerber; Switzerland	4:24.46
3000 metres	Sofia Thøgersen; Denmark	9:20.56	Jess Bailey; Great Britain	9:32.74	Edibe Yagiz; Turkey	9:34.53 PB
100 metres hurdles	Mia McIntosh; Great Britain	13.05 CR	Essi Niskala; Finland	13.29	Sofia Pizzato; Italy	13.33 NU18B
400 metres hurdles	Ophelia Pye; Great Britain	58.09 CR	Zoë Laureys; Belgium	58.22	Stephanie Okoro; Great Britain	58.44 PB
2000 metres steeplechase	Jolanda Kallabis; Germany	6:20.22 CR NU18B; WU18L WU20L	Adia Budde; Germany	6:28.09 PB	Sofia Thøgersen; Denmark	6:29.68 SB
Swedish Medley relay	Great Britain; Renee Regis; Faith Akinbileje; Rebecca Grieve; Etty Sisson	2:07.18 CR EU18B	Italy; Alice Pagliarini; Ludovica Galuppi; Elisa Marcello; Ngalula Kabangu	2:07.35 NU18B	Spain; Ainhoa Repáraz; Laura Martínez; Adriana Lopez; Ana Prieto	2:08.80 SB
5000 m walk	Sofia Santacreu; Spain	22:46.34 NU18B	Martina Sciannamea; Italy	23:15.40	Léna Auvray; France	23:26.07
High jump	Angelina Topić; Serbia	1.92	Johanna Göring; Germany	1.88	Merel Maes; Belgium	1.86 SB
Pole vault	Iliana Triantafyllou; Greece	4.05	Viktorie Ondrová; Czech Republic	3.95	Ella Uddenäs; Sweden	3.85
Long jump	Ayla Hallberg Hossain; Sweden	6.39 CR	Brina Likar; Slovenia	6.30	Plamena Chakarova; Bulgaria; Laura Martínez; Spain	6.24 PB 6.24 PB
Triple jump	Clémence Rougier; France	13.72 EU20L	Teodora Boberić; Serbia	13.36 PB	Natalija Dragojević; Serbia	13.04 PB
Shot put	Cleo Agyepong; Great Britain	17.39 EU18L	Chantal Rimke; Germany	16.86 NU18B	Paige Stevens; Great Britain	16.69 PB
Discus throw	Curly Brown; Germany	50.64 PB	Princesse Hyman; France	50.27 PB	Anna Kicińska; Poland	46.60 PB
Hammer throw	Valentina Savva; Cyprus	70.28	Villő Viszkeleti; Hungary	69.11 PB	Emilia Kolokotroni; Cyprus	65.35 PB
Javelin throw	Veera Sauna-Aho; Finland	52.22	Suze Zeevat; Netherlands	50.68	Orinta Navikaitė; Lithuania	50.64 PB
Heptathlon	Jana Koščak; Croatia	6106	Sarolta Kriszt; Hungary	5794	Pia Meßing; Germany	5690

== Medal table ==
* Host nation (Israel)

Rank	Nation	Gold	Silver	Bronze	Total
1	Great Britain (GBR)	8	1	7	16
2	Germany (GER)	4	7	3	14
3	Italy (ITA)	3	5	3	11
4	Netherlands (NED)	3	2	1	6
5	Spain (ESP)	3	0	3	6
6	France (FRA)	2	3	2	7
7	Norway (NOR)	2	3	0	5
8	Finland (FIN)	2	2	1	5
9	Poland (POL)	2	1	3	6
10	Cyprus (CYP)	2	1	1	4
11	Sweden (SWE)	1	2	2	5
12	Czech Republic (CZE)	1	2	0	3
13	Turkey (TUR)	1	1	2	4
14	Serbia (SRB)	1	1	1	3
15	Bulgaria (BUL)	1	0	2	3
16	Croatia (CRO)	1	0	1	2
16	Denmark (DEN)	1	0	1	2
16	Greece (GRE)	1	0	1	2
19	Ukraine (UKR)	1	0	0	1
20	Hungary (HUN)	0	4	1	5
21	Belgium (BEL)	0	2	1	3
22	Switzerland (SUI)	0	1	2	3
23	Ireland (IRL)	0	1	0	1
23	Israel (ISR)*	0	1	0	1
23	Slovenia (SLO)	0	1	0	1
26	Lithuania (LTU)	0	0	1	1
26	Romania (ROU)	0	0	1	1
Totals (27 entries)		40	41	40	121

== Participating nations ==
957 competitors (477 boys and 480 girls) from 48 countries are expected to compete.

- Albania (1)
- Andorra (2)
- Armenia (2)
- Austria (15)
- Azerbaijan (1)
- Belgium (15)
- Bosnia and Herzegovina (3)
- Bulgaria (15)
- Croatia (11)
- Cyprus (18)
- Czech Republic (23)
- Denmark (18)
- Estonia (23)
- Finland (50)
- France (35)
- Georgia (1)
- Germany (51)
- Great Britain & NI (42)
- Greece (50)
- Hungary (44)
- Iceland (3)
- Ireland (20)
- Israel (16) (host)
- Italy (53)
- Kosovo (2)
- Latvia (23)
- Liechtenstein (1)
- Lithuania (16)
- Luxembourg (3)
- Malta (3)
- Moldova (5)
- Monaco (1)
- Montenegro (1)
- Netherlands (19)
- North Macedonia (1)
- Norway (23)
- Poland (41)
- Portugal (15)
- Romania (31)
- San Marino (1)
- Serbia (25)
- Slovakia (14)
- Slovenia (32)
- Spain (43)
- Sweden (34)
- Switzerland (46)
- Turkey (46)
- Ukraine (19)
