= 2024 World Athletics U20 Championships – Men's 10,000 metres walk =

Men's 10,000 metres walk at the 2024 World Athletics U20 Championships
- Venue: Estadio Atlético de la VIDENA
- Dates: 30 August 2024 (final)
- Competitors: 39 from 23 nations
- Winning time: 39:24.85

Medalists
gold medal	Rayen Cherni	Tunisia
silver medal	Emiliano Barba	Mexico
bronze medal	Giuseppe Disabato	Italy

The men's 10,000 metres race walk at the 2024 World Athletics U20 Championships was held at the Estadio Atlético de la VIDENA in Lima, Peru on 30 August 2024.

== Records ==
U20 standing records prior to the 2024 World Athletics U20 Championships were as follows:

Record	Athlete & Nationality	Mark	Location	Date
World U20 Record	Viktor Burayev (RUS)	38:46.4	Moscow, Russia	20 May 2000
Championship Record	Daisuke Matsunaga (JPN)	39:27.19	Eugene, United States	25 July 2014
World U20 Leading	Sohtaroh Osaka (JPN)	40:42.09	Kitami, Japan	6 July 2024

== Results ==
Key:	~ Red card for loss of contact	> Red card for bent knee	PZ60: 60sec Penalty Zone	TR54.7.5: Disqualified by Rule TR54.7.5 (4 red cards)

Rank	Athlete	Nation	Time	Notes
1st place, gold medalist(s)	Rayen Cherni	Tunisia	39:24.85	CR ~
2nd place, silver medalist(s)	Emiliano Barba	Mexico	39:27.10	AU20R ~
3rd place, bronze medalist(s)	Giuseppe Disabato	Italy	39:31.25	NU20R ~
4	Isaac Beacroft	Australia	39:36.39	AU20R
5	Sohtaroh Osaka	Japan	39:39.36	PB
6	Song Zhaohe	China	39:41.01	NU20R
7	Wang Jiaqi	China	40:14.62	PB
8	Taisei Yoshizako	Japan	40:14.67	PB ~
9	Stephen Kihu	Kenya	40:37.54	NU20R ~
10	Quentin Chenuet	France	40:39.14	NU20R
11	Frederick Weigel	Germany	40:52.97	PB
12	Jesús Ramírez	Colombia	40:55.25	PB ~ ~
13	Marcus Wakim	Australia	41:03.05	PB
14	Uziel Col Caal	Guatemala	41:35.02	PB ~
15	Alessio Coppola	Italy	41:36.11	PB
16	Daniel Monfort	Spain	41:46.30	PB
17	Yasser Redaouia	Algeria	41:52.71	PB
18	Nick Richardt	Germany	41:58.01	PB
19	Bastien Picart	France	42:00.90	
20	Himanshu	India	42:01.30	
21	Roman Horbachov	Ukraine	42:27.80	PB
22	Eduard Muravskyi	Ukraine	42:34.99	PB
23	Chen Yu-hsien	Chinese Taipei	42:37.45	NU20R
24	Sachin	India	42:37.68	
25	Oscar Bocanegra	Mexico	42:38.01	
26	Filip Krestianko	Slovakia	42:42.15	PB >
27	Julián Alfonso	Colombia	43:02.39	PB ~
28	Jhoshua Monterroso Ortíz	Guatemala	43:34.61	PB
29	Seo Beom-su	South Korea	43:37.02	PB
30	Jakub Bátovský	Slovakia	43:38.22	PB > >
31	Jonah Cropp	New Zealand	43:58.44	
32	Wassim Ounalli	Tunisia	44:12.72	PB
33	Alex Sánchez	Ecuador	44:15.29	
34	Ivan Oña	Ecuador	44:23.77	
35	Eduardo Camarate	Portugal	44:34.70	
36	Ayoub Ghazrani	Morocco	44:45.24	
37	Daniel Morilla	Spain	45:10.98	
38	José Ccoscco	Peru	47:52.81	
–	Anes Chaouati	Algeria	DQ	TR54.7.5
