= Elijah Pasquier =

French high jumper

Personal information
- Born: 29 June 2006 (age 20)

Sport
- Sport: Athletics
- Event: High jump
- Club: Stade sottevillais 76

Achievements and titles
- Personal bests: High jump: 2.25m (Tampere, 2025)
Medal record
Men's athletics
Representing France
European U20 Championships
Gold medal – first place	2025 Tampere	High jump
European Youth Olympic Festival
Gold medal – first place	2023 Maribor	High jump
Silver medal – second place	2022 Banská Bystrica	High jump

Elijah Pasquier (born 29 June 2006) is a French high jumper. He won the gold medal at the 2025 European Athletics U20 Championships.

== Career ==
He is from Evreux in Normandy. An old member of Évreux Athletics Club, he was coached by Victor Moussel and Romain Lecomte. Pasquier won the French U18 high jump title in 2022 with a jump of 2.05 metres, before being selected for the French team for his international debut; and winning a silver medal at the 2022 European Youth Summer Olympic Festival in Banská Bystrica, Slovakia, in July 2022.

He won gold in the high jump at the 2023 European Youth Summer Olympic Festival in Maribor, Slovenia, with a jump of 2.12 metres, 3 cm clear of the rest of the field.

Pasquier cleared a new lifetime best of 2.21m in July 2025 in Thonon-les-Bains. The following month, whilst competing in the high jump at the 2025 European Athletics U20 Championships in Tampere, he won the gold medal with a new lifetime best and French under-20 national best clearance of 2.25 metres to win ahead of Otis Poole of Great Britain. In September 2025, he was nominated for the European Athletics male rising star award.
