= Ona Bonet =

Spanish high jumper

Personal information
- Full name: Ona Bonet Bernadich
- Born: 29 March 2006 (age 20)

Sport
- Sport: Athletics
- Event: High jump

Achievements and titles
- Personal best: High jump 1.90 m (2025) NU20R
Medal record
Women's athletics
Representing Spain
European U20 Championships
Bronze medal – third place	2025 Tampere	High jump
Ibero-American U18 Championships
Gold medal – first place	2023 Lima	High jump

Ona Bonet Bernadich (born 29 March 2006) is a Spanish high jumper. She won the senior Spanish Indoor Athletics Championships title in 2025 and set a Spanish under-20 and Catalan record height that year.

== Career ==
She is from Manresa in Catalonia and her coaches include Gustavo Adolfo Becker. Bonet won the Ibero-American Under-18 Championship in Lima, Peru in September 2023. She jumped 1.86 metres in Sabadell in February 2024, a Spanish U20 indoor record, and went on to represent Spain at the 2024 World Athletics U20 Championships.

In February 2025, she won the Spanish Indoor Athletics Championships in Madrid with a jump of 1.84 metres at the age of 18 years-old. In May 2025, she equalled the Spanish under-20 record of Ruth Beitia set almost 27 years previously, of 1.89 metres.

She was selected for the 2025 European Athletics Team Championships in Madrid, in June 2025 and placed eighth overall with a best jump of 1.88 metres. At the Spanish U20 Championships in Villafranca in July 2025, Bonet cleared a Spanish U20 record of 1.90 metres. The mark also set a new Catalan record. In August 2025, she won a bronze medal at the 2025 European Athletics U20 Championships in Tampere, Finland with a 1.86 metres clearance to finish behind Ella Mikkola and Lilianna Bátori.
