= Andrea Tankeu =

Spanish athlete (born 2007)

Personal information
- Full name: Andrea Njimi Tankeu Djeudji
- Nationality: Spanish
- Born: 14 August 2007 (age 18)

Sport
- Sport: Athletics
- Event: Discus throw

Achievements and titles
- Personal best(s): Discus: 54.28 m (Tampere, 2025); Shot Put: 14.88m (Castellon, 2025)
Medal record
Women's athletics
Representing Spain
European U20 Championships
Gold medal – first place	2025 Tampere	Discus
European U18 Championships
Silver medal – second place	2024 Banská Bystrica	Discus
Ibero-American U18 Championships
Gold medal – first place	2023 Lima	Discus
Bronze medal – third place	2023 Lima	Shot

Andrea Njimi Tankeu Djeudji (born 14 August 2007) is a Spanish discus thrower and shot putter. She won the 2025 European Athletics U20 Championships and placed third at the Spanish Athletics Championships in the discus throw, as a 17 year-old, in 2025.

== Career ==
She is from Santander in Cantabria, and only started in Athletics at the age of 12 years-old, having also played handball she focused on athletics at secondary school, initially competing in combined events. In August 2020, in Los Corrales de Buelna, she broke the Spanish under-14 shot put record three times in a single day.

She won the Spanish U16 Indoor Athletics Championships in Sabadell in the weight throw with a throw of 14.16 metres in March 2022. After representing CA Olimpia-Lafuente she became a member of Piélagos Athletics Club, coached by Ramón Torralbo.

In July 2023, she became the Spanish U18 champion in both the shot put and discus throw. That year, she competed at the Ibero-American Athletics U18 Championships in Lima, Peru. She won the discus throw with a new Cantabria record of 47.19 metres, as well as winning the bronze medal in the shot put with a throw of 14.79 meters.

In January 2024, at the age of 16 years-old, she broke the Spanish U18 record in the 1 kg discus throw with a distance of 51.15 metres. She won the silver medal in the discus throw at the 2024 European Athletics U18 Championships in Banská Bystrica, Slovakia.

She placed third at the age of 17 years-old at the senior Spanish Athletics Championships in Tarragona, throwing a personal best of 53.77 metres to finish behind Naomey Ezenwa and Inés López. The following week, she won the gold medal in the discus throw at the 2025 European Athletics U20 Championships in Tampere, Finland, with a personal best of 54.28 metres to finish ahead of the defending champion, Germany's Curly Brown. She improved her personal best by over two and-a-half metres across the two events in a week.

== Personal life ==
She was named after her aunt (Njimi) and her paternal grandfather (André). She is of Cameroonian descent.
