= Jakub Rodziak =

Polish athlete (born 2007)

Personal information
- Nationality: Polish
- Born: 30 April 2007 (age 19)

Sport
- Country: Poland
- Sport: Athletics
- Events: Discus throw, Shot put
Medal record
Men's athletics
Representing Poland
European U20 Championships
Silver medal – second place	2025 Tampere	Shot put
Bronze medal – third place	2025 Tampere	Shot put
European U18 Championships
Gold medal – first place	2024 Banska Bystrica	Discus

Jakub Rodziak (born 30 April 2007) is a Polish discus thrower and shot putter.

== Biography ==
From Chromiec, Rodziak is the youngest of three brothers who all compete in throwing events, including Polish champion Damian. He is a member of LUKS Orkan Września, where he works with his coach Przemysław Pawlak.

Rodziak won the gold medal at the 2024 European Athletics U18 Championships in Banská Bystrica, Slovakia, making a world under-18 leading throw in the discus of 64.21 metres. He was also a finalist in the shot put competition at the championships.

Rodziak was a two-time medalist at the 2025 European Athletics U20 Championships in Tampere, Finland, winning the silver medal in the discus throw with a personal best of 62.90 metres, and the bronze medal in the shot put final, having set new personal bests in both the qualifying rounds and the final.

In February 2026, he set a new lifetime best in winning the Polish national indoor under-20 title in the shot put. His distance of 18.76 meters improved his personal best by six centimetres from the previous year. In June, he won both shot put and discus throw titles at the Polish U20 Championships. Representing Poland in August, he threw 61.58 m to automatically qualify for the final of the discus throw at the 2026 World Athletics U20 Championships in Eugene, USA.
