= Ibero-American U18 Championships in Athletics =

Ibero-American U18 Championships in Athletics (Spanish: Campeonato Iberoamericano U18 de Atletismo) is biennial athletics competition organised by Asociación Iberoamericana de Atletismo for athletes under the age of 18. The event debuted in 2023 in Lima, Peru.

== Summary of championships ==
	Year	City	Country	Date	Venue	Events	Countries
1	2023	Lima	Peru	15–17 September	VIDENA	43	12
2	2025	Asunción	Paraguay	19–20 July	Parque Olímpico Pista de Atletismo	41	16
3	2027	La Nucía	Spain	24–25 July	Estadi Olímpic Camilo Cano		

== Medal table (2023–2025) ==
Rank	Nation	Gold	Silver	Bronze	Total
1	Brazil	23	19	10	52
2	Spain	19	12	9	40
3	Colombia	12	10	6	28
4	Ecuador	10	9	12	31
5	Mexico	6	8	13	27
6	Argentina	4	9	12	25
7	Peru	4	2	7	13
8	Chile	3	9	6	18
9	Venezuela	3	2	4	9
10	Uruguay	0	2	2	4
11	Costa Rica	0	1	1	2
12	Dominican Republic	0	1	0	1
13	El Salvador	0	0	1	1
13	Paraguay	0	0	1	1
Totals (14 entries)		84	84	84	252

== Championships records ==
=== Boys ===
Event	Record	Athlete	Nationality	Date	Meet	Place	Ref.
100 m	10.50 (−0.1 m/s)	Mariano Fiol	Peru	19 July 2025	2025 Championships	Asunción, Paraguay	
200 m	21.18 (+2.0 m/s)	Mariano Fiol	Peru	20 July 2025	2025 Championships	Asunción, Paraguay	
400 m	47.41	Agustín Coronel	Argentina	16 September 2023	2023 Championships	Lima, Peru	
800 m	1:50.11	Giancarlo Bravo	Peru	20 July 2025	2025 Championships	Asunción, Paraguay	
1500 m	3:55.37	Sergio Granado	Spain	19 July 2025	2025 Championships	Asunción, Paraguay	
3000 m	8:34.83	Jessiel Páez	Ecuador	16 September 2023	2023 Championships	Lima, Peru	
110 m hurdles (91.4 cm)	13.65 (−0.2 m/s)	Vinícius de Brito	Brazil	16 September 2023	2023 Championships	Lima, Peru	
400 m hurdles (84.0 cm)	51.47	Stiven Méndez	Ecuador	20 July 2025	2025 Championships	Asunción, Paraguay	
2000 m steeplechase (84.0 cm)	5:58.34	Biel Vivacqua	Spain	19 July 2025	2025 Championships	Asunción, Paraguay	
High jump	2.02 m	Fred de Araújo	Brazil	15 September 2023	2023 Championships	Lima, Peru	
Pole vault	5.10 m	Ricardo Montes de Oca	Venezuela	15 September 2023	2023 Championships	Lima, Peru	
Long jump	7.18 m (+0.1 m/s)	Murilo Silva	Brazil	16 September 2023	2023 Championships	Lima, Peru	
Triple jump	15.30 m (±0.0 m/s)	Guilherme da Silva	Brazil	20 July 2025	2025 Championships	Asunción, Paraguay	
Shot put (5 kg)	18.89 m A AR-y	Alessandro Soares	Brazil	15 September 2023	2023 Championships	Lima, Peru	
Discus throw (1.5 kg)	58.67 m	Alberto dos Santos Filho	Brazil	16 September 2023	2023 Championships	Lima, Peru	
Hammer throw (5 kg)	72.47 m	Patry Váldez	Ecuador	20 July 2025	2025 Championships	Asunción, Paraguay	
Javelin throw (700 g)	75.53 m	Pietro Silva	Brazil	19 July 2025	2025 Championships	Asunción, Paraguay	
Decathlon (U18)	7646 pts A	Paulo Henrique Krul	Brazil	19–20 July 2025	2025 Championships	Asunción, Paraguay	
Decathlon (U18)	100m / Long jump / Shot put / High jump / 400m / 110m H / Discus / Pole vault / Javelin / 1500m; 11.06 (+0.6 m/s) / 6.74 m (±0.0 m/s) / 15.00 m / 2.05 m / 53.45 / 14.65 NWI / 49.78 m / 4.40 m / 52.78 m / 4:49.06						
10,000 m walk (track)	43:10.3	Emiliano Barba	Mexico	15 September 2023	2023 Championships	Lima, Peru	
4 × 100 m relay	42.04	Dylan Ocoro; Yeison González; Sebastián Palomeque; Deiner Guaitoto	Colombia	17 September 2023	2023 Championships	Lima, Peru	
4 × 400 m relay	3:17.03	Vinicius de Brito; SVinícius Costa; Victor dos Santos; Carlos Domingos	Brazil	17 September 2023	2023 Championships	Lima, Peru	

Key:
^{WR-y} World youth record	^{AR-y} South American youth record	^{NR-y} National youth record	^{A} affected by altitude

=== Girls ===
Event	Record	Athlete	Nationality	Date	Meet	Place	Ref.
100 m	11.53 (+0.9 m/s)	Hakelly de Souza	Brazil	19 July 2025	2025 Championships	Asunción, Paraguay	
200 m	23.66 (±0.0 m/s)	Hakelly de Souza	Brazil	20 July 2025	2025 Championships	Asunción, Paraguay	
400 m	54.43	Kenya Maturana	Mexico	19 July 2025	2025 Championships	Asunción, Paraguay	
800 m	2:08.20	Marta Mitjans	Spain	17 September 2023	2023 Championships	Lima, Peru	
1500 m	4:28.10	Valentina Cancino	Chile	19 July 2025	2025 Championships	Asunción, Paraguay	
3000 m	9:39.61	Irene Pernia	Argentina	20 July 2025	2025 Championships	Asunción, Paraguay	
100 m hurdles (76.2 cm)	13.55 (+0.8 m/s)	Beatriz Monteiro	Brazil	19 July 2025	2025 Championships	Asunción, Paraguay	
400 m hurdles (84.0 cm)	60.00	Amanda da Silva	Brazil	15 September 2023	2023 Championships	Lima, Peru	
2000 m steeplechase (84.0 cm)	6:45.93	Demeku Paniagua	Spain	19 July 2025	2025 Championships	Asunción, Paraguay	
High jump	1.78 m	Ona Bonet	Spain	16 September 2023	2023 Championships	Lima, Peru	
High jump	1.78 m	Jeraldine Pata	Ecuador	20 July 2025	2025 Championships	Asunción, Paraguay	
Pole vault	3.85 m	Alba Benito	Spain	20 July 2025	2025 Championships	Asunción, Paraguay	
Long jump	6.22 m (+0.5 m/s)	Gift Isaac	Spain	19 July 2025	2025 Championships	Asunción, Paraguay	
Triple jump	13.25 m (+0.4 m/s)	Gift Isaac	Spain	20 July 2025	2025 Championships	Asunción, Paraguay	
Shot put (3 kg)	15.96 m	Belsy Quiñónez	Ecuador	15 September 2023	2023 Championships	Lima, Peru	
Discus throw	47.19 m	Andrea Tankeu	Spain	16 September 2023	2023 Championships	Lima, Peru	
Hammer throw (3 kg)	65.57 m	Andrea Sales	Spain	15 September 2023	2023 Championships	Lima, Peru	
Javelin throw (500 g)	48.80 m	Ilsa Córdoba	Colombia	19 July 2025	2025 Championships	Asunción, Paraguay	
Heptathlon (U18)	4957 pts	Yudisa Martínez	Colombia	16–17 September 2023	2023 Championships	Asunción, Paraguay	
Heptathlon (U18)	100m H / High jump / Shot put / 200m / Long jump / Javelin / 800m; 14.67 (+0.9 m/s) / 1.61 m / 12.45 m / 26.12 (+0.3 m/s) / 5.31 m (+1.2 m/s) / 41.30 m / 2:45.72						
10,000 m walk (track)	23:21.0h	Karen Litardo	Ecuador	16 September 2023	2023 Championships	Lima, Peru	
4 × 100 m relay	46.43	Maite Hernández; Pilar Rodríguez; María Paz Barrera; Roxana Ramírez	Chile	19 July 2025	2025 Championships	Asunción, Paraguay	
4 × 400 m relay	3:49.84	Beatriz Monteiro; Maria Eduarda de Oliveira; Pietra Simões; Amanda da Silva	Brazil	17 September 2023	2023 Championships	Lima, Peru	

Key:
^{WR-y} World youth record	^{AR-y} South American youth record	^{NR-y} National youth record	^{A} affected by altitude

=== Mixed ===
Event	Record	Athlete	Nationality	Date	Meet	Place	Ref.
4 × 400 m relay	3:29.99	José Miguel Valencia; Emily Román; Marlon Acevedo; Sara Cuesta	Colombia	19 July 2025	2025 Championships	Asunción, Paraguay	
