= Tom Waterworth =

British middle-distance runner (born 2007)

Personal information
- Born: 21 July 2007 (age 18)

Sport
- Sport: Athletics
- Event: Middle-distance running
- Club: Huntingdonshire Athletics Club

Achievements and titles
- Personal best(s): 400m: 48.54 (London, 2025); 800m: 1:46.73 (Watford, 2025); 1500m: 3:55.54 (Watford, 2024)
Medal record
Men's athletics
Representing Great Britain
European U20 Championships
Silver medal – second place	2025 Tampere	800 m

Tom Waterworth (born 21 July 2007) is a British middle-distance runner. He won the silver medal at the 2025 European Athletics U20 Championships over 800 metres.

== Career ==
Waterworth is from Colne, Cambridgeshire and a member of Huntingdonshire Athletics Club, having joined the club at nine years-old. He is coached by Derek Darnell. In 2023, he won the 800 metres and was part of the winning 4 x 400 metres relay at the School International Athletics Board Track and Field Meet in Grangemouth, Scotland. He placed fifth the following year at the 2024 European Athletics U18 Championships over 800 metres.

In February 2025, Waterworth competed at the Senior British Indoor Athletics Championships in Birmingham, where he ran an indoors personal best of 1:50.64, placing third in his heat. In May, in his 2025 outdoor opening rave at the Watford BMC, Waterworth ran a new personal best of 1:48.16. The following month, again in Watford, he lowered his personal best to 1:46.73.

Waterworth was named in the British team for the 800 metres at the 2025 European Athletics U20 Championships in Tampere, Finland, winning his heat in a championship record 1:47.83. In the final of the 800 metres, he was part of a British 1-2-3 across the line alongside Rafferty Mirfin and William Rabjohns, although Ranjohns was later disqualified following an appeal by the Spanish federation despite being the first finisher, with Mirfin awarded victory and Waterworth moved up to silver, with Aaron Ceballos of Spain winning the bronze. He was named British under-20 male athlete of the year by Athletics Weekly for 2025.

== Personal life ==
The son of James and Rachel, his younger sister Jessica also competes for Huntingdonshire Athletics Club. He attends Loughborough University.
