= Ander Garaiar =

Spanish sprinter (born 2007)

Personal information
- Born: 17 May 2007 (age 19)

Sport
- Sport: Athletics
- Event: Sprint

Achievements and titles
- Personal bests: 60m: 6.73 (2026); 100m: 10.28 (2025); 200m: 20.74 (2025) NU20R
Medal record
Men's athletics
Representing Spain
European U20 Championships
Gold medal – first place	2025 Tampere	100 m

Ander Garaiar (born 17 May 2007) is a Spanish sprinter. He became the European under-20 champion over 100 metres in 2025 and is the Basque record holder over 100 and 200 metres.

== Biography ==
He was born in Oiartzun in the province of Gipuzkoa. He would train as a youngster on the bike lanes around the Peñas de Aya along The Arditurri greenway. He was later coached by Valentín Rocandio.

On his eighteenth birthday in May 2025 he improved his personal best time in the 200 metres by more than a second, and set a new Basque Under-20 record of 21.22 seconds. Later that month he broke the Spanish U-20 records in the 100 and 200 metres in the same week, running 20.74 for the 200m to better Daniel González mark of 20.78 seconds from 2023 and 10.29 seconds in the 100 metres to improve Sergio López Barranco's record from 2018. Both times were also absolute Basque records. He was then a member of the Spanish men’s 4 x 100 metres relay team that set a new national under-20 record in Salamanca (39.27), for his third national record in twelves days. He later posted a new 100 metres personal best of 10.28 seconds (-0.2) in winning the Spanish under-20 title in July 2025.

He won the 100 metres at the 2025 European Athletics U20 Championships in Tampere, winning in 10.40 (-0.7 m/s) to finish ahead of Dutchman Jozuah Revierre and Great Britain's Teddy Wilson who could not be separated in second. His win as an eighteen year-old was the first gold medal for Spain in the 100 metres dash at a continental championship.

Garaiar ran 6.73 seconds for the 60 metres in San Sebastián in January 2026. He was selected as part of the Spain team for the 2026 World Athletics Relays in Gaborone, Botswana.
