= Jozuah Revierre =

Dutch athlete (born 2006)

Personal information
- Nationality: British
- Born: 20 April 2006 (age 20)

Sport
- Sport: Athletics
- Event: Sprinter

Achievements and titles
- Personal bests: 60m 6.80 (Apeldoorn, 2025); 100m 10.35 (Kortrijk, 2025) NU20R; 200m 20.89 (Kortrijk, 2025)
Medal record
Men's athletics
Representing Netherlands
European U20 Championships
Silver medal – second place	2025 Tampere	100 m
European U20 Championships
Silver medal – second place	2023 Jerusalem	4x100m relay

Jozuah Revierre (born 20 April 2006) is a Dutch sprinter. He became the Dutch under-20 national record holder for the 100 metres in 2025, and was a silver medalist over 100 metres at the 2025 European Athletics U20 Championships.

== Biography ==
He is from Rotterdam. He was a silver medalist with the Dutch 4 x 100 metres relay team at the 2023 European Athletics U20 Championships in Jerusalem, Israel.

In February 2025, he set a personal best for the 60 metres in Apeldoorn, running a time of 6.80 seconds to move to fourth on the Dutch all-time national under-20 list. That month, he won the Dutch national under-20 indoor title at the same venue, running a time of 6.81 seconds.

At the Dutch outdoor national under-20 championships in June 2025 he completed a sprint double, securing victory in the 100 metres and 200 meters, running season-best times twice in the sprints; with 10.51 seconds and 21.24 seconds, respectively. He set a new Dutch national under-20 record in the 100 metres with a time of 10.35 seconds (+0.9 m/s) in Kortrijk, Belgium, in July 2025. That month, he ran as part of the Dutch 4 x 100 metres relay team which placed third behind Jamaica and Great Britain teams at the 2025 London Athletics Meet, alongside Taymir Burnet, Xavi Mo-Ajok, and Elvis Afrifa.

Competing at the 2025 European Athletics U20 Championships in Tampere, Finland, he shared the silver medal in the final of the 100 metres with British sprinter Teddy Wilson, with both men unable to separated in 10.47 seconds (-0.7), behind gold medal-winning Spaniard Ander Garaiar.

In August 2026, he ran as part of the Dutch men's 4 x 100 metres relay team at the 2026 European Athletics Championships in Birmingham, England as the Netherlands came through their heat to qualify for the final, before placing fourth overall.
