= Eduardo Longobardi =

Italian sprinter (born 2005)

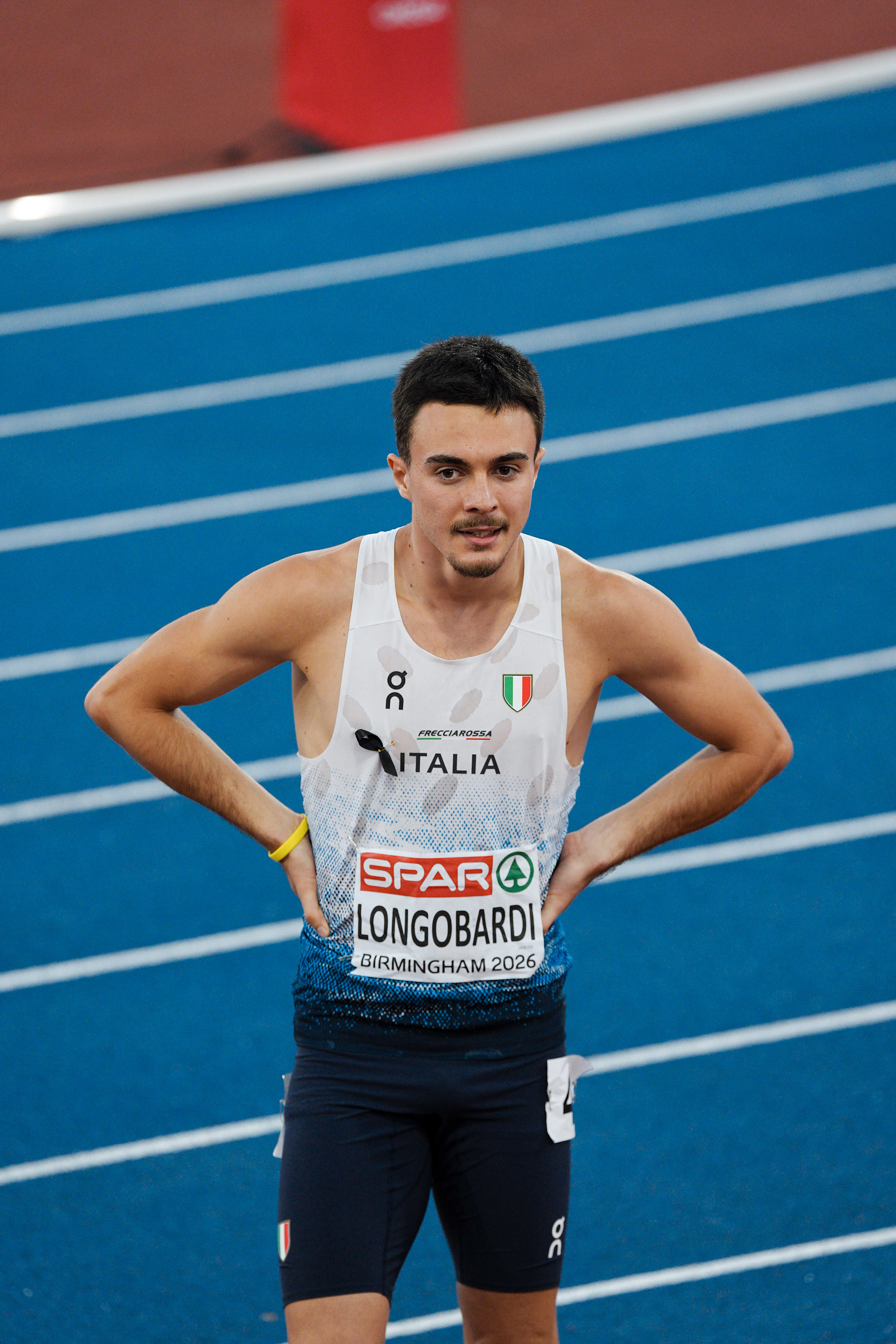
- Competing at the 2026 European Championships

Personal information
- National team: Italy
- Born: 19 October 2005 (age 20)

Sport
- Sport: Athletics
- Event: Sprint
- Club: Fiamme Gialle
Medal record
Men's athletics
Representing Italy
European U18 Championships
Gold medal – first place	2022 Jerusalem	Medley relay
Silver medal – second place	2022 Jerusalem	200 m

Eduardo Longobardi (born 19 October 2005) is an Italian sprinter. He represented Italy at the 2026 European Athletics Championships.

== Biography ==
From Naples, he trained as a member of Fiamme Gialle Simoni in Rome. In June 2022, as a 16 year-old, he won the Italian U18 title over 100 metres in Milan, his time of 10.47 seconds to move to second on the Italian U18 list behind Filippo Tortu. Longobardi subsequently won the silver medal the following month in the 200 metres at the 2022 European Athletics U18 Championships. He also won the gold medal in the sprint medley relay in Jerusalem, Israel. He placed fourth with the Italian men's 4 x 100 metres relay team at the 2022 World Athletics U20 Championships in Cali, Colombia. In July 2023, he won the Italian U20 championship title over 200 metres and retained the title the following year in 20.53 seconds.

In August 2025, he placed fourth in the final of the 200 metres at the Italian Athletics Championships. In May 2026, he ran for Italy at the 2026 World Athletics Relays in the men's 4 × 100 metres relay in Gaborone, Botswana. At the 2026 European Athletics Championships, Longobardi ran a personal best of 20.42 seconds in the semi-finals of the 200 metres. He also ran as part of the Italy men's 4 x 100 metres relay team at the championships as Italy won their heat to qualify for the final.
