= 2026 African Championships in Athletics – Men's high jump =

Men's high jump at the 2026 African Championships in Athletics
- Venue: Legon Sports Stadium
- Location: Accra, Ghana
- Dates: 17 May
- Competitors: 11 from 8 nations
- Winning time: 2.22

Medalists
gold medal	Younes Ayachi	Algeria
silver medal	Matao le Roux	South Africa
bronze medal	Kemboi Asbel Kiprop	Kenya

The men's high jump event at the 2026 African Championships in Athletics was held on 17 May in Accra, Ghana.

== Results ==
Rank	Athlete	Nation	Result	Remark
1st place, gold medalist(s)	Younes Ayachi	Algeria	2.22	
2nd place, silver medalist(s)	Matao le Roux	South Africa	2.16	PB
3rd place, bronze medalist(s)	Kemboi Asbel Kiprop	Kenya	2.13	
4	Steve Junior Zo'o	Cameroon	2.13	
5	Taolo Lesole	Botswana	2.13	
6	Kelvin Adu	Ghana	2.10	
7	Tshwanelo Aabobe	Botswana	2.10	
8	Dezardin Prosper	Mauritius	2.05	
9	Fredy Kevin Oyono	Cameroon	2.00	
10	Gemeda Abata	Ethiopia	2.00	
11	Francis Annin	Ghana	1.95	
	Abdoul Mmadi	Comoros	DNS	
