= Judith Mokobe =

German sprinter (born 2006)

Personal information
- Full name: Judith Bilepo Mokobe
- Born: 6 October 2006 (age 19)

Sport
- Sport: Athletics
- Event: Sprint

Achievements and titles
- Personal bests: 60 m: 7.61 (2025); 100 m: 11.44 (2025); 200 m: 23.11 (2025)
Medal record
Women's athletics
Representing Germany
European U20 Championships
Gold medal – first place	2025 Tampere	200 m

Judith Bilepo Mokobe (born 6 October 2006) is a German sprinter. She won the 2025 European Athletics U20 Championships title over 200 metres at the age of 18 years-old.

== Biography ==
From Mainz, she trains as a member of USC Mainz, although she came to athletics relatively late, only starting in 2022. She won the 60 metres title at the U18 Rhineland-Palatinate Championship in January 2023. She went on to became the German youth champion in July 2023 in Rostock over 200 metres.

She set a personal best for the 200 metres of 23.64 seconds in placing third at the 2024 German U23 Championships in Mönchengladbach as a 17 year-old. She was a semi-finalist in the 200 metres at the 2024 World Athletics U20 Championships in Lima, Peru.

She competed at the Kurpfalz Gala in Weinheim for USC Mainz and set a personal best of 23.11 seconds for the 200 metres in May 2025. The time also improved the Rhineland-Palatinate record for U20 runners, which had been held by Andreas Bersch since 1982. It was also the fastest U20 time by a German runner since Gina Lückenkemper.

She ran 23.87 seconds to qualify for the semi-finals at the 2025 European Athletics U20 Championships in Tampere, Finland, before reaching the final with a personal-best-equalling run of 23.11 in her semi-final (-1.8). She then proceeded to win the gold medal in the final, running 23.40 seconds into a headwind (-2.0). In winning the title at the age of 18 years-old, she became the first German woman to win the title since Gina Lückenkemper in 2015.

In August 2026, she competed at the 2026 European Athletics Championships in Birmingham, England, in the women's 200 metres, reaching the semi-finals.
