= Samuel James (high jumper) =

British high jumper (born 2009)

Personal information
- Born: 9 August 2009 (age 17)

Sport
- Sport: Athletics
- Event: High jump
- Club: Kingston AC and Polytechnic Harriers
- Coached by: James Wild

Achievements and titles
- Personal best: 2.25m
Medal record
Men's athletics
Representing Great Britain
European U18 Championships
Gold medal – first place	2026 Rieti	High jump

Samuel James (born 9 August 2009) is a British high jumper. In 2026, he equalled the British under-18 best clearance with 2.25 metres as he won the gold medal at the 2026 European Athletics U18 Championships.

== Biography ==
A member of Kingston AC and Poly Harriers and coached by James Wild, James won the gold medal at the 2026 European Athletics U18 Championships with a championship record of 2.25 metres, a clearance that equalled the British under-18 age-group best recorded by Steve Smith in 1997. On his way to victory he set new personal bests at 2.15m, 2.18m, 2.21m and 2.23m, with a 2.18m clearance initially setting a championship record. No under-18 athlete had jumped higher since 2019 and the clearances moved James to thirteenth on the world under-18 all-time list.

James was subsequently added to the Great Britain team for the 2026 World Athletics U20 Championships, placing fifth overall with a clearance of 2.17 metres in the final, on the eve of his seventeenth birthday, as teammate Otis Poole won the bronze medal. He was nominated for European Athletics Men’s Rising Star for 2026. In October 2026, he was selected for the 2026/27 Olympic Futures Programme awarded by UK Athletics. The following month, he was nominated for British U20 Male Athlete of the Year by Athletics Weekly.
