= Younes Ayachi =

Algerian high jumper (born 2008)

Personal information
- Born: 12 April 2008 (age 18)

Sport
- Sport: Athletics
- Event: High jump

Achievements and titles
- Personal bests: High jump: 2:28m (Weinheim, 2026)
Medal record
Men's athletics
Representing Algeria
African Championships
Gold medal – first place	2026 Accea	High jump
World U20 Championships
Gold medal – first place	2026 Eugene	High jump

Younes Ayachi (born 12 April 2008) is an Algerian high jumper. He won gold medals at the 2026 African Championships and 2026 World U20 Championships, and placed ninth at the 2026 World Indoor Championships.

In 2026 as a 17-year-old, he set the Algerian under-20 national record.

== Biography ==
Coached by Hocine Boukendoul he is a member of RB Souk El-Tenine. In May 2024, Ayachi placed second to compatriot Abderrahmane Dejaber at the Arab U20 Athletics Championships in Ismailia, Egypt. Ayachi won the Arab Junior Athletics Championships in Al Taif, Saudi Arabia, in September 2024, with a jump of 2.11 metres. Ayachi jumped a personal best of 2.18 metres as a 16-year-old in February 2025.

Competing as a 17-year-old, Ayachi set a personal best at the Elmos International Indoor Meeting in Belgium on 31 January 2026, with a jump of 2.26 meters, setting a new Algerian under-20 national record. The following week, Ayachi won the high jump at the Hochsprung International Indoor Meeting in Germany, with a jump of 2.28 meters, improving his own Algerian under-20 national record.

In March 2026, he was selected for the 2026 World Athletics Indoor Championships in Poland, placing ninth overall. in May, he won the gold medal at the 2026 African Championships in Athletics in Accra, Ghana, where he made a clearance of 2.22 metres. In August, he won the gold medal at the 2026 World Athletics U20 Championships, having jumped 2.21m.
