= Joan Querol =

Spanish athlete (born 2006)

Personal information
- Full name: Joan Querol Serrano
- Nationality: Spanish
- Born: 7 December 2006 (age 19) Valencia, Spain

Sport
- Country: Spain
- Sport: Athletics
- Event: Race Walking
Medal record
Men's athletics
Representing Spain
European U20 Championships
Gold medal – first place	2025 Tampere	10,000 m walk

Joan Querol Serrano (born 7 December 2006) is a Spanish race walker. He won the 2025 European Athletics U20 Championships over 10,000 metres.

== Career ==
He is from Valencia, and is coached in race walking by his father. He finished in second place in the men’s U20 10 km race walk event at the 2025 European Race Walking Championships in Podebrady, Czech Republic in May 2025.

He set a Spanish under-20 national record for the 10,000 metres race walk in winning the gold medal at the 2025 European Athletics U20 Championships in Tampere, Finland. His time of 39:10.04 also set a new championship record for the event. In September 2025, he was nominated for the European Athletics male rising star award.
