= Mabel Akande =

British athlete (born 2006)

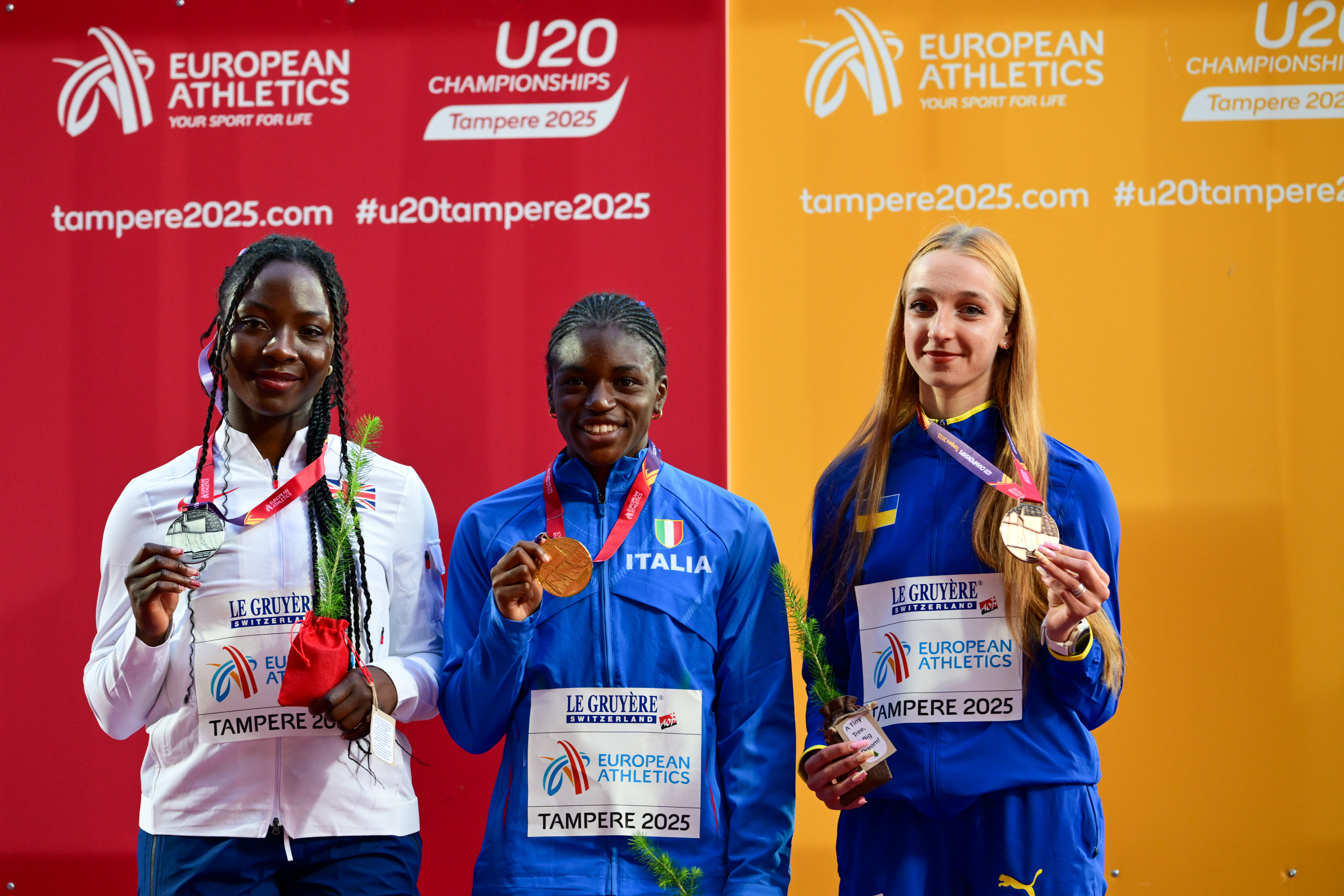
- Akande in 2025

Personal information
- Full name: Mabel Oluwayemisi Akande
- Nationality: British
- Born: 5 September 2006 (age 20) Lincoln, England

Sport
- Sport: Athletics
- Event: Sprint

Achievements and titles
- Personal bests: 60 m: 7.24 s (Sheffield, 2026); 100 m: 11.18 s (Birmingham, 2026)
Medal record
Women's athletics
Representing Great Britain
European U20 Championships
Silver medal – second place	2025 Tampere	100 m
Silver medal – second place	2025 Tampere	4x100 m relay
Representing England
Commonwealth Youth Games
Silver medal – second place	2023 Trinbago	4x100 m mixed relay

Mabel Oluwayemisi Akande (born 5 September 2006) is a British sprinter. She came third at the 2024 British Indoor Athletics Championships in the 60 metres. She was a silver medalist at the 2025 European Athletics U20 Championships over 100 metres.

== Biography ==
From Lincolnshire, Akande is of Nigerian descent. She is a member of Lincoln Wellington Athletic Club. In 2023, she was selected for the 2023 Commonwealth Youth Games held in Trinidad and Tobago where she won a silver medal as part of the English 4 × 100 m relay team.

In February 2024, she became national under-20 champion and set a new personal best for the 60 metres, with a time of 7.26 seconds. That month, and still aged 17 years-old, she came third at the senior British Indoor Athletics Championships in the 60 metres, running 7.32 in the final in Birmingham.

In May 2024, she won the 100 metres at the Loughborough International in a personal best time of 11.52 seconds. She ran 11.53 seconds in the semi-finals of the 100 m at the British Athletics Championships in Manchester on 29 June 2024. She was selected for the 2024 World Athletics U20 Championships in Lima, Peru.

She finished runner-up to Amy Hunt over 60 metres at the Keely Klassic on 15 February 2025, in a time of 7.28 seconds. In July 2025, she won the title over 100 metres at the England U20 Championships in Birmingham with a wind-assisted time of 11.30 seconds (+3.3) after a wind-legal 11.36 in the semifinal. She was named in the British team for the 100 metres at the 2025 European Athletics U20 Championships in Tampere, Finland, winning her 100 metres semi final in 11.48 (-0.2 m/s) before winning the silver medal in the final behind Kelly Doualla of Italy, with 11.41 (-0.1). She also anchored the British women's 4x100m relay team to the silver medal running alongside Nell Desir, Kaya Slater and Lucy Tallon to finish in 43.98 seconds. In October 2025, she was named on the British Athletics Olympic Futures Programme for 2025/26.

In February 2026, Akande finished runner-up to Ewa Swoboda over 60 metres at the Sparkassen Indoor Meeting Dortmund, a World Athletics Indoor Tour Bronze meeting, running 7.25 seconds. The following week, Akande qualified for the final of the 60 metres at the 2026 British Indoor Athletics Championships in Birmingham, on 14 February 2026, winning her semi-final in 7.35 seconds, but was unable to compete in the final.

Akande was named in the British squad for the 4 x 100 metres relay at the 2026 World Athletics Relays in Gaborone, Botswana. On 20 June, Akande ran a personal best of 11.18 to place third in the 100 m final at the 2026 UK Athletics Championships. On 4 July, she won the 100 m final at the England Athletics Championships in 11.37 seconds. In July 2026, she competed in the 100 metres at the 2026 Commonwealth Games in Glasgow, Scotland, reaching the semi-finals. Later at the Games, she also competed in the women's 4 × 100 m relay. In October 2026, she was retained on the 2026/27 Olympic Futures Programme awarded by UK Athletics.

== Athletics achievements ==
=== International competitions ===
Representing Great Britain & England
Year	Competition	Venue	Position	Event	Notes
2023	Commonwealth Youth Games	Port of Spain, Trinidad and Tobago	6th	100 m	11.68
2023	Commonwealth Youth Games	Port of Spain, Trinidad and Tobago	2nd	4 x 100 m relay	42.68
2024	World U20 Championships	Lima, Peru	9th (sf)	100 m	11.59
2024	World U20 Championships	Lima, Peru	—	4 × 100 m relay	DQ
2025	European U20 Championships	Tampere, Finland	2nd	100 m	11.41
2025	European U20 Championships	Tampere, Finland	2nd	4 × 100 m relay	43.98
2026	Commonwealth Games	Glasgow, United Kingdom	13th (sf)	100 m	11.30
2026	Commonwealth Games	Glasgow, United Kingdom	5th	4 × 100 m relay	43.45

=== National championships and competitions ===
Year	Competition	Venue	Position	Event	Time
2022	England Championships, U17 events	Bedford	2nd	100 m	12.01
2023	England Indoor Championships, U17 events	Sheffield	1st	60 m	7.41
2023	England Championships, U20 events	Chelmsford	4th	100 m	11.69
2023	England Championships, U17 events	Birmingham	1st	100 m	11.77
2024	England Indoor Championships, U20 events	Sheffield	1st	60 m	7.26
2024	British Indoor Championships	Birmingham	3rd	60 m	7.32
2024	British Championships	Manchester	9th (sf)	100 m	11.53
2024	England Championships, U20 events	Birmingham	1st	100 m	11.69
2025	British Indoor Championships	Birmingham	7th	60 m	7.42
2025	England Championships, U20 events	Birmingham	1st	100 m	11.30
2026	British Indoor Championships	Birmingham	7th	60 m	7.47
2026	British Championships	Birmingham	3rd	100 m	11.18
2026	England Championships, Senior events	Bedford	1st	100 m	11.37
