= Under-18 athletics =

Sport age category

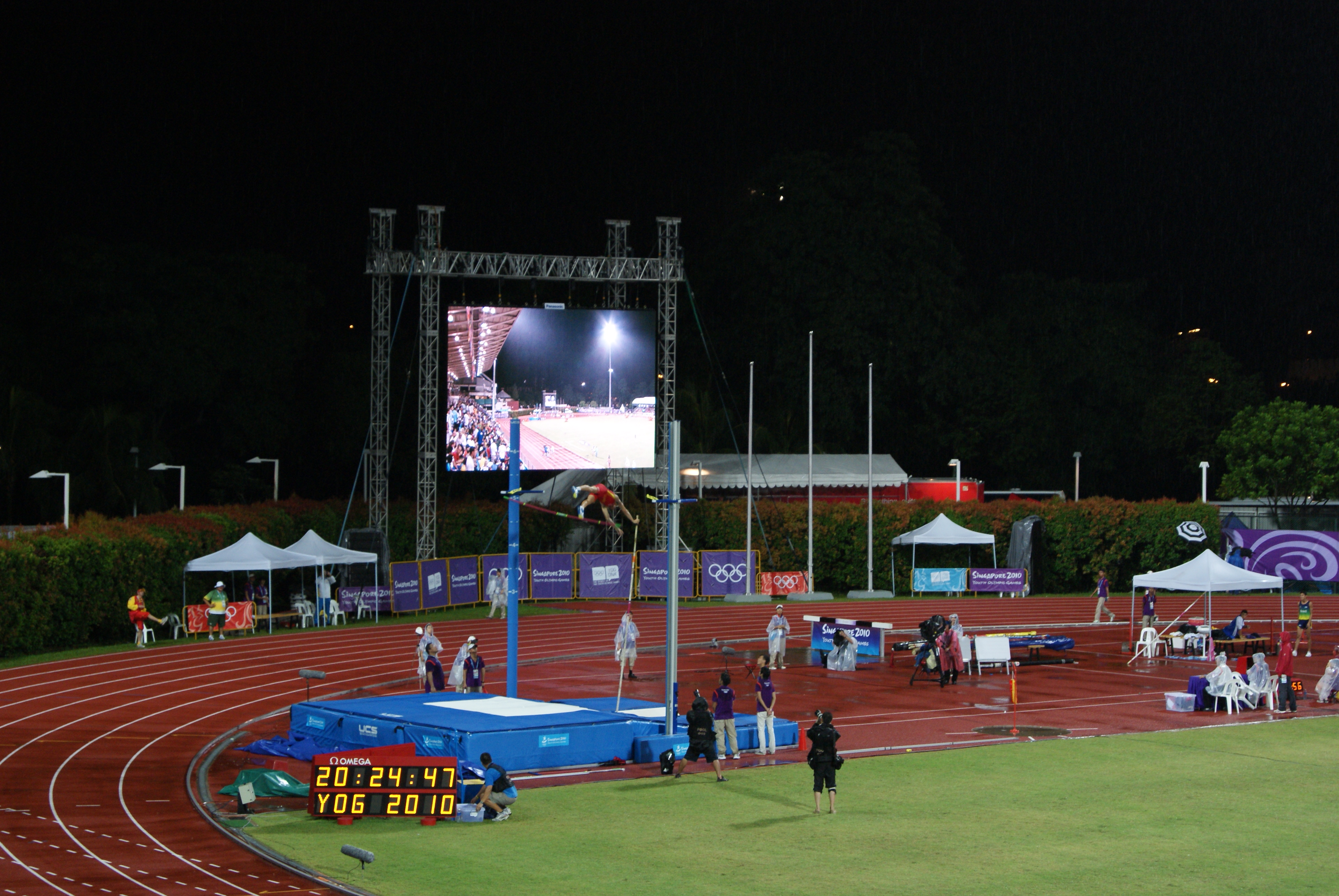
The boy's pole vault at the 2010 Summer Youth Olympics held in Singapore.

Youth is a category of athletics in which athletes compete under the age of 18 years. Countries all around the world compete in athletics. World Youth Athletics Competitions are held every 2 years which contain the best Youth competitors in the world.

== Description and development ==
The principle behind the category is to introduce young people into athletics. Participators in the competitions in this class may be athletes who have not completed their eighteenth year on 31 December of the year the competition occurs.

== Competitions ==
=== Championships ===
- IAAF World U18 Championships, organized by the IAAF every 2 years (discontinued)
- European Athletics U18 Championships, organized by the EAA every 2 years
- African Youth Athletics Championships
- Asian U18 Athletics Championships
- NACAC U18 Championships in Athletics
- Oceania U18 Athletics Championships, organized by the OAA every 2 years
- Ibero-American U18 Championships in Athletics
- Central American and Caribbean Youth Championships in Athletics (discontinued)
- Pan American Youth Athletics Championships (discontinued)

=== Games ===
- Youth Olympic Games
- European Youth Olympic Festival
- African Youth Games
- Asian Youth Games

== See also ==
- List of world youth bests in athletics
- International Association of Athletics Federations
- European Athletic Association
- Under-20 athletics
- Under-23 athletics
