= 2025 European Athletics U20 Championships =

Sports competition in Tampere, Finland

- Organisers: European Athletics
- Edition: 28th
- Dates: 7–10 August
- Host city: Tampere
- Venue: Tampere Stadium
- Level: Under 20
- Type: Outdoor
- Events: 44
- Participation: 1295 athletes from 48 nations
- Official website: European Athletics

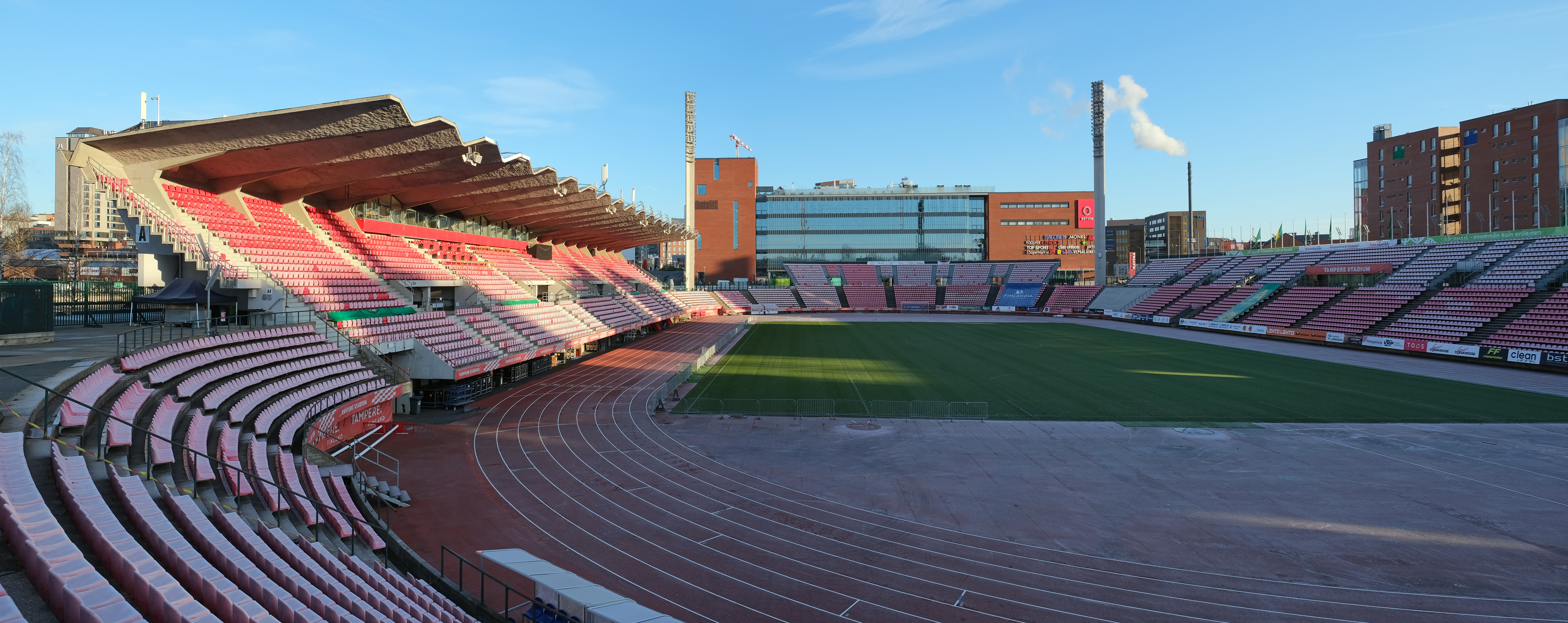
Tampere Stadium

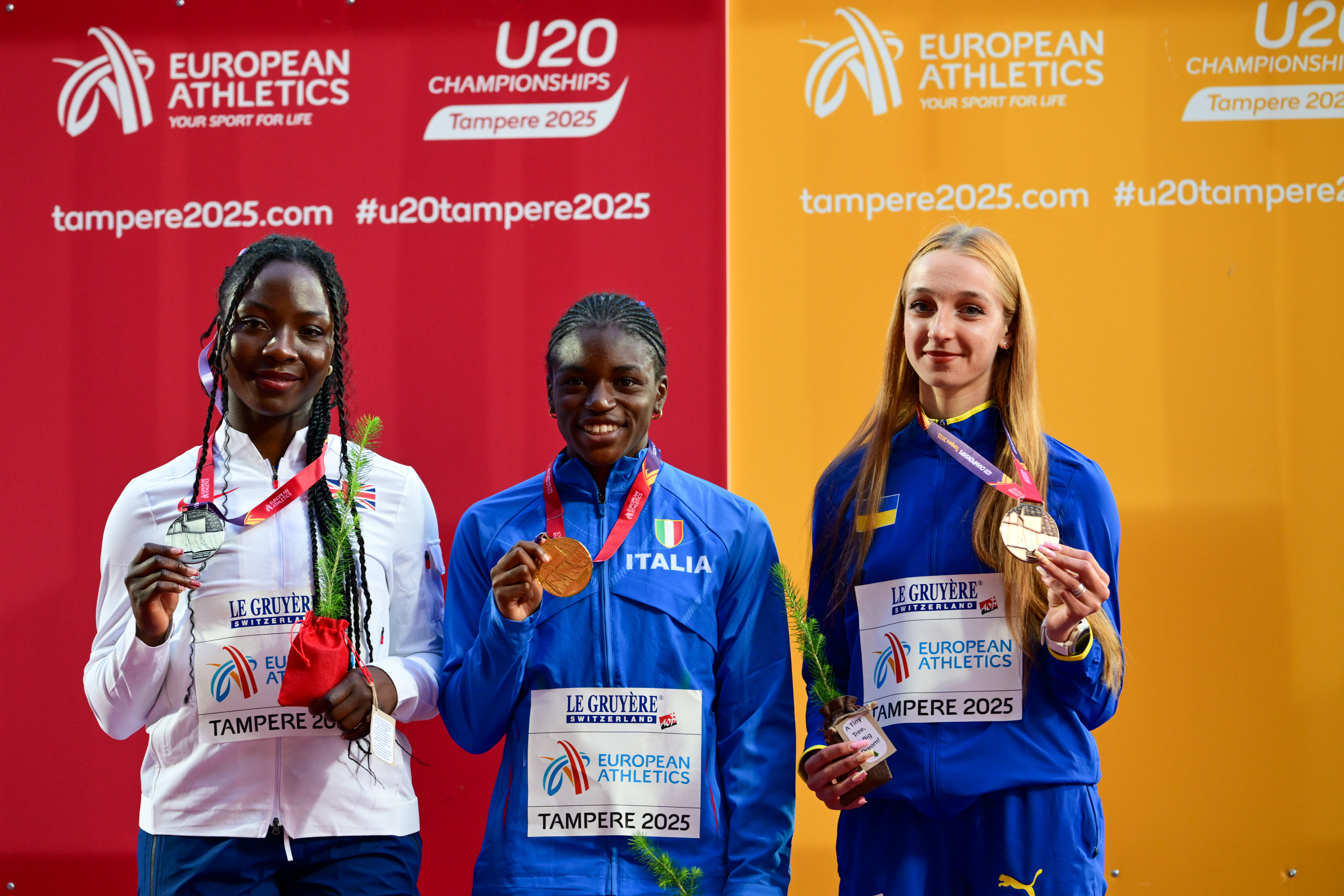
Podium of women's 100 m: Mabel Akande (silver), Kelly Doualla (gold), Uliana Stepaniuk (bronze).

The 2025 European Athletics U20 Championships was the twenty-eighth edition of the biennial athletics competition between European athletes under the age of twenty. The 2025 European Athletics U20 Championships were organized by European Athletics Association and held from 7–10 August 2025 in Tampere, Finland.

== Medal table ==
* Host nation (Finland)

Rank	Nation	Gold	Silver	Bronze	Total
1	Italy	6	3	5	14
2	Great Britain	5	7	1	13
3	Spain	5	3	6	14
4	Germany	3	6	1	10
5	France	3	5	0	8
6	Netherlands	3	3	2	8
7	Norway	3	1	2	6
8	Hungary	3	1	1	5
9	Czech Republic	3	0	6	9
10	Croatia	2	0	0	2
11	Sweden	1	3	1	5
12	Turkey	1	2	0	3
13	Poland	1	1	6	8
14	Romania	1	1	0	2
15	Belgium	1	0	2	3
16	Switzerland	1	0	1	2
17	Greece	1	0	0	1
17	Ireland	1	0	0	1
19	Finland*	0	4	3	7
20	Ukraine	0	1	2	3
21	Bulgaria	0	1	1	2
21	Latvia	0	1	1	2
23	Portugal	0	1	0	1
23	Slovenia	0	1	0	1
25	Denmark	0	0	1	1
25	Estonia	0	0	1	1
25	Lithuania	0	0	1	1
25	Serbia	0	0	1	1
Totals (28 entries)		44	45	45	134

== Medal summary ==
=== Men ===
Event	Gold		Silver		Bronze	
100 metres	Ander Garaiar; Spain	10.40	Jozuah Revierre; Netherlands Teddy Wilson; Great Britain	10.47 [.464]	Not awarded	
200 metres	Diego Nappi; Italy	20.77	Pedro Afonso; Portugal	20.85	Oriol Sánchez; Spain	21.03
400 metres	Conor Kelly; Ireland	45.83 NU20R	Milann Klemenic; France	46.44	Ondřej Loupal; Czech Republic	46.62
800 metres	Rafferty Mirfin; Great Britain	1:48.09	Tom Waterworth; Great Britain	1:48.20	Aaron Ceballos; Spain	1:48.74
1500 metres	Håkon Moe Berg; Norway	3:47.36	Andreas Dybdahl; Norway	3:47.95	Elliot Vermeulen; Belgium	3:48.03
3000 metres	Håkon Moe Berg; Norway	8:43.20	Kristers Kudlis; Latvia	8:45.56	Karl Ottfalk; Sweden	8:46.43
5000 metres	Willem Renders; Belgium	14:14.59	Karl Ottfalk; Sweden	14:14.78 SB	Magnus Øyen; Norway	14:15.32
110 metres hurdles (99 cm)	Matteo Togni; Italy	13.27 NU20R, EU20L	Hristiyan Kasabov; Bulgaria	13.31 NU20R	Matyáš Zach; Czech Republic	13.33
400 metres hurdles	Michal Rada; Czech Republic	48.78 CR, NU20R, WU20L	Iker Moreno; Spain	49.66 NU20R	Marek Vána; Czech Republic	50.46 PB
400 metres hurdles	Michal Rada; Czech Republic	48.78 CR, NU20R, WU20L	Iker Moreno; Spain	49.66 NU20R	Quinten De Vos; Netherlands	50.46 NU20R
3000 metres steeplechase	Kıyasettin Kara; Turkey	8:43.55 NU20R	Marti Torregrossa; Spain	8:45.20 PB	Andres Lara; Spain	8:45.53 PB
4 × 100 metres relay	Gaël Delaumenie; Lenny Chanteur; Hugo Jacquet-Dzong; Ylann Bizasene; France	39.57 SB	Enzo Kieß; Louis Schuster; Felix Schulze; Jakob Kemminer; Alwin Mawumba*; Germany	39.78 SB	Aleksander Wojtasik; Adrian Lepionka; Marcin Tabaka; Sebastian Libura; Patryk Radwan*; Poland	40.17 SB
4 × 400 metres relay	Ondřej Loupal; Lukáš Mareš; Tomáš Horák; Michal Rada; Martin Koreček*; Václav Apltauer*; Jakub Marek*; Šimon Ceplý*; Czech Republic	3:05.79 EU20L, NU20R	Iker Moreno; Aaron Gaston; Helio Marco; Óscar Crespo; Marco Sáiz*; Sergi Pons*; Spain	3:06.83 NU20R	Destiny Omodia; Daniele Salemi; Diego Mancini; Simone Giliberto; Italy	3:07.39 SB
10,000 metres walk	Joan Querol; Spain	39:10.04 CR, EU20L, NU20R	Giuseppe Disabato; Italy	39:20.87 NU20R	Daniel Monfort; Spain	39:50.77 PB
High jump	Elijah Pasquier; France	2.25 m NU20R	Otis Poole; Great Britain	2.19 m	Jin van der Lee; Netherlands	2.16 m PB
Pole vault	Axel Rogö; Sweden	5.45 m EU20L, PB	Zackaria Dia; France	5.40 m PB	Ylio Philtjens; Belgium	5.30 m
Pole vault	Axel Rogö; Sweden	5.45 m EU20L, PB	Zackaria Dia; France	5.40 m PB	Paweł Pośpiech; Poland	5.30 m PB
Long jump	Petr Meindlschmid; Czech Republic	7.89 m SB	Daniele Inzoli; Italy	7.69 m	Luka Bošković; Serbia	7.69 m
Triple jump	Francesco Crotti; Italy	15.93 m PB	Emre Çolak; Turkey	15.75 m PB	Zinga Barbosa Firmino; Bulgaria	15.71 m
Shot put (6 kg)	Jarno van Daalen; Netherlands	21.07 m	Aatu Kangasniemi; Finland	20.82 m PB	Jakub Rodziak; Poland	19.37 m PB
Discus throw (1.75 kg)	Jarno van Daalen; Netherlands	63.18 m	Jakub Rodziak; Poland	62.90 m PB	Zombor Dobó; Hungary	62.26 m
Hammer throw (6 kg)	Ármin Szabados; Hungary	82.91 m	Mico Lampinen; Finland	74.67 m	Aatu Kangasniemi; Finland	74.41 m
Javelin throw	Rafael Mahiques; Spain	76.30 m	Oskar Jänicke; Germany	76.17 m PB	Roch Krukowski; Poland	76.01 m PB
Decathlon (U20)	Hubert Trościanka; Poland	8514 pts WU20R, CR, PB	Luuk Pelkmans; Netherlands	8293 pts NU20R, PB	Leon Krummenacher; Switzerland	7972 pts PB

* Indicates the athletes only competed in the preliminary heats and received medals

=== Women ===
Event	Gold		Silver		Bronze	
100 metres	Kelly Doualla; Italy	11.22	Mabel Akande; Great Britain	11.41	Uliana Stepaniuk; Ukraine	11.53
200 metres	Judith Bilepo Mokobe; Germany	23.40	Lucy Tallon; Great Britain	23.49	Terezie Táborská; Czech Republic	23.49
400 metres	Charlotte Henrich; Great Britain	51.68 PB	Johanna Martin; Germany	52.00	Anastazja Kuś; Poland	52.23
800 metres	Jana Becker; Germany	2:01.67	Živa Remic; Slovenia	2:01.76 PB	Lorenza de Noni; Italy	2:01.86
1500 metres	Lyla Belshaw; Great Britain	4:14.59	Carmen Cernjul; Sweden	4:15.00	Isobelle Jones; Great Britain	4:16.18 PB
3000 metres	Innes Fitzgerald; Great Britain	8:46.39 CR	Carmen Cernjul; Sweden	9:08.87	Wilma Bekkemoen Torbiörnsson; Norway	9:10.70
5000 metres	Innes Fitzgerald; Great Britain	15:09.04	Edibe Yağız; Turkey	15:43.60 PB	Julia Ehrle; Germany	15:44.06 PB
100 metres hurdles	Jil Sanchez; Switzerland	13.24	Melissa Benfatah; France	13.29	Alessia Succo; Italy	13.32
400 metres hurdles	Alexandra Ștefania Uță; Romania	55.55 CR, EU20L, PB	Méta Tumba; France	55.56 NU20R	Viola Hambidge; Estonia	56.71 NU20R
3000 metres steeplechase	Andrea Nygård Vie; Norway	9:57.59	Jule Jutta Lindner; Germany	9:58.77	Ema Berková; Czech Republic	10:09.71 NU20R
4 × 100 metres relay	Alice Pagliarini; Elisa Valensin; Margherita Castellani; Kelly Doualla; Elisa Calzolari*; Italy	43.72 NU20R	Nell Desir; Lucy Tallon; Kaya Slater; Mabel Akande; Jessica Mantle*; Great Britain	43.98	Małgorzata Pojęta; Wiktoria Gajosz; Oliwia Kasprzak; Jagoda Żukowska; Aleksandra Jeż*; Poland	44.07 NU20R
4 × 400 metres relay	Victoria Kwarteng; Noam Tanon; Romane Trinquant; Méta Tumba; Lys-Aurore Agbayissah*; Alicia Lopez*; Emilie Montout*; France	3:33.56 EU20L	Luna Fischer; Pauline Richter; Katharina Rupp; Jana Marie Becker; Ida Carlotta Schröder*; Luise Sommer*; Cäcilia Weimann*; Germany	3:34.35 SB	Francesca Meletto; Laura Frattaroli; Alice Caglio; Giulia Macchi; Italy	3:34.65 SB
10,000 metres walk	Sofia Santacreu; Spain	43:47.89 NU20R, WU20L	Serena di Fabio; Italy	43:56.25 NU20R	Aldara Meilán; Spain	44:15.89 PB
High jump	Lilianna Bátori; Hungary	1.89 m	Ella Mikkola; Finland	1.89 m	Ona Bonet; Spain	1.86 m
Pole vault	Elise de Jong; Netherlands	4.50 m =PB	Marijn Kieft; Netherlands	4.40 m	Apolena Švábíková; Czech Republic	4.35 m PB
Long jump	Bori Rózsahegyi; Hungary	6.46 m	Thea Brown; Great Britain	6.44 m PB	Diana Myroshnichenko; Ukraine	6.37 m
Triple jump	Erika Saraceni; Italy	14.24 m CR, PB	Daria Vrînceanu; Romania	13.75 m PB	Adriana Krūzmane; Latvia	13.62 m PB
Shot put	Maria Rafailídou; Greece	16.16 m	Anhelina Shepel; Ukraine	15.62 m PB	Anita Nalesso; Italy	15.62 m
Discus throw	Andrea Tankeu; Spain	54.28 m PB	Curly Brown; Germany	54.16 m	Anne Juul Jensen; Denmark	52.63 m
Hammer throw	Nova Kienast; Germany	67.93 m	Marie Rougetet; France	67.38 m PB	Pinja Kärhä; Finland	66.07 m
Javelin throw	Vita Barbić; Croatia	55.26 m	Rebecca Nelimarkka; Finland	54.43 m	Orinta Navikaite; Lithuania	54.36 m
Heptathlon	Jana Koščak; Croatia	6293 pts =NR, WU20L	Sarolta Kriszt; Hungary	6251 pts NU20R	Enni Virjonen; Finland	6060 pts PB

* Indicates the athletes only competed in the preliminary heats and received medals

== Entry standards ==
Event	Men	Quota	Women	Rounds
100 metres	10.62	32	11.80	3
200 metres	21.55	32	24.40	3
400 metres	48.15	32	55.50	3
800 metres	1:50.00	24	2:07.80	2
1500 metres	3:47.50	24	4:24.00	2
3000 metres	8:17.00	24	9:48.00	2
5000 metres	14:26.00	24	17:05.00	1
110/100 metres hurdles	14.12	32	13.92	3
400 metres hurdles	52.50	32	1:00.00	3
3000 metres steeplechase	8:55.00	24	10:20.00	2
10,000 metres race walk	45:30.00	24	51:00.00	1
4 × 100 metres relay		16		2
4 × 400 metres relay		16		2
High jump	2.11 m (6 ft 11 in)	24	1.80 m (5 ft 10 3/4 in)	2
Pole vault	5.12 m (16 ft 9 1/2 in)	24	4.00 m (13 ft 1 1/4 in)	2
Long jump	7.40 m (24 ft 3 1/4 in)	24	6.20 m (20 ft 4 in)	2
Triple jump	15.05 m (49 ft 4 1/2 in)	24	12.85 m (42 ft 1 3/4 in)	2
Shot put	17.80 m (58 ft 4 3/4 in)	24	14.10 m (46 ft 3 in)	2
Discus throw	54.50 m (178 ft 9 1/2 in)	24	47.50 m (155 ft 10 in)	2
Hammer throw	68.00 m (223 ft 1 in)	24	57.50 m (188 ft 7 3/4 in)	2
Javelin throw	66.00 m (216 ft 6 1/4 in)	24	48.50 m (159 ft 1 1/4 in)	2
Decathlon/Heptathlon	7200	20	5350	1

== Participation ==
1,295 athletes (650 men and 645 women) from 48 nations are expected to participate in these championships.

- Albania (1)
- Andorra (2)
- Armenia (2)
- Austria (15)
- Azerbaijan (1)
- Belgium (27)
- Bosnia and Herzegovina (1)
- Bulgaria (16)
- Croatia (17)
- Cyprus (9)
- Czech Republic (62)
- Denmark (15)
- Estonia (24)
- Finland (55)
- France (77)
- Georgia (3)
- Germany (111)
- Gibraltar (1)
- Great Britain (62)
- Greece (45)
- Hungary (40)
- Iceland (2)
- Ireland (40)
- Israel (14)
- Italy (91)
- Kosovo (2)
- Latvia (20)
- Lithuania (10)
- Luxembourg (2)
- Malta (5)
- Moldova (3)
- Monaco (2)
- Montenegro (1)
- Netherlands (41)
- North Macedonia (2)
- Norway (35)
- Poland (73)
- Portugal (30)
- Romania (21)
- San Marino (2)
- Serbia (20)
- Slovakia (24)
- Slovenia (28)
- Spain (87)
- Sweden (53)
- Switzerland (50)
- Turkey (41)
- Ukraine (49)
