= 2026 World Athletics U20 Championships – Men's decathlon =

Men's decathlon at the 2026 World Athletics U20 Championships
- Venue: Hayward Field
- Dates: 7 August 2026; 8 August 2026
- Competitors: 33 from 23 nations
- Winning time: 8112 WU20L

Medalists
gold medal	Liam Belo da Silva	Sweden
silver medal	Mikai Snoek	Netherlands
bronze medal	Adam Juliš	Czech Republic

The men's decathlon at the 2026 World Athletics U20 Championships was held at Hayward Field in Eugene, United States on 7 and 8 August 2026.

== Records ==
U20 standing records prior to the 2026 World Athletics U20 Championships were as follows:

Record	Athlete & Nationality	Mark	Location	Date
World U20 Record	Hubert Trościanka (POL)	8514	Tampere, Finland	8 August 2025
Championship Record	Tomas Järvinen (CZE)	8425	Lima, Peru	30 August 2024
World U20 Leading	Liam Belo da Silva (SWE)	7981	Jessheim, Norway	14 June 2026

== Results ==
The highest mark recorded in each event is highlighted in yellow

Place	Athlete	Nation	100m	LJ	SP	HJ	400m	110m H	DT	PV	JT	1500m	Points	Notes
1st place, gold medalist(s)	Liam Belo da Silva	Sweden	11.25	7.02	15.50	2.15 CDB	50.95	15.12	51.95 CDB	4.80	55.83 PB	4:39.51 SB	8112	WU20L
2nd place, silver medalist(s)	Mikai Snoek	Netherlands	11.16 PB	6.76 PB	15.56	1.88	50.15 PB	14.89 PB	46.62	4.40	70.25 PB	4:38.53 PB	7887	PB
3rd place, bronze medalist(s)	Adam Juliš	Czech Republic	10.77 SB	7.03 PB	13.87	1.76	49.13 PB	13.71 SB	42.27	4.80 PB	59.92 SB	4:42.15 PB	7877	PB
4	Kilian Trochain	France	10.89 PB	6.74	14.47 PB	1.97 SB	48.32 PB	13.88	42.57 PB	4.80	46.78 PB	4:37.78 PB	7856	PB
5	David Berglund	Sweden	11.02 PB	7.10	15.39	1.94 PB	49.69 PB	14.27	40.90	5.00	44.18 SB	4:56.89 SB	7700	PB
6	Daniel von der Heyden	South Africa	10.82	7.17 PB	16.05	1.85	49.15 PB	14.93	43.65	4.00	57.68 PB	4:45.49 PB	7696	AU20R
7	Mael-Bephassou Lannurien	France	10.89	7.12	13.65	2.12 PB	48.00	13.99	35.84	4.00	48.24 PB	4:37.55 PB	7691	
8	Matteo Sorci	Italy	10.81 PB	6.92	13.49	2.03 PB	48.32 SB	14.51 PB	41.29	4.30	45.68 PB	4:34.52 PB	7663	NU20R
9	Wyatt Hill	Australia	10.72 PB	6.77	12.81 PB	1.85	48.95 PB	14.30 PB	40.19	4.30 PB	61.55	4:44.17	7595	PB
10	Tristan Konso	Estonia	10.84 PB	6.94	13.88	1.85	48.55 PB	14.02 SB	44.21 SB	4.70	37.99	4:51.00 SB	7538	PB
11	Nikolaos Kosmopoulos	Greece	10.90	7.16 PB	13.93 SB	1.91 SB	48.28	14.30	41.76	4.40	40.76	4:51.02	7511	
12	Bohuslav Čertík	Czech Republic	11.01	6.31	13.14	1.82	49.60	14.42	46.76 PB	4.90	41.83	4:45.87 PB	7383	
13	Brody Foster	United States	11.34	6.91	14.50 PB	1.97 PB	50.51	15.37	42.85	4.90 PB	54.78	5:29.37	7374	
14	Nevis Thommen	Switzerland	10.96 PB	6.92 PB	14.25	1.76	50.19	14.35	42.52	4.40	53.98	5:07.57 SB	7350	
15	Xavier Davie	Australia	11.14 SB	6.74	13.26	1.91 PB	49.26	15.20	39.44	3.90 PB	55.52	4:27.49 PB	7338	PB
16	Denis Hrabar	Portugal	11.46	6.78	15.31	1.91 PB	50.33 PB	15.01	36.50	4.60	45.14	4:33.68	7324	NU20R
17	Samuel Falieu-Mané	Portugal	11.02	6.62	12.47 PB	1.88 SB	49.96 SB	14.25	38.88 PB	4.40	47.37 PB	4:46.92	7230	
18	Kenny Moxey	Bahamas	11.04 PB	6.75	14.76 PB	2.00	49.32 PB	14.88	35.22 PB	4.20	48.65	5:15.48	7179	PB
19	Eoin O`Callaghan	Ireland	11.17	6.57 SB	14.56	1.82	49.97	14.48	38.39	3.80	54.96 PB	4:48.04	7159	PB
20	Samuel Newton	Great Britain	11.53	6.70	14.76 PB	1.94	51.34	14.81	42.14	4.00	51.18	5:03.70	7110	
21	Kacper Góralczyk	Poland	10.82 PB	6.64	13.06	1.85	47.94	14.95	32.19	4.40	45.33	4:51.94	7105	
22	Andre Jürisson	Estonia	10.79	6.90	13.33	1.97	49.46 PB	14.46 PB	42.02	3.60	41.83 PB	5:13.50 PB	7085	
23	Zalán Zemen	Hungary	11.04 PB	6.69	13.38	1.85 SB	49.82 PB	13.70 CDB	28.94	4.40	44.36 PB	4:51.67 SB	7080	
24	Mads Vincentsen	Denmark	11.42	6.59	12.97	1.85	51.01	14.60	35.19	4.10 PB	52.27	4:35.56 PB	7033	
25	Kiichi Miyashita	Japan	10.97 SB	7.24 PB	13.24 PB	1.85	48.67 SB	14.78 PB	NM	3.70 PB	64.42 PB	4:27.25 SB	6946	
26	Walid Fares Ghettas	Algeria	11.13	6.91	12.81	1.82	50.36	15.62	37.27 PB	3.80	37.69	4:56.42	6659	
27	Mani Anker	Switzerland	11.41 PB	6.55	14.22 PB	1.88	51.77	15.10	NM	4.10	51.76	4:54.89	6340	
28	Darius Jones	United States	10.92	6.31	14.32	1.91	DQ	14.20	39.28	NM	46.26	4:59.59	5698	
—	Alexander Adler	Germany	11.48	5.21	11.45	1.97 PB	51.48 PB	15.86	45.30	4.40	57.34	DNS	DNF	
—	Ernests Lešinskis	Latvia	11.08	6.44	13.69	1.82 PB	48.85	14.98	36.75	DNS			DNF	
—	Lorenz Wirth	Austria	11.31	6.12	13.84	1.82	53.33	DNF	DNS				DNF	
—	Sytse Lutgendorff	Netherlands	11.00 PB	7.34 PB	12.92	1.85	DNS						DNF	
—	Yannick Kraus	Germany	11.00 PB	7.17 PB	13.97	1.82	DNS						DNF	
—	Kārlis Feldmanis	Latvia	11.21	NM	13.13	1.82	DNS						DNF	
