= World Athletics U20 Championships =

Biennial championships by World Athletics

- Status: Active
- Genre: Under-20 athletics World Championships
- Date: Varying
- Frequency: Biennial
- Country: Varying
- Years active: 40
- Inaugurated: July 16, 1986 (as 1986 World Junior Championships in Athletics)
- Previous event: 2024 Lima
- Next event: 2026 Eugene
- Participants: 1,700+
- Organiser: World Athletics
- Website: WorldAthletics.org

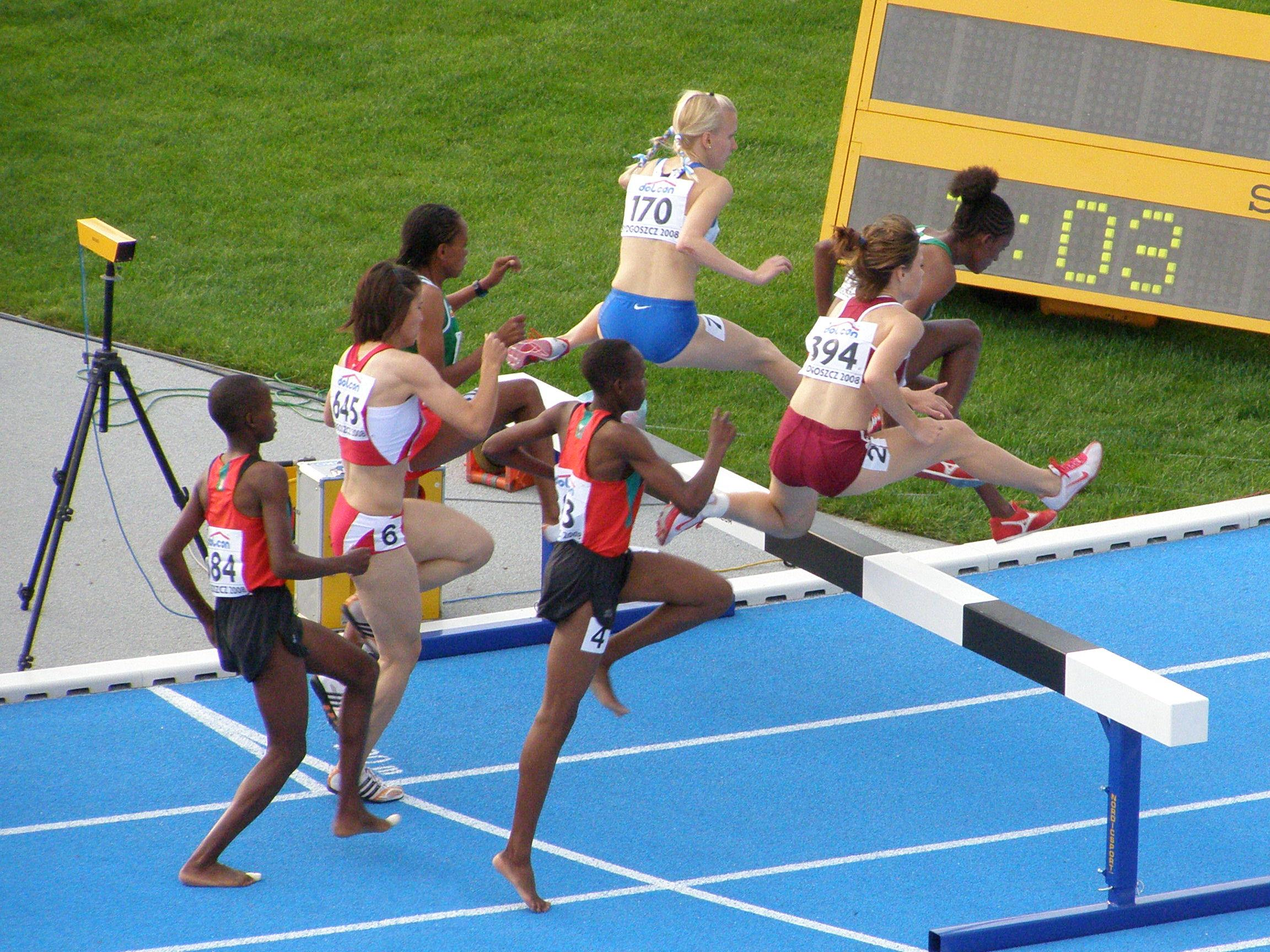
The final of the 3000m steeplechase at the 2008 Championships in Poland.

The World Athletics U20 Championships is a biennial world championships for the sport of athletics organised by the World Athletics, contested by athletes in the under-20 athletics age category (19 years old or younger on 31 December in the year of the competition).

The competition was launched as the IAAF World Junior Championships in Athletics in 1986 and renamed to IAAF World U20 Championships in November 2015. The current name was adapted with the name change of the sports governing body in 2019.

Anneisha McLaughlin-Whilby is the most successful athlete at the championships, having won one gold and four silver in individual and relay sprinting events between 2000 and 2004. Chris Nelloms, Davidson Ezinwa and Dexter Lee share the position of most successful male athlete, at four medals each.

== Championships ==
Ed.	Year	Host city	Host country	Date	Venue	Events	Nations	Athletes	Men	Women	Top of the medal table
1	1986	Athens	Greece	16–20 July	Athens Olympic Stadium	41	142	1135	752	383	East Germany
2	1988	Sudbury	Canada	27–31 July	Laurentian University Stadium	41	123	1024	574	450	East Germany
3	1990	Plovdiv	Bulgaria	8–12 August	Deveti Septemvri Stadium	41	87	987	606	381	Soviet Union
4	1992	Seoul	South Korea	16–20 September	Seoul Olympic Stadium	41	90	954	535	419	China
5	1994	Lisbon	Portugal	20–24 July	Estádio Universitário de Lisboa	42	143	1139	674	465	United States
6	1996	Sydney	Australia	20–25 August	Sydney International Athletic Centre	41	142	1049	640	409	United States
7	1998	Annecy	France	28 July – 2 August	Parc des Sports	43	169	1156	657	499	China
8	2000	Santiago	Chile	17–22 October	Estadio Nacional de Chile	43	151	1122	638	484	Kenya
9	2002	Kingston	Jamaica	16–21 July	Independence Park	43	159	1069	630	439	United States
10	2004	Grosseto	Italy	12–18 July	Stadio Olimpico Comunale	44	168	1261	680	581	United States
11	2006	Beijing	China	15–20 August	Chaoyang Sport Centre	44	176	1350	742	608	Kenya
12	2008	Bydgoszcz	Poland	8–13 July	Zdzisław Krzyszkowiak Stadium	44	165	1408	757	651	United States
13	2010	Moncton	Canada	19–25 July	Moncton Stadium	44	163	1313	746	567	Kenya
14	2012	Barcelona	Spain	10–15 July	Estadi Olímpic Lluís Companys	44	171	1566	856	710	United States
15	2014	Eugene	United States	22–27 July	Hayward Field	44	175	1546	831	715	United States
16	2016	Bydgoszcz	Poland	19–24 July	Zdzisław Krzyszkowiak Stadium	44	140	1359			United States
17	2018	Tampere	Finland	10–15 July	Tampere Stadium	44	158	1462			Kenya
18	2021	Nairobi	Kenya	17–22 August	Moi International Sports Centre	45	116	958	523	435	Kenya
19	2022	Cali	Colombia	2–7 August	Estadio Olímpico Pascual Guerrero	45	145	1533	824	709	United States
20	2024	Lima	Peru	26–31 August	Estadio Atlético de la VIDENA	45	134	1720			United States
21	2026	Eugene	United States	5–9 August	Hayward Field	46	147	1858	955	861	United States

The 2016 Championships were due to be held in Kazan, Russia before the IAAF's suspension of the All-Russia Athletic Federation, which prohibits Russia from hosting international competitions. The championships were relocated as a result.

== All-time medal table ==
As of 2026 World Athletics U20 Championships.

Rank	Nation	Gold	Silver	Bronze	Total
1	United States	135	95	73	303
2	Kenya	96	76	58	230
3	Ethiopia	54	56	35	145
4	China	45	49	39	133
5	Russia	43	32	26	101
6	Jamaica	42	55	46	143
7	Germany	35	41	42	118
8	Great Britain	31	29	44	104
9	Cuba	29	33	24	86
10	South Africa	25	22	23	70
11	East Germany	22	10	18	50
12	Romania	21	20	15	56
13	France	20	20	20	60
14	Soviet Union	18	16	22	56
15	Australia	17	34	34	85
16	Nigeria	15	13	10	38
17	Finland	14	14	17	45
18	Bulgaria	14	6	7	27
19	Sweden	13	12	8	33
20	Poland	12	21	21	54
21	Ukraine	10	11	13	34
22	Czech Republic	10	7	4	21
23	Italy	9	8	15	32
24	Qatar	9	5	5	19
25	Croatia	9	4	4	17
26	Belarus	8	12	14	34
27	Trinidad and Tobago	8	2	7	17
28	Japan	7	18	34	59
29	Netherlands	7	7	15	29
30	Mexico	7	5	1	13
31	Spain	6	15	12	33
32	Estonia	5	5	4	14
33	Uganda	5	4	11	20
34	Botswana	5	3	2	10
35	Brazil	5	2	10	17
36	Bahamas	5	0	6	11
37	New Zealand	5	0	5	10
38	Uzbekistan	5	0	1	6
39	Hungary	4	15	9	28
40	Norway	4	6	3	13
41	Morocco	4	3	17	24
42	Serbia	4	3	4	11
43	Unified Team	4	2	5	11
44	Greece	3	9	8	20
45	Switzerland	3	9	7	19
46	Canada	3	8	12	23
47	Algeria	3	5	1	9
48	Turkey	3	4	5	12
49	Latvia	3	4	2	9
50	Slovenia	3	4	1	8
51	West Germany	3	3	3	9
52	India	2	6	6	14
53	Bahrain	2	3	8	13
54	Lithuania	2	3	1	6
55	Israel	2	1	0	3
–	Authorised Neutral Athletes	2	1	0	3
56	Moldova	2	0	2	4
57	Montenegro	2	0	0	2
58	Ecuador	1	5	3	9
59	Colombia	1	4	4	9
60	Yugoslavia	1	3	3	7
61	Argentina	1	3	1	5
61	Egypt	1	3	1	5
63	Namibia	1	3	0	4
64	Belgium	1	2	6	9
65	Slovakia	1	2	4	7
66	Portugal	1	2	3	6
67	Saudi Arabia	1	2	2	5
68	Sudan	1	2	1	4
69	Austria	1	2	0	3
70	Cyprus	1	1	3	5
71	Grenada	1	1	2	4
72	British Virgin Islands	1	1	1	3
72	Chile	1	1	1	3
74	Iran	1	1	0	2
74	Tunisia	1	1	0	2
76	Barbados	1	0	3	4
77	Peru	1	0	1	2
78	Dominican Republic	1	0	0	1
78	Indonesia	1	0	0	1
78	Turks and Caicos Islands	1	0	0	1
81	Eritrea	0	4	2	6
81	Tanzania	0	4	2	6
83	Ireland	0	4	1	5
84	Czechoslovakia	0	3	2	5
85	South Korea	0	2	5	7
86	Djibouti	0	2	0	2
87	Chinese Taipei	0	1	3	4
88	Guyana	0	1	1	2
88	Kazakhstan	0	1	1	2
88	Kuwait	0	1	1	2
88	Thailand	0	1	1	2
92	Antigua and Barbuda	0	1	0	1
92	Burundi	0	1	0	1
92	Denmark	0	1	0	1
92	Malawi	0	1	0	1
92	Netherlands Antilles	0	1	0	1
92	Saint Kitts and Nevis	0	1	0	1
92	Seychelles	0	1	0	1
92	Venezuela	0	1	0	1
100	Ghana	0	0	2	2
100	Zimbabwe	0	0	2	2
102	Azerbaijan	0	0	1	1
102	Cayman Islands	0	0	1	1
102	Dominica	0	0	1	1
102	Fiji	0	0	1	1
102	Guatemala	0	0	1	1
102	Iceland	0	0	1	1
102	Kyrgyzstan	0	0	1	1
102	Luxembourg	0	0	1	1
102	Serbia and Montenegro	0	0	1	1
102	U.S. Virgin Islands	0	0	1	1
102	Uruguay	0	0	1	1
Totals (112 entries)		907	922	912	2,741

== Championships records ==
=== Men ===
Event	Record	Athlete	Nation	Date	Meet	Place	Age	Ref.
100 m	9.91 A (+0.8 m/s) WU20R	Letsile Tebogo	Botswana	2 August 2022	2022 Championships	Cali, Colombia	19 years, 56 days	
200 m	19.83 (+0.1 m/s)	Tate Taylor	United States	8 August 2026	2026 Championships	Eugene, United States	18 years, 316 days	
400 m	44.47	Jayden DeLeon	United States	7 August 2026	2026 Championships	Eugene, United States	18 years, 224 days	
800 m	1:43.76 A	Emmanuel Wanyonyi	Kenya	22 August 2021	2021 Championships	Nairobi, Kenya	17 years, 21 days	
1500 m	3:35.53	Abdalaati Iguider	Morocco	15 July 2004	2004 Championships	Grosseto, Italy	17 years, 112 days	
3000 m	7:28.28	Emmanuel Kiprono	Kenya	7 August 2026	2026 Championships	Eugene, United States	17 years, 225 days	
5000 m	13:08.57	Abreham Cherkos	Ethiopia	13 July 2008	2008 Championships	Bydgoszcz, Poland	18 years, 294 days	
110 m hurdles (0.99 m)	12.72 A (+1.0 m/s) WJR	Sasha Zhoya	France	21 August 2021	2021 Championships	Nairobi, Kenya	19 years, 57 days	
110 m hurdles (0.99 m)	12.72 (+0.7 m/s) WU20R	Le'Ezra Brown	United States	8 August 2026	2026 Championships	Eugene, United States	19 years, 155 days	
400 m hurdles	48.51	Kerron Clement	United States	16 July 2004	2004 Championships	Grosseto, Italy	18 years, 259 days	
3000 m steeplechase	8:06.10	Conseslus Kipruto	Kenya	15 July 2012	2012 Championships	Barcelona, Spain	17 years, 220 days	
High jump	2.37 m WJR	Dragutin Topić	Yugoslavia	12 August 1990	1990 Championships	Plovdiv, Bulgaria	19 years, 153 days	
High jump	2.37 m WJR	Steve Smith	Great Britain	20 September 1992	1992 Championships	Seoul, South Korea	19 years, 175 days	
Pole vault	5.82 m	Armand Duplantis	Sweden	14 July 2018	2018 Championships	Tampere, Finland	18 years, 246 days	
Long jump	8.20 m (+1.4 m/s)	James Stallworth	United States	9 August 1990	1990 Championships	Plovdiv, Bulgaria	19 years, 102 days	
Triple jump	17.27 m A (±0.0 m/s)	Jaydon Hibbert	Jamaica	5 August 2022	2022 Championships	Cali, Colombia	17 years, 200 days	
Shot put (6 kg)	22.20 m	Jacko Gill	New Zealand	11 July 2012	2012 Championships	Barcelona, Spain	17 years, 204 days	
Shot put (6 kg)	22.30 m X	Andrei Toader	Romania	19 July 2016	2016 Championships	Bydgoszcz, Poland	19 years, 54 days	
Shot put (6 kg)	23.34 m X	Konrad Bukowiecki	Poland	19 July 2016	2016 Championships	Bydgoszcz, Poland	19 years, 124 days	
Discus throw (1.75 kg)	69.81 m A	Mykolas Alekna	Lithuania	22 August 2021	2021 Championships	Nairobi, Kenya	18 years, 328 days	
Hammer throw (6 kg)	85.57 m WJR	Ashraf Amgad Elseify	Qatar	14 July 2012	2012 Championships	Barcelona, Spain	17 years, 145 days	
Javelin throw	86.48 m WJR	Neeraj Chopra	India	23 July 2016	2016 Championships	Bydgoszcz, Poland	18 years, 212 days	
Decathlon	8425 pts	Tomas Järvinen	Czech Republic	29–30 August 2024	2024 Championships	Lima, Peru	18 years, 314 days	
Decathlon	100m (wind) / Long jump (wind) / Shot put / High jump / 400m / 110m H (wind) / Discus / Pole vault / Javelin / 1500m; 10.82 (−0.2 m/s) / 7.66 m (+1.5 m/s) / 13.54 m (6 kg) / 2.12 m / 48.88 / 13.78 (−0.2 m/s) (0.99 m) / 49.18 m (1.750 kg) / 4.60 m / 55.79 m / 4:29.78							
5000 m walk (track)	18:40.37 WU20R	Isaac Beacroft	Australia	8 August 2026	2026 Championships	Eugene, United States	19 years, 21 days	
10,000 m walk (track)	39:24.85	Rayen Cherni	Tunisia	30 August 2024	2024 Championships	Lima, Peru	17 years, 303 days	
4 × 100 m relay	38.16 WU20R	Blake Hamilton; Dillon Mitchell; Kyler Brown; Tate Taylor	United States	9 August 2026	2026 Championships	Eugene, United States	18 years, 347 days 16 years, 248 days 19 years, 183 days 18 years, 317 days	
4 × 400 m relay	3:01.09 WJR	Brandon Johnson; LaShawn Merritt; Jason Craig; Kerron Clement	United States	18 July 2004	2004 Championships	Grosseto, Italy	19 years, 138 days 18 years, 21 days 19 years, 126 days 18 years, 261 days	

==== Decathlon disciplines ====
Event	Record	Points	Athlete	Nation	Date	Meet	Place	Age	Ref.
100 m	10.51 (−0.3 m/s)	973	Ashley Moloney	Australia	10 July 2018	2018	Tampere, Finland	18 years, 119 days	
Long jump	7.74 m (+1.2 m/s)	995	Cedric Dubler	Australia	22 July 2014	2014	Eugene, United States	19 years, 190 days	
Shot put (6 kg)	16.51 m	883	Yordanis García	Cuba	16 August 2006	2006	Beijing, China	17 years, 268 days	
High jump	2.15 m	944	Attila Zsivoczky	Hungary	21 August 1996	1996	Sydney, Australia	19 years, 114 days	
High jump	2.15 m	944	Liam Belo da Silva	Sweden	7 August 2026	2026	Eugene, United States	19 years, 39 days	
400 m	46.86	965	Ashley Moloney	Australia	10 July 2018	2018	Tampere, Finland	18 years, 119 days	
110 m hurdles (0.99 m)	13.70 (+0.5 m/s)	1,014	Zalán Zemen	Hungary	8 August 2026	2026	Eugene, United States	18 years, 276 days	
Discus throw (1.750 kg)	51.95 m	911	Liam Belo da Silva	Sweden	8 August 2026	2026	Eugene, United States	19 years, 40 days	
Pole vault	5.00 m	910	Ilya Shkurenyov	Russia	21 July 2010	2010	Moncton, Canada	19 years, 191 days	
Pole vault	5.00 m	910	Mathias Ako	France	23 July 2014	2014	Eugene, United States	18 years, 360 days	
Javelin throw	71.59 m	914	Niklas Kaul	Germany	20 July 2016	2016	Bydgoszcz, Poland	18 years, 160 days	
1500 m	4:21.35	802	Kevin Mayer	France	21 July 2010	2010	Moncton, Canada	18 years, 161 days	

==== Defunct events ====
Event	Record	Athlete	Nation	Date	Meet	Place	Age	Ref.
10,000 m	27:21.08	Rhonex Kipruto	Kenya	10 July 2018	2018 Championships	Tampere, Finland	18 years, 271 days	
20 kilometres road run	59:27	Metaferia Zeleke	Ethiopia	31 July 1988	1988 Championships	Sudbury, Canada		
2,000 m steeplechase	5:28.56	Jon Azkueta	Spain	20 July 1986	1986 Championships	Athens, Greece	19 years, 18 days	

=== Women ===
Event	Record	Athlete	Nation	Date	Meet	Place	Age	Ref.
100 m	10.95 A (−0.1 m/s)	Tina Clayton	Jamaica	3 August 2022	2022 Championships	Cali, Colombia	17 years, 351 days	
200 m	21.84 A (+1.1 m/s)	Christine Mboma	Namibia	21 August 2021	2021 Championships	Nairobi, Kenya	18 years, 91 days	
400 m	50.50	Ashley Spencer	United States	13 July 2012	2012 Championships	Barcelona, Spain	19 years, 35 days	
800 m	1:59.13 A	Roisin Willis	United States	3 August 2022	2022 Championships	Cali, Colombia	17 years, 362 days	
1500 m	4:04.64 A	Brenda Chebet	Kenya	6 August 2022	2022 Championships	Cali, Colombia	18 years, 143 days	
3000 m	8:41.76	Beyenu Degefa	Ethiopia	20 July 2016	2016 Championships	Bydgoszcz, Poland	17 years, 8 days	
5000 m	14:57.44	Mekedes Alemeshete	Ethiopia	27 August 2024	2024 Championships	Lima, Peru	18 years, 150 days	
100 m hurdles	12.77 A (+0.2 m/s)	Kerrica Hill	Jamaica	6 August 2022	2022 Championships	Cali, Colombia	17 years, 153 days	
400 m hurdles	54.70	Lashinda Demus	United States	19 July 2002	2002 Championships	Kingston, Jamaica	19 years, 131 days	
3000 m steeplechase	9:12.71	Sembo Almayew	Ethiopia	29 August 2024	2024 Championships	Lima, Peru	19 years, 218 days	
High jump	2.00 m	Alina Astafei	Romania	29 July 1988	1988 Championships	Sudbury, Canada	19 years, 52 days	
Pole vault	4.55 m	Angelica Moser	Switzerland	21 July 2016	2016 Championships	Bydgoszcz, Poland	18 years, 286 days	
Long jump	6.82 m (+1.7 m/s)	Fiona May	Great Britain	30 July 1988	1988 Championships	Sudbury, Canada	18 years, 231 days	
Triple jump	14.62 m (+1.0 m/s) WJR	Tereza Marinova	Bulgaria	25 August 1996	1996 Championships	Sydney, Australia	18 years, 335 days	
Shot put	18.76 m	Cheng Xiaoyan	China	21 July 1994	1994 Championships	Lisbon, Portugal	18 years, 233 days	
Discus throw	68.24 m	Ilke Wyludda	East Germany	31 July 1988	1988 Championships	Sudbury, Canada	19 years, 125 days	
Hammer throw	71.64 m A	Silja Kosonen	Finland	21 August 2021	2021 Championships	Nairobi, Kenya	18 years, 248 days	
Javelin throw	63.52 m A	Adriana Vilagoš	Serbia	2 August 2022	2022 Championships	Cali, Colombia	18 years, 212 days	
Heptathlon	6470 pts	Carolina Klüft	Sweden	19–20 July 2002	2002 Championships	Kingston, Jamaica	19 years, 168 days	
Heptathlon	100m H (wind) / High jump / Shot put / 200m (wind) / Long jump (wind) / Javelin / 800m; 13.53 (+1.2 m/s) / 1.92 m / 12.18 m / 23.81 (+0.2 m/s) / 6.19 m (+0.0 m/s) / 46.83 m / 2:13.55							
5000 m walk (track)	20:57.57	Serena Di Fabio	Italy	8 August 2026	2026 Championships	Eugene, United States	18 years, 258 days	
10,000 m walk (track)	42:47.25 WJR	Anežka Drahotová	Czech Republic	23 July 2014	2014 Championships	Eugene, United States	19 years, 1 day	
4 × 100 m relay	42.59 A WU20R	Serena Cole; Tina Clayton; Kerrica Hill; Tia Clayton	Jamaica	5 August 2022	2022 Championships	Cali, Colombia	18 years, 40 days 17 years, 353 days 17 years, 152 days 17 years, 352 days	
4 × 400 m relay	3:27.60 WJR	Alexandria Anderson; Ashlee Kidd; Stephanie Smith; Natasha Hastings	United States	18 July 2004	2004 Championships	Grosseto, Italy	17 years, 172 days 18 years, 358 days 19 years, 21 days 17 years, 361 days	

==== Heptathlon disciplines ====
Event	Record	Score	Athlete	Nation	Date	Meet	Place	Age	Ref.
100 m hurdles	13.23 (+1.3 m/s)	1090 pts	Thea Brown	Great Britain	5 August 2026	2026 Championships	Eugene, United States	19 years, 139 days	
High jump	1.94 m	1158 pts	Morgan Lake	Great Britain	22 July 2014	2014 Championships	Eugene, United States	17 years, 71 days	
Shot put	14.72 m	842 pts	Zola Ndouma-Mona	France	5 August 2026	2026 Championships	Eugene, United States	19 years, 73 days	
200 m	23.78 (−1.6 m/s)	1002 pts	Svetla Dimitrova	Bulgaria	29 July 1988	1988 Championships	Sudbury, Canada	18 years, 184 days	
Long jump	6.35 m (−0.4 m/s)	959 pts	Tatyana Chernova	Russia	16 August 2006	2006 Championships	Beijing, China	18 years, 199 days	
Javelin throw	54.16 m	941 pts	Justine Robbeson	South Africa	17 July 2004	2004 Championships	Grosseto, Italy	19 years, 63 days	
800 m	2:09.37	974 pts	Agathe Guillemot	France	13 July 2018	2018 Championships	Tampere, Finland	19 years, 2 days	

==== Defunct event ====
Event	Record	Athlete	Nation	Date	Meet	Place	Age	Ref.
10,000 m	32:29.90	Wang Junxia	China	19 September 1992	1992 Championships	Seoul, South Korea	19 years, 254 days	

=== Mixed ===
Event	Record	Athlete	Nation	Date	Meet	Place	Age	Ref.
4 × 400 m relay	3:15.31	Joshua Shelton; Taylor-Nicole Overton; Jaelen Hunter; Olivia Harris	United States	5 August 2026	2026 Championships	Eugene, United States	18 years, 37 days 17 years, 68 days 17 years, 70 days 17 years, 273 days	

== Disqualifications ==
=== Doping ===
Several athletes have been stripped of medals due to doping.

Athlete	Nation	Sex	Event	Result	Year
Juan Miguel López	Cuba	Men	Triple jump	Silver	1986
Vladyslav Piskunov	Ukraine	Men	Hammer throw	Gold	1994
Seema Antil	India	Women	Discus throw	Gold	2000
Katsiaryna Artsiukh	Belarus	Women	400 metres hurdles	Gold	2010
Geisa Arcanjo	Brazil	Women	Shot put	Gold	2010
Konrad Bukowiecki	Poland	Men	Shot put	Gold	2016
Andrei Toader	Romania	Men	Shot put	Silver	2016
Adel Jaber Al-Asseri	Saudi Arabia	Men	200 metres		2008

=== Age falsification ===
Two athletes subsequently lost their medals as a result of fraudulently misstating their age on official documents: Bahrain's 2006 steeplechase silver medallist Tareq Mubarak Taher and Morocco's Ahmed Baday (1998 5000 metres bronze). In addition to this, later analysis of Moses Kiptanui's age when having won the 1990 1500m showed he was marginally over age (aged 19 years, 315 days) at the time of his victory, though this result has not been rescinded.

== Title defenses ==
Given the age limitations on the competition it is rare that athletes get the opportunity to defend previous individual titles. A total of 22 athletes have managed this feat, eight of them men and fourteen women. In addition to this Anita Weyermann won the 3000 m title after taking the 1500 m title two years earlier.

Men
Athlete	Nation	Event	Years
Wilfred Kirochi	Kenya	1500 metres	1986–88
Dexter Lee	Jamaica	100 metres	2008–10
Jonathan Ndiku	Kenya	3000 metres steeplechase	2008–10
Jacko Gill	New Zealand	Shot put	2010–12
Ashraf Amgad Elseify	Qatar	Hammer throw	2012–14
Jaheel Hyde	Jamaica	400 metres hurdles	2014–16
Lázaro Martínez	Cuba	Triple jump	2014–16
Erwan Konate	France	Long jump	2021–22
Letsile Tebogo	Botswana	100 metres	2021–22

Women
Athlete	Nation	Event	Years
Svetla Dimitrova	Bulgaria	Heptathlon	1986–88
Ilke Wyludda	East Germany	Discus throw	1986–88
Gillian Russell	Jamaica	100 metres hurdles	1990–92
Irina Stankina	Russia	5000 metres walk	1994–96
Osleidys Menéndez	Cuba	Javelin throw	1996–98
Blanka Vlašić	Croatia	High jump	2000–02
Ivana Brkljačić	Croatia	Hammer throw	2000–02
Carolina Klüft	Sweden	Heptathlon	2000–02
Ma Xuejun	China	Discus throw	2002–04
Bianca Perie	Romania	Hammer throw	2006–08
Mirela Lavric	Romania	800 metres	2008–10
Mercy Cherono	Kenya	3000 metres	2008–10
Dailenys Alcántara	Cuba	Triple jump	2008–10
Angelica Bengtsson	Sweden	Pole vault	2010–12
Adriana Vilagoš	Serbia	Javelin	2021–22
Miné De Klerk	South Africa	Shot put	2021–22
Tina Clayton	Jamaica	100 metres	2021–22
Saga Vanninen	Finland	Heptathlon	2021–22
Kerrica Hill	Jamaica	100 metres hurdles	2022-24
Sharifa Davronova	Uzbekistan	Triple jump	2022-24

== Doubles ==
A total of fifteen athletes have won two individual titles at the same championships (nine men, six women). The majority of these are sprint or long-distance combinations, although Andrew Howe (200 m and long jump), Margus Hunt (discus throw and shot put) and Morgan Lake (high jump and heptathlon) managed to win novel doubles. Many others achieved a double between an individual victory and being a member of a winning relay team.

Men
Athlete	Nation	Events	Year
Peter Chumba	Kenya	5000 metres, 10,000 metres	1986
Ato Boldon	Trinidad and Tobago	100 metres, 200 metres	1992
Haile Gebrselassie	Ethiopia	5000 metres, 10,000 metres	1992
Daniel Komen	Kenya	5000 metres, 10,000 metres	1994
Francis Obikwelu	Nigeria	100 metres, 200 metres	1996
Assefa Mezgebu	Ethiopia	5000 metres, 10,000 metres	1996
Christian Malcolm	United Kingdom	100 metres, 200 metres	1998
Andrew Howe	Italy	200 metres, long jump	2004
Margus Hunt	Estonia	Discus throw, shot put	2006
Bayanda Walaza	South Africa	100 metres, 200 metres	2024

Women
Athlete	Nation	Events	Year
Yin Lili	China	3000 metres, 5000 metres	1998
Veronica Campbell	Jamaica	100 metres, 200 metres	2000
Meseret Defar	Ethiopia	3000 metres, 5000 metres	2002
Tezdzhan Naimova	Bulgaria	100 metres, 200 metres	2006
Anthonique Strachan	Bahamas	100 metres, 200 metres	2012
Morgan Lake	Great Britain	High jump, heptathlon	2014
Briana Williams	Jamaica	100 metres, 200 metres	2018
Maja Åskag	Sweden	Long jump, triple jump	2021

== See also ==
- World Para Athletics Junior Championships
