= Liam Belo da Silva =

Swedish athlete (born 2007)

Personal information
- Born: 29 June 2007 (age 19)

Sport
- Sport: Athletics
- Event: Decathlon
Medal record
Men's athletics
Representing SWE
World U20 Championships
Gold medal – first place	2026 Eugene	Decathlon
European U18 Championships
Silver medal – second place	2024 Banska Bystrica	Decathlon

Liam Belo da Silva (born 29 June 2007) is a Swedish multi-event athlete. He won the gold medal in decathlon at the 2026 World U20 Championships.

== Biography ==
A member of IFK Växjö, as a 16 year-old he won the Swedish indoor age-group championship in the heptathlon.

With a total of 7318 points he was the decathlon silver medalist at the 2024 European Athletics U18 Championships in Slovakia. At the 2025 European Athletics U20 Championships in Tampere, he placed fifth overall in decathlon with a total of 7632 points.

Competing indoors in March 2026, he won the Swedish U20 indoor long jump title and placed second in the high jump at the senior Swedish Indoor Athletics Championships. He set a new personal best with a best tally of 7981 points record while winning the 2026 Nordic Championship Combined Events in Jessheim in June. With the tally, he was the world leader at U20 level heading into the decathlon at the 2026 World Athletics U20 Championships in Eugene, United States. At the championships, he trailed Mael-Bephassou Lannurien of France by 99 points, 4258 points to 4159, after the first day of competition. After the second day of competition, Belo da Silva had broken 8000 points for the first time to win the decathlon gold medal with a national U20 record tally of 8112 points. He was nominated for European Athletics Men’s Rising Star for 2026.
