= Yaojiayuan station =

Beijing Subway Line 3 station

Yaojiayuan 姚家园
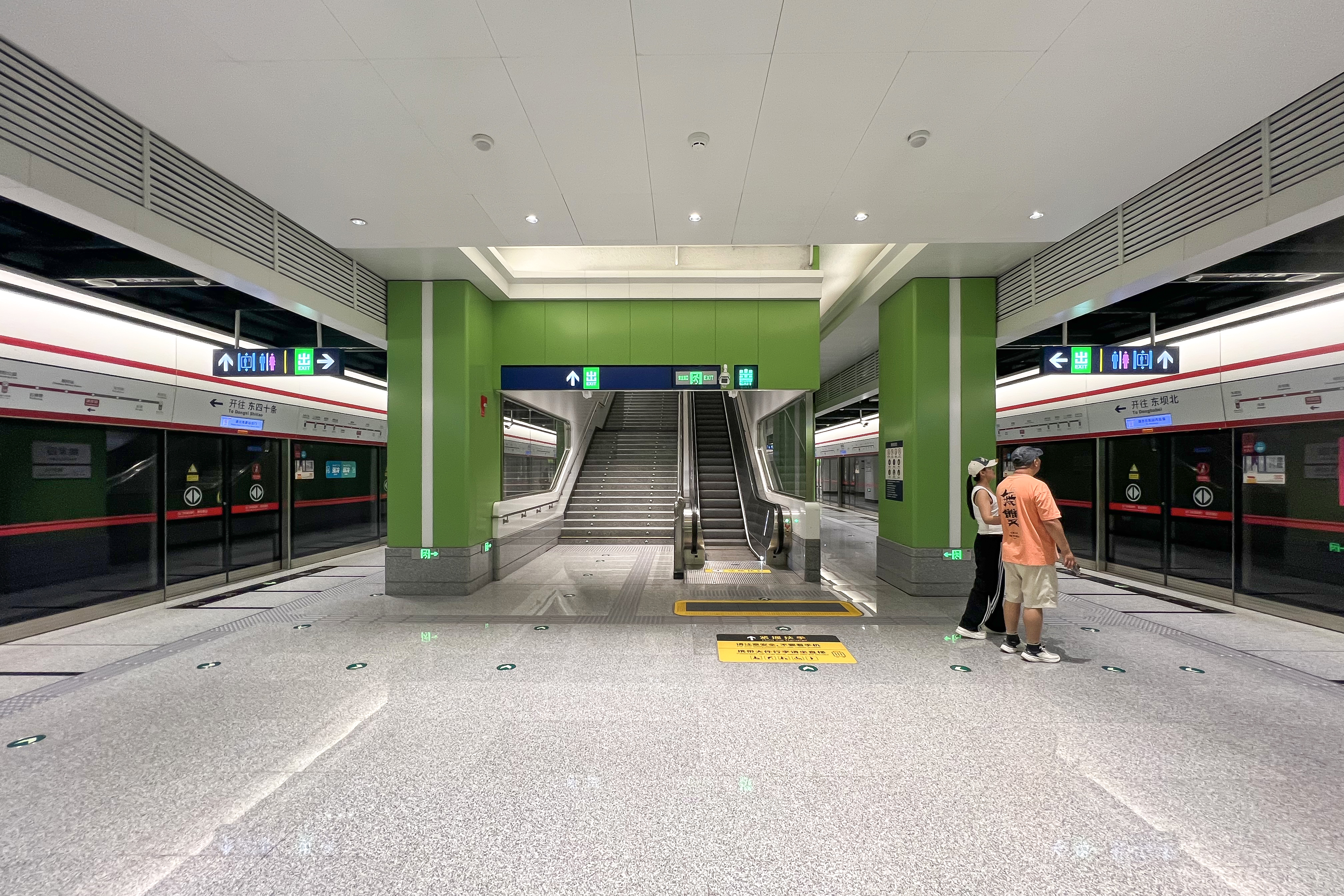
- Platform

Chinese name
- Simplified Chinese: 姚家园站
- Traditional Chinese: 姚家園站
Transcriptions
Standard Mandarin
- Hanyu Pinyin: Yáojiāyuán zhàn

General information
- Location: East of the intersection of Chaoyang Sports Center West Road (朝阳体育中心西路), Yaojiayuan North 1st Road (姚家园北一路) and Chaoyang Sports Center Street (朝体中心街), Pingfang Area; Chaoyang District, Beijing; China
- Coordinates: 39°56′48″N 116°31′16″E
- Operator: Beijing Mass Transit Railway Operation Corporation Limited
- Line: Line 3
- Platforms: 2 (1 island platform)
- Tracks: 2

Construction
- Structure type: Underground
- Accessible: Yes

History
- Opened: December 15, 2024; 20 months ago
- Former names: Sports Center (体育中心)

Services
Preceding station	Beijing Subway	Following station
Chaoyang railway station towards Dongsi Shitiao	Line 3	Dongbanan towards Dongbabei
Location
- Location within Beijing

Yaojiayuan station (simplified Chinese: 姚家园站; traditional Chinese: 姚家園站; pinyin: Yáojiāyuán zhàn) is a station on Line 3 of the Beijing Subway. It opened on December 15, 2024.

== Location ==
The station is located underground east of the intersection of Chaoyang Sports Center West Road (朝阳体育中心西路), Yaojiayuan North 1st Road (姚家园北一路) and Chaoyang Sports Center Street (朝体中心街) in Pingfang Area, Chaoyang District.

== Station features ==
The station has an underground island platform.

== Exits ==
There are 3 exits, lettered A, B and D. Exit D has an accessible elevator.

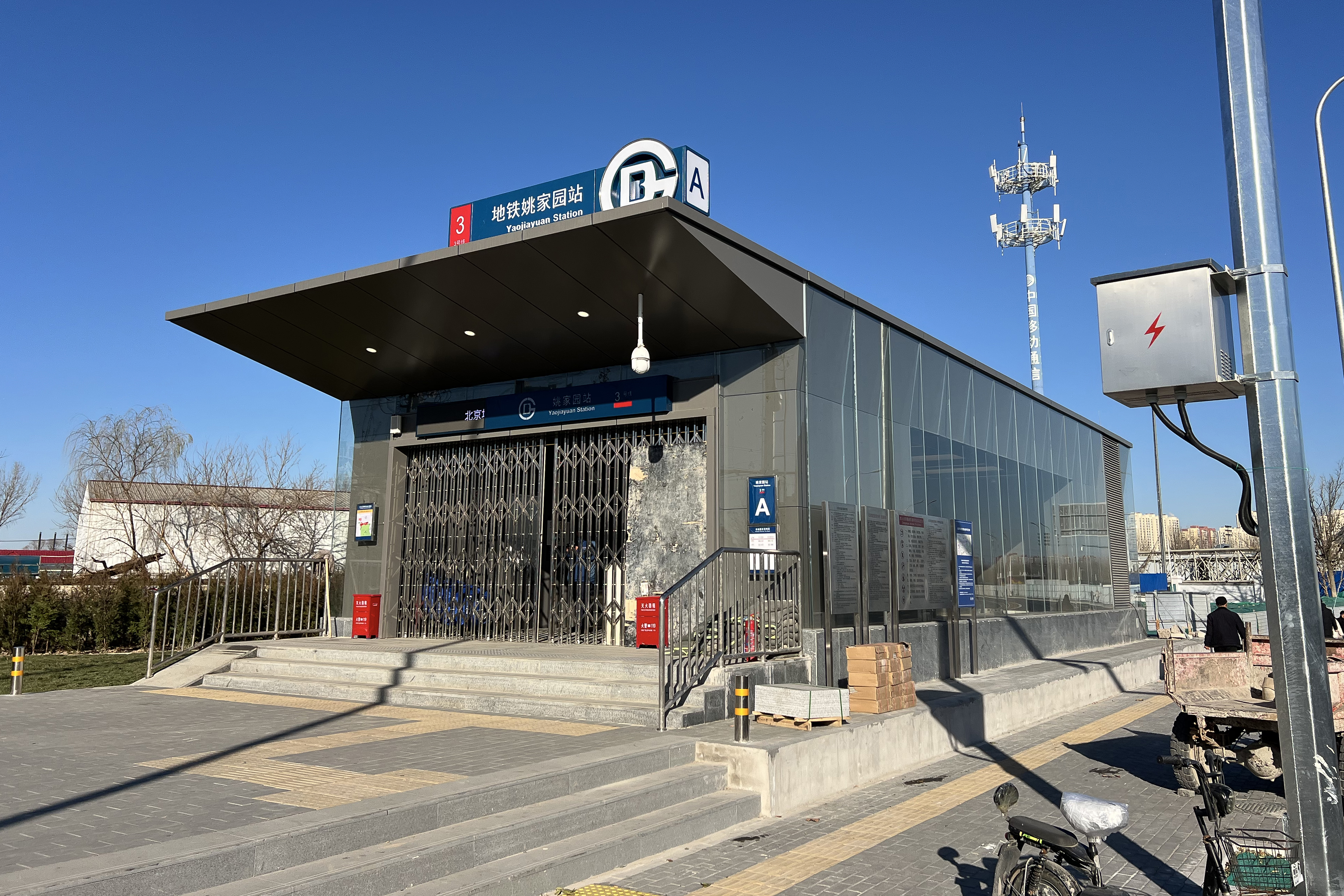
Exit A

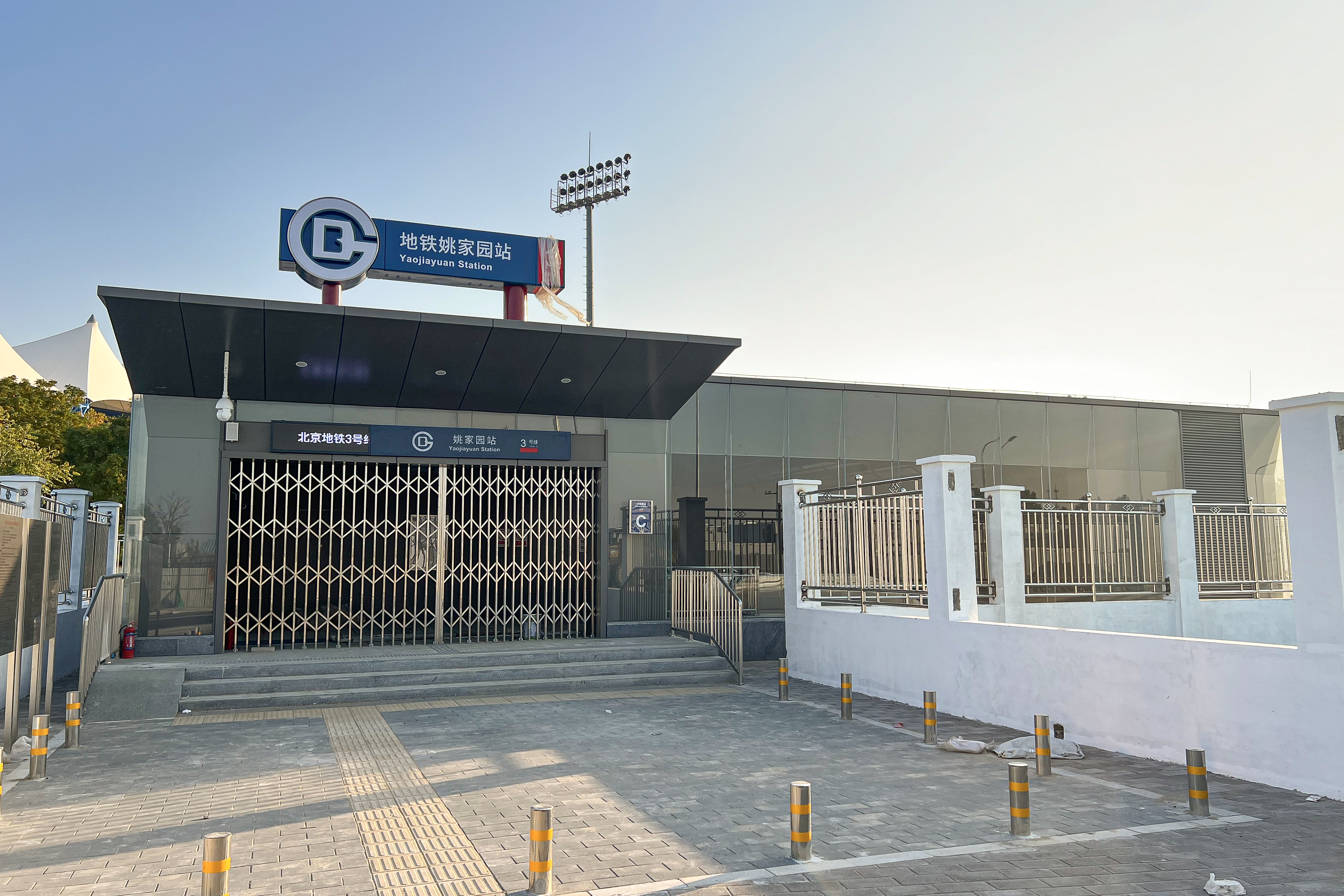
Exit C

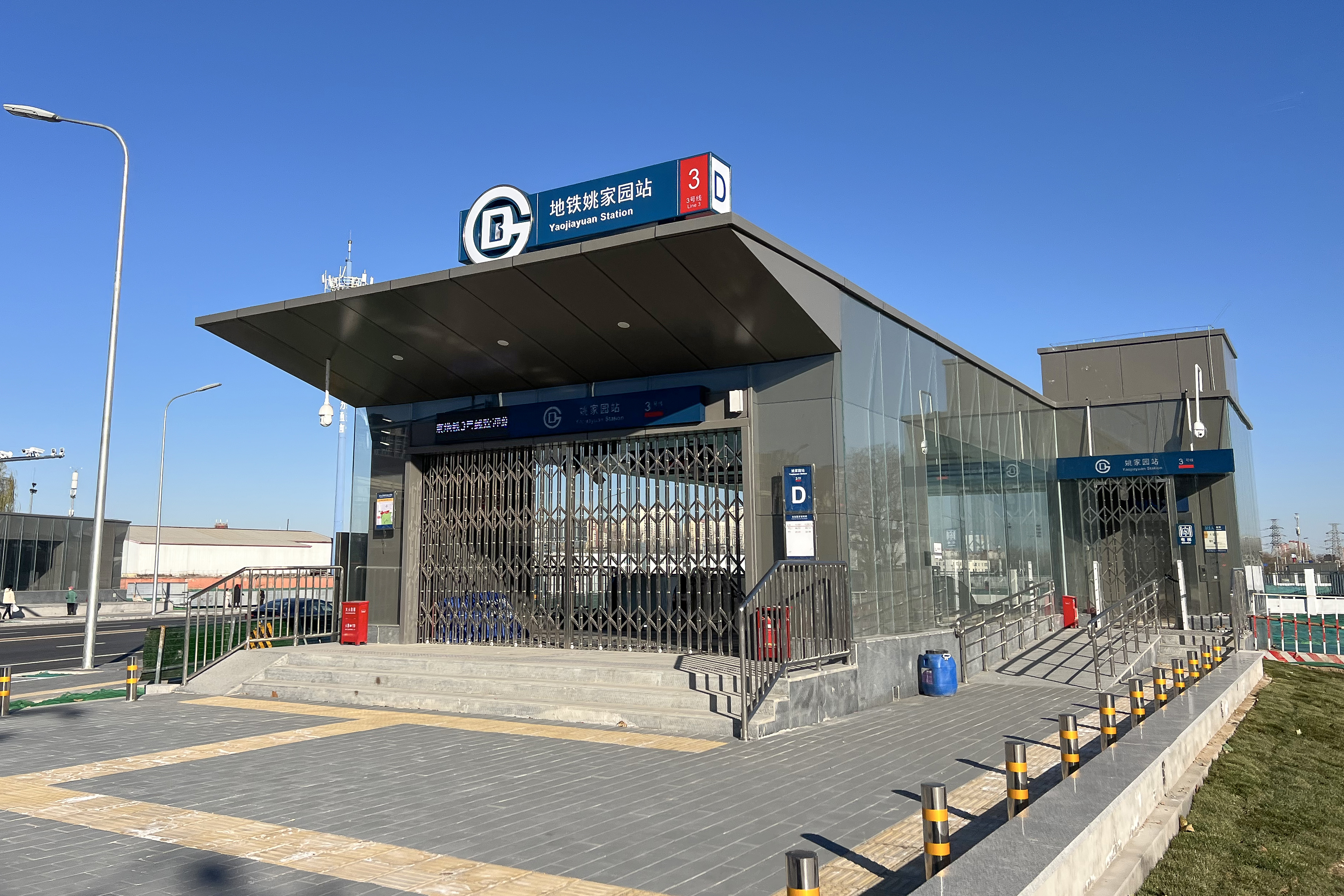
Exit D

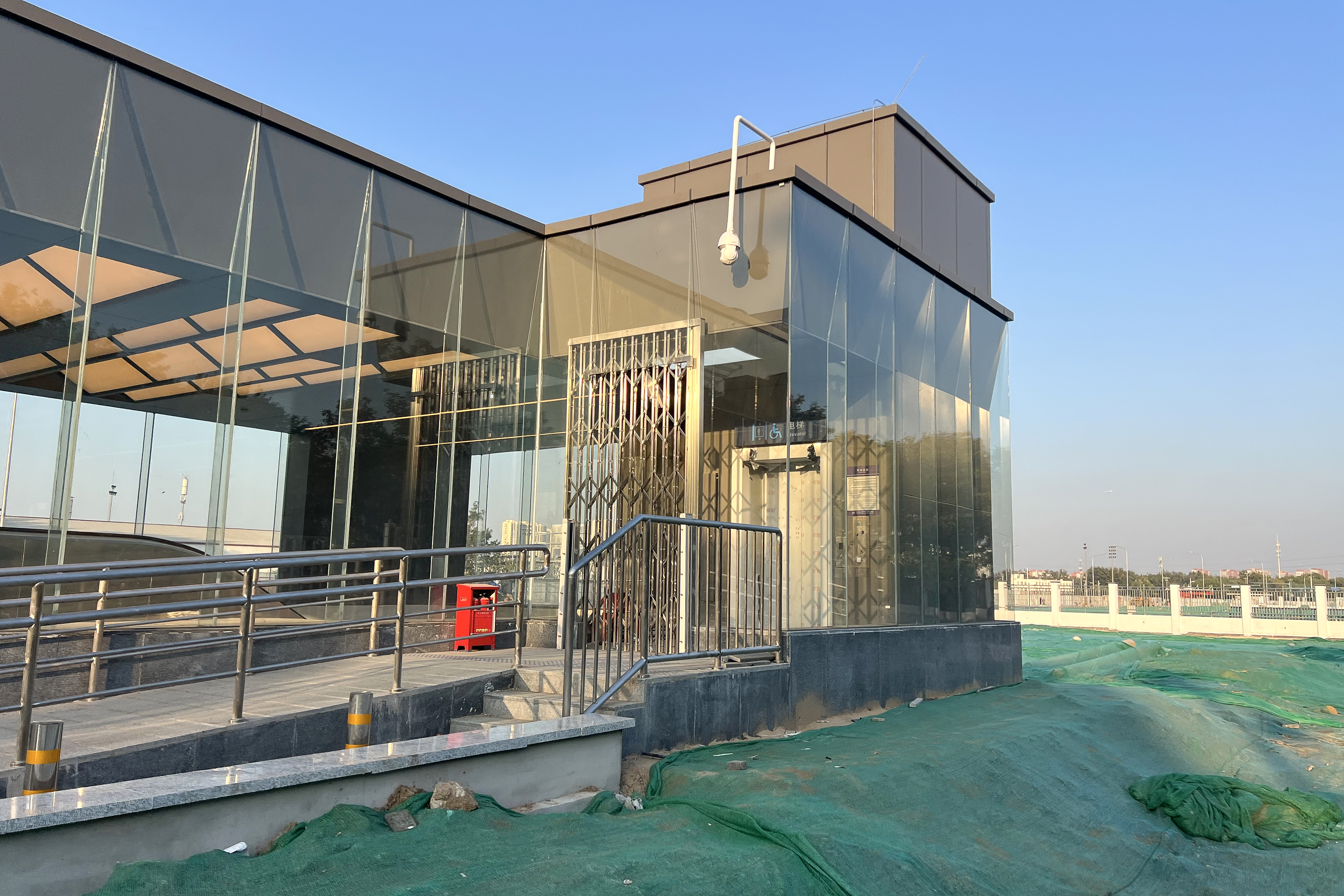
Exit D accessible exit

== History ==
The station was previously named as Sports Center. On January 18, 2024, it was officially renamed to Yaojiayuan.

== Near the station ==
- Chaoyang Sports Center
