= Chaoyang Sports Centre =

Sports venue in Beijing, China

Coordinates: 39°56′44″N 116°31′26″E

Chaoyang Sports Centre (Simplified Chinese: 朝阳体育中心) is a multi-use stadium in Chaoyang District, Beijing, China. It is currently used mostly for athletics matches. The stadium is able to hold 8,000 people and was opened in 2003. It hosted the events for the 2006 IAAF World Junior Championships in Athletics.

== Transport ==
- Yaojiayuan station
