= Dongba station =

Beijing Subway Line 3 station

Dongba 东坝
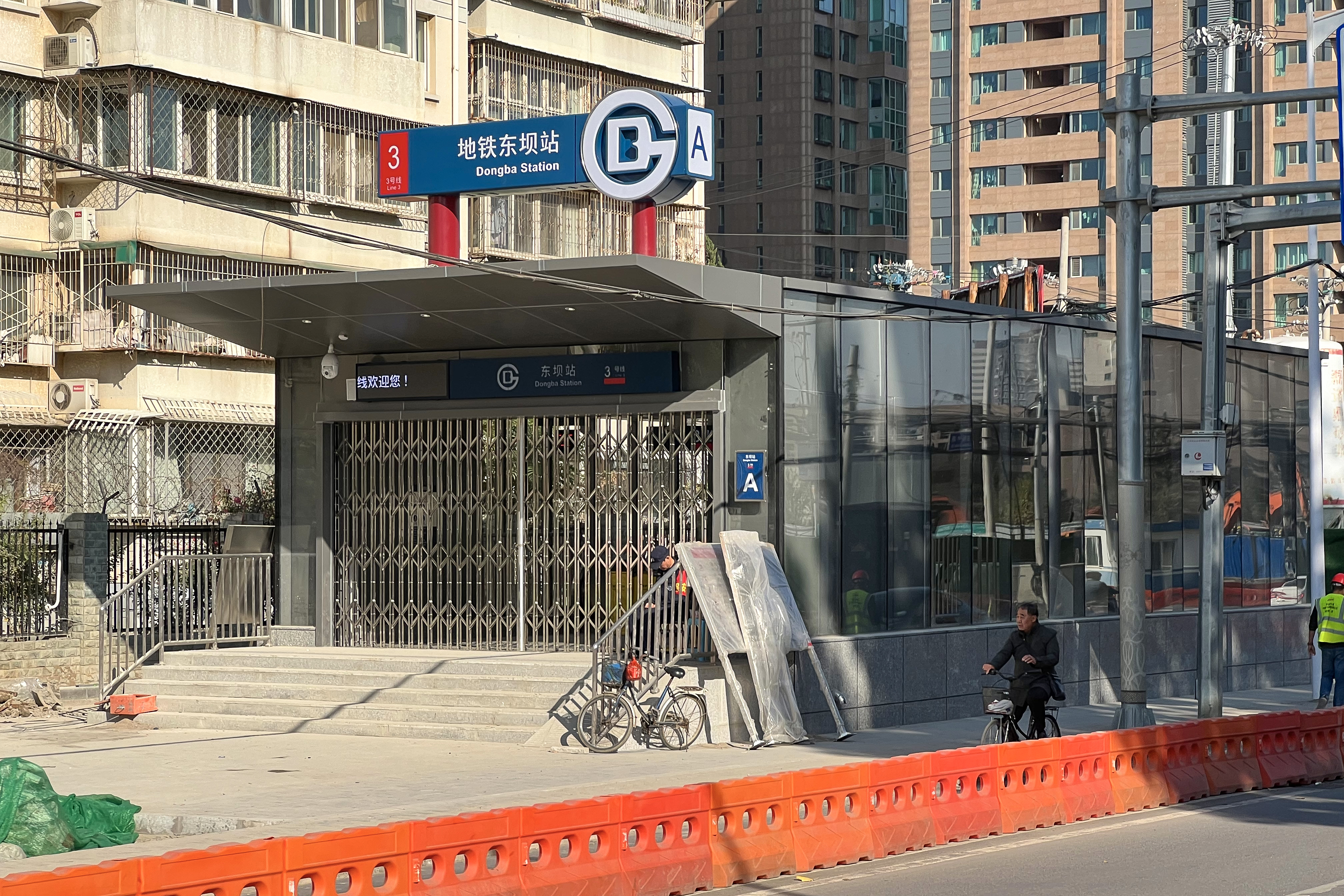
- Exit A (October 2024)

Chinese name
- Simplified Chinese: 东坝站
- Traditional Chinese: 東壩站
Transcriptions
Standard Mandarin
- Hanyu Pinyin: Dōngbà zhàn

General information
- Location: Intersection of Dongba Middle Street (东坝中街) and Dongba Middle Road (东坝中路), Louzizhuang (楼梓庄), Dongba Area; Chaoyang District, Beijing; China
- Coordinates: 39°57′50″N 116°32′29″E
- Operator: Beijing Mass Transit Railway Operation Corporation Limited
- Line: Line 3
- Platforms: 2 (1 island platform)
- Tracks: 2

Construction
- Structure type: Underground
- Accessible: Yes

History
- Opened: December 15, 2024; 20 months ago
- Former names: Dongba Zhongjie (东坝中街)

Services
Preceding station	Beijing Subway	Following station
Dongbanan towards Dongsi Shitiao	Line 3	Dongbabei Terminus
Location
- Location within Beijing

Dongba station (simplified Chinese: 东坝站; traditional Chinese: 東壩站; pinyin: Dōngbà zhàn) is a station on Line 3 of the Beijing Subway. It opened on December 15, 2024.

== Station features ==
The station has an underground island platform.

== Exits ==
There are 3 exits, lettered A, B and C. Exit C has an accessible elevator.

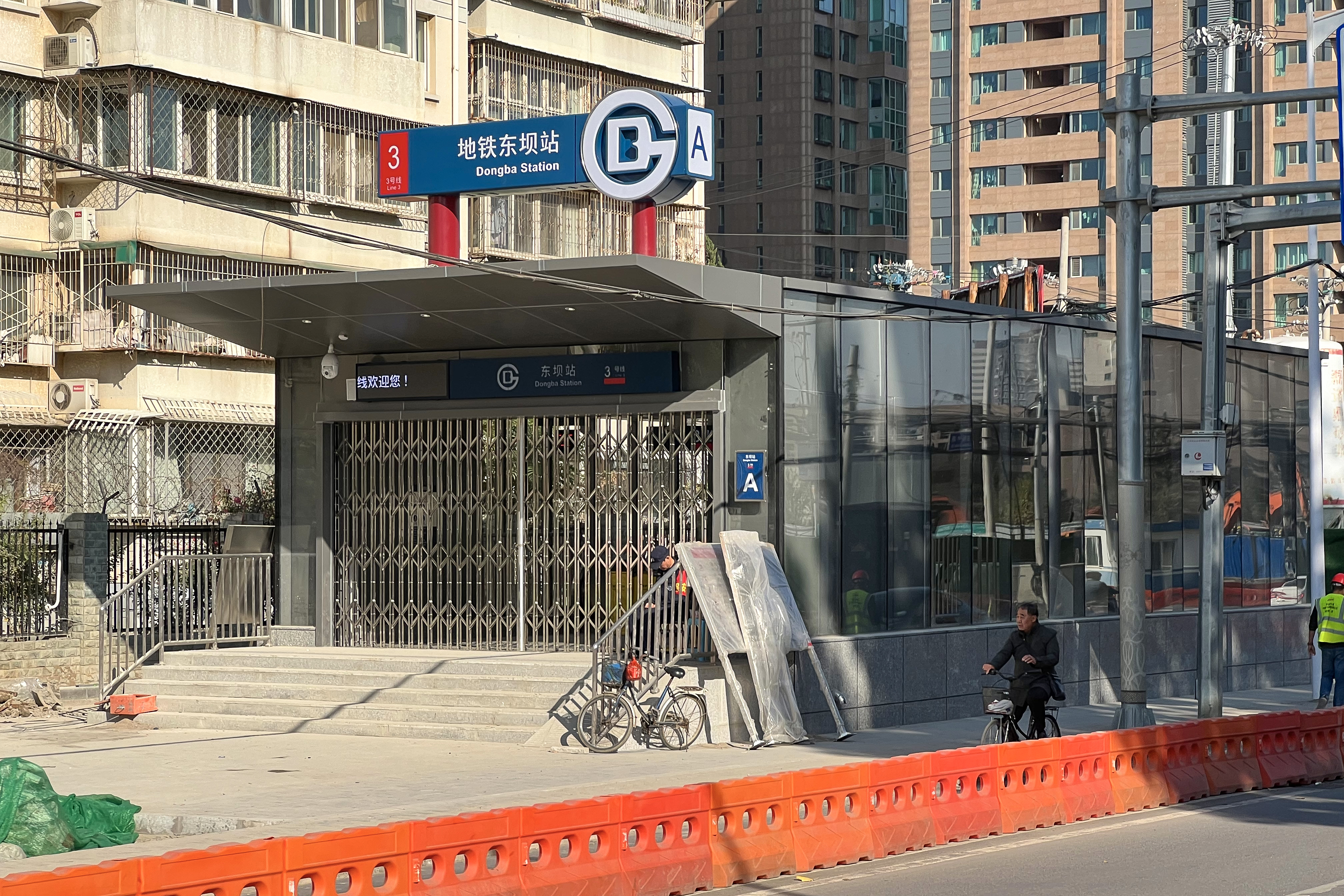
Exit A

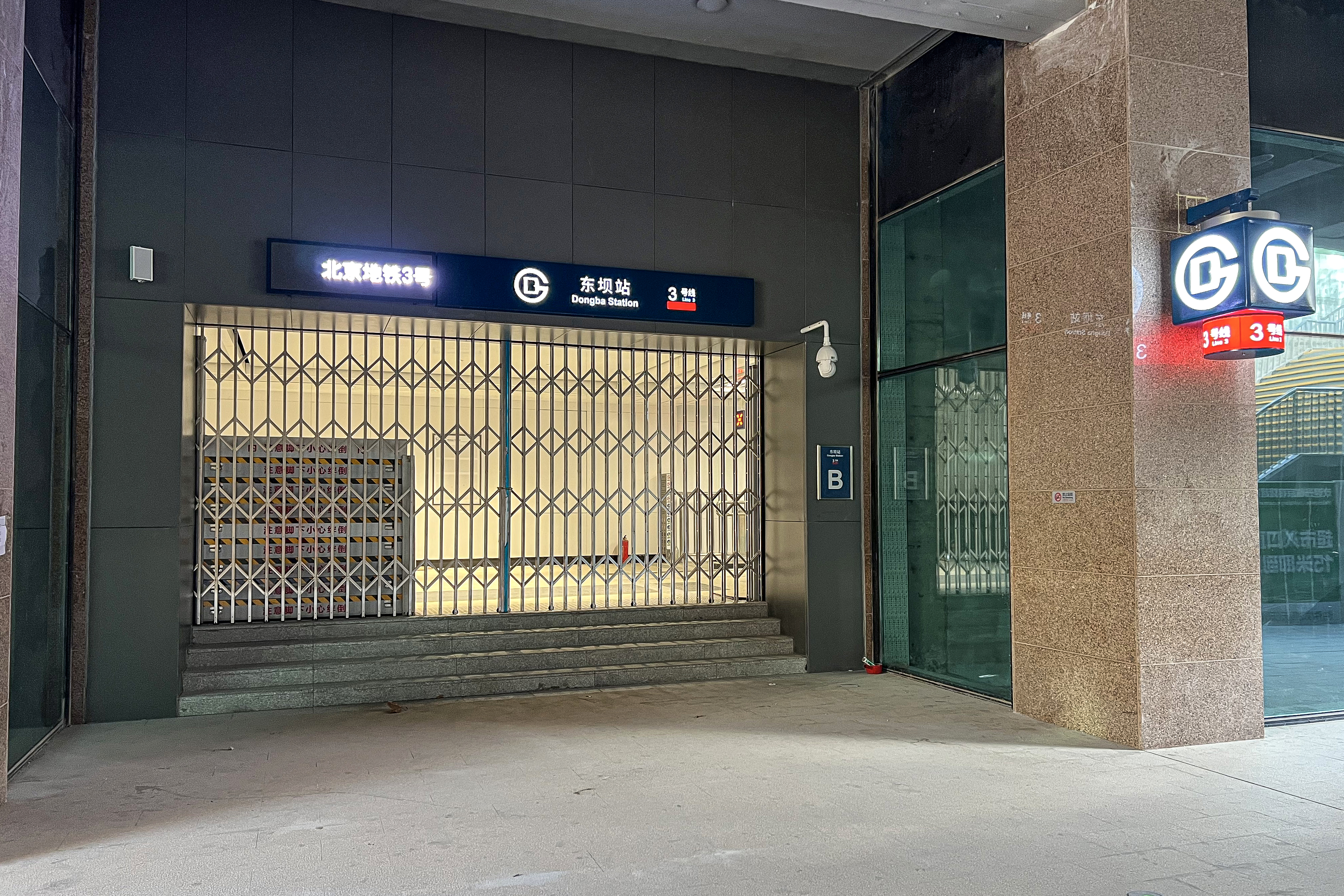
Exit B

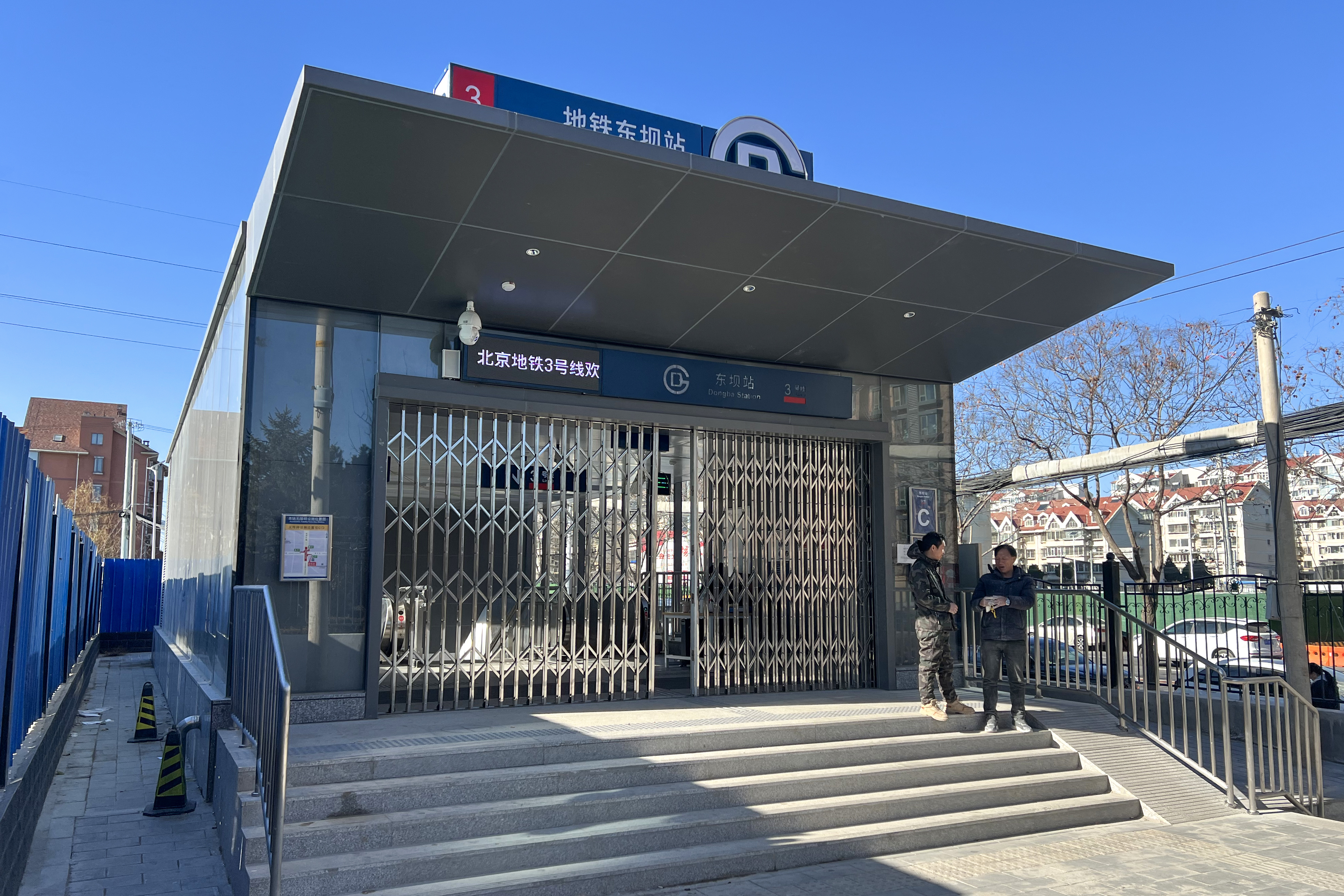
Exit C

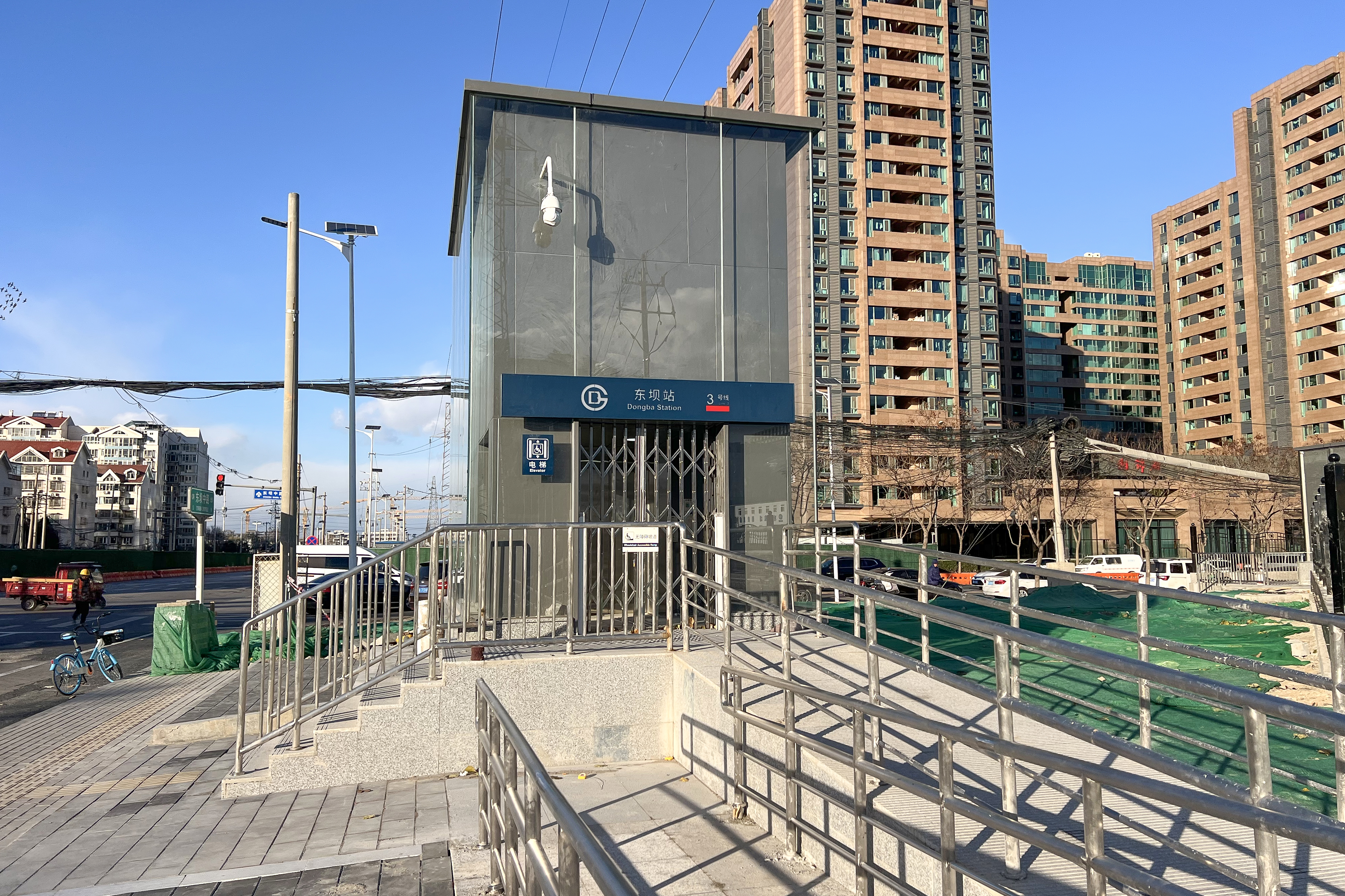
Exit C accessible exit

== History ==
The station was previously named as Dongba Zhongjie (Chinese: 东坝中街; pinyin: Dōngbà Zhōngjiē). On January 18, 2024, it was officially renamed to Dongba.
