= Hubert Trościanka =

Polish athlete

Personal information
- Born: 26 July 2006 (age 19)

Sport
- Sport: Athletics
- Event: Decathlon

Achievements and titles
- Personal bests: Decathlon: 8514 (Tampere, 2025) WU20R
Medal record
Men's athletics
Representing Poland
World U20 Championships
Silver medal – second place	2024 Lima	Decathlon
European U20 Championships
Gold medal – first place	2025 Tampere	Decathlon
European Youth Olympic Festival
Gold medal – first place	2023 Maribor	Decathlon

Hubert Trościanka (born 26 July 2006) is a Polish multi-event athlete. In August 2025, he became the world U20 record holder in the decathlon.

== Career ==
Born in 2006, Trościanka specialised in throwing events in his early career and was polish U16 champion in the discus throw, before later transitioning into multi-events. He won the decathlon at the 2023 European Youth Summer Olympic Festival in Maribor, Slovenia. He is a member of Sports Club AZS-AWF Warsaw and is coached by Marek Rzepka.

Trościanka set a Polish under-20 record with his performance at the Polish U-20 All-Around Championships in Warsaw, scoring 8145 points to break the previous record by more than 600 points.

He won the silver medal as an 18 year-old in the decathlon at the 2024 World Athletics U20 Championships in Lima, Peru in a Polish under-20 national record of 8230 points, breaking his own record. He became the first Polish athlete to win a medal in the decathlon at the World Junior Championships. His tally included personal bests efforts in the 400 metres (47.24 seconds), the 1500 metres (4:24.41) and in the long jump (7.27 metres).

=== World U20 record ===
He had to recover from knee surgery to repair his meniscus, after suffering the injury in late 2024. Competing at the 2025 European Athletics U20 Championships in Tampere, Finland, in August 2025, he took an early lead with a lifetime best of 10.74 seconds in the 100 metres. He briefly lost the lead on the first day after the high jump to Dutchman Luuk Pelkmans before regaining it at the end of the first day with a run of 46.21 seconds for the 400 metres to break the world U20 best by a decathlete, previously held by Australia's Ashley Moloney. Pelkmans regained the lead after the discus throw, but there remained only 16 points between the top-two athletes as the event moved to its final three disciplines. He regained the lead after clearing a personal best 4.80 metres in the pole vault. He then won the javelin with a championship best of 68.87m, and ran 4:28.59 for the 1500 metres. He ended the competition with the under-20 world record in the decathlon with 8514 points, breaking the previous best mark set by Niklas Kaul. In September 2025, he won the European Athletics male rising star award.

In Wrocław in January 2026, Trościanka achieved indoor personal bests of 13.93m in the shot put and 7.25m in the long jump. Unfortunately, Trościanka tore his left Achilles tendon competing in the long jump the 2026 Polish Indoor Championships.

== Personal life ==
From Szprotawa, his father Daniel's parents, Roman and Grazyna, were canoe and basketball athletes and longtime PE teachers, and his mother trained in the discus and shot put at local athletics club Uczniak Szprotawa, where Hubert joined at the age of ten years-old.
