= Dongbanan station =

Beijing Subway Line 3 station

Dongbanan 东坝南
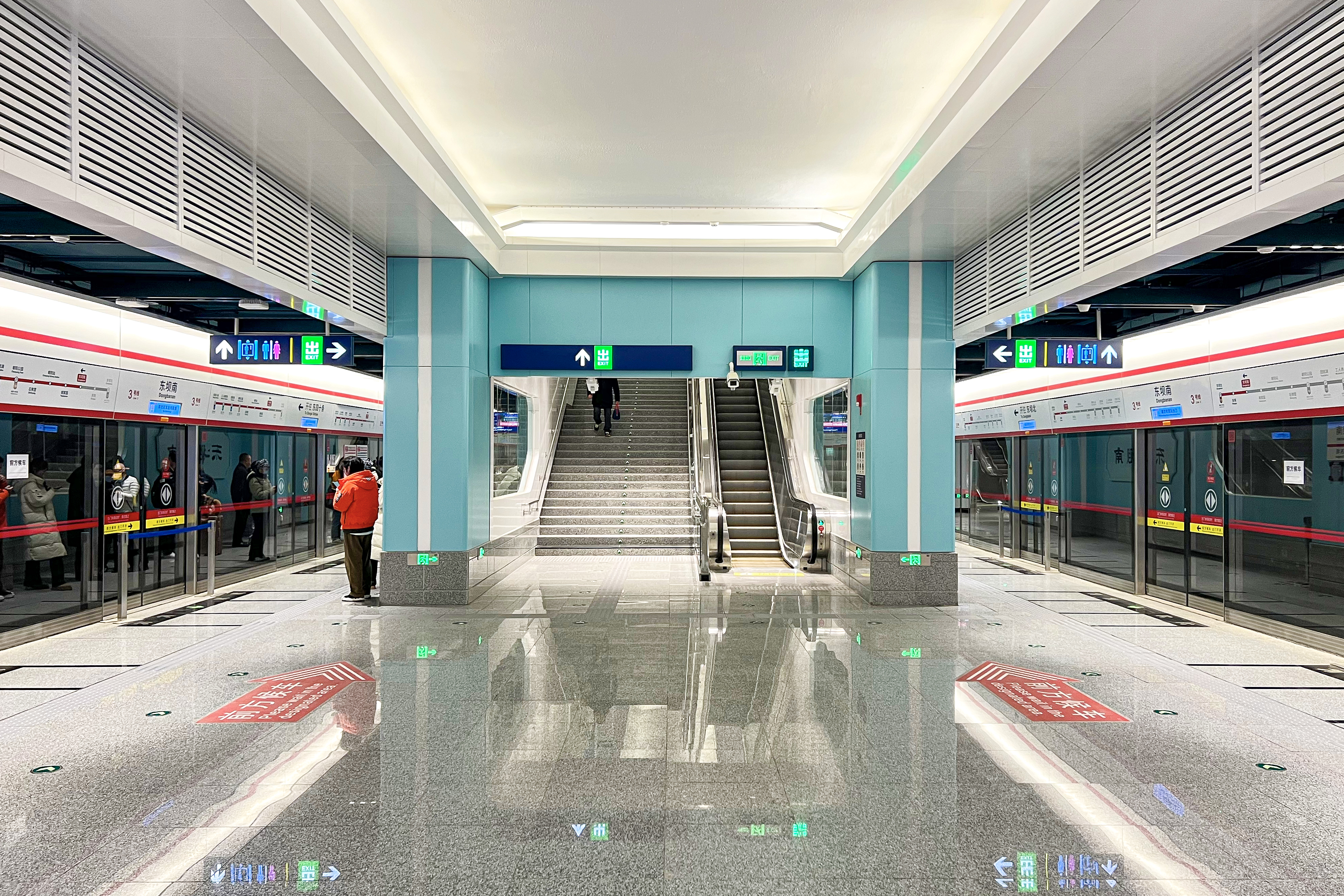
- Platform

Chinese name
- Simplified Chinese: 东坝南站
- Traditional Chinese: 東壩南站
Transcriptions
Standard Mandarin
- Hanyu Pinyin: Dōngbà Nán zhàn

General information
- Location: Intersection of Chaoxin Main Street (朝新大街) and Dongba Road Middle (东坝中路), on the border between Pingfang Area and Dongba Area; Chaoyang District, Beijing; China
- Coordinates: 39°57′04″N 116°32′28″E
- Operator: Beijing Mass Transit Railway Operation Corporation Limited
- Line: Line 3
- Platforms: 2 (1 island platform)
- Tracks: 2

Construction
- Structure type: Underground
- Accessible: Yes

History
- Opened: December 15, 2024; 20 months ago

Services
Preceding station	Beijing Subway	Following station
Yaojiayuan towards Dongsi Shitiao	Line 3	Dongba towards Dongbabei
Location
- Location within Beijing

Dongbanan station (simplified Chinese: 东坝南站; traditional Chinese: 東壩南站; pinyin: Dōngbà Nán zhàn; lit. 'Dongba South') is a subway station on Line 3 of the Beijing Subway. It opened on December 15, 2024.

== Station features ==
The station has an underground island platform.

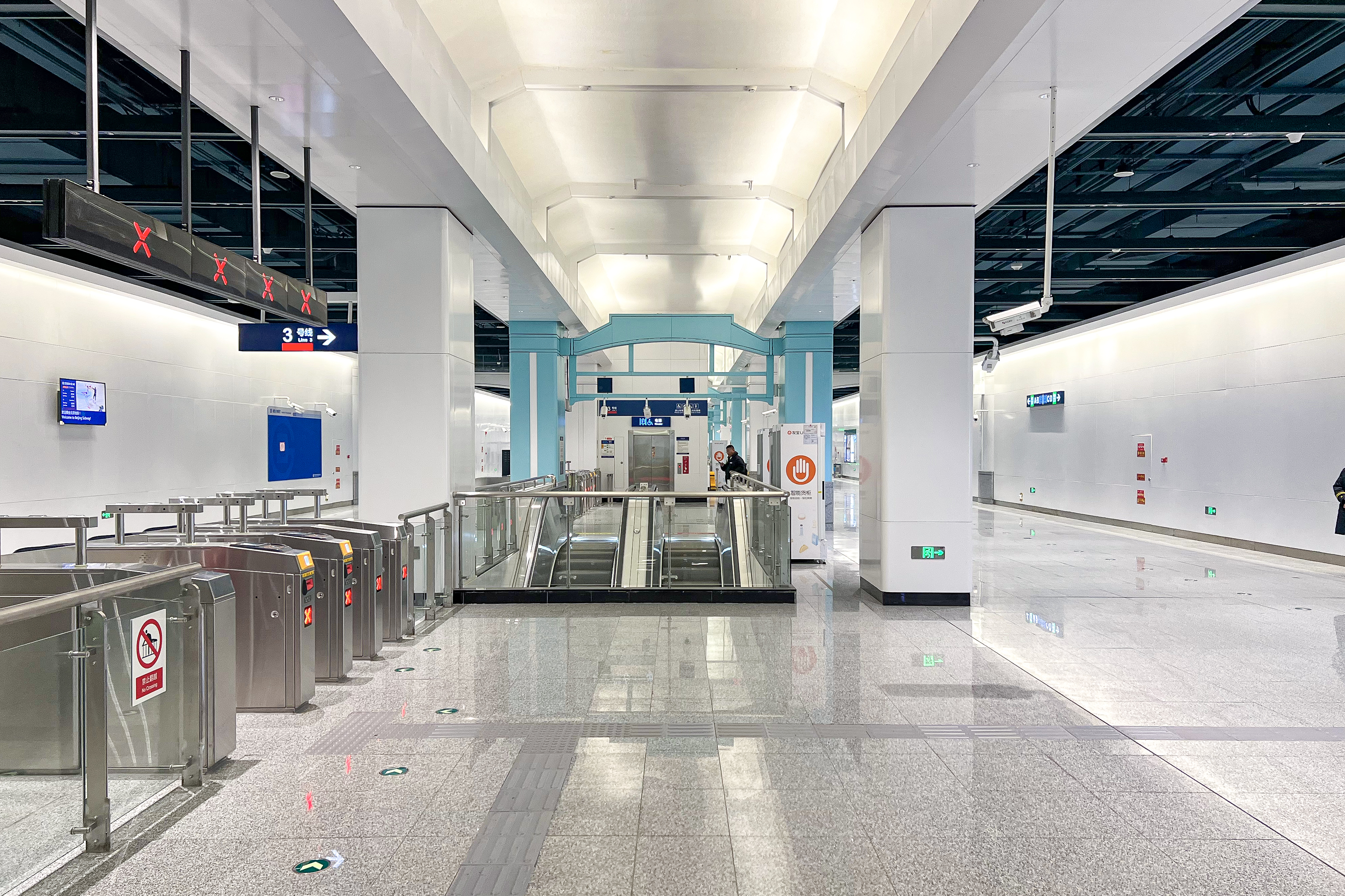

== Exits ==
There are 6 exits, lettered A, B, C1, C2, C3 and D. Exits B, C3 and D have accessible elevators.

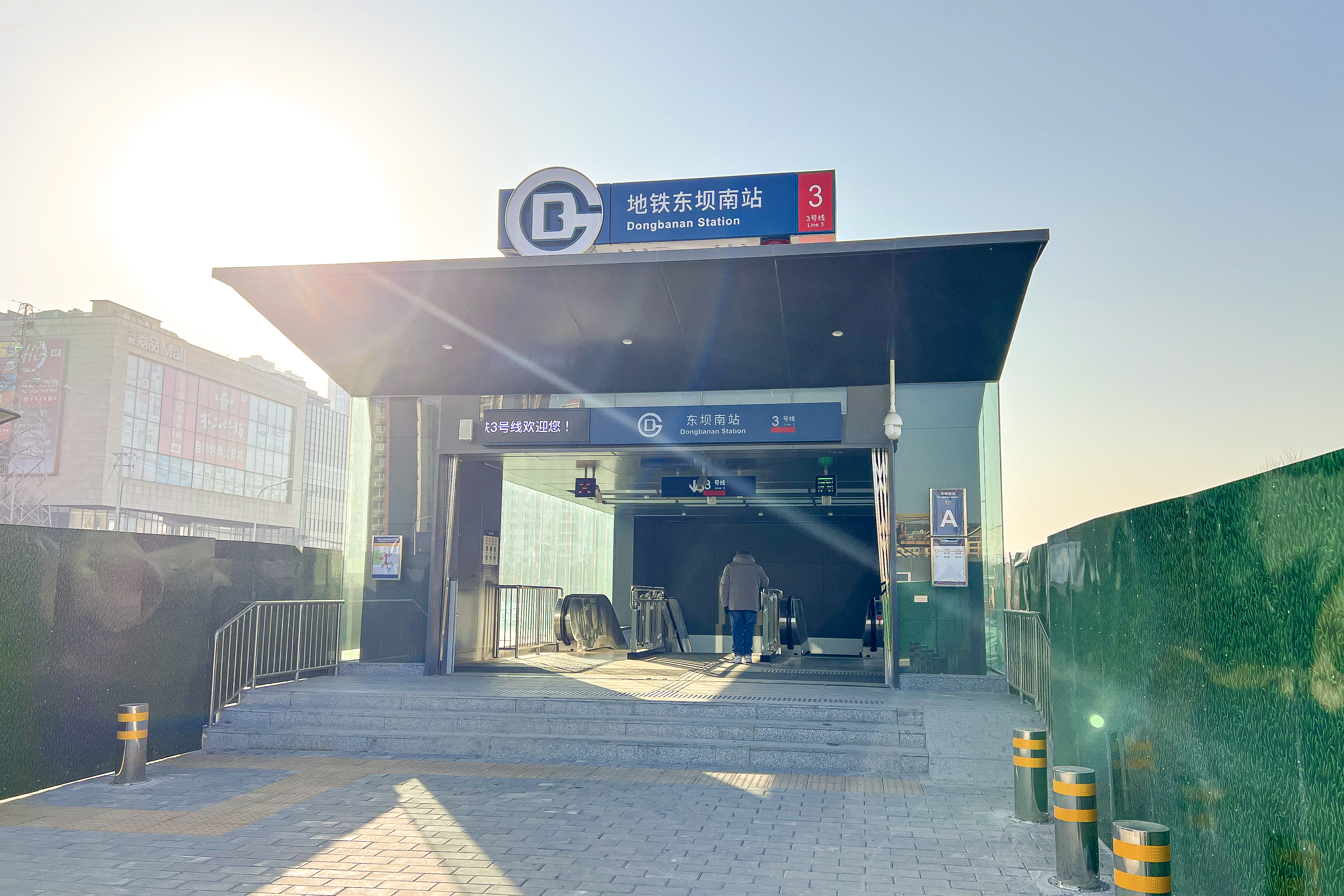
Exit A

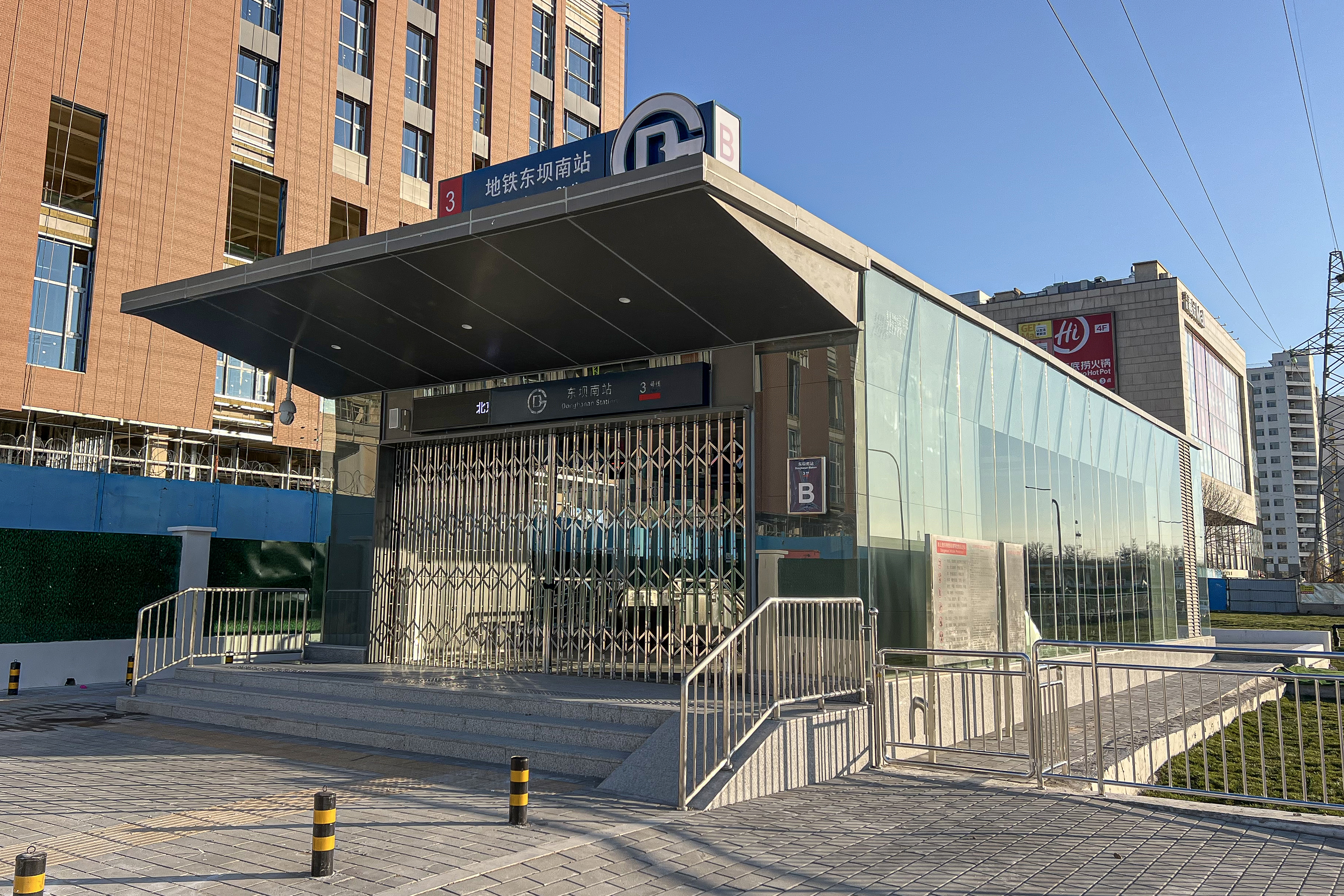
Exit B

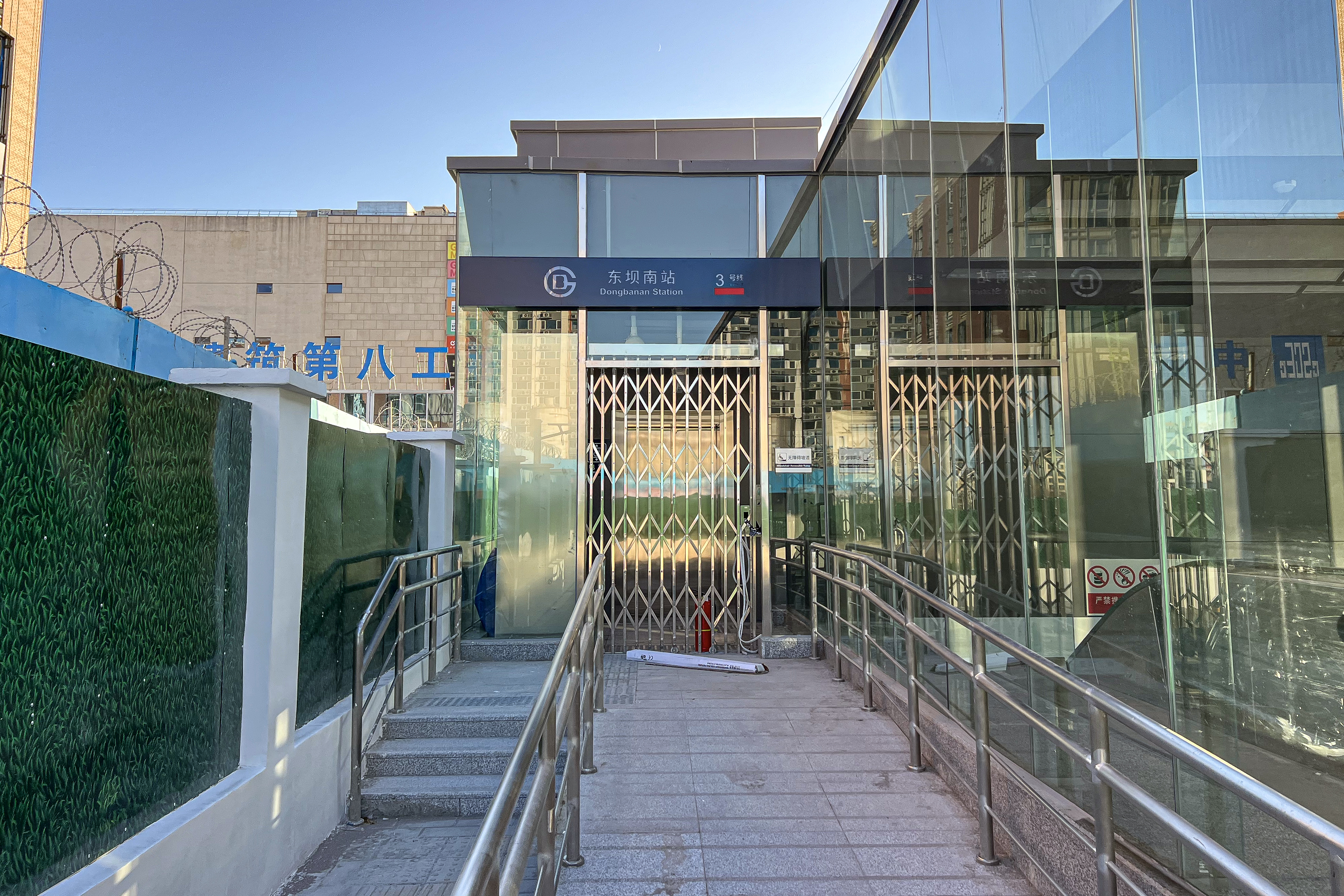
Exit B accessible exit

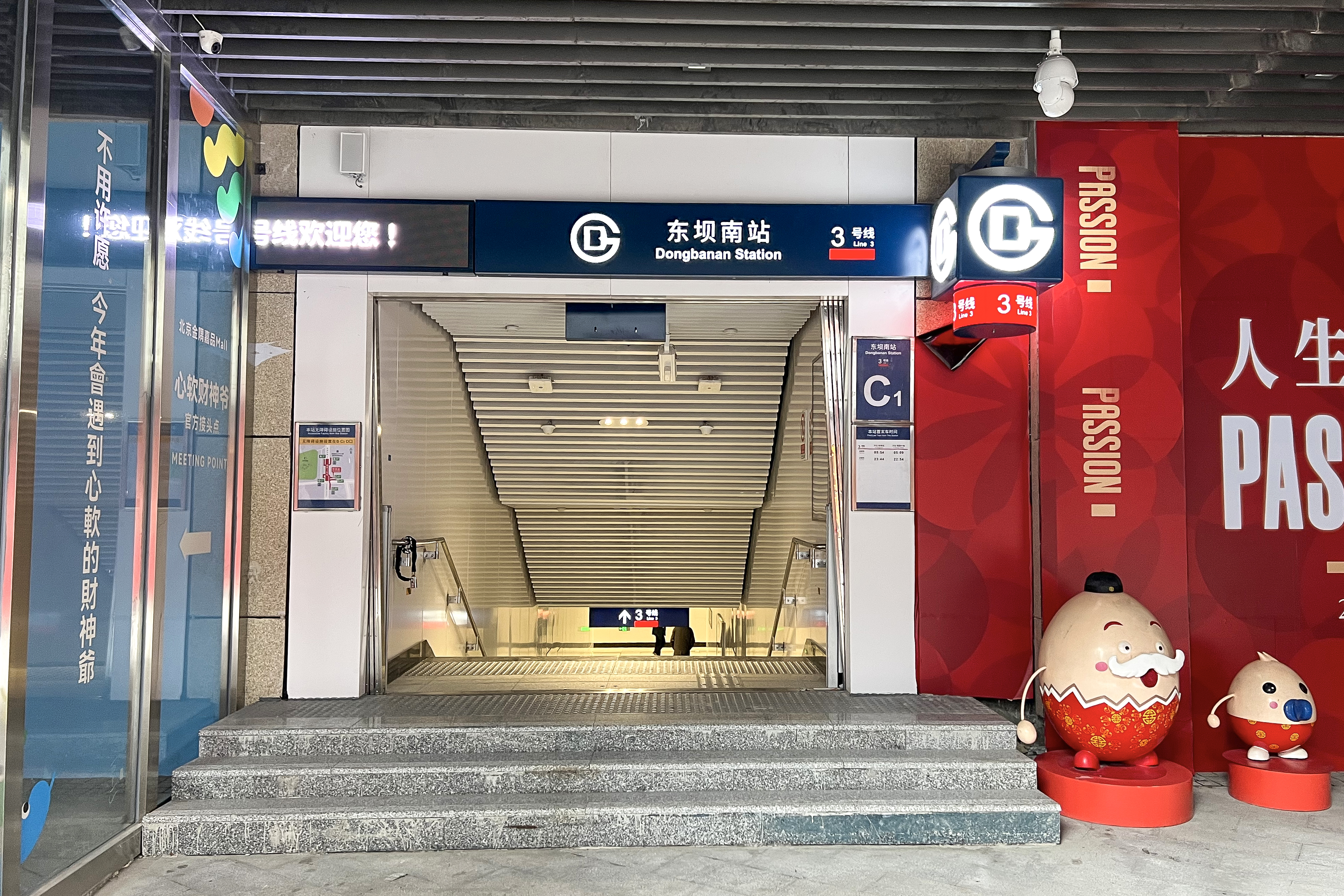
Exit C1

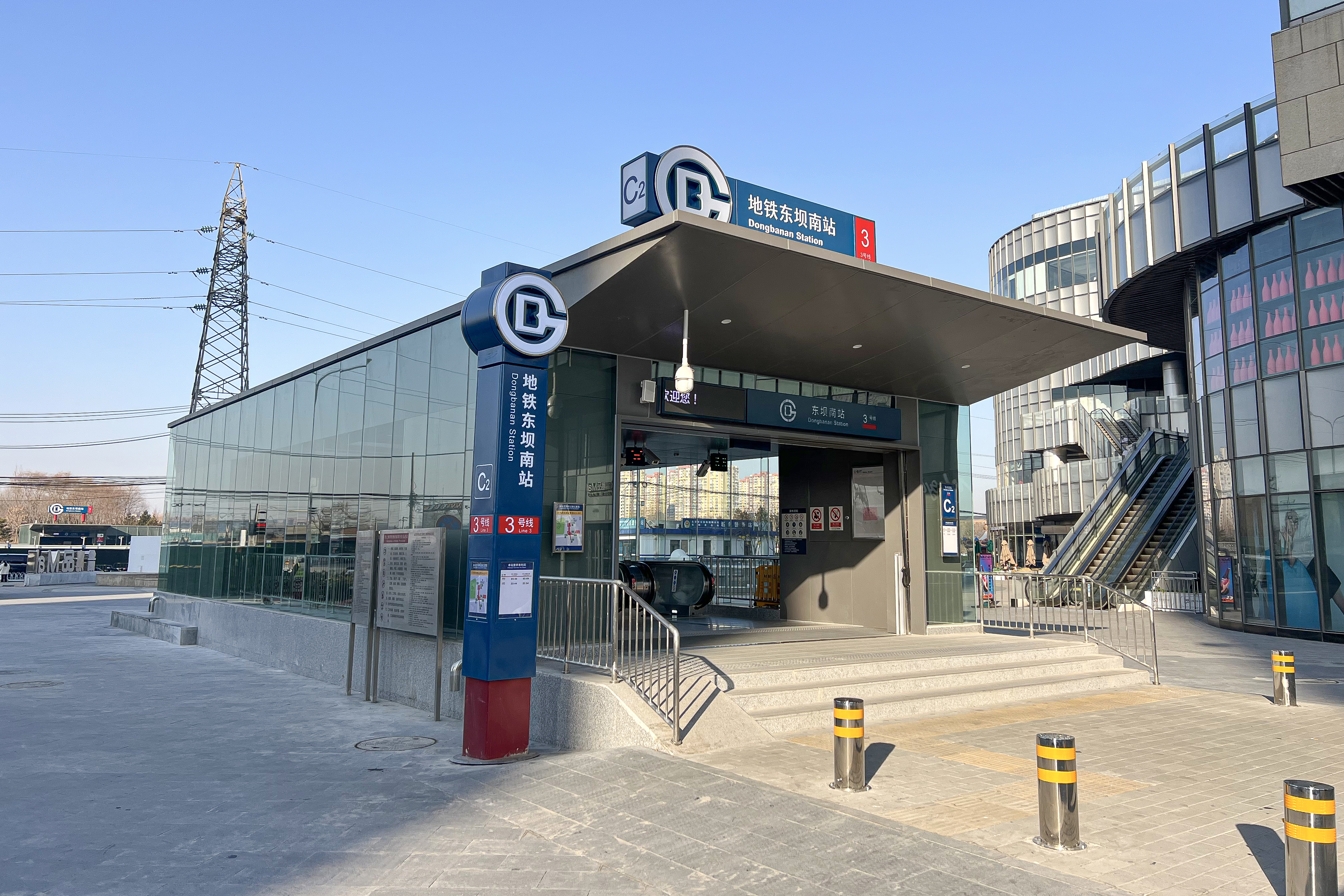
Exit C2

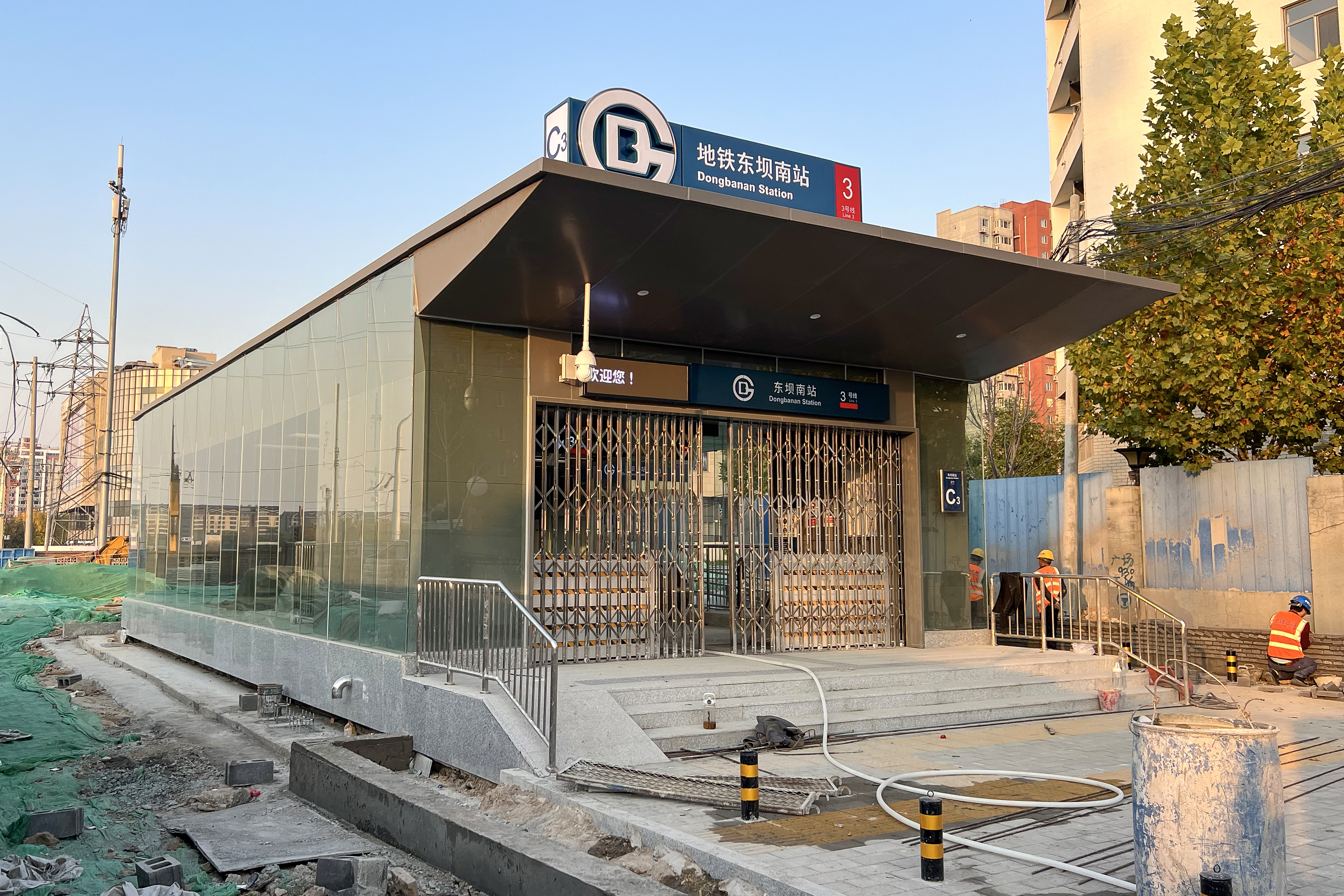
Exit C3

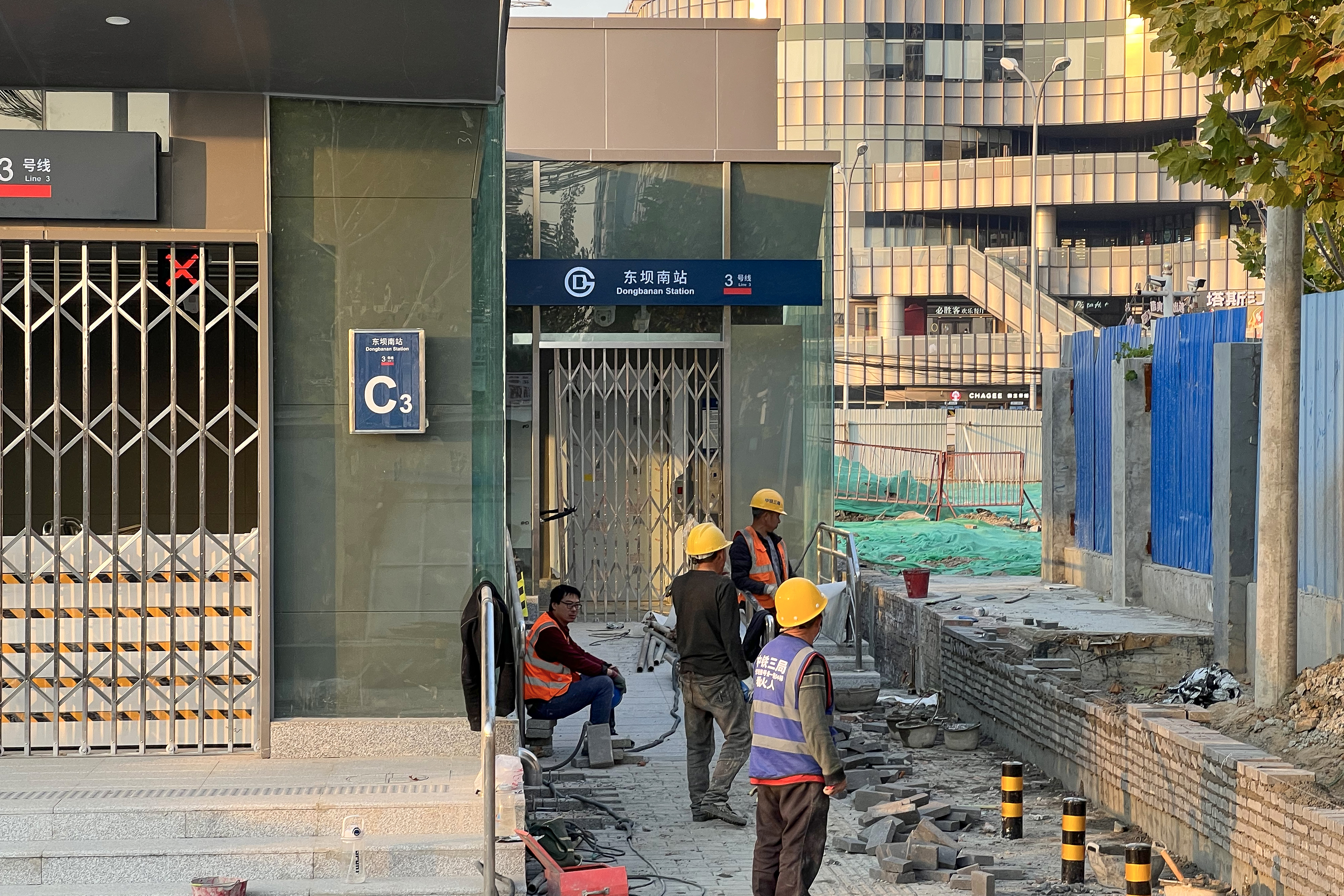
Exit C3 accessible exit

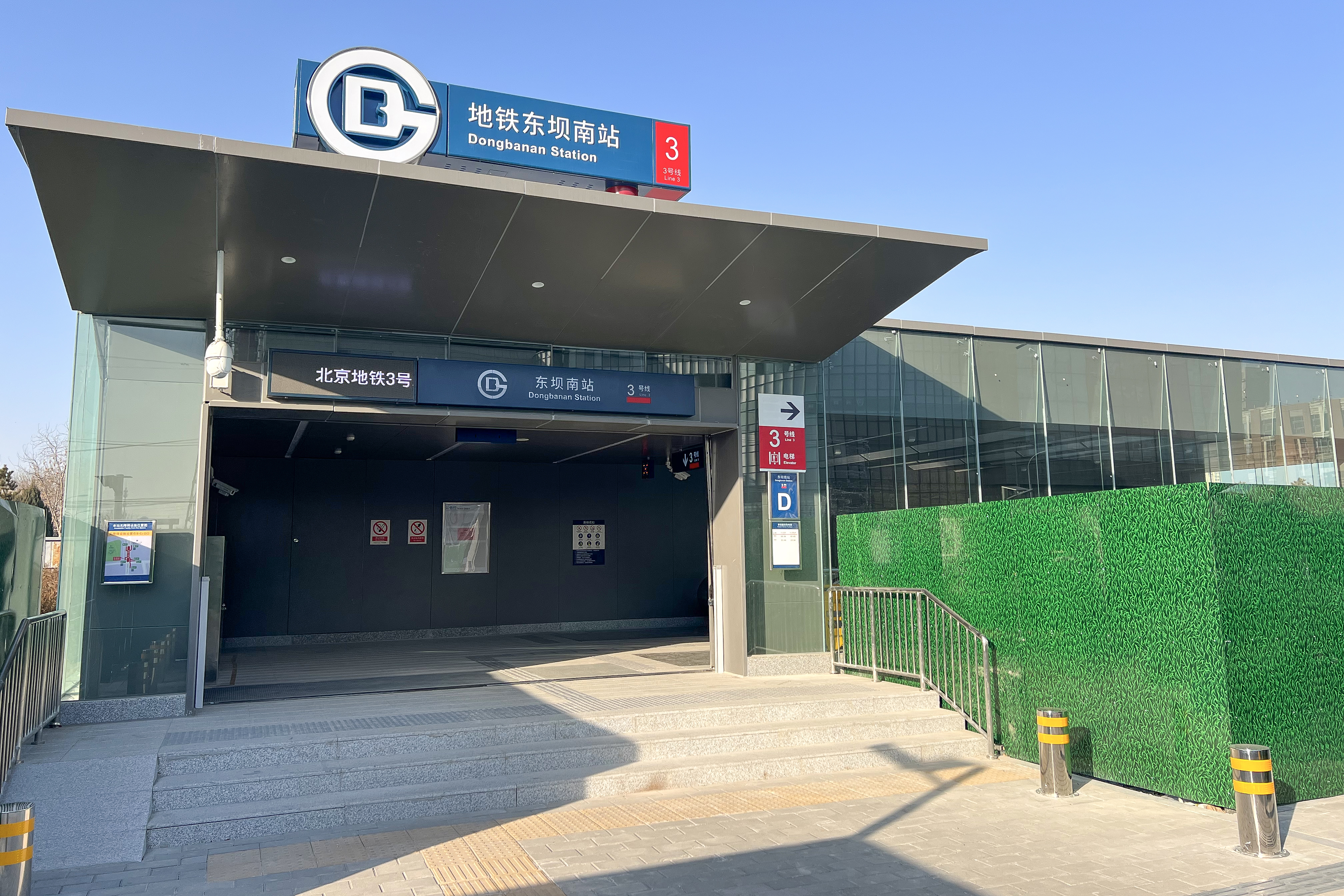
Exit D

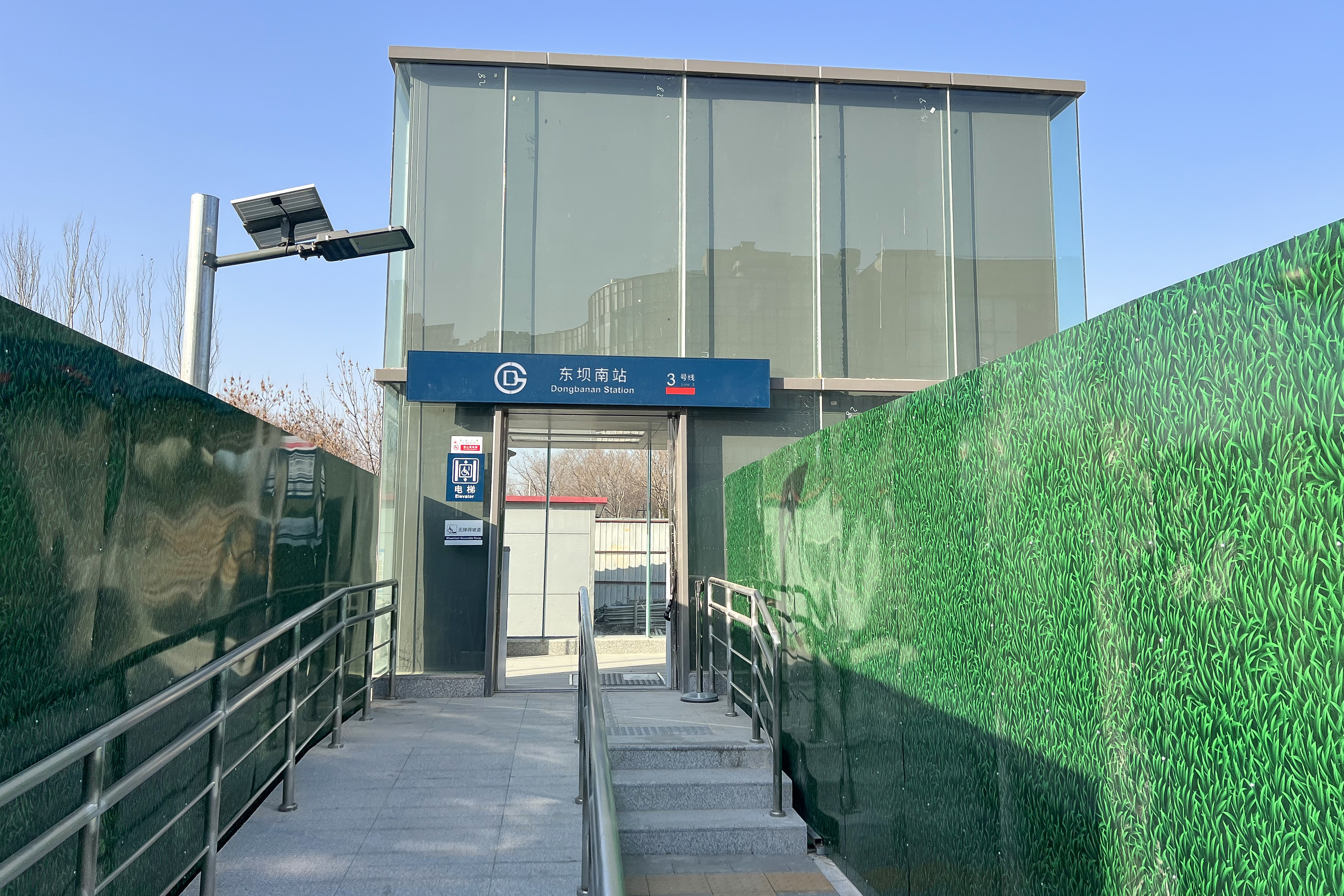
Exit D accessible exit

== History ==
The station was previously named as Pingfangcun (Chinese: 平房村; pinyin: Píngfángcūn). On January 18, 2024, it was officially renamed to Dongbanan.

== Incident ==
On the evening of August 5, 2024, a construction worker (the person in charge of the project site of the professional subcontracting unit of the upper steel structure, the main body and the attached public area decoration, the ground shaft decoration and the square in front of the station) illegally crossed the fertilizer groove between the elevator shaft platform and the foundation pit retaining wall during the steel structure hoisting and welding operation at Exit B. Due to the lack of on-site edge protection facilities, the worker fell to the bottom of the foundation pit and died after being rescued.
