= 2024 World Athletics U20 Championships – Men's decathlon =

Men's decathlon at the 2024 World Athletics U20 Championships
- Venue: Estadio Atlético de la VIDENA
- Dates: 29 August 2024; 30 August 2024
- Competitors: 27 from 19 nations
- Winning points: 8425

Medalists
gold medal	Tomas Järvinen	Czech Republic
silver medal	Hubert Trościanka	Poland
bronze medal	Florian Vriezen	Netherlands

The men's decathlon at the 2024 World Athletics U20 Championships was held at the Estadio Atlético de la VIDENA in Lima, Peru on 29 and 30 August 2024.

== Records ==
U20 standing records prior to the 2024 World Athletics U20 Championships were as follows:

Record	Athlete & Nationality	Mark	Location	Date
World U20 Record	Niklas Kaul (GER)	8435	Grosseto, Italy	23 July 2017
Championship Record	Ashley Moloney (AUS)	8190	Tampere, Finland	11 July 2018
World U20 Leading	Easton Hammond (USA)	7297	San Marcos, United States	29 March 2024

== Results ==
The highest mark recorded in each event is highlighted in yellow

Rank	Athlete	Nation	100m	LJ	SP	HJ	400m	110m H	DT	PV	JT	1500m	Points	Notes
1st place, gold medalist(s)	Tomas Järvinen	Czech Republic	10.82	7.66	13.54	2.12 SB	48.88	13.78	49.18 PB	4.60	55.79	4:29.78 PB	8425	CR
2nd place, silver medalist(s)	Hubert Trościanka	Poland	10.97	7.27 PB	14.52	1.88	47.24 PB	14.26	44.98	4.40	68.29	4:24.41 PB	8230	NU20R
3rd place, bronze medalist(s)	Florian Vriezen	Netherlands	11.15 PB	7.01 PB	13.16	1.67	47.50 PB	14.05 PB	44.90 PB	4.80 PB	59.57	4:31.41	7820	PB
4	Jonathan Hertwig-Ødegaard	Norway	11.04	6.83	14.53	1.76	48.15	13.88	42.50	4.30	54.91 PB	4:24.05 PB	7736	
5	Alexandre Montagne	France	11.22	7.29 SB	13.32	1.94	51.76	14.21	40.01	4.80 PB	56.63	4:35.74 PB	7721	PB
6	Leo Göransson	Sweden	11.13	7.13	14.30	1.88	50.00	15.36	43.96	4.50 PB	58.78	4:50.38	7583	
7	Elias Kapell	Sweden	10.84	7.21	14.04	1.79	48.14 PB	14.70	37.14	4.50	54.48 PB	4:50.22 PB	7538	PB
8	Andris Skadiņš	Latvia	11.12	7.01 PB	13.63	1.91	50.54	15.14	40.41	4.60	53.63	4:37.22 SB	7505	PB
9	Jack Whiteside	Australia	11.36	6.59	13.78	1.85 SB	49.55 PB	15.58	46.15 SB	4.40	62.64 PB	4:46.73 SB	7440	PB
10	Cédric Deillon	Switzerland	11.07	6.68	15.08	1.76	49.35	14.97	43.09	4.00	56.21	4:30.56	7437	
11	Luuk Pelkmans	Netherlands	11.57	6.94 PB	14.58	1.91	50.12 PB	14.73	44.07	4.20 PB	46.57	4:36.30	7378	
12	Dai Keïta	Belgium	11.50	6.81	13.33	1.97	50.52	15.08	41.16	4.50	47.66 PB	4:39.08 PB	7304	
13	Miks Opolais	Latvia	11.88	6.65	12.66	1.88 PB	52.68	16.19	44.23 PB	4.30	61.22	4:48.81	6991	
14	Tiago Garcia	France	11.36	6.46	13.34	1.79	50.99	14.73	37.27	4.40	48.19	4:48.22	6960	
15	Lionel Brügger	Switzerland	11.26	6.92	13.46 PB	1.76	52.27	15.73	35.63	4.40	54.55	4:48.33	6955	
16	Dario Rodriguez	Mexico	11.03	6.59 SB	13.27	1.70	49.23	14.67	34.17	4.00	41.28	4:48.27	6794	
17	Tommaso Franze'	Italy	11.50	6.81	11.43	1.79	52.45	15.14	31.92	4.70 SB	43.93	4:54.44	6663	
18	Jackson Mackay	Canada	11.40 PB	6.67	13.02 PB	2.03 PB	DQ	14.30 PB	41.68	3.90	47.22 PB	4:49.23	6405	
19	Nodir Norbaev	Uzbekistan	11.54	7.14	13.03	1.97	DQ	14.83	40.97	4.20	47.19	5:18.37	6269	SB
20	Aidan Turner	Canada	11.25	NM	12.93 SB	1.82	49.98 PB	14.55 PB	41.98 PB	4.40	28.03	5:02.55	6087	PB
21	Igor de Lima	Brazil	11.17	6.39	12.06	1.94	51.29	14.30	37.67	NM	43.48	5:24.72	6083	
22	Kenneth Byrd	United States	11.61	6.68 PB	12.23 PB	1.91	51.18	15.23	35.09	NM	39.59	5:01.07	5950	
23	Brayden Richards	United States	11.52	6.36	10.81	1.70	DQ	15.41	34.13	4.40	47.97	5:06.44	5652	
–	Imanol Egidazu	Spain	11.21	6.02	12.16	1.76	55.61	DNS					DNF	
–	Andreas Trumm	Estonia	11.36	6.49	12.51	1.73	DNS						DNF	
–	Diego Darias	Spain	11.50	6.64	12.18	DNS							DNF	
–	Ryo Takahashi	Japan	24.82	NM	DNS								DNF	
