= Tomas Järvinen =

Czech athlete

Personal information
- Nationality: Czech
- Born: 21 October 2005 (age 20)

Sport
- Sport: Athletics
- Events: Decathlon, Sprint, Long jump, High jump

Achievements and titles
- Personal bests: 100 m: 10,61 (2026); 60 m: 6,83 (2026); 400 m: 47,69 (2026); 1500 m: 4:29,78 (2024); 1000 m: 2:43,35 (2026); 110 m hurdles: 14.07 (2026); 60 m hurdles: 7,82 (2026); 110 m hurdles: 13,61 / 99cm (2024); 110 m hurdles: 14,07 (2026); Long jump: 7.77m (2024); High jump: 2.15m (2023); Pole Vault: 4.90m (2026); Javelin: 62.20m (2026); Discus: (2kg) 43.76 (2026); Discus: (1.75kg) 49.18 (2024); Shot put: (6kg) 13.66m (2024) Shot put: (7.26kg) 13.32m (2026); Decathlon: 8400 p. (2026) NU23R; Heptathlon: 6124 p. (2026) NU23R
Medal record
Men's athletics
Representing Czech Republic
World U20 Championships
Gold medal – first place	2024 Lima	Decathlon

Tomas Mikael Järvinen (born 21 October 2005) is a Czech-Finnish multi-event athlete. He won the decathlon at the 2024 World Athletics U20 Championships and set a new Czech under-23 national record at the Hypo-Meeting in 2026.

== Early life ==
He was born in the Czech Republic, but lived first few years in Finland. He relocated back to the Czech Republic when he was four years-old. He played football and tennis as a youngster before focusing on athletics during his teenage years.

== Career ==
He set a world leading U20 indoor score of 5993 points in winning the heptathlon at the Czech Indoor Championships in Prague in February 2024.

He won the gold medal at the 2024 World Athletics U20 Championships in Lima, Peru in the decathlon, with a championship record of 8425 points. This tally was 10 points lower than Niklas Kaul’s world U20 record set in 2017. The points score moved Jarvinen to second place on the world U20 all-time list. Not only did he win the overall tally, he scored rbe best marks in five out of the ten events, and set personal bests in the discus and 1500 metres. In September 2024, he was nominated for the European Athletics Rising Star award.

He competed over 400 metres at the Czech Indoor Gala in Ostrava in February 2025, running 48.77 seconds. He won the heptathlon at the 2026 Czech Indoor Championships, with a tally of 6124 points. Jarvinen scored a Czech national U23 record of 8400 points in his first completed decathlon as a senior to finish seventh overall at the Hypo-Meeting in Götzis in May. In August, he competed at the 2026 European Athletics Championships in Birmingham, England, in decathlon.

== Personal life ==
He was born in the Czech Republic to a Finnish father, Mika Järvinen, who lives in Finland, and a Czech mother, Kateřina Nekolná, who he lives with in the Czech Republic. He has dual citizenship of both countries. He is a member of Dukla Prague in the Czech Republic and is coached by Josef Karas. He is a member of Lahden Ahkera in Finland when he visits his father.
