= 1988 World Junior Championships in Athletics – Men's 20 kilometres road run =

The men's 20 kilometres road run event at the 1988 World Junior Championships in Athletics was held in Sudbury, Ontario, Canada, on 31 July.

== Medalists ==
Gold	Metaferia Zeleke; Ethiopia
Silver	Thomas Osano; Kenya
Bronze	Abel Gisemba; Kenya

== Results ==
=== Final ===
31 July

Rank	Name	Nationality	Time	Notes
1st place, gold medalist(s)	Metaferia Zeleke	Ethiopia	59:27	
2nd place, silver medalist(s)	Thomas Osano	Kenya	1:00:14	
3rd place, bronze medalist(s)	Abel Gisemba	Kenya	1:00:36	
4	Zoltán Káldy	Hungary	1:00:54	
5	Tesfayi Dadi	Ethiopia	1:00:54	
6	Valery Chesak	Soviet Union	1:02:03	
7	Boay Akonay	Tanzania	1:02:33	
8	Vanderlei de Lima	Brazil	1:02:55	
9	Ferenc Sági	Hungary	1:03:06	
10	Milan Pešava	Czechoslovakia	1:03:42	
11	Nick Tsioros	Canada	1:03:45	
12	Valdenor dos Santos	Brazil	1:03:57	
13	David De Luchi	Italy	1:04:00	
14	Patrick Chikwatu	Malawi	1:04:26	
15	Norbert Kilimiali	Tanzania	1:04:32	
16	Masaki Yamamoto	Japan	1:04:54	
17	David Angell	United States	1:05:03	
18	Carsten Arndt	West Germany	1:05:34	
19	Rocco Cantatore	Italy	1:05:52	
20	Ricardo Castaño	Spain	1:06:06	
21	Ventislav Chavdarov	Bulgaria	1:06:28	
22	Robert Lopatka	Poland	1:06:41	
23	Jonah Sixpence	Zimbabwe	1:07:03	
24	Jim Kaiser	United States	1:07:04	
25	Ross Wilson	New Zealand	1:07:27	
26	Julian Pérez	Cuba	1:07:49	
27	Paddy McCluskey	Canada	1:08:08	
28	Douglas Rountree	New Zealand	1:09:38	
29	Hussein Haleem	Maldives	1:11:34	
30	Rajan Khatri	Nepal	1:11:35	
31	Richard Rodriguez	Aruba	1:12:02	
32	Byron Salome	Netherlands Antilles	1:17:05	
	Said Lai	Djibouti	DNF	
	Franklin Tenorio	Ecuador	DNF	

== Participation ==
According to an unofficial count, 34 athletes from 25 countries participated in the event.

- Aruba (1)
- Brazil (2)
- Bulgaria (1)
- Canada (2)
- Cuba (1)
- Czechoslovakia (1)
- Djibouti (1)
- Ecuador (1)
- Ethiopia (2)
- Hungary (2)
- Italy (2)
- Japan (1)
- Kenya (2)
- Malawi (1)
- Maldives (1)
- Nepal (1)
- Netherlands Antilles (1)
- New Zealand (2)
- Poland (1)
- Soviet Union (1)
- Spain (1)
- Tanzania (2)
- United States (2)
- West Germany (1)
- Zimbabwe (1)
