= Metaferia Zeleke =

Ethiopian long-distance runner

Medal record

Men's Athletics

Representing Ethiopia

World Championships
Gold medal – first place	1988 Sudbury	20 km road run

Metaferia Zeleke (born 1971) is a former Ethiopian long-distance runner who won a gold medal at the 1988 World Junior Championships in Sudbury in the 20 km road race event.

== Achievements ==
Year	Competition	Venue	Position	Event	Notes
Representing Ethiopia
1988	World Junior Championships	Sudbury, Canada	1st	20 km	59:27
