= Maurice Gleaton =

Maurice Gleaton may refer to:

- Maurice Gleaton (musician)
- Maurice Gleaton (sprinter)
