= 2014 World Junior Championships in Athletics – Men's 200 metres =

The men's 200 metres event at the 2014 World Junior Championships in Athletics was held in Eugene, Oregon, USA, at Hayward Field on 24 and 25 July.

== Medalists ==
Gold	Trentavis Friday; United States
Silver	Ejowvokoghene Divine Oduduru; Nigeria
Bronze	Michael O'Hara; Jamaica

== Records ==
Standing records prior to the 2014 World Junior Championships in Athletics
World Junior Record	Usain Bolt (JAM)	19.93	Devonshire, Bermuda	11 April 2004
Championship Record	Andrew Howe (ITA)	20.28	Grosseto, Italy	16 July 2004
World Junior Leading	Zharnel Hughes (AIA)	20.32	Kingston, Jamaica	27 March 2014

== Results ==
=== Final ===
Wind +2.3

Place	Bib #	Athlete	Nationality	Time	Notes	React
1	1533	Trentavis Friday	United States	20.04		0.174
2	1115	Ejowvokoghene Divine Oduduru	Nigeria	20.25		0.177
3	889	Michael O’Hara	Jamaica	20.31		0.164
4	926	Yuki Koike	Japan	20.34		0.203
5	101	Zharnel Hughes	Anguilla	20.73		0.132
6	927	Masaharu Mori	Japan	20.84		0.152
7	649	Thomas Somers	United Kingdom	20.92		0.208
8	1438	Jonathan Farinha	Trinidad and Tobago	21.09		0.144

=== Semifinals ===
24 July
First 2 in each heat (Q) and the next 2 fastest (q) advance to the Final

==== Summary ====
Rank	Name	Nationality	Time	Notes
1	Trentavis Friday	United States	20.35 (w: +1.8 m/s)	Q
2	Thomas Somers	United Kingdom	20.37 (w: +1.9 m/s)	Q PB
3	Zharnel Hughes	Anguilla	20.38 (w: +1.9 m/s)	Q
4	Michael O'Hara	Jamaica	20.45 (w: +1.3 m/s)	Q PB
5	Ejowvokoghene Divine Oduduru	Nigeria	20.66 (w: +1.3 m/s)	Q PB
5	Yuki Koike	Japan	20.66 (w: +1.8 m/s)	Q
7	Masaharu Mori	Japan	20.71 (w: +1.9 m/s)	q PB
8	Jonathan Farinha	Trinidad and Tobago	20.74 (w: +1.9 m/s)	q
9	Emmanuel Dasor	Ghana	20.75 (w: +1.3 m/s)	PB
10	Jevaughn Minzie	Jamaica	20.77 (w: +1.9 m/s)	
11	Reynier Mena	Cuba	20.81 (w: +1.3 m/s)	
12	Steven Gardiner	Bahamas	20.89 (w: +1.8 m/s)	
13	Andre Azonwanna	Canada	20.90 (w: +1.3 m/s)	PB
14	Jacopo Spanò	Italy	20.98 (w: +1.8 m/s)	PB
15	Morten Dalgaard Madsen	Denmark	21.06 (w: +1.8 m/s)	NJR
16	Kendal Williams	United States	21.10 (w: +1.9 m/s)	
17	Baboloki Thebe	Botswana	21.28 (w: +1.9 m/s)	
18	Miguel Francis	Antigua and Barbuda	21.29 (w: +1.8 m/s)	
19	Jakub Matúš	Slovakia	21.33 (w: +1.8 m/s)	PB
20	Iván Moreno	Mexico	21.37 (w: +1.3 m/s)	
21	Luka Janežič	Slovenia	21.41 (w: +1.9 m/s)	
22	Karabo Mothibi	Botswana	21.54 (w: +1.3 m/s)	
	Vítor Hugo dos Santos	Brazil	DQ	163.3(a)
	Michael Songore	Zimbabwe	DNS	

==== Details ====
First 2 in each heat (Q) and the next 2 fastest (q) advance to the Final

===== Semifinal 1 =====
25 July
Start time: 18:38 Temperature: 23 °C Humidity: 44 %
Wind: +1.9 m/s

Rank	Name	Nationality	Lane	Reaction Time	Time	Notes
1	Thomas Somers	United Kingdom	6	0.188	20.37	Q PB
2	Zharnel Hughes	Anguilla	3	0.159	20.38	Q
3	Masaharu Mori	Japan	8	0.170	20.71	q PB
4	Jonathan Farinha	Trinidad and Tobago	5	0.188	20.74	q
5	Jevaughn Minzie	Jamaica	4	0.194	20.77	
6	Kendal Williams	United States	1	0.212	21.10	
7	Baboloki Thebe	Botswana	7	0.207	21.28	
8	Luka Janežič	Slovenia	2	0.168	21.41	

===== Semifinal 2 =====
25 July
Start time: 18:44 Temperature: 23 °C Humidity: 44 %
Wind: +1.3 m/s

Rank	Name	Nationality	Lane	Reaction Time	Time	Notes
1	Michael O'Hara	Jamaica	4	0.248	20.45	Q PB
2	Ejowvokoghene Divine Oduduru	Nigeria	5	0.191	20.66	Q PB
3	Emmanuel Dasor	Ghana	6	0.192	20.75	PB
4	Reynier Mena	Cuba	3	0.145	20.81	
5	Andre Azonwanna	Canada	8	0.188	20.90	PB
6	Iván Moreno	Mexico	1	0.170	21.37	
7	Karabo Mothibi	Botswana	2	0.159	21.54	
	Vítor Hugo dos Santos	Brazil	7	0.181	DQ	163.3(a)

Note:
IAAF Rule 163.3(a) - Lane infringement

===== Semifinal 3 =====
25 July
Start time: 18:53 Temperature: 23 °C Humidity: 44 %
Wind: +1.8 m/s

Rank	Name	Nationality	Lane	Reaction Time	Time	Notes
1	Trentavis Friday	United States	3	0.179	20.35	Q
2	Yuki Koike	Japan	4	0.177	20.66	Q
3	Steven Gardiner	Bahamas	5	0.166	20.89	
4	Jacopo Spanò	Italy	6	0.194	20.98	PB
5	Morten Dalgaard Madsen	Denmark	8	0.163	21.06	NJR
6	Miguel Francis	Antigua and Barbuda	1	0.229	21.29	
7	Jakub Matúš	Slovakia	2	0.153	21.33	PB
	Michael Songore	Zimbabwe	7		DNS	

=== Heats ===
24 July
First 2 in each heat (Q) and the next 6 fastest (q) advance to the Semi-Finals

==== Summary ====
Rank	Name	Nationality	Time	Notes
1	Thomas Somers	United Kingdom	20.60 (w: +1.0 m/s)	Q PB
1	Trentavis Friday	United States	20.60 (w: +0.7 m/s)	Q
3	Michael O'Hara	Jamaica	20.62 (w: +0.6 m/s)	Q
4	Emmanuel Dasor	Ghana	20.75 (w: +0.1 m/s)	Q PB
5	Jevaughn Minzie	Jamaica	20.84 (w: +1.0 m/s)	Q
6	Zharnel Hughes	Anguilla	20.87 (w: -0.1 m/s)	Q
7	Ejowvokoghene Divine Oduduru	Nigeria	20.89 (w: +0.6 m/s)	Q
8	Jacopo Spanò	Italy	21.04 (w: +0.1 m/s)	Q PB
9	Steven Gardiner	Bahamas	21.10 (w: -0.3 m/s)	Q
9	Yuki Koike	Japan	21.10 (w: -0.8 m/s)	Q
11	Jonathan Farinha	Trinidad and Tobago	21.11 (w: -0.2 m/s)	Q
12	Masaharu Mori	Japan	21.16 (w: -0.1 m/s)	Q
12	Kendal Williams	United States	21.16 (w: +0.1 m/s)	q
14	Morten Dalgaard Madsen	Denmark	21.21 (w: +0.7 m/s)	Q PB
15	Reynier Mena	Cuba	21.24 (w: -0.6 m/s)	Q
15	Miguel Francis	Antigua and Barbuda	21.24 (w: +0.6 m/s)	q
17	Andre Azonwanna	Canada	21.25 (w: -0.3 m/s)	Q
18	Vítor Hugo dos Santos	Brazil	21.33 (w: -0.2 m/s)	Q
18	Iván Moreno	Mexico	21.33 (w: +0.7 m/s)	q PB
18	Karabo Mothibi	Botswana	21.33 (w: +1.0 m/s)	q PB
21	Luka Janežič	Slovenia	21.35 (w: +0.6 m/s)	q PB
22	Jakub Matúš	Slovakia	21.36 (w: -0.1 m/s)	q PB
22	Fatih Aktas	Turkey	21.36 (w: -0.2 m/s)	
24	Baboloki Thebe	Botswana	21.37 (w: -0.8 m/s)	Q
24	Gabriel Constantino	Brazil	21.37 (w: +0.7 m/s)	
26	Liang Jinsheng	China	21.39 (w: +1.0 m/s)	
27	Bálint Móricz	Hungary	21.41 (w: +0.6 m/s)	
28	James Kermond	Australia	21.43 (w: -0.2 m/s)	
29	Kolbeinn Höður Gunnarsson	Iceland	21.44 (w: -0.3 m/s)	
29	Stanley del Carmen	Dominican Republic	21.44 (w: +0.6 m/s)	
31	Ian Kerr	Bahamas	21.45 (w: +0.7 m/s)	
32	Chris Stone	United Kingdom	21.47 (w: -0.1 m/s)	
32	Paisios Dimitriadis	Cyprus	21.47 (w: -0.2 m/s)	PB
34	Ousman Touray	Norway	21.49 (w: -0.8 m/s)	
34	Yaniel Carrero	Cuba	21.49 (w: -0.3 m/s)	
36	Jonathan Quarcoo	Norway	21.50 (w: +1.0 m/s)	
37	Samuli Samuelsson	Finland	21.53 (w: -0.3 m/s)	
38	Ryan Bedford	Australia	21.55 (w: +0.6 m/s)	
39	Aykut Ay	Turkey	21.57 (w: +1.0 m/s)	
40	Brian Kasinda	Zambia	21.58 (w: +0.1 m/s)	
40	Marcus Lawler	Ireland	21.58 (w: -0.8 m/s)	
42	Jóhann Björn Sigurbjörnsson	Iceland	21.59 (w: +0.1 m/s)	
43	Mobolade Ajomale	Canada	21.60 (w: -0.8 m/s)	
44	Eckhardt Rossouw	South Africa	21.61 (w: +0.7 m/s)	
45	Juander Santos	Dominican Republic	21.62 (w: -0.2 m/s)	
46	Levi Roche Mandji	Italy	21.63 (w: -0.1 m/s)	
47	Geoffrey Kiprotich Rono	Kenya	21.65 (w: +0.7 m/s)	
48	Michael Songore	Zimbabwe	21.68 (w: -0.6 m/s)	Q
49	Jon Seeliger	South Africa	21.70 (w: -0.6 m/s)	
50	Huang Shu-Wei	Chinese Taipei	21.73 (w: -0.1 m/s)	
51	Park Chan-Yang	South Korea	21.76 (w: -0.2 m/s)	
51	Kyle Webb	Bermuda	21.76 (w: +1.0 m/s)	
53	Zak Irwin	Ireland	21.78 (w: -0.6 m/s)	
54	Julius Rivera	Puerto Rico	21.80 (w: -0.8 m/s)	
55	Roberto Luévano	Mexico	21.83 (w: -0.1 m/s)	
56	Silvan Wicki	Switzerland	21.86 (w: -0.6 m/s)	
57	Himasha Eashan Waththakankanamge	Sri Lanka	21.88 (w: +0.1 m/s)	
57	Ricardo Pereira	Portugal	21.88 (w: -0.8 m/s)	
59	Reuberth Boyde	Saint Vincent and the Grenadines	22.09 (w: +0.1 m/s)	
60	Arturo Deliser	Panama	22.11 (w: -0.3 m/s)	
61	Amanuel Abebe	Ethiopia	22.19 (w: -0.3 m/s)	
62	Ismael Tjiramba	Namibia	22.20 (w: -0.2 m/s)	SB
63	Ali Rashid Salim Al-Marjabi	Oman	22.28 (w: -0.6 m/s)	
64	Wesly Chery	Turks and Caicos Islands	22.29 (w: +0.1 m/s)	PB
65	Muhammad Asad ur Rehman Khan	Pakistan	22.55 (w: -0.8 m/s)	PB
	George Molisingi	Vanuatu	DQ	163.3(a)
	Rosel Lusanga Kafwa	DR Congo	DNS	
	Tega Odele	Nigeria	DNS	

==== Details ====
First 2 in each heat (Q) and the next 6 fastest (q) advance to the Semi-Finals

===== Heat 1 =====
25 July
Start time: 10:44 Temperature: 16 °C Humidity: 68 %
Wind: -0.8 m/s

Rank	Name	Nationality	Lane	Reaction Time	Time	Notes
1	Yuki Koike	Japan	6	0.181	21.10	Q
2	Baboloki Thebe	Botswana	8	0.206	21.37	Q
3	Ousman Touray	Norway	5	0.126	21.49	
4	Marcus Lawler	Ireland	4	0.177	21.58	
5	Mobolade Ajomale	Canada	1	0.146	21.60	
6	Julius Rivera	Puerto Rico	2	0.154	21.80	
7	Ricardo Pereira	Portugal	3	0.198	21.88	
8	Muhammad Asad ur Rehman Khan	Pakistan	7	0.187	22.55	PB

===== Heat 2 =====
25 July
Start time: 10:49 Temperature: 16 °C Humidity: 68 %
Wind: -0.1 m/s

Rank	Name	Nationality	Lane	Reaction Time	Time	Notes
1	Zharnel Hughes	Anguilla	6	0.233	20.87	Q
2	Masaharu Mori	Japan	3	0.160	21.16	Q
3	Jakub Matúš	Slovakia	8	0.182	21.36	q PB
4	Chris Stone	United Kingdom	5	0.207	21.47	
5	Levi Roche Mandji	Italy	2	0.146	21.63	
6	Huang Shu-Wei	Chinese Taipei	7	0.164	21.73	
7	Roberto Luévano	Mexico	4	0.165	21.83	

===== Heat 3 =====
25 July
Start time: 10:55 Temperature: 16 °C Humidity: 68 %
Wind: +0.7 m/s

Rank	Name	Nationality	Lane	Reaction Time	Time	Notes
1	Trentavis Friday	United States	5	0.173	20.60	Q
2	Morten Dalgaard Madsen	Denmark	8	0.183	21.21	Q PB
3	Iván Moreno	Mexico	3	0.164	21.33	q PB
4	Gabriel Constantino	Brazil	2	0.185	21.37	
5	Ian Kerr	Bahamas	7	0.223	21.45	
6	Eckhardt Rossouw	South Africa	4	0.194	21.61	
7	Geoffrey Kiprotich Rono	Kenya	6	0.176	21.65	

===== Heat 4 =====
25 July
Start time: 11:02 Temperature: 16 °C Humidity: 68 %
Wind: -0.3 m/s

Rank	Name	Nationality	Lane	Reaction Time	Time	Notes
1	Steven Gardiner	Bahamas	4	0.170	21.10	Q
2	Andre Azonwanna	Canada	3	0.180	21.25	Q
3	Kolbeinn Höður Gunnarsson	Iceland	5	0.172	21.44	
4	Yaniel Carrero	Cuba	6	0.162	21.49	
5	Samuli Samuelsson	Finland	2	0.156	21.53	
6	Arturo Deliser	Panama	7	0.168	22.11	
7	Amanuel Abebe	Ethiopia	1	0.136	22.19	
	Rosel Lusanga Kafwa	DR Congo	8		DNS	

===== Heat 5 =====
25 July
Start time: 11:08 Temperature: 16 °C Humidity: 68 %
Wind: -0.6 m/s

Rank	Name	Nationality	Lane	Reaction Time	Time	Notes
1	Reynier Mena	Cuba	5	0.168	21.24	Q
2	Michael Songore	Zimbabwe	1	0.169	21.68	Q
3	Jon Seeliger	South Africa	3	0.141	21.70	
4	Zak Irwin	Ireland	6	0.180	21.78	
5	Silvan Wicki	Switzerland	2	0.157	21.86	
6	Ali Rashid Salim Al-Marjabi	Oman	8	0.193	22.28	
	George Molisingi	Vanuatu	4	0.164	DQ	163.3(a)
	Tega Odele	Nigeria	7		DNS	

Note:
IAAF Rule 163.3(a) - Lane infringement

===== Heat 6 =====
25 July
Start time: 11:13 Temperature: 19 °C Humidity: 56 %
Wind: -0.2 m/s

Rank	Name	Nationality	Lane	Reaction Time	Time	Notes
1	Jonathan Farinha	Trinidad and Tobago	7	0.197	21.11	Q
2	Vítor Hugo dos Santos	Brazil	5	0.210	21.33	Q
3	Fatih Aktas	Turkey	6	0.229	21.36	
4	James Kermond	Australia	4	0.196	21.43	
5	Paisios Dimitriadis	Cyprus	8	0.210	21.47	PB
6	Juander Santos	Dominican Republic	1	0.203	21.62	
7	Park Chan-Yang	South Korea	3	0.216	21.76	
8	Ismael Tjiramba	Namibia	2	0.181	22.20	SB

Note:
BIB 1087 Ismael Tjiramba - Yellow Card - 162.5(b) Delaying the start

===== Heat 7 =====
25 July
Start time: 11:21 Temperature: 19 °C Humidity: 56 %
Wind: +0.6 m/s

Rank	Name	Nationality	Lane	Reaction Time	Time	Notes
1	Michael O'Hara	Jamaica	3	0.181	20.62	Q
2	Ejowvokoghene Divine Oduduru	Nigeria	8	0.178	20.89	Q
3	Miguel Francis	Antigua and Barbuda	4	0.186	21.24	q
4	Luka Janežič	Slovenia	7	0.185	21.35	q PB
5	Bálint Móricz	Hungary	5	0.276	21.41	
6	Stanley del Carmen	Dominican Republic	2	0.152	21.44	
7	Ryan Bedford	Australia	6	0.168	21.55	

===== Heat 8 =====
25 July
Start time: 11:26 Temperature: 19 °C Humidity: 56 %
Wind: +0.1 m/s

Rank	Name	Nationality	Lane	Reaction Time	Time	Notes
1	Emmanuel Dasor	Ghana	7	0.201	20.75	Q PB
2	Jacopo Spanò	Italy	8	0.183	21.04	Q PB
3	Kendal Williams	United States	4	0.189	21.16	q
4	Brian Kasinda	Zambia	5	0.195	21.58	
5	Jóhann Björn Sigurbjörnsson	Iceland	6	0.159	21.59	
6	Himasha Eashan Waththakankanamge	Sri Lanka	1	0.167	21.88	
7	Reuberth Boyde	Saint Vincent and the Grenadines	2	0.191	22.09	
8	Wesly Chery	Turks and Caicos Islands	3	0.167	22.29	PB

===== Heat 9 =====
25 July
Start time: 11:32 Temperature: 20 °C Humidity: 56 %
Wind: +1.0 m/s

Rank	Name	Nationality	Lane	Reaction Time	Time	Notes
1	Thomas Somers	United Kingdom	5	0.203	20.60	Q PB
2	Jevaughn Minzie	Jamaica	2	0.158	20.84	Q
3	Karabo Mothibi	Botswana	6	0.181	21.33	q PB
4	Liang Jinsheng	China	3	0.188	21.39	
5	Jonathan Quarcoo	Norway	8	0.173	21.50	
6	Aykut Ay	Turkey	7	0.224	21.57	
7	Kyle Webb	Bermuda	4	0.182	21.76	

== Participation ==
According to an unofficial count, 66 athletes from 48 countries participated in the event.

- Anguilla (1)
- Antigua and Barbuda (1)
- Australia (2)
- Bahamas (2)
- Bermuda (1)
- Botswana (2)
- Brazil (2)
- Canada (2)
- China (1)
- Chinese Taipei (1)
- Cuba (2)
- Cyprus (1)
- Denmark (1)
- Dominican Republic (2)
- Ethiopia (1)
- Finland (1)
- Ghana (1)
- Hungary (1)
- Iceland (2)
- Ireland (2)
- Italy (2)
- Jamaica (2)
- Japan (2)
- Kenya (1)
- Mexico (2)
- Namibia (1)
- Nigeria (1)
- Norway (2)
- Oman (1)
- Pakistan (1)
- Panama (1)
- Portugal (1)
- Puerto Rico (1)
- Saint Vincent and the Grenadines (1)
- Slovakia (1)
- Slovenia (1)
- South Africa (2)
- South Korea (1)
- Sri Lanka (1)
- Switzerland (1)
- Trinidad and Tobago (1)
- Turkey (2)
- Turks and Caicos Islands (1)
- United Kingdom (2)
- United States (2)
- Vanuatu (1)
- Zambia (1)
- Zimbabwe (1)
