= 2025 in the sport of athletics =

In 2025, multiple world records were set in the sport of athletics.

== World records ==
=== Indoor ===
Event	Perf.	N	Athlete(s)	Nat.	Date	Meeting	Location	Ctry.	R	V
Men's 3000 m sh	7:22.91		Grant Fisher	USA	8 Feb 2025	Millrose Games	New York City	USA		
Men's mile sh	3:46.63		Yared Nuguse	USA	8 Feb 2025	Millrose Games	New York City	USA		
Men's 1500 m sh	3:29.63+		Jakob Ingebrigtsen	NOR	13 Feb 2025	Meeting Hauts-de-France Pas-de-Calais	Liévin	FRA		
Men's mile sh	3:45.14		Jakob Ingebrigtsen	NOR	13 Feb 2025	Meeting Hauts-de-France Pas-de-Calais	Liévin	FRA		
Men's 5000 m sh	12:44.09		Grant Fisher	USA	15 Feb 2025	BU David Hemery Valentine Invitational	Boston	USA		
Men's 5000 m racewalk sh	17:55.65		Francesco Fortunato	ITA	22 Feb 2025	Italian Athletics Indoor Championships	Ancona	ITA		
Men's pole vault	6.27 m		Armand Duplantis	SWE	28 Feb 2025	All Star Perche	Clermont-Ferrand	FRA		

=== Outdoor ===
Event	Perf.	N	Athlete(s)	Nat.	Date	Meeting	Location	Ctry.	R	V
Men's half marathon	56:42		Jacob Kiplimo	UGA	16 Feb 2025	EDP Lisbon Half Marathon	Lisbon	POR		
Men's 20 km race walk (road)	1:16.10		Toshikazu Yamanishi	JPN	16 Feb 2025	Japanese 20km Race Walking Championships	Kobe	JPN		
Men's 35 km race walk (road)	2:21.40		Evan Dunfee	CAN	22 Mar 2025	Dudince 50	Dudince	SVK		
Men's discus throw	74.89 m		Mykolas Alekna	LTU	13 Apr 2025	Oklahoma Throws Series	Ramona	USA		
Men's discus throw	75.56 m		Mykolas Alekna	LTU	13 Apr 2025	Oklahoma Throws Series	Ramona	USA		
Women's 10 km (road)	29:27	Wo	Agnes Ngetich	KEN	26 Apr 2025	Adizero: Road to Records	Herzogenaurach	GER		
Women's marathon	2:15.50	Wo	Tigst Assefa	ETH	27 Apr 2025	London Marathon	London	GBR		
Men's 35 km race walk (road)	2:20.43		Massimo Stano	ITA	18 May 2025	European Race Walking Team Championships	Poděbrady	CZE		
Men's pole vault	6.28 m		Armand Duplantis	SWE	15 Jun 2025	BAUHAUS-galan	Stockholm	SWE		
Women's mile	4:06.91	(Note: Non-ratifiable due to the use of multiple male pace-makers)	Faith Kipyegon	KEN	26 Jun 2025	Breaking4	Paris, France	FRA		
Women's 5000 metres	13:58.06		Beatrice Chebet	KEN	5 Jul 2025	Prefontaine Classic	Eugene	USA		
Women's 1500 metres	3:48.68		Faith Kipyegon	KEN	5 Jul 2025	Prefontaine Classic	Eugene	USA		
Men's pole vault	6.29 m		Armand Duplantis	SWE	12 Aug 2025	Gyulai István Memorial	Budapest	HUN		
Men's pole vault	6.30 m		Armand Duplantis	SWE	15 Sep 2025	World Championships	Tokyo	JPN		

not ratified by World Athletics

== World leading marks ==
Best marks of the year
Event	Men			Women		
Event	Athlete	Mark	Notes	Athlete	Mark	Notes
60 metres	Lachlan Kennedy (AUS)	6.43 s	AR	Zaynab Dosso (ITA)	7.01 s	NR
100 metres	Kishane Thompson (JAM)	9.75 s		Melissa Jefferson-Wooden (USA)	10.61 s	
200 metres	Noah Lyles (USA)	19.51 s		Melissa Jefferson-Wooden (USA)	21.68 s	
400 metres	Collen Kebinatshipi (BOT)	43.53 s	NR	Sydney McLaughlin-Levrone (USA)	47.78 s	AR
800 metres	Emmanuel Wanyonyi (KEN)	1:41.44 min		Lilian Odira (KEN)	1:54.62 min	
1500 metres	Azeddine Habz (FRA)	3:27.49 min		Faith Kipyegon (KEN)	3:48.68 min	WR
Mile	Jakob Ingebrigtsen (NOR)	3:45.14 min sh	WR	Gudaf Tsegay (ETH)	4:11.88 min	NR
3000 metres	Grant Fisher (USA)	7:22.91 min sh	WR	Faith Kipyegon (KEN)	8:07.04 min	AR
5000 metres	Grant Fisher (USA)	12:44.09 min sh	WR	Beatrice Chebet (KEN)	13:58.06 min	WR
10,000 metres	Biniam Mehary (ETH)	26:43.82 min		Janeth Chepngetich (KEN)	30:27.02 min	
60 metres hurdles	Grant Holloway (USA)	7.36 s		Ditaji Kambundji (SUI)	7.67 s	AR
100/110 metres hurdles	Cordell Tinch (USA)	12.87 s		Masai Russell (USA)	12.17 s	AR
400 metres hurdles	Karsten Warholm (NOR)	46.28 s		Femke Bol (NED)	51.54 s	
3000 metres steeplechase	Soufiane El Bakkali (MAR)	8:00.70 min		Winfred Yavi (BHR)	8:45.25 min	
Half marathon	Jacob Kiplimo (UGA)	56:42 min	WR	Fotyen Tesfay (ETH)	1:03:35 h	
Marathon	Sabastian Sawe (KEN)	2:02:16 h		Hawi Feysa (ETH)	2:14:57 h	
20 kilometres race walk	Toshikazu Yamanishi (JPN)	1:16:10 h		Elvira Chepareva (RUS)	1:24:20 h	
Pole vault	Armand Duplantis (SWE)	6.30 m	WR	Amanda Moll (USA)	4.91 m	
High jump	Hamish Kerr (ITA)	2.36 m		Nicola Olyslagers (AUS)	2.04 m	AR
Long jump	Miltiadis Tentoglou (GRE)	8.46 m		Tara Davis-Woodhall (USA)	7.13 m	
Triple jump	Pedro Pichardo (POR)	17.91 m		Leyanis Pérez Hernández (CUB)	14.94 m	
Shot put	Leonardo Fabbri (ITA)	22.82 m		Chase Jackson (USA)	20.95 m	NR
Discus throw	Mykolas Alekna (LIT)	75.56 m	WR	Valarie Allman (USA)	73.52 m	AR
Javelin throw	Julian Weber (GER)	91.51 m		Victoria Hudson (AUT)	67.76 m	NR
Hammer throw	Ethan Katzberg (CAN)	84.70 m	AR	Camryn Rogers (CAN)	80.51 m	AR
Heptathlon	Sander Skotheim (NOR)	6558 pts sh	NR	Anna Hall (USA)	7032 pts	
Decathlon	Sander Skotheim (NOR)	8909 pts	NR	—		
4 × 100 metres relay	United States; Christian Coleman; Kenneth Bednarek; Courtney Lindsey; Noah Lyles	37.29 s		United States; Jacious Sears; Twanisha Terry; Kayla White; Sha'Carri Richardson	41.60 s	
4 × 400 metres relay	South Africa; Gardeo Isaacs; Udeme Okon; Leendert Koekemoer; Zakithi Nene	2:57.50 min	NR	United States; Isabella Whittaker; Lynna Irby-Jackson; Aaliyah Butler; Sydney McLaughlin-Levrone	3:16.61 min	

== Championships ==
=== World Championships ===
- 21–23 March: World Athletics Indoor Championships in (China) Nanjing
- 10–11 May: World Athletics Relays in (China) Guangzhou
- 13–21 September: World Athletics Championships in (Japan) Tokyo

=== Area, Regional and Continental Championships ===
- 2 February: European Champion Clubs Cup Cross Country in Portugal
- 15 February: Balkan Indoor Championships in (Serbia) Belgrade
- 22–23 February: South American Indoor Championships in (Bolivia) Cochabamba
- 6–9 March: European Athletics Indoor Championships in (Netherlands) Apeldoorn
- 9 March: Greek & Balkan Half Marathon Championships in (Greece) Athens
- 15 March: Central American Cross Country Championships in (Guatemala) San Jerónimo
- 15–16 March: European Throwing Cup in (Cyprus) Nicosia
- 16 March: Central American Race Walking Championships in (Guatemala) San Jerónimo
- 16 March: Asian Race Walking Championships in (Japan) Nomi
- 30 March: Asian Marathon Championships in (China) Jiaxing
- 12–13 April: European Running Championships in Belgium
- 15–18 April: Asian U18 Athletics Championships in (Saudi Arabia) Qatif
- 18 May: European Race Walking Team Championships in Czech Republic
- 24 May: European 10,000m Cup in France
- 27–31 May: Asian Athletics Championships in (South Korea) Gumi
- 27–31 May: Games of the Small States of Europe in Andorra la Vella
- 24–29 June: European Athletics Team Championships (2nd and 3rd Division) in Slovenia
- 27–29 June: European Athletics Team Championships (1st Division) in (Spain) Madrid
- 4–9 July: Pacific Mini Games in (Palau) Koror
- 6 July: Oceania Marathon Championships in (Australia) Gold Coast
- 14–18 July: African U18 and U20 Championships in (Algeria) Oran
- 17–20 July: European Athletics U23 Championships in (Norway) Bergen
- 26–27 July: Balkan Championships in (Greece) Volos
- 26–27 July: Balkan U20 Combined Events Championships in (Greece) Volos
- 7–10 August: European Athletics U20 Championships in (Finland) Tampere
- 29–31 October: Oceania Cup in (Tonga) Nukuʻalofa
- 11–16 December: Southeast Asian Games in (Thailand) Bangkok
- 14 December: European Cross Country Championships in Portugal

== World Athletics Tour events ==
=== World Athletics Indoor Tour Gold meetings ===
- 25 January: Astana Indoor Meet for Amin Tuyakov Prizes in (Kazakhstan) Astana
- 29 January: Belgrade Indoor Meeting in (Serbia) Belgrade
- 2 February: New Balance Indoor Grand Prix in (United States) Boston
- 4 February: Czech Indoor Gala in (Czech Republic) Ostrava
- 7 February: INIT Meeting Karlsruhe in (Germany) Karlsruhe
- 8 February: Millrose Games in (United States) New York City
- 13 February: Meeting Hauts-de-France Pas-de-Calais "Trophée EDF" in Liévin
- 16 February: ORLEN Copernicus Cup in (Poland) Toruń
- 28 February: World Indoor Tour Gold Madrid in (Spain) Madrid

=== World Athletics Continental Tour Gold meetings ===
- 29 March: Maurie Plant Meet in (Australia) Melbourne
- 12 April: Botswana Golden Grand Prix in Gaborone
- 18 May: Golden Grand Prix in (Japan) Tokyo
- 22–24 May: Boris Hanžeković Memorial in (Croatia) Zagreb
- 30 May: Irena Szewińska Memorial in (Poland) Bydgoszcz
- 31 May: Kip Keino Classic in (Kenya) Nairobi
- 9 June: FBK Games in (Netherlands) Hengelo
- 17 June: Paavo Nurmi Games in (Finland) Turku
- 21 June: New York City Grand Prix in (United States) New York City
- 24 June: Ostrava Golden Spike in (Czech Republic) Ostrava
- 12 August: Gyulai István Memorial in (Hungary) Budapest
- 7 September: World Athletics Continental Tour - Beijing in (China) Beijing

=== World Athletics Combined Events Tour Gold meetings ===
- 31 May–1 June: Hypomeeting in (Austria) Götzis
- 21 June: Meeting Arona Pruebas Combinadas in (Spain) Arona
- 5–6 July: Décastar in (France) Talence
- 26–27 July: Wiesław Czapiewski Memorial in (Poland) Nakło nad Notecią

== Circuit events ==
=== Diamond League ===
- 26 April: Xiamen Diamond League in (China) Xiamen
- 3 May: Yangtze Delta Athletics Diamond Gala in (China) Keqiao
- 16 May: Doha Meeting in (Qatar) Doha
- 25 May: Meeting International Mohammed VI d'Athlétisme de Rabat in (Morocco) Rabat
- 6 June: Golden Gala Pietro Mennea in (Italy) Rome
- 12 June: Bislett Games in (Norway) Oslo
- 15 June: BAUHAUS-galan in (Sweden) Stockholm
- 20 June: Meeting de Paris in (France) Paris
- 5 July: Prefontaine Classic in (United States) Eugene
- 11 July: Herculis EBS in (Monaco) Fontvieille
- 19 July: London Athletics Meet in (United Kingdom) London
- 16 August: Kamila Skolimowska Memorial in (Poland) Chorzów
- 20 August: Athletissima in (Switzerland) Lausanne
- 22 August: AG Memorial Van Damme in (Belgium) Brussels
- 27-28 August: Weltklasse Zürich in (Switzerland) Zürich

=== Grand Slam Track ===
- 4–6 April: Kingston Slam (Jamaica) Kingston
- 2–4 May: Miami Slam in (United States) Miramar
- 30 May–1 June: Philadelphia Slam in (United States) Philadelphia
- 27–29 June: Los Angeles Slam in (United States) Los Angeles

=== World Marathon Majors ===
- 2 March: Tokyo Marathon in (Japan) Tokyo
- 21 April: Boston Marathon in (United States) Boston
- 27 April: London Marathon in (United Kingdom) London
- 31 August: Sydney Marathon in (Australia) Sydney
- 21 September: Berlin Marathon in (Germany) Berlin
- 12 October: Chicago Marathon in (United States) Chicago
- 2 November: New York Marathon in (United States) New York City
