= Maurice Gleaton (sprinter) =

American sprinter (born 2006)

Maurice Gleaton Jr.
Personal information
- Born: November 26, 2006 (age 19)

Sport
- Sport: Athletics
- Event: Sprint

Achievements and titles
- Personal bests: 60 m: 6.55 (Albuquerque, 2026); 100m: 9.92 s (Eugene, 2025): 200 m: 20.52 (Georgia, 2023)

Maurice Gleaton Jr. (born November 26, 2006) is an American sprinter. In 2025, whilst still a high school student, he broke the 10-second barrier for the 100 metres.

== Early life ==
He attended Langston Hughes High School in South Fulton, Georgia, where he played as a wide receiver as well as competing in track and field. Before he graduated high school in 2025, he committed to attend the University of Georgia.

== Career ==
In 2023, as a 16-year-old, Gleaton won the Nike Outdoor Nationals High School Championships in the 200 metres, and he was runner-up in the 100 metres. That year, he ran American 10th-grade high school record times of 10.14 seconds for the 100 metres and 20.52 seconds for the 200 metres. In 2024, he won both the 100 metres and 200 metres at the Nike Outdoor Nationals High School Championships.

He ran 10.01 seconds for the 100 metres in March 2025 in Jacksonville, Florida. He lowered his own Georgia state high school record to a time of 9.98 seconds (m/s +0.0) at the GHSA 5A Region 3 Meet in April 2025 to set the second-fastest wind-legal time in American high school history, behind Christian Miller.

In June 2025, he ran a wind-assisted 9.82s seconds (+2.8 m/s) to win the men's 100m at the Star Athletics Sprint Series in Florida, beating Brandon Hicklin (9.92s) and Christian Coleman (9.93s) in the race, having also ran a wind-assisted 9.87 seconds in the preliminary race to finish ahead of Cravont Charleston. Later that month, he was runner-up at the Nike Outdoor Nationals championships 100 metres in 10.11 seconds, 0.01 seconds behind Tate Taylor.

He entered the 100 metres at the senior USA Track and Field Championships held in Eugene, Oregon, in 2025, reaching the semi-finals after finishing second in his heat behind Kenny Bednarek, in 10.10 seconds (+0.6 m/s). After running his semi-final the following day in 10.05 seconds (+0.01), he then finished sixth overall in the final in a personal best time of 9.92 seconds (+1.8). He was selected for the American team for the 2025 World Athletics Championships in Tokyo, Japan, as part of the relay pool.

After running for the University of Georgia in the 2026 outdoor season, Gleaton entered the transfer portal where his goal was to play football and run track and field.
