= 100 metres =

Sprint race

Athletics 100 metres
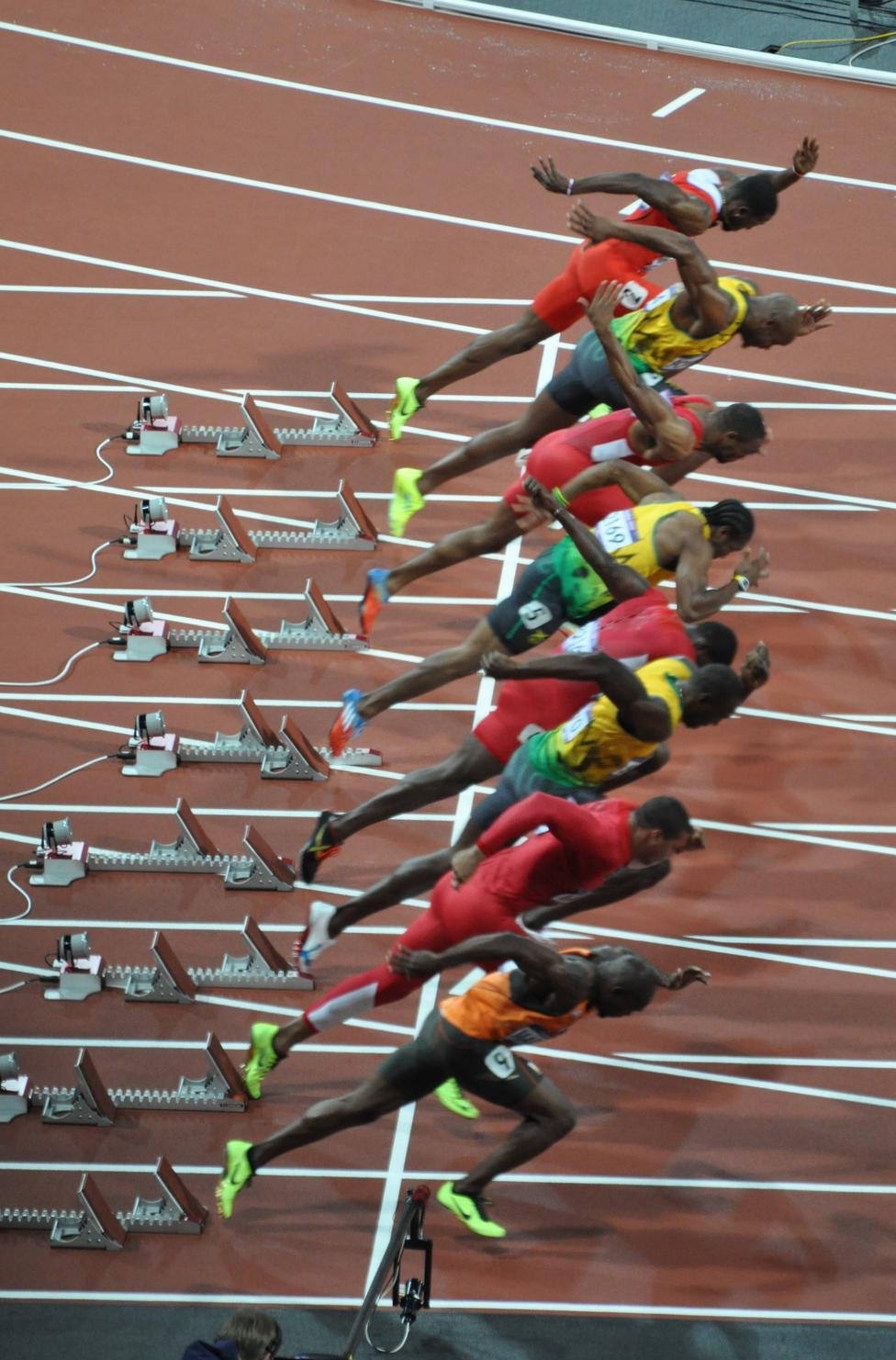
- Start of the men's 100 metres final at the 2012 Olympic Games in London

World records
- Men: Usain Bolt (JAM) 9.58 (2009)
- Women: Florence Griffith Joyner (USA) 10.49 (Note: It is widely believed that the anemometer was faulty for the race in which Florence Griffith Joyner set the official world record for the women's 100 m of 10.49 s. A 1995 report commissioned by the IAAF estimated the true wind speed was between +5.0 m/s and +7.0 m/s, rather than the ±0.0 m/s recorded. If this time, recorded in the quarter-final of the 1988 U.S. Olympic trials, were excluded, the world record would be 10.54 s, recorded by Elaine Thompson-Herah at the Prefontaine Classic meet in Eugene, Oregon on 21 August 2021.) (1988)

Olympic records
- Men: Usain Bolt (JAM) 9.63 (2012)
- Women: Elaine Thompson-Herah (JAM) 10.61 (2021)

World Championship records
- Men: Usain Bolt (JAM) 9.58 (2009)
- Women: Melissa Jefferson-Wooden (USA) 10.61 (2025)

World junior (U20) records
- Men: Letsile Tebogo (BOT) 9.91 (2022)
- Women: Sha'Carri Richardson (USA) 10.75 (2019)

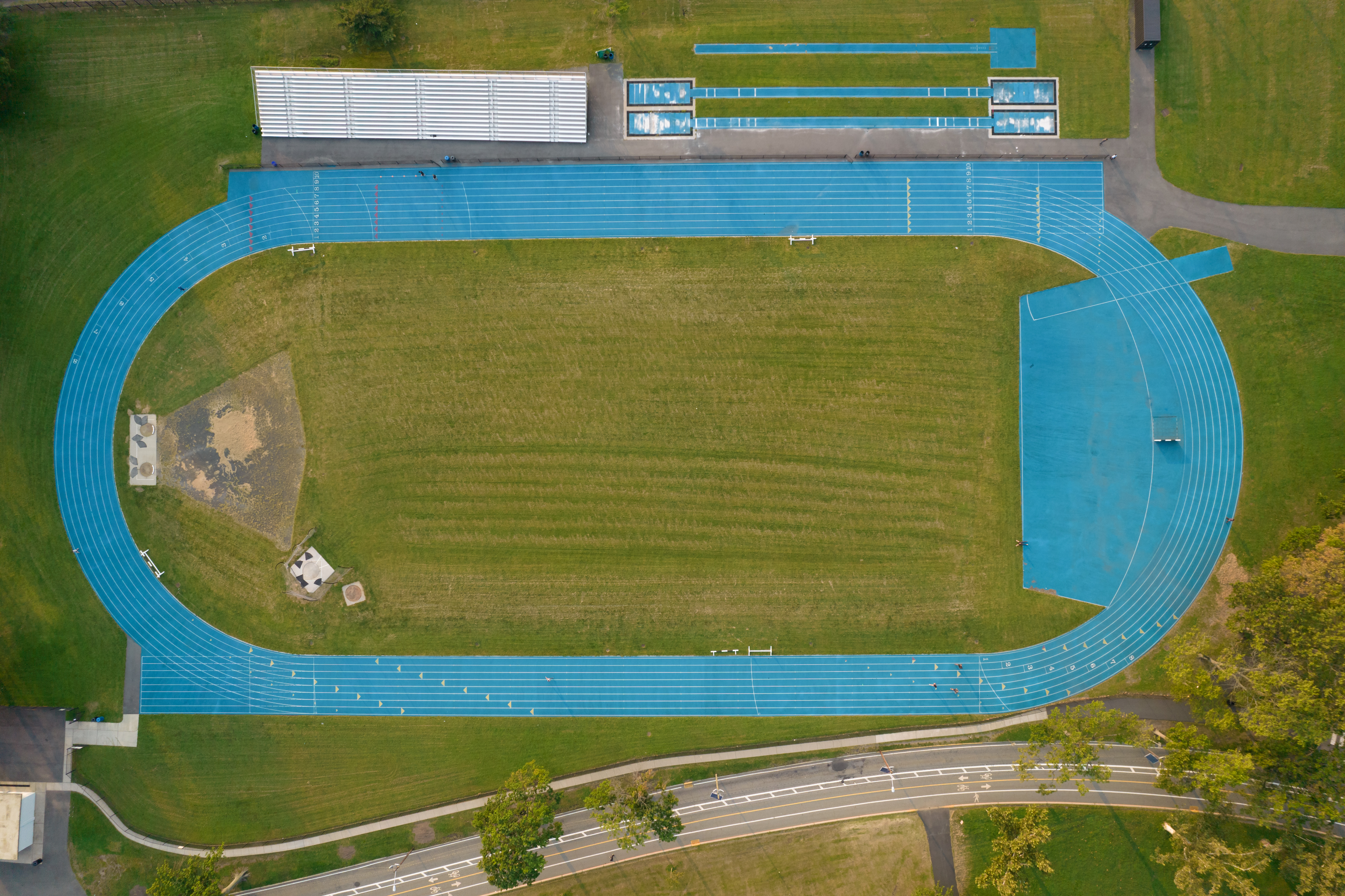
Start (green) and end (red) points of a 100 metre race, marked on a running track

The 100 metres, or 100-meter dash, is a sprint race in track and field competitions. The shortest common outdoor running distance, the 100-metre (109.36 yd) dash is one of the most popular and prestigious events in the sport of athletics. It has been contested at the Summer Olympics since 1896 for men and since 1928 for women. The inaugural World Championships were in 1983.

On an outdoor 400-metre running track, the 100 m is held on the home straight, with the start usually being set on an extension to make it a straight-line race. There are three instructions given to the runners immediately before and at the beginning of the race: "on your marks", "set", and the firing of the starter's pistol. The runners move to the starting blocks when they hear the "on your marks" instruction. The following instruction, to adopt the "set" position, allows them to adopt a more efficient starting posture and isometrically preload their muscles: this will help them to start faster. A race-official then fires the starter's pistol to signal the race beginning and the sprinters stride forwards from the blocks. Sprinters typically reach top speed after somewhere between 50 and 60 m. Their speed then slows towards the finish line.

Women's 100 m Final – 2015 World Championships, won by Jamaican sprinter Shelly-Ann Fraser-Pryce

The 10-second barrier has historically been a barometer of fast men's performances, while the best female sprinters take eleven seconds or less to complete the race. The men's world record is 9.58 seconds, set by Jamaica's Usain Bolt in 2009, while the women's world record is 10.49 seconds, set by American Florence Griffith Joyner in 1988.

The 100 metres is considered one of the blue ribbon events of the Olympics and is among the highest profile competitions at the games. It is the most prestigious 100 metres race at an elite level and is the shortest sprinting competition at the Olympics – a position it has held at every edition except for a brief period between 1900 and 1904, when a men's 60 metres was contested. The unofficial "world's fastest man or woman" title typically goes to the Olympic or world 100 metres champion. The 200 metre time almost always yields a "faster" average speed than a 100-metre race time, since the initial slow speed at the start is spread out over the longer distance. The current men's Olympic champion is Noah Lyles, while the current world champion is Oblique Seville. The current women's Olympic champion is Julien Alfred, and the world champion is Melissa Jefferson-Wooden.

== Race dynamics ==
=== Start ===
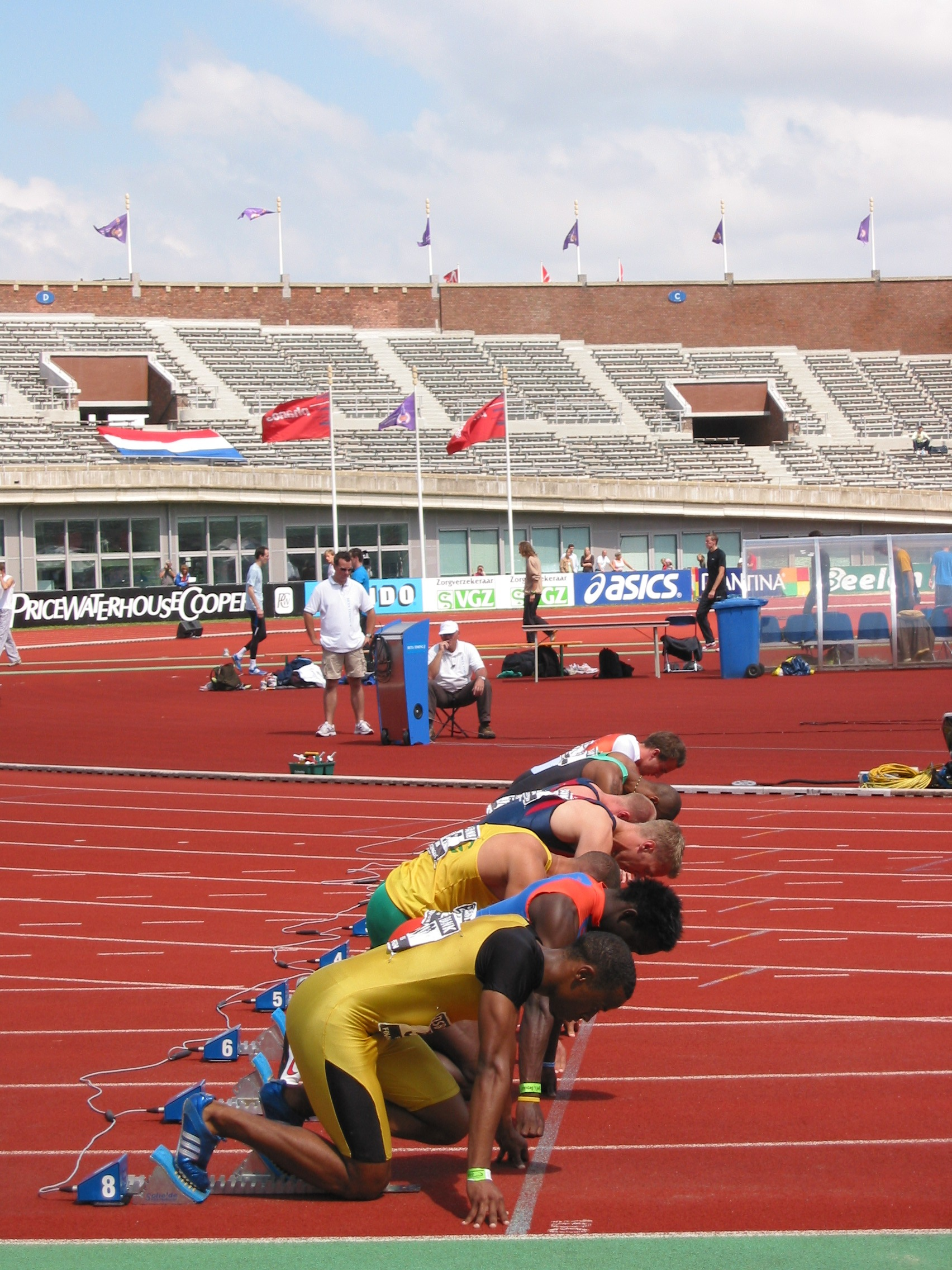
Male sprinters await the starter's instructions

At the start, some athletes play psychological games such as trying to be last to the starting blocks.

At high level meets, the time between the gun and first kick against the starting block is measured electronically, via sensors built in the gun and the blocks. A reaction time less than 0.100 s is considered a false start. This time interval accounts for the sum of the time it takes for the sound of the starter's pistol to reach the runners' ears, and the time they take to react to it.

For many years a sprinter was disqualified if responsible for two false starts individually. However, this rule allowed some major races to be restarted so many times that the sprinters started to lose focus. The next iteration of the rule, introduced in February 2003, meant that one false start was allowed among the field, but anyone responsible for a subsequent false start was disqualified.

This rule led to some sprinters deliberately false-starting to gain a psychological advantage: an individual with a slower reaction time might false-start, forcing the faster starters to wait and be sure of hearing the gun for the subsequent start, thereby losing some of their advantage. To avoid such abuse and to improve spectator enjoyment, the IAAF implemented a further change in the 2010 season – a false starting athlete now receives immediate disqualification. This proposal was met with objections when first raised in 2005, on the grounds that it would not leave any room for innocent mistakes. Justin Gatlin commented, "Just a flinch or a leg cramp could cost you a year's worth of work." The rule had a dramatic impact at the 2011 World Championships, when current world record holder Usain Bolt was disqualified.

=== Mid-race ===
Runners usually reach their top speed just past the halfway point of the race and progressively decelerate to the finish. Maintaining that top speed for as long as possible is a primary focus of training for the 100 m. Pacing and running tactics do not play a significant role in the 100 m, as success in the event depends more on pure athletic qualities and technique.

=== Finish ===
The winner, by IAAF Competition Rules, is determined by the first athlete with their torso (not including limbs, head, or neck) over the nearer edge of the finish line. There is therefore no requirement for the entire body to cross the finish line. When the placing of the athletes is not obvious, a photo finish is used to distinguish which runner was first to cross the line.

=== Climatic conditions ===
Climatic conditions, in particular air resistance, can affect performances in the 100 m. A strong head wind is very detrimental to performance, while a tail wind can improve performances significantly. For this reason, a maximum tail wind of 2.0 metres per second (4.5 mph) is allowed for a 100 m performance to be considered eligible for records, or "wind legal".

Furthermore, sprint athletes perform a better run at high altitudes because of the thinner air, which provides less air resistance. In theory, the thinner air would also make breathing slightly more difficult (due to the partial pressure of oxygen being lower), but this difference is negligible for sprint distances where all the oxygen needed for the short dash is already in the muscles and bloodstream when the race starts. While there are no limitations on altitude, performances made at altitudes greater than 1000 m above sea level are marked with an "A".

== 10-second and 11-second barriers ==
The 10-second mark had been widely considered a barrier for the 100 metres in men's sprinting. The first man to break the 10-second barrier with automatic timing was Jim Hines at the 1968 Summer Olympics. Since then, more than 200 sprinters have run faster than 10 seconds. Similarly, 11 seconds is considered the standard for female athletes. The first woman to go under 11 seconds was Marlies Göhr in 1977.

== Record performances ==
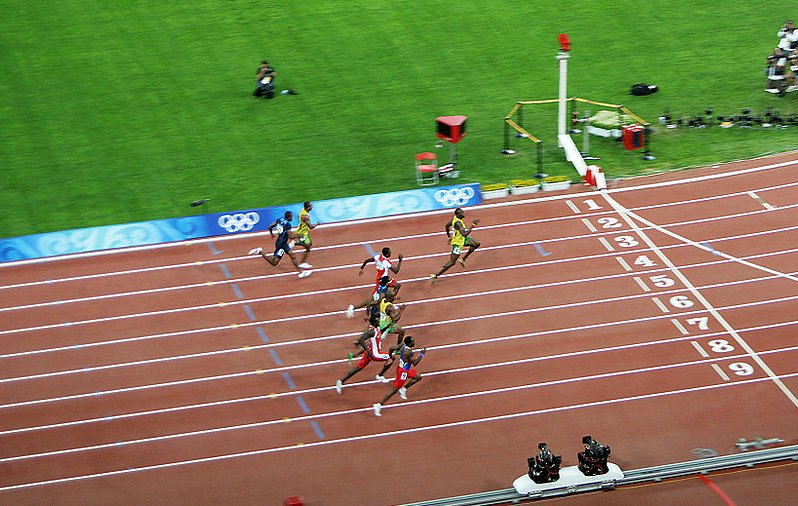
Usain Bolt breaking the world and Olympic records at the 2008 Beijing Olympics

Major 100 m races, such as at the Olympic Games, attract much attention, particularly when the world record is thought to be within reach.

The men's world record has been improved upon twelve times since electronic timing became mandatory in 1977. The current men's world record of 9.58 s is held by Usain Bolt of Jamaica, set at the 2009 World Athletics Championships final in Berlin, Germany on 16 August 2009, breaking his own previous world record by 0.11 s. The current women's world record of 10.49 s was set by Florence Griffith Joyner of the US, at the 1988 United States Olympic Trials in Indianapolis, Indiana, on 16 July 1988 breaking Evelyn Ashford's four-year-old world record by 0.27 seconds. The extraordinary nature of this result and those of several other sprinters in this race raised the possibility of a technical malfunction with the wind gauge which read at ±0.0 m/s – a reading which was at complete odds to the windy conditions on the day with high wind speeds being recorded in all other sprints before and after this race as well as the parallel long jump runway at the time of the Griffith Joyner performance. The next best wind legal performance is Elaine Thompson-Herah's 10.54 second clocking in 2021 at the Prefontaine Classic. Griffith Joyner's next best legal performance of 10.61 from 1988, would have her third on the all-time list behind Thompson-Herah and Shelly-Ann Fraser-Pryce (10.60).

Some records have been marred by prohibited drug use – in particular, the scandal at the 1988 Summer Olympics when the winner, Canadian Ben Johnson, was stripped of his medal and world record.

Jim Hines, Ronnie Ray Smith and Charles Greene were the first to break the 10-second barrier in the 100 m, all on 20 June 1968, the Night of Speed. Hines also recorded the first legal electronically timed sub-10 second 100 m in winning the 100 metres at the 1968 Olympics. Bob Hayes ran a wind-assisted 9.91 seconds at the 1964 Olympics.

=== Area records ===
- Updated 1 August 2026.

Area	Men				Women			
Area	Time (s)	Wind (m/s)	Season	Athlete	Time (s)	Wind (m/s)	Season	Athlete
World	9.58	+0.9	2009	Usain Bolt (JAM)	10.49	±0.0	1988	Florence Griffith Joyner (USA)
Area records
Africa (records)	9.77 A	+1.2	2021	Ferdinand Omanyala (KEN)	10.72	+0.4	2022	Marie Josée Ta Lou (CIV)
Asia (records)	9.83	+0.9	2021	Su Bingtian (CHN)	10.79	±0.0	1997	Li Xuemei (CHN)
Europe (records)	9.80	+0.1	2021	Marcell Jacobs (ITA)	10.73	+2.0	1998	Christine Arron (FRA)
North, Central America and Caribbean (records)	9.58	+0.9	2009	Usain Bolt (JAM)	10.49	±0.0	1988	Florence Griffith Joyner (USA)
Oceania (records)	9.85	+1.3	2026	Lachlan Kennedy (AUS)	10.93	+1.0	2026	Zoe Hobbs (NZL)
South America (records)	9.85 A	+1.5	2026	Ronal Longa (COL)	10.91	−0.2	2017	Rosângela Santos (BRA)

== All-time top 25 men ==
Tables show data for two definitions of "Top 25" - the top 25 100m times and the top 25 athletes:
- denotes top performance for athletes in the top 25 100m times
- denotes lesser performances, still in the top 25 100m times, by repeat athletes
- denotes top performance (only) for other top 25 athletes who fall outside the top 25 100m times

As of July 2026

Ath.#	Perf.#	Time (s)	Wind (m/s)	Reaction (s)	Athlete	Nation	Date	Place	Ref.
1	1	9.58	+0.9	0.146	Usain Bolt	Jamaica	16 August 2009	Berlin	
	2	9.63	+1.5	0.165	Bolt #2		5 August 2012	London	
	3	9.69	±0.0	0.165	Bolt #3		16 August 2008	Beijing	
2	3	9.69	+2.0	0.178	Tyson Gay	United States	20 September 2009	Shanghai	
2	3	9.69	−0.1	0.142	Yohan Blake	Jamaica	23 August 2012	Lausanne	
	6	9.71	+0.9	0.144	Gay #2		16 August 2009	Berlin	
	7	9.72	+1.7	0.157	Bolt #4		31 May 2008	New York City	
4	7	9.72	+0.2		Asafa Powell	Jamaica	2 September 2008	Lausanne	
	9	9.74	+1.7	0.137	Powell #2		9 September 2007	Rieti	
5	9	9.74	+0.9	0.161	Justin Gatlin	United States	15 May 2015	Doha	
	11	9.75	+1.1		Blake #2		29 June 2012	Kingston	
	11	9.75	+1.5	0.179	Blake #3		5 August 2012	London	
	11	9.75	+0.9	0.164	Gatlin #2		4 June 2015	Rome	
	11	9.75	+1.4	0.154	Gatlin #3		9 July 2015	Lausanne	
6	11	9.75	+0.8		Kishane Thompson	Jamaica	27 June 2025	Kingston	
	16	9.76	+1.8		Bolt #5		3 May 2008	Kingston	
	16	9.76	+1.3	0.154	Bolt #6		16 September 2011	Brussels	
	16	9.76	−0.1	0.152	Bolt #7		31 May 2012	Rome	
	16	9.76	+1.4	0.146	Blake #4		30 August 2012	Zurich	
7	16	9.76	+0.6	0.128	Christian Coleman	United States	28 September 2019	Doha	
7	16	9.76 A	+1.2		Trayvon Bromell	United States	18 September 2021	Nairobi	
7	16	9.76	+1.4		Fred Kerley	United States	24 June 2022	Eugene	
	23	9.77	+1.6	0.150	Powell #3		14 June 2005	Athens	
	23	9.77	+1.5	0.145	Powell #4		11 June 2006	Gateshead	
	23	9.77	+1.0	0.148	Powell #5		18 August 2006	Zurich	
	23	9.77	+1.0		Gay #3		28 June 2008	Eugene	
	23	9.77	−1.3		Bolt #8		5 September 2008	Brussels	
	23	9.77	+0.9		Powell #6		7 September 2008	Rieti	
	23	9.77	+0.4		Gay #4		10 July 2009	Rome	
	23	9.77	−0.3	0.163	Bolt #9		11 August 2013	Moscow	
	23	9.77	+0.6	0.178	Gatlin #4		5 September 2014	Brussels	
	23	9.77	+0.9	0.153	Gatlin #5		23 August 2015	Beijing	
	23	9.77	+1.5		Bromell #2		5 June 2021	Miramar	
10	23	9.77 A	+1.2		Ferdinand Omanyala	Kenya	18 September 2021	Nairobi	
	23	9.77	+1.8		Kerley #2		24 June 2022	Eugene	
	23	9.77	+0.9		K. Thompson #2		28 June 2024	Kingston	
10	23	9.77	+0.3	0.157	Oblique Seville	Jamaica	14 September 2025	Tokyo	
12		9.78	+0.9		Nesta Carter	Jamaica	29 August 2010	Rieti	
13		9.79	+0.1		Maurice Greene	United States	16 June 1999	Athens	
13		9.79	+1.0	0.178	Noah Lyles	United States	4 August 2024	Saint-Denis	
13		9.79	+1.8		Kenny Bednarek	United States	1 August 2025	Eugene	
16		9.80	+1.3		Steve Mullings	Jamaica	4 June 2011	Eugene	
16		9.80	+0.1		Marcell Jacobs	Italy	1 August 2021	Tokyo	
18		9.82	+1.7		Richard Thompson	Trinidad and Tobago	21 June 2014	Port of Spain	
18		9.82	+1.0	0.149	Akani Simbine	South Africa	4 August 2024	Saint-Denis	
18		9.82	+1.3		Bryan Levell	Jamaica	23 July 2025	Eisenstadt	
18		9.82	+1.8		Courtney Lindsey	United States	1 August 2025	Eugene	
22		9.83	+0.9		Su Bingtian	China	1 August 2021	Tokyo	
22		9.83	+0.9		Ronnie Baker	United States	1 August 2021	Tokyo	
22		9.83	+1.3	0.150	Zharnel Hughes	Great Britain	24 June 2023	New York City	
22		9.83	+1.8		T'Mars McCallum	United States	1 August 2025	Eugene	
22		9.83	+1.3		Emmanuel Eseme	Cameroon	28 July 2026	Glasgow	

=== Assisted marks ===
Any performance with a following wind of more than 2.0 metres per second is not counted for record purposes. Below is a list of wind-assisted times (equal or superior to 9.80). Only times that are superior to legal bests are shown:

- Marcell Jacobs (ITA) ran 9.67 (+4.1 m/s) in Eisenstadt on 1 July 2026.
- Tyson Gay (USA) ran 9.68 (+4.1 m/s) during the US Olympic Trials in Eugene, Oregon on 29 June 2008.
- Obadele Thompson (BAR) ran 9.69 (+5.0 m/s) A in El Paso, Texas on 13 April 1996.
- Andre De Grasse (CAN) ran 9.69 (+4.8 m/s) during the Diamond League in Stockholm on 18 June 2017, 9.74 (+2.9 m/s) during the Diamond League in Eugene, Oregon on 21 August 2021, and 9.75 (+2.7 m/s) during the NCAA Division I Championships in Eugene, Oregon on 12 June 2015.
- Kanyinsola Ajayi (NGR) ran 9.72 (+2.2 m/s) during the NCAA Division I Championships in Eugene, Oregon on 12 June 2026.
- Kenny Bednarek (USA) ran 9.72 (+2.4 m/s) in Los Angeles, California on 14 June 2026.
- Richard Thompson (TTO) ran 9.74 (+5.0 m/s) in Clermont, Florida on 31 May 2014.
- Eddie Osei-Nketia (AUS) ran 9.74 (+5.6 m/s) in Lincoln, Nebraska on 17 May 2026.
- Darvis Patton (USA) ran 9.75 (+4.3 m/s) in Austin, Texas on 30 March 2013.
- Trayvon Bromell (USA) ran 9.75 (+2.1 m/s) in Jacksonville, Florida on 30 April 2022.
- Jordan Anthony (USA) ran 9.75 (+2.1 m/s) in College Station, Texas on 30 May 2025.
- Jaleel Croal (IVB) ran 9.75 (+6.0 m/s) in Denton, Texas on 16 May 2026.
- Churandy Martina (AHO) ran 9.76 (+6.1 m/s) A in El Paso, Texas on 13 May 2006.
- Romell Glave (GBR) ran 9.76 (+4.1 m/s) in Eisenstadt on 1 July 2026.
- Noah Lyles (USA) ran 9.76 (+2.1 m/s) in New York City, New York on 24 July 2026.
- Carl Lewis (USA) ran 9.78 (+5.2 m/s) during the US Olympic Trials in Indianapolis, Indiana on 16 July 1988 and 9.80 (+4.3 m/s) during the World Championships in Tokyo on 24 August 1991.
- Maurice Greene (USA) ran 9.78 (+3.7 m/s) in Palo Alto, California on 31 May 2004.
- Ronnie Baker (USA) ran 9.78 (+2.4 m/s) during the Diamond League in Eugene, Oregon on 26 May 2018.
- Andre Cason (USA) ran 9.79 (+5.3 m/s) and 9.79 (+4.5 m/s) during the USA Championships in Eugene, Oregon on 16 June 1993.
- Favour Ashe (NGR) ran 9.79 (+3.0 m/s) in Baton Rouge, Louisiana on 30 April 2022.
- Walter Dix (USA) ran 9.80 (+4.1 m/s) during the US Olympic Trials in Eugene, Oregon on 29 June 2008.
- Mike Rodgers (USA) ran 9.80 (+2.7 m/s) during the Diamond League in Eugene, Oregon on 31 May 2014 and 9.80 (+2.4 m/s) in Sacramento, California on 27 June 2014.
- Terrance Laird (USA) ran 9.80 (+3.2 m/s) in College Station, Texas on 15 May 2021.
- Marvin Bracy (USA) ran 9.80 (+2.9 m/s) in Montverde, Florida on 4 June 2022.
- Patrick Ize-Iyamu (USA) ran 9.80 (+5.6 m/s) in Lincoln, Nebraska on 17 May 2026.

=== Annulled marks ===
- Tyson Gay (USA) also ran 9.75 (+1.1 m/s) during the USA Championships in Des Moines, Iowa on 21 June 2013, but he was later disqualified after he failed a drug test and his time was subsequently rescinded.
- Justin Gatlin (USA) also ran 9.77 (+1.7 m/s) in Doha on 12 May 2006, which at the time equalled the world record and was later ratified. However, that same year, Gatlin tested positive for testosterone and the record was subsequently rescinded.
- Tim Montgomery (USA) ran 9.78 (+2.0 m/s) in Paris on 14 September 2002, which was at the time ratified as a world record. However, the record was rescinded in December 2005 following his indictment in the BALCO scandal on drug use and drug trafficking charges. The time had stood as the world record until Asafa Powell first ran 9.77.
- Ben Johnson (CAN) ran 9.79 (+1.1 m/s) during the Olympics in Seoul on 24 September 1988, but he was disqualified after he tested positive for stanozolol after the race. He subsequently admitted to drug use between 1981 and 1988, and also his time of 9.83 (+1.0 m/s) during the World Championships in Rome on 30 August 1987 was rescinded.

== All-time top 25 women ==
Tables show data for two definitions of "Top 25" - the top 25 100m times and the top 25 athletes:
- denotes top performance for athletes in the top 25 100m times
- denotes lesser performances, still in the top 25 100m times, by repeat athletes
- denotes top performance (only) for other top 25 athletes who fall outside the top 25 100m times

As of September 2026

Ath.#	Perf.#	Time (s)	Wind (m/s)	Reaction (s)	Athlete	Nation	Date	Place	Ref.
1	1	10.49	±0.0		Florence Griffith Joyner	United States	16 July 1988	Indianapolis	
2	2	10.54	+0.9	0.150	Elaine Thompson-Herah	Jamaica	21 August 2021	Eugene	
3	3	10.60	+1.7	0.151	Shelly-Ann Fraser-Pryce	Jamaica	26 August 2021	Lausanne	
	4	10.61	+1.2	0.12	Griffith Joyner #2		17 July 1988	Indianapolis	
	4	10.61	−0.6	0.150	Thompson-Herah #2		31 July 2021	Tokyo	
4	4	10.61	+0.3	0.173	Melissa Jefferson-Wooden	United States	14 September 2025	Tokyo	
	7	10.62	+1.0	0.107	Griffith Joyner #3		24 September 1988	Seoul	
	7	10.62	+0.4	0.134	Fraser-Pryce #2		10 August 2022	Monaco	
	7	10.62	−0.2	0.163	Jefferson-Wooden #2		12 September 2026	Budapest	
	10	10.63	+1.3		Fraser-Pryce #3		5 June 2021	Kingston	
5	10	10.63	+1.9		Adaejah Hodge	British Virgin Islands	11 June 2026	Eugene	
6	12	10.64	+1.2	0.150	Carmelita Jeter	United States	20 September 2009	Shanghai	
	12	10.64	+1.7	0.154	Thompson-Herah #3		26 August 2021	Lausanne	
7	14	10.65 A	+1.1	0.183	Marion Jones	United States	12 September 1998	Johannesburg	
	14	10.65	+0.6	0.139	Thompson-Herah #4		9 September 2021	Zurich	
	14	10.65	−0.8	0.159	Fraser-Pryce #4		8 September 2022	Zurich	
7	14	10.65	+1.0		Shericka Jackson	Jamaica	7 July 2023	Kingston	
7	14	10.65	−0.2	0.156	Sha'Carri Richardson	United States	21 August 2023	Budapest	
	14	10.65	+0.4		Jefferson-Wooden #3		1 August 2025	Eugene	
	20	10.66	+0.5	0.152	Fraser-Pryce #5		6 August 2022	Chorzów	
	20	10.66	+0.1	0.155	Jefferson-Wooden #4		16 August 2025	Chorzów	
	22	10.67	−0.1	0.145	Jeter #2		13 September 2009	Thessaloniki	
	22	10.67 A	−0.4		Fraser-Pryce #6		7 May 2022	Nairobi	
	22	10.67	+0.5	0.137	Fraser-Pryce #7		18 June 2022	Paris	
	22	10.67	+0.8	0.137	Fraser-Pryce #8		17 July 2022	Eugene	
	22	10.67	+1.3	0.139	Fraser-Pryce #9		8 August 2022	Székesfehérvár	
10		10.70	−0.7	0.139	Julien Alfred	Saint Lucia	27 August 2026	Zurich	
11		10.72	+0.4	0.176	Marie Josée Ta Lou	Ivory Coast	10 August 2022	Monaco	
12		10.73	+2.0		Christine Arron	France	19 August 1998	Budapest	
13		10.74	+1.3		Merlene Ottey	Jamaica	7 September 1996	Milan	
13		10.74	+1.0		English Gardner	United States	3 July 2016	Eugene	
15		10.75	+0.4	0.178	Kerron Stewart	Jamaica	10 July 2009	Rome	
16		10.76	+1.7		Evelyn Ashford	United States	22 August 1984	Zurich	
16		10.76	+1.1		Veronica Campbell-Brown	Jamaica	31 May 2011	Ostrava	
16		10.76	+0.3	0.203	Tina Clayton	Jamaica	14 September 2025	Tokyo	
19		10.77	+0.9		Irina Privalova	Russia	6 July 1994	Lausanne	
19		10.77	+0.7		Ivet Lalova	Bulgaria	19 June 2004	Plovdiv	
19		10.77	+1.6		Jacious Sears	United States	13 April 2024	Gainesville	
22		10.78 A	+1.0		Dawn Sowell	United States	3 June 1989	Provo	
22		10.78	+1.8		Torri Edwards	United States	28 June 2008	Eugene	
22		10.78	+1.6		Murielle Ahouré	Ivory Coast	11 June 2016	Montverde	
22		10.78	+1.0		Tianna Bartoletta	United States	3 July 2016	Eugene	
22		10.78	+1.0		Tori Bowie	United States	3 July 2016	Eugene	

=== Assisted marks ===
Any performance with a following wind of more than 2.0 metres per second is not counted for record purposes. Below is a list of wind-assisted times (equal or superior to 10.75). Only times that are superior to legal bests are shown:

- Sha'Carri Richardson (USA) ran 10.57 (+4.1 m/s) in Miramar, Florida on 8 April 2023.
- Brittany Brown (USA) ran 10.66 (+3.2 m/s) in Waco, Texas on 23 April 2022.
- Tori Bowie (USA) ran 10.72 (+3.2 m/s) during the USA Championships in Eugene, Oregon on 26 June 2015 and 10.74 (+3.1 m/s) during the US Olympic Trials in Eugene, Oregon on 3 July 2016.
- Tawanna Meadows (USA) ran 10.72 (+4.5 m/s) in Lubbock, Texas on 6 May 2017.
- Blessing Okagbare (NGR) ran 10.72 (+2.7 m/s) in Austin, Texas on 31 March 2018 and 10.75 (+2.2 m/s) during the Diamond League in Eugene, Oregon on 1 June 2013.
- Aleia Hobbs (USA) ran 10.72 (+2.9 m/s) during the USA Championships in Eugene, Oregon on 24 June 2022.
- Cambrea Sturgis (USA) ran 10.74 (+2.2 m/s) during the NCAA Division I Championships in Eugene, Oregon on 12 June 2021.
- Twanisha Terry (USA) ran 10.74 (+2.9 m/s) during the USA Championships in Eugene, Oregon on 24 June 2022.
- Brianna Selby (USA) ran 10.74 (+3.8 m/s) in Lincoln, Nebraska on 17 May 2026.
- Jenna Prandini (USA) ran 10.75 (+4.3 m/s) in Montverde, Florida on 4 June 2022.

=== Annulled assisted marks ===
- Blessing Okagbare (NGR) ran 10.63 (+2.7 m/s) in Lagos on 17 June 2021. Following the heats during the Olympics in Tokyo, she was suspended on 31 July 2021 after failing a drug test taken on 19 July 2021, which tested positive for human growth hormone. Her time was subsequently rescinded.
- Sha'Carri Richardson (USA) ran 10.64 (+2.6 m/s) during the US Olympic trials in Eugene, Oregon on 19 June 2021, but her result was later nullified due to a positive test for cannabis.

== World leading times ==
=== Men ===
Year	Time	Athlete	Place
1972	10.07	Valeriy Borzov (URS)	Munich
1973	10.15	Steve Williams (USA)	Dakar
1974	9.9 h	Steve Williams (USA)	Los Angeles
1975	10.05	Steve Riddick (USA)	Zurich
1976	10.06	Hasely Crawford (TRI)	Montreal
1977	9.98 A	Silvio Leonard (CUB)	Guadalajara
1978	10.07	Clancy Edwards (USA)	Eugene
1978	10.07 A	Eddie Hart (USA)	Colorado Springs
1978	10.07	Steve Williams (USA)	Zurich
1979	10.01 A	Pietro Mennea (ITA)	Mexico City
1980	10.02	James Sanford (USA)	Westwood
1981	10.00	Carl Lewis (USA)	Dallas
1982	10.00	Carl Lewis (USA)	Modesto
1983	9.93 A	Calvin Smith (USA)	Colorado Springs
1984	9.96	Mel Lattany (USA)	Athens
1985	9.98	Carl Lewis (USA)	Modesto
1986	10.00	Chidi Imoh (NGR)	Berlin
1987	9.93	Carl Lewis (USA)	Rome
1988	9.92	Carl Lewis (USA)	Seoul
1989	9.94	Leroy Burrell (USA)	Houston
1990	9.96	Leroy Burrell (USA)	Villeneuve d'Ascq
1990	9.96 A	Leroy Burrell (USA)	Sestriere
1991	9.86	Carl Lewis (USA)	Tokyo
1992	9.93	Michael Marsh (USA)	Walnut
1993	9.87	Linford Christie (GBR)	Stuttgart
1994	9.85	Leroy Burrell (USA)	Lausanne
1995	9.91	Donovan Bailey (CAN)	Montreal
1996	9.84	Donovan Bailey (CAN)	Atlanta
1997	9.86	Maurice Greene (USA)	Athens
1998	9.86	Ato Boldon (TRI)	Walnut
1998	9.86	Ato Boldon (TRI)	Athens
1999	9.79	Maurice Greene (USA)	Athens
2000	9.86	Maurice Greene (USA)	Berlin
2001	9.82	Maurice Greene (USA)	Edmonton
2002	9.89	Maurice Greene (USA)	Rome
2003	9.93	Patrick Johnson (AUS)	Mito
2004	9.85	Justin Gatlin (USA)	Athens
2005	9.77	Asafa Powell (JAM)	Athens
2006	9.77	Asafa Powell (JAM)	Gateshead
2006	9.77	Asafa Powell (JAM)	Zurich
2007	9.74	Asafa Powell (JAM)	Rieti
2008	9.69	Usain Bolt (JAM)	Beijing
2009	9.58	Usain Bolt (JAM)	Berlin
2010	9.78	Tyson Gay (USA)	London
2010	9.78	Nesta Carter (JAM)	Rieti
2011	9.76	Usain Bolt (JAM)	Brussels
2012	9.63	Usain Bolt (JAM)	London
2013	9.77	Usain Bolt (JAM)	Moscow
2014	9.77	Justin Gatlin (USA)	Brussels
2015	9.74	Justin Gatlin (USA)	Doha
2016	9.80	Justin Gatlin (USA)	Eugene
2017	9.82	Christian Coleman (USA)	Eugene
2018	9.79	Christian Coleman (USA)	Brussels
2019	9.76	Christian Coleman (USA)	Doha
2020	9.86	Michael Norman (USA)	Fort Worth
2021	9.76 A	Trayvon Bromell (USA)	Nairobi
2022	9.76	Fred Kerley (USA)	Eugene
2023	9.83	Zharnel Hughes (GBR)	New York City
2023	9.83	Noah Lyles (USA)	Budapest
2023	9.83	Christian Coleman (USA)	Xiamen
2023	9.83	Christian Coleman (USA)	Eugene
2024	9.77	Kishane Thompson (JAM)	Kingston
2025	9.75	Kishane Thompson (JAM)	Kingston
2026	9.79	Noah Lyles (USA)	New York City

=== Women ===
Year	Time	Athlete	Place
1972	11.07	Renate Stecher (GDR)	Munich
1973	11.07	Renate Stecher (GDR)	Dresden
1974	11.13	Irena Szewinska (POL)	Rome
1975	11.13	Renate Stecher (GDR)	Dresden
1976	11.01	Annegret Richter (FRG)	Montreal
1977	10.88	Marlies Göhr (GDR)	Dresden
1978	10.94	Marlies Göhr (GDR)	Dresden
1979	10.97	Marlies Göhr (GDR)	Dresden
1979	10.97	Evelyn Ashford (USA)	Walnut
1980	10.93	Marlies Göhr (GDR)	Dresden
1981	10.90 A	Evelyn Ashford (USA)	Colorado Springs
1982	10.88	Marlies Göhr (GDR)	Karl-Marx-Stadt
1983	10.79 A	Evelyn Ashford (USA)	Colorado Springs
1984	10.76	Evelyn Ashford (USA)	Zurich
1985	10.86	Marlies Göhr (GDR)	Berlin
1986	10.88	Evelyn Ashford (USA)	Rieti
1987	10.86	Anelia Nuneva (BUL)	Belgrade
1987	10.86	Silke Möller (GDR)	Potsdam
1988	10.49	Florence Griffith Joyner (USA)	Indianapolis
1989	10.78 A	Dawn Sowell (USA)	Provo
1990	10.78	Merlene Ottey (JAM)	Seville
1991	10.79	Merlene Ottey (JAM)	Vigo
1992	10.80	Merlene Ottey (JAM)	Salamanca
1993	10.82	Gail Devers (USA)	Lausanne
1993	10.82	Gail Devers (USA)	Stuttgart
1993	10.82	Merlene Ottey (JAM)	Stuttgart
1994	10.77	Irina Privalova (RUS)	Lausanne
1995	10.84	Gwen Torrence (USA)	Gothenburg
1996	10.74	Merlene Ottey (JAM)	Milan
1997	10.76	Marion Jones (USA)	Brussels
1998	10.65 A	Marion Jones (USA)	Johannesburg
1999	10.70	Marion Jones (USA)	Seville
2000	10.78	Marion Jones (USA)	London
2001	10.82	Zhanna Block (UKR)	Edmonton
2002	10.91	Debbie Ferguson-McKenzie (BAH)	Manchester
2003	10.86	Chryste Gaines (USA)	Monaco
2004	10.77	Ivet Lalova (BUL)	Plovdiv
2005	10.84	Chandra Sturrup (BAH)	Lausanne
2006	10.82	Sherone Simpson (JAM)	Kingston
2007	10.89	Veronica Campbell-Brown (JAM)	Kingston
2008	10.78	Torri Edwards (USA)	Eugene
2008	10.78	Shelly-Ann Fraser (JAM)	Beijing
2009	10.64	Carmelita Jeter (USA)	Shanghai
2010	10.78	Veronica Campbell-Brown (JAM)	Eugene
2011	10.70	Carmelita Jeter (USA)	Eugene
2012	10.70	Shelly-Ann Fraser-Pryce (JAM)	Kingston
2013	10.71	Shelly-Ann Fraser-Pryce (JAM)	Moscow
2014	10.80	Tori Bowie (USA)	Monaco
2015	10.74	Shelly-Ann Fraser-Pryce (JAM)	Saint-Denis
2016	10.70	Elaine Thompson (JAM)	Kingston
2017	10.71	Elaine Thompson (JAM)	Kingston
2018	10.85	Marie Josée Ta Lou (CIV)	Doha
2018	10.85	Dina Asher-Smith (GBR)	Berlin
2019	10.71	Shelly-Ann Fraser-Pryce (JAM)	Doha
2020	10.85	Elaine Thompson-Herah (JAM)	Rome
2021	10.54	Elaine Thompson-Herah (JAM)	Eugene
2022	10.62	Shelly-Ann Fraser-Pryce (JAM)	Monaco
2023	10.65	Shericka Jackson (JAM)	Kingston
2023	10.65	Sha'Carri Richardson (USA)	Budapest
2024	10.71	Sha'Carri Richardson (USA)	Eugene
2025	10.61	Melissa Jefferson-Wooden (USA)	Tokyo
2026	10.62	Melissa Jefferson-Wooden (USA)	Budapest

== Top 25 junior (under-20) men ==
Updated June 2026

Rank	Time	Wind (m/s)	Athlete	Nation	Date	Place	Age	Ref.
1	9.91 A	+0.8	Letsile Tebogo	Botswana	2 August 2022	Cali	19 years, 60 days	
2	9.92	+1.8	Maurice Gleaton	United States	1 August 2025	Eugene	18 years, 248 days	
2	9.92	+1.1	Tate Taylor	United States	3 May 2025	Austin	17 years, 219 days	
4	9.93	+1.6	Christian Miller	United States	20 April 2024	Clermont	17 years, 340 days	
4	9.93	+0.6	Gary Card	Jamaica	19 June 2026	Kingston	19 years, 16 days	
6	9.94	+0.7	Puripol Boonson	Thailand	10 December 2025	Bangkok	19 years, 336 days	
7	9.97	+1.8	Trayvon Bromell	United States	13 June 2014	Eugene	18 years, 338 days	
8	9.99	+0.3	Bouwahjgie Nkrumie	Jamaica	29 March 2023	Kingston	19 years, 41 days	
8	9.99 A	+0.7	Bayanda Walaza	South Africa	15 March 2025	Pretoria	19 years, 34 days	
10	10.00	+1.6	Trentavis Friday	United States	5 July 2014	Eugene	19 years, 30 days	
10	10.00	+1.7	Sorato Shimizu	Japan	26 July 2025	Hiroshima	16 years, 168 days	
10	10.00	+0.9	Gout Gout	Australia	21 February 2026	Brisbane	18 years, 54 days	
13	10.01	±0.0	Darrel Brown	Trinidad and Tobago	24 August 2003	Saint-Denis	18 years, 317 days	
13	10.01	+1.6	Jeff Demps	United States	28 June 2008	Eugene	18 years, 172 days	
13	10.01	+0.9	Yoshihide Kiryū	Japan	28 April 2013	Hiroshima	17 years, 134 days	
13	10.01	+1.1	Brayden Williams	United States	3 May 2025	Austin	18 years, 31 days	
13	10.01 A	+1.9	Renan Gallina	Brazil	19 May 2023	Bogotá	19 years, 65 days	
18	10.03	+0.7	Marcus Rowland	United States	31 July 2009	Port of Spain	19 years, 142 days	
18	10.03	+1.7	Lalu Muhammad Zohri	Indonesia	19 May 2019	Osaka	18 years, 322 days	
18	10.03	+0.6	Udodi Chudi Onwuzurike	Nigeria	27 May 2022	Fayetteville	19 years, 124 days	
18	10.03	+1.9	Bradley Nkoana	South Africa	14 July 2024	La Chaux-de-Fonds	19 years, 169 days	
18	10.03	+1.2	Israel Okon	Nigeria	31 July 2025	Abeokuta	18 years, 262 days	
23	10.04	+1.7	D'Angelo Cherry	United States	10 June 2009	Fayetteville	18 years, 313 days	
23	10.04	+0.2	Christophe Lemaitre	France	24 July 2009	Novi Sad	19 years, 43 days	
23	10.04	+1.9	Abdullah Abkar Mohammed	Saudi Arabia	15 April 2016	Norwalk	18 years, 319 days	
23	10.04	−0.1	Erriyon Knighton	United States	16 April 2022	Gainesville	18 years, 77 days	
23	10.04	+1.8	Marko Ferreira	South Africa	19 June 2026	Montgeron	19 years, 159 days	

=== Notes ===
- Issam Asinga's junior world record of 9.89 seconds and all of his results since 18 July 2023 were rescinded after testing positive for the banned substance GW1516. On 27 May 2024, he was officially banned for four years backdated to August 2023.
- Trayvon Bromell recorded the fastest wind-assisted (+4.2 m/s) time for a junior or age-18 athlete of 9.77 seconds on 18 May 2014 (age 18 years, 312 days).
- Yoshihide Kiryū's time of 10.01 seconds matched the junior world record set by Darrel Brown and Jeff Demps, but was not ratified because of the type of wind gauge used.
- Mark Lewis-Francis recorded a time of 9.97 seconds on 4 August 2001 (age 18 years, 334 days), but the wind gauge malfunctioned.

Below is a list of all other legal times equal or superior to 10.04:

- Letsile Tebogo also ran 9.94 (2022) and 9.96 (2022).
- Trayvon Bromell also ran 10.01 (2014) and 10.02 (2014).
- Bouwahjgie Nkrumie also ran 10.02 A (2022).
- Gary Card also ran 10.03 (2026).
- Tate Taylor also ran 10.04 (2026).

== Top 25 junior (under-20) women ==
Updated October 2026

Rank	Time	Wind (m/s)	Athlete	Nation	Date	Place	Age	Ref.
1	10.75	+1.6	Sha'Carri Richardson	United States	8 June 2019	Austin	19 years, 75 days	
2	10.83	+0.6	Tamari Davis	United States	30 July 2022	Memphis	19 years, 175 days	
3	10.88	+2.0	Marlies Göhr	East Germany	1 July 1977	Dresden	19 years, 102 days	
4	10.89	+1.8	Katrin Krabbe	East Germany	20 July 1988	Berlin	18 years, 241 days	
4	10.89	+0.9	Shawnti Jackson	United States	3 June 2023	Nashville	18 years, 32 days	
6	10.92	+1.0	Alana Reid	Jamaica	29 March 2023	Kingston	18 years, 68 days	
7	10.95 A	−0.1	Tina Clayton	Jamaica	3 August 2022	Cali	17 years, 351 days	
8	10.97	+1.2	Briana Williams	Jamaica	5 June 2021	Miramar	19 years, 76 days	
8	10.97 A	+1.6	Christine Mboma	Namibia	30 April 2022	Gaborone	18 years, 343 days	
10	10.98	+2.0	Candace Hill	United States	20 June 2015	Shoreline	16 years, 129 days	
11	10.99	+0.9	Ángela Tenorio	Ecuador	22 July 2015	Toronto	19 years, 176 days	
11	10.99	+1.7	Twanisha Terry	United States	21 April 2018	Torrance	19 years, 148 days	
13	11.00	+1.5	Mia Brahe-Pedersen	United States	27 May 2023	Eugene	17 years, 180 days	
14	11.01	+1.6	Brianna Selby	United States	12 June 2025	Eugene	19 years, 227 days	
15	11.02	+1.8	Tamara Clark	United States	12 May 2018	Knoxville	19 years, 123 days	
15	11.02	+1.2	Dana Wilson	United States	3 May 2025	Greensboro	18 years, 223 days	
17	11.03	+1.7	Silke Gladisch-Möller	East Germany	8 June 1983	Berlin	18 years, 353 days	
17	11.03	+0.6	English Gardner	United States	14 May 2011	Tucson	19 years, 22 days	
19	11.04	+1.4	Angela Williams	United States	5 June 1999	Boise	19 years, 126 days	
19	11.04	+1.6	Kiara Grant	Jamaica	8 June 2019	Austin	18 years, 243 days	
19	11.04	+0.9	Kaila Jackson	United States	13 May 2023	Baton Rouge	18 years, 317 days	
19	11.04	+1.2	Mia Maxwell	United States	8 June 2025	Renton	17 years, 260 days	
23	11.06	+0.9	Khalifa St. Fort	Trinidad and Tobago	24 June 2017	Port of Spain	19 years, 131 days	
23	11.06	−0.4	Chen Yujie	China	25 September 2026	Nagoya	17 years, 270 days	
25	11.07	+0.7	Bianca Knight	United States	27 June 2008	Eugene	19 years, 177 days	

=== Notes ===
- Briana Williams ran 10.94 seconds at the Jamaican Championships on 21 June 2019, which would have made her the fourth fastest junior female of all time. However, she tested positive for the banned diuretic hydrochlorothiazide during the competition. She was determined to be not at fault and received no period of ineligibility to compete, but her results from the Jamaican Championships were nullified.

Below is a list of all other legal times equal or superior to 11.07:

- Tamari Davis also ran 10.91 (2022).
- Tina Clayton also ran 10.96 (2022).
- Briana Williams also ran 10.98 (2021), 11.00 (2021), 11.01 (2021) and 11.02 (2019, 2021).
- Sha'Carri Richardson also ran 10.99 (2019 × 2).
- Twanisha Terry also ran 11.03 (2018).
- Mia Brahe-Pedersen also ran 11.05 (2023).
- Marlies Gohr also ran 11.07 (1977).
- Candace Hill also ran 11.07 (2016).

== Top 25 youth (under-18) boys ==
Updated August 2025

Rank	Time	Wind (m/s)	Athlete	Nation	Date	Place	Age	Ref.
1	10.00	+1.7	Sorato Shimizu	Japan	26 July 2025	Hiroshima	16 years, 168 days	
2	10.06	+2.0	Christian Miller	United States	8 July 2023	Eugene	17 years, 53 days	
2	10.06	+1.4	Puripol Boonson	Thailand	30 September 2023	Hangzhou	17 years, 260 days	
4	10.15	+2.0	Anthony Schwartz	United States	31 March 2017	Gainesville	16 years, 207 days	
5	10.16	−0.3	Erriyon Knighton	United States	23 May 2021	Boston	17 years, 114 days	
6	10.17	+0.9	Gout Gout	Australia	7 December 2024	Brisbane	16 years, 344 days	
7	10.19	+0.5	Yoshihide Kiryū	Japan	3 November 2012	Fukuroi	16 years, 324 days	
8	10.20	+1.4	Darryl Haraway	United States	15 June 2014	Greensboro	17 years, 87 days	
8	10.20	+1.5	Tlotliso Leotlela	South Africa	7 September 2015	Apia	17 years, 118 days	
8	10.20	+2.0	Sachin Dennis	Jamaica	23 March 2018	Kingston	15 years, 233 days	
11	10.22	+1.0	Abdul Hakim Sani Brown	Japan	14 May 2016	Shanghai	17 years, 69 days	
12	10.23	+0.8	Tamunosiki Atorudibo	Nigeria	23 March 2002	Enugu	17 years, 2 days	
12	10.23	+1.2	Rynell Parson	United States	21 June 2007	Indianapolis	16 years, 345 days	
14	10.24	±0.0	Darrel Brown	Trinidad and Tobago	14 April 2001	Bridgetown	16 years, 185 days	
15	10.25	+1.5	J-Mee Samuels	United States	11 July 2004	Knoxville	17 years, 52 days	
15	10.25	+1.6	Jeff Demps	United States	1 August 2007	Knoxville	17 years, 205 days	
15	10.25	+0.9	Jhevaughn Matherson	Jamaica	5 March 2016	Kingston	17 years, 7 days	
18	10.26	+1.2	Deworski Odom	United States	21 July 1994	Lisbon	17 years, 101 days	
18	10.26	−0.1	Sunday Emmanuel	Nigeria	18 March 1995	Bauchi	16 years, 161 days	
18	10.26	+0.6	Teddy Wilson	Great Britain	24 June 2023	Mannheim	16 years, 207 days	
21	10.27	+0.2	Henry Thomas	United States	19 May 1984	Norwalk	16 years, 314 days	
21	10.27	+1.6	Curtis Johnson	United States	30 June 1990	Fresno	16 years, 188 days	
21	10.27	+1.0	Ivory Williams	United States	8 June 2002	Sacramento	17 years, 37 days	
21	10.27	−0.2	Jazeel Murphy	Jamaica	23 April 2011	Montego Bay	17 years, 55 days	
21	10.27	+1.9	Raheem Chambers	Jamaica	20 April 2014	Fort-de-France	16 years, 196 days	
21	10.27	+1.3	Jeff Erius	France	16 July 2021	Tallinn	17 years, 130 days	
21	10.27	+0.8	Sebastian Sultana	Australia	29 October 2022 (Note: by World Athletics source; 30 October 2022 by OAA source)	Sydney	17 years, 47 days	

=== Notes ===
Below is a list of all other legal times equal or superior to 10.20:

- Puripol Boonson also ran 10.09 (2022), 10.12 (2022), 10.13 (2023), 10.19 (2022) and 10.20 (2022).
- Sorato Shimizu also ran 10.14 (2025) and 10.19 (2025 × 2).

== Top 25 youth (under-18) girls ==
Updated August 2025

Rank	Time	Wind (m/s)	Athlete	Nation	Date	Place	Age	Ref.
1	10.98	+2.0	Candace Hill	United States	20 June 2015	Shoreline	16 years, 129 days	
2	11.02	+0.8	Briana Williams	Jamaica	8 June 2019	Albuquerque	17 years, 79 days	
3	11.09	−0.6	Tina Clayton	Jamaica	19 August 2021	Nairobi	17 years, 2 days	
4	11.10	+0.9	Kaylin Whitney	United States	5 July 2014	Eugene	16 years, 118 days	
4	11.10	+0.7	Chen Yujie	China	17 November 2025	Guangzhou	16 years, 323 days	
6	11.11	+1.7	Adaejah Hodge	British Virgin Islands	29 April 2023	Lubbock	17 years, 47 days	
7	11.13	+2.0	Chandra Cheeseborough	United States	21 June 1976	Eugene	17 years, 163 days	
7	11.13	+1.6	Tamari Davis	United States	9 June 2018	Montverde	15 years, 159 days	
7	11.13	+1.2	Theianna-Lee Terrelonge	Jamaica	28 June 2024	Kingston	16 years, 255 days	
10	11.14	+1.7	Marion Jones	United States	6 June 1992	Norwalk	16 years, 238 days	
10	11.14	−0.5	Angela Williams	United States	21 June 1997	Edwardsville	17 years, 142 days	
10	11.14	+1.7	Leah O'Brian	Australia	8 April 2025	Perth	17 years, 69 days	
13	11.15 A	−0.1	Shawnti Jackson	United States	3 August 2022	Cali	17 years, 93 days	
14	11.16	+1.2	Gabrielle Mayo	United States	22 June 2006	Indianapolis	17 years, 147 days	
14	11.16	+0.9	Kevona Davis	Jamaica	23 March 2018	Kingston	16 years, 93 days	
14	11.16	+1.2	Kerrica Hill	Jamaica	6 April 2022	Kingston	17 years, 31 days	
17	11.17 A	+0.6	Wendy Vereen	United States	3 July 1983	Colorado Springs	17 years, 70 days	
18	11.19	±0.0	Khalifa St. Fort	Trinidad and Tobago	16 July 2015	Cali	17 years, 153 days	
19	11.20 A	+1.2	Raelene Boyle	Australia	15 October 1968	Mexico City	17 years, 144 days	
20	11.21	±0.0	Kelly Doualla	Italy	21 July 2025	Skopje	15 years, 243 days	
21	11.22	+1.2	Alana Reid	Jamaica	6 April 2022	Kingston	17 years, 76 days	
21	11.22 A	+0.2	Viwe Jingqi	South Africa	31 March 2022	Potchefstroom	17 years, 42 days	
23	11.24	+1.2	Jeneba Tarmoh	United States	22 June 2006	Indianapolis	16 years, 268 days	
23	11.24	+0.8	Jodie Williams	Great Britain	31 May 2010	Bedford	16 years, 245 days	

=== Notes ===
- Briana Williams ran 10.94 seconds at the Jamaican Championships on 21 June 2019, which would have been a world under-18 best time. However, she tested positive for the banned diuretic hydrochlorothiazide during the competition. She was determined to be not at fault and received no period of ineligibility to compete, but her results from the Jamaican Championships were nullified.

Below is a list of all other legal times equal or superior to 11.24:

- Briana Williams also ran 11.10 (2019), 11.11 (2019), 11.13 (2018) and 11.21 (2018).
- Adaejah Hodge also ran 11.12 (2023).
- Tamari Davis also ran 11.15 (2020).
- Tina Clayton also ran 11.17 (2021).
- Kevona Davis also ran 11.24 (2017).

== 100 metres per age category ==
The best performances by 5- to 19-year-old athletes are also recorded by Dominique Eisold, exclusively considering performances from 60 countries.

=== Boys ===
Age	Time	Wind (m/s)	Athlete	Date	Place	Age
5	15.93	−2.1	(United States) Kai Sapp	8 June 2019	Henderson, United States	5 years, 355 days
6	14.30	+1.7	(United States) Willie Washington	24 July 2010	Durham, United States	6 years, 350 days
7	13.46	−1.7	(United States) Willie Washington	6 August 2011	New Orleans, United States	7 years, 363 days
8	12.80	+0.5	(United States) Willie Washington	29 July 2012	Baltimore, United States	8 years, 356 days
9	12.45	+1.1	(United States) Willie Washington	3 August 2013	Ypsilanti, United States	9 years, 360 days
10	12.06	−0.4	(United States) Nyckoles Harbor	8 June 2016	Landover, United States	10 years, 339 days
11	11.86	+0.1	(United States) Nyckoles Harbor	25 June 2017	Baltimore, United States	11 years, 355 days
12	11.16	+2.0	(Japan) Shingo Yamamoto	4 October 1998		12 years, 280 days
13	10.82	+1.2	(Trinidad and Tobago) Darrel Brown	10 July 1998	Georgetown, Guyana	13 years, 272 days
14	10.51	−0.7	(Jamaica) Sachin Dennis	31 March 2017	Kingston, Jamaica	14 years, 241 days
15	10.20	+2.0	(Jamaica) Sachin Dennis	23 March 2018	Kingston, Jamaica	15 years, 233 days
16	10.00	+1.7	(Japan) Sorato Shimizu	26 July 2025	Hiroshima, Japan	16 years, 168 days
17	9.92	+1.1	(United States) Tate Taylor	3 May 2025	Austin, United States	17 years, 219 days
18	9.92	+1.1	(United States) Tate Taylor	3 May 2025	Austin, United States	17 years, 219 days
18	9.92	+1.8	(United States) Maurice Gleaton	1 August 2025	Eugene, United States	18 years, 248 days
19	9.84	+1.3	(United States) Trayvon Bromell	25 June 2015	Eugene, United States	19 years, 350 days

=== Girls ===
Age	Time	Wind (m/s)	Athlete	Date	Place	Age
5	16.12	+1.6	(United States) Micahlena Cotton	9 July 2016	Orlando, United States	5 years, 362 days
6	14.89	±0.0	(United States) Stacey Onyepunuka	6 July 2013	Mesa, United States	6 years, 261 days
7	13.97	−0.4	(United States) Payton Payne	25 July 2015	Durham, United States	7 years, 234 days
8	13.55	+1.5	(United States) Kharisma Watkins	1 June 2019	Miramar, United States	8 years, 343 days
9	12.67	+1.7	(United States) Payton Payne	9 July 2017	Greensboro, United States	9 years, 218 days
10	12.15	+0.5	(United States) Payton Payne	26 July 2018	Greensboro, United States	10 years, 235 days
11	11.75	+1.6	(United States) Payton Payne	28 July 2019	Sacramento, United States	11 years, 237 days
12	11.75	+1.6	(United States) Payton Payne	28 July 2019	Sacramento, United States	11 years, 237 days
13	11.54	−1.2	(Jamaica) Tia Clayton	27 May 2018	Douglasville, United States	13 years, 283 days
14	11.27	+1.4	(Jamaica) Tia Clayton	29 March 2019	Kingston, Jamaica	14 years, 224 days
15	11.13	+1.7	(Jamaica) Briana Williams	17 March 2018	Jacksonville, United States	15 years, 361 days
15	11.13	+1.6	(United States) Tamari Davis	9 June 2018	Shoreline, United States	15 years, 114 days
16	10.98	+2.0	(United States) Candace Hill	20 June 2015	Shoreline, United States	16 years, 129 days
17	10.94	+0.6	(Jamaica) Briana Williams	21 June 2019	Kingston, Jamaica	17 years, 92 days
18	10.89	+1.8	(East Germany) Katrin Krabbe	20 July 1988	Berlin, East Germany	18 years, 241 days
19	10.75	+1.3	(United States) Sha'Carri Richardson	8 June 2019	Austin, United States	19 years, 75 days

== Para world records men ==
Updated June 2025

Class	Time	Wind (m/s)	Athlete	Nation	Date	Place	Ref.
T11	10.82	+1.2	Athanasios Ghavelas	Greece	2 September 2021	Tokyo	
T12	10.43	+0.2	Salum Ageze Kashafali	Norway	29 August 2021	Tokyo	
T13	10.37	+0.8	Salum Ageze Kashafali	Norway	15 June 2023	Oslo	
T32	23.25	±0.0	Martin McDonagh	Ireland	13 August 1999	Nottingham	
T33	16.24	±0.0	John Stephen	Tanzania	13 June 2003	Dar es Salaam	
T34	14.46	+0.6	Walid Ktila	Tunisia	1 June 2019	Arbon	
T35	11.39	±0.0	Dmitrii Safronov	Russia	30 August 2021	Tokyo	
T36	11.72	+0.7	James Turner	Australia	10 November 2019	Dubai	
T37	10.95	+0.3	Nick Mayhugh	United States	27 August 2021	Tokyo	
T38	10.64	+0.9	Jaydin Blackwell	United States	31 August 2024	Saint-Denis	
T42	12.04	−0.5	Anton Prokhorov	Russia	30 August 2021	Tokyo	
T43	17.00	−0.9	Achileas Stamatiadis	Greece	26 April 2025	Marrakesh	
T44	11.00	+1.1	Mpumelelo Mhlongo	South Africa	11 November 2019	Dubai	
T45	10.94	+0.2	Yohansson Nascimento	Brazil	6 September 2012	London	
T46/47	10.29	+1.8	Petrucio Ferreira dos Santos	Brazil	31 March 2022	São Paulo	
T51	19.13	+1.1	Roger Habsch	Belgium	13 February 2024	Dubai	
T52	16.01	+0.5	Maxime Carabin	Belgium	2 February 2025	Sharjah	
T53	14.10	+0.7	Brent Lakatos	Canada	27 May 2017	Arbon	
T54	13.62	±0.0	Athiwat Paeng-nuea	Thailand	24 May 2025	Nottwil	
T61	12.73	+0.9	Ali Lacin	Germany	3 July 2020	Berlin	
T62	10.54	+1.6	Johannes Floors	Germany	10 November 2019	Dubai	
T63	11.95	+1.9	Vinicius Goncalves Rodrigues	Brazil	25 April 2019	São Paulo	
T64	10.61	+1.4	Richard Browne	United States	29 October 2015	Doha	
T71	21.96	+0.8	Artur Krzyzek	Poland	24 May 2025	Nottwil	
T71	21.96	−0.6	Artur Krzyzek	Poland	2 June 2025	Paris	

== Para world records women ==
Updated November 2025

Classification	Time	Wind (m/s)	Athlete	Nation	Date	Place	Ref.
T11	11.80	+0.2	Jerusa Geber dos Santos	Brazil	2 September 2024	Saint-Denis	
T12	11.40	+0.2	Omara Durand	Cuba	9 September 2016	Rio de Janeiro	
T13	11.76	+0.3	Lamiya Valiyeva	Azerbaijan	3 September 2024	Saint-Denis	
T32	17.67	±0.0	Lindsay Wright	Great Britain	25 July 1997	Nottingham	
T33	19.89	+0.3	Shelby Watson	Great Britain	26 May 2016	Nottwil	
T34	16.31	+1.1	Hannah Cockroft	Great Britain	27 May 2023	Nottwil	
T35	13.00	+1.2	Zhou Xia	China	27 August 2021	Tokyo	
T36	13.41	+0.8	Danielle Aitchison	New Zealand	15 March 2024	Wellington	
T37	12.82	+1.0	Karen Palomeque	Colombia	13 July 2023	Paris	
T38	12.38	+1.0	Sophie Hahn	Great Britain	12 November 2019	Dubai	
T38	12.38	+0.4	Sophie Hahn	Great Britain	28 August 2021	Tokyo	
T42	14.64	+2.0	Karisma Evi Tiarani	Indonesia	27 May 2022	Nottwil	
T43	12.80	+1.0	Marlou van Rhijn	Netherlands	29 October 2015	Doha	
T44	12.72	+0.5	Irmgard Bensusan	Germany	24 May 2019	Nottwil	
T44	12.72	+1.8	Irmgard Bensusan	Germany	21 June 2019	Leverkusen	
T45	14.00	±0.0	Giselle Cole	Canada	2 June 1980	Arnhem	
T46/47	11.89	−0.2	Brittni Mason	United States	12 November 2019	Dubai	
T51	24.69	−0.8	Cassie Mitchell	United States	2 July 2016	Charlotte	
T52	18.33	+1.3	Tanja Henseler	Switzerland	27 May 2023	Nottwil	
T53	15.25	+1.2	Catherine Debrunner	Switzerland	27 May 2023	Nottwil	
T54	15.35	+1.9	Tatyana McFadden	United States	5 June 2016	Indianapolis	
T61	14.95	+1.5	Vanessa Louw	Australia	20 January 2020	Canberra	
T62	12.78	+1.0	Fleur Jong	Netherlands	21 August 2020	Leverkusen	
T63	13.98	+0.6	Ambra Sabatini	Italy	13 July 2023	Paris	
T64	12.64	+1.6	Fleur Jong	Netherlands	3 June 2021	Bydgoszcz	

== Olympic medalists ==
=== Men ===
Games	Gold	Silver	Bronze
1896 Athens	Thomas Burke; United States	Fritz Hofmann; Germany	Francis Lane; United States
1896 Athens	Thomas Burke; United States	Fritz Hofmann; Germany	Alajos Szokolyi; Hungary
1900 Paris	Frank Jarvis; United States	Walter Tewksbury; United States	Stan Rowley; Australia
1904 St. Louis	Archie Hahn; United States	Nathaniel Cartmell; United States	William Hogenson; United States
1908 London	Reggie Walker; South Africa	James Rector; United States	Robert Kerr; Canada
1912 Stockholm	Ralph Craig; United States	Alvah Meyer; United States	Donald Lippincott; United States
1920 Antwerp	Charley Paddock; United States	Morris Kirksey; United States	Harry Edward; Great Britain
1924 Paris	Harold Abrahams; Great Britain	Jackson Scholz; United States	Arthur Porritt, Baron Porritt; New Zealand
1928 Amsterdam	Percy Williams; Canada	Jack London (athlete); Great Britain	Georg Lammers; Germany
1932 Los Angeles	Eddie Tolan; United States	Ralph Metcalfe; United States	Arthur Jonath; Germany
1936 Berlin	Jesse Owens; United States	Ralph Metcalfe; United States	Tinus Osendarp; Netherlands
1948 London	Harrison Dillard; United States	Barney Ewell; United States	Lloyd LaBeach; Panama
1952 Helsinki	Lindy Remigino; United States	Herb McKenley; Jamaica	McDonald Bailey; Great Britain
1956 Melbourne	Bobby Morrow; United States	Thane Baker; United States	Hector Hogan; Australia
1960 Rome	Armin Hary; United Team of Germany	Dave Sime; United States	Peter Radford; Great Britain
1964 Tokyo	Bob Hayes; United States	Enrique Figuerola; Cuba	Harry Jerome; Canada
1968 Mexico City	Jim Hines; United States	Lennox Miller; Jamaica	Charles Greene; United States
1972 Munich	Valeriy Borzov; Soviet Union	Robert Taylor; United States	Lennox Miller; Jamaica
1976 Montreal	Hasely Crawford; Trinidad and Tobago	Don Quarrie; Jamaica	Valeriy Borzov; Soviet Union
1980 Moscow	Allan Wells; Great Britain	Silvio Leonard; Cuba	Petar Petrov; Bulgaria
1984 Los Angeles	Carl Lewis; United States	Sam Graddy; United States	Ben Johnson; Canada
1988 Seoul	Carl Lewis; United States	Linford Christie; Great Britain	Calvin Smith; United States
1992 Barcelona	Linford Christie; Great Britain	Frankie Fredericks; Namibia	Dennis Mitchell; United States
1996 Atlanta	Donovan Bailey; Canada	Frankie Fredericks; Namibia	Ato Boldon; Trinidad and Tobago
2000 Sydney	Maurice Greene; United States	Ato Boldon; Trinidad and Tobago	Obadele Thompson; Barbados
2004 Athens	Justin Gatlin; United States	Francis Obikwelu; Portugal	Maurice Greene; United States
2008 Beijing	Usain Bolt; Jamaica	Richard Thompson; Trinidad and Tobago	Walter Dix; United States
2012 London	Usain Bolt; Jamaica	Yohan Blake; Jamaica	Justin Gatlin; United States
2016 Rio de Janeiro	Usain Bolt; Jamaica	Justin Gatlin; United States	Andre De Grasse; Canada
2020 Tokyo	Marcell Jacobs; Italy	Fred Kerley; United States	Andre De Grasse; Canada
2024 Paris	Noah Lyles; United States	Kishane Thompson; Jamaica	Fred Kerley; United States
2028 Los Angeles			

=== Women ===
Games	Gold	Silver	Bronze
1928 Amsterdam	Betty Robinson; United States	Fanny Rosenfeld; Canada	Ethel Smith; Canada
1932 Los Angeles	Stanisława Walasiewicz; Poland	Hilda Strike; Canada	Wilhelmina von Bremen; United States
1936 Berlin	Helen Stephens; United States	Stanisława Walasiewicz; Poland	Käthe Krauß; Germany
1948 London	Fanny Blankers-Koen; Netherlands	Dorothy Manley; Great Britain	Shirley Strickland; Australia
1952 Helsinki	Marjorie Jackson; Australia	Daphne Hasenjäger; South Africa	Shirley Strickland de la Hunty; Australia
1956 Melbourne	Betty Cuthbert; Australia	Christa Stubnick; United Team of Germany	Marlene Mathews; Australia
1960 Rome	Wilma Rudolph; United States	Dorothy Hyman; Great Britain	Giuseppina Leone; Italy
1964 Tokyo	Wyomia Tyus; United States	Edith McGuire; United States	Ewa Kłobukowska; Poland
1968 Mexico City	Wyomia Tyus; United States	Barbara Ferrell; United States	Irena Szewińska; Poland
1972 Munich	Renate Stecher; East Germany	Raelene Boyle; Australia	Silvia Chivás; Cuba
1976 Montreal	Annegret Richter; West Germany	Renate Stecher; East Germany	Inge Helten; West Germany
1980 Moscow	Lyudmila Kondratyeva; Soviet Union	Marlies Göhr; East Germany	Ingrid Auerswald; East Germany
1984 Los Angeles	Evelyn Ashford; United States	Alice Brown; United States	Merlene Ottey; Jamaica
1988 Seoul	Florence Griffith Joyner; United States	Evelyn Ashford; United States	Heike Drechsler; East Germany
1992 Barcelona	Gail Devers; United States	Juliet Cuthbert; Jamaica	Irina Privalova; Unified Team
1996 Atlanta	Gail Devers; United States	Merlene Ottey; Jamaica	Gwen Torrence; United States
2000 Sydney	Vacant	Ekaterini Thanou; Greece	Merlene Ottey; Jamaica
2000 Sydney	Vacant	Tayna Lawrence; Jamaica	Merlene Ottey; Jamaica
2004 Athens	Yulia Nestsiarenka; Belarus	Lauryn Williams; United States	Veronica Campbell; Jamaica
2008 Beijing	Shelly-Ann Fraser; Jamaica	Sherone Simpson; Jamaica	none awarded
2008 Beijing	Shelly-Ann Fraser; Jamaica	Kerron Stewart; Jamaica	none awarded
2012 London	Shelly-Ann Fraser-Pryce; Jamaica	Carmelita Jeter; United States	Veronica Campbell-Brown; Jamaica
2016 Rio de Janeiro	Elaine Thompson; Jamaica	Tori Bowie; United States	Shelly-Ann Fraser-Pryce; Jamaica
2020 Tokyo	Elaine Thompson-Herah; Jamaica	Shelly-Ann Fraser-Pryce; Jamaica	Shericka Jackson; Jamaica
2024 Paris	Julien Alfred; Saint Lucia	Sha'Carri Richardson; United States	Melissa Jefferson; United States
2028 Los Angeles			

== World Championships medalists ==
=== Men ===
Championships	Gold	Silver	Bronze
1983 Helsinki	Carl Lewis (USA)	Calvin Smith (USA)	Emmit King (USA)
1987 Rome	Carl Lewis (USA)	Raymond Stewart (JAM)	Linford Christie (GBR)
1991 Tokyo	Carl Lewis (USA)	Leroy Burrell (USA)	Dennis Mitchell (USA)
1993 Stuttgart	Linford Christie (GBR)	Andre Cason (USA)	Dennis Mitchell (USA)
1995 Gothenburg	Donovan Bailey (CAN)	Bruny Surin (CAN)	Ato Boldon (TRI)
1997 Athens	Maurice Greene (USA)	Donovan Bailey (CAN)	Tim Montgomery (USA)
1999 Seville	Maurice Greene (USA)	Bruny Surin (CAN)	Dwain Chambers (GBR)
2001 Edmonton	Maurice Greene (USA)	Bernard Williams (USA)	Ato Boldon (TRI)
2003 Saint-Denis	Kim Collins (SKN)	Darrel Brown (TRI)	Darren Campbell (GBR)
2005 Helsinki	Justin Gatlin (USA)	Michael Frater (JAM)	Kim Collins (SKN)
2007 Osaka	Tyson Gay (USA)	Derrick Atkins (BAH)	Asafa Powell (JAM)
2009 Berlin	Usain Bolt (JAM)	Tyson Gay (USA)	Asafa Powell (JAM)
2011 Daegu	Yohan Blake (JAM)	Walter Dix (USA)	Kim Collins (SKN)
2013 Moscow	Usain Bolt (JAM)	Justin Gatlin (USA)	Nesta Carter (JAM)
2015 Beijing	Usain Bolt (JAM)	Justin Gatlin (USA)	Trayvon Bromell (USA) Andre De Grasse (CAN)
2017 London	Justin Gatlin (USA)	Christian Coleman (USA)	Usain Bolt (JAM)
2019 Doha	Christian Coleman (USA)	Justin Gatlin (USA)	Andre De Grasse (CAN)
2022 Eugene	Fred Kerley (USA)	Marvin Bracy (USA)	Trayvon Bromell (USA)
2023 Budapest	Noah Lyles (USA)	Letsile Tebogo (BOT)	Zharnel Hughes (GBR)
2025 Tokyo	Oblique Seville (JAM)	Kishane Thompson (JAM)	Noah Lyles (USA)

==== Medalists by country ====
Rank	Nation	Gold	Silver	Bronze	Total
1	United States (USA)	12	11	7	30
2	Jamaica (JAM)	5	3	4	12
3	Canada (CAN)	1	3	2	6
4	Great Britain (GBR)	1	0	4	5
5	Saint Kitts and Nevis (SKN)	1	0	2	3
6	Trinidad and Tobago (TRI)	0	1	2	3
7	Bahamas (BAH)	0	1	0	1
7	Botswana (BOT)	0	1	0	1

=== Women ===
Championships	Gold	Silver	Bronze
1983 Helsinki	Marlies Oelsner-Göhr (GDR)	Marita Koch (GDR)	Diane Williams (USA)
1987 Rome	Silke Gladisch-Möller (GDR)	Heike Daute-Drechsler (GDR)	Merlene Ottey (JAM)
1991 Tokyo	Katrin Krabbe (GER)	Gwen Torrence (USA)	Merlene Ottey (JAM)
1993 Stuttgart	Gail Devers (USA)	Merlene Ottey (JAM)	Gwen Torrence (USA)
1995 Gothenburg	Gwen Torrence (USA)	Merlene Ottey (JAM)	Irina Privalova (RUS)
1997 Athens	Marion Jones (USA)	Zhanna Pintusevich (UKR)	Savatheda Fynes (BAH)
1999 Seville	Marion Jones (USA)	Inger Miller (USA)	Ekaterini Thanou (GRE)
2001 Edmonton	Zhanna Pintusevich-Block (UKR)	Ekaterini Thanou (GRE)	Chandra Sturrup (BAH)
2003 Saint-Denis	Torri Edwards (USA)	Chandra Sturrup (BAH)	Ekaterini Thanou (GRE)
2005 Helsinki	Lauryn Williams (USA)	Veronica Campbell (JAM)	Christine Arron (FRA)
2007 Osaka	Veronica Campbell-Brown (JAM)	Lauryn Williams (USA)	Carmelita Jeter (USA)
2009 Berlin	Shelly-Ann Fraser (JAM)	Kerron Stewart (JAM)	Carmelita Jeter (USA)
2011 Daegu	Carmelita Jeter (USA)	Veronica Campbell-Brown (JAM)	Kelly-Ann Baptiste (TRI)
2013 Moscow	Shelly-Ann Fraser-Pryce (JAM)	Murielle Ahouré (CIV)	Carmelita Jeter (USA)
2015 Beijing	Shelly-Ann Fraser-Pryce (JAM)	Dafne Schippers (NED)	Tori Bowie (USA)
2017 London	Tori Bowie (USA)	Marie Josée Ta Lou (CIV)	Dafne Schippers (NED)
2019 Doha	Shelly-Ann Fraser-Pryce (JAM)	Dina Asher-Smith (GBR)	Marie Josée Ta Lou (CIV)
2022 Eugene	Shelly-Ann Fraser-Pryce (JAM)	Shericka Jackson (JAM)	Elaine Thompson-Herah (JAM)
2023 Budapest	Sha'Carri Richardson (USA)	Shericka Jackson (JAM)	Shelly-Ann Fraser-Pryce (JAM)
2025 Tokyo	Melissa Jefferson-Wooden (USA)	Tina Clayton (JAM)	Julien Alfred (LCA)

==== Medalists by country ====
Rank	Nation	Gold	Silver	Bronze	Total
1	United States (USA)	10	3	6	19
2	Jamaica (JAM)	6	8	4	18
3	East Germany (GDR)	2	2	0	4
4	Ukraine (UKR)	1	1	0	2
5	Germany (GER)	1	0	0	1
6	Ivory Coast (CIV)	0	2	1	3
7	Bahamas (BAH)	0	1	2	3
7	Greece (GRE)	0	1	2	3
9	Netherlands (NED)	0	1	1	2
10	Great Britain (GBR)	0	1	0	1
11	France (FRA)	0	0	1	1
11	Russia (RUS)	0	0	1	1
11	Saint Lucia (LCA)	0	0	1	1
11	Trinidad and Tobago (TRI)	0	0	1	1

== See also ==
- 100-yard dash
- National records in the 100 metres
- List of 100 metres national champions (men)
- List of 100 metres national champions (women)
- 2018 in 100 metres
- 2019 in 100 metres
- 2020 in 100 metres
- 2021 in 100 metres
- 2022 in 100 metres
