= Trentavis Friday =

American sprinter

Personal information
- Nationality: American
- Born: June 5, 1995 (age 31) Cherryville, North Carolina, U.S.
- Height: 6 ft 2 in (1.88 m)
- Weight: 165 lb (75 kg)

Sport
- Sport: Track and Field
- Event: Sprints
- College team: Florida State Seminoles
- Club: Gastonia Jaguars Track Club

Achievements and titles
- Personal bests: 100 m: 10.00 (Eugene 2014); 200 m: 20.04 (Eugene 2014)
Medal record
Men's athletics
Representing the United States
World Junior Championships
| Gold medal – first place | 2014 Oregon | 200 m |
| Gold medal – first place | 2014 Oregon | 4×100 m relay |

Trentavis Friday (born June 5, 1995) is an American track and field athlete specializing in sprinting events. He is the USA Men's High School Record Holder in the 100 metres.

A native of Gastonia, North Carolina, Friday attended Cherryville High School. He then attended Florida State University for one year, before turning professional by signing a four-year contract with Xtep in November 2015, in order to prepare for the 2016 Summer Olympics. At the 2016 U.S. Olympic Trials, Friday finished fifth in his preliminary.

Friday was named Gatorade National Track & Field Athlete in 2014. He was also Track and Field News "High School Athlete of the Year."

Awards
| Preceded by Rudy Winkler | Track & Field News High School Boys Athlete of the Year; 2014 | Succeeded by Noah Lyles |
Records
| Preceded by Jeffery Demps | USA Men's High School Record Holder, 100 metres 5 July 2014 – present | Incumbent |
