= Sorato Shimizu =

Japanese sprinter (born 2009)

Personal information
- Native name: Shimizu Sorato (清水空跳)
- Born: 8 February 2009 (age 17)
- Height: 1.64 m (5 ft 5 in)

Sport
- Country: Japan
- Sport: Athletics
- Event: Sprint

Achievements and titles
- Personal bests: 100 m: 10.00 (Hiroshima 2025) WU18R; 200 m: 20.97 (Hiroshima 2025)
Medal record
Men's athletics
Representing Japan
Asian U18 Athletics Championships
Gold medal – first place	2025 Dammam	100 m
East Asian U20 Championship
Silver medal – second place	2025 Wan Chai	100 m
Gold medal – first place	2025 Wan Chai	4×100 m relay

Sorato Shimizu (Japanese: 清水空跳, Hepburn: Shimizu Sorato; born 8 February 2009) is a Japanese sprinter. He was a gold medalist in the 100 metres at the 2025 Asian U18 Athletics Championships. In July 2025, he ran a world under-18 best time for the 100 metres at the age of 16 years old.

== Biography ==
Shimizu was a student at Seiryo High School in the Ishikawa Prefecture, Japan, when he ran 10.37 seconds in the 100 metres at the Japanese Inter High School Championship in 2024. He won the 100 metres at the 2025 Asian U18 Athletics Championships in Dammam, Saudi Arabia, in April 2025, running 10.38 seconds (+2.3).

He improved his time for the 100 metres to 10.19 seconds whilst competing in July 2025. Later that month, whilst competing in Japan’s Inter High School Championship in Hiroshima at the age of 16 years-old, he won his 100 metres race in 10.00 seconds. The second-placed athlete ran 10.27 seconds, giving him a winning margin of nearly three tenths of a second in the race. With the time of 10.00 seconds, he broke the previous u18 world best time of 10.06 seconds held jointly by Puripol Boonson of Thailand and American sprinter Christian Miller. The time also broke the Japanese high school record of 10.01 seconds set by Yoshihide Kiryu in 2013, and also met the minimum standard for the upcoming 2025 World Championships, due to be held in Tokyo. The time also moved him to joint-fifth on the Japanese senior all-time list. He was named as part of the Japanese relay team for the 2025 World Athletics Championships.

Records
Preceded by (United States) Christian Miller (Thailand) Puripol Boonson	Boys' World Youth Best Holder, 100 metres 26 July 2025 – present	Succeeded by Incumbent
