= 2016 IAAF World U20 Championships – Men's 400 metres =

The men's 400 metres event at the 2016 IAAF World U20 Championships was held at Zdzisław Krzyszkowiak Stadium on 20, 21 and 22 July.

== Medalists ==
| Gold | Abdalelah Haroun; Qatar |
| Silver | Wilbert London III; United States |
| Bronze | Karabo Sibanda; Botswana |

== Records ==
Standing records prior to the 2016 IAAF World U20 Championships in Athletics
| World Junior Record | Steve Lewis (USA) | 43.87 | Seoul, South Korea | 28 September 1988 |
| Championship Record | Hamdan Odha Al-Bishi (KSA) | 44.66 | Santiago, Chile | 20 October 2000 |
| World Junior Leading | Baboloki Thebe (BOT) | 44.22 | Gaborone, Botswana | 21 May 2016 |

== Results ==
=== Heats ===
Qualification: First 3 of each heat (Q) and the 6 fastest times (q) qualified for the semifinals.

| Rank | Heat | Name | Nationality | Time | Note |
|---|---|---|---|---|---|
| 1 | 1 | Geoffrey Kiprotich Rono | Kenya | 46.23 | Q, PB |
| 2 | 3 | Baboloki Thebe | Botswana | 46.25 | Q |
| 3 | 6 | Karabo Sibanda | Botswana | 46.34 | Q |
| 4 | 5 | Kahmari Montgomery | United States | 46.46 | Q |
| 5 | 4 | Abdalelah Haroun | Qatar | 46.51 | Q |
| 6 | 2 | Christopher Taylor | Jamaica | 46.73 | Q |
| 7 | 5 | Myles Banfield | Canada | 46.77 | Q, PB |
| 8 | 2 | Kazuki Matsukiyo | Japan | 46.78 | Q |
| 9 | 6 | Jamal Walton | Cayman Islands | 46.83 | Q |
| 10 | 4 | Sean Bailey | Jamaica | 46.83 | Q |
| 11 | 4 | Cameron Chalmers | Great Britain | 46.91 | Q |
| 12 | 6 | Iván Núñez | Mexico | 46.96 | Q |
| 13 | 3 | Luis Charles | Dominican Republic | 47.09 | Q |
| 14 | 6 | Edwin Ngeeti | Kenya | 47.11 | q |
| 15 | 2 | Anthony Zambrano | Colombia | 47.18 | Q |
| 16 | 2 | Tymoteusz Zimny | Poland | 47.20 | q |
| 17 | 1 | Wilbert London III | United States | 47.23 | Q |
| 18 | 2 | Taha Hussein Yaseen | Iraq | 47.31 | q |
| 19 | 3 | Naoki Kitadani | Japan | 47.32 | Q |
| 20 | 1 | Moussa Ali Issa | Bahrain | 47.39 | Q |
| 21 | 6 | Vladimir Aceti | Italy | 47.62 | q |
| 22 | 5 | Wu Yuang | China | 47.65 | Q |
| 23 | 2 | Jochem Dobber | Netherlands | 47.67 | q |
| 24 | 6 | David Šalamon | Croatia | 47.79 | q |
| 25 | 1 | Mo Il-hwan | South Korea | 47.82 | |
| 26 | 4 | Nathan Friginette | Canada | 47.91 | |
| 27 | 3 | Brayan Lopez | Italy | 47.92 | |
| 28 | 1 | Mihai Cristian Pislaru | Romania | 48.01 | |
| 29 | 5 | Derrick Mokaleng | South Africa | 48.04 | |
| 30 | 4 | Henri Delauze | Bahamas | 48.15 | |
| 31 | 5 | Lawson Power | Australia | 48.36 | |
| 32 | 6 | Joshua St. Clair | Trinidad and Tobago | 48.39 | |
| 33 | 5 | Charles Devantay | Switzerland | 48.42 | |
| 34 | 3 | Kinard Rolle | Bahamas | 48.60 | |
| 35 | 6 | Andile Lusenga | Swaziland | 48.67 | |
| 36 | 2 | Vitsanu Phosri | Thailand | 49.30 | SB |
| 37 | 1 | Gezahegn Ababu | Ethiopia | 49.54 | |
| 38 | 4 | Kashief King | Trinidad and Tobago | 50.06 | |
| 39 | 2 | Alessandro Gasperoni | San Marino | 50.48 | |
| | 3 | Dawid Kapała | Poland | DNF | |
| | 1 | Samson Oghenewegba Nathaniel | Nigeria | DNS | |
| | 3 | Gemechu Alemu | Ethiopia | DNS | |
| | 4 | Ojo Sunday Fatoyinbo | Nigeria | DNS | |
| | 5 | Abdallah Djimet Souleyman | Saudi Arabia | DNS | |

=== Semifinals ===
Qualification: First 2 of each heat (Q) and the 2 fastest times (q) qualified for the final.

| Rank | Heat | Name | Nationality | Time | Note |
|---|---|---|---|---|---|
| 1 | 1 | Karabo Sibanda | Botswana | 45.15 | Q |
| 2 | 3 | Geoffrey Kiprotich Rono | Kenya | 45.38 | Q |
| 3 | 3 | Wilbert London III | United States | 45.49 | Q |
| 4 | 2 | Abdalelah Haroun | Qatar | 45.55 | Q |
| 5 | 1 | Kahmari Montgomery | United States | 45.71 | Q |
| 6 | 1 | Anthony Zambrano | Colombia | 45.81 | q, PB |
| 7 | 1 | Naoki Kitadani | Japan | 46.41 | q, PB |
| 8 | 3 | Cameron Chalmers | Great Britain | 46.51 | |
| 9 | 3 | Christopher Taylor | Jamaica | 46.60 | |
| 10 | 1 | Jamal Walton | Cayman Islands | 46.61 | |
| 11 | 2 | Kazuki Matsukiyo | Japan | 46.69 | Q |
| 12 | 3 | Wu Yuang | China | 46.83 | |
| 13 | 2 | Iván Núñez | Mexico | 47.00 | |
| 14 | 1 | Sean Bailey | Jamaica | 47.09 | |
| 15 | 3 | Tymoteusz Zimny | Poland | 47.14 | PB |
| 16 | 2 | Jochem Dobber | Netherlands | 47.22 | |
| 17 | 1 | Taha Hussein Yaseen | Iraq | 47.26 | |
| 18 | 2 | Luis Charles | Dominican Republic | 47.33 | |
| 19 | 1 | Vladimir Aceti | Italy | 47.41 | |
| 20 | 3 | Myles Banfield | Canada | 47.46 | |
| 21 | 2 | Edwin Ngeeti | Kenya | 47.51 | |
| 22 | 3 | David Šalamon | Croatia | 47.51 | PB |
| | 2 | Baboloki Thebe | Botswana | DQ | R163.3(a) |
| | 2 | Moussa Ali Issa | Bahrain | DNS | |

=== Final ===
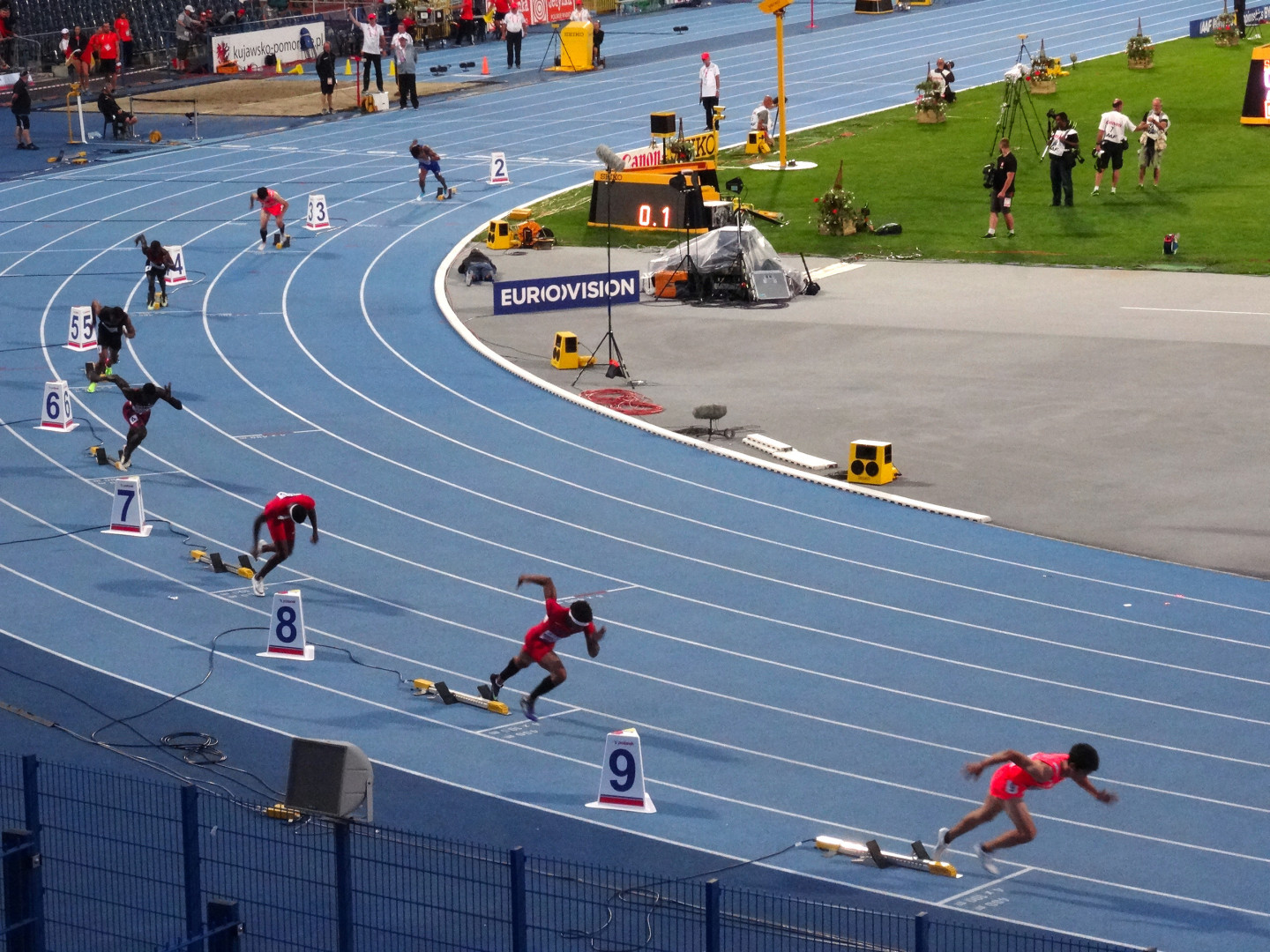
The final

| Rank | Lane | Name | Nationality | Time | Note |
|---|---|---|---|---|---|
| 1st place, gold medalist(s) | 6 | Abdalelah Haroun | Qatar | 44.81 | SB |
| 2nd place, silver medalist(s) | 7 | Wilbert London III | United States | 45.27 | PB |
| 3rd place, bronze medalist(s) | 5 | Karabo Sibanda | Botswana | 45.45 | |
| 4 | 4 | Geoffrey Kiprotich Rono | Kenya | 45.64 | |
| 5 | 8 | Kahmari Montgomery | United States | 46.48 | |
| 6 | 2 | Anthony Zambrano | Colombia | 46.50 | |
| 7 | 9 | Kazuki Matsukiyo | Japan | 46.69 | PB |
| 8 | 3 | Naoki Kitadani | Japan | 47.15 | |
