= Geoffrey Kiprotich Rono =

Kenyan sprinter

Geoffrey Kiprotich Rono (born 23 November 1997) is a Kenyan track and field sprinter. He finished fourth in the 400 metres at the 2016 IAAF World U20 Championships at Zdzisław Krzyszkowiak Stadium in Poland. He also competed at the 2014 World Junior Championships in Athletics in the 200 metres and the 2017 IAAF World Relays in the 4 × 400 metres relay.
