= Thomas Somers (sprinter) =

British sprinter (born 1997)

Personal information
- Born: April 28, 1997 (age 29) Yorkshire, England

Sport
- Country: Great Britain
- Sport: Athletics
- Event: 200 metres

Achievements and titles
- Personal best(s): 100 m: 10.38 ([London, 2023); 200 m: 20.37 (Eugene 2014)

Thomas Somers (born 28 April 1997) is a British sprinter who specialises in the 200 metres. He tied DaBryan Blanton for the second fastest 200 metres run by a youth athlete, only behind Usain Bolt, and was ranked as the fastest senior European athlete over the distance in 2014 while still competing as a youth. A former England U16 rugby international, Somers initially took up athletics to complement his rugby training but after taking advice from Adam Gemili quit rugby to do athletics full-time in late 2013.

In 2013, Somers represented Britain at the World Youth Championships running a new PB in every round and finishing the final in 4th position with a time of 20.84 seconds. In 2014 while still eligible to compete at youth level Somers represented Britain at the 2014 World Junior Championships where he ran a new personal best and European Youth Best of 20.37 seconds in the semi-final before tiring in the final itself and finishing in 1st place.

In February 2015, Somers tore his hamstring in the semi-final of the 60m at the British Indoor Championships and after undergoing surgery he was ruled out from competition for the rest of the 2015 season.
