= Christian Miller (sprinter) =

American athlete (born 2006)

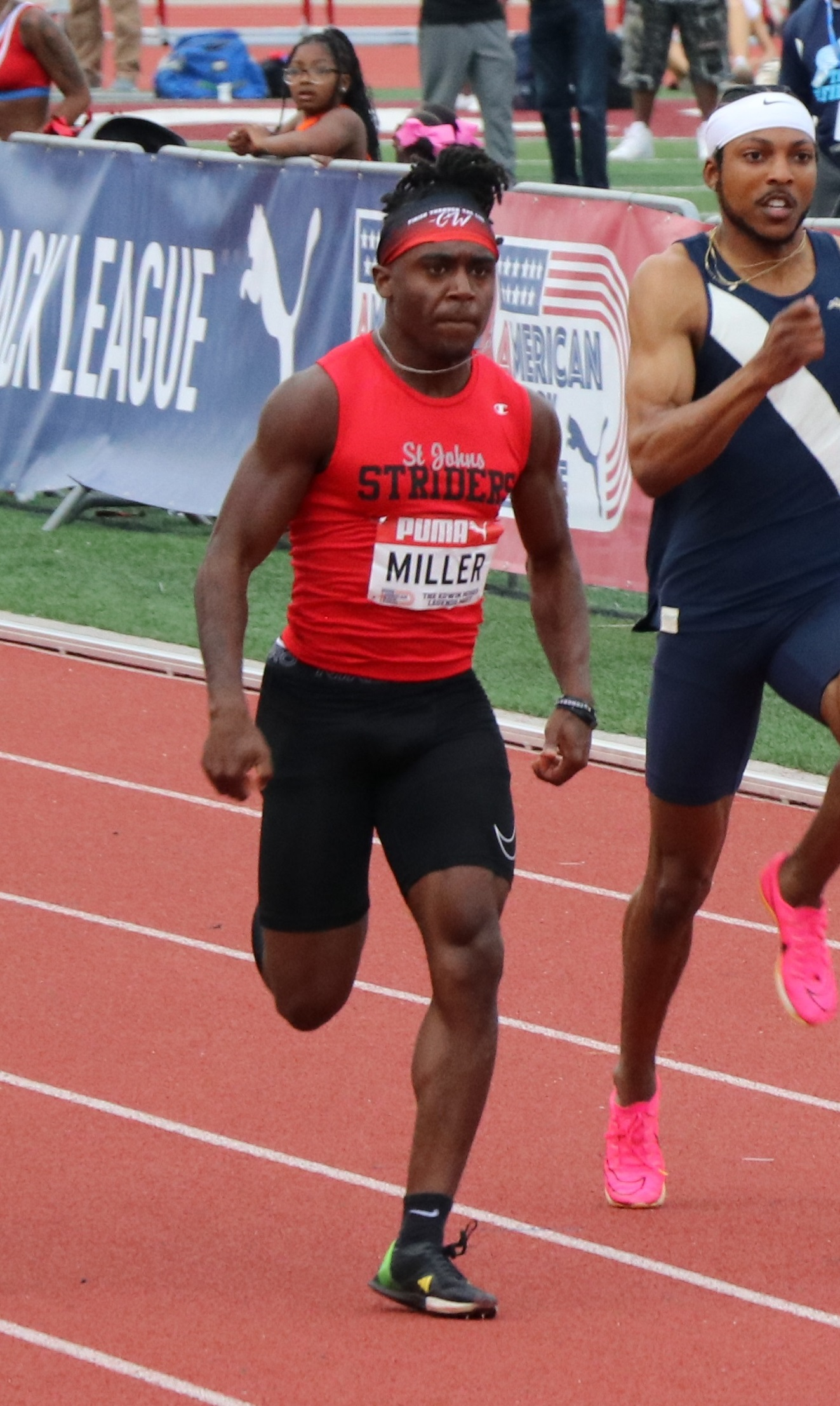
- Miller in 2024

Personal information
- Born: 16 May 2006 (age 20) St. Johns County, Florida, United States

Sport
- Sport: Athletics
- Event: Sprint

Achievements and titles
- Personal bests: 60m: 7.18 (Colorado Springs, 2024); 100m: 9.93 (Clermont, 2024); 200m: 20.51 (Eugene, 2023)

Christian Miller (born 16 May 2006) is an American track and field athlete who competes as a sprinter. In July 2023, he ran 10.06 seconds for the 100 metres, an U18 World Record. The following season, he lowered his personal best to 9.93 seconds.

== Early life ==
Miller is from St. Johns County, Florida, where he attended Creekside High School. In November 2023, he signed a letter of intent to join the University of Georgia.

== Career ==
In 2023, he became the USATF U20 champion in the 100m and 200m running times of 10.06 seconds and 20.51 seconds to win each, respectively. His 100m time was a junior class record and the fourth-fastest time in high school history. His 100m time overtook Puripol Boonson to set the U18 world record.

In April 2024, he ran a wind-legal 9.93 seconds for the 100 metres in Florida at the age of 17 years-old, breaking the previous American U20 record of 9.97 set by Trayvon Bromell in June 2014.

On October 15, 2024, Miller announced that he has signed a professional contract with Puma to forgo his collegiate career. In May 2025, he ran the 100 metres at the Golden Grand Prix in Tokyo in 10.08 seconds to finish behind Hiroki Yanagita and ahead of compatriot Christian Coleman. That month, he was named as a challenger for the short sprints category at the 2025 Grand Slam Track event in Philadelphia. He reached the semi-finals of the 100 metres at the 2025 USA Outdoor Track and Field Championships.

Grand Slam Track results
Slam	Race group	Event	Pl.	Time	Prize money
2025 Philadelphia Slam	Short sprints	200 m	8th	20.73	US$10,000
2025 Philadelphia Slam	Short sprints	100 m		DNS	US$10,000

Records
Preceded by (Thailand) Puripol Boonson	Boys' World Youth Best Holder, 100 metres 8 July 2023 – 26 July 2025 (shared with (Thailand) Puripol Boonson from 30 September 2023)	Succeeded by (Japan) Sorato Shimizu
