= 2025 Asian U18 Athletics Championships =

6th Asian U18 Athletics Championships
- Dates: 15–18 April 2025
- Host city: Qatif, Saudi Arabia
- Venue: Prince Nayef Sports City
- Level: U18 (Youth)
- Events: 39
- Participation: 31 nations

The 2025 Asian U18 Athletics Championships was the sixth edition of the biennial, continental athletics competition for Asian athletes aged 15 to 17. It was held at Prince Nayef Sports City in Qatif, Saudi Arabia, from 15 to 18 April 2025.

== Medal summary ==
=== Men ===
Event	Gold		Silver		Bronze	
100 metres (wind: +2.3 m/s)	Sorato Shimizu; Japan	10.38	Hongyu Dai; China	10.39	Cheuk Fung Jasper Koo; Hong Kong	10.40
200 metres (wind: +1.5 m/s)	Cheuk Fung Jasper Koo; Hong Kong	20.95 CR	Chae-min Jun; South Korea	21.01	Harry Irfan Curran; Singapore	21.24
400 metres	Yongjie Li; China	48.11	Samer Moosa Hassan; Qatar	48.22	Haroun Ahmat; Qatar	48.30
800 metres	Zeng Xiang; China	1:53.31	Abdullatif Mohammed; Kuwait	1:53.33	H. D. S. Awishka; Sri Lanka	1:53.41
1500 metres	Mubarik Abdi Said; Qatar	3:57.90	Mahmoud Abou Zeid; Lebanon	3:58.76	Lahiru Achintha; Sri Lanka	3:59.47
3000 metres	Mohammad Saleh Kamareh; Iran	8:37.55	Timur Nasimov; Uzbekistan	8:51.27	Asilbek Tukhtamurodov; Uzbekistan	9:01.95
110 metres hurdles (91.4 cm) (wind: +2.5 m/s)	Koki Takajo; Japan	13.42	Hasan Hagawi; Saudi Arabia	13.49	Jhih-Cun Lei; Chinese Taipei	13.50
400 metres hurdles (84.0 cm)	Idriss Djibren Mahamat Abdei; Qatar	52.24	Idriss Abakar; Qatar	53.56	Kiril Savchenko; Kazakhstan	53.63
2000 metres Steeplechase (0.84)	Hashem Ahmed Hakeem; Saudi Arabia	6:06.06	Shokhjakhon Khayrullaev; Uzbekistan	6:14.31	Li Guanxi; China	6:14.33
5000 metres race walk	Ninghao Zhu; China	20:21.50 CR	Nitin Gupta; India	20:21.51	Sheng-Chin Lo; Chinese Taipei	21:37.88
1000 metres sprint medley relay	China (CHN): Hongyu Dai; Jiacheng Hu; Kangbin Liu; Yongjie Li	1:51.68 CR	India (IND): P. Chiranth; Sayed Sabeer; Kadir Khan; Saket Minj	1:52.15	Saudi Arabia (KSA): Mubarak Salem Alyami; Meshal Abdullah Hazazi; Musaad Obaid Al-subaie; Abdullah Nasser Aljarian	1:52.36
High jump	Mohammad Alduaij; Kuwait	2.05 m	Devak Bhushan; India	2.03 m	Pawan Nethya Sampath; Sri Lanka	2.03 m
Pole vault	Khalel Zaid; Singapore	4.20 m	Abdulla Saad Al-abdulla; Qatar	4.20 m	Dmitriy Shkerdin; Kazakhstan	4.20 m
Long jump	Chengyi Zhou; China	7.73 m	Eito Omori; Japan	7.72 m	Liu Bingchen; China	7.30 m
Triple jump	Zhiyuan Dong; China	15.53 m	Janith Lakshan; Sri Lanka	15.10 m	Ma Boyu; China	14.97 m
Shot put (5 kg)	Qigeng Han; China	20.23 m	Nishchay; India	19.59 m	Anson Loh; Singapore	18.59 m
Discus throw (1.5 kg)	Qigeng Han; China	63.33 m	Xuan Wanzhi; China	63.01 m	Nishchay; India	58.85 m
Javelin throw (700 g)	Himanshu Jakhar; India	67.57 m	Hao Lu; China	63.45 m	Ruslan Sadullayev; Uzbekistan	61.96 m
Decathlon	Jakhongir Juraboev; Uzbekistan	6645 pts	Askar Omirzak; Kazakhstan	6524 pts	Abas Moneer Alabdulbaqi; Saudi Arabia	6229 pts

=== Women ===
Event	Gold		Silver		Bronze	
100 metres (wind: +1.4 m/s)	Qian Zhang; China	11.80	Dananjana Fernando; Sri Lanka	11.92	Aarti; India	11.93
200 metres (wind: +1.4 m/s)	Mariam Kareem; United Arab Emirates	23.99	Misato Shibata; Japan	24.16	Aarti; India	24.31
400 metres	Saki Imamine; Japan	57.27	Tannu; India	57.63	Nanxi Deng; China	58.01
800 metres	Tharushi Abisheka; Sri Lanka	2:14.86	Meiling Ye; China	2:15.92	Naomi Marjorie Cesar; Philippines	2:17.87
1500 metres	Zhang Yaxi; China	4:58.35	Sama Mostafa; Lebanon	4:58.82	Marjona Saydullaeva; Uzbekistan	4:59.85
3000 metres	Anastasiya Silchenkova; Uzbekistan	9:45.17	Zhuoma Suolang; China	10:00.44	Samia Shahpari; Iran	10:09.07
100 metres hurdles (76.2cm) (wind: +2.4 m/s)	Yinyin Bao; China	13.71	He Yihui; China	13.76	Shourya Ambure; India	13.80
400 metres hurdles	Mariam Kareem; United Arab Emirates	59.55 CR	Shodiyona Rakhmonova; Uzbekistan	1:01.40	Evelina Ryabkova; Kazakhstan	1:01.59
2000 metres steeplechase	Sadafbonu Nusratilleva; Uzbekistan	6:44.99 CR	Nasimakhon Mamirova; Uzbekistan	6:55.20	Wen Fu; China	7:09.11
5000 metres race walk	Yaru Wang; China	23:34.80	Zhuoma Xiere; China	23:51.59	Seo-Rhin Kwon; South Korea	24:13.70
1000 metres sprint medley relay	China (CHN): Qian Zhang; Sitong Yang; Zhenglin Zhou; Beiqi He	2:11.11	Sri Lanka (SRI): Dananjana Fernando; Tharushi Abisheka; Sansala Himashani; Dilki Nehara	1:52.15	Thailand (THA): Chanthell Mauricette; Nichaphat Nunut; Panramon Tangsatjakul; Nattawadee Watarujikrit	1:52.36
High jump	Jialing Dong; China	1.73 m	Mai Ngoc Anh; Vietnam	1.69 m	Yasmeen Roy; Kuwait	1.65 m
Pole vault	Not held					
Long jump	Morong Liang; China	6.26 m	Chloe En-ya Chee; Singapore	5.77 m	Ye-ji Seo; South Korea	5.66 m
Triple jump	Yiqing Xie; China	13.39 m	Jiayu Bi; China	12.79 m	Dilki Nehara; Sri Lanka	12.35 m
Shot put (3kg)	Xinyao Chen; China	18.47 m	Yuxuan Wan; China	17.82 m	Yae-ram Lee; South Korea	16.58 m
Discus throw	Chenyi Ma; China	53.81 m CR	Anqi Zhao; China	47.89 m	Lakshita Mahlawat; India	41.30 m
Hammer throw (3kg)	Jiajun Chen; China	67.71 m	Yujia Gao; China	64.20 m	Shahribonu Zaripova; Uzbekistan	56.47 m
Javelin throw (500g)	Yan Yi Kwan; Hong Kong	54.04 m	Ayuto Kurokawa; Japan	49.92 m	Ao Matsuyama; Japan	49.76 m
Heptathlon	Polina Kuzubova; Kazakhstan	5089 pts	Sofya Nikolaeva; Uzbekistan	4904 pts	Assylzat Kydyrbay; Kazakhstan	4355 pts

== Medal table ==
* Host nation (Saudi Arabia)

Rank	Nation	Gold	Silver	Bronze	Total
1	China	19	12	5	36
2	Uzbekistan	3	5	4	12
3	Japan	3	3	1	7
4	Saudi Arabia*	3	1	2	6
5	Qatar	2	3	1	6
6	Hong Kong	2	0	1	3
7	United Arab Emirates	2	0	0	2
8	India	1	5	5	11
9	Sri Lanka	1	3	4	8
10	Singapore	1	2	2	5
11	Kuwait	1	1	1	3
12	Kazakhstan	1	0	4	5
13	Iran	1	0	2	3
14	Lebanon	0	2	0	2
15	South Korea	0	1	3	4
16	Vietnam	0	1	0	1
17	Chinese Taipei	0	0	2	2
18	Philippines	0	0	1	1
18	Thailand	0	0	1	1
Totals (19 entries)		40	39	39	118

== Participating nations ==
1. Afghanistan
2. China
3. Chinese Taipei
4. Hong Kong
5. India
6. Iran
7. Iraq
8. Japan
9. Jordan
10. Kazakhstan
11. South Korea
12. Kuwait
13. Kyrgyzstan
14. Lebanon
15. Macau
16. Malaysia
17. Maldives
18. Oman
19. Palestine
20. Philippines
21. Qatar
22. Saudi Arabia (Host)
23. Singapore
24. Sri Lanka
25. Syria
26. Tajikistan
27. Thailand
28. United Arab Emirates
29. Uzbekistan
30. Vietnam
31. Yemen

Preceded by 2023; Uzbekistan	6th Asian U18 Athletics Championships; 2025; Saudi Arabia	Succeeded by 2027; TBA
