= Athletics at the 2026 Asian Games – Men's 100 metres =

Men's 100 metres at the 2026 Asian Games
- Venue: Nagoya City Mizuho Park Athletic Stadium
- Dates: 24 September 2026 (round 1); 25 September 2026 (semi-finals & final)
- Competitors: 38 from 24 nations
- Winning time: 9.90 GR

Medalists
gold medal	Puripol Boonson	Thailand
silver medal	Ali Anwar Al-Balushi	Oman
bronze medal	Malham Al-Balushi	Oman

The men's 100 metres competition at the 2026 Asian Games took place on 24 and 25 September 2026 at the Nagoya City Mizuho Park Athletic Stadium in Nagoya, Japan. In total, 38 athletes from 25 countries took part in the event.

Puripol Boonson of Thailand won the gold medal in a Games record time of 9.90 s. Ali Anwar Al-Balushi and Malham Al-Balushi, both of Oman, won the silver and bronze medals, respectively.

Boonson, who had won the silver medal in the event at the 2022 Asian Games, ran 9.95 s in the first round before breaking Su Bingtian's previous Games record of 9.92 s with a time of 9.91 s in the semifinal. He lowered the record again to 9.90 s in the final.

== Background ==
The atletics events were held at the Nagoya City Mizuho Park Athletic Stadium in Nagoya, Japan from 23 to 29 September 2026.

Xie Zhenye of China was the defending champion after winning the gold medal at the 2022 Asian Games in Hangzhou.

== Round 1 ==
The heats took place on 24 September at 8.08pm. The three fastest athletes from each heat plus the next six fastest advanced to the semi-finals. Puripol Boonson set the fastest time (9.95 s) in the first round and was the only athlete to run sub-10 s. Other medal contenders Ali Anwar Al-Balushi ran 10.06 s and Muhd Azeem Fahmi ran 10.17 s.

=== Heat 1 ===
Place	Athlete	Nation	Time	Notes
1	Puripol Boonson	Thailand	9.95	Q, SB
2	Zeng Keli	China	10.22	Q
3	Animesh Kujur	India	10.36	Q
4	Muhammad Umaira	Malaysia	10.43	q, PB
5	Jo Kum-ryong	North Korea	10.55	q
6	Ibadulla Adam	Maldives	11.06	SB
7	Mouzinho Belo	Timor-Leste	11.68	
			Wind: (−0.2 m/s)	

=== Heat 2 ===
Place	Athlete	Nation	Time	Notes
1	Joeljin Nwamadi	South Korea	10.23	Q
2	Yuki Koike	Japan	10.33 [.321]	Q
3	Chen Wen-pu	Chinese Taipei	10.33 [.328]	Q
4	Sulton Gafurjonov	Uzbekistan	10.59	q
5	Anfernee Lopena	Philippines	10.65	
6	Salem Baghoot Abobakr	Yemen	10.93	
7	Sorsy Phompakdi	Laos	11.16	
			Wind: (−0.7 m/s)	

=== Heat 3 ===
Place	Athlete	Nation	Time	Notes
1	Ali Anwar Al-Balushi	Oman	10.06	Q, PB
2	Biwesa Daniel Kashama	South Korea	10.23	Q
3	Abdullah Abkar Mohammed	Saudi Arabia	10.32	Q, SB
4	Ali Haji	Bahrain	10.37	q
5	Chan Kin Wa	Macau	10.72	
6	Noureddine Hadid	Lebanon	10.74	
			Wind: (−0.5 m/s)	

=== Heat 4 ===
Place	Athlete	Nation	Time	Notes
1	Malham Al-Balushi	Oman	10.29	Q
2	Gurindervir Singh	India	10.38	Q
3	Hassan Taftian	Iran	10.46	Q
4	Cheung Ho Hin	Hong Kong	10.67	
5	Favoris Muzrapov	Tajikistan	10.69	
6	Lukman Gurbandurdyyev	Turkmenistan	10.80	
			Wind: (−0.2 m/s)	

=== Heat 5 ===
Place	Athlete	Nation	Time	Notes
1	Muhd Azeem Fahmi	Malaysia	10.17	Q
2	Marc Brian Louis	Singapore	10.33	Q, SB
3	Yang Chun-han	Chinese Taipei	10.38	Q
4	Imranur Rahman	Bangladesh	10.49	q
5	Leong Lok Io	Macau	10.65	
6	Hassan Saaid	Maldives	10.85	
			Wind: (−0.1 m/s)	

=== Heat 6 ===
Place	Athlete	Nation	Time	Notes
1	Xie Zhenye	China	10.30	Q
2	Rashid Abdulraouf	Bahrain	10.39	Q
3	Shuhei Tada	Japan	10.41	Q
4	Chutithat Pruksorranan	Thailand	10.48	q
5	Nasser Mahmoud Mohammed	Saudi Arabia	10.60	
6	Kent Francis Jardin	Philippines	10.74	
			Wind: (−0.9 m/s)	

== Semi-finals ==
The semi-finals took place on 25 September at 7.33pm. The two fastest athletes from each heat plus the next two fastest advanced to the semi-finals. Boonson set the fastest time – a new Games record of 9.91 s, 0.01 s faster than Su Bingtian's time at the 2018 Asian Games. Other medal contenders Ali Anwar Al-Balushi ran 10.01 s and Malham Al-Balushi ran 10.13 s.

=== Heat 1 ===
Place	Athlete	Nation	Time	Notes
1	Puripol Boonson	Thailand	9.91	Q, GR
2	Malham Al-Balushi	Oman	10.13	Q
3	Zeng Keli	China	10.24	q
4	Hassan Taftian	Iran	10.33	
5	Rashid Abdulraouf	Bahrain	10.34	PB
6	Abdullah Abkar Mohammed	Saudi Arabia	10.43	
7	Imranur Rahman	Bangladesh	10.44	
8	Sulton Gafurjonov	Uzbekistan	10.59	
			Wind: (+0.1 m/s)	

=== Heat 2 ===
Place	Athlete	Nation	Time	Notes
1	Ali Anwar Al-Balushi	Oman	10.01	Q
2	Xie Zhenye	China	10.18	Q
3	Daniel Biwesa	South Korea	10.22	q
4	Chen Wen-pu	Chinese Taipei	10.29	
5	Gurindervir Singh	India	10.32	
6	Shuhei Tada	Japan	10.37	
7	Muhammad Umaira	Malaysia	10.39	PB
8	Jo Kum-ryong	North Korea	10.54	
			Wind: (−0.3 m/s)	

=== Heat 3 ===
Place	Athlete	Nation	Time	Notes
1	Joeljin Nwamadi	South Korea	10.17	Q
2	Muhd Azeem Fahmi	Malaysia	10.25	Q
3	Yuki Koike	Japan	10.31	
4	Yang Chun-han	Chinese Taipei	10.33	
5	Ali Haji	Bahrain	10.36	
6	Marc Brian Louis	Singapore	10.37	
7	Animesh Kujur	India	10.38	
8	Chutithat Pruksorranan	Thailand	10.53	
			Wind: (+0.4 m/s)	

== Final ==
The final took place on 25 September at 10.20pm. Boonson ran a new Games record time of 9.90 s to win the gold medal. Ali Anwar Al-Balushi ran a personal best of 10.04 s to win the silver medal and Malham Al-Balushi ran a personal best of 10.11 to win the bronze medal.

Place	Athlete	Nation	Time	Notes
1st place, gold medalist(s)	Puripol Boonson	Thailand	9.90	GR, NR
2nd place, silver medalist(s)	Ali Anwar Al-Balushi	Oman	10.04	PB
3rd place, bronze medalist(s)	Malham Al-Balushi	Oman	10.11	PB
4	Joeljin Nwamadi	South Korea	10.17	
5	Daniel Biwesa	South Korea	10.19	
6	Zeng Keli	China	10.23	
7	Xie Zhenye	China	10.30	
8	Muhd Azeem Fahmi	Malaysia	14.65	
			Wind: (+0.1 m/s)	
