= Athletics at the 2026 Asian Games – Men's 4 × 100 metres relay =

Men's 4 × 100 metres relay at the 2026 Asian Games
- Venue: Nagoya City Mizuho Park Athletics Stadium
- Date: 27–28 September 2026
- Competitors: 56 from 13 nations

Medalists
gold medal	Chen Jinfeng; Zeng Keli; Wang Shengjie; Xie Zhenye	China
silver medal	Lai Po-hsiang; Chen Wen-pu; Huang Zuo-jyun; Yang Chun-han	Chinese Taipei
bronze medal	Seo Min-jun; Joeljin Nwamadi; Lee Jae-seong; Daniel Biwesa	South Korea

The men's 4 × 100 metres relay competition at the 2026 Asian Games took place on 27 and 28 September 2026 at the Nagoya City Mizuho Park Athletics Stadium in Nagoya, Japan.

China's Xie Zhenye, Zeng Keli, Wang Shengjie and Chen Jinfeng won the gold medal in 38.17 seconds, defending the title China had won at the 2022 Games. Chinese Taipei took silver in 38.32 seconds, while South Korea claimed the bronze in 38.43 seconds, a new national record.

== Schedule ==
All times are Japan Standard Time (UTC+09:00)

Schedule
Date	Time	Event
27 September 2026	22:12	Round 1 (Heat 1)
27 September 2026	22:22	Round 1 (Heat 2)
28 September 2026	22:23	Final

== Records ==
Prior to this competition, the existing world, Asian and Games records were as follows.

World Record	Jamaica	36.84	London, Great Britain	11 August 2012
Asian Record	Japan	37.43	Doha, Qatar	5 October 2019
Games Record	China	37.99	Incheon, South Korea	2 October 2014

== Results ==
=== Round 1 ===
First three in each heat (Q) and next two fastest (q) advanced to the final. The South Korean team, who were initially disqualified in the heats, were reinstated by the jury of appeal (qJ), making nine finalists.

==== Heat 1 ====
Place	Lane	Nation	Athletes	Time	Notes
1	5	China	Chen Jinfeng, Zeng Keli, Wang Shengjie, Shi Junhao	38.41	Q
2	3	Chinese Taipei	Lai Po-hsiang, Chen Wen-pu, Huang Tso-chun, Yang Chun-han	38.80	Q
3	2	Saudi Arabia	Mohammed Abdullah, Abdullah Mohammed, Abdulaziz Rabie Al-Jadani, Abdulaziz Abdui Atafi	39.09	Q, SB
4	6	Sri Lanka	Roshan Ranatungage, Chamod Yodhasinghe, Merone Wijesinghe, Dineth Weeraratna	39.43	q
5	8	Malaysia	Aidil Auf Hajam, Muhammad Haziq Akhir, Muhammad Umaira, Mohamad Armin Zahryl	39.99	
6	7	Bahrain	Ali Haji, Abbas Ali, Ebrahim Omar, Abdulraof Rashid	40.03	
7	4	Maldives	Ibrahim Naahil Nizaar, Riffath Adam, Saaid Hassan, Ibadulla Adam	41.76	

==== Heat 2 ====
Place	Lane	Nation	Athletes	Time	Notes
1	5	Japan	Shuhei Tada, Fukuto Komuro, Yoshihide Kiryu, Yuki Koike	38.71	Q
2	6	Thailand	Chutithat Pruksorranan, Puripol Boonson, Thawatchai Himaiad, Soraoat Dapbang	38.89	Q
3	2	Oman	Rashid Al-Aasmi, Malham Al-Balushi, Mohamed Al-Sadi, Ali Al-Balushi	38.99	Q, SB
4	3	South Korea	Kim Si-on, Joeljin Nwamadi, Lee Jae-seong, Daniel Biwesa	39.33	qJ
5	7	Singapore	Gan Yu An Ian, Ho Xander Ann, Lee Mark Ren, Tan Tate Fung	39.34	q, SB
6	4	Hong Kong	Chan Yat Lok, Kwok Chun Ting, Magnus Prostur Johannsson, Chung Tsz Sing	39.48	

=== Final ===
Place	Lane	Nation	Athletes	Time	Notes
1st place, gold medalist(s)	5	China	Chen Jinfeng, Zeng Keli, Wang Shengjie, Xie Zhenye	38.17	
2nd place, silver medalist(s)	7	Chinese Taipei	Lai Po-hsiang, Chen Wen-pu, Huang Tso-chun, Yang Chun-han	38.32	SB
3rd place, bronze medalist(s)	1	South Korea	Seo Min-jun, Joeljin Nwamadi, Lee Jae-seong, Daniel Biwesa	38.43	SB
4	8	Thailand	Natawat Iamudom, Soraoat Dapbang, Chayut Khongprasit, Puripol Boonson	38.49	
5	6	Japan	Shuhei Tada, Fukuto Komuro, Yoshihide Kiryu, Yuki Koike	38.57	
6	4	Oman	Rashid Al-Aasmi, Malham Al-Balushi, Mohamed Al-Sadi, Ali Al-Balushi	38.95	SB
7	3	Sri Lanka	Roshan Ranatungage, Chamod Yodhasinghe, Merone Wijesinghe, Dineth Weeraratna	39.55	
8	2	Singapore	Gan Yu An Ian, Ho Xander Ann, Lee Mark Ren, Tan Tate Fung	39.88	
—	9	Saudi Arabia	Mohammed Abdullah, Abdullah Mohammed, Abdulaziz Rabie Al-Jadani, Abdulaziz Abdui Atafi	DNF	
