= List of Thai records in athletics =

The following are the national records in athletics in Thailand maintained by Athletic Association of Thailand (AAT).

== Outdoor ==
Key to tables: Awaiting ratification Record not kept by AAT Not ratified or later rescinded by AAT

=== Men ===
Event	Record	Athlete	Date	Meet	Place	Ref.
60 m	6.59 (+0.8 m/s)	Puripol Boonson	1 August 2026	Velká cena Litomyšle letní mítink	Litomyšl, Czech Republic	
100 m	9.90 (+0.1 m/s)	Puripol Boonson	25 September 2026	Asian Games	Nagoya, Japan	
150 m	15.50 (−0.5 m/s)	Jirapong Meenapra	8 May 2016	26. Internationales Läufermeeting	Pliezhausen, Germany	
200 m	19.88 (−0.3 m/s)	Puripol Boonson	27 September 2026	Asian Games	Nagoya, Japan	
300 m	33.84	Kunanon Sukkaew	8 May 2016	26. Internationales Läufermeeting	Pliezhausen, Germany	
400 m	44.90	Joshua Atkinson	26 September 2026	Asian Games	Nagoya, Japan	
800 m	1:48.18	Joshua Atkinson	2 October 2023	Asian Games	Hangzhou, China	
1000 m	2:25.20	Yothin Yaprajan	10 August 2019	Zawody lekkoatletyczne klasy MM	Warszawa, Poland	
1500 m	3:36.16	Kieran Tuntivate	15 June 2024	Harry Jerome Track Classic	Burnaby, Canada	
Mile	3:54.72	Kieran Tuntivate	24 August 2024	The Monument Mile Classic	Stirling, United Kingdom	
3000 m	7:43.75	Kieran Tuntivate	16 August 2025	Meeting voor Mon	Leuven, Belgium	
5000 m	13:15.67 (Note: outdoor best; indoor mark ratified as absolute record)	Kieran Tuntivate	15 July 2023	KBC Night of Athletics	Heusden-Zolder, Belgium	
10,000 m	27:17.14	Kieran Tuntivate	20 February 2021	The Ten meet	San Juan Capistrano, United States	
10 km (road)	28:12	Kieran Tuntivate	1 August 2026	TD Beach to Beacon 10K Road Race	Cape Elizabeth, United States	
10 miles (road)	46:32	Kieran Tuntivate	12 April 2026	Cherry Blossom Ten Mile Run	Washington, D.C., United States	
15 km (road)	43:41+	Kieran Tuntivate	15 March 2026	United Airlines NYC Half	New York City, United States	
20 km (road)	58:03	Kieran Tuntivate	7 September 2026	USATF 20 km Championships	New Haven, United States	
Half marathon	1:02:39	Kieran Tuntivate	15 March 2026	United Airlines NYC Half	New York City, United States	
25 km (road)	1:15:20+	Kieran Tuntivate	11 October 2026	Chicago Marathon	Chicago, United States	
30 km (road)	1:30:23+	Kieran Tuntivate	11 October 2026	Chicago Marathon	Chicago, United States	
Marathon	2:08:01	Kieran Tuntivate	11 October 2026	Chicago Marathon	Chicago, United States	
110 m hurdles	13.61 (+0.4 m/s)	Jamras Rittidet	30 September 2014	Asian Games	Incheon, South Korea	
400 m hurdles	49.76	Chanond Keanchan	12 December 1995	Southeast Asian Games	Chiang Mai, Thailand	
2000 m steeplechase	6:03.85	Sornram Bangbunnak	30 May 2012		Phuket, Thailand	
3000 m steeplechase	8:52.47	Jirasak Sutthichart	8 December 2003	Southeast Asian Games	Hanoi, Vietnam	
High jump	2.27 m	Tawan Kaeodam	12 May 2023	Southeast Asian Games	Phnom Penh, Cambodia	
Pole vault	5.70 m	Patsapong Amsam-ang	16 December 2025	SEA Games	Bangkok, Thailand	
Long jump	8.05 m (+1.3 m/s)	Supanara Sukhasvasti	10 July 2011	Asian Championships	Kobe, Japan	
Triple jump	16.66 m (+2.0 m/s)	Nattaporn Namkanha	21 May 2002		Bangkok, Thailand	
Shot put	18.20 m	Chatchawal Polyemg	28 April 2009		Bangkok, Thailand	
Discus throw	55.71 m	Vansavang Savatdee	7 December 2003	Southeast Asian Games	Hanoi, Vietnam	
Hammer throw	68.00 m	Kittipong Boonmawan	13 December 2020		Bangkok, Thailand	
Javelin throw	76.98 m	Peerachet Jantra	3 September 2016	Mokpo International Throwing Meeting	Mokpo, South Korea	
Decathlon	7809 pts	Sutthisak Singkhon	25–26 August 2018	Asian Games	Jakarta, Indonesia	
Decathlon	100m (wind) / Long jump (wind) / Shot put / High jump / 400m / 110m H (wind) / Discus / Pole vault / Javelin / 1500m; 10.85 (+1.5 m/s) / 7.54 m (−0.2 m/s) / 13.71 m / 2.00 m / 48.49 / 14.88 (−0.8 m/s) / 44.42 m / 4.20 m / 57.07 m / 4:55.89					
10,000 m walk (track)	44:49.15					
10 km walk (road)	52:24		2011			
20,000 m walk (track)	1:36:46.07					
20 km walk (road)	1:29:40	Sakchai Samothkao	22 September 2003	Asian Championships	Manila, Philippines	
50 km walk (road)	4:32:40	Sakchai Samothkao	16 October 1997	Southeast Asian Games	Jakarta, Indonesia	
4 × 100 m relay	38.28	Thailand; Thawatchai Hiemiat; Puripol Boonson; Chayut Khongprasit; Soraoat Dapbang	15 December 2025	SEA Games	Bangkok, Thailand	
4 × 100 m relay	38.28	Thailand; Chutithat Pruksorranan; Puripol Boonson; Chayut Khongprasit; Soraoat Dapbang	21 June 2026	2nd Asian Relays Championships	Shaoxing, China	
4 × 200 m relay	1:22.66	Thailand; Reanchai Seeharwong; Vissanu Sophanich; Ekkachai Janthana; Sittichai Suwonprateep	29 April 2000	Penn Relays	Philadelphia, United States	
4 × 400 m relay	3:01.99	Thailand; Sarawut Nuansri; Khunaphat Kaijan; Adisak Pornsomphot; Joshua Atkinson	29 September 2026	Asian Games	Nagoya, Japan	

=== Women ===
Event	Record	Athlete	Date	Meet	Place	Ref.
100 m	11.33 (±0.0 m/s)	Supavadee Khawpeag	12 September 2001	Southeast Asian Games	Kuala Lumpur, Malaysia	
150 m	18.54 (−3.1 m/s)	Wanwisa Kongthong	8 May 2016	26. Internationales Läufermeeting	Pliezhausen, Germany	
200 m	23.30 (−0.7 m/s)	Supavadee Khawpeag	15 September 2001	Southeast Asian Games	Kuala Lumpur, Malaysia	
300 m	39.17	Orranut Klomdee	21 June 2002		Heidelberg, Germany	
400 m	52.60	Noodang Phimphoo	14 June 1993	Southeast Asian Games	Singapore	
800 m	2:03.46	Sasithorn Chantanuhong	26 September 1985	Asian Championships	Jakarta, Indonesia	
1500 m	4:22.58	Sasithorn Chantanuhong	10 December 1985	Southeast Asian Games	Bangkok, Thailand	
3000 m	10:04.41	Saifon Piawong	16 June 1996		Jakarta, Indonesia	
5000 m	17:09.59	Patcharee Chaitangsri	10 December 2003		Hanoi, Vietnam	
5 km (road)	17:24	Jane Vongvorachoti	4 March 2012		New York City, United States	
10,000 m	34:46.61	Jane Vongvorachoti	25 April 2013	Penn Relays	Philadelphia, United States	
10 km (road)	34:35	Jane Vongvorachoti	16 November 2013	Beautiful Bay 10K	Mastic Beach, United States	
15 km (road)	55:22+	Jane Vongvorachoti	17 March 2013	New York City Half Marathon	New York City, United States	
20 km (road)	1:13:38+	Jane Vongvorachoti	17 March 2013	New York City Half Marathon	New York City, United States	
Half marathon	1:15:24	Jane Vongvorachoti	19 January 2014	Houston Half Marathon	Houston, United States	
Marathon	2:40:40	Jane Vongvorachoti	12 October 2014	Chicago Marathon	Chicago, United States	
100 m hurdles	12.83 (+1.9 m/s)	Trecia Roberts	27 August 1999	World Championships	Seville, Spain	
100 m hurdles	12.73 A (+1.1 m/s) (Note: as US citizen)	Trecia Roberts	13 July 1998		Flagstaff, United States	
400 m hurdles	56.25	Reawadee Watanasin	14 October 1994	Asian Games	Hiroshima, Japan	
3000 m steeplechase	11:15.94	Sonthiya Saiwaew	7 March 2012		Khon Kaen, Thailand	
High jump	1.94 m	Noengrothai Chaipetch	14 December 2009	Southeast Asian Games	Vientiane, Laos	
Pole vault	4.30 m	Sukanya Chomchuendee	28 August 2018	Asian Games	Jakarta, Indonesia	
Long jump	6.41 m (+0.7 m/s)	Parinya Chuaimaroeng	4 May 2018	Thai Open Championships	Bangkok, Thailand	
Triple jump	14.17 m (+1.0 m/s)	Parinya Chuaimaroeng	25 May 2018	Taiwan Open	Taipei City, Republic of China	
Shot put	18.24 m	Juttaporn Krasaeyan	15 December 1998	Asian Games	Bangkok, Thailand	
Discus throw	61.97 m	Subenrat Insaeng	19 July 2018		Kolín, Czech Republic	
Hammer throw	62.49 m	Mingkamon Koomphon	19 July 2018		Kolín, Czech Republic	
Javelin throw	61.40 m	Buoban Phamang	14 August 2007	Universiade	Bangkok, Thailand	
Heptathlon	5889 pts	Vassana Vinatho	10–11 December 2007	Southeast Asian Games	Nakhon Ratchasima, Thailand	
Heptathlon	100m H (wind) / High jump / Shot put / 200m (wind) / Long jump (wind) / Javelin / 800m; 13.97 / 1.79 m / 11.82 m / 24.74 / 6.30 m / 34.90 m / 2:16.85					
5 km walk (road)	25:46+	Thanaporn Assawawongcharoen	20 March 2016	Asian Race Walking Championships	Nomi, Japan	
10,000 m walk (track)	53:17.10	Tanaphon Assawawongcharoen	23 August 2017	Southeast Asian Games	Bukit Jalil, Malaysia	
10 km walk (road)	52:00+	Thanaporn Assawawongcharoen	20 March 2016	Asian Race Walking Championships	Nomi, Japan	
15 km walk (road)	1:18:57+	Thanaporn Assawawongcharoen	20 March 2016	Asian Race Walking Championships	Nomi, Japan	
20,000 m walk (track)	2:01.04	Thanaporn Piamsakul	26 April 2011	Thailand Open Championships	Bangkok, Thailand	
20 km walk (road)	1:44:46	Tanaphon Assawawongcharoen	15 December 2013	Southeast Asian Games	Naypyidaw, Myanmar	
4 × 100 m relay	43.38	Thailand; Sangwan Jaksunin; Nongnuch Sanrat; Orranut Klomdee; Jutamass Thavoncharoen	26 June 2008		Nakhon Ratchasima, Thailand	
4 × 400 m relay	3:33.16	Thailand; Pornpan Hoemhuk; Atchima Eng-Chuan; Karat Srimuang; Treewadee Yongphan	2 October 2014	Asian Games	Incheon, South Korea	

=== Mixed ===
Event	Record	Athlete	Date	Meet	Place	Ref.
4 × 100 m relay	40.87	Thailand; Natawat Iamudom; Supanich Poolkerd; Puripol Boonson; Jirapat Khanonta	29 September 2026	Asian Games	Nagoya, Japan	
4 × 400 m relay	3:16.56	Thailand; Sarawut Nuansi; Benny Nontanam; Joshua Atkinson; Chinenye Josephine Onuorah	13 December 2025	Southeast Asian Games	Bangkok, Thailand	

== Indoor ==
=== Men ===
Event	Record	Athlete	Date	Meet	Place	Ref.
60 m	6.65	Wachara Sondee	10 February 2006	Asian Championships	Pattaya, Thailand	
60 m	6.65	Wachara Sondee	30 October 2007	Asian Indoor Games	Macau	
200 m	21.82	Sompote Suwannarangsri	1 March 2005		Tianjin, China	
400 m	47.40	Jukkatip Phocharoen	31 October 2007	Asian Indoor Games	Macau	
800 m	1:56.40	Jakkrit Pattasai	1 November 2009	Asian Indoor Games	Hanoi, Vietnam	
1000 m	2:28.14	Kieran Tuntivate	13 February 2016	Boston BU David Hemery Valentine Invitational	Boston, United States	
1500 m	3:39.69 +	Kieran Tuntivate	14 February 2025	BU David Hemery Valentine Invitational	Boston, United States	
Mile	3:54.72	Kieran Tuntivate	14 February 2025	BU David Hemery Valentine Invitational	Boston, United States	
3000 m	7:49.15	Kieran Tuntivate	1 February 2020		Boston, United States	
5000 m	13:08.41	Kieran Tuntivate	12 February 2022	BU David Hemery Valentine Invitational	Boston, United States	
60 m hurdles	7.78	Jamras Rittidet	1 November 2009	Asian Indoor Games	Hanoi, Vietnam	
High jump	2.15 m	Torlaph Sudjinta	13 November 2005	Asian Indoor Games	Pattaya, Thailand	
Pole vault	5.31 m	Patsapong Amsam-Ang	11 February 2018		Szczecin, Poland	
Pole vault	5.35 m	Patsapong Amsam-ang	12 February 2023	Asian Championships	Astana, Kazakhstan	
Pole vault	5.45 m	Patsapong Amsam-ang	18 February 2024	Asian Championships	Tehran, Iran	
Long jump	7.71 m	Theerayut Philakong	1 November 2009	Asian Indoor Games	Hanoi, Vietnam	
Triple jump	16.12 m	Pratchaya Tepparak	20 September 2017	Asian Indoor and Martial Arts Games	Ashgabat, Turkmenistan	
Shot put	17.49 m	Sarayudh Pinitjit	12 February 2006	Asian Championships	Pattaya, Thailand	
Heptathlon	5332 pts	Sutthisak Singkhon	20 September 2017	Asian Indoor and Martial Arts Games	Ashgabat, Turkmenistan	
Heptathlon	60m / Long jump / Shot put / High jump / 60m H / Pole vault / 1000m; 7.05 / 7.32 m / 14.00 m / 1.91 m / 8.49 / 4.20 m / 3:07.82					
5000 m walk						
4 × 400 m relay	3:11.07	Thailand; Chanatip Ruckburee; Jukkatip Pojaroen; Suphachai Phachsay; Suppachai Chimdee	2 November 2009	Asian Indoor Games	Hanoi, Vietnam	

=== Women ===
Event	Record	Athlete	Date	Meet	Place	Ref.
60 m	7.28	Nongnuch Sanrat	30 October 2007	Asian Indoor Games	Macau	
200 m	24.47	Juthama Thavoncharoen	1 March 2005		Tianjin, China	
400 m	54.45	Atchima Eng-Chuan	19 September 2017	Asian Indoor and Martial Arts Games	Ashgabat, Turkmenistan	
800 m	2:12.17	Buatip Boonprasert	14 November 2005	Asian Indoor Games	Pattaya, Thailand	
1500 m	4:51.42	Woraphan Nuanlsri	19 September 2017	Asian Indoor and Martial Arts Games	Ashgabat, Turkmenistan	
3000 m	9:46.55 (Note: outdoor mark ratified as absolute record)	Jane Vongvorachoti	15 February 2013		New York City, United States	
60 m hurdles	8.09 A	Trecia Roberts	19 February 2000		Colorado Springs, United States	
High jump	1.93 m	Noengrothai Chaipetch	2 November 2009	Asian Indoor Games	Hanoi, Vietnam	
Pole vault	3.86 m	Sukanya Chomchuendee	26 March 2014		Caotun, Taiwan	
Long jump	6.18 m (2nd jump)	Thitima Muangjan	2 November 2009	Asian Indoor Games	Hanoi, Vietnam	
Long jump	6.18 m (4th jump)	Thitima Muangjan	2 November 2009	Asian Indoor Games	Hanoi, Vietnam	
Triple jump	13.78 m	Thitima Muangjan	1 November 2009	Asian Indoor Games	Hanoi, Vietnam	
Shot put	16.17 m	Juthaporn Krasaeyan	1 March 2005		Tianjin, China	
Pentathlon	4184 pts	Vassanee Vinatho	14 February 2008	Asian Championships	Doha, Qatar	
Pentathlon	60m H / High jump / Shot put / Long jump / 800m; 8.2h / 1.76 m / 10.72 m / 6.05 m / 2:22.96					
3000 m walk						
4 × 400 m relay	3:38.25	Thailand; Jutamass Tawoncharoen; Saowalee Kaewchuay; Kanya Harnthong; Wassana Winatho	1 November 2007	Asian Indoor Games	Macau	
