= List of South Korean records in athletics =

The following are the national records in athletics in South Korea maintained by the Korean Association of Athletics Federations (KAAF).

== Outdoor ==
Key to tables: Awaiting ratification Record not kept by KAAF

=== Men ===
Event	Record	Athlete	Date	Meet	Place	Ref.
100 m	10.07 (+0.8 m/s)	Kim Kuk-young	27 June 2017	Korea Open	Jeongseon-eup, South Korea	
200 m	20.40 (+0.3 m/s)	Park Tae-geon	28 June 2018	South Korean Championships	Jeongseon-eup, South Korea	
300 m	33.01	Mo Il-hwan	22 April 2018	Izumo Meet	Izumo, Japan	
400 m	45.37	Shon Ju-il	17 June 1994		Seoul, South Korea	
800 m	1:44.14	Lee Jin-il	17 June 1994	South Korean Championships	Seoul, South Korea	
1500 m	3:36.01	Lee Jae-ung	16 July 2025	Hokuren Distance Challenge	Kitami, Japan	
3000 m	8:12.59	Jeon Eun-hoi	29 June 2005		Fukugawa, Japan	
5000 m	13:42.98	Baek Seung-ho	17 July 2010	HDC's Abashiri Meet	Abashiri, Japan	
10,000 m	28:23.62	Jeon Eun-hoi	23 October 2010		Yokohama, Japan	
10 km (road)	29:27	Jeon Eun-hoi	7 May 2005		Gwacheon, South Korea	
Half marathon	1:01:04 dh	Lee Bong-ju	26 January 1992		Tokyo, Japan	
30 km (road)	1:31:48	Kim Chul-un	21 February 1988		Ōme, Japan	
Marathon	2:07:20	Lee Bong-ju	13 February 2000	Tokyo International Marathon	Tokyo, Japan	
110 m hurdles	13.39 (+0.3 m/s)	Kim Byung-jun	12 June 2017	Thailand Open	Bangkok, Thailand	
400 m hurdles	49.80	Hwang Hong-chul	10 June 1990		Seoul, South Korea	
2000 m steeplechase	5:54.22	Choi Jae-kyung	4 July 2018	Hokuren Distance Challenge	Abashiri, Japan	
3000 m steeplechase	8:42.86	Jin Soo-sun	10 June 1990		Seoul, South Korea	
High jump	2.35 m (Note: indoor mark ratified as absolute record)	Woo Sang-hyeok	1 August 2021	Olympic Games	Tokyo, Japan	
High jump	2.35 m	Woo Sang-hyeok	18 July 2022	World Championships	Eugene, United States	
High jump	2.35 m	Woo Sang-hyeok	16 September 2023	Prefontaine Classic	Eugene, United States	
Pole vault	5.80 m	Jin Min-sub	1 March 2020 (Note: by World Athletics source; 2 March 2020 by federation source)		Sydney, Australia	
Long jump	8.22 m (+0.4 m/s)	Kim Deok-hyeon	10 June 2016	Messe Ried Meeting	Ried im Innkreis, Austria	
Triple jump	17.10 m (+1.3 m/s)	Kim Deok-hyeon	5 June 2009		Daegu, South Korea	
Shot put	19.49 m	Jung Il-woo	12 July 2015	China–Japan–Korea Friendship Meeting	Sapporo, Japan	
Discus throw	59.68 m	Choi Jong-bum	8 June 2013		Yeosu, South Korea	
Hammer throw	73.77 m	Lee Yun-chul	8 July 2017	Asian Championships	Bhubaneswar, India	
Javelin throw	83.99 m	Park Jae-myong	13 March 2004		Wellington, New Zealand	
Decathlon	7860 pts	Kim Kun-woo	27–28 August 2011	World Championships	Daegu, South Korea	
Decathlon	100m (wind) / Long jump (wind) / Shot put / High jump / 400m / 110m H (wind) / Discus / Pole vault / Javelin / 1500m; 11.11 (−0.2 m/s) / 7.24 m (+0.2 m/s) / 12.96 m / 1.96 m / 49.24 / 14.95 (−0.1 m/s) / 39.53 m / 4.90 m / 53.33 m / 4:15.63					
5000 m walk (track)	20:28.70	Lee Dae-ro	18 April 2001		Sokcho, South Korea	
5 km walk (road)	19:41+	Kim Hyun-sub	15 March 2015	Asian Race Walking Championships	Nomi, Japan	
10,000 m walk (track)	39:11.65	Choe Byeong-kwang	21 April 2021	South Korean Club Championships	Yecheon, South Korea	
10 km walk (road)	38:13	Kim Hyun-sub	18 September 2010	IAAF Race Walking Challenge Final	Beijing, China	
15 km walk (road)	59:20+	Kim Hyun-sub	15 March 2015	Asian Race Walking Championships	Nomi, Japan	
20 km walk (road)	1:19:13	Kim Hyun-sub	15 March 2015	Asian Race Walking Championships	Nomi, Japan	
30 km walk (road)	2:06:32	Joo Hyun-myeong	12 May 2026	Korean Championships	Jeongseon, South Korea	
35 km walk (road)	2:33:42	Choe Byeong-kwang	16 March 2025	Asian Race Walking Championships	Nomi, Japan	
50 km walk (road)	3:45:55	Park Chil-sung	11 August 2012	Olympic Games	London, United Kingdom	
4 × 100 m relay	38.49	South Korea; Seo Min-jun; Nwamadi Joel-jin; Lee Jae-seong; Lee Jun-hyeok	31 May 2025	Asian Championships	Gumi, South Korea	
4 × 400 m relay	3:04.03	South Korea; Park Se-jung; Park Bong-go; Seong Hyeo-kje; Yeo Ho-suah	2 October 2014	Asian Games	Incheon, South Korea	

=== Women ===
Event	Record	Athlete	Date	Meet	Place	Ref.
100 m	11.49 (+0.8 m/s)	Lee Young-sook	17 June 1994		Seoul, South Korea	
100 m	11.49 (±0.0 m/s)	Lee Young-sook	15 September 1994		Fukuoka, Japan	
200 m	23.69 (−0.1 m/s)	Kim Ha-na	21 October 2009		Daejeon, South Korea	
400 m	53.67	Lee Yun-kyung	12 August 2003		Taebaek, South Korea	
600 m	1:29.34	Huh Yeon-jung	9 July 2008	Hokuren Distance Challenge	Abashiri, Japan	
800 m	2:04.12	Huh Yeon-jung	19 September 2010		Kawasaki, Japan	
1500 m	4:14.18	Lee Mi-gyeong	20 September 1992	World Junior Championships	Seoul, South Korea	
3000 m	9:00.30	Jung Young-im	20 September 1992	World Junior Championships	Seoul, South Korea	
5000 m	15:34.17	Kim Do-yeon	13 July 2017		Abashiri, Japan	
10,000 m	32:33.61	Ahn Seul-ki	11 July 2018		Fukagawa, Japan	
10 km (road)	33:31	Park Ho-sun	15 September 2013		Seoul, South Korea	
20 km (road)	1:08:59	Lee Mi-ok	6 December 1987		Okayama, Japan	
Half marathon	1:08:35	Choi Kyung-sun	2 February 2020	Kagawa Marugame Half Marathon	Marugame, Japan	
30 km (road)	1:50:47	Park Ho-sun	4 February 2007		Ome, Japan	
Marathon	2:25:41	Kim Do-yeon	18 March 2018	Seoul International Marathon	Seoul, South Korea	
100 m hurdles	13.00 (+0.8 m/s)	Lee Yeon-kyung	7 June 2010		Daegu, South Korea	
400 m hurdles	57.34	Jo Eun-ju	3 May 2013		Ansan, South Korea	
3000 m steeplechase	10:01.99	Cho Ha-rim	20 July 2024	Hokuren Distance Challenge	Chitose, Japan	
High jump	1.93 m	Kim Hui-seon	10 June 1990		Seoul, South Korea	
Pole vault	4.41 m	Choi Yun-hee	8 May 2012		Gimcheon, South Korea	
Long jump	6.76 m (−0.2 m/s)	Jung Soon-ok	4 June 2009		Daegu, South Korea	
Triple jump	13.92 m (+1.6 m/s)	Kim Su-yeon	26 May 2006		Gongju, South Korea	
Shot put	19.36 m	Lee Myung-sun	19 April 2000		Shanghai, China	
Discus throw	57.70 m	Sin Yu-jin	15 June 2024	National Division Championships	Mokpo, South Korea	
Hammer throw	64.14 m	Kim Tae-hui	29 September 2023	Asian Games	Hangzhou, China	
Javelin throw	60.92 m	Chang Jung-yeon	22 April 2004		Jecheon, South Korea	
Heptathlon	5535 pts	Jeong Yeon-jin	26–27 July 2020		Yecheon, South Korea	
Heptathlon	100m H (wind) / High jump / Shot put / 200m (wind) / Long jump (wind) / Javelin / 800m; 13.86 (+0.3 m/s) / 1.77 m / 10.95 m / 26.07 (+0.7 m/s) / 6.01 m (+0.7 m/s) / 37.45 m / 2:26.12					
10,000 m walk (track)	44:32.22	Jeon Yeong-eun	20 June 2012	KBS Cup	Changwon, South Korea	
10 km walk (road)	44:56+	Jeon Yeong-eun	15 March 2015	Asian Race Walking Championships	Nomi, Japan	
15 km walk (road)	1:07:41+	Jeon Yeong-eun	15 March 2015	Asian Race Walking Championships	Nomi, Japan	
20 km walk (road)	1:29:38	Kim Mi-jung	13 October 2008		Yeosu, South Korea	
50 km walk (road)						
4 × 100 m relay	44.45	South Korea; Eun-bin Lee; Da-seul Kang; So-eun Kim; Kim Dae-un	31 May 2025	Asian Championships	Gumi, South Korea	
4 × 400 m relay	3:39.90	South Korea; Min Ji-hyun; Oh Se-ra; Park Mi-jin; Jo Eun-ju	2 October 2014	Asian Games	Incheon, South Korea	

=== Mixed ===
Event	Record	Athlete	Date	Meet	Place	Ref.
4 × 400 m relay	3:22.87	South Korea; Shin Min-kyu; Kim Seo-yoon; Joo Seung-kyun; Kim Ju-ha	28 May 2025	Asian Championships	Gumi, South Korea	
4 × 400 m relay	3:18.66	South Korea; Minho Jang; Seoyoon Kim; Minkyu Shin; Ayoung Lee	24 September 2026	Asian Games	Nagoya, Japan	

== Indoor ==
=== Men ===
Event	Record	Athlete	Date	Meet	Place	Ref.
60 m	6.74	Cho Kyu-Won	5 December 2009		Montreal, Canada	
200 m						
400 m	46.88	Shon Ju-il	27 February 1996		Tianjin, China	
800 m	1:49.08	Lee Jin-il	14 February 1993		Maebashi, Japan	
1500 m	3:47.95	Kim Bong-Yu	1991			
3000 m	8:21.37	Shin Hyun-Su	1 November 2009	Asian Indoor Games	Hanoi, Vietnam	
60 m hurdles	7.77	Lee Jung-joon	18 September 2017	Asian Indoor and Martial Arts Games	Ashgabat, Turkmenistan	
High jump	2.36 m	Woo Sang-hyeok	5 February 2022	Hustopečské skákání	Hustopeče, Czech Republic	
Pole vault	5.61 m	Kim Yoo-Suk	26 February 2005		Seattle, United States	
Long jump	7.84 m	Kim Jong-Il	15 January 1985		Osaka, Japan	
Triple jump	15.99 m	Kim Deok-Hyeon	11 March 2006	World Championships	Moscow, Russia	
Shot put	19.24 m	Jung Il-woo	18 September 2017	Asian Indoor and Martial Arts Games	Ashgabat, Turkmenistan	
Heptathlon						
Heptathlon	60m / Long jump / Shot put / High jump / 60m H / Pole vault / 1000m					
5000 m walk						,
4 × 400 m relay						

=== Women ===
Event	Record	Athlete	Date	Meet	Place	Ref.
60 m	7.63	Kim Min-ji	26 February 2015		Daegu, South Korea	
200 m	25.95	Kim Nam-Mi	18 February 2004		Tianjin, China	
400 m	56.11	Lee Yun-Kyong	18 February 2004		Tianjin, China	
800 m	2:11.18	Oh Mi-Ja	11 February 1993		Osaka, Japan	
1500 m	4:40.25	Youm Ko-Eun	31 October 2009	Asian Indoor Games	Hanoi, Vietnam	
3000 m	9:40.22	Kim Sung-eun	13 November 2005	Asian Indoor Games	Pattaya, Thailand	
60 m hurdles	8.32 A	Jung Hye-lim	21 February 2014	NAU Last Chance	Flagstaff, United States	
High jump	1.91 m	Kim Hee-sun	11 February 1988		Osaka, Japan	
Pole vault	4.30 m	Choi Yun-hee	19 February 2012	Asian Championships	Hangzhou, China	
Long jump	5.92 m A	Jung Soon-ok	30 January 2016		Flagstaff, United States	
Triple jump	12.70 m	Chung Hye-Kyong	18 February 2004		Tianjin, China	
Shot put	17.56 m	Lee Myung-sun	7 March 1998		Maebashi, Japan	
Pentathlon						
Pentathlon	60m H / High jump / Shot put / Long jump / 800m					
3000 m walk						
4 × 400 m relay						
