= Athletics at the 2026 Asian Games – Men's 200 metres =

Men's 200 metres at the 2026 Asian Games
- Venue: Mizuho Park Athletic Stadium, Nagoya
- Date: 26–27 September 2026
- Competitors: 36 from 26 nations
- Winning time: 19.88

Medalists
gold medal	Puripol Boonson	Thailand
silver medal	Huang Youwen	China
bronze medal	Soshi Mizukubo	Japan

The men's 200 metres competition at the 2026 Asian Games took place on 26 and 27 September 2026 at the Nagoya City Mizuho Park Athletic Stadium in Nagoya, Japan. In total, 33 athletes from 24 countries took part in the event.

Puripol Boonson of Thailand won the gold medal in an Asian record time of 19.98 s. Huang Youwen of China and Soshi Mizukubo of Japan won the silver and bronze medals, respectively.

== Background ==
The atletics events were held at the Nagoya City Mizuho Park Athletic Stadium in Nagoya, Japan from 23 to 29 September 2026.

Koki Ueyama of Japan was the defending champion after winning the gold medal at the 2022 Asian Games in Hangzhou.

== Round 1 ==
The heats took place on 26 September at 11.30am. The four fastest athletes from each heat plus the next four fastest advanced to the semi-finals. Soshi Mizukubo set the fastest time (20.72 s) in the first round and was one of five athletes to run sub-21 s. Other medal contenders Ke Wu-yen-ming ran 20.84 s and Huang Youwen ran 20.90 s.

=== Heat 1 ===
Place	Athlete	Nation	Time	Notes
1	Puripol Boonson	Thailand	20.97	Q
2	Ali Haji	Bahrain	21.12	Q, PB
3	Yip King Wai	Hong Kong	21.13	Q
4	Lok Io Leong	Macau	21.91	Q
5	Ibrahim Naahil Nizaar	Maldives	22.62	
6	Mouzinho Belo	Timor-Leste	23.66	
—	Malham Al-Balushi	Oman	DQ	
			Wind: (+0.3 m/s)	

=== Heat 2 ===
Place	Athlete	Nation	Time	Notes
1	Soshi Mizukubo	Japan	20.72	Q
2	Ke Wu-yen-ming	Chinese Taipei	20.84	Q, PB
3	Abdullah Mohammed	Saudi Arabia	20.97	Q
4	Abdul Quddus Ali	United Arab Emirates	21.07	Q
5	Benyamin Yousefi	Iran	21.21	q
6	Noureddine Hadid	Lebanon	21.53	q
7	Zu Iz Mohamed Suad	Maldives	22.70	PB
			Wind: (−0.3 m/s)	

=== Heat 3 ===
Place	Athlete	Nation	Time	Notes
1	Huang Youwen	China	20.90	Q
2	Danish Muhammad	Malaysia	21.04	Q, SB
3	Abdulaziz Atafi	Saudi Arabia	21.15	Q
4	Lee Jae-seong	South Korea	21.42	Q
5	Lukman Gurbandurdyyev	Turkmenistan	22.11	
6	Abobakr Baghoot	Yemen	22.32	PB
			Wind: (−0.4 m/s)	

=== Heat 4 ===
Place	Athlete	Nation	Time	Notes
1	Abbas Ali	Bahrain	21.13	Q
2	Akira Hayashi	Japan	21.19	Q
3	Shajar Abbas	Pakistan	21.23	Q
4	Neil Catral	Philippines	21.49	Q
5	Sulton Gafurjonov	Uzbekistan	21.88	q
6	Sorsy Phomphakdi	Laos	22.89	
—	Nwamadi Joel-jin	South Korea	DNF	
			Wind: (−0.6 m/s)	

=== Heat 5 ===
Place	Athlete	Nation	Time	Notes
1	Animesh Kujur	India	21.10	Q
2	Thawatchai Himaiad	Thailand	21.19	Q
3	Magnus Johannsson	Hong Kong	21.19	Q
4	Ali Al-Balushi	Oman	21.41	Q
5	Muhammad Mohamad	Malaysia	21.44	q
6	Favoris Muzrapov	Tajikistan	22.28	
			Wind: (+0.4 m/s)	

== Semi-finals ==
The semi-finals took place on 26 September at 8.24pm. The two fastest athletes from each heat plus the next two fastest advanced to the semi-finals. Puripol Boonson set the fastest time – a new Games record of 20.10 s. Other medal contenders Mizukubo ran 20.37 s and Youwen ran 20.42 s.

=== Heat 1 ===
Place	Athlete	Nation	Time	Notes
1	Soshi Mizukubo	Japan	20.37	Q
2	Ke Wu-yen-ming	Chinese Taipei	20.71	Q
3	Yip King Wai	Hong Kong	20.74	q
4	Danish Muhammad	Malaysia	20.76	q, SB
5	Abdulaziz Atafi	Saudi Arabia	20.88	
6	Neil Catral	Philippines	21.33	
7	Sulton Gafurjonov	Uzbekistan	21.72	
–	Lee Jae-seong	South Korea	DNF	
			Wind: (+0.4 m/s)	

=== Heat 2 ===
Place	Athlete	Nation	Time	Notes
1	Huang Youwen	China	20.42	Q
2	Ali Al-Balushi	Oman	20.78	Q
3	Thawatchai Himaiad	Thailand	20.97	
4	Abbas Ali	Bahrain	21.01	
5	Magnus Johannsson	Hong Kong	21.18	
6	Noureddine Hadid	Lebanon	21.48	
7	Lok Io Leong	Macau	21.76	
–	Abdullah Mohammed	Saudi Arabia	DNS	
			Wind: (−0.1 m/s)	

=== Heat 3 ===
Place	Athlete	Nation	Time	Notes
1	Puripol Boonson	Thailand	20.10	Q, GR
2	Animesh Kujur	India	20.81	Q
3	Ali Haji	Bahrain	20.91	PB
4	Akira Hayashi	Japan	20.93	
5	Abdul Quddus Ali	United Arab Emirates	21.05	
6	Benyamin Yousefi	Iran	21.20	
7	Shajar Abbas	Pakistan	21.30	
8	Muhammad Mohamad	Malaysia	21.50	
			Wind: (±0.0 m/s)	

== Final ==
The final took place on 27 September at 7.35pm. Boonson ran a new Asian record time of 19.88 s to win the gold medal. Youwen ran a personal best of 20.45 s to win the silver medal and Mizukubo ran a personal best of 20.56 to win the bronze medal.

Place	Athlete	Nation	Time	Notes
1st place, gold medalist(s)	Puripol Boonson	Thailand	19.88	AR
2nd place, silver medalist(s)	Huang Youwen	China	20.45	PB
3rd place, bronze medalist(s)	Soshi Mizukubo	Japan	20.56	PB
4	Ali Al-Balushi	Oman	20.72	
5	Animesh Kujur	India	20.80	
6	Danish Muhammad	Malaysia	20.89	
7	Ke Wu-yen-ming	Chinese Taipei	21.02	
8	Yip King Wai	Hong Kong	21.22	
			Wind: (−0.3 m/s)	
