= Puripol Boonson =

Thai sprinter (born 2006)

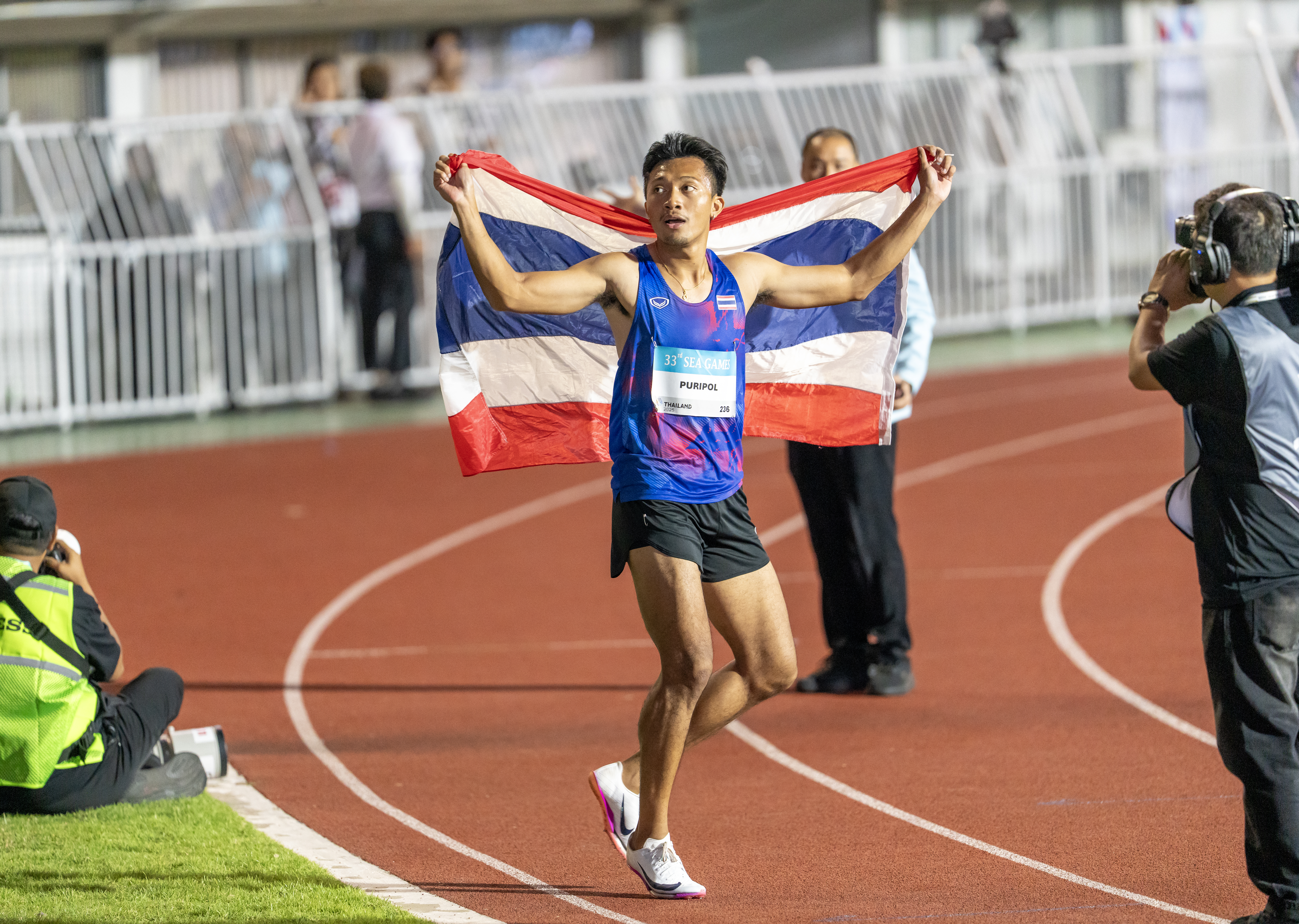
- Puripol at the 2025 SEA Games

Personal information
- Nickname: Bew
- Born: 13 January 2006 (age 20) Surin, Thailand
- Height: 1.82 m (6 ft 0 in)

Sport
- Sport: Athletics
- Events: 100 m, 200 m

Achievements and titles
- Personal bests: 100 m: 9.90 NR (Nagoya 2026); 200 m: 19.88 =AR NR (Nagoya 2026)
Medal record
Men's athletics
Representing Thailand
Asian Games
Gold medal – first place	2026 Aichi–Nagoya	100 m
Gold medal – first place	2026 Aichi–Nagoya	200 m
Silver medal – second place	2026 Aichi–Nagoya	Mixed 4 × 100 m relay
Silver medal – second place	2022 Hangzhou	100 m
Asian Beach Games
Gold medal – first place	2026 Sanya	60 m
Silver medal – second place	2026 Sanya	4 × 60 m
Asian Championships
Gold medal – first place	2023 Bangkok	4 × 100 m
Silver medal – second place	2025 Gumi	100 m
Silver medal – second place	2025 Gumi	4 × 100 m
SEA Games
Gold medal – first place	2021 Hanoi	100 m
Gold medal – first place	2021 Hanoi	200 m
Gold medal – first place	2021 Hanoi	4 × 100 m
Gold medal – first place	2025 Bangkok	100 m
Gold medal – first place	2025 Bangkok	200 m
Gold medal – first place	2025 Bangkok	4 × 100 m
World University Games
Silver medal – second place	2025 Rhine-Ruhr	100 m
World U20 Championships
Silver medal – second place	2024 Lima	100 m
Bronze medal – third place	2024 Lima	4 × 100 m
Asian U18 Championships
Gold medal – first place	2022 Kuwait	100 m
Gold medal – first place	2022 Kuwait	200 m
Silver medal – second place	2022 Kuwait	Medley

Puripol Boonson (Thai: ภูริพล บุญสอน; RTGS: Phuriphon Bunson; pronounced [pʰūː.rí(ʔ).pʰōn būn.sɔ̌ːn]; born 13 January 2006) is a Thai sprinter who specialises in the 100 and 200 metres. He is the Asian record co-holder in the 200 metres, with a time of 19.88 seconds set in 2026 and the first Southeast Asian sprinter to break the 10-second barrier with a SEA Games record of 9.94 seconds set in 2025 on home soil. At the 2026 Asian Games, he won gold medals in the 100 and 200 metres, setting Asian Games records in both events, and was named the men's Most Valuable Player.

== Career ==
=== 2022 ===
Puripol's first exploits came during the 2021 Southeast Asian Games in Hanoi, Vietnam where he clinched golds in the 100 m, 200 m, and 4 × 100 m relay events.

On 3 June 2022, he established in Yecheon the National record of 4 × 100 m in 38.56 s with Chayut Khongprasit, Siripol Punpa and Soraoat Dapbang.

With a national record of 20.19 seconds (+1.7 m/s) in Almaty (KAZ) on 26 June 2022, he realised the AU20R and AU18R. Becoming the third-best youth performance ever, trailing only Erriyon Knighton and Usain Bolt.

This stellar performance earned him a ticket to the 2022 World Athletics Championships, but the Thai Athletics Federation opted to save him for the 2022 World Athletics U20 Championships.

On 2 August 2022, he broke the under-18 World's Best Performance of the 100-metre with 10.09 seconds (+0.7 m/s) at the semi-finals of the 2022 World Athletics U20 championships in Cali (Christian Miller of the U.S. recently edged out this record in July 2023, finishing in 10.06 seconds). He finished fourth in the finals with 10.12 seconds (+0.8 m/s).

=== 2023 ===
In the unfortunate turn of events at the 2023 Southeast Asian Games, Boonson suffered a hamstring injury during the 200 metres final. This setback forced him to withdraw from the competition, subsequently sidelining him from the 2023 Asian U20 Athletics Championships.

Returning to the track gradually after his injury, in July 2023, at the 2023 Asian Athletics Championships in Bangkok, Boonson competed in the 4 × 100 m relay event, winning the gold medal with a time of 38.55 seconds. This outstanding performance not only set a new national record, but also a new championship record.

On 30 September 2023, he competed in the 2022 Asian Games in Hangzhou, during the 100 m semi-final, he matched the under-18 World Best Performances he had lost earlier in the year, clocking in at 10.06 seconds. In the final, he achieved the silver with a time of 10.02 seconds, although the wind was too favourable for his record to be officially recognised.

Concerned about a recurrence of his injury, Boonson, despite qualifying for the 200 m semi-finals, only covered a few metres before withdrawing from the race. He chose to conserve himself for the 4 × 100 m relay.

In the relay final, he finished in 4th place with a time of 38.81 seconds, just seven hundredths of a second shy of the bronze medal claimed by South Korea.

=== 2024 ===
On 4 May, he competed with his team in the 4 × 100 m relay event at the World Relays in Nassau, hoping to qualify for the 2024 Olympic Games, but they fail to do so, funding 5th in the second qualifying round.

On 15 June, at the Thai Athletics Championships, he took first place in the 100 m with a time of 10.17 seconds.

With his many races in the United States, Boonson qualifies for the 2024 Summer Olympics in Paris for the 100 metres, being ranked 47th in the World Ranking.

He was named flag bearer for the Thai delegation at the 2024 Summer Olympics, alongside 12-year-old skateboarder Vareeraya Sukasem.

At the Paris Olympics, he achieved automatic qualification in the heats by finishing 3rd in 10.13 seconds, behind Jamaican Oblique Seville and Japan's Abdul Hakim Sani Brown. He failed to reach the final, finishing last in his semi-final in 10.14 seconds.

At the World Athletics U20 Championships in Lima, he wins the 100 m silver medal in 10.22 seconds (−0.9 m/s).

With this achievement, he becomes the first Thai athlete to win a medal in this category.

In the final of the 4 × 100 m relay, although the Thai team was second to last when Puripol Boonson received the baton, he made a spectacular comeback to take third place, beating the French team by four hundredths of a second. Owing to this performance, Thailand won the bronze medal in 39.39 seconds, setting a new U20 national record.

=== 2025 ===
In May, at the World Relays held at the Guangdong Olympic Stadium in Guangzhou, the Thai team finished fifth in its second qualifying round.

A few weeks later, at the 2025 Asian Athletics Championships in Gumi, he won the silver medal in the 100-metre dash in 10.20 seconds, behind of Japan's Hiroki Yanagita. He also won a second silver medal with the Thai 4 × 100 m relay team, which finished in 38.78 seconds, beaten by hosts South Korea, who set a new championship record of 38.49 seconds (the previous record, 38.55 seconds, had been set by Thailand).

At the 2025 Summer World University Games, Boonson is the favourite in the 100-metre race, alongside his main rival Bayanda Walaza, 2024 world champion. He won the silver medal in 10.22 seconds, behind Walaza. He also took part in the final of the 4 × 100 m relay, in which Thailand finished fifth.

At the World Athletics Championships in Tokyo, he was eliminated in the semi-finals of the 100 metres, finishing second to last in his heat with a time of 10.17 seconds.

On 11 December, during the 2025 Southeast Asian Games, he broke the 10-second barrier in the 100-metre dash for the first time in his career, clocking in at 9.94 seconds. This performance made him the first Southeast Asian athlete to run under 10 seconds and placed him fifth in the all-time junior rankings for the distance, tied with Bayanda Walaza. He then won the 100-metre final in 10.00 seconds.

A few days later, he won the gold medal in the 200 metres with a time of 20.07 seconds, before also winning the 4 × 100 m relay in 38.28 seconds. Both performances set new national records.

=== 2026 ===
On 25 April, Boonson won the men's 60 metres at the 2026 Asian Beach Games in Sanya, China, in 6.62 seconds.

At the 2026 Asian Games in Nagoya, Boonson won the men's 100 metres on 25 September. He ran 9.91 seconds in the semi-final, breaking his previous Thai national record of 9.94 seconds and the Asian Games record of 9.92 seconds. In the final, he improved both records to 9.90 seconds to win the gold medal, becoming the second-fastest Asian man in history over 100 metres, behind only China's Su Bingtian, who holds the Asian record of 9.83 seconds.

Two days later, Boonson completed the sprint double by winning the men's 200 metres. He had set an Asian Games record of 20.10 seconds in the preliminary round before running 19.88 seconds in the final, equalling Xie Zhenye's Asian record set in 2019.

Boonson also competes in the 4 × 100 metres relay, in which the Thai team finishes fourth in 38.49 seconds. He subsequently wins a silver medal with Thailand in the mixed 4 × 100 metres relay, recording a time of 40.87 seconds and setting a new national record.

During the medal ceremony for the mixed 4 × 100 metres relay, Puripol Boonson gives his place on the podium to his teammate Chayut Kongprasit. Kongprasit had competed in the heats before being replaced by Boonson in the final. According to the protocol, only the four athletes who competed in the final are normally expected to stand on the podium during the official medal ceremony.

As these were Kongprasit's final Asian Games, Boonson nevertheless chose to give up his place on the podium for the official ceremony and photograph, allowing his teammate to share the moment with the other medalists.

With two gold medals in the 100 metres and 200 metres, along with two Asian Games records in those events and a tied Asian record in the 200 metres, Puripol Boonson was named the MVP of the 2026 Asian Games by the Olympic Council of Asia. He received a prize of US$25,000 on this occasion.

== Achievements ==
Information from World Athletics profile unless otherwise noted.

=== Personal bests ===
Distance	Time (s)	Wind	Location	Date	Notes
100 meters	9.90	+0.1 m/s	Nagoya, Japan	25 September 2026	NR
200 meters	19.88	−0.3 m/s	Nagoya, Japan	27 September 2026	=AR, NR
Youth and junior achievements
100 meters	9.94	+0.7 m/s	Bangkok, Thailand	11 December 2025	AU20R
200 meters	20.07	+0.2 m/s	Bangkok, Thailand	13 December 2025	AU20R

=== International competitions ===
Representing Thailand
Year	Competition	Venue	Position	Event	Time	Notes
2022	SEA Games	Hanoi, Viet Nam	1st	100 m	10.44	
2022	SEA Games	Hanoi, Viet Nam	1st	200 m	20.37	GR
2022	SEA Games	Hanoi, Viet Nam	1st	4 × 100 m relay	38.58	
2022	World U20 Championships	Cali, Colombia	4th	100 m	10.12	
2022	World U20 Championships	Cali, Colombia	8th (sf)	200 m	20.61	
2022	World U20 Championships	Cali, Colombia	17th (h)	4 × 100 m relay	42.09	SB
2022	Asian U18 Championships	Kuwait City, Kuwait	1st	100 m	10.33	CR
2022	Asian U18 Championships	Kuwait City, Kuwait	1st	200 m	21.53	
2022	Asian U18 Championships	Kuwait City, Kuwait	2nd	medley relay	1:55.82	
2023	SEA Games	Phnom Penh, Cambodia	-	200 m	DNF	
2023	Asian Championships	Bangkok, Thailand	1st	4 × 100 m relay	38.55	CR, NR
2023	Asian Games	Hangzhou, China	2nd	100 m	10.02	w
2023	Asian Games	Hangzhou, China	(sf)	200 m	DNF	
2023	Asian Games	Hangzhou, China	4th	4 × 100 m relay	38.81	
2024	Olympic Games	Paris, France	21st (sf)	100 m	10.14	
2024	World U20 Championships	Lima, Peru	2nd	100 m	10.22	
2024	World U20 Championships	Lima, Peru	3rd	4 × 100 m relay	39.39	NU20R
2025	Asian Championships	Gumi, South Korea	2nd	100 m	10.20 (.196)	
2025	Asian Championships	Gumi, South Korea	2nd	4 × 100 m relay	38.78	
2025	World University Games	Bochum, Germany	2nd	100 m	10.22	
2025	World University Games	Bochum, Germany	5th	4 × 100 m relay	39.34	
2025	World Championships	Tokyo, Japan	20th (sf)	100 m	10.17	
2025	SEA Games	Bangkok, Thailand	1st	100 m	10.00	
2025	SEA Games	Bangkok, Thailand	1st	200 m	20.07	GR, AU20R, NR
2025	SEA Games	Bangkok, Thailand	1st	4 × 100 m relay	38.28	GR, NR
2026	Asian Beach Games	Sanya, China	1st	60 m	6.62	
2026	Asian Beach Games	Sanya, China	2nd	4 × 60 m relay	26.68	
2026	Asian Relays Championships	Shaoxing, China	1st	Mixed 4 × 100 m relay	41.14	NR
2026	Asian Relays Championships	Shaoxing, China	2nd	4 × 100 m relay	38.28	= NR
2026	Asian Games	Nagoya, Japan	1st	100 m	9.90	GR, NR
2026	Asian Games	Nagoya, Japan	1st	200 m	19.88	GR, =AR, NR
2026	Asian Games	Nagoya, Japan	4th	4 × 100 m relay	38.49	
2026	Asian Games	Nagoya, Japan	2nd	Mixed 4 × 100 m relay	40.87	NR

=== Circuit wins ===
- World Athletics Continental Tour
  - 2022 (200 m): XXXII Qosanov Memorial
  - 2024 (100 m): XXXIII Qosanov Memorial
  - 2025 (100 m): The 3rd Belt and Road Athletics Invitational Meeting
  - 2026 (200 m): New Taipei City Athletics Open

Olympic Games
Preceded by Naphaswan Yangpaiboon; Savate Sresthaporn	Flag bearer for Thailand; Paris 2024 with Vareeraya Sukasem	Succeeded by Incumbent
Records
Preceded by (United States) Christian Miller	Boys' World Youth Best Holder, 100 metres 30 September 2023 – 26 July 2025 (shared with (United States) Christian Miller)	Succeeded by (Japan) Sorato Shimizu
