= Athletics at the 2025 Summer World University Games – Men's 200 metres =

Men's 200 metres at the 2025 Summer World University Games
- Venue: Lohrheidestadion
- Location: Bochum, Germany
- Dates: 23 July (heats); 24 July (semi-finals & final)
- Competitors: 51 from 38 nations
- Winning time: 20.63

Medalists
gold medal	Bayanda Walaza	South Africa
silver medal	Adrià Alfonso Medero	Spain
bronze medal	Lee Jae-seong	South Korea

The men's 200 metres event at the 2025 Summer World University Games was held in Bochum, Germany, at Lohrheidestadion on 23 and 24 July.

== Records ==
Prior to the competition, the records were as follows:

Record	Athlete (nation)	Time (s)	Location	Date
Games record	Pietro Mennea (ITA)	19.72	Mexico City, Mexico	12 September 1979

== Results ==
=== Heats ===
First 3 in each heat (Q) and the next 3 fastest (q) qualified for the semi-finals.

==== Heat 1 ====
Place	Athlete	Nation	Time	Notes
1	Animesh Kujur	India	21.16	Q
2	Valtteri Louko	Finland	21.31	Q
3	Huang Tso-chun	Chinese Taipei	21.46	Q
4	Jordan Soufi	Canada	21.74	
5	Joseph Okolimo	Uganda	21.84	
6	Dickson Edward Silayo	Tanzania	24.21	
			Wind: (−0.2 m/s)	

==== Heat 2 ====
Place	Athlete	Nation	Time	Notes
1	Bayanda Walaza	South Africa	20.93	Q
2	Łukasz Żok	Poland	21.06	Q
3	Zalán Deák	Hungary	21.23	Q
4	Muhd Azeem Fahmi	Malaysia	21.26	q
5	Harry Taylor	Great Britain	21.48	
6	Ka In Vong	Macau	22.35	
7	Brandon Pemberton	Virgin Islands	22.72	
			Wind: (±0.0 m/s)	

==== Heat 3 ====
Place	Athlete	Nation	Time	Notes
1	Zoltán Wahl	Hungary	20.93	Q, SB
2	Daniel Magogo	Zimbabwe	20.94	Q, PB
3	Seo Min-jun	South Korea	21.00	Q
4	Trelee Banks-Rose	United States	21.08	q
5	Hamzah al Jabri	Oman	21.29	q, PB
6	Emil Frænde	Denmark	21.32	PB
7	Robin Sapar	Estonia	21.75	
8	Isaac Benjamin Joseph	Haiti	21.77	
			Wind: (+0.5 m/s)	

==== Heat 4 ====
Place	Athlete	Nation	Time	Notes
1	Christopher Ius	Australia	21.02	Q
2	Tomáš Němejc	Czech Republic	21.14	Q
3	Filip Federič	Slovakia	21.55	Q
4	Anže Verbovšek	Slovenia	21.64	
5	Magnus Johannsson	Hong Kong	21.76 [.756]	
6	Abdulaziz Al-Shahrani	Saudi Arabia	21.76 [.757]	SB
7	Hope Zemba	Zambia	24.01	
8	Sarzil Hasan Khan Zedan	Bangladesh	24.73	
			Wind: (+1.5 m/s)	

==== Heat 5 ====
Place	Athlete	Nation	Time	Notes
1	Eckhart Potgieter	South Africa	20.95	Q
2	David Chapman	Great Britain	21.06	Q, SB
3	Tommy Te Puni	New Zealand	21.18	Q
4	Manikanta Hoblidhar	India	21.42	
5	Beppe Grillo	Malta	21.51	
6	Yan Teo	Singapore	21.62	
7	Santiago Paul Llerena	Ecuador	22.45	
			Wind: (+1.4 m/s)	

==== Heat 6 ====
Place	Athlete	Nation	Time	Notes
1	Lee Jae-seong	South Korea	20.60	Q
2	Adrià Alfonso Medero	Spain	20.65	Q
3	King Wai Yip	Hong Kong	21.24	Q
4	Jakub Nemec	Slovakia	21.37	
5	Jurij Beber	Slovenia	21.52	
6	Joshua Duckman	Canada	21.76	
7	Chanyourong Noeb	Cambodia	22.02	PB
			Wind: (+1.0 m/s)	

==== Heat 7 ====
Place	Athlete	Nation	Time	Notes
1	Aidan Murphy	Australia	21.04	Q
2	Isaac Kundu Omurwa	Kenya	21.28	Q
3	Genta Iki	Japan	21.61	Q
4	Tsung-Han Lin	Chinese Taipei	21.62	
5	Aidil Auf Hajam	Malaysia	21.69	
6	Juan Martin Barbas	Argentina	21.82	PB
7	Khalid Saud Al-Maashari	Oman	22.62	
8	Jorge Luis Mendoza Galindo	Honduras	23.11	
			Wind: (+0.7 m/s)	

=== Semi-finals ===
First 2 in each heat (Q) and the next 2 fastest (q) qualified for the final.

==== Heat 1 ====
Place	Athlete	Nation	Time	Notes
1	Bayanda Walaza	South Africa	20.76	Q
2	Adrià Alfonso Medero	Spain	20.77	Q
3	Christopher Ius	Australia	20.85	q
4	Valtteri Louko	Finland	21.24	
5	David Chapman	Great Britain	21.32 [.318]	
6	Zalán deák	Hungary	21.32 [.318]	
7	Muhd Azeem Fahmi	Malaysia	21.51	
8	Filip Federič	Slovakia	21.74	
			Wind: (−0.8 m/s)	

==== Heat 2 ====
Place	Athlete	Nation	Time	Notes
1	Lee Jae-seong	South Korea	20.73	Q
2	Aidan Murphy	Australia	20.94 [.933]	Q
3	Animesh Kujur	India	20.94 [.937]	q
4	Tomáš Němejc	Czech Republic	21.19	
5	Isaac Kundu Omurwa	Kenya	21.20	
6	Huang Tso-chun	Chinese Taipei	21.31	
7	King Wai Yip	Hong Kong	21.37	
			Wind: (−1.0 m/s)	

==== Heat 3 ====
Place	Athlete	Nation	Time	Notes
1	Daniel Magogo	Zimbabwe	21.00	Q
2	Eckhart Potgieter	South Africa	21.06	Q
3	Seo Min-jun	South Korea	21.17	
4	Łukasz Żok	Poland	21.18	
5	Zoltán Wahl	Hungary	21.20	
6	Tommy Te Puni	New Zealand	21.21	
7	Trelee Banks-Rose	United States	21.23	
8	Genta Iki	Japan	23.08	
			Wind: (−1.0 m/s)	

=== Final ===
Place	Athlete	Nation	Time	Notes
1st place, gold medalist(s)	Bayanda Walaza	South Africa	20.63	
2nd place, silver medalist(s)	Adrià Alfonso Medero	Spain	20.70	
3rd place, bronze medalist(s)	Lee Jae-seong	South Korea	20.75	
4	Animesh Kujur	India	20.85	
5	Aidan Murphy	Australia	20.92	
6	Daniel Magogo	Zimbabwe	21.00	
7	Christopher Ius	Australia	21.01	
—	Eckhart Potgieter	South Africa	DQ	TR 17.2.3
			Wind: (−0.3 m/s)	
