= 2025 Asian Athletics Championships – Men's 4 × 100 metres relay =

Men's 4 × 100 metres relay at the 2025 Asian Athletics Championships
- Venue: Gumi Civic Stadium
- Location: Gumi, South Korea
- Dates: 30 May (heats); 31 May (final)
- Winning time: 38.49 CR

Medalists
gold medal	Seo Min-jun; Joeljin Nwamadi; Lee Jae-seong; Lee Jun-hyeok	South Korea
silver medal	Natawat Iamudom; Thawatchai Himaiad; Chayut Khongprasit; Puripol Boonson	Thailand
bronze medal	Yat Lok Chan; Lee Hong Kit; Chun Ting Kwok; Magnus Johannsson	Hong Kong

The men's 4 × 100 metres relay event at the 2025 Asian Athletics Championships was held on 30 and 31 May.

== Schedule ==
The event schedule, in local time (UTC+9), was as follows:

Date	Time	Round
30 May	12:45	Heats
31 May	19:40	Final

== Results ==
=== Heats ===
==== Heat 1 ====
Place	Nation	Athletes	Time	Notes
1	South Korea	Seo Min-jun, Nwamadi Joel-jin, Lee Jae-seong, Lee Jun-hyeok	38.67	Q, SB
2	Thailand	Natawat Iamudom, Thawatchai Himaiad, Chayut Khongprasit, Puripol Boonson	39.18	Q, PB
3	Chinese Taipei	Wei Tai-sheng, Lin Po-hsun, Huang Tso-chun, Li Yun-chen	43.89	Q
—	Sri Lanka	H.D.M.C.B. Dissanayake, Chamod Yodasinghe, Dineth Induwara Weeraratna, Yupun Abeykoon	DNF	
—	India	Gurav Pranav, Ragul Kumar, Manikanta Hoblidhar, Amlan Borgohain	DQ	TR 24.7

==== Heat 2 ====
Place	Nation	Athletes	Time	Notes
1	China	Chen Jinfeng, Zeng Keli, Wang Shengjie, He Jinxian	38.95	Q, SB
2	Hong Kong	Chan Yat Lok, Lee Hong Kit, Kwok Chun Ting, Magnus Johannsson	39.24	Q, PB
3	Singapore	Daryl Tan, Tate Tan, Xander Ho Ann Heng, Marc Brian Louis	40.08	Q
4	Indonesia	Wahyu Setiawan, Sudirman Hadi, Rico Adith, Bayu Kertanegara	40.55	q
—	Malaysia	Russel Alexander Nasir Taib, Jonathan Nyepa, Aidil Auf Hajam, Danish Iftikhar Muh. Roslee	DQ	TR 24.7

=== Final ===
Place	Nation	Athletes	Time	Notes
1st place, gold medalist(s)	South Korea	Seo Min-jun, Nwamadi Joel-jin, Lee Jae-seong, Lee Jun-hyeok	38.49	CR, NR
2nd place, silver medalist(s)	Thailand	Natawat Iamudom, Thawatchai Himaiad, Chayut Khongprasit, Puripol Boonson	38.78	PB
3rd place, bronze medalist(s)	Hong Kong	Chan Yat Lok, Lee Hong Kit, Kwok Chun Ting, Magnus Johannsson	39.10	
4	Chinese Taipei	Chen Jian-rong, Wei Tai-sheng, Huang Yan-jyun, Li Yun-chen	40.14	
5	Indonesia	Wahyu Setiawan, Sudirman Hadi, Rico Adith, Bayu Kertanegara	40.15	
—	China	Shi Junhao, Zeng Keli, Wang Shengjie, He Jinxian	DQ	TR 24.7
—	Singapore	Daryl Tan, Yan Teo, Xander Ho Ann Heng, Marc Brian Louis	DQ	TR 24.7
