= List of Asian under-20 records in athletics =

Asian junior records in the sport of athletics are ratified by the Asian Athletics. Athletics records comprise the best performance of an athlete before the year of their 20th birthday. Technically, in all under 20 age divisions, the age is calculated "on December 31 of the year of competition" to avoid age group switching during a competitive season. The AAA maintains these records only in a specific list of outdoor events. All other records, including all indoor records, shown on this list are tracked by statisticians not officially sanctioned by the world governing body.

== Outdoor ==
Key: Awaiting ratification Not an Asian Athletics record event Not ratified or later rescinded by Asian Athletics

=== Men ===
Event	Record	Athlete	Nationality	Date	Meet	Place	Age	Ref.
100 m	9.94 (+0.7 m/s)	Puripol Boonson	Thailand	11 December 2025	SEA Games	Bangkok, Thailand	19 years, 332 days	
200 m	20.07 (+0.2 m/s)	Puripol Boonson	Thailand	13 December 2025	SEA Games	Bangkok, Thailand	19 years, 334 days	
300 m	32.81	Yuzo Kanemaru	Japan	23 April 2006		Taisha, Japan	18 years, 217 days	
400 m	44.27	Abdalelah Haroun	Qatar	5 July 2015	36th Résisprint International Athletics Meeting	La Chaux-de-Fonds, Switzerland	18 years, 185 days	
800 m	1:44.02	Bilal Mansour Ali	Bahrain	9 September 2007		Rieti, Italy		
1000 m	2:15.23	Belal Mansoor Ali	Bahrain	7 August 2007	DN-galan	Stockholm, Sweden	18 years, 294 days	
1500 m	3:31.49	Bilal Mansour Ali	Bahrain	2 July 2007		Athens, Greece		
Mile	3:50.90	Hamza Driouch	Qatar	7 June 2012	Bislett Games	Oslo, Norway	17 years, 204 days	
3000 m	7:47.65	Aadam Ismaeel Khamis	Bahrain	22 June 2006	CAA Grand Prix d'Alger	Algiers, Algeria	17 years, 130 days	
5000 m	13:17.10	Essa Ismail Rashed	Qatar	29 May 2005	THALES FBK-Games	Hengelo, Netherlands	18 years, 166 days	
10,000 m	27:21.52	Kazuma Maeda	Japan	3 May 2024	Japanese 10,000m Championships	Fukuroi, Japan	19 years, 108 days	
Half marathon	1:01:38	Kazura Munakata	Japan	17 November 2024	Ageo City Half Marathon	Ageo, Japan	19 years, 312 days	
110 m hurdles (99.0 cm)	12.96 (−0.3 m/s)	Chen Yuanjiang	China	24 June 2025	Chinese U20 Championships	Taizhou, China	19 years, 148 days	
110 m hurdles (106.7 cm)	13.12 (+1.6 m/s)	Liu Xiang	China	2 July 2002	Athletissima	Lausanne, Switzerland	18 years, 354 days	
300 m hurdles	35.47	Yu Hashimoto	Japan	14 October 2024	National Sports Festival	Saga, Japan	18 years, 142 days	
400 m hurdles	48.09	Taiju Goto	Japan	14 June 2026	Japan Championships in Athletics	Nagoya, Japan	17 years, 40 days	
400 m hurdles	47.93	Taiju Goto	Japan	28 September 2026	Asian Games	Nagoya, Japan	17 years, 146 days	
2000 m steeplechase	5:30.9+	Ryuji Miura	Japan	30 July 2021	Olympic Games	Tokyo, Japan	19 years, 169 days	
2000 m steeplechase	5:23.95	Tareq Mubarak Taher	Bahrain	15 July 2005	World Youth Championships	Marrakesh, Morocco	18 years, 226 days	
3000 m steeplechase	8:07.18	Musa Amer Obaid	Qatar	24 August 2004		Athens, Greece	19 years, 128 days	
High jump	2.33 m	Zhu Jianhua	China	1 December 1982		New Delhi, India	19 years, 186 days	
Pole vault	5.65 m	Masaki Ejima	Japan	6 July 2017	Asian Championships	Bhubaneswar, India	18 years, 122 days	
Long jump	8.31 m (+0.8 m/s)	Shi Yuhao	China	25 June 2017	Chinese Athletics Street Tour	Beijing, China	18 years, 364 days	
Triple jump	17.23 m (±0.0 m/s)	Gu Junjie	China	26 September 2004		Hefei, China	19 years, 144 days	
Shot put (6 kg)	20.63 m	Li Meng	China	21 October 2011		Nanchang, China		
Shot put (6 kg)	20.65 m	Park Si-hoon	South Korea	28 May 2026	Asian U20 Championships	Hong Kong, China	19 years, 97 days	
Shot put (7.26 kg)	19.48 m	Xie Shengying	China	25 April 1990		Shijiazhuang, China		
Discus throw (1.75 kg)	66.47 m	Moaaz Mohamed Ibrahim	Qatar	3 February 2018		Cape Town, South Africa	18 years, 360 days	
Discus throw (2.0 kg)	62.36 m	Tulake Nuermaimaiti	China	21 November 2001		Guangzhou, China		
Discus throw (2.0 kg)	62.40 m	Rashid Shafi Al-Dosari	Qatar	1 May 2000		Doha, Qatar	18 years, 359 days	
Hammer throw (6 kg)	85.57 m	Ashraf Amgad Elseify	Qatar	14 July 2012	World Junior Championships	Barcelona, Spain	17 years, 145 days	
Hammer throw (7.26 kg)	76.37 m	Ashraf Amgad El-Seify	Qatar	10 April 2013	Gulf Cooperation Council Championships	Doha, Qatar	18 years, 49 days	
Javelin throw (800 g)	86.48 m	Neeraj Chopra	India	23 July 2016	World U20 Championships	Bydgoszcz, Poland	18 years, 212 days	
Decathlon	8041 pts	Qi Haifeng	China	9–10 October 2002	Asian Games	Busan, South Korea	19 years, 64 days	
Decathlon	100m (wind) / Long jump (wind) / Shot put / High jump / 400m / 110m H (wind) / Discus / Pole vault / Javelin / 1500m; 11.09 / 7.22 m / 13.05 m / 2.06 m / 49.09 / 14.54 / 43.16 m / 4.80 m / 61.04 m / 4:35.17							
5000 m walk (track)	18:43.70	Pu Huajia	China	8 August 2026	World U20 Championships	Eugene, United States	19 years, 69 days	
10,000 m walk (track)	39:08.23	Daisuke Matsunaga	Japan	14 December 2013		Tokyo, Japan	18 years, 265 days	
10,000 m walk (track)	38:44.88	Sohtaroh Osaka	Japan	26 April 2025	All Japan University Challenge	Hiratsuka, Japan	19 years, 85 days	
10 km walk (road)	37:44	Wang Zhen	China	18 September 2010		Beijing, China	19 years, 25 days	
20,000 m walk (track)	1:20:11.72	Li Gaobo	China	2 November 2007		Wuhan, China	18 years, 182 days	
20 km walk (road)	1:18:07	Li Gaobo	China	23 April 2005		Cixi City, China	15 years, 354 days	
35 km walk (road)	2:47:19	Raj Mishra	India	15 February 2023 (Note: 15 February 2022 by additional AAA source, probably a typo)	Indian Race Walking Championships	Ranchi, India	18 years, 225 days	
50 km walk (road)	3:41:10	Zhao Jianguo	China	16 April 2006		Wajima, Japan	18 years, 87 days	
4 × 100 m relay	39.01	Kazuma Ōseto; Akiyuki Hashimoto; Aska Cambridge; Kazuki Kanamori	Japan	13 July 2012	World Junior Championships	Barcelona, Spain	17 years, 343 days 17 years, 238 days 19 years, 43 days	
4 × 100 m relay	39.01	Ippei Takeda; Jun Yamashita; Wataru Inuzuka; Kenta Oshima	Japan	23 July 2016	World U20 Championships	Bydgoszcz, Poland		
4 × 400 m relay	3:04.11	Julian Jrummi Walsh; Kaisei Yui; Takamasa Kitagawa; Nobuya Kato	Japan	27 July 2014	World Junior Championships	Eugene, United States	17 years, 325 days	

=== Women ===
Event	Record	Athlete	Nationality	Date	Meet	Place	Age	Ref.
100 m	11.10 (+0.7 m/s)	Chen Yujie	China	17 November 2025	National Games of China	Guangzhou, China	16 years, 323 days	
100 m	11.06 (−0.4 m/s)	Chen Yujie	China	25 September 2026	Asian Games	Nagoya, Japan	17 years, 270 days	
200 m	22.74 (+0.6 m/s)	Edidiong Odiong	Bahrain	15 August 2016	Olympic Games	Rio de Janeiro, Brazil	19 years, 155 days	
300 m	37.25	Hima Das	India	17 August 2019	Rieter atletický mítink	Ústí nad Orlicí, Czech Republic	19 years, 220 days	
400 m	49.88	Salwa Eid Naser	Bahrain	1 September 2017	Memorial Van Damme	Brussels, Belgium	19 years, 101 days	
800 m	1:57.18	Wang Yuan	China	8 September 1993	National Games of China	Beijing, China	17 years, 153 days	
1500 m	3:51.34	Lang Yinglai	China	18 October 1997	National Games of China	Shanghai, China	18 years, 57 days	
3000 m	8:36.45	Ma Ningning	China	6 June 1993	Chinese Championships	Jinan, China		
5000 m	14:39.96	Yin Lili	China	23 October 1997	National Games of China	Shanghai, China	17 years, 346 days	
10,000 m	30:31.55	Xing Huina	China	23 August 2003	World Championships	Saint-Denis, France	19 years, 179 days	
10 km (road)	31:49	Wei Yanan	China	10 October 1999		Beijing, China	17 years, 308 days	
Half marathon	1:09:45	Reia Iwade	Japan	23 December 2013	Sanyo Women's Half Marathon	Okayama, Japan	19 years, 15 days	
100 m hurdles (84 cm)	12.92 (±0.0 m/s)	Sun Hongwei	China	18 October 1997	National Games of China	Shanghai, China		
300 m hurdles	40.20	Mariam Kareem	United Arab Emirates	18 July 2026	Night of Athletics	Heusden-Zolder, Belgium	18 years, 174 days	
400 m hurdles (76.2 cm)	54.40	Wang Xing	China	21 October 2005	National Games of China	Nanjing, China		
400 m hurdles (76.2 cm)	54.31	Mariam Kareem	United Arab Emirates	28 September 2026	Asian Games	Nagoya, Japan	18 years, 246 days	
2000 m steeplechase	6:14.34	Tigest Getent	Bahrain	6 September 2015	ISTAF	Berlin, Germany	18 years, 61 days	
3000 m steeplechase	9:10.74	Winfred Mutile Yavi	Bahrain	20 July 2018	Herculis	Fontvieille, Monaco	18 years, 201 days	
High jump	1.95 m	Tatyana Efimenko	Kyrgyzstan	6 October 1999		Bishkek, Kyrgyzstan	18 years, 277 days	
Pole vault	4.45 m	Zhang Yingning	China	29 October 2006		Changsha, China		
Pole vault	4.45 m	Li Ling	China	12 April 2008		Hangzhou, China	18 years, 281 days	
Long jump	6.80 m (±0.0 m/s)	Peng Fengmei	China	18 April 1998		Chengdu, China		
Triple jump	14.57 m (+0.2 m/s)	Huang Qiuyan	China	19 October 1997	National Games of China	Shanghai, China	17 years, 287 days	
Shot put (4.0 kg)	20.02 m	Cheng Xiaoyan	China	5 June 1994	Chinese Championships	Beijing, China	18 years, 167 days	
Discus throw (1.0 kg)	66.08 m	Cao Qi	China	12 September 1993	National Games of China	Beijing, China	19 years, 240 days	
Hammer throw (4.0 kg)	77.24 m	Zhang Jiale	China	2 August 2025	Chinese Championships	Quzhou, China	18 years, 284 days	
Javelin throw	65.89 m	Ziyi Yan	China	3 August 2025	Chinese Championships	Quzhou, China	17 years, 73 days	
Javelin throw	71.74 m	Yan Ziyi	China	23 May 2026	Xiamen Diamond League	Xiamen, China	18 years, 1 day	
Heptathlon	6185 pts	Shen Shengfei	China	17–18 October 1997	National Games of China	Shanghai, China		
Heptathlon	100m H (wind) / High jump / Shot put / 200m (wind) / Long jump (wind) / Javelin / 800m; 14.23 / 1.83 m / 14.37 m / 24.13 / 5.93 m / 44.50 m / 2:17.81							
5000 m walk (track)	20:37.7 h	Jin Bingjie	China	3 March 1990		Hefei, China	18 years, 336 days	
5 km walk (road)	21:05	Yang Xizhen	China	8 April 2023	Chinese Race Walking Grand Prix 2	Taicang, China	17 years, 28 days	
10,000 m walk (track)	42:49.7 h	Gao Hongmiao	China	15 March 1992		Jinan, China	17 years, 364 days	
10 km walk (road)	41:57	Gao Hongmiao	China	8 September 1993	National Games of China	Beijing, China	17 years, 364 days	
20,000 m walk (track)	1:29:32.4 h	Song Hongjuan	China	24 October 2003		Changsha, China	19 years, 112 days	
20 km walk (road)	1:27:01	Lu Xiuzhi	China	30 March 2012	IAAF World Race Walking Challenge	Taicang, China	18 years, 156 days	
4 × 100 m relay	44.44	Chen Yiting; Jiang Yifan; Wang Yu; Ma Chengna	China	16 August 2019		Taiyuan, China		
4 × 400 m relay	3:32.59	Chen Yumei; Wang Hui; Wen Xiuyun; Li Xueji	China	20 August 2006	World Junior Championships	Beijing, China		

=== Mixed ===
Event	Record	Athlete	Nationality	Date	Meet	Place	Age	Ref.
4 × 400 m relay	3:17.76 A	Rupal Chaudhary; Kapil; Priya Mohan; Barath Sridhar	India	2 August 2022	World U20 Championships	Cali, Colombia		

== Indoor ==
=== Men ===
Event	Record	Athlete	Nationality	Date	Meet	Place	Age	Ref.
60 m	6.59	Yoshihide Kiryu	Japan	9 February 2014	Japanese Junior Championships	Osaka, Japan	18 years, 56 days	
200 m	21.23	Shinji Takahira	Japan	22 February 2003	Japan-China International Match	Yokohama, Japan	18 years, 219 days	
400 m	45.39	Abdalleleh Haroun	Qatar	19 February 2015	XL Galan	Stockholm, Sweden	16 years, 61 days	
500 m	59.83	Abdalleleh Haroun	Qatar	17 February 2016	Globen Galan	Stockholm, Sweden	17 years, 59 days	
800 m	1:48.06	Belal Mansoor Ali	Bahrain	11 February 2006	Reunión Internacional de Atletismo	Valencia, Spain	17 years, 117 days	
1000 m	2:21.45	Belal Mansoor Ali	Bahrain	4 February 2006	Sparkassen Cup	Stuttgart, Germany	17 years, 110 days	
1500 m	3:36.28	Belal Mansoor Ali	Bahrain	20 February 2007	GE Galan	Stockholm, Sweden	18 years, 126 days	
3000 m	7:50.10	Aadam Ismaeel Khamis	Bahrain	11 February 2006	Asian Championships	Pattaya, Thailand	16 years, 364 days	
5000 m								
60 m hurdles								
60 m hurdles (99.0 cm)	7.61	Rashiddo Muratake	Japan	1 February 2020	Japanese U20 Championships	Osaka, Japan	17 years, 360 days	
High jump	2.25 m	Mutaz Essa Barshim	Qatar	13 February 2010		Gothenburg, Sweden	18 years, 234 days	
Pole vault	5.62 m	Zhang Wei	China	7 February 2013	University Championships	Lyon, France	18 years, 322 days	
Long jump	8.03 m	Zhang Xiaoyi	China	16 March 2007	Chinese Indoor Grand Prix	Shanghai, China	17 years, 295 days	
Triple jump	16.57 m	Zhu Shujing	China	8 February 2004	Asian Championships	Tehran, Iran	18 years, 260 days	
Shot put								
Heptathlon								
Heptathlon	60m / Long jump / Shot put / High jump / 60m H / Pole vault / 1000m							
5000 m walk								
4 × 400 m relay								

=== Women ===
Event	Record	Athlete	Nationality	Date	Meet	Place	Age	Ref.
60 m	7.23	Liang Xiaojing	China	3 March 2016	National Grand Prix	Nanjing, China	18 years, 331 days	
200 m	23.74	Zou Yiting	China	19 February 2004	Chinese National Grand Prix	Tianjin, China	17 years, 155 days	
400 m	52.27	Li Yajun	China	24 February 1996	Chinese Championships	Beijing, China	18 years, 218 days	
800 m	2:02.90	Liu Qing	China	1 March 2005	China-Japan International Match	Tianjin, China	18 years, 307 days	
1500 m	4:12.70	Xie Sainan	China	19 February 2005	Chinese National Grand Prix	Shanghai, China	18 years, 108 days	
Mile	4:43.70	Nozomi Musembi Takamatsu	Japan	29 January 2016	TrackTown USA High Performance Meet	Portland, United States	18 years, 151 days	
3000 m	9:03.67	Xue Fei	China	7 March 2008	World Championships	Valencia, Spain	18 years, 212 days	
5000 m								
60 m hurdles	8.25	Wu Binbin	China	27 January 2024	Astana Indoor Meeting	Astana, Kazakhstan	17 years, 273 days	
High jump	1.92 m	Zheng Xingjuan	China	21 March 2007	National Indoor Grand Prix	Beijing, China	18 years, 1 day	
Pole vault	4.46 m	Zhang Yingning	China	15 March 2007	Chinese Indoor Grand Prix	Shanghai, China	17 years, 68 days	
Long jump	6.65 m	Guan Yingnan	China	27 February 1996	China-Japan-South Korea International Match	Tianjin, China	18 years, 308 days	
Triple jump	14.37 m	Ren Ruiping	China	11 March 1995	World Championships	Barcelona, Spain	19 years, 38 days	
Shot put	19.07 m	Gong Lijiao	China	16 March 2007	Chinese Indoor Grand Prix	Shanghai, China	18 years, 51 days	
Pentathlon								
Pentathlon	60m H / High jump / Shot put / Long jump / 800m							
3000 m walk								
4 × 400 m relay								
