= Maldives at the 2026 Asian Games =

- IOC code: MDV
- NOC: Maldives Olympic Committee

in Aichi–Nagoya, Japan September 19 – October 4, 2026
- Competitors: 81 in 7 sports
- Medals: Gold 0 Silver 0 Bronze 0 Total 0

Asian Games appearances (overview)
- 1982; 1986; 1990; 1994; 1998; 2002; 2006; 2010; 2014; 2018; 2022; 2026

Maldives competed at the 2026 Asian Games in Aichi Prefecture and Nagoya, Japan, held from September 19 to October 4, 2026.

== Competitors ==
The following is the list of number of competitors in the Games.

Sport	Men	Women	Total
Athletics	6	0	6
Badminton	2	2	4
Shooting	6	6	12
Surfing	2	2	4
Swimming	2	2	4
Table tennis	2	2	4
Volleyball	2	2	4
Total	24	18	42

== Athletics ==
Key

- Note–Ranks given for track events are within the athlete's heat only
- Q = Qualified for the next round
- q = Qualified for the next round as a fastest loser or, in field events, by position without achieving the qualifying target
- NR = National record
- N/A = Round not applicable for the event
- Bye = Athlete not required to compete in round

Track events
Men

Athlete	Event	Heat		Semifinal		Final	
Athlete	Event	Result	Rank	Result	Rank	Result	Rank
Hassan Saaid	100 m	10.85	6	Did not advance			
Ibadulla Adam	100 m	11.06	6	Did not advance			
Ibrahim Naahil Nizaar	200 m	22.62	5	Did not advance			
Zu Iz Mohamed Suad	200 m	22.70	7	Did not advance			
Riffath Adam	400 m	49.61	8	—N/a		Did not advance	
Zeek Suad Hussain	400 m	50.77	9	—N/a		Did not advance	
Hassan Saaid; Ibadulla Adam; Ibrahim Naahil Nizaar; Riffath Adam; Zeek Suad Hussain; Zu Iz Mohamed Suad	4 × 100 m relay	41.76	7	—N/a		Did not advance	
Hassan Saaid; Ibadulla Adam; Ibrahim Naahil Nizaar; Riffath Adam; Zeek Suad Hussain; Zu Iz Mohamed Suad	4 × 400 m relay	3:18.54	4	—N/a		Did not advance	

== Badminton ==
Men

Athlete	Event	Round of 64	Round of 32	Round of 16	Quarterfinals	Semifinals	Final	
Athlete	Event	Opposition Score	Opposition Score	Opposition Score	Opposition Score	Opposition Score	Opposition Score	Rank
Ahmed Nibal	Singles	Bye	Nettasinghe (SRI); L 0–2	Did not advance				
Hussein Zayan Shaheed	Singles	Munkhbat (MGL); L 0–2	Did not advance					
Ahmed Nibal; Hussein Zayan Shaheed	Doubles	—N/a	Kang / Ki (KOR); L 0–2	Did not advance				

Women

Athlete	Event	Round of 64	Round of 32	Round of 16	Quarterfinals	Semifinals	Final	
Athlete	Event	Opposition Score	Opposition Score	Opposition Score	Opposition Score	Opposition Score	Opposition Score	Rank
Aminath Nabeeha Abdul Razzaq	Singles	Tselmeg-od (MGL); W 2–0	Lo (HKG); L 0–2	Did not advance				
Fathimath Nabaaha Abdul Razzaq	Singles	Bye	Yeo (SGP); L 0–2	Did not advance				
Aminath Nabeeha Abdul Razzaq; Fathimath Nabaaha Abdul Razzaq	Doubles	—N/a	Sudjaipraparat / Aimsaard (THA); L 0–2	Did not advance				

Mixed

Athlete	Event	Round of 32	Round of 16	Quarterfinals	Semifinals	Final	
Athlete	Event	Opposition Score	Opposition Score	Opposition Score	Opposition Score	Opposition Score	Rank
Ahmed Nibal; Aminath Nabeeha Abdul Razzaq	Doubles	Kapila / Crasto (IND); L 0–2	Did not advance				
Fathimath Nabaaha Abdul Razzaq; Hussein Zayan Shaheed	Doubles	Joaquin / Ramadhanti (INA); L 0–2	Did not advance				

== Shooting ==
Men

Athlete	Event	Qualification		Final	
Athlete	Event	Points	Rank	Points	Rank
Mohamed Subhaath Hamid Shafeeg	10 m air pistol	539-10x	60	Did not advance	
Thoha Maadh Mohamed	10 m air pistol	554-8x	56	Did not advance	
Ziyau Ziyan	10 m air pistol	559-8x	49	Did not advance	
Mohamed Subhaath Hamid Shafeeg; Thoha Maadh Mohamed; Ziyau Ziyan	10 m air pistol team	—N/a		1652-26x	15
Ahmed Maaidh Mohamed	10 m air rifle	614.5	40	Did not advance	
Shifan Ibrahim	10 m air rifle	597.3	45	Did not advance	
Umar Mohamed Nasheed	10 m air rifle	610.2	43	Did not advance	
Ahmed Maaidh Mohamed; Shifan Ibrahim; Umar Mohamed Nasheed	10 m air rifle team	—N/a		1822.0	13

Women

Athlete	Event	Qualification		Final	
Athlete	Event	Points	Rank	Points	Rank
Fathimath Faiha Fazeel	10 m air pistol	510-7x	55	Did not advance	
Mariyam Eshal Misbah	10 m air pistol	558-12x	41	Did not advance	
Mariyam Malak Mohamed Muslih	10 m air pistol	516-4x	54	Did not advance	
Fathimath Faiha Fazeel; Mariyam Eshal Misbah; Mariyam Malak Mohamed Muslih	10 m air pistol team	—N/a		1584-23x	13
Aishath Easha Shaheed	10 m air rifle	624.1	29	Did not advance	
Aishath Een Aslam	10 m air rifle	609.9	53	Did not advance	
Ayna Shoua Akhthar Ibrahim	10 m air rifle	599.5	54	Did not advance	
Aishath Easha Shaheed; Aishath Een Aslam; Ayna Shoua Akhthar Ibrahim	10 m air rifle team	—N/a		1833.5	15

Mixed

Athlete	Event	Qualification		Final	
Athlete	Event	Points	Rank	Points	Rank
Mariyam Eshal Misbah; Ziyau Ziyan	10 m air pistol team	557-14x	20	Did not advance	
Aishath Easha Shaheed; Ahmed Maaidh Mohamed	10 m air rifle team	617.5	14	Did not advance	

== Surfing ==
Surfer	Event	Heat		Round 2	Round 3	Quarterfinal	Semifinal	Final / BM	
Surfer	Event	Score	Rank	Opposition Result	Opposition Result	Opposition Result	Opposition Result	Opposition Result	Rank
Kayan Abdulla Areef	Men's shortboard	8.50	2 R2	Natthakron (THA); L 5.67–11.20	Did not advance				
Yasin Ahmed Nashid	Men's shortboard	5.43	3 R2	Amu (AFG); W 8.13–2.14	Wu (CHN); L 8.44–10.93	Did not advance			
Aminath Thaanees Shiran	Women's shortboard	1.43	2 R2	Rashid (MAS); L 1.30–2.60	Did not advance				
Mariyam Rahil Naseem	Women's shortboard	1.33	3 R2	Lee N-l (KOR); L 1.20–8.20	Did not advance				

Qualification legend: R3 - Qualifies to elimination rounds; R2 - Qualifies to repechage round

== Swimming ==
Men

Athlete	Event	Heat		Final	
Athlete	Event	Time	Rank	Time	Rank
Mohamed Rihan Shiham	50 m backstroke	29.64	27	Did not advance	
Mohamed Rihan Shiham	100 m backstroke	1:06.34	29	Did not advance	
Mohamed Rihan Shiham	400 m individual medley	5:06.92	21	Did not advance	
Looth Mohamed Hussain	50 m breaststroke	30.98	37	Did not advance	
Looth Mohamed Hussain	100 m breaststroke	1:11.69	35	Did not advance	
Looth Mohamed Hussain	200 m breaststroke	2:41.95	23	Did not advance	

Women

Athlete	Event	Heat		Final	
Athlete	Event	Time	Rank	Time	Rank
Meral Ayn Latheef	50 m freestyle	28.88	27	Did not advance	
Meral Ayn Latheef	100 m freestyle	1:04.37	31	Did not advance	
Meral Ayn Latheef	100 m breaststroke	1:22.06	24	Did not advance	
Malaika Linda Imran	50 m backstroke	35.90	30	Did not advance	
Malaika Linda Imran	100 m backstroke	1:20.57	27	Did not advance	
Malaika Linda Imran	200 m backstroke	2:55.31	21	Did not advance	

== Table tennis ==
Singles

Athlete	Event	Round of 64	Round of 32	Round of 16	Quarterfinals	Semifinals	Final	
Athlete	Event	Opposition Score	Opposition Score	Opposition Score	Opposition Score	Opposition Score	Opposition Score	Rank
Moosa Munsif Ahmed	Men	Alamiyan (IRI); L 0–4	Did not advance					
Mohamed Shaffan Ismail	Men	Tancharoen (THA); L 1–4	Did not advance					
Aishath Rafa Nazim	Women	Mahi (BAN); W 4–2	Paranang (THA); L 0–4	Did not advance				
Fathimath Dheema Ali	Women	Kim K-y (PRK); L 0–4	Did not advance					

Doubles

Athlete	Event	Round of 64	Round of 32	Round of 16	Quarterfinals	Semifinals	Final	
Athlete	Event	Opposition Score	Opposition Score	Opposition Score	Opposition Score	Opposition Score	Opposition Score	Rank
Moosa Munsif Ahmed; Mohamed Shaffan Ismail	Men	Faraji / Ghaffari (IRI); L 2–3	Did not advance					
Akhyar Ahmed Khalid; Mohamed Khalaf Rafiu	Men	Bye	Chan / Wong CT (HKG); L 0–3	Did not advance				
Aishath Alsaa Nafiz; Mishka Mohamed Ibrahim	Women	Bye	Shin Y-b / Joo C-h (KOR); L 0–3	Did not advance				
Aishath Rafa Nazim; Fathimath Dheema Ali	Women	Putri / Rasmi (INA); L 2–3	Did not advance					
Aishath Rafa Nazim; Moosa Munsif Ahmed	Mixed	Bye	Ankhbayar / Ser-Od (MGL); W 3–2	Shah / Chitale (IND); L 0–3	Did not advance			
Fathimath Dheema Ali; Mohamed Shaffan Ismail	Mixed	Bye	Desai / Ghorpade (IND); L 2–3	Did not advance				

Team

Team	Event	Group stage			Round of 16	Quarter-finals	Semi-finals	Final	
Team	Event	Opposition Score	Opposition Score	Rank	Opposition Score	Opposition Score	Opposition Score	Opposition Score	Rank
Akhyar Ahmed Khalid; Mohamed Khalaf Rafiu; Mohamed Shaffan Ismail; Moosa Munsif Ahmed	Men	Japan; L 0–3	Uzbekistan; L 0–3	3	Did not advance				
Aishath Alsaa Nafiz; Aishath Alsaa Nafiz; Fathimath Dheema Ali; Mishka Mohamed Ibrahim	Women	South Korea; L 0–3	Kazakhstan; L 1–3	3	Did not advance				

== Volleyball ==
=== Beach ===
Athletes	Event	Preliminary round				Round of 16	Quarterfinal	Semifinal	Final / BM	
Athletes	Event	Opposition Score	Opposition Score	Opposition Score	Rank	Opposition Score	Opposition Score	Opposition Score	Opposition Score	Rank
Naseem Adam; Sajid Ismail	Men's	Khakizadeh / Ghalehnovi (IRI); L 0–2 (12–21, 14–21)	Kurosawa / Mizumachi (JPN); L 0–2 (15–21, 11–21)	Shaikat / Ahmed (BAN); L 1–2 (21–13, 19–21, 15–17)	4	Did not advance				
Areesha Aminath; Anal Fathimath	Women's	Progella / Pagara (PHI); L 0–2 (6–21, 11–21)	To WT / To WM (HKG); L 0–2 (2–21, 9–21)	Gantogtokh / Batjargal (MGL); W 2–0 (21–14, 21–15)	3	Did not advance				
