= Adrià Alfonso =

Spanish sprinter (born 2002)

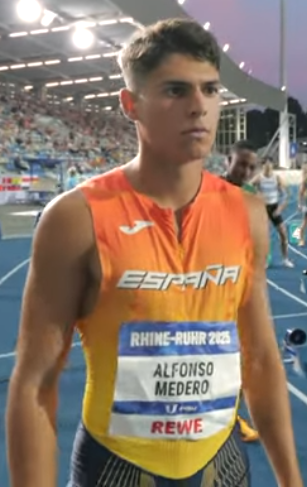
- At the 2025 Summer World University Games

Personal information
- Full name: Adrià Alfonso Medero
- Born: 11 July 2002 (age 23)

Sport
- Sport: Athletics
- Event: Sprint

Achievements and titles
- Personal bests: 200m: 20.55 (Oordegem, 2025); 400m: 48.65 (Cornella, 2024); Indoors; 200m: 20.65 (Madrid, 2025) NR
Medal record
Men's athletics
Representing Spain
Summer World University Games
Silver medal – second place	2025 Bochum	200 m

Adrià Alfonso Medero (born 11 July 2002) is a Spanish sprinter. In 2025, he became Spanish national record holder over 200 metres indoors. He was the silver medalist over 200 metres at the 2025 World University Games.

== Career ==
In February 2025, he became Spanish national record holder over 200 metres indoors running 20.65 seconds at the Spanish Indoor Championships in Madrid, where he won the title for a third consecutive year.

He competed at the 2025 World Athletics Relays in China in the Men's 4 × 100 metres relay in May 2025. He competed for Spain over 200 metres at the 2025 European Athletics Team Championships First Division in Madrid in June 2025. He was a silver medalist over 200 metres at the 2025 World University Games in Bochum, Germany, finishing runner-up to Bayanda Walaza of South Africa with 20.70 seconds.

== Personal life ==
He is from Barcelona in Catalonia.
