= Athletics at the 2022 Asian Games – Men's 100 metres =

Men's 100 metres at the 2022 Asian Games
- Venue: Hangzhou Olympic Expo Main Stadium
- Date: 29–30 September 2023
- Competitors: 42 from 25 nations

Medalists
gold medal	Xie Zhenye	China
silver medal	Puripol Boonson	Thailand
bronze medal	Muhd Azeem Fahmi	Malaysia

The men's 100 metres competition at the 2022 Asian Games took place on 29 and 30 September 2023 at the HOC Stadium, Hangzhou.

== Schedule ==
All times are China Standard Time (UTC+08:00)

Date	Time	Event
Friday, 29 September 2023	21:35	Round 1
Saturday, 30 September 2023	19:30	Semifinals
Saturday, 30 September 2023	21:55	Final

== Records ==
Prior to this competition, the existing world, Asian and Games records were as follows.

World Record	Usain Bolt (JAM)	9.58	Berlin, Germany	16 August 2009
Asian Record	Su Bingtian (CHN)	9.83	Tokyo, Japan	1 August 2021
Games Record	Su Bingtian (CHN)	9.92	Jakarta, Indonesia	26 August 2018

== Results ==
Legend

- DSQ — Disqualified

=== Round 1 ===
- Qualification: First 4 in each heat (Q) and the next 4 fastest (q) advance to the semifinals.

==== Heat 1 ====
- Wind: −0.2 m/s

Rank	Athlete	Time	Notes
1	Soraoat Dapbang (THA)	10.26	Q
2	Yoshihide Kiryu (JPN)	10.27	Q
3	Jo Kum-ryong (PRK)	10.28	Q
4	Yang Chun-han (TPE)	10.31	Q
5	Nasser Mahmoud Mohammed (KSA)	10.50	q
6	Shajar Abbas (PAK)	10.59	
7	Favoris Muzrapov (TJK)	10.67	
8	Sha Mahmood Noor Zahi (AFG)	10.85	
9	Ganboldyn Jantsandorj (MGL)	11.81	

==== Heat 2 ====
- Wind: −0.2 m/s

Rank	Athlete	Time	Notes
1	Yuki Koike (JPN)	10.27	Q
2	Chen Guanfeng (CHN)	10.36	Q
3	Lin Yu-sian (TPE)	10.43	Q
4	Gohar Shahbaz (PAK)	10.56	Q
5	Lee Hong Kit (HKG)	10.59	
6	Noureddine Hadid (LBN)	10.64	
7	Sorsy Phompakdy (LAO)	10.74	
8	Bu Cheng Hou (MAC)	10.94	

==== Heat 3 ====
- Wind: 0.0 m/s

Rank	Athlete	Time	Notes
1	Muhd Azeem Fahmi (MAS)	10.28	Q
2	Hassan Taftian (IRI)	10.42	Q
3	Ali Anwar Al-Balushi (OMA)	10.47	Q
4	Lee Jae-seong (KOR)	10.50	Q
5	Shak Kam Ching (HKG)	10.55	
6	Mark Lee (SGP)	10.68	
7	Mohamed Minhal Shamin (MDV)	10.82	
8	Pen Sokong (CAM)	10.93	

==== Heat 4 ====
- Wind: −0.2 m/s

Rank	Athlete	Time	Notes
1	Xie Zhenye (CHN)	10.07	Q
2	Puripol Boonson (THA)	10.13	Q
3	Saeed Al-Khaldi (BRN)	10.23	Q
4	Abdullah Abkar Mohammed (KSA)	10.30	Q
5	Marc Brian Louis (SGP)	10.38	q
6	Barakat Al-Harthi (OMA)	10.52	q
7	Chan Kin Wa (MAC)	10.64	
8	Ildar Akhmadiev (TJK)	10.73	
9	Noeb Chanyourong (CAM)	10.89	

==== Heat 5 ====
- Wind: −0.2 m/s

Rank	Athlete	Time	Notes
1	Lalu Muhammad Zohri (INA)	10.22	Q
2	Femi Ogunode (QAT)	10.24	Q
3	Imranur Rahman (BAN)	10.44	Q
4	Khairul Hafiz Jantan (MAS)	10.48	Q
5	Lee Si-mon (KOR)	10.51	q
6	Hassan Saaid (MDV)	10.71	
7	Otgontögsiin Zulkhüü (MGL)	10.92	
8	Xaidavanh Vongsavanh (LAO)	11.09	

=== Semifinals ===
- Qualification: First 2 in each heat (Q) and the next 2 fastest (q) advance to the final.

==== Heat 1 ====
- Wind: +2.0 m/s

Rank	Athlete	Time	Notes
1	Lalu Muhammad Zohri (INA)	10.12	Q
2	Muhd Azeem Fahmi (MAS)	10.17	Q
3	Saeed Al-Khaldi (BRN)	10.19	q
4	Yoshihide Kiryu (JPN)	10.23	
5	Yang Chun-han (TPE)	10.23	
6	Imranur Rahman (BAN)	10.42	
7	Gohar Shahbaz (PAK)	10.49	
8	Nasser Mahmoud Mohammed (KSA)	11.68	

==== Heat 2 ====
- Wind: +1.4 m/s

Rank	Athlete	Time	Notes
1	Xie Zhenye (CHN)	10.03	Q
2	Puripol Boonson (THA)	10.06	Q
3	Jo Kum-ryong (PRK)	10.33	
4	Lin Yu-sian (TPE)	10.35	
5	Femi Ogunode (QAT)	10.40	
6	Lee Jae-seong (KOR)	10.41	
7	Barakat Al-Harthi (OMA)	10.50	
8	Khairul Hafiz Jantan (MAS)	10.63	

==== Heat 3 ====
- Wind: +2.0 m/s

Rank	Athlete	Time	Notes
1	Hassan Taftian (IRI)	10.13	Q
2	Soraoat Dapbang (THA)	10.16	Q
3	Chen Guanfeng (CHN)	10.18	q
4	Abdullah Abkar Mohammed (KSA)	10.21	
5	Yuki Koike (JPN)	10.22	
6	Marc Brian Louis (SGP)	10.27	
7	Ali Anwar Al-Balushi (OMA)	10.33	
8	Lee Si-mon (KOR)	10.45	

=== Final ===
- Wind: +2.4 m/s

Rank	Athlete	Time	Notes
1st place, gold medalist(s)	Xie Zhenye (CHN)	9.97	
2nd place, silver medalist(s)	Puripol Boonson (THA)	10.02	
3rd place, bronze medalist(s)	Muhd Azeem Fahmi (MAS)	10.11	
4	Hassan Taftian (IRI)	10.14	
5	Saeed Al-Khaldi (BRN)	10.15	
6	Lalu Muhammad Zohri (INA)	10.16	
7	Chen Guanfeng (CHN)	10.34	
—	Soraoat Dapbang (THA)	DSQ	
