= Athletics at the 2025 Summer World University Games – Men's 4 × 100 metres relay =

Men's 4 × 100 metres relay at the 2025 Summer World University Games
- Venue: Lohrheidestadion
- Location: Bochum, Germany
- Dates: 26 July (heats); 27 July (final)
- Competitors: 57 from 14 nations
- Winning time: 38.50

Medalists
gold medal	Seo Min-jun; Nwamadi Joel-jin; Lee Jae-seong; Kim Jeong-yun	South Korea
silver medal	Kyle Zinn; Retshidisitswe Mlenga; Mthi Mthimkulu; Bayanda Walaza	South Africa
bronze medal	Lalu Bhoi; Animesh Kujur; Manikanta Hoblidhar; Dondapati Mrutyam Jayaram	India

The men's 4 × 100 metres relay event at the 2025 Summer World University Games was held in Bochum, Germany, at Lohrheidestadion on 26 and 27 July.

== Records ==
Prior to the competition, the records were as follows:

Record	Athlete (nation)	Time (s)	Location	Date
Games record	Italy (ITA)	38.42	Mexico City, Mexico	13 September 1979

== Results ==
=== Heats ===
First 3 in each heat (Q) and the next 2 fastest qualified for the final.

==== Heat 1 ====
Place	Nation	Athletes	Time	Notes
1	South Africa	Kyle Zinn, Retshidisitswe Mlenga, Mthi Mthimkulu, Bayanda Walaza	38.85	Q , SB
2	India	Lalu Bhoi, Animesh Kujur, Manikanta Hoblidhar, Dondapati Mrutyam Jayaram	39.21	Q, SB
3	Malaysia	Pengiran Aidil Auf Bin Hajam, Aliff Iman Bin Mohd Fahimi, Mohammad Thaqif Mohammad Hisham, Muhd Azeem Fahmi	39.83	Q, SB
4	Canada	Niko Dowhos, Travis Campbell, Jordan Soufi, Rui Ramsay	39.95	SB
5	United States	Chris Serrao, Joseph Gant, Jadon Spain, Trelee Banks	40.14	SB
	Colombia	Andres Ruiz Vasco, Juan Wilches, Luis Darío Sánchez, Jhoan Julio Hoyos	DQ	
	Hungary	Dominik Illovszky, Márk Pap, Zalán Deák, Ábel Takács	DQ	
	Uganda		DNS	

==== Heat 2 ====
Place	Nation	Athletes	Time	Notes
1	South Korea	Seo Min-jun, Nwamadi Joel-jin, Lee Jae-seong, Kim Jeong-yun	39.14	Q , SB
2	Australia	Joseph Ayoade, Connor Bond, Christopher Ius, Aidan Murphy	39.50	Q, SB
3	Germany	Felix Frühn, Fabian Olbert, Eddie Reddemann, Luka Herden	39.63	Q, SB
4	Poland	Olgierd Michniewski, Artur Łęczycki , Łukasz Żok, Adam Łukomski	39.65	q, SB
5	Thailand	Natawat Iamudom, Muhamah Salaeh, Thawatchai Himaiad, Soraoat Dapbang	39.83	q, SB
6	Zambia	Mulevu Musukuma, Peter Monga, Innocent Kanyala, Hope Zemba	43.51	SB
	Ecuador	Juan Apodaca, Santiago Llerena, Byron Preciado, Hector Soria	DQ	
	Chinese Taipei		DNS	

=== Final ===
Place	Nation	Athletes	Time	Notes
1st place, gold medalist(s)	South Korea	Seo Min-jun, Nwamadi Joel-jin, Lee Jae-seong, Kim Jeong-yun	38.50	SB
2nd place, silver medalist(s)	South Africa	Kyle Zinn, Retshidisitswe Mlenga, Mthi Mthimkulu, Bayanda Walaza	38.80	SB
3rd place, bronze medalist(s)	India	Lalu Bhoi, Animesh Kujur, Manikanta Hoblidhar, Dondapati Mrutyam Jayaram	38.89	SB
4	Australia	Joseph Ayoade, Connor Bond, Christopher Ius, Aidan Murphy	38.89	SB
5	Thailand	Natawat Iamudom, Muhamah Salaeh, Thawatchai Himaiad, Puripol Boonson	39.34	SB
6	Germany	Felix Frühn, Fabian Olbert, Eddie Reddemann, Luka Herden	39.46	SB
7	Poland	Olgierd Michniewski, Artur Łęczycki , Łukasz Żok, Adam Łukomski	39.81	
8	Malaysia	Pengiran Aidil Auf Bin Hajam, Aliff Iman Bin Mohd Fahimi, Mohammad Thaqif Mohammad Hisham, Muhd Azeem Fahmi	40.19	
