= Athletics at the 2025 Summer World University Games – Men's 100 metres =

Men's 100 metres at the 2025 Summer World University Games
- Venue: Lohrheidestadion
- Location: Bochum, Germany
- Dates: 21 July (heats); 22 July (semi-finals & final)
- Competitors: 55 from 43 nations
- Winning time: 10.16

Medalists
gold medal	Bayanda Walaza	South Africa
silver medal	Puripol Boonson	Thailand
bronze medal	Hiroki Yanagita	Japan

The men's 100 metres event at the 2025 Summer World University Games was held in Bochum, Germany, at Lohrheidestadion on 21 and 22 July.

== Records ==
Prior to the competition, the records were as follows:

Record	Athlete (nation)	Time (s)	Location	Date
Games record	Akani Simbine (RSA)	9.97	Gwangju, South Korea	9 July 2015

== Results ==
=== Heats ===
First 2 in each heat (Q) and the next 8 fastest (q) qualified for the semi-finals.

==== Heat 1 ====
Place	Athlete	Nation	Time	Notes
1	Riku Oishi	Japan	10.40	Q
2	Omar Ndoye	Senegal	10.58	Q
3	Maurice Grahl	Germany	10.61	q
4	Mateus Pereira	Brazil	10.68	q
5	Jakub Nemec	Slovakia	10.77	
6	Santiago Vial	Chile	11.03	
			Wind: (−1.3 m/s)	

==== Heat 2 ====
Place	Athlete	Nation	Time	Notes
1	Puripol Boonson	Thailand	10.23	Q
2	Eino Vuori	Finland	10.42	Q
3	Lin Yu-sian	Chinese Taipei	10.47	q, SB
4	King Wai Yip	Hong Kong	10.51	q
5	Daryl Tan	Singapore	10.78	
6	Hector Soria Paredes	Ecuador	11.48	
—	Daniel Magogo	Zimbabwe	DQ	TR 16.8
			Wind: (−0.2 m/s)	

==== Heat 3 ====
Place	Athlete	Nation	Time	Notes
1	Hiroki Yanagita	Japan	10.39	Q
2	Bori Akinola	Ireland	10.49	Q
3	Abdulaziz Al-Shahrani	Saudi Arabia	10.71	q, SB
4	Filip Federič	Slovakia	10.76	
5	Viktor Thor	Sweden	10.79	
6	Anže Verbovšek	Slovenia	10.88	
7	Magnus Johannsson	Hong Kong	10.90	
			Wind: (−0.7 m/s)	

==== Heat 4 ====
Place	Athlete	Nation	Time	Notes
1	Thawatchai Himaiad	Thailand	10.62	Q
2	Travis Campbell	Canada	10.63	Q
3	Artur Łęczycki	Poland	10.70	q
4	Wei Tai-sheng	Chinese Taipei	10.72	
5	Jadon Spain	United States	10.92	
6	Peter Monga	Zambia	10.98	
7	Sarzil Zedan	Bangladesh	12.10	
			Wind: (−0.4 m/s)	

==== Heat 5 ====
Place	Athlete	Nation	Time	Notes
1	Márk Pap	Hungary	10.74	Q
2	Joseph Ayoade	Australia	10.78	Q
3	Isaac Omurwa	Kenya	10.79	
4	Isaac Joseph	Haiti	10.89	
5	Aliff Iman Fahimi	Malaysia	11.09	
6	Chanyourong Noeb	Cambodia	11.11	
7	Luis Sanchez	Colombia	11.27	
			Wind: (−2.7 m/s)	

==== Heat 6 ====
Place	Athlete	Nation	Time	Notes
1	Bayanda Walaza	South Africa	10.27	Q
2	Connor Bond	Australia	10.36	Q
3	Dominik Illovszky	Hungary	10.38	q
4	Jeongyun Kim	South Korea	10.50	q
5	William Thor	Sweden	10.76	
6	Nadeem Ali	Pakistan	11.04	
7	Reimo Sepp	Estonia	11.10	
			Wind: (−0.3 m/s)	

==== Heat 7 ====
Place	Athlete	Nation	Time	Notes
1	Muhd Azeem Fahmi	Malaysia	10.57	Q
2	Joeljin Nwamadi	South Korea	10.61	Q
3	Niko Dowhos	Canada	10.72	
4	Gurindervir Singh	India	11.00	
5	Brandon Pemberton	Virgin Islands	11.03	
6	Issa Maiga	Mali	11.10	
7	Abraham Nevarez	Mexico	11.44	
			Wind: (−0.9 m/s)	

==== Heat 8 ====
Place	Athlete	Nation	Time	Notes
1	Kyle Zinn	South Africa	10.33	Q
2	Harry Taylor	Great Britain	10.66	Q
3	Manikanta Hoblidhar	India	10.74	
4	Emil Frænde	Denmark	10.79	
5	Precious Aina	Nigeria	11.17	
6	Julian Vila	Albania	11.21	
7	Dickson Silayo	Tanzania	12.05	
			Wind: (−0.3 m/s)	

=== Semi-finals ===
First 2 in each heat (Q) and the next 2 fastest (q) qualified for the final.

==== Heat 1 ====
Place	Athlete	Nation	Time	Notes
1	Hiroki Yanagita	Japan	10.25	Q
2	Kyle Zinn	South Africa	10.30	Q
3	Connor Bond	Australia	10.43	q
4	Travis Campbell	Canada	10.49	
5	Eino Vuori	Finland	10.59	
6	Harry Taylor	Great Britain	10.64	
7	Maurice Grahl	Germany	10.68	
8	Mateus Pereira	Brazil	10.79	
			Wind: (−0.7 m/s)	

==== Heat 2 ====
Place	Athlete	Nation	Time	Notes
1	Puripol Boonson	Thailand	10.24	Q
2	Riku Oishi	Japan	10.39	Q
3	Bori Akinola	Ireland	10.47	
4	Joeljin Nwamadi	South Korea	10.49	
5	Lin Yu-sian	Chinese Taipei	10.51	
6	Márk Pap	Hungary	10.59	
7	King Wai Yip	Hong Kong	10.73	
8	Artur Łęczycki	Poland	10.83	
			Wind: (−0.2 m/s)	

==== Heat 3 ====
Place	Athlete	Nation	Time	Notes
1	Bayanda Walaza	South Africa	10.31	Q
2	Dominik Illovszky	Hungary	10.32	Q
3	Muhd Azeem Fahmi	Malaysia	10.43	q
4	Jeongyun Kim	South Korea	10.50	
5	Omar Ndoye	Senegal	10.55	
6	Thawatchai Himaiad	Thailand	10.56	
7	Joseph Ayoade	Australia	10.63	
8	Abdulaziz Al-Shahrani	Saudi Arabia	10.85	
			Wind: (−0.8 m/s)	

=== Final ===
Place	Athlete	Nation	Time	Notes
1st place, gold medalist(s)	Bayanda Walaza	South Africa	10.16	
2nd place, silver medalist(s)	Puripol Boonson	Thailand	10.22	
3rd place, bronze medalist(s)	Hiroki Yanagita	Japan	10.23	
4	Muhd Azeem Fahmi	Malaysia	10.35	
5	Kyle Zinn	South Africa	10.42	
6	Riku Oishi	Japan	10.44	
7	Connor Bond	Australia	10.46	
8	Dominik Illovszky	Hungary	10.55	
			Wind: (−0.7 m/s)	
