= Xie Zhenye =

Chinese sprinter (born 1993)

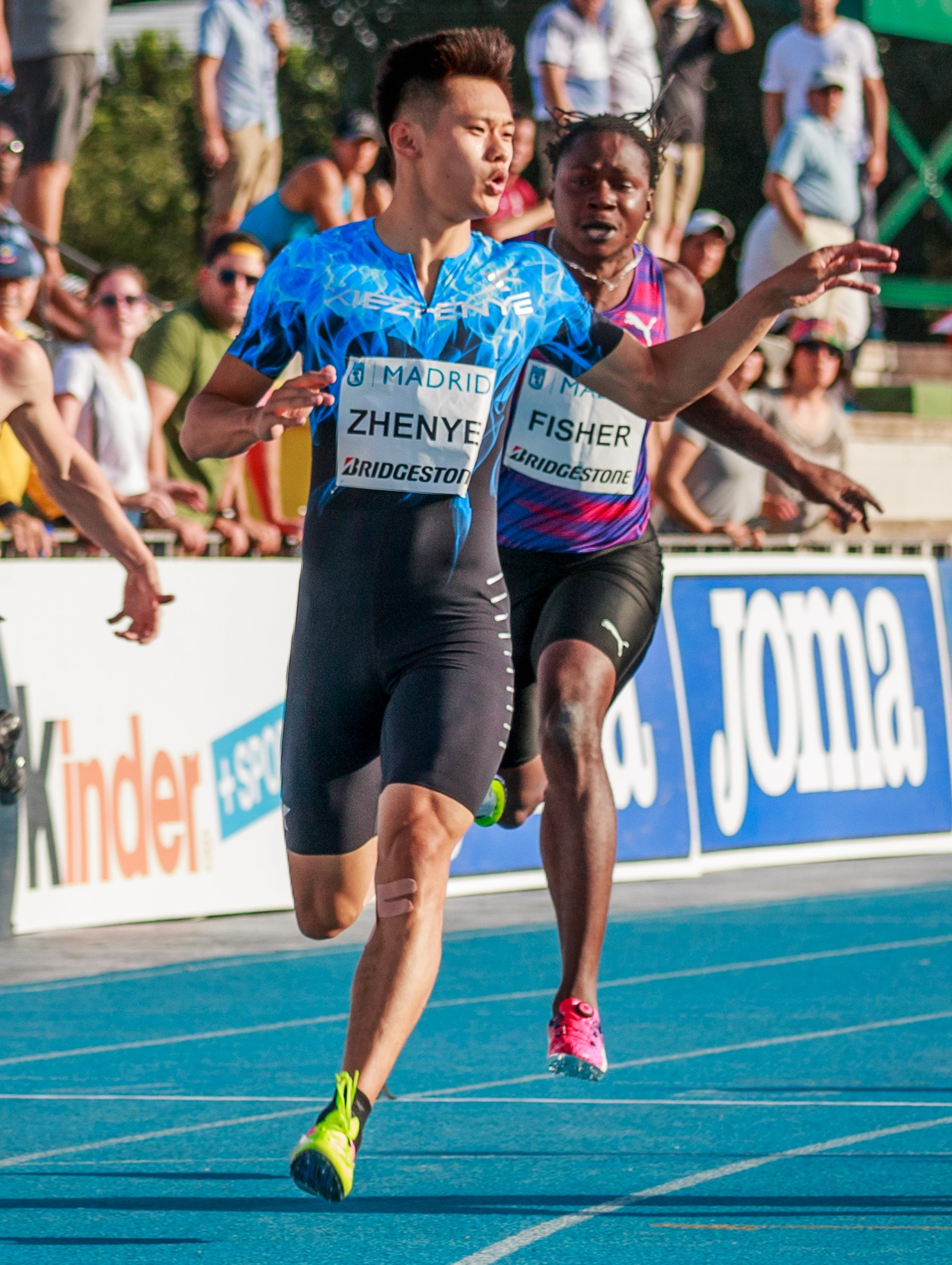
- Xie at the 2017 Meeting Madrid.

Personal information
- Born: August 17, 1993 (age 33) Keqiao District, Shaoxing, Zhejiang, China
- Height: 1.84 m (6 ft 0 in)
- Weight: 78 kg (172 lb)

Sport
- Country: China
- Sport: Athletics
- Events: 60 m, 100 m, 200 m, 4 × 100 m relay
- Coached by: Rana Reider

Achievements and titles
- Personal bests: 60 m: 6.52 (Birmingham 2018); 100 m: 9.97 (Montreuil 2018); 200 m: 19.88 AR NR (London 2019)
Medal record
Men's athletics
Representing China
Olympic Games
Bronze medal – third place	2020 Tokyo	4 × 100 m relay
World Championships
Silver medal – second place	2015 Beijing	4 × 100 m relay
World Cup
Gold medal – first place	2018 London	200 m
IAAF World Relays
Bronze medal – third place	2017 Nassau	4 × 100 m relay
Asian Games
Gold medal – first place	2014 Incheon	4 × 100 m relay
Gold medal – first place	2022 Hangzhou	100 m
Gold medal – first place	2022 Hangzhou	4 × 100 m relay
Gold medal – first place	2026 Aichi-Nagoya	4 × 100 m relay
Asian Championships
Gold medal – first place	2013 Pune	200 m
Gold medal – first place	2019 Doha	200 m
Silver medal – second place	2023 Bangkok	4 × 100 m relay
Bronze medal – third place	2013 Pune	4 × 100 m relay
Youth Olympic Games
Gold medal – first place	2010 Singapore	200 m
Asian U20 Championships
Gold medal – first place	2012 Colombo	200 m
Silver medal – second place	2012 Colombo	100 m

Xie Zhenye (Chinese: 谢震业; pinyin: Xiè Zhènyè, born August 17, 1993) is a Chinese sprinter. He is the current Asian record holder of the 200 metres with a time of 19.88 seconds. In 2018, Xie ran a personal best of 9.97 seconds in the 100 metres, making him the second Chinese sprinter to record a time below the 10-second barrier, after his compatriot Su Bingtian. Xie represented China at the 2012 Summer Olympics, 2016 Summer Olympics and 2020 Summer Olympics where he became the first Chinese athlete to have ever qualified for a semi-final of men's 200 metres at any Summer Olympic Games. In 2023, in the absence of his injured compatriot Su Bingtian, Xie became the 2022 Asian Games champion in the 100 metres event, with a time of 9.97 seconds.

== Career ==
=== Early career ===
Xie won the 200 metres gold medal at the 2010 Summer Youth Olympics. In 2011 he set a new 100 metres personal best of 10.36 seconds and a 200 m best of 20.79 seconds. He won the 200 m title at the Chinese City Games that year.

Xie took 100 metres silver and 200 metres gold at the 2012 Asian Junior Athletics Championships. He was also a finalist in both events at the 2012 World Junior Championships in Athletics. He was China's representative in the 200 m at the 2012 London Olympics but did not progress beyond the heats. He equalled the Chinese record for that event with a run of 20.54 seconds and closed his year with a win at the Chinese Athletics Championships. In his opening meeting of 2013 he ran a 60 metres best of 6.66 seconds and broke the Chinese indoor record in the 200 m, running 20.93 seconds.

=== 2022 Asian Games ===
In 2023, stepping up in the absence of fellow injured compatriot Su Bingtian, Xie competed in the 100 metres event in 2022 Asian Games in Hangzhou, and won the gold with a time of 9.97 seconds, and edging out Thai Puripol Boonson who took the silver, with a time of 10.02 second.

== Personal life ==
Xie was signed by Adidas as a brand ambassador in 2018. He is currently studying a master's degree at Zhejiang University in Hangzhou.

== Statistics ==
Information from IAAF profile unless otherwise noted.

=== Personal bests ===
Event	Time (s)	Wind (m/s)	Competition	Venue	Date	Notes
60 m	6.52	n/a	World Indoor Championships	Birmingham, England	3 March 2018	
100 m	9.97	+0.9	Meeting de Montreuil	Montreuil, France	19 June 2018	Former NR
100 m	9.91 w	+4.1	Pure Athletics Spring Invitational	Clermont, Florida, U.S.	14 April 2017	Wind-assisted
200 m	19.88	+0.9	London Grand Prix	London, United Kingdom	21 July 2019	AR, NR
4 × 100 m relay	37.79	n/a	Olympic Games	Tokyo, Japan	6 August 2021	NR

=== Sub-10 seconds 100 metres record ===
Time (s)	Wind (m/s)	Competition	Venue	Date	Notes
9.91 w	+4.1	Pure Athletics Spring Invitational	Clermont, Florida, U.S.	15 April 2017	Wind-assisted
9.93 w	+4.4	Meeting Madrid	Madrid, Spain	14 July 2017	Wind-assisted
9.97	+0.9	Meeting de Montreuil	Montreuil, France	19 June 2018	NR, PB

=== Circuit wins ===
==== 200 metres ====
- IAAF Diamond League
  - London: 2019

==== 4 × 100 metres relay ====
- IAAF Diamond League
  - Shanghai: 2016
  - Monaco: 2017

Records
Preceded by Femi Ogunode	Men's 200 m Asian record holder 21 July 2019 – present	Succeeded by Incumbent
