= Lee Jae-seong (sprinter) =

South Korean sprinter

Personal information
- Born: 18 June 2001 (age 25)

Sport
- Sport: Athletics
- Event: Sprint
Medal record
Men's athletics
Representing South Korea
Asian Games
| Bronze medal – third place | 2022 Hangzhou | 4 × 100 m relay |
Asian Championships
| Gold medal – first place | 2025 Gumi | 4 × 100 m relay |
Summer World University Games
| Gold medal – first place | 2025 Bochum | 4 × 100 m relay |
| Bronze medal – third place | 2025 Bochum | 200 m |

Lee Jae-seong (born 18 June 2001) is a South Korean sprinter.

== Career ==
He was a bronze medalist with the South Korean men’s 4 × 100 metres team at the delayed 2022 Asian Games held in Hangzhou, China in October 2023. It was the first time a South Korean team had won a medal in the event at the Games since 1986.

He was a gold medalist with the South Korean men’s 4 × 100 metres team at the 2025 Asian Athletics Championships in Gumi, South Korea. He competed at the 2025 World Athletics Relays in China in the Men's 4 × 100 metres relay in May 2025.

He was a bronze medalist over 200 metres at the 2025 World University Games in Bochum, Germany, finishing third behind Bayanda Walaza of South Africa and Adria Alfonso of Spain. He also won a gold medal in the men's 4 × 100 metres at the Games.

== Personal life ==
He had the honour of the ceremonial first ceremonial pitch for the Kia Tigers baseball team in Gwangju in 2025.
