= Animesh Kujur =

Indian sprinter (born 2003)

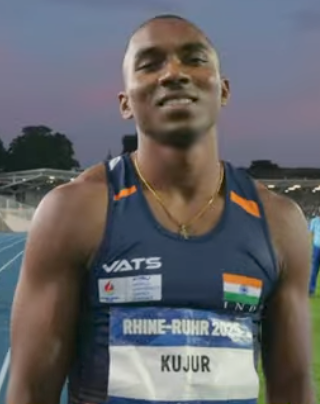
- Kujur at the 2025 World University Games

Personal information
- Born: 2 June 2003 (age 23) Ghuitangar, Chhattisgarh, India
- Height: 1.88 m (6 ft 2 in)

Sport
- Sport: Athletics
- Events: 100 m, 200 m

Achievements and titles
- Personal bests: 100 m: 10.14 (2026); 200 m: 20.32 NR (2025)
Medal record
Men's athletics
Representing India
Asian Games
Bronze medal – third place	2026 Aichi–Nagoya	4 × 100 m mixed
Asian Championships
Bronze medal – third place	2025 Gumi	200 m
Asian Relays
Bronze medal – third place	2026 Shaoxing	4 × 100 m mixed
World University Games
Bronze medal – third place	2025 Rhine-Ruhr	4 × 100 m
BRICS Games
Bronze medal – third place	2024 Kazan	200 m

Animesh Kujur (born 2 June 2003) is an Indian sprinter. At the 2025 Asian Championships, he set a national record in the 200 m event with a time of 20.32s, earning a bronze medal.

== Early life ==
Kujur was born to two police officer parents in Ghuitangar village in the Jashpur district of Chhattisgarh. His mother, a hockey player and his father, an athlete turned footballer, piqued his interest in sports. He attended Sainik School, Ambikapur and later the Kalinga Institute of Industrial Technology (KIIT). Kujur serves as a forest guard in the Forest Department, Government of Chhattisgarh, under sports quota since 2022.

== Career ==
In July 2025, at the Dromia International Sprint and Relays Meeting in Vari, Greece, Kujur became the first Indian to run the 100 m in under 10.2s, clocking a national record of 10.18s. In the same season, he became the first Indian sprinter to compete in a Diamond League event. He participated in the U23 200 m race at the Meeting Herculis EBS and finished fourth with an impressive timing of 20.55s.

At the 2025 Asian Championships, he set a new national record in the 200 m with a time of 20.32s, earning a bronze medal.

In August 2025, Kujur made history by becoming the first Indian male sprinter to qualify for the World Championships. He clocked 20.77s in the first round of the men's 200 m event at the 2025 World Championships, and did not advance to the semifinals.

At the 2026 World Relays, the mixed 4 × 100 m relay quartet failed to finish the race (DNF) as the baton slipped out of Kujur's hands after it was handed over to him by the second leg runner. The men's 4 × 100 m relay team of Harsh Santosh Raut, Ragul Kumar, Kujur and Gurindervir Singh finished at the eighth and last spot in the heats with a time of 39.07s.

In June 2026, he won a bronze medal as part of the 4 × 100 m mixed relay team at the Asian Relay Championships in Shaoxing, China.

In July 2026, Kujur ran a personal best of 10.14s in the 100 m at the Puma Fast Arms Fast Legs meeting held in Wetzlar, Germany.

== Awards ==
- Biju Patnaik Sports Award (2024), awarded by the Government of Odisha for outstanding performance.
