= Ibadulla Adam =

Maldivian athlete (born 2002)

Personal information
- Nationality: Maldivian
- Born: 14 January 2002 (age 24) Thinadhoo, Maldives

Sport
- Sport: Athletics
- Event: Sprint

Ibadulla Adam (born 14 January 2002) is a sprinter from the Maldives.

== Career ==
He began competing in athletics in 2015, whilst studying at GDh. Atoll Education Centre. The year, he won Best Athlete at the Interschool Athletics Championship. He held youth and junior national records in the 100 metres, becoming the first junior Maldivian to run under 11 seconds.

At the South Asian Junior Athletics Championship 2018, he won a bronze medal in the 4×100 relay. He competed at the 2018 Youth Olympic Games in Buenos Aires, and the Indian Ocean Games in 2019. He was selected to represent the Maldives at the 2019 Asian Athletics Championships in Doha. He was part of the Men's 4 × 400 metres relay team which placed fifth overall.

After recovering from injury that ruled him out of competition, he was awarded a universality place at the 2024 Paris Olympics. He was granted the honour of being a flag bearer for his country during the opening ceremony. He did not proceed past the preliminary round in the men’s 100 metres race in Paris.

== International Achievements ==
Year	Competition	Event	Result	Wins
2024	G. C. Foster Classic	100M	10.61	PB
2022	Islamic Solidarity Games	200M	21.75	PB
2019	South Asian Games	4×100	42.34	PB
2019	Asian Youth Athletics Championship	200M	22.97	PB
2019	Asian Youth Athletics Championship	100M	11.45	PB
2018	Youth Olympic Games Qualification	200M	24.08	PB
2018	South Asian Junior Athletics Championship	200M	24.69	PB
2018	South Asian Junior Athletics Championship	4×100	44.68	Bronze

== Awards ==
Year	Award	Competition
2015	Best Athlete	Interschool Athletics Championship
