= Gumi Civic Stadium =

Stadium in Gumi, South Korea

Coordinates: 36°6′41.03″N 128°21′7.97″E

Gumi Civic Stadium (Korean: 구미시민운동장 주경기장) is a multi-purpose stadium located in Gumi, North Gyeongsang, South Korea. It has a capacity of 35,000 and was built in 1984.
