= Bayanda Walaza =

South African athlete (born 2006)

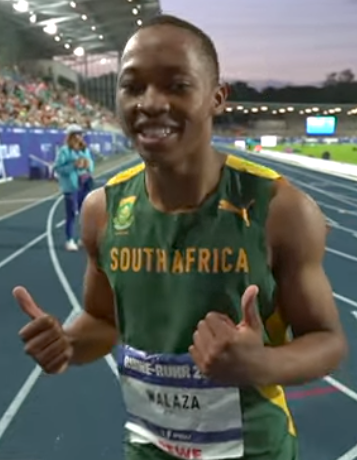
- At the 2025 Summer World University Games

Personal information
- Born: 9 February 2006 (age 20)

Sport
- Sport: Athletics
- Event: Sprint
- University team: Tshwane University of Technology

Achievements and titles
- Personal bests: 60 m: 6.58 (Pretoria 2025); 100 m: 9.89 (Banská Bystrica 2026); 200 m: 20.08 (Johannesburg 2025); 400 m: 46.61 (Pretoria 2025)
Medal record
Men's athletics
Representing South Africa
Summer Olympics
Silver medal – second place	2024 Paris	4×100 m relay
Summer World University Games
Gold medal – first place	2025 Bochum	100 m
Gold medal – first place	2025 Bochum	200 m
Silver medal – second place	2025 Bochum	4×100 m relay
World Relays
Gold medal – first place	2025 Guangzhou	4 × 100 m relay
World U20 Championships
Gold medal – first place	2024 Lima	100m
Gold medal – first place	2024 Lima	200m
African U18 Championships
Bronze medal – third place	2023 Ndola	100m

Bayanda Joy Walaza (born 9 February 2006) is a South African sprinter. He won silver at the 2024 Paris Olympics as part of South Africa's 4 x 100 metres relay team.

== Early life ==
From Katlehong in Gauteng, he attended Monde Primary School, Hoërskool Vorentoe and received a scholarship to Curro Hazeldean High School in Pretoria.

== Career ==
Walaza runs for Athletics Gauteng North. He won the SA U18 200m title in 21.10s and took silver in the 100m in 10.63s at the Athletics South Africa U18 Championships in Pietermaritzburg in January 2023. He won the bronze medal in the 100m at the African U18 Championships in 10.59s in April 2023 in Zambia.

He ran 10.36 seconds to win the U19 boys 100m race at the Curro Hazeldean Top 14 Athletics Meet which took place at the Pilditch Stadium, Pretoria on 28 January 2024. He won the South Africa U20 Championships over 100 and 200 metres in personal bests of 10.13 and 20.34 in March 2024. He was runner-up at the South African Championships over 100 metres in April 2024 in a time of 10.27 seconds.

He ran as part of the South African 4 × 100 m relay team which qualified for the 2024 Paris Olympics at the 2024 World Relays Championships in Nassau, Bahamas. In June 2024, he was selected for the South African team for the 2024 Paris Olympics.

On 9 August 2024, Walaza won an Olympic silver medal as part of South Africa's 4 x 100 metres relay team at the Paris Olympics while still only 18 years old, becoming the first South African to win an Olympic medal while still in high school. He won gold in both the 100 metres and 200 metres at the 2024 World Athletics U20 Championships in Lima, Peru in August 2024, running 10.19 and 20.52 respectably.

Walaza opened his season with a 46.61 personal best in the 400m in Pilditch Staduim, Pretoria on February 5. He would then win the AGN Provincial Championships in a massive personal best of 9.99 in the 100m on March 15 and run another personal best in the 200m in 20.08 at the ASA Grand Prix in Johanesburg on March 19. Walaza won the 100 metres at the South African U20 Championships in Cape Town at the end of March 2025 in 10.26, finishing ahead of Karabo Letebele. He ran 10.00 seconds for a second place finish behind Gift Leotlela at the 2025 senior South African Athletics Championships over 100 metres the following month. He competed at the 2025 World Athletics Relays in China in the Men's 4 × 100 metres relay in May 2025 and helped South Africa win the event. Later that month, he lowered his 100 metres personal best to 9.94 seconds whilst racing in Zagreb into a headwind of -0.3 m/s. He finished sixth in 10.04 seconds at the 2025 Prefontaine Classic on 5 July. That month, he won the sprint double over 100 metres and 200 metres at the 2025 Summer World University Games in Germany, as well as a silver medal in the men's 4 x 100 metres relay.

He suffered an injury running the 100 metres at the Diamond League Final in Zurich in August 2025. Despite this, he was selected for the South African team for the 2025 World Athletics Championships in Tokyo, Japan, although he late had to withdraw from the team due to the injury.

Walaza returned from his injury to compete in the European summer in 2026, setting a meeting record of 10.03 seconds at the Triveneto Meeting Internazionale in Italy, and placing fourth over 100 metres at the Paavo Nurmi Games in Finland on 3 June. On 16 June, he equalled his personal best to win the 100 metres in 9.94 seconds at the Golden Spike Ostrava. Walaza would lower his personal best again on July 21st, running 9.89s at Banska Bystrica

== Achievements ==
- Information from World Athletics profile unless otherwise noted.

=== Personal bests ===
Distance	Time (s)	Wind	Location	Date	Notes
60 metres	6.58	-1.8 m/s	Pretoria, South Africa	8 February 2025	
100 meters	9.89	+1.0 m/s	Banská Bystrica, Slovakia	21 July 2026	
200 meters	20.08	+0.5 m/s	Johannesburg, South Africa	19 March 2025	
400 meters	46.61	—N/a	Pretoria, South Africa	1 February 2025	

=== International competitions ===
Representing South Africa
Year	Competition	Venue	Position	Event	Time	Notes
2023	African U18 and U20 Championships in Athletics	Ndola, Zambia	3rd	100 m	10.59	
2024	Olympic Games	Paris, France	2nd	4 × 100 m relay	37.57	AR
2024	World U20 Championships	Lima, Peru	1st	100 m	10.19	
2024	World U20 Championships	Lima, Peru	1st	200 m	20.52	
2025	World Relays	Guangzhou, China	1st	4 × 100 m relay	37.61	
2025	World University Games	Bochum, Germany	1st	100 m	10.16	
2025	World University Games	Bochum, Germany	1st	200 m	20.63	
2025	World University Games	Bochum, Germany	2nd	4×100 m relay	38.80	

=== Circuit wins and titles ===
- World Athletics Continental Tour

- 2025: Hanžeković Memorial (100 m)
- 2026: Golden Spike Ostrava (100 m), TIPOS P-T-S Meeting (100m)
