= Paloma Mizuho Stadium (2026) =

Sports venue in Nagoya, Japan

- Interactive map of Paloma Mizuho Stadium
- Location: Nagoya, Aichi Prefecture, Japan
- Coordinates: 35°07′22″N 136°56′39″E
- Owner: Nagoya City
- Capacity: 30,000
- Surface: Grass
- Field size: 106 x 68 m
- Public transit: Nagoya Municipal Subway: Meijō Line at Mizuho Undōjō Higashi

Construction
- Groundbreaking: November 2021
- Built: 2021–2026
- Opened: 18 April 2026

Tenants
- 2026 Asian Games; Nagoya Grampus

The Paloma Mizuho Stadium (パロマ瑞穂スタジアム, Paroma Mizuho Sutajiamu) is a multi-purpose stadium in Nagoya, Aichi, Japan.

The stadium replaced the former stadium in the same ground, and was used for athletics and ceremonies for the 2026 Asian Games and 2026 Asian Para Games.

== History ==
The former stadium was used mostly for football matches and is the part-time home stadium of Nagoya Grampus along with Toyota Stadium. The former stadium holds 27,000 people and was built in 1941.

It is distinct from Mizuho Rugby Stadium, which has a capacity of 11,900 and is used mainly for rugby, including Top League games.

As mentioned above, the former stadium underwent major renovations and repairs in 1982 and 1994, but over 30 years have passed since then, and it has become noticeably dilapidated.

The stadium will host the athletics and the opening ceremony and closing ceremony of the 2026 Asian Games. It will also later host the athletics and the opening and closing ceremonies of the of 2026 Asian Para Games. During the Asian Games, temporary seating will be installed in a two-tiered, fully covered stand with a capacity of 35,000, and after the games, the capacity will be increased to 30,000.

According to a city council announcement on 25 December 2018, Nagoya aimed to begin renovation work in 2023 and complete it before the 2026 games, with funding to be raised through a broad-based crowdfunding method involving private funding. In response to this policy, Nagoya City and Nagoya Grampus Eight officially announced in November 2019 that Mizuho Stadium would be closed from fiscal year 2021 for a complete renovation, that Grampus-sponsored matches would not be held at Mizuho from that year until the renovation was completed, and that a reopening date for the stadium would be announced at a later date.

However, Nagoya City designated the stadium as a mass vaccination site during the COVID-19 pandemic, so the stadium was closed and construction work was delayed, and it continued to function as a vaccination site until the end of October 2021. After completing its role as a venue, the old stadium officially closed in November of the same year, and started demolished latter until 2022.

The new stadium was opened on 18 April 2026. The first football match in the stadium was held the following day, with the contested of Nagoya Grampus and Avispa Fukuoka in J1 100 Year Vision League, with the hosts won 5–4 on penalties after 2–2 draw.

== See also ==
- Japan National Stadium – a new stadium in Tokyo which was also built and replaced the former stadium to prepared for a big sports tournament like the Olympics and Paralympics games.

Preceded by Hangzhou Sports Park Stadium; Hangzhou	Asian Games; Opening and Closing Ceremonies; 2026	Succeeded by Khalifa International Stadium; Doha
Preceded by Hangzhou Sports Park Stadium; Hangzhou	Asian Games; Athletics competitions Main venue 2026	Succeeded by Khalifa International Stadium; Doha
Preceded by Hangzhou Sports Park Stadium; Hangzhou	Asian Para Games; Opening and Closing Ceremonies; 2026	Succeeded by Khalifa International Stadium; Doha
