= Athletics at the 2026 Commonwealth Games – Men's decathlon =

Men's decathlon at the 2026 Commonwealth Games
- Venue: Scotstoun Stadium
- Dates: 30 and 31 July 2026

Medalists
gold medal	Lindon Victor	Grenada
silver medal	Damian Warner	Canada
bronze medal	Tejaswin Shankar	India

The men's decathlon at the 2026 Commonwealth Games, as part of the athletics programme, took place in the Scotstoun Stadium on 30 and 31 July 2026.

== Records ==
Prior to this competition, the existing world and Games records were as follows:

Records - Decathlon
World record	9126 pts	Kevin Mayer (FRA)	Talence, France	16 September 2018
Commonwealth record	9018 pts	Damian Warner (CAN)	Tokyo Japan	5 August 2021
Games record	8663 pts	Daley Thompson (ENG)	Edinburgh, Scotland	28 July 1986

== Schedule ==
The schedule was as follows:

Date	Time	Round
30 July 2026	morning	100 metres
30 July 2026	morning	Long jump
30 July 2026	morning	Shot put
30 July 2026	evening	High jump
30 July 2026	evening	400 metres
31 July 2026	morning	110 metres hurdles
31 July 2026	morning	Discus throw
31 July 2026	morning	Pole vault
31 July 2026	evening	Javelin throw
31 July 2026	evening	1500 metres

All times are British Summer Time (UTC+1)

== Results ==
Competitors contested a series of 10 events over two days, with their results being converted into points. The final standings were decided by their cumulative points tallies.

=== 100 metres ===
Rank	Heat	Lane	Athlete	Time	Points	Notes
1	2	4	Damian Warner (CAN)	10.21	1044	
2	2	6	Lindon Victor (GRN)	10.54	966	
3	2	5	Sammy Ball (ENG)	10.56	961	
4	2	7	Jami Schlueter (NGR)	10.70	929	
5	1	3	Callum Newby (SCO)	10.76	915	
6	2	3	Joel McFarlane (SCO)	10.85	894	
7	2	2	Tejaswin Shankar (IND)	10.96	870	
8	1	7	Edwin Too (KEN)	11.03	854	
9	1	2	Max Attwell (NZL)	11.09	841	
10	1	5	Lewis Church (ENG)	11.14	830	
11	1	6	Max Teuruaa (COK)	11.18	821	
12	1	4	Evan Campbell (JEY)	11.32	791	

=== Long jump ===
Rank	Athlete	#1	#2	#3	Mark	Points	Notes	Overall
1	Tejaswin Shankar (IND)	7.42	7.82	-	7.82	1015	PB	1885
2	Damian Warner (CAN)	7.59	7.77	x	7.77	1002		2046
3	Sammy Ball (ENG)	7.13	7.27	7.49	7.49	932		1893
4	Callum Newby (SCO)	7.45	7.29	x	7.45	922		1837
5	Edwin Too (KEN)	x	7.39	x	7.39	908		1762
6	Lindon Victor (GRN)	x	7.20	7.20	7.20	862		1828
7	Jami Schlueter (NGR)	7.12	7.16	7.01	7.16	852		1781
8	Max Attwell (NZL)	6.78	6.91	7.15	7.15	850	SB	1691
9	Lewis Church (ENG)	7.02	7.10	7.10	7.10	838	=PB	1668
10	Joel McFarlane (SCO)	6.84	6.98	6.82	6.98	809		1703
11	Evan Campbell (JEY)	6.68	x	4.64	6.68	739		1530
12	Max Teuruaa (COK)	6.64	6.57	x	6.64	729		1550

=== Shot put ===
Rank	Athlete	#1	#2	#3	Mark	Points	Notes	Overall
1	Lindon Victor (GRN)	16.09	x	x	16.09	857	SB	2685
2	Jami Schlueter (NGR)	x	14.64	15.35	15.35	811		2592
3	Lewis Church (ENG)	14.14	14.56	14.22	14.56	763		2431
4	Evan Campbell (JEY)	14.43	14.33	14.33	14.43	755	SB	2285
5	Damian Warner (CAN)	13.59	13.35	13.84	13.84	719		2765
6	Sammy Ball (ENG)	13.69	13.72	13.73	13.73	712		2605
7	Tejaswin Shankar (IND)	13.01	12.70	13.09	13.09	673		2558
8	Joel McFarlane (SCO)	13.05	12.44	x	13.05	670		2373
9	Callum Newby (SCO)	13.04	12.45	12.95	13.04	670		2507
10	Max Attwell (NZL)	12.84	x	12.41	12.84	657	SB	2348
11	Max Teuruaa (COK)	8.72	10.95	11.31	11.31	565	PB	2115
12	Edwin Too (KEN)	9.91	8.50	x	9.91	480		2242

=== High jump ===
Rank	Athlete	1.67	1.70	1.73	1.76	1.79	1.82	1.85	1.88	1.91	1.94	1.97	2.00	2.03	2.06	2.09	2.12	2.15	2.18	2.21	Mark	Points	Notes	Overall
1	Tejaswin Shankar (IND)	–	–	–	–	–	–	–	–	–	–	–	o	–	o	–	x–	o	xx–	x	2.15	944		3502
2	Evan Campbell (JEY)	–	–	–	–	–	o	–	o	o	xo	o	o	xxx							2.00	803	SB	3088
3	Sammy Ball (ENG)	–	–	–	–	–	–	o	–	o	xo	o	xxx								1.97	776	=SB	3381
4	Damian Warner (CAN)	–	–	–	–	–	–	–	o	o	o	xxo	xxx								1.97	776		3541
5	Lewis Church (ENG)	–	–	–	–	–	–	o	xo	o	o	xxo	xxx								1.97	776		3207
6	Jami Schlueter (NGR)	–	–	–	–	–	–	o	–	xxo	o	xxo	xxx								1.97	776		3368
7	Edwin Too (KEN)	–	–	–	–	–	–	xo	o	o	xxx										1.91	723		2965
8	Callum Newby (SCO)	–	–	–	–	–	o	xxo	o	xxx											1.88	696		3203
9	Joel McFarlane (SCO)	–	–	–	–	o	o	o	xxo	xxx											1.88	696		3069
10	Max Attwell (NZL)	–	–	–	–	–	xo	o	xxo	xxx											1.88	696		3044
11	Lindon Victor (GRN)	–	–	–	–	–	o	–	xxx												1.82	644	SB	3329
12	Max Teuruaa (COK)	o	o	o	o	xxx															1.76	593		2708

=== 400 metres ===
Rank	Heat	Lane	Athlete	Time	Points	Notes	Total
1	2	2	Callum Newby (SCO)	48.59	881	PB	4084
2	1	6	Sammy Ball (ENG)	48.86	868	SB	4249
3	2	3	Joel McFarlane (SCO)	49.30	847		3916
4	2	6	Lindon Victor (GRN)	49.41	842	SB	4171
5	2	4	Tejaswin Shankar (IND)	49.51	837		4339
6	1	4	Jami Schlueter (NGR)	49.71	828		4196
7	2	5	Damian Warner (CAN)	50.05	812		4353
8	1	2	Max Attwell (NZL)	50.21	805		3849
9	2	7	Edwin Too (KEN)	51.19	761		3726
10	1	7	Lewis Church (ENG)	51.74	736		3943
11	1	5	Max Teuruaa (COK)	51.95	727		3435
12	1	3	Evan Campbell (JEY)	53.63	655		3743

=== 110 metres hurdles ===
Rank	Heat	Lane	Athlete	Time	Points	Notes	Total
1	2	6	Damian Warner (CAN)	14.04	969		5322
2	2	5	Tejaswin Shankar (IND)	14.41	922		5261
3	2	3	Lewis Church (ENG)	14.43	920		4863
4	2	2	Jami Schlueter (NGR)	14.56	903		5099
5	2	7	Sammy Ball (ENG)	14.61	897		5146
6	2	4	Callum Newby (SCO)	15.02	847		4931
7	1	4	Lindon Victor (GRN)	15.67	770	SB	4941
8	1	5	Edwin Too (KEN)	15.91	743		4469
9	1	7	Max Teuruaa (COK)	15.93	741		4176
10	1	6	Joel McFarlane (SCO)	15.96	737		4653
11	1	2	Max Attwell (NZL)	16.19	711		4560
–	1	3	Evan Campbell (JEY)	DQ	0		3743

=== Discus throw ===
Rank	Athlete	#1	#2	#3	Mark	Points	Notes	Overall
1	Lindon Victor (GRN)	x	50.33	53.52	53.52	944	GDB	5885
2	Lewis Church (ENG)	33.01	43.77	30.45	43.77	742	SB	5605
3	Sammy Ball (ENG)	42.43	42.01	42.07	42.43	714		5860
4	Callum Newby (SCO)	x	42.16	33.98	42.16	709	PB	5640
5	Evan Campbell (JEY)	40.04	41.31	41.26	41.31	691	SB	4434
6	Tejaswin Shankar (IND)	37.20	39.66	40.44	40.44	674	PB	5935
7	Joel McFarlane (SCO)	x	x	39.86	39.86	662		5315
8	Max Attwell (NZL)	35.54	39.47	38.87	39.47	654		5214
9	Damian Warner (CAN)	37.61	37.40	x	37.61	616		5938
10	Jami Schlueter (NGR)	33.81	36.86	36.92	36.92	602		5701
11	Edwin Too (KEN)	36.39	36.91	36.02	36.91	602	SB	5071
12	Max Teuruaa (COK)	30.02	x	26.07	30.02	465		4641

=== Pole vault ===
Rank	Athlete	3.60	3.70	3.80	3.90	4.00	4.10	4.20	4.30	4.40	4.50	4.60	4.70	4.80	4.90	5.00	5.10	Mark	Points	Notes	Overall
1	Callum Newby (SCO)												o	-	o	xo	xxx	5.00	910		6550
2	Lewis Church (ENG)								o	o	xo	xxo	o	xxx				4.70	819	SB	6424
3	Lindon Victor (GRN)						o	xo	xo	o	xo	xo	xo	xxx				4.70	819	SB	6704
4	Jami Schlueter (NGR)									o	xo	o	xxx					4.60	790		6491
5	Sammy Ball (ENG)							o	-	xo	o	xo	xxx					4.60	790		6650
6	Max Attwell (NZL)										xo	-	xxx					4.50	760		5974
7	Damian Warner (CAN)						o	-	o	o	xxx							4.40	731		6669
8	Tejaswin Shankar (IND)						o	o	o	xxx								4.30	702		6637
9	Joel McFarlane (SCO)				o	-	xxo	xo	o	xxx								4.30	702		6017
10	Evan Campbell (JEY)					xo	o	xxx										4.10	645		5079
11	Max Teuruaa (COK)	o	xxo	o	xxo	xxo	xxx											4.00	617	=NR	5258
12	Edwin Too (KEN)	o	-	xxx														3.70	509		5580

=== Javelin throw ===
Rank	Athlete	#1	#2	#3	Mark	Points	Notes	Overall
1	Lindon Victor (GRN)	x	57.45	63.06	63.06	784	SB	7488
2	Lewis Church (ENG)	55.82	54.18	56.21	56.21	681		7105
3	Damian Warner (CAN)	55.54	51.23	52.75	55.54	671	SB	7340
4	Tejaswin Shankar (IND)	x	53.12	x	53.12	635	SB	7163
5	Joel McFarlane (SCO)	47.01	50.00	53.11	53.11	635		7105
6	Evan Campbell (JEY)	45.43	51.19	52.21	52.21	621	SB	7030
7	Max Teuruaa (COK)	49.81	x	45.80	49.81	586		6994
8	Max Attwell (NZL)	46.99	46.50	44.97	46.99	544		6652
9	Sammy Ball (ENG)	44.09	44.88	40.95	44.88	513		6518
10	Jami Schlueter (NGR)	x	44.16	42.67	44.16	503		6071
11	Edwin Too (KEN)	43.36	x	x	43.36	491		5844
12	Callum Newby (SCO)	x	42.61	39.90	42.61	480		5700

=== 1500 metres ===
Rank	Athlete	Time	Points	Notes	Overall
1	Max Attwell (NZL)	4:28.50	754	SB	7272
2	Lewis Church (ENG)	4:30.58	741		7846
3	Sammy Ball (ENG)	4:32.29	730		7893
4	Joel McFarlane (SCO)	4:34.03	718	SB	7370
5	Tejaswin Shankar (IND)	4:36.19	704		7976
6	Damian Warner (CAN)	4:37.50	696		8036
7	Callum Newby (SCO)	4:38.00	693	PB	7723
8	Jami Schlueter (NGR)	4:41.54	671		7665
9	Evan Campbell (JEY)	4:46.67	639	SB	6339
10	Edwin Too (KEN)	4:50.53	615		6686
11	Lindon Victor (GRN)	4:51.78	608	SB	8096
12	Max Teuruaa (COK)	4:54.83	590		6434

== Final standings ==
Rank	Athlete	Event points										Total points	Notes
Rank	Athlete	100m	LJ	SP	HJ	400m	110m h	DT	PV	JT	1500m	Total points	Notes
1st place, gold medalist(s)	Lindon Victor (GRN)	966 10.54	862 7.20	857 16.09	644 1.82	842 49.41	770 15.67	944 53.52	819 4.70	784 63.06	608 4:51.78	8096	SB
2nd place, silver medalist(s)	Damian Warner (CAN)	1044 10.21	1002 7.77	719 13.84	776 1.97	812 50.05	969 14.04	616 37.61	731 4.40	671 55.54	696 4:37.50	8036	
3rd place, bronze medalist(s)	Tejaswin Shankar (IND)	870 10.96	1015 7.82	673 13.09	944 2.15	837 49.51	922 14.41	674 40.44	702 4.30	635 53.12	704 4:36.19	7976	
4	Sammy Ball (ENG)	961 10.56	932 7.49	712 13.73	776 1.97	868 48.86	897 14.61	714 42.43	790 4.60	513 44.88	730 4:32.29	7893	SB
5	Lewis Church (ENG)	830 11.14	838 7.10	763 14.56	776 1.97	736 51.74	920 14.43	742 43.77	819 4.70	681 56.21	741 4:30.58	7846	SB
6	Callum Newby (SCO)	915 10.76	922 7.45	670 13.04	696 1.88	881 48.59	847 15.02	709 42.16	910 5.00	480 42.61	693 4:38.00	7723	
7	Jami Schlueter (NGR)	929 10.70	852 7.16	811 15.35	776 1.97	828 49.71	903 14.56	602 36.92	790 4.60	503 44.16	671 4:41.54	7665	
8	Joel McFarlane (SCO)	894 10.85	809 6.98	670 13.05	696 1.88	847 49.30	737 15.96	662 39.86	702 4.30	635 53.11	718 4:34.03	7370	
9	Max Attwell (NZL)	841 11.09	850 7.15	657 12.84	696 1.88	805 50.21	711 16.19	654 39.47	760 4.50	544 46.99	754 4:28.50	7272	SB
10	Edwin Too (KEN)	854 11.03	908 7.39	480 9.91	723 1.91	761 51.19	743 15.91	602 36.91	509 3.60	491 43.36	615 4:50.53	6686	
11	Max Teuruaa (COK)	821 11.18	729 6.64	565 11.31	593 1.76	727 51.95	741 15.93	465 30.02	617 4.00	586 49.81	590 4:54.83	6434	NR
12	Evan Campbell (JEY)	791 11.32	739 6.68	755 14.43	803 2.00	655 53.63	0 DQ	691 41.31	645 4.10	621 52.21	639 4:46.67	6339	
