= Athletics at the 2026 Asian Games – Men's decathlon =

Men's decathlon at the 2026 Asian Games
- Venue: Nagoya City Mizuho Park Athletics Stadium
- Date: 26–27 September 2026
- Competitors: 14 from 8 nations
- Winning score: 8123 pts

Medalists
| gold medal | Yuma Maruyama | Japan |
| silver medal | Chen Xinghua | China |
| bronze medal | Tejaswin Shankar | India |

The men's decathlon competition at the 2026 Asian Games took place on 26 and 27 September 2026 at the Nagoya City Mizuho Park Athletics Stadium, Nagoya, Japan.

Japan's Yuma Maruyama won the gold medal with 8,123 points, upgrading the bronze medal he had won at the previous Games. China's Chen Xinghua took silver with 8,012 points and India's Tejaswin Shankar claimed bronze with 7,934 points.

== Schedule ==
All times are Japan Standard Time (UTC+09:00)

| Date | Time | Event |
|---|---|---|
| Saturday, 26 September 2026 | 09:05 | 100 metres |
| Saturday, 26 September 2026 | 09:45 | Long jump |
| Saturday, 26 September 2026 | 11:25 | Shot put |
| Saturday, 26 September 2026 | 18:05 | High jump |
| Saturday, 26 September 2026 | 21:20 | 400 metres |
| Sunday, 27 September 2026 | 11:00 | 110 metres hurdles |
| Sunday, 27 September 2026 | 11:40 | Discus throw |
| Sunday, 27 September 2026 | 13:20 | Pole vault |
| Sunday, 27 September 2026 | 19:05 | Javelin throw |
| Sunday, 27 September 2026 | 21:10 | 1500 metres |

== Records ==
Prior to this competition, the existing world, Asian and Games records were as follows.

| World Record | Kevin Mayer (FRA) | 9126 | Talence, France | 16 September 2018 |
| Asian Record | Dmitriy Karpov (KAZ) | 8725 | Athens, Greece | 24 August 2004 |
| Games Record | Dmitriy Karpov (KAZ) | 8384 | Doha, Qatar | 11 December 2006 |

== Results ==
Legend

- DNF — Did not finish
- DNS — Did not start
- PB — Personal best
- SB — Season best

=== 100 metres ===
- Wind: Heat 1: −1.0 m/s, Heat 2: +0.3 m/s

| Rank | Athlete | Time | Points | Notes |
|---|---|---|---|---|
| 1 | Keisuke Okuda (JPN) | 10.67 | 935 | |
| 2 | Chen Xinghua (CHN) | 10.72 | 924 | |
| 3 | Yuma Maruyama (JPN) | 10.75 | 917 | |
| 4 | Lee Yu-seong (KOR) | 10.81 | 903 | |
| 5 | Tejaswin Shankar (IND) | 10.98 | 865 | |
| 6 | Ali Hassan Beedh (KSA) | 11.01 | 858 | |
| 7 | Thowfeeq Noushad (IND) | 11.02 | 856 | |
| 8 | Nodir Norbaev (UZB) | 11.13 | 832 | |
| 9 | Wang Chen-yu (TPE) | 11.15 | 827 | |
| 10 | Cho Chia-hsuan (TPE) | 11.29 | 797 | |
| 11 | Park Jun-young (KOR) | 11.38 | 778 | |
| 12 | Zakhiriddin Shokirov (UZB) | 11.41 | 771 | |
| — | Haroun Ahmat (QAT) | DNS | | |
| — | Elbraa Hassan (QAT) | DNS | | |

=== Long jump ===
| Rank | Athlete | Attempt | | | Result | Points | Notes |
| Rank | Athlete | 1 | 2 | 3 | Result | Points | Notes |
|---|---|---|---|---|---|---|---|
| 1 | Tejaswin Shankar (IND) | 7.39 +0.4 | 7.53 +0.6 | X −0.2 | 7.53 | 942 | |
| 2 | Chen Xinghua (CHN) | 7.43 −0.4 | 7.40 +0.3 | 7.29 +0.6 | 7.43 | 918 | |
| 3 | Thowfeeq Noushad (IND) | X +0.1 | 6.60 +0.6 | 7.37 +0.4 | 7.37 | 903 | |
| 4 | Zakhiriddin Shokirov (UZB) | 7.12 +0.9 | 7.35 +1.0 | X +0.3 | 7.35 | 898 | |
| =5 | Keisuke Okuda (JPN) | 7.12 +0.7 | X −0.2 | – | 7.12 | 842 | |
| =5 | Yuma Maruyama (JPN) | X +0.9 | 7.12 +1.0 | X +0.1 | 7.12 | 842 | |
| 7 | Wang Chen-yu (TPE) | 6.60 −0.1 | 6.83 +1.2 | 7.10 −0.8 | 7.10 | 838 | |
| 8 | Nodir Norbaev (UZB) | 7.04 +0.6 | X +0.2 | 6.94 −0.1 | 7.04 | 823 | |
| 9 | Ali Hassan Beedh (KSA) | 6.91 +0.1 | X +0.2 | – | 6.91 | 792 | |
| 10 | Cho Chia-hsuan (TPE) | 6.84 +0.7 | 6.80 −1.4 | X −0.1 | 6.84 | 776 | |
| 11 | Lee Yu-seong (KOR) | 6.71 +0.3 | X +0.0 | X +0.0 | 6.71 | 746 | |
| 12 | Park Jun-young (KOR) | 6.39 +0.1 | X +0.2 | 6.64 +0.0 | 6.64 | 729 | |

=== Shot put ===
| Rank | Athlete | Attempt | | | Result | Points | Notes |
| Rank | Athlete | 1 | 2 | 3 | Result | Points | Notes |
|---|---|---|---|---|---|---|---|
| 1 | Yuma Maruyama (JPN) | 13.43 | 14.03 | X | 14.03 | 730 | |
| 2 | Wang Chen-yu (TPE) | 12.55 | 13.11 | 13.56 | 13.56 | 701 | |
| 3 | Chen Xinghua (CHN) | 11.82 | 12.06 | 13.25 | 13.25 | 682 | |
| 4 | Ali Hassan Beedh (KSA) | 13.04 | 13.21 | 13.00 | 13.21 | 680 | |
| 5 | Tejaswin Shankar (IND) | 13.16 | 12.43 | 12.88 | 13.16 | 677 | |
| 6 | Keisuke Okuda (JPN) | 10.74 | 13.09 | 12.60 | 13.09 | 673 | |
| 7 | Nodir Norbaev (UZB) | 12.04 | 12.34 | 13.05 | 13.05 | 670 | |
| 8 | Cho Chia-hsuan (TPE) | 12.01 | 12.90 | 12.57 | 12.90 | 661 | |
| 9 | Zakhiriddin Shokirov (UZB) | 12.26 | 12.65 | 12.42 | 12.65 | 646 | |
| 10 | Park Jun-young (KOR) | 11.78 | X | 11.67 | 11.78 | 593 | |
| 11 | Lee Yu-seong (KOR) | 10.38 | 11.00 | X | 11.00 | 546 | |
| 12 | Thowfeeq Noushad (IND) | X | 10.13 | 10.76 | 10.76 | 531 | |

=== High jump ===
| Rank | Athlete | Attempt | | | | | | | Result | Points | Notes |
| Rank | Athlete | 1.70 | 1.73 | 1.76 | 1.79 | 1.82 | 1.85 | 1.88 | Result | Points | Notes |
| Rank | Athlete | 1.91 | 1.94 | 1.97 | 2.00 | 2.03 | 2.06 | 2.09 | Result | Points | Notes |
| Rank | Athlete | 2.12 | 2.15 | 2.18 | 2.21 | 2.24 | 2.27 | | Result | Points | Notes |
|---|---|---|---|---|---|---|---|---|---|---|---|
| 1 | Tejaswin Shankar (IND) | – | – | – | – | – | – | – | 2.18 | 973 | |
| 1 | Tejaswin Shankar (IND) | – | – | – | O | – | O | – | 2.18 | 973 | |
| 1 | Tejaswin Shankar (IND) | O | O | XO | XXX | | | | 2.18 | 973 | |
| 2 | Nodir Norbaev (UZB) | – | – | – | – | – | – | – | 2.03 | 831 | |
| 2 | Nodir Norbaev (UZB) | O | – | XO | O | XXO | XXX | | 2.03 | 831 | |
| 3 | Yuma Maruyama (JPN) | – | – | – | – | – | O | – | 2.00 | 803 | |
| 3 | Yuma Maruyama (JPN) | O | XO | XXO | XO | XXX | | | 2.00 | 803 | |
| 4 | Zakhiriddin Shokirov (UZB) | – | – | – | – | – | O | – | 1.97 | 776 | |
| 4 | Zakhiriddin Shokirov (UZB) | O | O | XXO | XXX | | | | 1.97 | 776 | |
| 5 | Chen Xinghua (CHN) | – | – | – | O | – | – | O | 1.94 | 749 | |
| 5 | Chen Xinghua (CHN) | XO | O | XXX | | | | | 1.94 | 749 | |
| 6 | Cho Chia-hsuan (TPE) | O | – | – | O | – | XXO | XO | 1.88 | 696 | |
| 6 | Cho Chia-hsuan (TPE) | XXX | | | | | | | 1.88 | 696 | |
| 7 | Wang Chen-yu (TPE) | – | – | O | O | O | O | XXO | 1.88 | 696 | |
| 7 | Wang Chen-yu (TPE) | XXX | | | | | | | 1.88 | 696 | |
| 8 | Thowfeeq Noushad (IND) | – | – | – | O | XO | XXO | XXO | 1.88 | 696 | |
| 8 | Thowfeeq Noushad (IND) | XXX | | | | | | | 1.88 | 696 | |
| 9 | Park Jun-young (KOR) | – | – | XO | XO | XO | O | XXX | 1.85 | 670 | |
| 10 | Keisuke Okuda (JPN) | XO | O | XO | O | XXX | | | 1.79 | 619 | |
| 11 | Lee Yu-seong (KOR) | – | – | XO | XXX | | | | 1.76 | 593 | |
| — | Ali Hassan Beedh (KSA) | DNS | | | | | | | | | |

=== 400 metres ===
| Rank | Athlete | Time | Points | Notes |
|---|---|---|---|---|
| 1 | Chen Xinghua (CHN) | 46.63 | 977 | |
| 2 | Yuma Maruyama (JPN) | 48.28 | 896 | |
| 3 | Tejaswin Shankar (IND) | 48.59 | 881 | |
| 4 | Lee Yu-seong (KOR) | 49.17 | 853 | |
| 5 | Keisuke Okuda (JPN) | 49.38 | 843 | |
| 6 | Nodir Norbaev (UZB) | 50.34 | 799 | |
| 7 | Wang Chen-yu (TPE) | 51.10 | 765 | |
| 8 | Cho Chia-hsuan (TPE) | 51.79 | 734 | |
| 9 | Park Jun-young (KOR) | 51.80 | 734 | |
| 10 | Zakhiriddin Shokirov (UZB) | 51.97 | 726 | |
| 11 | Thowfeeq Noushad (IND) | 52.81 | 690 | |
| — | Ali Hassan Beedh (KSA) | DNS | | |

=== 110 metres hurdles ===
- Wind: Heat 1: +0.3 m/s, Heat 2: −0.3 m/s

| Rank | Athlete | Time | Points | Notes |
|---|---|---|---|---|
| 1 | Yuma Maruyama (JPN) | 14.00 | 975 | |
| 2 | Chen Xinghua (CHN) | 14.01 | 973 | |
| 3 | Tejaswin Shankar (IND) | 14.33 | 932 | |
| 4 | Keisuke Okuda (JPN) | 14.47 | 915 | |
| 5 | Wang Chen-yu (TPE) | 14.53 | 907 | |
| 6 | Nodir Norbaev (UZB) | 14.60 | 899 | F1 |
| 7 | Zakhiriddin Shokirov (UZB) | 15.04 | 845 | YC |
| 8 | Cho Chia-hsuan (TPE) | 15.10 | 837 | |
| 9 | Lee Yu-seong (KOR) | 15.54 | 785 | |
| 10 | Park Jun-young (KOR) | 15.78 | 758 | |
| — | Thowfeeq Noushad (IND) | DNS | | |

=== Discus throw ===
| Rank | Athlete | Attempt | | | Result | Points | Notes |
| Rank | Athlete | 1 | 2 | 3 | Result | Points | Notes |
|---|---|---|---|---|---|---|---|
| 1 | Yuma Maruyama (JPN) | 33.28 | 43.05 | 44.21 | 44.21 | 751 | |
| 2 | Keisuke Okuda (JPN) | 37.92 | 37.15 | 43.91 | 43.91 | 744 | |
| 3 | Zakhiriddin Shokirov (UZB) | 41.98 | 41.04 | 41.49 | 41.98 | 705 | YC |
| 4 | Nodir Norbaev (UZB) | 41.85 | X | 38.79 | 41.85 | 702 | |
| 5 | Chen Xinghua (CHN) | 41.11 | 41.54 | X | 41.54 | 696 | |
| 6 | Wang Chen-yu (TPE) | 40.57 | 39.30 | 41.32 | 41.32 | 691 | |
| 7 | Tejaswin Shankar (IND) | 36.77 | X | 36.48 | 36.77 | 599 | |
| 8 | Cho Chia-hsuan (TPE) | 34.84 | 34.15 | X | 34.84 | 560 | |
| 9 | Park Jun-young (KOR) | X | 28.27 | 34.11 | 34.11 | 546 | |
| 10 | Lee Yu-seong (KOR) | 28.12 | 30.82 | X | 30.82 | 481 | |
| — | Thowfeeq Noushad (IND) | NM | | | | 0 | |

=== Pole vault ===
Group A

| Rank | Athlete | Attempt | | | | | | | | | | | | Result | Points | Notes |
| Rank | Athlete | 3.70 | 3.80 | 3.90 | 4.00 | 4.10 | 4.20 | 4.30 | 4.40 | 4.50 | 4.60 | 4.70 | 4.80 | Result | Points | Notes |
|---|---|---|---|---|---|---|---|---|---|---|---|---|---|---|---|---|
| 1 | Zakhiriddin Shokirov (UZB) | – | – | – | – | – | O | – | O | O | O | O | XXX | 4.70 | 819 | SB |
| 2 | Keisuke Okuda (JPN) | – | – | – | – | – | – | O | O | O | XXR | | | 4.50 | 760 | SB |
| 3 | Lee Yu-seong (KOR) | – | – | – | XO | – | O | – | XO | XO | XXX | | | 4.50 | 760 | |
| 4 | Tejaswin Shankar (IND) | – | – | – | – | O | XO | XXO | XXX | | | | | 4.30 | 702 | |
| 5 | Cho Chia-hsuan (TPE) | – | – | – | O | – | O | – | XXX | | | | | 4.20 | 673 | |

Group B

| Rank | Athlete | Attempt | | | | | | | Result | Points | Notes |
| Rank | Athlete | 3.70 | 3.80 | 3.90 | 4.00 | 4.10 | 4.20 | 4.30 | Result | Points | Notes |
| Rank | Athlete | 4.40 | 4.50 | 4.60 | 4.70 | 4.80 | 4.90 | 5.00 | Result | Points | Notes |
| Rank | Athlete | 5.10 | 5.20 | | | | | | Result | Points | Notes |
|---|---|---|---|---|---|---|---|---|---|---|---|
| 1 | Yuma Maruyama (JPN) | – | – | – | – | – | – | – | 5.10 | 941 | SB |
| 1 | Yuma Maruyama (JPN) | – | – | O | – | XO | O | O | 5.10 | 941 | SB |
| 1 | Yuma Maruyama (JPN) | O | XXX | | | | | | 5.10 | 941 | SB |
| 2 | Nodir Norbaev (UZB) | – | – | – | – | – | O | – | 4.60 | 790 | |
| 2 | Nodir Norbaev (UZB) | O | O | O | XXX | | | | 4.60 | 790 | |
| =2 | Chen Xinghua (CHN) | – | – | – | – | – | O | – | 4.60 | 790 | |
| =2 | Chen Xinghua (CHN) | O | – | O | – | XXX | | | 4.60 | 790 | |
| 4 | Wang Chen-yu (TPE) | – | – | – | – | – | O | – | 4.50 | 760 | |
| 4 | Wang Chen-yu (TPE) | O | O | XXX | | | | | 4.50 | 760 | |
| 5 | Park Jun-young (KOR) | – | – | – | O | – | XXX | | 4.00 | 617 | |

=== Javelin throw ===
| Rank | Athlete | Attempt | | | Result | Points | Notes |
| Rank | Athlete | 1 | 2 | 3 | Result | Points | Notes |
|---|---|---|---|---|---|---|---|
| 1 | Nodir Norbaev (UZB) | 58.70 | 58.94 | 62.12 | 62.12 | 770 | |
| 2 | Cho Chia-hsuan (TPE) | 59.90 | 61.94 | 59.72 | 61.94 | 767 | |
| 3 | Wang Chen-yu (TPE) | 59.81 | 58.99 | X | 59.81 | 735 | |
| 4 | Park Jun-young (KOR) | 54.17 | 52.14 | X | 54.17 | 651 | |
| 5 | Tejaswin Shankar (IND) | 46.29 | 53.37 | 51.81 | 53.37 | 639 | |
| 6 | Chen Xinghua (CHN) | 50.92 | 49.68 | 51.19 | 51.19 | 606 | |
| 7 | Zakhiriddin Shokirov (UZB) | 48.84 | 49.42 | X | 49.42 | 580 | |
| 8 | Yuma Maruyama (JPN) | 47.29 | – | – | 47.29 | 549 | |
| 9 | Keisuke Okuda (JPN) | 46.97 | – | – | 46.97 | 544 | |
| 10 | Lee Yu-seong (KOR) | 41.75 | 39.35 | 39.98 | 41.75 | 468 | |

=== 1500 metres ===
| Rank | Athlete | Time | Points | Notes |
|---|---|---|---|---|
| 1 | Tejaswin Shankar (IND) | 4:33.09 | 724 | |
| 2 | Yuma Maruyama (JPN) | 4:33.92 | 719 | |
| 3 | Chen Xinghua (CHN) | 4:37.38 | 697 | |
| 4 | Zakhiriddin Shokirov (UZB) | 4:39.93 | 681 | |
| 5 | Lee Yu-seong (KOR) | 4:41.84 | 669 | |
| 6 | Wang Chen-yu (TPE) | 4:54.01 | 595 | |
| 7 | Cho Chia-hsuan (TPE) | 4:56.40 | 581 | |
| 8 | Park Jun-young (KOR) | 5:01.09 | 553 | |
| 9 | Nodir Norbaev (UZB) | 5:04.62 | 533 | |
| 10 | Keisuke Okuda (JPN) | 5:39.13 | 355 | |

=== Summary ===
| Rank | Athlete | 100m | LJ | SP | HJ | 400m | 110mH | DT | PV | JT | 1500m | Total | Notes |
|---|---|---|---|---|---|---|---|---|---|---|---|---|---|
| 1st place, gold medalist(s) | Yuma Maruyama (JPN) | 917 | 842 | 730 | 803 | 896 | 975 | 751 | 941 | 549 | 719 | 8123 | |
| 2nd place, silver medalist(s) | Chen Xinghua (CHN) | 924 | 918 | 682 | 749 | 977 | 973 | 696 | 790 | 606 | 697 | 8012 | |
| 3rd place, bronze medalist(s) | Tejaswin Shankar (IND) | 865 | 942 | 677 | 973 | 881 | 932 | 599 | 702 | 639 | 724 | 7934 | |
| 4 | Nodir Norbaev (UZB) | 832 | 823 | 670 | 831 | 799 | 899 | 702 | 790 | 770 | 533 | 7649 | PB |
| 5 | Wang Chen-yu (TPE) | 827 | 838 | 701 | 696 | 765 | 907 | 691 | 760 | 735 | 595 | 7515 | |
| 6 | Zakhiriddin Shokirov (UZB) | 771 | 898 | 646 | 776 | 726 | 845 | 705 | 819 | 580 | 681 | 7447 | |
| 7 | Keisuke Okuda (JPN) | 935 | 842 | 673 | 619 | 843 | 915 | 744 | 760 | 544 | 355 | 7230 | |
| 8 | Cho Chia-hsuan (TPE) | 797 | 776 | 661 | 696 | 734 | 837 | 560 | 673 | 767 | 581 | 7082 | |
| 9 | Lee Yu-seong (KOR) | 903 | 746 | 546 | 593 | 853 | 785 | 481 | 760 | 468 | 669 | 6804 | |
| 10 | Park Jun-young (KOR) | 778 | 729 | 593 | 670 | 734 | 758 | 546 | 617 | 651 | 553 | 6629 | |
| — | Thowfeeq Noushad (IND) | 856 | 903 | 531 | 696 | 690 | DNS | NM | | | | DNF | |
| — | Ali Hassan Beedh (KSA) | 858 | 792 | 680 | DNS | | | | | | | DNF | |
| — | Haroun Ahmat (QAT) | DNS | | | | | | | | | | DNS | |
| — | Elbraa Hassan (QAT) | DNS | | | | | | | | | | DNS | |
