= 2025 Asian Athletics Championships – Men's decathlon =

Men's decathlon at the 2025 Asian Athletics Championships
- Venue: Gumi Civic Stadium
- Location: Gumi, South Korea
- Dates: 27-28 May
- Competitors: 11 from 9 nations
- Winning score: 7634

Medalists
gold medal	Fei Xiang	China
silver medal	Tejaswin Shankar	India
bronze medal	Keisuke Okuda	Japan

The men's decathlon event at the 2025 Asian Athletics Championships was held on 27 and 28 May.

== Records ==
Records before the 2023 Asian Athletics Championships
Record	Athlete (nation)	Points	Location	Date
World record	Kevin Mayer (FRA)	9126	Talence, France	16 September 2018
Asian record	Dmitriy Karpov (KAZ)	8725	Athens, Greece	24 August 2004
Championship record	Dmitriy Karpov (KAZ)	8037	Pune, India	4 July 2013
World leading	Till Steinforth (GER)	8265	Des Moines, United States	24 April 2025
Asian leading	No scores recorded			

== Results ==
=== 100 metres ===
Place	Athlete	Nation	Time	Points	Notes
1	Yuma Maruyama	Japan	10.92	878	
2	Keisuke Okuda	Japan	11.05	850	
3	Tejaswin Shankar	India	11.20	817	
4	Cho Chia Hsuan	Chinese Taipei	11.27	801	
5	Mohsen Hassan Al-Dabbous	Saudi Arabia	11.29	797	
6	Park Jun-young	South Korea	11.33	789	
7	Wang Chen-yu	Chinese Taipei	11.34	786	
8	Fei Xiang	China	11.49	755	
9	Nodir Norbaev	Uzbekistan	11.50	753	
10	Haman Ghrairi	Iraq	11.53	746	
11	Hocket de los Santos	Philippines	11.55	742	

=== Long jump ===
Place	Athlete	Nation	#1	#2	#3	Result	Points	Notes	Total
1	Tejaswin Shankar	India	7.23 (−0.2 m/s)	7.28 (+0.2 m/s)	7.25 (−0.1 m/s)	7.28 m (+0.2 m/s)	881		1698
2	Yuma Maruyama	Japan	7.26 (−0.8 m/s)	7.11 (+0.8 m/s)	x	7.26 m (−0.8 m/s)	876		1754
3	Fei Xiang	China	6.54 (−0.4 m/s)	6.93 (±0.0 m/s)	7.06 (+0.1 m/s)	7.06 m (+0.1 m/s)	828		1583
4	Cho Chia Hsuan	Chinese Taipei	6.67 (−0.1 m/s)	7.03 (+0.9 m/s)	6.87 (+0.1 m/s)	7.03 m (+0.9 m/s)	821		1622
5	Wang Chen-yu	Chinese Taipei	6.78 (−0.5 m/s)	6.82 (+0.3 m/s)	7.03 (+0.1 m/s)	7.03 m (+0.1 m/s)	821		1607
6	Nodir Norbaev	Uzbekistan	x	6.70 (−0.3 m/s)	6.84 (+0.3 m/s)	6.84 m (+0.3 m/s)	776		1529
7	Park Jun-young	South Korea	6.45 (+1.0 m/s)	6.74 (−0.3 m/s)	x	6.74 m (−0.3 m/s)	753		1542
8	Keisuke Okuda	Japan	6.73 (+1.4 m/s)	6.61 (−0.7 m/s)	x	6.73 m (+1.4 m/s)	750		1600
9	Haman Ghrairi	Iraq	6.41 (−0.3 m/s)	6.59 (±0.0 m/s)	6.73 (+0.3 m/s)	6.73 m (+0.3 m/s)	750		1496
10	Hocket de los Santos	Philippines	6.09 (+1.0 m/s)	5.76 (−0.1 m/s)	4.53 (+1.4 m/s)	6.09 m (+1.0 m/s)	606		1348
—	Mohsen Hassan Al-Dabbous	Saudi Arabia				DNS	0		DNF

=== Shot put ===
Place	Athlete	Nation	#1	#2	#3	Result	Points	Notes	Total
1	Wang Chen-yu	Chinese Taipei	13.60	x	13.86	13.86 m	720		2327
2	Tejaswin Shankar	India	12.84	12.81	13.79	13.79 m	715		2413
3	Yuma Maruyama	Japan	13.61	x	13.42	13.61 m	704		2458
4	Fei Xiang	China	12.89	13.25	12.01	13.25 m	682		2265
5	Keisuke Okuda	Japan	12.57	12.88	12.29	12.88 m	660		2260
6	Haman Ghrairi	Iraq	12.40	12.15	12.03	12.40 m	631		2127
7	Cho Chia Hsuan	Chinese Taipei	11.35	12.23	12.24	12.24 m	621		2243
8	Park Jun-young	South Korea	11.76	x	10.77	11.76 m	592		2134
9	Hocket de los Santos	Philippines	10.46	10.62	10.92	10.92 m	541		1889
—	Nodir Norbaev	Uzbekistan				DNS	0		DNF
—	Mohsen Hassan Al-Dabbous	Saudi Arabia				DNS	0		DNF

=== High jump ===
Place	Athlete	Nation	1.71	1.74	1.77	1.80	1.83	1.86	1.89	1.92	1.95	1.98	2.01	2.04	2.10	2.13	2.16	2.19	2.22	Result	Points	Notes	Total
1	Tejaswin Shankar	India	-	-	-	-	o	o	o	o	o	xxo	-	o	o	o	o	o	xxx	2.19 m	982		3395
2	Fei Xiang	China	-	-	-	-	-	-	-	-	-	-	o	xxx						2.01 m	813		3078
3	Yuma Maruyama	Japan	-	-	-	-	-	o	o	o	xo	xxx								1.95 m	758		3216
3	Wang Chen-yu	Chinese Taipei	-	-	-	-	-	o	o	o	xo	xxx								1.95 m	758		3085
5	Park Jun-young	South Korea	-	-	-	o	o	xo	xo	xo	xo	xxx								1.95 m	758		2892
6	Cho Chia Hsuan	Chinese Taipei	-	-	-	o	-	xxo	xo	o	xxx									1.92 m	731		2974
7	Haman Ghrairi	Iraq	o	-	xo															1.86 m	679		2806
8	Hocket de los Santos	Philippines	o	o	xo															1.77 m	602		2491
9	Keisuke Okuda	Japan	o	xxo	xxx															1.74 m	577		2837

=== 400 metres ===
Place	Athlete	Nation	Time	Points	Notes	Total
1	Keisuke Okuda	Japan	48.50	885		3722
2	Hocket de los Santos	Philippines	49.17	853		3344
3	Haman Ghrairi	Iraq	49.24	850		3656
4	Yuma Maruyama	Japan	49.25	849		4065
5	Tejaswin Shankar	India	50.10	810		4205
6	Fei Xiang	China	50.39	797		3875
7	Park Jun-young	South Korea	50.47	793		3685
8	Wang Chen-yu	Chinese Taipei	50.66	784		3869
9	Cho Chia Hsuan	Chinese Taipei	50.96	771		3745

=== 110 metres hurdles ===
Place	Athlete	Nation	Time	Points	Notes	Total
1	Yuma Maruyama	Japan	14.53	907		4972
2	Tejaswin Shankar	India	14.56	903		4772
3	Wang Chen-yu	Chinese Taipei	14.58	901		5106
4	Fei Xiang	China	14.61	897		4772
5	Cho Chia Hsuan	Chinese Taipei	14.67	890		4635
6	Keisuke Okuda	Japan	14.91	860		4582
7	Haman Ghrairi	Iraq	15.31	812		4468
8	Hocket de los Santos	Philippines	15.33	810		4154
9	Park Jun-young	South Korea	15.41	801		4486

=== Discus throw ===
Place	Athlete	Nation	#1	#2	#3	Result	Points	Notes	Total
1	Keisuke Okuda	Japan	x	42.69	42.21	42.69 m	719		5301
2	Fei Xiang	China	33.88	41.19	41.60 m	41.60 m	697		5469
3	Wang Chen-yu	Chinese Taipei	38.83	39.62	x	39.62 m	657		5429
4	Yuma Maruyama	Japan	39.53	-	-	39.53 m	655		5627
5	Tejaswin Shankar	India	35.69	36.72	37.74	37.74 m	619		5725
6	Cho Chia Hsuan	Chinese Taipei	34.91	36.21	x	36.21 m	588		5223
7	Haman Ghrairi	Iraq	32.57	x	33.70	33.70 m	538		5006
8	Hocket de los Santos	Philippines	33.57	x	x	33.57 m	535		4689
9	Park Jun-young	South Korea	29.63	31.82	x	31.82 m	500		4986

=== Pole vault ===
Place	Athlete	Nation	3.60	3.70	3.80	3.90	4.00	4.10	4.20	4.30	4.40	4.50	4.60	4.70	4.80	4.90	5.00	5.10	Result	Points	Notes	Total
1	Hocket de los Santos	Philippines	-	-	-	-	-	-	-	-	-	-	-	xo	-	xo	-	xxx	4.90 m	880		5569
2	Fei Xiang	China	-	-	-	-	-	-	-	-	xxo	-	o	-	xo	xxx			4.80 m	849		6318
3	Keisuke Okuda	Japan	-	-	-	-	-	-	xo	o	xxo	xo	-	xo	xxx				4.70 m	819		6120
4	Park Jun-young	South Korea	-	-	-	-	o	-	o	-	o	-	xo	xxx					4.60 m	790		5776
5	Cho Chia Hsuan	Chinese Taipei	-	-	-	xo	-	xo	xo	o	xxx								4.30 m	702		5925
6	Wang Chen-yu	Chinese Taipei	-	-	-	-	xo	-	o	xo	xxx								4.30 m	702		6131
7	Yuma Maruyama	Japan	-	-	-	-	-	-	o	-	-	-	xxx						4.20 m	673		6300
8	Haman Ghrairi	Iraq	o	-	o	o	xo	o	xxx										4.10 m	645		5651
9	Tejaswin Shankar	India	-	o	o	o	xxx												3.90 m	590		6315

=== Javelin throw ===
Place	Athlete	Nation	#1	#2	#3	Result	Points	Notes	Total
1	Keisuke Okuda	Japan	54.57	64.24	x	64.24 m	802		6922
2	Wang Chen-yu	Chinese Taipei	63.21	63.24	64.16	64.16 m	801		6932
3	Cho Chia Hsuan	Chinese Taipei	57.12	54.55	58.11	58.11 m	709		6634
4	Fei Xiang	China	53.72	55.09	54.15	55.09 m	664		6982
5	Tejaswin Shankar	India	x	50.18	51.46	51.46 m	610		6925
6	Park Jun-young	South Korea	50.31	50.90	47.41	50.90 m	602		6378
7	Haman Ghrairi	Iraq	48.05	50.11	x	50.11 m	590		6241
8	Yuma Maruyama	Japan	47.03	49.79	48.89	49.79 m	585		6885
9	Hocket de los Santos	Philippines	39.82	47.26	49.26	49.26 m	578		6147

=== 1500 metres ===
Place	Athlete	Nation	Time	Points	Notes	Total
1	Haman Ghrairi	Iraq	4:28.80	753		6994
2	Hocket de los Santos	Philippines	4:36.78	701		6848
3	Tejaswin Shankar	India	4:37.99	693		7618
4	Keisuke Okuda	Japan	4:40.04	680		7602
5	Park Jun-young	South Korea	4:40.86	675		7053
6	Fei Xiang	China	4:44.50	652		7634
7	Cho Chia Hsuan	Chinese Taipei	4:46.35	641		7275
8	Wang Chen-yu	Chinese Taipei	4:50.75	614		7546
—	Yuma Maruyama	Japan	DNS	0		DNF

=== Final standings ===
The highest mark recorded in each event is highlighted in yellow

Place	Athlete	Nation	100m	LJ	SP	HJ	400m	110m H	DT	PV	JT	1500m	Points	Notes
1st place, gold medalist(s)	Fei Xiang	China	11.49	7.06	13.25	2.01	50.39	14.61	41.60	4.80	55.09	4:44.50	7634	
2nd place, silver medalist(s)	Tejaswin Shankar	India	11.20	7.28	13.79	2.19	50.10	14.58	37.74	3.90	51.46	4:37.99	7618	
3rd place, bronze medalist(s)	Keisuke Okuda	Japan	11.05	6.73	12.88	1.74	48.50	14.91	42.69	4.70	64.24	4:40.04	7602	
4	Wang Chen-yu	Chinese Taipei	11.34	7.03	13.86	1.95	50.66	14.56	39.62	4.30	64.16	4:50.75	7546	
5	Cho Chia Hsuan	Chinese Taipei	11.27	7.03	12.24	1.92	50.96	14.67	36.21	4.30	58.11	4:46.35	7275	
6	Park Jun-young	South Korea	11.33	6.74	11.76	1.95	50.47	15.41	31.82	4.60	50.90	4:40.86	7053	
7	Haman Ghrairi	Iraq	11.53	6.73	12.40	1.86	49.24	15.31	33.70	4.10	50.11	4:28.80	6994	
8	Hocket de los Santos	Philippines	11.55	6.09	10.92	1.77	49.17	15.33	33.57	4.90	49.26	4:36.78	6848	
—	Yuma Maruyama	Japan	10.92	7.26	13.61	1.95	49.25	14.53	39.53	4.20	49.79	DNS	DNF	
—	Nodir Norbaev	Uzbekistan	11.50	6.84	DNS								DNF	
—	Mohsen Hassan Al-Dabbous	Saudi Arabia	11.29	DNS									DNF	
