= Grenada at the 2026 Commonwealth Games =

- Flag of Grenada
- CG code: GRN
- CGA: Grenada Commonwealth Games Association
- Website: grenadaolympic.com

in Glasgow, Scotland 23 July 2026 – 2 August 2026
- Competitors: 10 in 3 sports
- Flag bearer: Zachary Gresham
- Baton bearer: Tilly Collymore
- Medals Ranked =23rd: Gold 1 Silver 0 Bronze 0 Total 1

Commonwealth Games appearances (overview)
- 1970; 1974; 1978; 1982; 1986–1994; 1998; 2002; 2006; 2010; 2014; 2018; 2022; 2026; 2030

Grenada competed at the 2026 Commonwealth Games in Glasgow, Scotland. This marked Grenada's country's 12th participation at the games, after making its debut at the 1970 Commonwealth Games.

The King's Baton relay stopped in Grenada in April 2025. The team from Grenada consisted of ten athletes (eight men and two women) competing in three sports. Grenada competed in para sports for the first time at the Commonwealth Games.

Swimmer Zachary Gresham was the country's flagbearer during the opening ceremony. Meanwhile, fellow swimmer Ryan Bester was the baton bearer during the opening ceremony.

Grenada's only medal was a gold by Lindon Victor in the men's decathlon, his third consecutive gold medal in the event.

== Competitors ==
The following is the list of number of competitors participating at the Games per sport/discipline.

Sport		Men	Women	Total
Athletics	Athletics	5	1	6
Athletics	Para-athletics	1	0	1
Swimming		1	1	2
Track cycling		1	0	1
Total		8	2	10

== Medalist ==
The following athlete won a medal at the games. In the by discipline sections below, medallists' names are bolded.

Medal	Name	Sport	Event	Date	Ref.
Gold	Lindon Victor	Athletics	Men's decathlon	31 July	

== Athletics ==
Grenada entered six athletes (five men and one woman).

Track events

Athlete	Event	Heat		Semifinal		Final	
Athlete	Event	Result	Rank	Result	Rank	Result	Rank
Shaquane Toussaint	Men's 200 m	20.87	3	Did not advance			
Michael Francois	Men's 400 m	46.62	3	Did not advance			
Joshem Sylvester	Men's 400 m	48.17	4	Did not advance			
Jamara Patterson	Women's 400 m	52.79	8 **q**	52.92	3	Did not advance	

Field events

Athlete	Event	Qualification		Final	
Athlete	Event	Result	Rank	Result	Rank
Anderson Peters	Men's javelin throw	81.29	2 **q**	83.88	4

Combined events – Decathlon

Athlete	Event	100 m	LJ	SP	HJ	400 m	110H	DT	PV	JT	1500 m	Final	Rank
**Lindon Victor**	Result	10.54	7.20	16.09	1.82	49.41	15.67	53.52	4.70	63.06	4:51.78	8096	1st place, gold medalist(s)
**Lindon Victor**	Points	966	862	857	644	842	770	944	819	784	608	8096	1st place, gold medalist(s)

=== Para athletics ===
Grenada entered one male para athlete. Nickel Walters was the first para athlete to represent Grenada at the Commonwealth Games.

Athlete	Event	Final	
Athlete	Event	Result	Rank
Nickel Walters	Men's discus throw F44	25.78 **PB**	10

== Swimming ==
Grenada entered two swimmers, one per gender.

Athlete	Event	Heat		Semifinal		Final	
Athlete	Event	Time	Rank	Time	Rank	Time	Rank
Zackary Gresham	Men's 100 m backstroke	57.94	15 **Q**	58.54	16	Did not advance	
Zackary Gresham	Men's 200 m breaststroke	DNS		—N/a		Did not advance	
Zackary Gresham	Men's 50 m butterfly	25.20	35	Did not advance			
Zackary Gresham	Men's 100 m butterfly	55.77	23	Did not advance			
Tilly Collymore	Women's 50 m freestyle	26.83	26	Did not advance			
Tilly Collymore	Women's 100 m freestyle	57.57	25	Did not advance			
Tilly Collymore	Women's 200 m freestyle	2:06.23	20	—N/a		Did not advance	
Tilly Collymore	Women's 50 m butterfly	28.99	32	Did not advance			

== Track cycling ==
Grenada entered one male track cyclist.

Elimination race

Athlete	Event	Final
Athlete	Event	Rank
Red Walters	Men's elimination race	15

Points race

Athlete	Event	Qualification		Final	
Athlete	Event	Points	Rank	Points	Rank
Red Walters	Men's point race	DNS			

Scratch race

Athlete	Event	Qualification	Final
Athlete	Event	Rank	Rank
Red Walters	Men's scratch race	9 **Q**	DNF
