= Lewis Church =

British athlete (born 1996)

Personal information
- Nationality: British
- Born: 27 September 1996 (age 29)

Sport
- Sport: Athletics
- Event: Decathlon

Achievements and titles
- Personal bests: Decathlon: 8093 (Götzis, 2025); Heptathlon: 5831 (Stockholm, 2025)

Lewis Church (born 27 September 1996) is a British multi-event athlete. He has won British national titles in the decathlon and indoor heptathlon.

== Biography ==
Church won the senior heptathlon title at the 2022 British Indoor Athletics Championships in Birmingham, with a tally of 5488 points.

He won the heptathlon again at the UK Indoor Combined Events Championships in Birmingham in February 2023, retaining his title with a score of 5529 points. He won the decathlon at the England Athletics Senior Open Championships in July 2023 with 7660 points in Chelmsford. In October 2023, he set the British record in the speed decathlon with 7189 points in Basingstoke.

He was runner-up to Sam Talbot at the UK Indoor Combined Events Championship in Sheffield in January 2024, but won the title the following year with 5778 points, 70 ahead of Sammy Ball.

He won the Multistars decathlon in Italy in April 2025 with a score of 8067 points. He finished thirteenth in the decathlon at the Hypo-Meeting in Götzis, Austria, in 2025 with a new personal best tally of 8093 points. He finished thirteenth overall in the season-long World Athletics Combined Events Tour for 2025.

On 18 January 2026, Church retained his heptathlon title at the England Athletics Senior Indoor Combined Event Championships, with a tally of 5767 points. Church was a finalist in the 60 metres hurdles at the 2026 British Indoor Athletics Championships in Birmingham, on 14 February 2026. In May, Church was 17th in the decathlon with 7666 points at the 2026 Hypo-Meeting in Götzis. He was selected to represent England at the 2026 Commonwealth Games in Glasgow, placing fifth overall in decathlon with 7846 points.
