= William Grimsey =

Scottish high jumper (born 1996)

Personal information
- Nationality: British (Scottish)
- Born: 14 December 1996 (age 29) Scotland

Sport
- Sport: Athletics
- Event: High jump
- Club: Woodford Green & Essex Ladies
Medal record
Representing Scotland
British Championships
Gold medal – first place	2024 Manchester	high jump

William Grimsey (born 14 December 1996) is a Scottish athlete specialising in the high jump.

== Biography ==
In 2021, Grimsey won the silver medal for Great Britain at the 2021 European Athletics Team Championships.

In 2022, Grimsey represented Scotland at the 2022 Commonwealth Games, finishing in seventh place during the high jump event.

He became British champion when winning the high jump event at the 2024 British Athletics Championships with a jump of 2.15 metres.
