= Athletics at the 2022 Commonwealth Games – Men's high jump =

Men's high jump at the 2022 Commonwealth Games
- Venue: Alexander Stadium
- Dates: 3 August
- Competitors: 13 from 11 nations
- Winning height: 2.25 m

Medalists
gold medal	Hamish Kerr	New Zealand
silver medal	Brandon Starc	Australia
bronze medal	Tejaswin Shankar	India

The men's high jump at the 2022 Commonwealth Games, as part of the athletics programme, took place in the Alexander Stadium on 3 August 2022.

For the fifth time, the gold and silver medallists achieved the same height in this competition. The previous four occasions occurred in 1934, 1982, 1994 and 2006.

== Records ==
Prior to this competition, the existing world and Games records were as follows:

World record	Javier Sotomayor (CUB)	2.45 m	Salamanca, Spain	23 July 1993
Commonwealth record	Derek Drouin (CAN)	2.40 m	Des Moines, United States	25 April 2014
Games record	Clarence Saunders (BER)	2.36 m	Auckland, New Zealand	1 February 1990

== Schedule ==
The schedule was as follows:

Date	Time	Round
Wednesday 3 August 2022	19:00	Final

All times are British Summer Time (UTC+1)

== Results ==
=== Final ===
The medals were determined in the final.

Rank	Name	2.00	2.05	2.10	2.15	2.19	2.22	2.25	2.28	2.31	Result	Notes
1st place, gold medalist(s)	Hamish Kerr (NZL)	–	–	–	o	o	o	o	xxx		2.25	
2nd place, silver medalist(s)	Brandon Starc (AUS)	–	o	o	xo	xxo	xo	o	xxx		2.25	
3rd place, bronze medalist(s)	Tejaswin Shankar (IND)	–	–	o	o	o	o	xx-	x		2.22	
4	Donald Thomas (BAH)	–	o	o	xo	–	xo	xxx			2.22	
5	Joel Clarke-Khan (ENG)	–	–	o	o	o	xxo	xxx			2.22	
6	Mike Edwards (NGR)	–	–	o	o	o	xxx				2.19	
7	William Grimsey (SCO)	–	–	o	o	xo	xx-	x			2.19	
8	Romaine Beckford (JAM)	–	o	xo	o	xxo	xxx				2.19	
9	David Smith (SCO)	–	–	–	o	xxx					2.15	
10	Shaun Miller (BAH)	–	–	o	xxx						2.10	
11	Mahfuzur Rahman (BAN)	–	xxo	o	xxx						2.10	SB
12	Kampton Kam (SGP)	o	o	xxo	xxx						2.10	
13	Nauraj Singh Randhawa (MAS)	–	o	xxx							2.05	
