= Fei Xiang (decathlete) =

Chinese athlete

Personal information
- Born: 9 September 1998 (age 27)

Sport
- Sport: Athletics
- Event: Decathlon

Achievements and titles
- Personal best(s): Heptathlon: 5525 (2025); Decathlon: 7815 (2024)
Medal record
Men's athletics
Representing China
Asian Championships
Gold medal – first place	2025 Gumi	Decathlon

Fei Xiang (born 9 September 1998) is a Chinese multi-event athlete. He won the gold medal in decathlon at the 2025 Asian Athletics Championships.

== Career ==
He won the indoor heptathlon at the Chinese Indoor Championships in March 2025.

He was the gold medalist in decathlon at the 2025 Asian Athletics Championships in Gumi, South Korea on 28 May 2025 with a tally of 7634 points. He won the decathlon at the Chinese Athletics Championships in August 2025.

He competed in decathlon for China at the 2025 World Athletics Championships in Tokyo, Japan, placing fourteenth overall.
