= 2015 World Youth Championships in Athletics – Boys' high jump =

Boys' high jump at the 2015 World Youth Championships in Athletics
- Venue: Estadio Olímpico Pascual Guerrero
- Dates: 16 and 18 July
- Competitors: 27 from 22 nations
- Winning height: 2.20

Medalists
gold medal	Stefano Sottile	Italy
silver medal	Dmytro Nikitin	Ukraine
bronze medal	Darius Carbin	United States

The boys' high jump at the 2015 World Youth Championships in Athletics was held at the Estadio Olímpico Pascual Guerrero in Cali, Colombia on 16 and 18 July 2015.

Stefano Sottile's first-try winning jump was described as "one of the picture-book moments of the championships". It was Italy's second ever gold medal at the World Youth Championships.

== Records ==
Prior to the competition, the following records were as follows.

World Youth Best	Javier Sotomayor (CUB)	2.33	Havana, Cuba	19 May 1984
Championship Record	Huang Haiqiang (CHN)	2.27	Marrakesh, Morocco	16 July 2005
World Youth Leading	Stefano Sottile (ITA)	2.20	Turin, Italy	10 May 2015

== Results ==
=== Qualification ===
With qualifying standard of 2.11 (Q) or at least the 12 best performers (q) advance to the final.

Rank	Group	Name	Nationality	1.90	1.95	2.00	2.04	2.08	2.11	Mark	Notes
1	B	Darius Carbin	United States	–	–	o	o	o		2.08	q
1	A	Dmytro Nikitin	Ukraine	–	–	o	o	o		2.08	q
1	A	Jaron Brooks	United States	–	–	o	o	o		2.08	q
1	A	Remo Cagliesi	Germany	–	o	o	o	o		2.08	q
1	B	Stefano Sottile	Italy	–	–	o	–	o		2.08	q
6	B	Alperen Acet	Turkey	–	o	o	xo	o		2.08	q
7	B	Lushane Wilson	Jamaica	o	–	xo	xo	o		2.08	q
8	A	Roshan Ranatungage	Sri Lanka	–	–	xo	xo	xo		2.08	q
8	A	Tejaswin Shankar	India	–	o	xo	xo	xo		2.08	q
10	B	Brenton Foster	Australia	–	–	o	o	xxo		2.08	q
11	B	Maciej Grynienko	Poland	–	–	o	o	xxx		2.04	q
11	B	Ding Shuo	China	–	–	o	o	xxx		2.04	q
13	A	Quentin Aboukir	France	–	o	xo	o	xxx		2.04	
13	B	Joel Della Siega	Canada	o	o	xo	o	xxx		2.04	
15	A	Jermaine Francis	Saint Kitts and Nevis	o	o	o	xo	xxx		2.04	
16	A	Muhammad Syazwan Ahmad	Malaysia	xo	o	o	xo	xxx		2.04	
16	B	Lucas Mihota	Germany	o	xo	o	xo	xxx		2.04	
18	A	Enes Talha Şenses	Turkey	o	o	xxo	xo	xxx		2.04	
19	B	Norris Brioche	Seychelles	o	o	o	xxo	xxx		2.04	
19	A	Roberto Vílches	Mexico	o	o	o	xxo	xxx		2.04	
21	B	Ondřej Vodák	Czech Republic	xo	o	o	xxo	xxx		2.04	
22	A	Nomar Galarza	Puerto Rico	o	o	o	xxx			2.00	
22	B	Roman Kuzminov	Ukraine	–	o	o	xxx			2.00	
24	A	Go Miura	Japan	o	xo	o	xxx			2.00	
25	A	Vizamuje Ujaha	Namibia	o	o	xxo	xxx			2.00	
26	B	Noah Matacun	Croatia	o	o	xxx				1.95	
–	A	Joshua Connolly	Australia	–	–	xxx				NM	

=== Final ===
Rank	Name	Nationality	1.97	2.02	2.07	2.11	2.14	2.16	2.18	2.20	2.22	Mark	Notes
1st place, gold medalist(s)	Stefano Sottile	Italy	–	o	o	xo	xxo	xxo	xo	o	xxx	2.20	WYL
2nd place, silver medalist(s)	Dmytro Nikitin	Ukraine	–	o	xo	o	xo	o	o	x–	xx	2.18	PB
3rd place, bronze medalist(s)	Darius Carbin	United States	–	o	o	o	o	xxo	xxx			2.16	PB
4	Alperen Acet	Turkey	o	o	o	xxo	o	xxx				2.14	SB
5	Jaron Brooks	United States	–	o	o	xo	xo	xxx				2.14	
6	Lushane Wilson	Jamaica	o	o	o	xo	xxx					2.11	
7	Ding Shuo	China	o	o	o	xxx						2.07	
8	Brenton Foster	Australia	o	xo	o	xxx						2.07	
8	Tejaswin Shankar	India	o	xo	o	xxx						2.07	
10	Maciej Grynienko	Poland	o	o	xxo	xxx						2.07	
11	Remo Cagliesi	Germany	o	o	xxx							2.02	
11	Roshan Ranatungage	Sri Lanka	–	o	xxx							2.02	
