= Rafer Joseph =

British athlete

Personal information
- Nationality: Athletics
- Born: 21 July 1968 (age 57) Andover, Hampshire, England

Sport
- Sport: Athletics
- Event: Decathlon
- Club: Basingstoke & Mid Hants
- Now coaching: Sammy Ball

Achievements and titles
- Personal best: Decathlon: 7,563 points (1994)

Rafer Ernest Lewis Joseph (born 21 July 1968) is a retired decathlete from England.

== Biography ==
Joseph became the British decathlon champion after winning the British AAA Championships title at the 1998 AAA Championships.

In 1994, he represented England in the decathlon at the Commonwealth Games in Victoria, Canada. Four years later, he represented England at the Commonwealth Games in Kuala Lumpur, Malaysia.

== Personal bests ==
Information from World Athletics profile unless otherwise noted.

As of 3 July 2025

Event	Performance	Location	Date
100 metres	10.9h (+1.8 m/s)	Dartford	16 May 1998
110 metres hurdles	15.12 (+0.3 m/s)	Watford	21 June 1998
Pole vault	4.60 m (15 ft 1 in)	Watford	21 June 1998
Discus throw	51.18 m (167 ft 10 3/4 in)	Basingstoke	21 May 2005

Event	Performance	Location	Date	Points
Decathlon	—N/a	Brixen	2–3 July 1994	7,563 points
100 metres	11.17 (-0.3 m/s)	Brixen	2 July 1994	823 points
Long jump	6.86 m (22 ft 6 in) (+0.4 m/s)	Brixen	2 July 1994	781 points
Shot put	14.10 m (46 ft 3 in)	Brixen	4 July 1998	734 points
High jump	1.98 m (6 ft 5 3/4 in)	Stoke-on-Trent	6 July 1991	785 points
400 metres	50.33	Brixen	2 July 1994	799 points
110 metres hurdles	14.89 (-0.7 m/s)	Tallinn	29 June 1997	863 points
Discus throw	50.66 m (166 ft 2 1/4 in)	Brixen	3 July 1994	884 points
Pole vault	4.60 m (15 ft 1 in)	Watford	21 June 1998	790 points
Javelin throw	59.92 m (196 ft 7 in)	Brixen	3 July 1994	737 points
1500 metres	4:46.91	Brixen	5 July 1998	637 points
Virtual Best Performance				7,833 points
