= Sutthisak Singkhon =

Thai decathlete

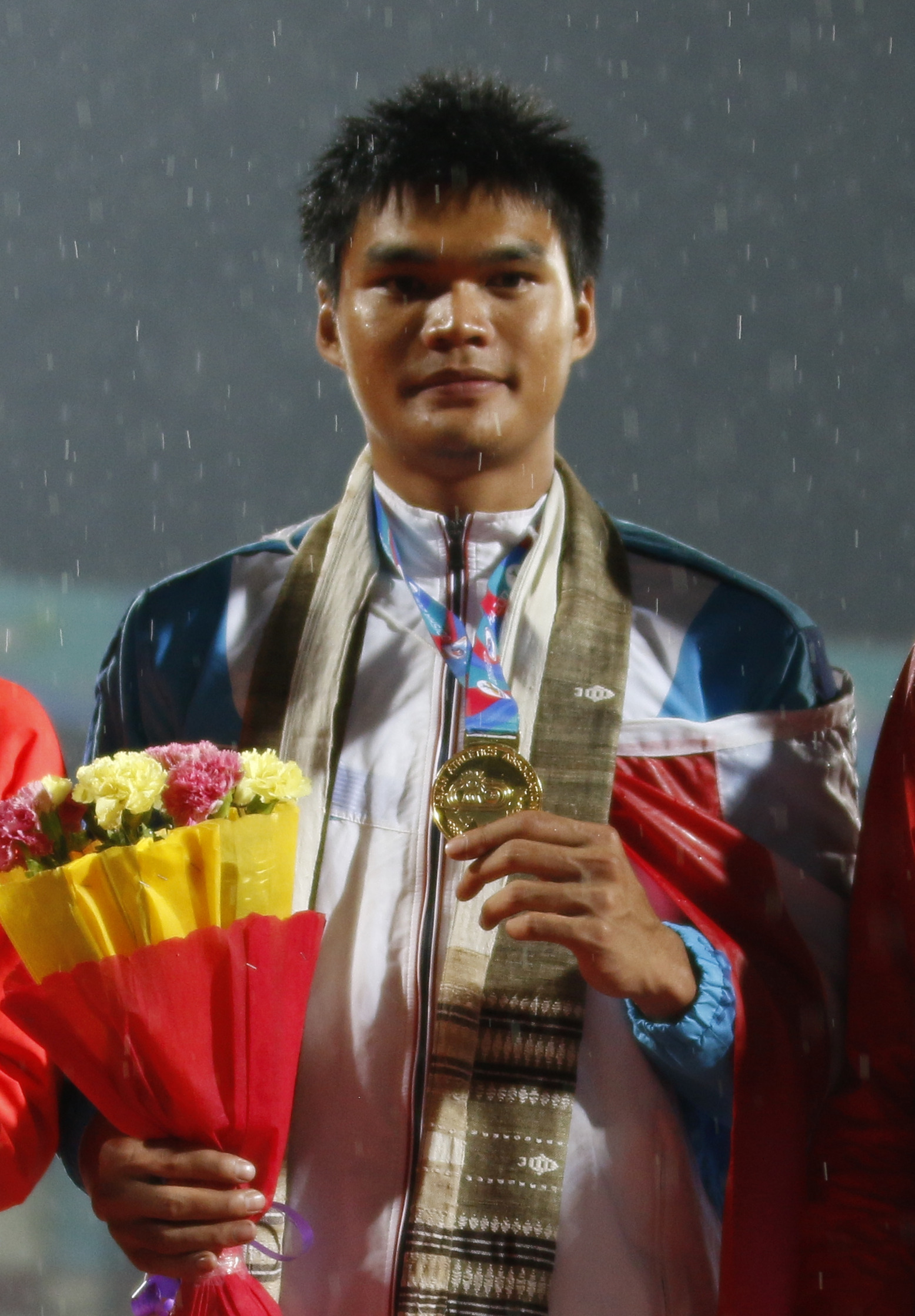
- Singkhon at the 2017 Asian Championships

Personal information
- Born: 5 October 1996 (age 29) Maha Sarakham, Thailand
- Education: Thammasat University
- Height: 1.90 m (6 ft 3 in)
- Weight: 90 kg (198 lb)

Sport
- Sport: Athletics
- Event: Decathlon
- Coached by: Vyacheslav Kovitskiy
Medal record
Representing Thailand
Men's athletics
Universiade
Bronze medal – third place	2019 Naples	Decathlon
Asian Championships
Gold medal – first place	2017 Bhubaneswar	Decathlon
Asian Games
Silver medal – second place	2018 Jakarta-Palembang	Decathlon
Asian Indoor and Martial Arts Games
Silver medal – second place	2017 Ashgabat	Heptathlon
Southeast Asian Games
Gold medal – first place	2021 Hanoi	Decathlon
Gold medal – first place	2023 Cambodia	Decathlon
Silver medal – second place	2017 Kuala Lumpur	Decathlon
Silver medal – second place	2025 Bangkok	Decathlon
Bronze medal – third place	2019 Philippines	Long jump

Sutthisak Singkhon (Thai: สุทธิศักดิ์ สิงขร; born 5 October 1996) is a Thai decathlete. He competed at the 2017 World Championships dropping out after four events. Earlier that year, he won the gold medal at the 2017 Asian Championships, where he set a national record. He won a silver medal at the 2018 Asian Games.

== International competitions ==
Year	Competition	Venue	Position	Event	Notes
Representing Thailand
2017	Asian Championships	Bhubaneswar, India	1st	Decathlon	7732 pts
2017	World Championships	London, United Kingdom	–	Decathlon	DNF
2017	Asian Indoor and Martial Arts Games	Ashgabat, Turkmenistan	2nd	Heptathlon	5332 pts
2018	Asian Games	Jakarta, Indonesia	2nd	Decathlon	7809 pts
2019	Universiade	Naples, Italy	3rd	Decathlon	7511 pts
2023	Asian Championships	Bangkok, Thailand	2nd	Decathlon	7626 pts
2023	World University Games	Chengdu, China	–	Decathlon	DNF
2023	Asian Games	Hangzhou, China	6th	Decathlon	7239 pts

== Personal bests ==
Outdoor

- 100 metres – 10.85 (+1.5 m/s, Jakarta 2018)
- 400 metres – 48.05 (Bangkok 2017)
- 1500 metres – 4:45.18 (Bhubaneswar 2017)
- 110 metres hurdles – 14.80 (0.0 m/s, Bhubaneswar 2017)
- High jump – 2.00 (Jakarta 2018)
- Pole vault – 4.30 (Kuala Lumpur 2017)
- Long jump – 7.83 (Bangkok 2017)
- Shot put – 14.09 (Bhubaneswar 2017)
- Discus throw – 44.42 (Jakarta 2018)
- Javelin throw – 60.64 (Bhubaneswar 2017)
- Decathlon – 7809 (Jakarta 2018)

Indoor

- 60 metres – 7.05 (Ashgabat 2017)
- 1000 metres – 3:07.82 (Ashgabat 2017)
- 60 metres hurdles – 8.49 (Ashgabat 2017)
- High jump – 1.91 (Ashgabat 2017)
- Pole vault – 4.20 (Ashgabat 2017)
- Long jump – 7.32 (Ashgabat 2017)
- Shot put – 14.00 (Ashgabat 2017)
- Heptathlon – 5332 (Ashgabat 2017)
