= Majed Radhi Al-Sayed =

Kuwaiti athlete (born 1993)

Personal information
- Born: 31 January 1993 (age 33)

Sport
- Sport: Athletics
- Event: Decathlon
Medal record
Men's athletics
Representing Kuwait
Asian Indoor Championships
Gold medal – first place	2018 Tehran	Heptathlon

Majed Radhi Mubarak Al-Sayed (born 31 January 1993) is a Kuwaiti decathlete. He won the silver medal at the 2019 Asian Championships. He is the current national record holder in both decathlon and heptathlon.

== International competitions ==
Year	Competition	Venue	Position	Event	Notes
Representing Kuwait
2012	Asian Junior Championships	Colombo, Sri Lanka	2nd	Decathlon (junior)	5957 pts
2015	Arab Championships	Isa Town, Bahrain	4th	Decathlon	6511 pts
2017	Arab Championships	Radès, Tunisia	1st	Decathlon	7118 pts
2017	Asian Championships	Bhubaneswar, India	4th	Decathlon	7441 pts
2018	Asian Indoor Championships	Tehran, Iran	1st	Heptathlon	5228 pts
2018	West Asian Championships	Amman, Jordan	1st	Decathlon	6741 pts
2019	Arab Championships	Cairo, Egypt	1st	Decathlon	7232 pts
2019	Asian Championships	Doha, Qatar	2nd	Decathlon	7838 pts
2022	GCC Games	Kuwait City, Kuwait	3rd	Decathlon	6712 pts
2022	Islamic Solidarity Games	Konya, Turkey	3rd	Pole vault	4.80 m
2024	Asian Indoor Championships	Tehran, Iran	–	Heptathlon	DNF

== Personal bests ==
Outdoor

- 100 metres – 11.22 (+0.8 m/s, Doha 2019)
- 400 metres – 48.69 (Cairo 2019)
- 1500 metres – 4:15.06 (Doha 2019)
- 110 metres hurdles – 14.98 (0.0 m/s, Doha 2017)
- High jump – 1.99 (Doha 2019)
- Pole vault – 4.80 (Doha 2019)
- Long jump – 7.77 (+0.7 m/s, Bhubaneshwar 2017)
- Shot put – 12.98 (Doha 2019)
- Discus throw – 37.66 (Doha 2019)
- Javelin throw – 56.39 (Cairo 2019)
- Decathlon – 7838 (Doha 2019) NR

Indoor

- 60 metres – 7.23 (Tehran 2018)
- 1000 metres – 2:51.78 (Tehran 2018)
- 60 metres hurdles – 8.64 (Tehran 2018)
- High jump – 1.88 (Tehran 2018)
- Pole vault – 4.40 (Tehran 2018)
- Long jump – 7.00 (Tehran 2018)
- Shot put – 12.08 (Tehran 2018)
- Heptathlon – 5228 (Tehran 2018) NR
