= Athletics at the 2019 Summer Universiade – Men's decathlon =

The men's decathlon event at the 2019 Summer Universiade was held on 9 and 10 July at the Stadio San Paolo in Naples.

== Medalists ==
Gold	Silver	Bronze
Aaron Booth; New Zealand	Alexander Diamond; Australia	Sutthisak Singkhon; Thailand

== Results ==
=== 100 metres ===
Wind:
Heat 1: +1.0 m/s, Heat 2: -0.7 m/s

Rank	Heat	Name	Nationality	Time	Points	Notes
1	1	Rafał Abramowski	Poland	10.90	883	
2	2	Gong Kewei	China	10.98	865	
3	2	Aaron Booth	New Zealand	11.09	841	
4	2	Sutthisak Singkhon	Thailand	11.09	841	
5	1	Max Attwell	New Zealand	11.13	832	
6	1	Domantas Dobrega	Lithuania	11.17	823	
7	2	Alexander Diamond	Australia	11.20	817	
8	2	Sergio Pandiani	Argentina	11.20	817	
9	1	Vikas Kaushik	India	11.32	791	
10	2	Luca Bernaschina	Switzerland	11.39	776	
11	2	Harry Maslen	Great Britain	11.42	769	
12	1	Mihkel Holzmann	Estonia	11.64	723	
13	1	Matías Iván Brandoni	Argentina	11.75	701	
14	1	Pauls Bertrams Klucis	Latvia	11.87	677	

=== Long jump ===
Rank	Group	Athlete	Nationality	#1	#2	#3	Result	Points	Notes	Total
1	A	Alexander Diamond	Australia	7.03	7.52	x	7.52	940		1757
2	A	Sutthisak Singkhon	Thailand	x	x	7.28	7.28	881		1722
3	A	Aaron Booth	New Zealand	7.19	7.12	7.02	7.19	859		1700
4	A	Gong Kewei	China	7.15	x	x	7.15	850		1715
5	A	Luca Bernaschina	Switzerland	6.91	x	7.12	7.12	842		1618
6	B	Rafał Abramowski	Poland	7.07	x	x	7.07	830		1713
7	B	Domantas Dobrega	Lithuania	x	x	6.99	6.99	811		1634
8	B	Max Attwell	New Zealand	6.86	6.97	6.60	6.97	807		1639
9	A	Harry Maslen	Great Britain	6.67	6.86	6.55	6.86	781		1550
10	A	Sergio Pandiani	Argentina	x	x	6.79	6.79	764		1581
11	B	Mihkel Holzmann	Estonia	6.54	6.42	6.49	6.54	707		1430
12	B	Pauls Bertrams Klucis	Latvia	6.33	6.06	x	6.33	659		1336
13	B	Vikas Kaushik	India	x	6.11	5.95	6.11	610		1401
14	B	Matías Iván Brandoni	Argentina	6.08	6.01	5.94	6.08	604		1305

=== Shot put ===
Rank	Group	Athlete	Nationality	#1	#2	#3	Result	Points	Notes	Total
1	A	Alexander Diamond	Australia	13.35	13.89	14.91	14.91	784		2541
2	A	Sutthisak Singkhon	Thailand	x	14.87	x	14.87	782		2504
3	A	Sergio Pandiani	Argentina	12.33	13.17	12.97	13.17	678		2259
4	A	Aaron Booth	New Zealand	12.94	12.96	12.35	12.96	665		2365
5	A	Luca Bernaschina	Switzerland	10.69	12.55	12.40	12.55	640		2258
6	B	Rafał Abramowski	Poland	10.10	12.51	x	12.51	637		2350
7	B	Max Attwell	New Zealand	11.49	10.89	12.16	12.16	616		2255
8	B	Vikas Kaushik	India	10.86	11.60	11.41	11.60	582		1983
9	B	Domantas Dobrega	Lithuania	11.16	x	10.69	11.16	556		2190
10	A	Harry Maslen	Great Britain	10.83	10.67	11.13	11.13	554		2104
11	B	Matías Iván Brandoni	Argentina	x	10.53	10.47	10.53	518		1823
12	B	Mihkel Holzmann	Estonia	x	10.19	x	10.19	497		1927
13	A	Gong Kewei	China	9.95	x	10.03	10.03	487		2202
	B	Pauls Bertrams Klucis	Latvia	x	x	x	NM	0		1336

=== High jump ===
Rank	Group	Athlete	Nationality	1.61	1.64	1.67	1.70	1.73	1.76	1.79	1.82	1.85	1.88	1.91	1.94	1.97	2.00	2.03	Result	Points	Notes	Total
1	B	Max Attwell	New Zealand	–	–	–	–	–	–	–	–	o	–	o	xxo	xo	o	xxx	2.00	803		3058
2	A	Aaron Booth	New Zealand	–	–	–	–	–	–	–	–	o	–	o	o	o	xo	xxx	2.00	803		3168
3	A	Sutthisak Singkhon	Thailand	–	–	–	–	–	–	o	–	o	o	o	o	xo	xxo	?	2.00	803		3307
4	A	Gong Kewei	China	–	–	–	–	–	–	–	o	–	xo	xo	xxo	xxo	xxo	x	2.00	803		3005
5	B	Rafał Abramowski	Poland	–	–	–	o	o	xxo	o	o	o	xo	xxo	o	x–			1.94	749		3099
6	B	Domantas Dobrega	Lithuania	–	–	–	–	–	–	o	o	–	xo	xo	xxx				1.91	723		2913
7	A	Sergio Pandiani	Argentina	–	–	–	–	–	o	–	o	–	xo	xxo	xxx				1.91	723		2982
8	A	Alexander Diamond	Australia	–	–	–	–	–	–	–	o	o	o	xxx					1.88	696		3237
9	B	Mihkel Holzmann	Estonia	–	–	–	xo	o	o	o	xxo	xxo	o	xxx					1.88	696		3237
10	B	Pauls Bertrams Klucis	Latvia	–	–	–	–	–	o	o	o	o	xxo	xxx					1.88	696		2032
11	A	Harry Maslen	Great Britain	–	–	–	–	–	o	–	o	xo	xxx						1.85	670		2774
12	A	Luca Bernaschina	Switzerland	–	–	–	–	–	–	o	–	xxx							1.79	619		2877
13	B	Matías Iván Brandoni	Argentina	–	–	o	o	xo	o	o	xxx								1.79	619		2442
14	B	Vikas Kaushik	India	o	o	o	o	o	xxo	xxo	xxx								1.79	619		2602

=== 400 metres ===
Rank	Heat	Name	Nationality	Time	Points	Notes	Total
1	1	Max Attwell	New Zealand	48.37	891		3949
2	2	Gong Kewei	China	49.16	854		3859
3	2	Aaron Booth	New Zealand	49.77	825		3993
4	1	Domantas Dobrega	Lithuania	49.81	823		3736
5	2	Sergio Pandiani	Argentina	50.04	813		3795
6	2	Harry Maslen	Great Britain	50.06	812		3586
7	2	Sutthisak Singkhon	Thailand	50.86	775		4082
8	1	Mihkel Holzmann	Estonia	51.62	741		3364
9	1	Vikas Kaushik	India	52.05	723		3325
9	2	Alexander Diamond	Australia	52.05	723		3960
11	1	Matías Iván Brandoni	Argentina	56.55	538		2980
12	1	Pauls Bertrams Klucis	Latvia	56.64	535		2567
	1	Rafał Abramowski	Poland	DQ	0	R163.3a	3099
	2	Luca Bernaschina	Switzerland	DNS	0		DNF

=== 110 metres hurdles ===
Wind:
Heat 1: -0.2 m/s, Heat 2: -1.8 m/s

Rank	Heat	Name	Nationality	Time	Points	Notes	Total
1	2	Gong Kewei	China	14.70	886		4745
2	2	Sergio Pandiani	Argentina	15.00	850		4645
3	2	Alexander Diamond	Australia	15.07	841		4801
4	2	Sutthisak Singkhon	Thailand	15.22	823		4905
5	2	Aaron Booth	New Zealand	15.37	805		4798
6	2	Harry Maslen	Great Britain	15.39	803		4389
7	1	Matías Iván Brandoni	Argentina	15.61	777		3757
8	1	Mihkel Holzmann	Estonia	16.05	727		4091
9	1	Max Attwell	New Zealand	16.53	674		4623
10	1	Domantas Dobrega	Lithuania	16.79	646		4382
11	1	Vikas Kaushik	India	17.21	603		3928
12	1	Pauls Bertrams Klucis	Latvia	17.57	566		3133
	1	Rafał Abramowski	Poland	DNS	0		DNF

=== Discus throw ===
Rank	Athlete	Nationality	#1	#2	#3	Result	Points	Notes	Total
1	Alexander Diamond	Australia	45.92	46.52	x	46.52	798		5599
2	Sutthisak Singkhon	Thailand	39.93	39.53	42.01	42.01	706		5611
3	Aaron Booth	New Zealand	39.49	39.12	41.65	41.65	698		5496
4	Sergio Pandiani	Argentina	34.76	38.66	36.44	38.66	637		5282
5	Max Attwell	New Zealand	37.87	x	x	37.87	621		5244
6	Harry Maslen	Great Britain	35.61	34.90	37.18	37.18	607		4996
7	Vikas Kaushik	India	31.17	32.59	36.21	36.21	588		4516
8	Gong Kewei	China	x	x	34.70	34.70	558		5303
9	Mihkel Holzmann	Estonia	33.69	x	30.38	33.69	538		4629
10	Domantas Dobrega	Lithuania	31.37	32.92	32.10	32.92	522		4904
11	Matías Iván Brandoni	Argentina	27.90	31.02	x	31.02	485		4242
12	Pauls Bertrams Klucis	Latvia	27.19	x	30.39	30.39	472		3605

=== Pole vault ===
Rank	Group	Athlete	Nationality	2.70	2.90	3.00	3.10	3.20	3.50	3.60	3.70	3.80	3.90	4.00	4.10	4.20	4.30	4.40	4.50	4.60	4.70	4.80	4.90	Result	Points	Notes	Total
1	A	Alexander Diamond	Australia	–	–	–	–	–	–	–	–	–	–	–	–	o	–	o	xo	xxo	xxo	o	xxx	4.80	849		6448
2	A	Aaron Booth	New Zealand	–	–	–	–	–	–	–	–	–	–	–	–	–	–	o	o	o	o	xxo	xxx	4.80	849		6345
3	A	Max Attwell	New Zealand	–	–	–	–	–	–	–	–	–	–	–	–	o	–	o	o	o	xxo	xxx		4.70	819		6063
4	B	Vikas Kaushik	India	–	–	–	–	–	–	xo	–	xo	o	xxo	xo	o	xo	xxx						4.30	819		6063
5	A	Gong Kewei	China	–	–	–	–	–	–	–	–	o	–	o	–	o	–	xxx						4.20	673		5976
6	B	Sutthisak Singkhon	Thailand	–	–	–	–	–	–	–	–	o	–	o	o	xxx								4.10	645		6256
7	B	Domantas Dobrega	Lithuania	–	–	–	–	–	–	o	–	xo	o	o	xo	xxx								4.10	645		5549
8	B	Mihkel Holzmann	Estonia	–	–	–	–	–	o	–	xo	–	xo	o	xo	xxx								4.10	645		5274
9	B	Sergio Pandiani	Argentina	–	–	–	–	–	o	–	o	o	–	xo	xxo	xxx								4.10	645		5927
10	B	Matías Iván Brandoni	Argentina	o	xo	xo	xo	xxx																3.10	381		4623
	A	Harry Maslen	Great Britain	–	–	–	–	–	–	–	–	–	–	–	–	xxx								NM	0		4996
	B	Pauls Bertrams Klucis	Latvia	–	–	–	–	–	–	–	–	xxx												NM	0		3605

=== Javelin throw ===
Rank	Athlete	Nationality	#1	#2	#3	Result	Points	Notes	Total
1	Aaron Booth	New Zealand	54.45	59.44	60.51	60.51	746		7091
2	Sutthisak Singkhon	Thailand	54.09	x	55.68	55.68	673		6929
3	Sergio Pandiani	Argentina	53.75	55.26	53.12	55.26	667		6594
4	Harry Maslen	Great Britain	49.40	51.68	55.17	55.17	665		6143
5	Domantas Dobrega	Lithuania	50.05	52.31	51.45	52.31	623		6172
6	Max Attwell	New Zealand	46.31	x	50.84	50.84	601		6664
7	Gong Kewei	China	43.64	39.28	50.44	50.44	595		6571
8	Mihkel Holzmann	Estonia	44.67	47.64	50.38	50.38	594		5868
9	Alexander Diamond	Australia	40.56	48.04	46.23	48.04	560		7008
10	Vikas Kaushik	India	45.55	x	34.44	45.55	523		5741
11	Matías Iván Brandoni	Argentina	40.50	37.37	33.70	40.50	449		5072
12	Pauls Bertrams Klucis	Latvia	x	28.29	x	28.29	275		3880

=== 1500 metres ===
Rank	Name	Nationality	Time	Points	Notes
1	Max Attwell	New Zealand	4:28.34	756	
2	Gong Kewei	China	4:30.74	740	
3	Aaron Booth	New Zealand	4:31.38	736	
4	Mihkel Holzmann	Estonia	4:42.94	662	
5	Harry Maslen	Great Britain	4:45.45	646	
6	Domantas Dobrega	Lithuania	4:45.91	644	
7	Vikas Kaushik	India	4:46.92	637	
8	Sergio Pandiani	Argentina	4:51.49	610	
9	Alexander Diamond	Australia	4:55.59	585	
10	Sutthisak Singkhon	Thailand	4:56.16	582	
	Matías Iván Brandoni	Argentina	DNF	0	
	Pauls Bertrams Klucis	Latvia	DNS	0	

=== Final standings ===
The highest mark recorded in each event is highlighted in yellow

Rank	Athlete	Nationality	100m	LJ	SP	HJ	400m	110m H	DT	PV	JT	1500m	Points	Notes
1st place, gold medalist(s)	Aaron Booth	New Zealand	11.09	7.19	12.96	2.00	49.77	15.37	41.65	4.80	60.51	4:31.38	7827	
2nd place, silver medalist(s)	Alexander Diamond	Australia	11.20	7.52	14.91	1.88	52.05	15.07	46.52	4.80	48.04	4:55.59	7593	
3rd place, bronze medalist(s)	Sutthisak Singkhon	Thailand	11.09	7.28	14.87	2.00	50.86	15.22	42.01	4.10	55.68	4:56.16	7511	
4	Max Attwell	New Zealand	11.13	6.97	12.16	2.00	48.37	16.53	37.87	4.70	50.84	4:28.34	7420	
5	Gong Kewei	China	10.98	7.15	10.03	2.00	49.16	14.70	34.70	4.20	50.44	4:30.74	7311	
6	Sergio Pandiani	Argentina	11.20	6.79	13.17	1.91	50.04	15.00	38.66	4.10	55.26	4:51.49	7204	
7	Domantas Dobrega	Lithuania	11.17	6.99	11.16	1.91	49.81	16.79	32.92	4.10	52.31	4:45.91	6816	
8	Mihkel Holzmann	Estonia	11.64	6.54	10.19	1.88	51.62	16.05	33.69	4.10	50.38	4:42.94	6530	
9	Vikas Kaushik	India	11.32	6.11	11.60	1.79	52.05	17.21	36.21	4.30	45.55	4:46.92	6378	
10	Harry Maslen	Great Britain	11.42	6.86	11.13	1.85	50.06	15.39	37.18	NM	55.17	4:45.45	6307	
11	Matías Iván Brandoni	Argentina	11.75	6.08	10.53	1.79	56.55	15.61	31.02	3.10	40.50	DNF	5072	
	Pauls Bertrams Klucis	Latvia	11.87	6.33	NM	1.88	56.64	17.57	30.39	NM	28.29	DNS	DNF	
	Rafał Abramowski	Poland	10.90	7.07	12.51	1.94	DQ	DNS	–	–	–	DNS	DNF	
	Luca Bernaschina	Switzerland	11.39	7.12	12.55	1.79	DNS	–	–	–	–	DNS	DNF	
