= 2023 Asian Athletics Championships – Men's decathlon =

Men's decathlon at the 2023 Asian Athletics Championships
- Venue: National Stadium
- Location: Bangkok, Thailand
- Dates: 12-13 July
- Competitors: 7 from 6 nations
- Winning score: 7745

Medalists
gold medal	Yuma Maruyama	Japan
silver medal	Sutthisak Singkhon	Thailand
bronze medal	Tejaswin Shankar	India

The men's decathlon at the 2023 Asian Athletics Championships was held on 12 and 13 July.

== Records ==
Records before the 2023 Asian Athletics Championships
Record	Athlete (nation)	Points	Location	Date
World record	Kevin Mayer (FRA)	9126	Talence, France	16 September 2018
Asian record	Dmitriy Karpov (KAZ)	8725	Athens, Greece	24 August 2004
Championship record	Dmitriy Karpov (KAZ)	8037	Pune, India	4 July 2013
World leading	Leo Neugebauer (GER)	8836	Austin, United States	8 June 2023
Asian leading	No scores recorded			

== Results ==
=== 100 metres ===
Rank	Lane	Name	Nationality	Time	Points	Notes
1	3	Yuma Maruyama	Japan	11.10	838	
2	4	Sutthisak Singkhon	Thailand	11.14	830	
3	2	Tejaswin Shankar	India	11.30	795	
4	8	Shun Taue	Japan	11.35	784	
5	5	Sun Qihao	China	11.37	780	
6	6	Cho Chia-hsuan	Chinese Taipei	11.40	774	
7	7	Abdul Sajjad Saadoun Nasser	Iraq	11.86	679	
				Wind: (+0.0 m/s)		

=== Long jump ===
Rank	Athlete	Nationality	#1	#2	#3	Result	Points	Notes	Total
1	Tejaswin Shankar	India	7.48	x	7.20	7.48	930		1725
2	Sutthisak Singkhon	Thailand	7.18	7.08	7.33	7.33	893		1723
3	Yuma Maruyama	Japan	7.19	7.30	7.16	7.30	886		1724
4	Sun Qihao	China	7.01	6.76	7.09	7.09	835		1615
5	Shun Taue	Japan	6.95	6.76	6.88	6.95	802		1586
6	Abdul Sajjad Saadoun Nasser	Iraq	6.32	6.64	6.80	6.80	767		1446
7	Cho Chia-hsuan	Chinese Taipei	6.74	x	6.50	6.74	753		1527

=== Shot put ===
Rank	Athlete	Nationality	#1	#2	#3	Result	Points	Notes	Total
1	Sun Qihao	China	14.34	15.03	15.46	15.46	818		2433
2	Sutthisak Singkhon	Thailand	13.06	14.45	14.70	14.70	771		2494
3	Yuma Maruyama	Japan	13.29	13.70	x	13.70	710		2434
4	Tejaswin Shankar	India	12.02	12.39	11.74	12.39	630		2355
5	Shun Taue	Japan	10.57	12.23	12.15	12.23	620		2206
6	Cho Chia-hsuan	Chinese Taipei	11.69	11.73	12.17	12.17	617		2144
7	Abdul Sajjad Saadoun Nasser	Iraq	11.41	11.74	12.10	12.10	612		2058

=== High jump ===
Rank	Athlete	Nationality	1.75	1.78	1.81	1.84	1.87	1.90	1.93	1.96	1.99	2.02	2.05	2.14	Result	Points	Notes	Total
1	Tejaswin Shankar	India	–	–	–	–	–	–	–	o	o	–	o	o	2.14	934		3289
2	Abdul Sajjad Saadoun Nasser	Iraq	–	–	o	–	o	–	o	o	o	xxx			1.99	794		2852
3	Yuma Maruyama	Japan	–	–	–	o	xo	o	xo	xo	xxx				1.96	767		3201
4	Sun Qihao	China	–	–	o	o	–	xo	o	xxx					1.93	740		3173
5	Sutthisak Singkhon	Thailand	–	–	o	o	o	o	xxx						1.90	714		3208
6	Cho Chia-hsuan	Chinese Taipei	o	xo	o	xxo	xxx								1.84	661		2805
7	Shun Taue	Japan	xo	–	xxx										1.75	585		2791

=== 400 metres ===
Rank	Lane	Name	Nationality	Time	Points	Notes	Total
1	7	Tejaswin Shankar	India	49.57	835		4124
2	2	Sutthisak Singkhon	Thailand	49.97	816		4024
3	6	Yuma Maruyama	Japan	50.09	810		4011
4	8	Abdul Sajjad Saadoun Nasser	Iraq	50.58	788		3640
5	4	Shun Taue	Japan	51.12	764		3555
6	3	Cho Chia-hsuan	Chinese Taipei	51.66	740		3545
7	5	Sun Qihao	China	52.10	720		3893

=== 110 metres hurdles ===
Wind: +1.2 m/s

Rank	Lane	Name	Nationality	Time	Points	Notes	Total
1	3	Yuma Maruyama	Japan	14.18	951		4962
2	5	Shun Taue	Japan	14.65	892		4447
3	7	Tejaswin Shankar	India	14.75	880		5004
4	4	Sutthisak Singkhon	Thailand	14.83	870		4894
5	2	Cho Chia-hsuan	Chinese Taipei	15.61	777		4322
6	8	Abdul Sajjad Saadoun Nasser	Iraq	16.10	722		4362
	6	Sun Qihao	China	DNS	0		DNF

=== Discus throw ===
Rank	Athlete	Nationality	#1	#2	#3	Result	Points	Notes	Total
1	Sutthisak Singkhon	Thailand	38.14	42.72	38.87	42.72	720		5614
2	Yuma Maruyama	Japan	34.18	40.19	x	40.19	668		5630
3	Tejaswin Shankar	India	34.62	38.14	35.69	38.14	627		5631
4	Shun Taue	Japan	29.38	34.38	37.01	37.01	604		5051
5	Cho Chia-hsuan	Chinese Taipei	35.15	34.32	33.27	35.15	567		4889
	Abdul Sajjad Saadoun Nasser	Iraq				DNS	0		DNF

=== Pole vault ===
Rank	Athlete	Nationality	3.60	3.80	3.90	4.00	4.10	4.20	4.30	4.40	4.50	4.60	Result	Points	Notes	Total
1	Yuma Maruyama	Japan	–	-	–	–	–	–	o	xo	o	xxx	4.50	760		6390
2	Shun Taue	Japan	–	–	–	–	–	–	o	o	xxx		4.40	731		5782
3	Sutthisak Singkhon	Thailand	–	–	–	o	o	xo	o	o	xxx		4.40	731		6345
4	Cho Chia-hsuan	Chinese Taipei	–	–	o	o	–	xxx					4.00	617		5506
5	Tejaswin Shankar	India	o	o	xxx								3.80	562		6193

=== Javelin throw ===
Rank	Athlete	Nationality	#1	#2	#3	Result	Points	Notes	Total
1	Cho Chia-hsuan	Chinese Taipei	52.39	57.57	58.85	58.85	721		6227
2	Shun Taue	Japan	57.04	55.11	55.89	57.04	693		6475
3	Sutthisak Singkhon	Thailand	56.77	51.66	55.89	56.77	689		7034
4	Yuma Maruyama	Japan	56.68	53.58	54.37	56.68	688		7078
5	Tejaswin Shankar	India	51.08	50.81	52.70	52.70	629	PB	6822

=== 1500 metres ===
Rank	Name	Nationality	Time	Points	Notes
1	Shun Taue	Japan	4:35.03	712	
2	Tejaswin Shankar	India	4:36.18	705	
3	Yuma Maruyama	Japan	4:42.09	667	
4	Cho Chia-hsuan	Chinese Taipei	4:43.32	660	PB
5	Sutthisak Singkhon	Thailand	4:54.51	592	

=== Final standings ===
The highest mark recorded in each event is highlighted in yellow

Rank	Athlete	Nationality	100m	LJ	SP	HJ	400m	110m H	DT	PV	JT	1500m	Points	Notes
1st place, gold medalist(s)	Yuma Maruyama	Japan	11.10	7.30	13.70	1.96	50.09	14.18	40.19	4.50	56.68	4:42.09	7745	
2nd place, silver medalist(s)	Sutthisak Singkhon	Thailand	11.14	7.33	14.70	1.90	49.97	14.83	42.72	4.40	56.77	4:54.51	7626	
3rd place, bronze medalist(s)	Tejaswin Shankar	India	11.30	7.48	12.39	2.14	49.57	14.75	38.14	3.80	52.70	4:36.18	7527	
4	Shun Taue	Japan	11.35	6.95	12.23	1.75	51.12	14.65	37.01	4.40	57.04	4:35.03	7187	
5	Cho Chia-hsuan	Chinese Taipei	11.40	6.74	12.17	1.84	51.66	15.61	35.15	4.00	58.85	4:43.32	6887	
	Abdul Sajjad Saadoun Nasser	Iraq	11.86	6.80	12.10	1.99	50.58	16.10	DNS	–	–	–	DNF	
	Sun Qihao	China	11.37	7.09	15.46	1.93	52.10	DNS	–	–	–	–	DNF	
