= 2017 Asian Athletics Championships – Men's decathlon =

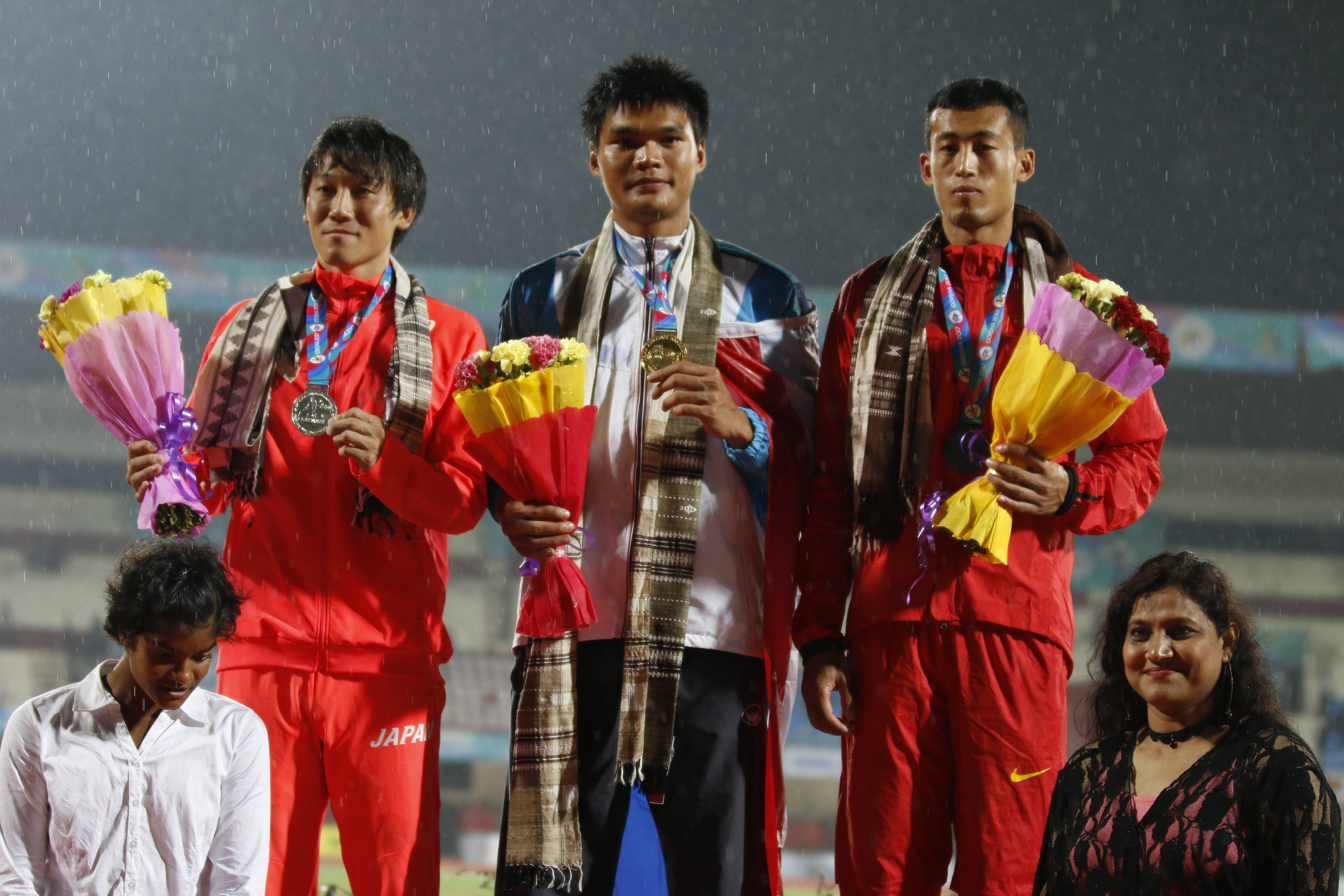
Left-right: Kawasaki, Singkhon, Guo

The men's decathlon event at the 2017 Asian Athletics Championships was held on 6 and 7 July.

== Medalists ==
Gold	Silver	Bronze
Sutthisak Singkhon; Thailand	Kazuya Kawasaki; Japan	Guo Qi; China

== Results ==
=== 100 metres ===
Wind: -0.8 m/s

Rank	Lane	Name	Nationality	Time	Points	Notes
1	7	Kazuya Kawasaki	Japan	10.97	867	
2	5	Sutthisak Singkhon	Thailand	11.03	854	
3	2	Tsuyoshi Shimizu	Japan	11.09	841	
4	3	Majed Radhi Mubarak Al-Sayed	Kuwait	11.48	757	
5	4	Guo Qi	China	11.49	755	
6	8	Mohammed Nahedh	Iraq	11.62	728	
7	6	Abhishek Shetty	India	11.78	695	

=== Long jump ===
Rank	Athlete	Nationality	#1	#2	#3	Result	Points	Notes	Total
1	Sutthisak Singkhon	Thailand	7.70	7.79	7.75	7.79	1007		1861
2	Majed Radhi Mubarak Al-Sayed	Kuwait	7.77	6.76		7.77	1002		1759
3	Tsuyoshi Shimizu	Japan	x	7.47	x	7.47	927		1768
4	Kazuya Kawasaki	Japan	6.82	x	7.34	7.34	896		1763
5	Guo Qi	China	6.94	7.02	6.58	7.02	818		1573
6	Mohammed Nahedh	Iraq	6.32	6.70	5.39	6.70	743		1471
7	Abhishek Shetty	India	x	6.62	x	6.62	725		1420

=== Shot put ===
Rank	Athlete	Nationality	#1	#2	#3	Result	Points	Notes	Total
1	Sutthisak Singkhon	Thailand				14.09	734		2595
2	Abhishek Shetty	India				13.52	699		2119
3	Guo Qi	China				13.15	676		2249
4	Majed Radhi Mubarak Al-Sayed	Kuwait				12.81	656		2415
5	Tsuyoshi Shimizu	Japan				12.20	619		2387
6	Kazuya Kawasaki	Japan				11.48	575		2338
7	Mohammed Nahedh	Iraq				9.62	463		1934

=== High jump ===
Rank	Athlete	Nationality	Result	Points	Notes	Total
1	Kazuya Kawasaki	Japan	2.01	813		3151
2	Sutthisak Singkhon	Thailand	1.98	785		3380
3	Guo Qi	China	1.98	785		3034
4	Majed Radhi Mubarak Al-Sayed	Kuwait	1.95	758		3173
5	Tsuyoshi Shimizu	Japan	1.92	731		3118
6	Abhishek Shetty	India	1.89	705		2824
	Mohammed Nahedh	Iraq	DNS	0		1934

=== 400 metres ===
Rank	Lane	Name	Nationality	Time	Points	Notes	Total
1	6	Sutthisak Singkhon	Thailand	48.70	876		4256
2	2	Majed Radhi Mubarak Al-Sayed	Kuwait	49.17	853		4026
3	8	Kazuya Kawasaki	Japan	49.38	843		3994
4	5	Tsuyoshi Shimizu	Japan	50.33	799		3917
5	4	Guo Qi	China	51.52	746		3780
6	7	Abhishek Shetty	India	52.02	724		3548
	3	Mohammed Nahedh	Iraq	DNS	0		1934

=== 110 metres hurdles ===
Wind: +0.0 m/s

Rank	Lane	Name	Nationality	Time	Points	Notes	Total
1	5	Guo Qi	China	14.77	878		4658
2	8	Sutthisak Singkhon	Thailand	14.80	874		5130
3	6	Majed Radhi Mubarak Al-Sayed	Kuwait	15.16	830		4856
4	3	Tsuyoshi Shimizu	Japan	15.21	824		4741
5	2	Abhishek Shetty	India	15.89	745		4293
6	4	Kazuya Kawasaki	Japan	15.97	736		4730
	7	Mohammed Nahedh	Iraq	DNS	0		1934

=== Discus throw ===
Rank	Athlete	Nationality	#1	#2	#3	Result	Points	Notes	Total
1	Sutthisak Singkhon	Thailand	42.78	x	x	42.78	721		5851
2	Guo Qi	China	41.19	40.58	41.91	41.91	703		5361
3	Abhishek Shetty	India	41.17	x	36.89	41.17	688		4981
4	Kazuya Kawasaki	Japan	36.88	33.46	36.92	36.92	602		5332
5	Majed Radhi Mubarak Al-Sayed	Kuwait	32.69	35.30	32.90	35.30	570		5426
6	Tsuyoshi Shimizu	Japan	35.10	x	29.31	35.10	566		5307
	Mohammed Nahedh	Iraq				DNS	0		1934

=== Pole vault ===
Rank	Athlete	Nationality	3.80	3.90	4.00	4.10	4.20	4.30	4.40	4.50	4.60	4.70	4.80	Result	Points	Notes	Total
1	Guo Qi	China	-	-	-	-	-	-	-	o	-	o	xxx	4.70	819		6180
2	Kazuya Kawasaki	Japan	-	-	-	-	-	-	xo	-	o	xxx		4.60	790		6122
3	R Alzaid	Kuwait	o	-	o	-	xo	xxx						4.20	673		6099
4	Abhishek Shetty	India	o	-	o	-	xxx							4.00	617		5598
5	Sutthisak Singkhon	Thailand	o	o	xxo	xxx								4.00	617		6468
6	Tsuyoshi Shimizu	Japan	-	-	-	-	-	-	xxx					NM	0		5307
	Mohammed Nahedh	Iraq												DNS	0		1934

=== Javelin throw ===
Rank	Jock	Nationality	#1	#2	#3	Result	Points	Notes	Total
1	Kazuya Kawasaki	Japan	53.35	57.58	61.94	61.94	767		6889
2	Sutthisak Singkhon	Thailand	58.50	60.64	57.87	60.64	747		7215
3	Abhishek Shetty	India	57.98	55.08	59.51	59.51	730		6328
4	Guo Qi	China	50.90	52.61	49.63	52.61	627		6807
5	Tsuyoshi Shimizu	Japan	x	x	52.28	52.28	622		5929
6	Majed Radhi Mubarak Al-Sayed	Kuwait	49.67	48.10	49.31	49.67	584		6683
	Mohammed Nahedh	Iraq				DNS	0		1934

=== 1500 metres ===
Rank	Lane	Name	Nationality	Time	Points	Notes	Total
1	4	Majed Radhi Mubarak Al-Sayed	Kuwait	4:27.95	758		7441
2	1	Kazuya Kawasaki	Japan	4:37.72	695		7584
3	7	Guo Qi	China	4:38.73	688		7495
4	5	Abhishek Shetty	India	4:45.18	648		6976
5	3	Tsuyoshi Shimizu	Japan	4:51.07	612		6541
6	2	Sutthisak Singkhon	Thailand	5:07.61	517		7732
7	6	Mohammed Nahedh	Iraq	DNS	0		1934

=== Final standings ===
The highest mark recorded in each event is highlighted in yellow

Rank	Athlete	Nationality	100m	LJ	SP	HJ	400m	110m H	DT	PV	JT	1500m	Points	Notes
1st place, gold medalist(s)	Sutthisak Singkhon	Thailand	11.03	7.79	14.09	1.98	48.70	14.80	42.78	4.00	60.64	5:07.61	7732	
2nd place, silver medalist(s)	Kazuya Kawasaki	Japan	10.97	7.34	11.48	2.01	49.38	15.97	36.92	4.60	61.94	4:37.72	7584	
3rd place, bronze medalist(s)	Guo Qi	China	11.49	7.02	13.15	1.98	51.52	14.77	41.91	4.70	52.61	4:38.73	7495	
4	Majed Radhi Mubarak Al-Sayed	Kuwait	11.48	7.77	12.81	1.95	49.17	15.16	35.30	4.20	49.67	4:27.95	7441	
5	Abhishek Shetty	India	11.78	6.62	13.52	1.89	52.02	15.89	41.17	4.00	59.51	4:45.18	6976	
6	Tsuyoshi Shimizu	Japan	11.09	7.47	12.20	1.92	50.33	15.21	35.10	NM	52.28	4:51.07	6541	
	Mohammed Nahedh	Iraq	11.62	6.70	9.62	DNS	–	–	–	–	–	–	DNF	
