= Tejaswin Shankar =

Indian decathlete (born 1998)

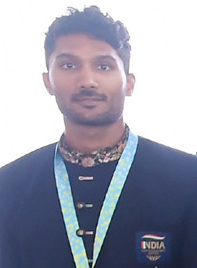
- Shankar in 2022

Personal information
- Nickname: TJ
- Born: 21 December 1998 (age 27) Saket, Delhi, India
- Height: 1.93 m (6 ft 4 in)

Sport
- Sport: Athletics
- Events: Decathlon, Heptathlon, High jump
- College team: Kansas State Wildcats

Achievements and titles
- Personal bests: Decathlon: 8057 NR (2026); Heptathlon: 5993 NR (2026); High jump: 2.29 m (2018)
Medal record
Men's athletics
Representing India
Asian Games
Silver medal – second place	2022 Hangzhou	Decathlon
Bronze medal – third place	2026 Aichi–Nagoya	Decathlon
Asian Championships
Silver medal – second place	2025 Gumi	Decathlon
Bronze medal – third place	2023 Bangkok	Decathlon
Asian Indoor Championships
Gold medal – first place	2026 Tianjin	Heptathlon
Commonwealth Games
Bronze medal – third place	2022 Birmingham	High jump
Bronze medal – third place	2026 Glasgow	Decathlon
South Asian Games
Silver medal – second place	2016 Guwahati	High jump
Commonwealth Youth Games
Gold medal – first place	2015 Apia	High jump

Tejaswin Shankar (born 21 December 1998) is an Indian decathlete. He is the first Indian to win Commonwealth Games medals in high jump and decathlon, claiming bronze in 2022 and 2026, respectively. Shankar has also won silver medals in decathlon at the 2022 Asian Games and the 2025 Asian Championships. He was the NCAA champion in high jump in 2018 and 2022, making him one of the most successful Indian athletes in collegiate circuit.

== Early life ==
Shankar was born on 21 December 1998 in Saket in South Delhi. He studied at the Sardar Patel Vidyalaya, where he played cricket until seventh grade before his physical education teacher suggested he switch to high jump. His father Harishankar, a lawyer for the Board of Control for Cricket in India (BCCI), died of blood cancer in 2014.

== Career ==
Shankar made his international debut in high jump at the 2015 World Youth Championships in Cali, where he finished eighth with a jump of 2.07 m. He won the gold medal at the 2015 Commonwealth Youth Games in Apia, setting a Games record of 2.14 m.

At the 2016 South Asian Games in Guwahati, he won the silver medal with a leap of 2.17 m. At the 2016 Asian Indoor Championships in Doha, he failed to clear the opening height of 2 m and did not record a valid mark. Due to a groin injury, he finished sixth at the 2016 Asian Junior Championships in Ho Chi Minh City with a jump of 2.07 m, and missed the 2016 World U20 Championships. At the age of 17, Shankar rose to prominence when he broke Hari Shankar Roy's 12-year-old national record of 2.25 m, with a jump of 2.26 m at the 2016 Junior National Championships in Coimbatore. He was the third best junior high jumper in the world that year. He was bedridden for six months in 2017 with a slipped disc.

Shankar broke Roy's indoor national record of 2.18 m, with a 2.28 m leap at the 2018 Big 12 Indoor Championships in Ames. He placed sixth at the 2018 Commonwealth Games in Gold Coast, with a jump of 2.24 m.

Shankar, who was not initially selected in the 2022 Commonwealth Games contingent despite meeting the qualification standard, took the Indian Athletics to court and was later brought in as a replacement. He won the bronze medal at the event in Birmingham with a jump of 2.22 m, this was India's first ever high jump medal at the Commonwealth Games.

At the 2023 Asian Championships in Bangkok, he finished seventh in the high jump with a best effort of 2.10 m and won the bronze medal in the decathlon with 7527 points. He placed sixth in the high jump at the World University Games in Chengdu, clearing 2.15 m. Later that year, he won the silver medal in the decathlon at the Asian Games in Hangzhou with a score of 7666 points.

Shankar won the silver medal in the decathlon at the 2025 Asian Championships held in Gumi with a score of 7618 points.

At the 2026 Asian Indoor Championships in Tianjin, Shankar won gold in the heptathlon with a national indoor record score of 5993 points. At the 2026 National Federation Cup in Ranchi, he became the first Indian decathlete to breach the 8000-point barrier, winning the gold medal with a score of 8057 points. At the 2026 Commonwealth Games in Glasgow, he withdrew from the high jump after his opening attempt due to a flared up patellar tendinitis. Despite the injury, he competed in the decathlon two days later and scored 7976 points to win the bronze medal, becoming the first Indian to win a Commonwealth Games medal in the event.

== International competitions ==
Representing India
Year	Competition	Host	Position	Event	Result
2015	World Youth Championships	Cali, Colombia	8th	High jump	2.07 m
2015	Commonwealth Youth Games	Apia, Samoa	1st	High jump	2.14 m
2016	South Asian Games	Guwahati, India	2nd	High jump	2.17 m
2016	Asian Indoor Championships	Doha, Qatar	–	High jump	NM
2016	Asian Junior Championships	Ho Chi Minh City, Vietnam	6th	High jump	2.07 m
2018	Commonwealth Games	Gold Coast, Australia	6th	High jump	2.24 m
2022	Commonwealth Games	Birmingham, England	3rd	High jump	2.22 m
2023	Asian Championships	Bangkok, Thailand	3rd	Decathlon	7527 points
2023	Asian Championships	Bangkok, Thailand	7th	High jump	2.10 m
2023	World University Games	Chengdu, China	6th	High jump	2.15 m
2023	Asian Games	Hangzhou, China	2nd	Decathlon	7666 points
2025	Asian Championships	Gumi, South Korea	2nd	Decathlon	7618 points
2026	Asian Indoor Championships	Tianjin, China	1st	Heptathlon	5993 points
2026	Commonwealth Games	Glasgow, Scotland	–	High jump	NM
2026	Commonwealth Games	Glasgow, Scotland	3rd	Decathlon	7976 points
2026	Asian Games	Nagoya, Japan	3rd	Decathlon	7934 points

=== NCAA Championships ===
Representing the Kansas State Wildcats
Year	Competition	Host	Position	Event	Result
2018	NCAA Championships	Eugene, U.S.	1st	High jump	2.24 m
2019	NCAA Indoor Championships	Birmingham, U.S.	9th	High jump	2.20 m
2019	NCAA Championships	Austin, U.S.	2nd	High jump	2.27 m
2021	NCAA Indoor Championships	Fayetteville, U.S.	3rd	High jump	2.24 m
2021	NCAA Championships	Eugene, U.S.	2nd	High jump	2.23 m
2022	NCAA Indoor Championships	Birmingham, U.S.	6th	High jump	2.20 m
2022	NCAA Championships	Eugene, U.S.	1st	High jump	2.27 m

== Personal bests ==
Information from World Athletics profile unless otherwise noted.

=== Outdoor ===
As of 01 August 2026

Event	Performance	Location	Date	Points
Decathlon	—N/a	Ranchi, India	22–23 May 2026	8057 points
100 metres	10.77 (+0.7 m/s)	Ranchi, India	22 May 2026	912 points
Long jump	7.82m (+1.5 m/s)	Glasgow, Scotland	30 July 2026	1015 points
Shot put	13.98 m (45 ft 10 1/4 in)	San Angelo, U.S.	26 March 2026	727 points
High jump	2.25 m (7 ft 4 1/2 in)	Ranchi, India	22 May 2026	1041 points
400 metres	48.29	Ranchi, India	22 May 2026	895 points
110 metres hurdles	14.23 (+0.2 m/s)	Ranchi, India	23 May 2026	945 points
Discus throw	40.44 m (132 ft 8 in)	Glasgow, Scotland	31 July 2026	674 points
Pole vault	4.35 m (14 ft 3 1/4 in)	San Angelo, U.S.	27 March 2026	716 points
Javelin throw	54.85 m (179 ft 11 1/4 in)	Kochi, India	21 April 2025	661 points
1500 metres	4:29.02	Ranchi, India	23 May 2026	751 points
Virtual Best Performance				8337 points

Event	Performance	Location	Date
High jump	2.29 m (7 ft 6 in)	Lubbock, U.S.	27 April 2018

=== Indoor ===
As of 01 August 2026

Event	Performance	Location	Date	Points
Heptathlon	—N/a	Tianjin, China	7–8 February 2026	5993 points
60 metres	7.11	Tianjin, China	7 February 2026	844 points
Long jump	7.53 m (24 ft 8 1/4 in)	Tianjin, China	7 February 2026	942 points
Shot put	13.63 m (44 ft 8 1/2 in)	Tianjin, China	7 February 2026	706 points
High jump	2.25 m (7 ft 4 1/2 in)	Manhattan, U.S.	29 January 2021	1041 points
60 metres hurdles	8.02	Tianjin, China	8 February 2026	977 points
Pole vault	4.20 m (13 ft 9 1/4 in)	Tianjin, China	8 February 2026	673 points
1000 metres	2:41.22	Manhattan, U.S.	30 January 2021	860 points
Virtual Best Performance				6043 points

Event	Performance	Location	Date
High jump	2.28 m (7 ft 5 3/4 in)	Ames, U.S.	24 February 2018

== Personal life ==
Shankar received a four-year athletics scholarship to Kansas State University in 2017, where he pursued bachelor's and master's degrees in accounting. He briefly worked at Deloitte in the U.S. before leaving the corporate sector to pursue athletics full-time.

He married former Indian sprinter Siddhi Hiray in a private ceremony in 2024. The couple co-founded King's Sports Group, an initiative aimed at helping talented student-athletes to secure sports scholarships in the U.S. collegiate system.

In 2026, Shankar returned to Kansas State University to pursue a master's degree in kinesiology. He made the transition to better prepare for the 2028 Los Angeles Olympics in the U.S. His education is funded through his role as a graduate teaching assistant in the university's kinesiology department, where he teaches biomechanics and introduction to kinesiology.

== Awards ==
- Arjuna Award, 2025
