= Athletics at the 2022 Asian Games – Men's decathlon =

Men's decathlon at the 2022 Asian Games
- Venue: Hangzhou Olympic Expo Main Stadium
- Date: 2–3 October 2023
- Competitors: 7 from 5 nations

Medalists
gold medal	Sun Qihao	China
silver medal	Tejaswin Shankar	India
bronze medal	Yuma Maruyama	Japan

The men's decathlon competition at the 2022 Asian Games took place on 2 and 3 October 2023 at the HOC Stadium, Hangzhou, China.

== Schedule ==
All times are China Standard Time (UTC+08:00)

Date	Time	Event
Monday, 2 October 2023	09:00	100 metres
Monday, 2 October 2023	09:30	Long jump
Monday, 2 October 2023	10:35	Shot put
Monday, 2 October 2023	19:05	High jump
Monday, 2 October 2023	21:10	400 metres
Tuesday, 3 October 2023	09:00	110 metres hurdles
Tuesday, 3 October 2023	09:30	Discus throw
Tuesday, 3 October 2023	10:40	Pole vault
Tuesday, 3 October 2023	19:05	Javelin throw
Tuesday, 3 October 2023	20:40	1500 metres

== Records ==
Prior to this competition, the existing world, Asian and Games records were as follows.

World Record	Kevin Mayer (FRA)	9126	Talence, France	16 September 2018
Asian Record	Dmitriy Karpov (KAZ)	8725	Athens, Greece	24 August 2004
Games Record	Dmitriy Karpov (KAZ)	8384	Doha, Qatar	11 December 2006

== Results ==
Legend

- DNF — Did not finish
- DNS — Did not start
- r — Retired

=== 100 metres ===
- Wind: +1.0 m/s

Rank	Athlete	Time	Points	Notes
1	Yuma Maruyama (JPN)	10.96	870	
2	Wang Chen-yu (TPE)	11.06	847	
3	Shun Taue (JPN)	11.08	843	
4	Tejaswin Shankar (IND)	11.12	834	
5	Cho Chia-hsuan (TPE)	11.14	830	
6	Sutthisak Singkhon (THA)	11.15	827	
7	Sun Qihao (CHN)	11.23	810	

=== Long jump ===
Rank	Athlete	Attempt			Result	Points	Notes
Rank	Athlete	1	2	3	Result	Points	Notes
1	Tejaswin Shankar (IND)	7.37 −0.1	7.23 +1.9	7.32 +0.4	7.37	903	
2	Sutthisak Singkhon (THA)	7.20 −0.3	X	7.29 +0.6	7.29	883	
3	Sun Qihao (CHN)	5.15 +0.3	7.10 +0.2	7.26 −1.0	7.26	876	
4	Yuma Maruyama (JPN)	7.00 −0.3	7.20 +1.0	7.15 −0.8	7.20	862	
5	Cho Chia-hsuan (TPE)	6.82 +0.2	7.01 +0.5	X	7.01	816	
6	Wang Chen-yu (TPE)	6.68 −0.1	7.00 +0.8	6.97 +0.2	7.00	814	
7	Shun Taue (JPN)	6.77 −0.7	X	6.71 +0.2	6.77	760	

=== Shot put ===
Rank	Athlete	Attempt			Result	Points	Notes
Rank	Athlete	1	2	3	Result	Points	Notes
1	Sun Qihao (CHN)	14.85	15.15	X	15.15	799	
2	Wang Chen-yu (TPE)	14.58	14.65	14.94	14.94	786	
3	Sutthisak Singkhon (THA)	13.84	13.37	14.12	14.12	736	
4	Yuma Maruyama (JPN)	12.99	13.61	12.92	13.61	704	
5	Tejaswin Shankar (IND)	13.39	13.26	12.88	13.39	691	
6	Shun Taue (JPN)	12.39	12.65	X	12.65	646	
7	Cho Chia-hsuan (TPE)	11.13	X	11.40	11.40	570	

=== High jump ===
Rank	Athlete	Attempt										Result	Points	Notes
Rank	Athlete	1.70	1.73	1.76	1.79	1.82	1.85	1.88	1.91	1.94	1.97	Result	Points	Notes
Rank	Athlete	2.00	2.03	2.06	2.09	2.12	2.15	2.18	2.21	2.24		Result	Points	Notes
1	Tejaswin Shankar (IND)	–	–	–	–	–	–	–	–	–	O	2.21	1002	
1	Tejaswin Shankar (IND)	–	O	–	O	O	XO	O	XXO	Xr		2.21	1002	
2	Sun Qihao (CHN)	–	–	–	–	–	XO	O	O	O	XO	1.97	776	
2	Sun Qihao (CHN)	XXX										1.97	776	
3	Sutthisak Singkhon (THA)	–	–	–	–	O	O	XO	XO	XXO	XXX	1.94	749	
4	Wang Chen-yu (TPE)	–	–	–	–	–	O	–	XXO	r		1.91	723	
5	Cho Chia-hsuan (TPE)	–	–	O	O	O	XO	O	XXX			1.88	696	
6	Yuma Maruyama (JPN)	–	–	–	–	–	O	–	XXX			1.85	670	
7	Shun Taue (JPN)	–	–	–	O	XO	XXX					1.82	644	

=== 400 metres ===
Rank	Athlete	Time	Points	Notes
1	Tejaswin Shankar (IND)	49.67	830	
2	Sutthisak Singkhon (THA)	50.12	809	
3	Yuma Maruyama (JPN)	50.89	774	
4	Shun Taue (JPN)	50.97	770	
5	Sun Qihao (CHN)	51.45	749	
6	Cho Chia-hsuan (TPE)	51.48	748	
—	Wang Chen-yu (TPE)	DNS		

=== 110 metres hurdles ===
- Wind: +0.8 m/s

Rank	Athlete	Time	Points	Notes
1	Yuma Maruyama (JPN)	14.08	964	
2	Shun Taue (JPN)	14.51	910	
3	Cho Chia-hsuan (TPE)	14.55	905	
4	Sun Qihao (CHN)	14.76	879	
5	Tejaswin Shankar (IND)	14.78	876	
6	Sutthisak Singkhon (THA)	15.57	782	

=== Discus throw ===
Rank	Athlete	Attempt			Result	Points	Notes
Rank	Athlete	1	2	3	Result	Points	Notes
1	Sun Qihao (CHN)	42.85	X	42.30	42.85	723	
2	Sutthisak Singkhon (THA)	40.88	X	38.47	40.88	682	
3	Tejaswin Shankar (IND)	36.54	39.28	38.04	39.28	650	
4	Cho Chia-hsuan (TPE)	34.57	38.74	X	38.74	639	
5	Shun Taue (JPN)	33.19	36.79	34.51	36.79	600	
6	Yuma Maruyama (JPN)	34.80	X	X	34.80	560	

=== Pole vault ===
Rank	Athlete	Attempt										Result	Points	Notes
Rank	Athlete	3.80	3.90	4.00	4.10	4.20	4.30	4.40	4.50	4.60	4.70	Result	Points	Notes
Rank	Athlete	4.80	4.90	5.00	5.10							Result	Points	Notes
1	Sun Qihao (CHN)	–	–	–	–	–	–	–	–	–	XO	5.00	910	
1	Sun Qihao (CHN)	–	O	O	XXX							5.00	910	
2	Yuma Maruyama (JPN)	–	–	–	–	–	–	O	O	XO	XO	4.70	819	
2	Yuma Maruyama (JPN)	XXX										4.70	819	
3	Shun Taue (JPN)	–	–	–	–	O	O	XO	XXX			4.40	731	
4	Sutthisak Singkhon (THA)	–	–	O	O	XO	O	XXX				4.30	702	
5	Cho Chia-hsuan (TPE)	O	–	O	–	O	XXX					4.20	673	
6	Tejaswin Shankar (IND)	XO	XO	O	XXO	XXX						4.10	645	

=== Javelin throw ===
Rank	Athlete	Attempt			Result	Points	Notes
Rank	Athlete	1	2	3	Result	Points	Notes
1	Sun Qihao (CHN)	64.41	62.36	r	64.41	804	
2	Cho Chia-hsuan (TPE)	54.24	57.18	58.94	58.94	722	
3	Yuma Maruyama (JPN)	53.49	57.30	53.48	57.30	697	
4	Shun Taue (JPN)	55.89	55.19	54.11	55.89	676	
5	Tejaswin Shankar (IND)	50.84	49.43	51.17	51.17	606	
6	Sutthisak Singkhon (THA)	48.53	X	X	48.53	567	

=== 1500 metres ===
Rank	Athlete	Time	Points	Notes
1	Shun Taue (JPN)	4:38.27	691	
2	Cho Chia-hsuan (TPE)	4:44.63	651	
3	Yuma Maruyama (JPN)	4:45.17	648	
4	Tejaswin Shankar (IND)	4:48.32	629	
5	Sutthisak Singkhon (THA)	5:10.24	502	
6	Sun Qihao (CHN)	5:12.50	490	

=== Summary ===
Rank	Athlete	100m	LJ	SP	HJ	400m	110mH	DT	PV	JT	1500m	Total	Notes
1st place, gold medalist(s)	Sun Qihao (CHN)	810	876	799	776	749	879	723	910	804	490	7816	
2nd place, silver medalist(s)	Tejaswin Shankar (IND)	834	903	691	1002	830	876	650	645	606	629	7666	
3rd place, bronze medalist(s)	Yuma Maruyama (JPN)	870	862	704	670	774	964	560	819	697	648	7568	
4	Shun Taue (JPN)	843	760	646	644	770	910	600	731	676	691	7271	
5	Cho Chia-hsuan (TPE)	830	816	570	696	748	905	639	673	722	651	7250	
6	Sutthisak Singkhon (THA)	827	883	736	749	809	782	682	702	567	502	7239	
—	Wang Chen-yu (TPE)	847	814	786	723	DNS						DNF	
