= Yuma Maruyama =

Japanese decathlete

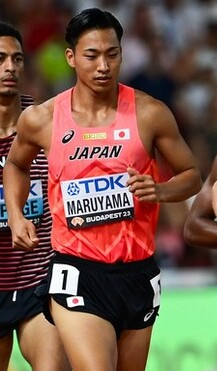
- Maruyama in 2023

Personal information
- Born: 3 June 1998 (age 28)

Sport
- Sport: Athletics
- Events: Decathlon, Heptathlon

Achievements and titles
- Personal bests: Heptathlon: 5901 (2025)NR; Decathlon 8321 (2026)
Medal record
Men's athletics
Representing Japan
Asian Games
Gold medal – first place	2026 Aichi–Nagoya	Decathlon
Bronze medal – third place	2022 Hangzhou	Decathlon
Asian Athletics Championships
Gold medal – first place	2023 Bangkok	Decathlon
Asian Indoor Championships
Gold medal – first place	2023 Astana	Heptathlon
Gold medal – first place	2024 Tehran	Heptathlon
Bronze medal – third place	2026 Tianjin	Heptathlon

Yuma Maruyama (born 3 June 1998) is a Japanese multi-event athlete. He set a new Japanese national record in heptathlon in 2025 and in the decathlon in 2026, and won the gold medal in decathlon at the 2026 Asian Games.

== Early and personal life ==
Maruyama was born in Osaka and graduated from Osaka Prefectural Shinoda Senior High School and Nihon University.

== Career ==
Maruyama was a bronze medalist at the 2022 Asian Games in Hangzhou in the decathlon.

Maruyama was a gold medalist in the heptathlon at the 2023 Asian Indoor Athletics Championships in Kazakhstan with 5,801 points. He was a gold medalist in the decathlon at the 2023 Asian Athletics Championships in Bangkok, with a total of 7,745 points. He competed at the 2023 World Athletics Championships in Budapest in the decathlon.

Maruyama was a gold medalist in the heptathlon at the 2024 Asian Indoor Athletics Championships in Tehran, Iran, winning six of the seven events. He won the decathlon at the Japanese Athletics Championships in 2023 and 2024 and set a personal best of 8,021 points for decathlon to move to third on Japan’s all-time list.

With a score of 5901 points he set a new national record in the indoor heptathlon in Tallinn in February 2025. He was selected for the 2025 World Athletics Indoor Championships in Nanjing in March 2025. Competing at the 2025 Asian Championships in May, he was scoring well but had a freak accident, hitting his head in the hurdles race and was unable to complete the decathlon. Later that year, he was able to secure his second ever score over 8000 in Nagano.

In February 2026, he won the bronze medal in the heptathlon at the 2026 Asian Indoor Athletics Championships in Tianjin, China. Competing at the Mt. SAC Relays in California in April 2026, be broke the Japanese record for decathlon set 14 years previously by Keisuke Ushiro. In September, Maruyama won the gold medal in decathlon with 8123 points at the 2026 Asian Games.
