= Sammy Ball =

English decathlete (born 2004)

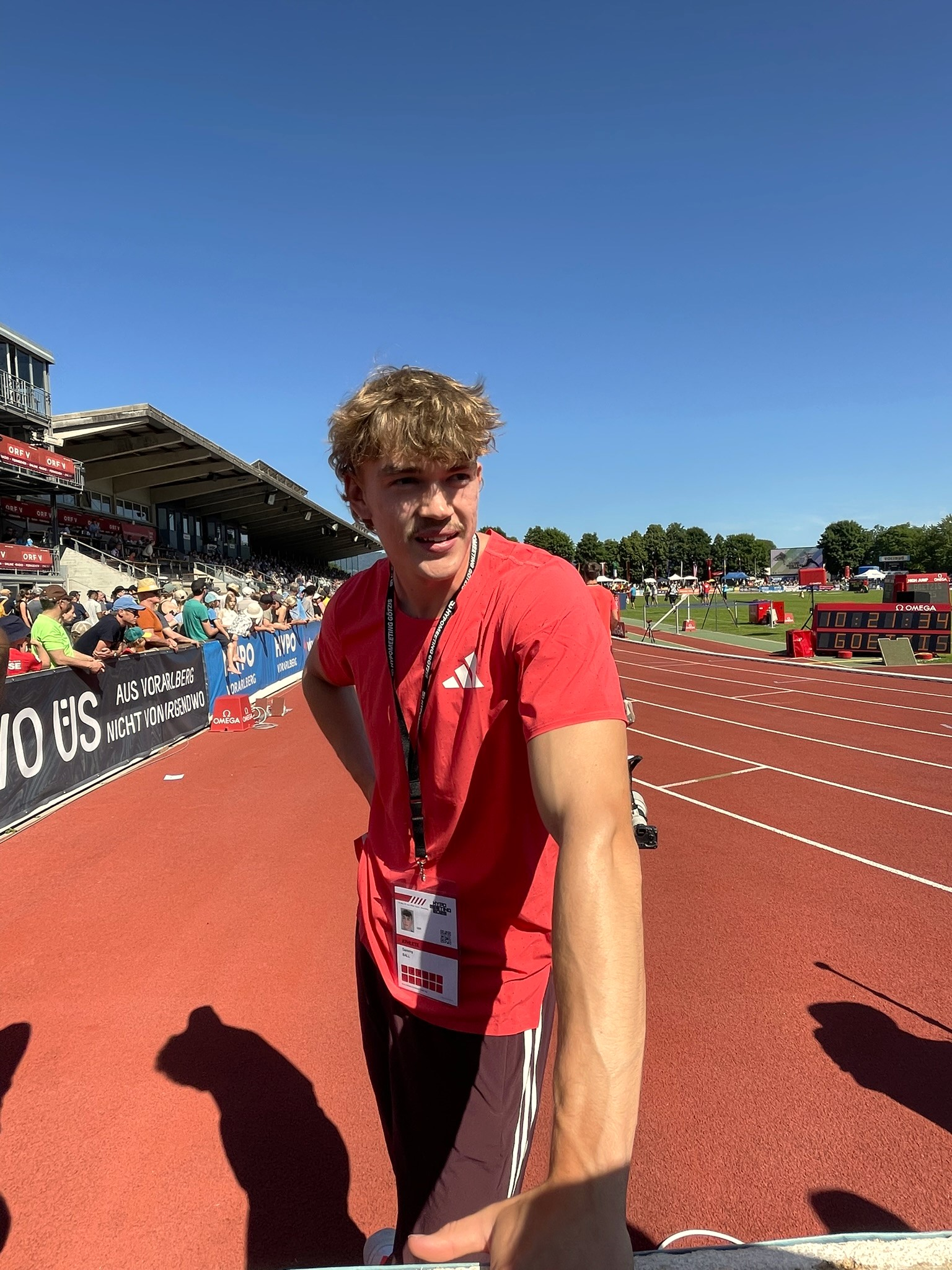
- Ball in Götzis (2025)

Personal information
- Nationality: British (English)
- Born: 18 October 2004 (age 21) Wargrave, England

Sport
- Sport: Athletics
- Event: Decathlon
- Club: Reading AC
- Coached by: Rafer Joseph

Achievements and titles
- Personal bests: Decathlon: 8,100 (2025); Heptathlon: 5,849 (2026)

Sammy Ball (born 18 October 2004) is a British decathlete.

== Biography ==
Ball began competing in athletics at the age of nine. He is a graduate of The Piggott School and then went on to study sports science at the Berkshire College of Agriculture.

Sammy is currently a full-time athlete and part-time athletics coach.

In May 2023, he achieved the British under-20 record in the decathlon, with a score of 7,870 points.

Ball is two-time the British decathlon champion after winning the 2024 British Athletics Championships titles in 2024, whilst still an teenager, and 2026.

In 2026, at the age of 21, at the Scotstoun Stadium, Glasgow, Ball finished in fourth position at the Commonwealth Games decathlon.

With a decathlon personal best of 8,100 points, Ball is currently ranked seventh in the British all-time rankings.

== Personal bests ==
Outdoor

As of 7 July 2025

Individual events
Event	Performance	Location	Date
100 metres	10.92 (-3.3 m/s)	Bracknell	11 May 2025
200 metres	21.48 (−0.4 m/s)	Cardiff	29 June 2025
300 metres	33.95	Windsor	16 April 2023
400 metres	49.32	Eton	2 April 2022
110m hurdles	14.6	Swansea	1 June 2024
Long jump	7.57 m (24 ft 10 in) (+1.5 m/s)	Chelmsford	26 May 2025
High jump	1.95 m (6 ft 4 3/4 in)	Eton	16 April 2023
Pole vault	4.70 m (15 ft 5 in)	Basingstoke	5 July 2025
Discus throw	43.56 m (142 ft 10 3/4 in)	Basingstoke	5 July 2025
Javelin throw	46.71 m (153 ft 2 3/4 in)	Bracknell	11 May 2025

Combined events
Event	Performance	Location	Date	Points
Decathlon	—N/a	Götzis	31 May–1 June 2025	8,100 points
100 metres	10.55 (+0.7 m/s)	Götzis	31 May 2025	963 points
Long jump	7.41 m (24 ft 3 1/2 in) (−0.6 m/s)	Götzis	31 May 2025	913 points
Long jump	7.49 m (24 ft 6 3/4 in) (+3.9 m/s)	Glasgow	30 July 2026	—N/a
Shot put	15.17 m (49 ft 9 in)	Birmingham	27 July 2024	800 points
High jump	2.03 m (6 ft 7 3/4 in)	Manchester	27 May 2023	831 points
400 metres	47.29	Götzis	31 May 2025	944 points
110m hurdles	14.62 (+1.9 m/s)	Bedford	5 July 2026	896 points
110m hurdles	14.61 (+2.2 m/s)	Glasgow	31 July 2026	—N/a
Discus throw	42.63 m (139 ft 10 1/4 in)	Birmingham	28 July 2024	718 points
Pole vault	4.60 m (15 ft 1 in)	Milos	12 May 2024	790 points
Javelin throw	53.07 m (174 ft 1 1/4 in)	Talence	15 September 2024	634 points
1500 metres	4:18.12	Götzis	1 June 2025	824 points
Virtual Best Performance				8,313 points

Indoor

As of 23 April 2026

Individual events
Event	Performance	Location	Date
Long jump	7.11 m (23 ft 3 3/4 in)	London	1 February 2025
High jump	1.90 m (6 ft 2 3/4 in)	London	6 February 2022
60 metres	7.05	London	3 February 2024
200 metres	22.48	Glasgow	4 December 2021
60m hurdles	8.21	Cardiff	19 December 2021
Shot put	13.92 m (45 ft 8 in)	London	1 February 2025

Combined events
Event	Performance	Location	Date	Points
Heptathlon	—N/a	Glasgow	28 February 2026 – 1 March 2026	5,849 points
60 metres	6.98	Sheffield	18 January 2025	889 points
Long jump	7.23 m (23 ft 8 1/2 in)	Glasgow	28 February 2026	869 points
Shot put	14.83 m (48 ft 7 3/4 in)	Glasgow	28 February 2026	779 points
High jump	1.97 m (6 ft 5 1/2 in)	Stockholm	15 February 2025	776 points
60m hurdles	8.34	Sheffield	19 January 2025	898 points
Pole vault	4.62 m (15 ft 1 3/4 in)	Stockholm	16 February 2025	796 points
1000 metres	2:38.32	Glasgow	1 March 2026	892 points
Virtual Best Performance				5,899 points
