= Jami Schlueter =

Nigerian decathlete (born 2002)

Personal information
- Born: 26 October 2002 (age 23)

Sport
- Sport: Athletics
- Event: Decathlon

Achievements and titles
- Personal bests: Decathlon: 8024 (2026) NR; Heptathlon: 5871 (2026) NR

Jami Schlueter (born 26 October 2002) is a Nigerian multi-event athlete. He is the Nigerian national record holder in decathlon and heptathlon.

== Biography ==
Born in Germany to a Nigerian mother and German father, he has family in Ekiti State. Schlueter grew up in the Middle East and England, completing his secondary school at Millfield in Somerset, where he served as head boy and captain of athletics. He started competing in combined events between 2014 and 2016, transitioning from quadrathlon to pentathlon and to decathlon. He later studied in the United States, competing for the University of Washington.

Schlueter placed tenth in decathlon at the 2024 NCAA Championships with 7739 points in June 2024. The following month, Schlueter placed third in decathlon at the 2024 British Athletics Championships in Birmingham with 7452 points.

He won the Big Ten Conference silver medals for Washington in both the heptathlon and decathlon in 2025, and set a new personal best of 5,780 points in the heptathlon at the UW Invitational in Seattle that year. He graduated in 2025, having studied psychology and sociology.

On 13 November 2025, Schlueter became eligible to represent Nigeria having applied to change his allegiance from Great Britain. In February 2026, Schlueter set a new Nigerian national record in the heptathlon with a tally of 5,789 points at the Texas A&M Charlie Thomas Invitational, competing for the University of Washington, breaking the previous record of 4,859 set by Chukwuma Maduka in 2018. He then improved his personal best and the national record with 5871 points at the US National Indoor Championships in Indianapolis on 22 February 2026.

Schlueter set a new Nigerian national record in the decathlon with a score of 7861 points at the 2026 Mt. SAC Relays, breaking the 2017 record from Peter Moreno. He broke the 8000 points barrier in decathlon for the first time in June 2026 in Dallas, Texas, scoring a tally of 8024 points. He placed seventh in decathlon at the 2026 Commonwealth Games in Glasgow, Scotland.

== Personal life ==
While a student at the University of Washington, he served as the university's Black Student Athlete Association President, with the university winning a National Award for Black Student Athlete Organisations. Alongside his athletics, he has worked as a Business Development and Project Management consultant.
