= Callum Newby =

British athlete

Personal information
- Nationality: British (Scottish)
- Born: 16 June 2002 (age 24)

Sport
- Sport: Athletics
- Event: Multi-event

Achievements and titles
- Personal bests: Heptathlon: 5731 (Glasgow, 2026); Decathlon 7441 (Birmingham, 2025)

Callum Newby (born 16 June 2002) is a Scottish multi-event athlete. He is the Scottish record holder in the indoors heptathlon and won the Decathlon at the 2025 UK Athletics Championships.

== Biography ==
Newby is a member of Edinburgh Athletics Club and in 2018 became a Scottish National Academy athlete.

Newby placed second in the U20 indoor heptathlon at the 2020 England Athletics Indoor Combined Events Championships with a points tally of 5224, an overall personal best. Newby won the U20 decathlon at the England Athletics Combined Events Championships in May 2021.

Competing indoors in heptathlon at the 2022 England Athletics Indoor Combined Events Championships, he finished fifth overall in the seniors event and won the U23 age-group, with a points tally of 5275 points for a new personal best.

Newby won the 2025 English Athletics Combined Events Championships, incorporated into the British National Championships, with a personal best score of 7441 points in July 2025.

On 1 March in Glasgow, Newby set a Scottish record of 5731 points at the British Indoor Combined Events Championship.

Newby was named in the Scottish team for the 2026 Commonwealth Games in Glasgow and set a new Scottish native record of 7723 points, placing sixth overall.
