= 2024 World Athletics U20 Championships – Men's 4 × 100 metres relay =

Men's 4 × 100 metres relay at the 2024 World Athletics U20 Championships
- Venue: Estadio Atlético de la VIDENA
- Dates: 30 August 2024 (heats); 31 August 2024 (final)
- Competitors: 125 from 30 nations
- Winning time: 39.18

Medalists
gold medal	Jace Witter; Gary Card; Nyrone Wade; Deandre Daley	Jamaica
silver medal	Jake Odey-Jordan; Joel Masters; Dean Patterson; Teddy Wilson; Fabian Powell*	Great Britain
bronze medal	Wirayut Daenkhanob; Sarawut Nuansi; Chutithat Pruksorranan; Puripol Boonson	Thailand

The men's 4 × 100 metres relay at the 2024 World Athletics U20 Championships was held at the Estadio Atlético de la VIDENA in Lima, Peru on 30 and 31 August 2024.

== Records ==
U20 standing records prior to the 2024 World Athletics U20 Championships were as follows:

Record	Nation	Mark	Location	Date
World U20 Record	South Africa	38.51	Nairobi, Kenya	22 August 2021
Championship Record	South Africa	38.51	Nairobi, Kenya	22 August 2021
World U20 Leading	United States	38.23	Gainesville, United States	30 March 2024

== Results ==
=== Heats ===
First 1 of each heat (Q) plus 4 fastest times (q) qualify to Final.

==== Heat 1 ====
Rank	Lane	Nation	Athletes	Time	Notes
1	6	South Korea	Kim Jeong-yoon, Nwamadi Joel-jin, Kim Dong-jin, Hwang Eui-chan	39.71	Q, NU20R
2	2	France	Gaël Delaumenie, Ylann Bizasene, Dejan Ottou, Hugo Jacquet-Dzong	39.73	q, SB
3	8	Australia	Cody Hasler, Frankleen Newah-Jarfoi, Archer McHugh, Sebastian Sultana	39.80	q
4	3	Spain	Carlos Dorado, Jorge Hernández, Rodrigo Fito, Alejandro Rueda	40.21	
5	7	Grenada	Shaquane Toussaint, Emilio Bishop, Ethan Sam, Samuel Green	40.63	NU20R
–	4	Switzerland	Marc Hofer, Jonathan Gou Gomez, Fionn Bolliger, Kevin Ray	DNF	
–	5	South Africa	Tshepo Tyantini, Bertie Cruywagen, Bradley Nkoana, Neo Modibe	DQ	TR24.7[L]

==== Heat 2 ====
Rank	Lane	Nation	Athletes	Time	Notes
1	5	Hong Kong	Chan Yat Lok, King Yip, Kwok Chun Ting, James Chan	39.97	Q
2	3	Sri Lanka	Malith Thamel, Dineth Weeraratna, Indusara Rajamuni, Merone Wijesinghe	40.14	
3	2	China	Kong Peng, He Jinxian, Huang Youchao, Zeng Keli	40.18	
4	4	Zimbabwe	Brendon Muvimi, David Nyamufarira, Caledon Ruwende, Panashe Nhenga	40.40	NU20R
5	7	Finland	László Merényi, Kalle Hirvi, Alexander Mitchell, Juho Venäläinen	40.46	SB
6	9	Peru	Paolo Silva, Aron Earl, Adrian Alonso, Mariano Fioleduardo	41.80	SB
–	6	Brazil	Matheus Geronimo, Wesley Dionisio, Joao Santini, Ryan De Souza	DNF	
–	8	United States	Brayden Williams, James Bauman, Braylon Thompson, Cordial Vann	DNF	

==== Heat 3 ====
Rank	Lane	Nation	Athletes	Time	Notes
1	8	Thailand	Wirayut Daenkhanob, Sarawut Nuansi, Chutithat Pruksorranan, Puripol Boonson	39.56	Q, NU20R
2	2	Great Britain	Fabian Powell, Joel Masters, Dean Patterson, Teddy Wilson	39.75	q, SB
3	5	Germany	Maximilian Achhammer, Noah Müller, Felix Schulze, Milian Zirbus	40.06	
4	6	Czech Republic	Jakub Toužín, Filip Vojáček, Jiří Synek, Dominik Mráček	40.41	
5	9	Canada	Isaac Chandra, Pishon Haughton, Junior Imoukhuede, Keon Rude	40.70	SB
6	7	Chile	Nicolas Daudet, Benjamin Aravena, Tomas Leon, Raimundo Velasco	41.62	
7	3	Bulgaria	Radostin Milenov, Nikola Karamanolov, Hristivan Kasabov, Hristo Iliev	41.92	SB
–	4	Japan	Fukuto Komuro, Kei Wakana, Katsuki Sato, Naoki Nishioka	DQ	TR24.7[L]

==== Heat 4 ====
Rank	Lane	Nation	Athletes	Time	Notes
1	9	Jamaica	Jace Witter, Gary Card, Nyrone Wade, Deandre Daley	39.54	Q, SB
2	7	Trinidad and Tobago	Che Wickham, Kadeem Chinapoo, Hakeem Chinapoo, Dylan Woodruffe	39.77	q, SB
3	2	Nigeria	Caleb John, Caleb Joshua, Oseiwe Salami, Chidera Ezeakor	40.28	SB
4	3	Denmark	Valentin Jensen, Hector Wandt, Eiri Glerfoss, Sophus Ramsgaard Jensen	40.31	SB
5	4	Mexico	Eduardo Loya, Alejandro Cardenas, Jonathan Padilla, Rafael Buelna	40.34	NU20R
6	6	Italy	Fabrizio Caporusso, Mattia Silvestrelli, Eduardo Longobardi, Daniele Inzoli	40.44	SB
7	5	Poland	Michał Gorzkowicz, Sebastian Libura, Tomasz Bajraszewski, Adrian Lepionka	40.99	
–	8	Ecuador		DNS	

=== Final ===
Rank	Lane	Nation	Athletes	Time	Notes
1st place, gold medalist(s)	7	Jamaica	Jace Witter, Gary Card, Nyrone Wade, Deandre Daley	39.18	SB
2nd place, silver medalist(s)	4	Great Britain	Jake Odey-Jordan, Joel Masters, Dean Patterson, Teddy Wilson	39.20	SB
3rd place, bronze medalist(s)	8	Thailand	Wirayut Daenkhanob, Sarawut Nuansi, Chutithat Pruksorranan, Puripol Boonson	39.39	NU20R
4	9	France	Gaël Delaumenie, Ylann Bizasene, Dejan Ottou, Hugo Jacquet-Dzong	39.43	
5	2	Australia	Frankleen Newah-Jarfoi, Sebastian Sultana, Zachary Della Rocca, Gout Gout	39.64	
6	6	South Korea	Kim Jeong-yoon, Nwamadi Joel-jin, Kim Dong-jin, Na Hyun-joo	39.80	
7	3	Trinidad and Tobago	Che Wickham, Kadeem Chinapoo, Hakeem Chinapoo, Dylan Woodruffe	39.99	
8	5	Hong Kong	Chan Yat Lok, Magnus Johannsson, Kwok Chun Ting, James Chan	40.26	
