= 2024 World Athletics U20 Championships – Men's 100 metres =

Men's 100 metres at the 2024 World Athletics U20 Championships
- Venue: Estadio Atlético de la VIDENA
- Dates: 27 August 2024 (heats & semi-finals); 28 August 2024 (final)
- Competitors: 64 from 45 nations
- Winning time: 10.19

Medalists
gold medal	Bayanda Walaza	South Africa
silver medal	Puripol Boonson	Thailand
bronze medal	Bradley Nkoana	South Africa

The men's 100 metres at the 2024 World Athletics U20 Championships was held at the Estadio Atlético de la VIDENA in Lima, Peru on 27 and 28 August 2024.

== Records ==
Records before the 2024 World Athletics U20 Championships
Record	Athlete (nation)	Time (s)	Location	Date
World U20 Record	Letsile Tebogo (BOT)	9.91	Cali, Colombia	2 August 2022
Championship Record	Letsile Tebogo (BOT)	9.91	Cali, Colombia	2 August 2022
World U20 Leading	Christian Miller (USA)	9.93	Clermont, United States	20 April 2024

== Results ==
=== Heats ===
Heats took place on 27 August, with the 66 athletes involved being split into 8 heats, 6 heats of 8 and 2 of 9 athletes. The first 2 athletes in each heat (Q) and the next 8 fastest (q) qualified to the semi-finals.

==== Heat 1 ====
Rank	Lane	Athlete	Nation	Time	Notes
1	5	Puripol Boonson	Thailand	10.41	Q
2	3	Joel-jin Nwamadi	South Korea	10.50 [.491]	Q
3	2	Adas Dambrauskas	Lithuania	10.50 [.499]	q
4	4	David Landim	Portugal	10.59	
5	8	Jacob Kemminer	Germany	10.61	
6	9	Zalán Deák	Hungary	10.64	
7	6	Mrutyam Dondapati	India	10.65	SB
8	7	Brandon Pemberton	United States Virgin Islands	10.92	
				Wind: (−0.5 m/s)	

==== Heat 2 ====
Rank	Lane	Athlete	Nation	Time	Notes
1	4	Bayanda Walaza	South Africa	10.28	Q
2	2	Sebastian Sultana	Australia	10.44	Q
3	8	Valentin Jensen (Note: Valentin Jensen did not originally qualify for the semi-finals however due to Okon Sunday sustaining an injury and opting to take no further part in the competition Jensen was placed in to Heat 1 of the semi-finals.)	Denmark	10.56	q
4	9	Kim Jeong-yoon	South Korea	10.60	
5	3	Adem Benyache	Algeria	10.71	
6	7	Aidil Hajam	Malaysia	10.89	
7	6	Chidera Ezeakor	Nigeria	10.92	
8	5	Tomás Mondino	Argentina	11.06	
				Wind: (+0.3 m/s)	

==== Heat 3 ====
Rank	Lane	Athlete	Nation	Time	Notes
1	3	Teddy Wilson	Great Britain	10.29	Q, SB
2	6	He Jinxian	China	10.32	Q
3	2	Hristo Iliev	Bulgaria	10.53	q
4	7	Kwok Chun Ting	Hong Kong	10.65	
5	8	Aron Earl	Peru	10.70	
6	5	Tomasz Bajraszewski	Poland	10.72	
7	9	Norre Robinson	Bermuda	10.99	
8	4	Jeremiah Adderley	Bahamas	11.06	
				Wind: (+0.5 m/s)	

==== Heat 4 ====
Rank	Lane	Athlete	Nation	Time	Notes
1	2	Okon Sunday	Nigeria	10.48	Q
2	6	Merone Wijesinghe	Sri Lanka	10.55	Q
3	8	Jaden Wiley	United States	10.59	
4	7	Archer Mchugh	Australia	10.61	
5	4	Jonathan Padilla	Mexico	10.62	
6	5	David Nyamufarira	Zimbabwe	10.73	
7	9	Hansen Yap	Malaysia	10.94	
8	3	Che Wickham	Trinidad and Tobago	10.96	
				Wind: (−0.8 m/s)	

==== Heat 5 ====
Rank	Lane	Athlete	Nation	Time	Notes
1	7	Gary Card	Jamaica	10.40	Q
2	9	Benjamin Aravena	Chile	10.45	Q
3	8	Carlos Brown Jr.	Bahamas	10.48	q
4	4	Junior Imoukhuede	Canada	10.51	q
5	3	Nikola Karamanolov	Bulgaria	10.52	q
6	2	Ezekiel Newton	Guyana	10.80	
7	6	Jesus Topize	Mauritius	10.82 [.811]	
8	5	Lou Weng Fu	Macau	10.82 [.816]	
				Wind: (+0.5 m/s)	

==== Heat 6 ====
Rank	Lane	Athlete	Nation	Time	Notes
1	6	Deandre Daley	Jamaica	10.37	Q
2	9	Zeng Keli	China	10.51	Q
3	7	Seán Aigboboh	Ireland	10.55	q
4	8	Chan Yat Lok	Hong Kong	10.64	
5	5	Dineth Weeraratina	Sri Lanka	10.72	
6	3	László Merényi	Finland	10.74	
7	4	Miguel Martes	Dominican Republic	10.78	
8	2	Panashe Nhenga	Zimbabwe	10.95	
				Wind: (−0.4 m/s)	

==== Heat 7 ====
Rank	Lane	Athlete	Nation	Time	Notes
1	2	Bradley Nkoana	South Africa	10.27	Q
2	6	Brayden Williams	United States	10.32	Q, PB
3	5	Fukuto Komuro	Japan	10.47	q
4	7	Keon Rude	Canada	10.64	
5	8	Jackson Clarke	Guyana	10.68	
6	4	Milian Zirbus	Germany	10.77	
7	1	Gael Barreau	Seychelles	11.49	
—	3	Ali Ali	Saudi Arabia	DNS	
—	9	Fernando Satetula	Angola	DNS	
				Wind: (−0.2 m/s)	

==== Heat 8 ====
Rank	Lane	Athlete	Nation	Time	Notes
1	2	Naoki Nishioka	Japan	10.27	Q
2	4	Jonathan Gou Gomez	Switzerland	10.42	Q, NU20R
3	6	Ylann Bizasene	France	10.48	q
4	7	Steven Sabino	Mozambique	10.57	
5	3	Kalle Hirvi	Finland	10.61	
6	9	Mattia Silvestrelli	Italy	10.66	
7	8	Wesley Dionisio	Brazil	10.74	
8	5	Kadeem Larcher	Saint Lucia	10.80	
9	1	Joao Santini	Brazil	10.92	
				Wind: (+0.9 m/s)	

=== Semi-finals ===
The first 2 athletes in each heat (Q) and the next 2 fastest (q) qualified to the final.

==== Heat 1 ====
Rank	Lane	Athlete	Nation	Time	Notes
1	4	Deandre Daley	Jamaica	10.34	Q
2	6	Naoki Nishioka	Japan	10.43	Q
3	9	Hristo Iliev	Bulgaria	10.52	
4	7	Valentin Jensen	Denmark	10.62	
5	2	Adas Dambrauskas	Lithuania	10.63	
6	3	Nwamadi Joel-jin	South Korea	10.65	
7	5	Jonathan Gou Gomez	Switzerland	10.74	
8	8	Zeng Keli	China	10.76	
				Wind: (−0.9 m/s)	

==== Heat 2 ====
Rank	Lane	Athlete	Nation	Time	Notes
1	5	Puripol Boonson	Thailand	10.30 [.297]	Q
2	6	Bradley Nkoana	South Africa	10.30 [.298]	Q
3	7	Gary Card	Jamaica	10.39	q
4	4	Sebastian Sultana	Australia	10.52	
5	8	Benjamin Aravena	Chile	10.59	
6	2	Ylann Bizasene	France	10.61	
7	3	Carlos Brown Jr.	Bahamas	10.63	
8	9	Seán Aigboboh	Ireland	10.65	
				Wind: (−0.6 m/s)	

==== Heat 3 ====
Rank	Lane	Athlete	Nation	Time	Notes
1	5	Bayanda Walaza	South Africa	10.33	Q
2	6	Teddy Wilson	Great Britain	10.35	Q
3	4	He Jinxian	China	10.36	q
4	7	Brayden Williams	United States	10.46	
5	2	Junior Imoukhuede	Canada	10.54	
6	3	Fukuto Komuro	Japan	10.56	
7	9	Nikola Karamanolov	Bulgaria	10.63	
8	8	Merone Wijesinghe	Sri Lanka	10.68	
				Wind: (−0.2 m/s)	

=== Final ===
Rank	Lane	Athlete	Nation	Time	Notes
1st place, gold medalist(s)	4	Bayanda Walaza	South Africa	10.19	
2nd place, silver medalist(s)	6	Puripol Boonson	Thailand	10.22	
3rd place, bronze medalist(s)	7	Bradley Nkoana	South Africa	10.26	
4	5	Deandre Daley	Jamaica	10.33	
5	3	Naoki Nishioka	Japan	10.43	
6	9	Gary Card	Jamaica	10.44	
7	8	Teddy Wilson	Great Britain	10.47	
8	2	He Jinxian	China	10.51	
				Wind: (−0.9 m/s)	
