= 2026 World Athletics U20 Championships – Men's 200 metres =

Men's 200 metres at the 2026 World Athletics U20 Championships
- Venue: Hayward Field
- Dates: 7 August (Round 1 & Semi-finals); 8 August (Final)
- Competitors: 48 from 36 nations
- Winning time: 19.83 CR

Medalists
gold medal	Tate Taylor	United States
silver medal	Blake Hamilton	United States
bronze medal	Jayden Green	Barbados

The men's 200 metres at the 2026 World Athletics U20 Championships was held at Hayward Field in Eugene, United States on 7 and 8 August 2026.

== Records ==
U20 standing records prior to the 2026 World Athletics U20 Championships were as follows:

Record	Athlete & Nationality	Mark	Location	Date
World U20 Record	Gout Gout (AUS)	19.67	Sydney, Australia	12 April 2026
Championship Record	Letsile Tebogo (BOT)	19.96	Cali, Colombia	4 August 2022
Championship Record	Blessing Afrifah (ISR)	19.96	Cali, Colombia	4 August 2022
World U20 Leading	Gout Gout (AUS)	19.67	Sydney, Australia	12 April 2026

== Results ==
=== Round 1 ===
Round 1 took place in the morning session on 7 August 2026.

==== Heat 1 ====
Place	Lane	Athlete	Nation	Time	Notes
1	8	Amir Thompson	Barbados	20.49	Q
2	7	Diego Nappi	Italy	20.71	Q, PB
3	5	Chae-min Jun	South Korea	20.98	Q, PB
4	9	Josiah John	Australia	21.00	q, PB
5	6	Ching Hang Wesley Leung	Hong Kong	21.13	SB
6	2	Jessus Bănicioiu	Romania	21.33	
7	4	Chen Jinxin	China	21.46	
—	3	Thiep Deng	South Sudan	DQ	TR17.2.3
				Wind: (−0.4 m/s)	

==== Heat 2 ====
Place	Lane	Athlete	Nation	Time	Notes
1	2	Makaelan Woods	Trinidad and Tobago	20.92	Q
2	9	Mukona Manavhela	South Africa	21.10	Q
3	5	Richard Machata	Slovakia	21.19	Q
4	6	William Batley	Canada	21.33	
5	7	Faisal Hassan Alasmari	Saudi Arabia	21.37	
6	3	Dmitri Petrogradov	Estonia	21.51	
7	4	Dong-jin Kim	South Korea	21.61	
8	8	Ty'rique Charles	British Virgin Islands	21.69	
				Wind: (−1.1 m/s)	

==== Heat 3 ====
Place	Lane	Athlete	Nation	Time	Notes
1	3	Tomoro Ide	Japan	20.53	Q, PB
2	7	Gary Card	Jamaica	20.76	Q
3	5	Dubem Amah	Ireland	20.96	Q, PB
4	4	Dylan Hall	Australia	21.12	PB
5	2	Caylon Ryan	South Africa	21.16	
6	6	Mihael BartolinčIć	Croatia	21.23	
7	9	Perfect Faye	Nigeria	21.29	
8	8	Felix Krifka	Austria	21.32	
				Wind: (+0.5 m/s)	

==== Heat 4 ====
Place	Lane	Athlete	Nation	Time	Notes
1	2	Emile Mumenthaler	Switzerland	20.62	Q, NU20R
2	9	Eagan Neely	Bahamas	20.63	Q, PB
3	6	Tishawn Easton	Guyana	20.66	Q, NU20R
4	7	Jake Odey-Jordan	Great Britain	20.69	q
5	8	Žiga BožIč	Slovenia	20.97	q, PB
6	4	Richard Janura	Slovakia	21.29	
—	3	Harry Irfan Curran	Singapore	DNF	
—	5	Wazha Matakule	Botswana	DQ	
				Wind: (+0.5 m/s)	

==== Heat 5 ====
Place	Lane	Athlete	Nation	Time	Notes
1	9	Tate Taylor	United States	21.02	Q
2	3	Mayo Alabi	Great Britain	21.15	Q
3	6	Bartosz Pytlik	Poland	21.17	Q
4	7	Hikari Osinachi Abraham	Japan	21.18	
5	2	Antonios Katsantonis	Cyprus	21.33	
6	5	Wyatt Lee	Canada	21.46	
7	4	Skylar Charles	Guyana	21.51	
8	8	Giammarco Gulini	San Marino	21.74	NU20R
				Wind: (+0.1 m/s)	

==== Heat 6 ====
Place	Lane	Athlete	Nation	Time	Notes
1	3	Blake Hamilton	United States	20.54	Q
2	5	Pedro Afonso	Portugal	20.77	Q
3	4	Nathaniel Martin	Jamaica	21.00	Q
4	2	Sadew Vimansa Rajakaruna	Sri Lanka	21.12	q
5	9	Jack Newman	Botswana	21.18	
6	6	Luca Castellazzi	Italy	21.20	
7	8	Christopher Nordlie	Norway	21.22	
8	7	Hsieh Cheng-Kuei	Chinese Taipei	21.65	
				Wind: (−0.1 m/s)	

==== Heat 7 ====
Place	Lane	Athlete	Nation	Time	Notes
1	9	Jayden Green	Barbados	20.58	Q
2	8	Jakub Sarlej	Poland	20.85	Q, PB
3	2	Cheuk Fung Jasper Koo	Hong Kong	20.86	Q, NU20R
4	6	Omel Shashintha Silva Jayathungalage	Sri Lanka	20.90	q, SB
5	5	Miles Outerbridge	Bermuda	20.98	q
6	4	J'den Jackson	British Virgin Islands	21.19	
7	3	Liu Jianwei	China	21.22	
8	7	Kasiya Daley	Antigua and Barbuda	21.23	
				Wind: (+1.6 m/s)	

=== Semi-finals ===
Semi-finals took place in the afternoon session on 7 August 2026.

==== Heat 1 ====
Place	Lane	Athlete	Nation	Time	Notes
1	7	Blake Hamilton	United States	20.38	Q
2	6	Jayden Green	Barbados	20.46	Q
3	5	Gary Card	Jamaica	20.64	Q
4	8	Diego Nappi	Italy	20.72	
5	4	Richard Machata	Slovakia	21.06	
6	2	Sadew Vimansa Rajakaruna	Sri Lanka	21.12	
7	9	Tishawn Easton	Guyana	21.19	
8	3	Cheuk Fung Jasper Koo	Hong Kong	21.23	
9	1	Dylan Hall	Australia	21.29	
				Wind: (−0.5 m/s)	

==== Heat 2 ====
Place	Lane	Athlete	Nation	Time	Notes
1	8	Tomoro Ide	Japan	20.63	Q
2	5	Pedro Afonso	Portugal	20.66	Q, =NU20R
3	7	Emile Mumenthaler	Switzerland	20.82	Q
4	6	Eagan Neely	Bahamas	21.01	
5	4	Dubem Amah	Ireland	21.04	
6	2	Josiah John	Australia	21.05	
7	9	Mayo Alabi	Great Britain	21.24	
8	1	Omel Shashintha Silva Jayathungalage	Sri Lanka	21.45	
9	3	Bartosz Pytlik	Poland	22.14	
				Wind: (+0.5 m/s)	

==== Heat 3 ====
Place	Lane	Athlete	Nation	Time	Notes
1	5	Tate Taylor	United States	20.34	Q
2	8	Makaelan Woods	Trinidad and Tobago	20.47	Q, PB
3	9	Chae-min Jun	South Korea	20.88	Q, PB
4	4	Mukona Manavhela	South Africa	20.89	
5	6	Jakub Sarlej	Poland	20.99	
6	3	Nathaniel Martin	Jamaica	21.13	
7	1	Žiga Božič	Slovenia	21.26	
8	2	Miles Outerbridge	Bermuda	21.36	
—	7	Amir Thompson	Barbados	DQ	TR17.3.3
				Wind: (+0.4 m/s)	

=== Final ===
The final took place in the afternoon session on 8 August 2026.

Place	Lane	Athlete	Nation	Time	Notes
1st place, gold medalist(s)	5	Tate Taylor	United States	19.83	CR
2nd place, silver medalist(s)	7	Blake Hamilton	United States	20.31	
3rd place, bronze medalist(s)	8	Jayden Green	Barbados	20.55	
4	4	Makaelan Woods	Trinidad and Tobago	20.58	
5	6	Tomoro Ide	Japan	20.67	
6	9	Gary Card	Jamaica	20.74	
7	2	Emile Mumenthaler	Switzerland	20.84	
8	1	Chae-min Jun	South Korea	21.03	
9	3	Pedro Afonso	Portugal	21.11	
				Wind: (+0.1 m/s)	
