= Kyler Brown =

American sprinter

Personal information
- Born: 7 February 2007 (age 19)

Sport
- Sport: Athletics
- Event: Sprint
Medal record
Men's athletics
Representing United States
World U20 Championships
Gold medal – first place	2026 Eugene	4×100 m relay

Kyler Brown (born 7 February 2007) is an American sprinter.

== Biography ==
Brown was educated at Booker T. Washington High School in Oklahoma. He was named 2025 Gatorade Oklahoma Boys Track & Field Athlete of Year having won Oklahoma state high school titles in the 100 metres and 200 metres, and having a fourth-place finish in the 100 m at the Nike Outdoor Nationals. That year, he signed for Ohio State University.

In June 2026, he ran a leg on Ohio State's third-place 4 x 100 metres relay team at the 2026 NCAA Outdoor Championships. Later that month he ran 10.21 seconds for the 100 m to finish runner-up to Tate Taylor with Dillon Mitchell in third at the 2026 USATF U20 Championships. On 5 August, he qualified for the final of the 100 metres at the 2026 World Athletics U20 Championships with a time of 10.16 seconds, before placing fourth overall in the final. He won a gold medal with the men's 4 x 100 metres relay team on the final day of the championships alongside Taylor, Mitchell, and Blake Hamilton in a new world U20 record of 38.16 seconds, surpassing the previous best set by South Africa in winning the title in 2021.
