= Marko Ferreira =

South African sprinter (born 2007)

Personal information
- Born: 11 January 2007 (age 19)

Sport
- Sport: Athletics
- Event: Sprint
Medal record
Men's athletics
Representing South Africa
World U20 Championships
Bronze medal – third place	2026 Eugene	100m

Marko Ferreira (born 11 January 2007) is a South African sprinter.

== Biography ==
From Gqeberha, Ferreira is a member of Eastern Province Athletics (EPU). He won the South African U20 championships 100 metres title in March 2026 as a 19 year-old, running a 10.09 seconds personal best in the semi-finals before returning to claim the national title in 10.16 seconds in the final, winning ahead of the pre-race favourite Mukona Manavhela. The following month, he ran 10.18 seconds to qualify for the final of the 100 metres at the senior South African Athletics Championships, placing fifth overall. In June, Ferreira ran a new personal best of 10.04 seconds (+1.8 m/s) for the 100 metres, to win at the Meeting Montgeron-Essonne in France, the time moving him to third on the South African all-time under-20 list.

On 5 August, he qualified for the final of the 100 metres at the 2026 World Athletics U20 Championships in Eugene, United States, with a time of 10.13 seconds. He then won the bronze medal in the final the following day, finishing behind Tate Taylor of the United States and Jamaica's Gary Card. With the medal, Ferreira ensured a South African on the podium of the 100 m race for the fourth consecutive edition of the championships.
