= Blake Hamilton (sprinter) =

American sprinter (born 2007)

Personal information
- Born: 27 August 2007 (age 19)

Sport
- Sport: Athletics
- Event: Sprint

Achievements and titles
- Personal best: 200m: 20.02 (2026)
Medal record
Men's athletics
Representing United States
World U20 Championships
Gold medal – first place	2026 Eugene	4×100 m relay
Silver medal – second place	2026 Eugene	200m

Blake Hamilton (born 27 August 2007) is an American sprinter.

== Biography ==
Hamilton studies at the University of South California in Los Angeles. In May 2026, Hamilton won the 6A 2026 UIL Texas State Championships title over 200 metres with a wind-assisted time of 19.86 seconds (+4.6 m/s) to win ahead of Dillon Mitchell, who ran 20.50 seconds. He was also part of a championship winning 4 x 100 m relay and runner-up as part of the 4 x 200 m relay as his Tompkins school won the team title.

Hamilton was runner-up to Tate Taylor in the 200 metres at the 2026 USA U20 Championships, running 20.02 seconds in the final on 19 June. Competing at the 2026 World Athletics U20 Championships in Eugene, USA, he ran 20.38 seconds to win his semi-final heat and qualify for the final with the second fastest time of the 200 metres, behind Taylor, before winning the silver medal in the final, again behind Taylor, for an American one-two finish with Barbadian Jayden Green placing third. On the final day of the championships he won the gold medal in the men's 4 x 100 metres relay alongside Taylor, Kyler Brown, and Dillon Mitchell, with the quartet running a new world U20 record of 38.16 seconds, surpassing the previous best set by South Africa in winning the title in 2021.
