= Tate Taylor =

Tate Taylor may refer to:

- Tate Taylor (filmmaker) (born 1969), American actor and filmmaker
- Tate Taylor (sprinter) (born 2007), American track and field athlete
