= 2026 World Athletics U20 Championships – Men's 100 metres =

Men's 100 metres at the 2026 World Athletics U20 Championships
- Venue: Hayward Field
- Dates: 5 August (Round 1 & Semi-finals); 6 August (Final)
- Competitors: 72 from 51 nations
- Winning time: 9.94 PB

Medalists
gold medal	Tate Taylor	United States
silver medal	Gary Card	Jamaica
bronze medal	Marko Ferreira	South Africa

The men's 100 metres at the 2026 World Athletics U20 Championships was held at Hayward Field in Eugene, United States on 5 and 6 August 2026.

== Records ==
U20 standing records prior to the 2026 World Athletics U20 Championships were as follows:

Record	Athlete (nation)	Time (s)	Location	Date
World U20 Record	Letsile Tebogo (BOT)	9.91	Cali, Colombia	2 August 2022
Championship Record	Letsile Tebogo (BOT)	9.91	Cali, Colombia	2 August 2022
World U20 Leading	Gary Card (JAM)	9.93	Kingston, Jamaica	19 June 2026

== Results ==
=== Round 1 ===
Round 1 took place in the morning session on 5 August 2026. The first 3 of each heat (Q) plus 3 fastest times (q) qualify to the semi-finals.

==== Heat 1 ====
Place	Lane	Athlete	Nation	Time	Notes
1	7	Gary Card	Jamaica	10.07	Q
2	5	Dai Hongyu	China	10.29	Q
3	8	Uwezo Lubenda	Australia	10.33	Q, PB
4	9	Ishmael Rolle	Bahamas	10.48	
5	3	Sam van Dooren	Belgium	10.49 [.481]	
6	1	Leonardo Pratali	Italy	10.49 [.484]	
7	2	Santiago Lazar	Uruguay	10.52	
8	6	Hunter Jett Jahnke	Tonga	10.58	NU20R
9	4	Yassir Esaud Cruz	Honduras	10.64	PB
				Wind: (+0.3 m/s)	

==== Heat 2 ====
Place	Lane	Athlete	Nation	Time	Notes
1	6	Jake Odey-Jordan	Great Britain	10.38	Q
2	9	Tejiri Godwin	Nigeria	10.39 [.382]	Q
3	5	Richard Machata	Slovakia	10.39 [.390]	Q
4	2	Jean Augusto da Silva	Brazil	10.58	
5	4	Ruano Bock Payhama De Carvalho	Namibia	10.60	
6	1	Yurii Mudryk	Ukraine	10.71	
7	8	Mariano Fiol	Peru	10.76	
8	3	Gordon Ezekiel Thompson	Guyana	10.77	
9	7	Kyon Christopher Maduro	Aruba	10.93	PB
				Wind: (−0.3 m/s)	

==== Heat 3 ====
Place	Lane	Athlete	Nation	Time	Notes
1	8	Michael Cruz	Brazil	10.37	Q, SB
2	6	Onesi Dunn	Guyana	10.38	Q
3	4	Wazha Matakule	Botswana	10.39	Q, PB
4	5	Chan Yat Lok	Hong Kong	10.45	
5	9	Alex Seepersad	Trinidad and Tobago	10.51	
6	3	J'den Jackson	British Virgin Islands	10.57	
7	1	Fang Juncheng	China	10.59	
8	7	Markus le Fjeld	Norway	10.72	
				Wind: (+0.2 m/s)	

==== Heat 4 ====
Place	Lane	Athlete	Nation	Time	Notes
1	3	Marko Ferreira	South Africa	10.11	Q
2	2	Kwok Chun Ting	Hong Kong	10.29 [.286]	Q, NU20R
3	5	Wyatt Lee	Canada	10.29 [.289]	Q
4	6	Daniele Orlando	Italy	10.36	q, PB
5	9	Dmitri Petrogradov	Estonia	10.37	q, NU20R
6	1	Lennox Schmidt	Germany	10.42	
7	8	Ricardo Malik Mann	Saint Lucia	10.71	
8	4	Andro Grigorjan	Georgia	10.80	
9	7	Yahraya Doctrine	U.S. Virgin Islands	10.98	PB
				Wind: (+1.2 m/s)	

==== Heat 5 ====
Place	Lane	Athlete	Nation	Time	Notes
1	4	Akira Eghagha	Switzerland	10.28	Q
2	1	Hiroto Shinozaki	Japan	10.29	Q, PB
3	6	Jakob Kemminer	Germany	10.32	Q
4	8	Chae-min Jun	South Korea	10.33	q, PB
5	2	Dontae Watson	Jamaica	10.46 [.452]	
6	5	Lambros Christofides	Cyprus	10.46 [.459]	PB
7	3	Deyan Tsvetanov	Bulgaria	10.49	PB
8	9	Simon Daniel Tang	Northern Mariana Islands	11.50	PB
				Wind: (+1.4 m/s)	

==== Heat 6 ====
Place	Lane	Athlete	Nation	Time	Notes
1	4	Tate Taylor	United States	10.05	Q
2	3	Danish Iftikhar Muhammad Roslee	Malaysia	10.30	Q, SB
3	8	Zavier Peacock	Australia	10.32	Q, PB
4	1	Trevaughn Stewart	Trinidad and Tobago	10.41	
5	9	Miles Outerbridge	Bermuda	10.52	
6	2	Timotej Nemček	Slovakia	10.57	
7	5	Yoan Kamenov	Bulgaria	10.75	
8	6	Ahmed Qais Moosa Al-Jabri	Oman	10.77	
9	7	Teo Bottin	Monaco	11.25	NU20R
				Wind: (±0.0 m/s)	

==== Heat 7 ====
Place	Lane	Athlete	Nation	Time	Notes
1	6	Kai Sugano	Japan	10.44 [.431]	Q
2	7	Mukona Manavhela	South Africa	10.44 [.440]	Q
3	1	Antonios Katsantonis	Cyprus	10.50	Q
4	9	Krisztián Kalics	Hungary	10.52	
5	8	Gift Bright	Nigeria	10.60	
6	2	Martynas Kolupaila	Lithuania	10.64	
7	3	Saad Jamaldeen	Sri Lanka	10.66	
8	5	Noah Horspool	Canada	10.72	
9	4	Atta Ullah	Pakistan	10.86	PB
				Wind: (−0.8 m/s)	

==== Heat 8 ====
Place	Lane	Athlete	Nation	Time	Notes
1	5	Kyler Brown	United States	10.19	Q
2	3	Bright Otiora	Belgium	10.30	Q
3	9	James Arminio	Great Britain	10.32	Q
4	2	Luca Marrocco	Switzerland	10.40	PB
5	6	Louis Khawel	Kenya	10.51	
6	1	Lok Io Leong	Macau	10.53	
7	7	Liam Aqwa	Israel	10.62	
8	8	Muhamad Airiel Iskandar bin Rusli	Malaysia	10.65	
9	4	Rifat Sheikh	Bangladesh	11.06	PB
				Wind: (+0.3 m/s)	

=== Semi-finals ===
The semi-finals took place in the afternoon session on 5 August 2026.

==== Heat 1 ====
Place	Lane	Athlete	Nation	Time	Notes
1	5	Marko Ferreira	South Africa	10.13	Q
2	4	Kyler Brown	United States	10.16	Q
3	9	Wazha Matakule	Botswana	10.28	Q, PB
4	1	Dmitri Petrogradov	Estonia	10.31	NU20R
5	8	Wyatt Lee	Canada	10.32	
6	3	Tejiri Godwin	Nigeria	10.34	
7	7	Kwok Chun Ting	Hong Kong	10.36	
8	2	Uwezo Lubenda	Australia	10.54	
9	6	Dai Hongyu	China	10.69	
				Wind: (+0.6 m/s)	

==== Heat 2 ====
Place	Lane	Athlete	Nation	Time	Notes
1	4	Gary Card	Jamaica	10.16	Q
2	7	Danish Iftikhar Muhammad Roslee	Malaysia	10.36	Q
3	1	Richard Machata	Slovakia	10.38 [.372]	Q
4	8	Mukona Manavhela	South Africa	10.38 [.377]	
5	6	Akira Eghagha	Switzerland	10.39 [.382]	
6	2	James Arminio	Great Britain	10.39 [.390]	
7	9	Daniele Orlando	Italy	10.41	
8	5	Kai Sugano	Japan	10.43	
9	3	Onesi Dunn	Guyana	10.48	
				Wind: (+0.1 m/s)	

==== Heat 3 ====
Place	Lane	Athlete	Nation	Time	Notes
1	4	Tate Taylor	United States	10.06	Q
2	5	Jake Odey-Jordan	Great Britain	10.24	Q
3	3	Bright Otiora	Belgium	10.32	Q
4	6	Michael Cruz	Brazil	10.35	SB
5	2	Jakob Kemminer	Germany	10.36 [.351]	
6	8	Zavier Peacock	Australia	10.36 [.358]	
7	7	Hiroto Shinozaki	Japan	10.43	
8	1	Chae-min Jun	South Korea	10.47	
9	9	Antonios Katsantonis	Cyprus	10.52	
				Wind: (+0.1 m/s)	

=== Final ===
The final took place in the afternoon on 6 August 2026.

Place	Lane	Athlete	Nation	Time	Notes
1st place, gold medalist(s)	5	Tate Taylor	United States	9.94	PB
2nd place, silver medalist(s)	4	Gary Card	Jamaica	10.05	
3rd place, bronze medalist(s)	6	Marko Ferreira	South Africa	10.16	
4	7	Kyler Brown	United States	10.29	
5	3	Jake Odey-Jordan	Great Britain	10.31	
6	9	Richard Machata	Slovakia	10.34	=PB
7	1	Bright Otiora	Belgium	10.41	
8	8	Danish Iftikhar Muhammad Roslee	Malaysia	10.44	
9	2	Wazha Matakule	Botswana	10.54	
				Wind: (+0.1 m/s)	
