= 2024 World Athletics U20 Championships – Men's 200 metres =

Men's 200 metres at the 2024 World Athletics U20 Championships
- Venue: Estadio Atlético de la VIDENA
- Dates: 29 August 2024 (heats & semi-finals); 30 August 2024 (final)
- Competitors: 58 from 38 nations
- Winning time: 20.52

Medalists
gold medal	Bayanda Walaza	South Africa
silver medal	Gout Gout	Australia
bronze medal	Jake Odey-Jordan	Great Britain

The men's 200 metres at the 2024 World Athletics U20 Championships was held at the Estadio Atlético de la VIDENA in Lima, Peru on 29 and 30 August 2024.

== Records ==
U20 standing records prior to the 2024 World Athletics U20 Championships were as follows:

Record	Athlete & Nationality	Mark	Location	Date
World U20 Record	Erriyon Knighton (USA)	19.69	Eugene, United States	26 June 2022
Championship Record	Letsile Tebogo (BOT)	19.96	Cali, Colombia	4 August 2022
Championship Record	Blessing Afrifah (ISR)	19.96	Cali, Colombia	4 August 2022
World U20 Leading	Nyckoles Harbor (USA)	20.20	Lexington, United States	24 May 2024

== Results ==
=== Heats ===
The first 2 athletes in each heat (Q) and the next 8 fastest (q) qualified to the semi-finals.

==== Heat 1 ====
Rank	Lane	Athlete	Nation	Time	Notes
1	2	Jesse Myers	United States	21.43	Q
2	4	Eduardo Longobardi	Italy	21.45	Q
3	3	Daniel González	Spain	21.64	
4	7	Wesley da Silva	Brazil	21.69	
5	6	Keo Davis	Saint Vincent and the Grenadines	21.73	
6	5	Sophus Ramsgaard Jensen	Denmark	21.78	
7	8	Mihai Militaru	Romania	24.54	
				Wind: (−1.1 m/s)	

==== Heat 2 ====
Rank	Lane	Athlete	Nation	Time	Notes
1	9	Jackson Clarke	Guyana	21.37	Q
2	6	Kong Peng	China	21.49	Q
3	8	Jessus Bănicioiu	Romania	21.72	
4	2	Andrew Styles	Bahamas	21.72	
5	7	Maximilian Achhammer	Germany	21.95	
6	3	Aron Earl	Peru	22.12	SB
–	5	Paulo Henrique Batista	Brazil	DNS	
–	4	William Batley	Canada	DNS	
				Wind: (−1.0 m/s)	

==== Heat 3 ====
Rank	Lane	Athlete	Nation	Time	Notes
1	7	Jake Odey-Jordan	Great Britain	21.02	Q
2	8	Magnus Johannsson	Hong Kong	21.27	Q
3	3	Katsuki Sato	Japan	21.31	q
4	2	Miloš Nisić	Serbia	21.87	
5	5	Isaac Chandra	Canada	21.89	
6	6	Caledon Ruwende	Zimbabwe	22.01	
–	4	Mubarak Bader Al-Qahtani	Saudi Arabia	DNF	
				Wind: (−1.1 m/s)	

==== Heat 4 ====
Rank	Lane	Athlete	Nation	Time	Notes
1	7	Gout Gout	Australia	20.77	Q
2	5	Malith Thamel	Sri Lanka	21.23	Q
3	6	Alejandro Cardenas	Mexico	21.32	q
4	2	Bertie Cruywagen	South Africa	21.64	
5	8	Justin Rennert	Germany	21.87	
6	3	Magano Naseb	Namibia	22.14	
7	4	Omar Chaaban	Palestine	23.00	
–	9	Yip King Wai	Hong Kong	DQ	TR17.2.3
				Wind: (−0.5 m/s)	

==== Heat 5 ====
Rank	Lane	Athlete	Nation	Time	Notes
1	6	Jaden Wiley	United States	20.93	Q
2	5	Zachary Della Rocca	Australia	21.03	Q
3	9	Dejan Ottou	France	21.32	q
4	4	Bejamin Aravena	Chile	21.44	q
5	3	Matteo Miola	Italy	21.65	
6	2	David Nyamufarira	Zimbabwe	21.78	
7	7	Sanjay Weekes	Montserrat	21.95	
8	8	Vladimir Bitolja	North Macedonia	22.51	
				Wind: (−1.3 m/s)	

==== Heat 6 ====
Rank	Lane	Athlete	Nation	Time	Notes
1	4	Bayanda Walaza	South Africa	21.16	Q
2	6	Carlos Brown Jr.	Bahamas	21.31	Q
3	5	Hristo Iliev	Bulgaria	21.53	q
4	7	Jónas Isaksen	Denmark	21.63	
5	8	Aidil Hajam	Malaysia	22.20	
6	2	Junior Gallimore	Jamaica	22.46	
7	3	Aistis Manton	Lithuania	22.71	
				Wind: (−0.4 m/s)	

==== Heat 7 ====
Rank	Lane	Athlete	Nation	Time	Notes
1	5	Kei Wakana	Japan	21.17	Q
2	6	Juho Venäläinen	Finland	21.23 [.226]	Q
3	2	Aragorn Straker	Barbados	21.23 [.228]	q
4	3	Sebastian Libura	Poland	21.63	
5	4	Youchao Huang	China	21.73	
6	7	Devonric Mack	Saint Vincent and the Grenadines	22.01	
7	8	Eduardo Loya	Mexico	22.05	
				Wind: (−0.1 m/s)	

==== Heat 8 ====
Rank	Lane	Athlete	Nation	Time	Notes
1	4	William Trulsson	Sweden	20.99	Q
2	8	Marek Zakrzewski	Poland	21.11	Q
3	3	Yaqoub Al Azemi	Kuwait	21.24	q, PB
4	6	Romario Hines	Jamaica	21.35	q
5	5	Muhammad Amin Bin Rosla	Malaysia	21.54	
6	7	Indusara Rajamuni (Note: Indusara Rajamuni did not originally qualify for the semi-finals however due to Marek Zakrzewski opting to take no further part in the competition Rajamuni was placed in to Heat 2 of the semi-finals.)	Sri Lanka	21.56	q
–	2	Tomás Mondino	Argentina	DNS	
				Wind: (−0.6 m/s)	

=== Semi-finals ===
The first 2 athletes in each heat (Q) and the next 2 fastest (q) qualified to the final.

==== Heat 1 ====
Rank	Lane	Athlete	Nation	Time	Notes
1	7	Gout Gout	Australia	21.07	Q
2	9	Magnus Johannsson	Hong Kong	21.21	Q
3	6	Kei Wakana	Japan	21.33	
4	4	Yaqoub Al Azemi	Kuwait	21.35	
5	2	Dejan Ottou	France	21.65 [.644]	
6	3	Hristo Iliev	Bulgaria	21.65 [.644]	
7	8	Jackson Clarke	Guyana	21.88	
8	5	Malith Thamel	Sri Lanka	21.93	
				Wind: (−0.9 m/s)	

==== Heat 2 ====
Rank	Lane	Athlete	Nation	Time	Notes
1	6	William Trulsson	Sweden	21.30	Q
2	7	Jake Odey-Jordan	Great Britain	21.40	Q
3	9	Eduardo Longobardi	Italy	21.52	
4	3	Romario Hines	Jamaica	21.68	
5	2	Alejandro Cardenas	Mexico	21.69	
6	8	Jesse Myers	United States	21.80	
7	5	Indusara Rajamuni	Sri Lanka	21.93	
–	4	Kong Peng	China	DQ	TR17.2.3
				Wind: (−1.2 m/s)	

==== Heat 3 ====
Rank	Lane	Athlete	Nation	Time	Notes
1	7	Bayanda Walaza	South Africa	21.00	Q
2	8	Jaden Wiley	United States	21.04	Q
3	9	Carlos Brown Jr.	Bahamas	21.19	q
4	6	Zachary Della Rocca	Australia	21.23	q
5	4	Aragorn Straker	Barbados	21.30	
6	2	Katsuki Sato	Japan	21.47	
7	5	Juho Venäläinen	Finland	21.54	
8	3	Bejamin Aravena	Chile	21.55	
				Wind: (+0.3 m/s)	

=== Final ===
Rank	Lane	Athlete	Nation	Time	Notes
1st place, gold medalist(s)	7	Bayanda Walaza	South Africa	20.52	
2nd place, silver medalist(s)	8	Gout Gout	Australia	20.60	AU18B
3rd place, bronze medalist(s)	5	Jake Odey-Jordan	Great Britain	20.81	
4	6	William Trulsson	Sweden	20.91	
5	4	Jaden Wiley	United States	21.17	
6	3	Zachary Della Rocca	Australia	21.22	
7	9	Magnus Johannsson	Hong Kong	21.27	
8	2	Carlos Brown Jr.	Bahamas	21.51	
				Wind: (−0.7 m/s)	
