= Dillon Mitchell =

Dillon Mitchell may refer to:

- Dillon Mitchell (gridiron football) (born 1997), American football player
- Dillon Mitchell (basketball) (born 2003), American basketball player
- Dillon Mitchell (sprinter) (born 2009), American athlete
