= 2026 World Athletics U20 Championships – Men's 4 × 100 metres relay =

Men's 4 × 100 metres relay at the 2026 World Athletics U20 Championships
- Venue: Hayward Field
- Dates: 8 August (Round 1); 9 August (Final)
- Competitors: 118 from 28 nations
- Winning time: 38.16 WU20R

Medalists
gold medal	Blake Hamilton; Dillon Mitchell; Kyler Brown; Tate Taylor; Jayson Smith*; Auralleus Hicks*	United States
silver medal	Divine Iheme; Jake Odey-Jordan; Ethan Franklin; James Arminio; Mayo Alabi*	Great Britain
bronze medal	Kyle Bodden; Gary Card; Nyrone Wade; Sanjay Seymore; Nathaniel Martin*	Jamaica

The men's 4 × 100 metres relay at the 2026 World Athletics U20 Championships was held at Hayward Field in Eugene, United States on 8 and 9 August 2026.

== Records ==
U20 standing records prior to the 2026 World Athletics U20 Championships were as follows:

Record	Nation	Mark	Location	Date
World U20 Record	South Africa	38.51	Nairobi, Kenya	22 August 2021
Championship Record	South Africa	38.51	Nairobi, Kenya	22 August 2021
World U20 Leading	United States	38.56	Miramar, United States	4 April 2026

== Results ==
=== Round 1 ===
Round 1 took place in the morning session on 8 August 2026. First 2 of each heat (Q) plus 1 fastest time (q) qualify to Final

==== Heat 1 ====
Place	Lane	Nation	Athletes	Time	Notes
1	7	Jamaica	Kyle Bodden, Nyrone Wade, Nathaniel Martin, Sanjay Seymore	39.51	Q, SB
2	2	Japan	Hiroto Shinozaki, Hikari Osinachi Abraham, Tomoro Ide, Maito Kamakura	39.65	Q, SB
3	6	Hong Kong	Chan Yat Lok, Kwok Chun Ting, Ching Hang Wesley Leung, Cheuk Fung Jasper Koo	39.66	NU20R
4	5	Australia	Uwezo Lubenda, Dylan Hall, Kelechi Ekwomadu, Josiah John	39.73	
5	8	Brazil	Kaua Ventura, Jean Augusto da Silva, Gabriel Souza, Michael Cruz	40.42	SB
6	4	Poland	Łukasz Jasiński, Jakub Sarlej, Kacper Latkowski, Nikodem Dymiński	40.56	
—	3	Canada	Wyatt Lee, William Batley, Patrick Buscu, Noah Horspool	DQ	TR24.7

==== Heat 2 ====
Place	Lane	Nation	Athletes	Time	Notes
1	6	Trinidad and Tobago	Kadeem Chinapoo, Alex Seepersad, Makaelan Isiah Randall Woods, Trevaughn Stewart	39.40	Q, SB
2	7	South Africa	Zattu Hlongwane, Mukona Manavhela, Caylon Ryan, Marko Ferreira	39.86	Q, SB
3	8	Czech Republic	Richard Smolík, Filip Vojáček, Josef Simmer, Martin dušek	40.30	
4	2	Ireland	Joshua Awujoola, Ben Sykes, Adam Ofeimun, Dubem Amah	40.39	
5	5	Slovakia	Dominik Chobot, Timotej Nemček, Richard Janura, Richard Machata	40.53	NU20R
6	9	India	Rudra Shinde, Anshu Rajak, J Krishna, Neil Samraj	41.01	
7	4	Guyana	Ezekiel Millington, Gordon Ezekiel Thompson, Dequan Farrell, Onesi Dunn	41.11	
8	3	Papua New Guinea	Ethan Asimba, Calvert Avae, Kabake Lansana, Jack Mahuru	43.53	SB

==== Heat 3 ====
Place	Lane	Nation	Athletes	Time	Notes
1	4	Great Britain	Divine Iheme, Mayo Alabi, Ethan Franklin, James Arminio	39.38	Q
2	6	Germany	Florian Reichl, Lennox Schmidt, Alvin Mawumba, Jakob Kemminer	39.39	Q, SB
3	5	Belgium	Bright Otiora, Rune Vandezande, Jari de Proft, Sam van Dooren	39.45	q, NU20R
4	3	Botswana	Kopano Mpitsang, Wazha Matakule, Lucky Knight Chivero, Jack Newman	39.84	NU20R
5	2	British Virgin Islands	Mario Carter, J'den Jackson, Ty'rique Charles, Jaheem Lennard-Joseph	40.70	NU20R
6	7	Bulgaria	Vasil Antonov, Yoan Kamenov, Martin Stoyanov, Deyan Tsvetanov	40.88	

==== Heat 4 ====
Place	Lane	Nation	Athletes	Time	Notes
1	7	United States	Jayson Smith, Dillon Mitchell, Kyler Brown, Auralleus Hicks	38.87	Q, SB
2	8	Switzerland	Emile Mumenthaler, Akira Eghagha, Luca Marrocco, Ashik Begum	39.32	Q, NU20R
3	4	China	Juncheng Fang, Jianwei Liu, Jinxin Chen, Hongyu Dai	40.09	
4	6	South Korea	Sun-woo Kim, Dong-jin Kim, Sung-won Choi, Chae-min Jun	40.23	
5	5	Bahamas	Terrin Beckles, Ishmael Rolle, Carlin Archer, Eagan Neely	40.93	
6	3	Hungary	Botond Horváth, Krisztián Kalics, Péter Csaba Sáray, Roland Kis	41.25	
—	2	Italy	Daniele Orlando, Luca Castellazzi, Diego Nappi, Leo Oumar Domenis	DNF	

=== Final ===
The final took place in the afternoon session on 9 August 2026.

Place	Lane	Nation	Athletes	Time	Notes
1st place, gold medalist(s)	5	United States	Blake Hamilton, Dillon Mitchell, Kyler Brown, Tate Taylor	38.16	WU20R
2nd place, silver medalist(s)	6	Great Britain	Divine Iheme, Jake Odey-Jordan, Ethan Franklin, James Arminio	38.90	=AU20R
3rd place, bronze medalist(s)	4	Jamaica	Kyle Bodden, Gary Card, Nyrone Wade, Sanjay Seymore	39.01	SB
4	3	Japan	Hiroto Shinozaki, Hikari Abraham, Tomoro Ide, Maito Kamakura	39.41	SB
5	7	Trinidad and Tobago	Kadeem Chinapoo, Alex Seepersad, Makaelan Woods, Trevaughn Stewart	39.44	
6	1	South Africa	Phenyo Miyen, Zattu Hlongwane, Caylon Ryan, Marko Ferreira	39.48	SB
7	9	Germany	Florian Reichl, Lennox Schmidt, Alvin Mawumba, Ben Tröster	39.79	
8	2	Belgium	Bright Otiora, Rune Vandezande, Jari De Proft, Sam Van Dooren	39.83	
—	8	Switzerland	Emile Mumenthaler, Akira Eghagha, Luca Marrocco, Ashik Beguma	DQ	TR24.7
