= 2026 NACAC U23 Championships in Athletics – Results =

These are the results of the 2026 NACAC U23 Championships in Athletics which took place between 9 and 12 July, at the Estadio Una Nueva Historia in Apizaco, Tlaxcala, Mexico.

== Men's results ==
=== 100 metres ===
Heats – 10 July
Wind:
Heat 1: -0.4 m/s, Heat 2: +0.5 m/s, Heat 3: -1.0 m/s

Rank	Heat	Name	Nationality	Time	Notes
1	3	Bouwahjgie Nkrumie	Jamaica	10.22	Q
2	2	Damor Miller	Jamaica	10.26	Q
3	1	Darren McQueen	Haiti	10.33	Q
4	1	Zion Campbell	Bahamas	10.37	Q
4	3	Aaron Charles	Trinidad and Tobago	10.37	Q
6	2	Adam Musgrove	Bahamas	10.39	Q
7	2	Dwayne Fleming	Antigua and Barbuda	10.40	q
7	3	Adrián Canales	Puerto Rico	10.40	q
9	1	Revell Webster	Trinidad and Tobago	10.43	
10	1	Ángel Márquez	Trinidad and Tobago	10.54	
11	2	Trenton Brooks	Anguilla	10.60	
12	1	Amari Knight	Barbados	10.61	
13	1	Kasiya Daley	Antigua and Barbuda	10.62	
14	2	Norre Robinson	Bermuda	10.67	
15	3	Jonathan Padilla	Mexico	10.72	
16	3	Ethan Sam	Grenada	10.74	
17	2	Ian George	Grenada	10.78	
18	2	Eduardo Sánchez	Mexico	10.82	
19	1	Ronaldo Registre	Turks and Caicos Islands	10.92	
20	3	Amari Myrie	Cayman Islands	10.95	
21	3	Markey Zephirin	Turks and Caicos Islands	10.96	
22	2	Yahraya Doctrine	United States Virgin Islands	11.14	

Final – 10 July

Wind: +2.7 m/s

Rank	Lane	Name	Nationality	Time	Notes
1st place, gold medalist(s)	4	Bouwahjgie Nkrumie	Jamaica	9.92	
2nd place, silver medalist(s)	3	Damor Miller	Jamaica	10.03	
3rd place, bronze medalist(s)	8	Adrián Canales	Puerto Rico	10.08	
4	6	Zion Campbell	Bahamas	10.11	
5	5	Darren McQueen	Haiti	10.13	
6	7	Adam Musgrove	Bahamas	10.21	
7	2	Aaron Charles	Trinidad and Tobago	10.34	
8	1	Dwayne Fleming	Antigua and Barbuda	12.29	

=== 200 metres ===
Heats – 11 July
Wind:
Heat 1: +2.2 m/s, Heat 2: +2.6 m/s, Heat 3: +0.1 m/s

Rank	Heat	Name	Nationality	Time	Notes
1	3	Aaron Charles	Trinidad and Tobago	20.28	Q
2	2	Adrián Canales	Puerto Rico	20.40	Q
3	3	Jayden Green	Barbados	20.42	Q, NU20R
4	1	Shaquane Toussaint	Grenada	20.53	Q
5	2	Odaine Crooks	Jamaica	20.64	Q
6	1	Damor Miller	Jamaica	20.66	Q
7	1	Adam Musgrove	Bahamas	20.68	q
8	1	Darren McQueen	Haiti	20.75	q
9	2	Aragorn Straker	Barbados	20.78	
10	3	Yariel Pérez	Puerto Rico	21.01	
11	2	Carlos Fierro	Mexico	21.02	
12	1	Trenton Brooks	Anguilla	21.17	
13	3	Norre Robinson	Bermuda	21.40	
14	3	Mario Carter	British Virgin Islands	21.52	
15	2	Nazario Gumbs	Anguilla	21.68	
16	1	Franco González	Mexico	21.85	
17	3	Amari Myrie	Cayman Islands	22.05	
	1	Kasiya Daley	Antigua and Barbuda	DQ	TR17.3.4
	2	Ian George	Grenada	DQ	FS
	3	Dwayne Fleming	Antigua and Barbuda	DNS	
	3	Ronaldo Registre	Turks and Caicos Islands	DNS	

Final – 12 July

Wind: +3.5 m/s

Rank	Lane	Name	Nationality	Time	Notes
1st place, gold medalist(s)	4	Jayden Green	Barbados	20.17	
2nd place, silver medalist(s)	7	Aaron Charles	Trinidad and Tobago	20.19	
3rd place, bronze medalist(s)	6	Adrián Canales	Puerto Rico	20.39	
4	3	Odaine Crooks	Jamaica	20.45	
5	5	Shaquane Toussaint	Grenada	20.62	
6	8	Damor Miller	Jamaica	20.78	
7	1	Adam Musgrove	Bahamas	20.86 (20.858)	
8	2	Darren McQueen	Haiti	20.86 (20.860)	

=== 400 metres ===
Heats – 10 July

Rank	Heat	Name	Nationality	Time	Notes
1	1	Jasauna Dennis	Jamaica	46.06	Q
2	1	Alejandro Rosado	Puerto Rico	46.12	Q
3	2	Jarell Cruz	Puerto Rico	46.62	Q
4	2	Devonie Ferguson	Grenada	46.95	Q
5	1	Joshim Sylvester	Grenada	46.97	Q
6	2	Pablo Vargas	Mexico	47.18	Q
7	1	Javano Bridgewater	Bahamas	47.31	q
8	2	Shamari Greenidge-Lewis	Barbados	47.44	q
9	2	Andrew Styles	Bahamas	47.46	
10	1	Brandon Hinds	Barbados	48.21	
11	2	Miguel Valadez	Mexico	48.26	
12	2	Nazario Gumbs	Anguilla	48.66	
13	1	Milton Rodríguez	Nicaragua	48.83	
14	1	Adrián Averhoff	Guatemala	49.45	
	1	Braulio Fernández	Mexico	DNS	

Final – 11 July

Rank	Lane	Name	Nationality	Time	Notes
1st place, gold medalist(s)	7	Jasauna Dennis	Jamaica	45.33	
2nd place, silver medalist(s)	4	Jarell Cruz	Puerto Rico	45.76	
3rd place, bronze medalist(s)	6	Alejandro Rosado	Puerto Rico	45.77	
4	1	Shamari Greenidge-Lewis	Barbados	46.35	
5	8	Pablo Vargas	Mexico	46.76	
6	2	Javano Bridgewater	Bahamas	46.96	
7	3	Joshim Sylvester	Grenada	47.02	
	5	Devonie Ferguson	Grenada	DNF	

=== 800 metres ===
12 July

Rank	Name	Nationality	Time	Notes
1st place, gold medalist(s)	Amado Amador	Mexico	1:48.99	
2nd place, silver medalist(s)	Deangelo Brown	Grenada	1:50.49	
3rd place, bronze medalist(s)	Karol Picaso	Mexico	1:51.04	
4	Aaron Morris	Barbados	1:51.74	
5	Alexander Caines	Saint Kitts and Nevis	1:52.94	
6	Jahshani Farrington	British Virgin Islands	2:11.62	

=== 1500 metres ===
11 July

Rank	Name	Nationality	Time	Notes
1st place, gold medalist(s)	Miguel Santini	Puerto Rico	4:06.90	
2nd place, silver medalist(s)	Esteban Oses	Costa Rica	4:07.26	
3rd place, bronze medalist(s)	Víctor Pérez	Mexico	4:07.56	
4	Ricardo Amador	Mexico	4:08.91	
5	Tafari Waldron	Trinidad and Tobago	4:16.35	

=== 5000 metres ===
10 July

Rank	Name	Nationality	Time	Notes
1st place, gold medalist(s)	Aldair Rosales	Mexico	14:46.59	
2nd place, silver medalist(s)	Roberto Castro	Mexico	14:48.48	
3rd place, bronze medalist(s)	Esteban Oses	Costa Rica	15:38.68	
4	Emmanuel de León	Guatemala	16:16.51	
5	Tafari Waldron	Trinidad and Tobago	17:46.45	

=== 10,000 metres ===
12 July

Rank	Name	Nationality	Time	Notes
1st place, gold medalist(s)	Eduardo Pichardo	Mexico	31:32.46	
2nd place, silver medalist(s)	Víctor Ramírez	Mexico	31:56.57	
3rd place, bronze medalist(s)	Emmanuel de León	Guatemala	33:57.04	

=== 110 metres hurdles ===
11 July
Wind: +0.5 m/s

Rank	Lane	Name	Nationality	Time	Notes
1st place, gold medalist(s)	4	Shaquane Gordon	Jamaica	13.54	
2nd place, silver medalist(s)	6	Andre Harris	Jamaica	13.73	
3rd place, bronze medalist(s)	3	Tejaun Webbe	Saint Kitts and Nevis	14.26	
4	2	José Eduardo Aguado	Mexico	14.42	
5	7	Erick Reyes	Mexico	14.55	
	5	Tahj Brown	Bahamas	DNF	

=== 400 metres hurdles ===
11 July

Rank	Lane	Name	Nationality	Time	Notes
1st place, gold medalist(s)	5	Romario Stewart	Jamaica	50.21	
2nd place, silver medalist(s)	7	Yan Vázquez	Puerto Rico	50.24	
3rd place, bronze medalist(s)	6	Antonio Forbes	Jamaica	50.43	
4	2	Maximiliano Núñez	Mexico	50.90	
5	1	Rashad Gibson	Barbados	52.35	
6	8	Craig Prendergast	Antigua and Barbuda	53.24	
7	3	Juan Francisco Ibarra	Mexico	53.39	
8	4	Cheyne West	Trinidad and Tobago	1:01.67	

=== 3000 metres steeplechase ===
12 July

Rank	Name	Nationality	Time	Notes
1st place, gold medalist(s)	Alejandro Hernández	Mexico	9:45.15	
2nd place, silver medalist(s)	Paulo Gómez	Costa Rica	10:00.48	
	Christian Morales	Mexico	DNS	

=== 4 × 100 metres relay ===
11 July

Rank	Lane	Nation	Competitors	Time	Notes
1st place, gold medalist(s)	5	Jamaica	Bouwahjgie Nkrumie, Damor Miller, Odane Crooks, Andre Harris	39.30	
2nd place, silver medalist(s)	6	Bahamas	Samalie Farrington, Zion Campbell, Tahj Brown, Adam Musgrove	39.47	
3rd place, bronze medalist(s)	4	Barbados	Teon Haynes, Jayden Green, Amari Knight, Aragorn Straker	39.59	
4	3	Grenada	Ian George, Kanick Belfon-Nixon, Ethan Sam, Shaquane Toussaint	40.72	
5	7	Mexico	Ángel Ramírez, Carlos Fierro, Franco González, Luis Alejandro Rodríguez	41.32	
	8	Puerto Rico		DNS	

=== 4 × 400 metres relay ===
12 July

Rank	Lane	Nation	Competitors	Time	Notes
1st place, gold medalist(s)	8	Puerto Rico	Yariel Pérez, Alejandro Rosado, LeBron Bessick, Jarell Cruz	3:05.08	
2nd place, silver medalist(s)	5	Bahamas	Zion Shepherd, Javano Bridgewater, Sonycko Ilet, Andrew Styles	3:05.16	
3rd place, bronze medalist(s)	7	Barbados	Shamari Greenidge-Lewis, Aaron Morris, Brandon Hinds, Rashad Gibson	3:06.73	
5	6	Mexico	Braulio Fernández, Esteban Avena, Carlos Fierro, Amado Amador	3:58.37	(Note: Last leg runner injured)
	4	Jamaica		DNS	
	3	Grenada		DNS	

=== 5000 metres walk ===
11 July

Rank	Name	Nationality	Time	Notes
1st place, gold medalist(s)	Denis Estrada	Guatemala	21:30.85	CR
2nd place, silver medalist(s)	Lorenzo Dávila	Mexico	21:51.68	
3rd place, bronze medalist(s)	Lucien Beardsley	United States	22:44.67	
4	Gael Plasencia	United States	23:13.84	
5	Jonathan de la Cruz	Puerto Rico	23:33.55	
	Carlos González	Mexico	DNF	

=== High jump ===
12 July

Rank	Name	Nationality	1.80	1.85	1.90	1.95	2.00	2.05	2.08	2.11	2.14	Result	Notes
1st place, gold medalist(s)	Jesús Vázquez	Mexico	–	o	o	o	o	o	xo	o	xx	2.14	
2nd place, silver medalist(s)	J'Quan Samuels	Anguilla	–	–	o	o	xxo	o	xxx			2.08	NR
3rd place, bronze medalist(s)	Denceel Álvarez	Guatemala	o	o	o	o	xxo	xx				2.05	
4	Yagdier Rivera	Puerto Rico	–	o	o	o	xxx					2.00	
5	Ariel Molina	El Salvador	–	o	xxo	xxx						1.95	

=== Pole vault ===
12 July

Rank	Name	Nationality	3.80	3.95	4.10	4.20	4.30	4.40	4.50	4.60	4.70	4.80	4.90	Result	Notes
1st place, gold medalist(s)	Brenden Vanderpool	Bahamas	–	–	–	–	–	–	o	xo	o	o	xxx	4.80	
2nd place, silver medalist(s)	Tyler Cash	Bahamas	–	–	–	–	–	–	xo	o	xo	o	xxx	4.80	
3rd place, bronze medalist(s)	Ángel Hernández	Mexico	–	–	–	–	–	–	xo	–	o	xo	xxx	4.80	
4	Denzel Ponce	Costa Rica	–	–	o	–	xxo	o	xxx					4.40	
5	Yael León	Mexico	xo	o	xo	xxx								4.10	
6	Luis Ramírez	Mexico	xo	o	xxx									3.95	

=== Long jump ===
11 July

Rank	Name	Nationality	#1	#2	#3	#4	#5	#6	Result	Notes
1st place, gold medalist(s)	Uroy Ryan	Saint Vincent and the Grenadines	7.86	7.84	8.07	7.93	–	–	8.07	
2nd place, silver medalist(s)	Teon Haynes	Barbados	7.36	7.46	7.32	7.31	7.39	7.50	7.50	
3rd place, bronze medalist(s)	Zach Washington	Puerto Rico	7.33	7.14	7.20	7.16	7.29	7.16	7.33	
4	Samuel González	Mexico	x	7.03	7.20	–	5.00	6.84	7.20	
5	Pedro Valenzuela	Mexico	7.01	7.17	6.94	6.92	7.03	7.13	7.17	
6	J'Quan Samuels	Anguilla	6.38	6.40	5.80	–	–	–	6.40	
	Norberto Justiniano	Puerto Rico							DNS	

=== Triple jump ===
10 July

Rank	Name	Nationality	#1	#2	#3	#4	#5	#6	Result	Notes
1st place, gold medalist(s)	Antone Smith	Bahamas	x	x	16.06	15.75	–	–	16.06	
2nd place, silver medalist(s)	Fernando Reyes	El Salvador	15.32	15.25	15.38	14.11	–	x	15.38	
3rd place, bronze medalist(s)	Gael Chávez	Mexico	15.23	15.33	x	x	14.99	13.31	15.33	
4	Norberto Justiniano	Puerto Rico	x	15.21	15.20	x	13.33	x	15.21	
5	Jayden Maxwell	Trinidad and Tobago	x	14.77	x	14.99	x	x	14.99	
6	Pedro Valenzuela	Mexico	14.86	x	–	x	–	–	14.86	

=== Shot put ===
12 July

Rank	Name	Nationality	#1	#2	#3	#4	#5	#6	Result	Notes
1st place, gold medalist(s)	Jesús Guzmán	Mexico	17.09	16.75	x	17.25	x	18.02	18.02	
2nd place, silver medalist(s)	Despiro Wray	Jamaica	17.04	17.33	x	x	x	x	17.33	
3rd place, bronze medalist(s)	Alan Cabanellas	Puerto Rico	x	x	16.88	16.93	16.85	x	16.93	
4	Guillermo López	Puerto Rico	15.17	14.84	15.76	x	15.54	15.79	15.79	
5	Christopher Johnson	Antigua and Barbuda	15.35	x	15.55	15.72	x	15.73	15.73	

=== Discus throw ===
10 July

Rank	Name	Nationality	#1	#2	#3	#4	#5	#6	Result	Notes
1st place, gold medalist(s)	Joseph Salmon	Jamaica	53.56	54.29	55.08	56.41	55.79	57.19	57.19	
2nd place, silver medalist(s)	Nathan Villegas	Puerto Rico	52.82	54.53	54.79	52.76	x	x	54.79	
3rd place, bronze medalist(s)	Antonio Díaz	Mexico	46.71	48.40	49.83	48.47	46.72	x	49.83	
4	Jaylon Calder	Grenada	x	48.06	x	47.32	49.82	49.30	49.82	
5	Jesús Magaña	Mexico	x	46.72	x	x	49.60	x	49.60	
6	Andre Smikle	British Virgin Islands	x	x	46.43	x	x	46.94	46.94	

=== Hammer throw ===
12 July

Rank	Name	Nationality	#1	#2	#3	#4	#5	#6	Result	Notes
1st place, gold medalist(s)	Emilian Novelo	Mexico	50.97	50.78	52.90	x	x	51.04	52.90	
2nd place, silver medalist(s)	Andre Smikle	British Virgin Islands	46.18	x	x	47.63	47.80	46.35	47.80	
3rd place, bronze medalist(s)	José Eduardo Chávez	Mexico	29.40	x	–	x	–	–	29.40	

=== Javelin throw ===
10 July

Rank	Name	Nationality	#1	#2	#3	#4	#5	#6	Result	Notes
1st place, gold medalist(s)	Addison James	Dominica	72.02	65.85	x	x	67.93	67.55	72.02	
2nd place, silver medalist(s)	LeBron James	Trinidad and Tobago	66.26	68.44	64.89	67.53	69.24	67.66	69.24	
3rd place, bronze medalist(s)	Dorian Charles	Trinidad and Tobago	62.26	62.70	x	57.37	60.06	61.98	62.70	
	Emiliano Saucedo	Mexico							DNS	
	José Junior Ríos	Mexico							DNS	

=== Decathlon ===
July 10–11

The highest mark recorded in each event is highlighted in yellow

Rank	Name	Nationality	100m	LJ	SP	HJ	400m	110m H	DT	PV	JT	1500m	Points	Notes
1st place, gold medalist(s)	Abimelec Zamorano	Mexico	11.32	6.84	11.91	1.92	50.48	14.92	39.79	4.10	59.50	5:52.43	6882	
2nd place, silver medalist(s)	Osman Sanders	Nicaragua	11.19	6.10	9.25	1.71	50.56	16.32	29.55	3.50	43.14	5:52.07	5629	
3rd place, bronze medalist(s)	Iván Tonalli Cruz	Mexico	11.88	5.79	9.77	1.62	53.70	18.34	27.14	3.60	40.54	5:45.79	5006	
	Julio Jaramillo	Mexico	DNS	–	–	–	–	–	–	–	–	–	DNS	

== Women's results ==
=== 100 metres ===
Heats – 10 July
Wind:
Heat 1: +0.5 m/s, Heat 2: +0.7 m/s

Rank	Heat	Name	Nationality	Time	Notes
1	1	Lavanya Williams	Jamaica	11.32	Q
2	1	Frances Colón	Puerto Rico	11.48	Q
3	1	Miriam Sánchez	Mexico	11.51	Q
4	2	Geolyna Dowdye	Antigua and Barbuda	11.54	Q
5	1	Mariandrée Chacón	Guatemala	11.55	q
5	2	Alana Reid	Jamaica	11.55	Q
7	2	Kishawna Niles	Barbados	11.59	Q
8	1	Kerelle Etienne	Dominica	11.61	q
9	2	Shatalya Dorsett	Bahamas	11.63	
10	2	Matilde Ochoa	Mexico	11.72	
11	1	Aniya Nurse	Barbados	11.74	
12	2	Legna Echevarría	Puerto Rico	11.75	
13	1	Nicola Peters	United States Virgin Islands	12.20	

Final – 10 July

Wind: +2.1 m/s

Rank	Lane	Name	Nationality	Time	Notes
1st place, gold medalist(s)	4	Lavanya Williams	Jamaica	10.91	
2nd place, silver medalist(s)	3	Alana Reid	Jamaica	11.05	
3rd place, bronze medalist(s)	6	Frances Colón	Puerto Rico	11.23	
4	5	Geolyna Dowdye	Antigua and Barbuda	11.27	
5	7	Miriam Sánchez	Mexico	11.33	
6	2	Kishawna Niles	Barbados	11.41	
7	1	Mariandrée Chacón	Guatemala	11.46	
8	8	Kerelle Etienne	Dominica	11.67	

=== 200 metres ===
Heats – 11 July
Wind:
Heat 1: -0.1 m/s, Heat 2: -0.8 m/s

Rank	Heat	Name	Nationality	Time	Notes
1	2	Lavanya Williams	Jamaica	22.99	Q
2	1	Alana Reid	Jamaica	23.13	Q
3	2	Shatalya Dorsett	Bahamas	23.17	Q
4	1	Mariandrée Chacón	Guatemala	23.18	Q, NR
5	1	Kelia Bentham	Barbados	23.25	Q
6	2	Geolyna Dowdye	Antigua and Barbuda	23.30	Q
7	1	Miriam Sánchez	Mexico	23.32	q
8	2	Dianelis Rivera	Puerto Rico	23.99	q
9	1	Breanne Barnett	Haiti	24.01	
10	2	Alejandra Urias	Mexico	24.25	
11	2	Gloria Guerrier	Haiti	24.53	
12	1	Nicola Peters	United States Virgin Islands	24.94	

Final – 12 July

Wind: +3.0 m/s

Rank	Lane	Name	Nationality	Time	Notes
1st place, gold medalist(s)	6	Alana Reid	Jamaica	22.29	
2nd place, silver medalist(s)	5	Lavanya Williams	Jamaica	22.40	
3rd place, bronze medalist(s)	3	Kelia Bentham	Barbados	23.00	
4	7	Shatalya Dorsett	Bahamas	23.08	
5	2	Miriam Sánchez	Mexico	23.22	
6	8	Geolyna Dowdye	Antigua and Barbuda	23.30	
7	4	Mariandrée Chacón	Guatemala	23.41	
8	1	Dianelis Rivera	Puerto Rico	24.04	

=== 400 metres ===
Heats – 10 July

Rank	Heat	Name	Nationality	Time	Notes
1	1	Andrea Rivera	Puerto Rico	52.38	Q
2	2	Kadia Rock	Barbados	53.25	Q
3	1	Hannah Reid	Trinidad and Tobago	53.49	Q
4	1	Gloria Guerrier	Haiti	53.60	Q
4	2	Valeria Pineda	Mexico	53.60	Q
6	1	Alisson Martínez	Mexico	53.70	q
7	1	Twaneise Johnson	Barbados	53.91	q
8	2	Oneika Brissett	Jamaica	54.35	Q
9	2	Genesis Castro	Puerto Rico	55.29	
10	2	Kettia Ambrose	Antigua and Barbuda	55.69	
11	1	Kaliyah Jones	Saint Kitts and Nevis	56.72	
12	2	Breanne Barnett	Haiti	57.13	
13	1	Eljoenai Wehl	Aruba	1:01.01	

Final – 11 July

Rank	Lane	Name	Nationality	Time	Notes
1st place, gold medalist(s)	5	Andrea Rivera	Puerto Rico	51.52	
2nd place, silver medalist(s)	7	Kadia Rock	Barbados	51.92	NU20R
3rd place, bronze medalist(s)	4	Valeria Pineda	Mexico	52.72	
4	3	Oneika Brissett	Jamaica	52.73	
5	8	Gloria Guerrier	Haiti	53.20	
6	1	Twaneise Johnson	Barbados	53.34	
7	2	Alisson Martínez	Mexico	55.78	
	6	Hannah Reid	Trinidad and Tobago	DNF	

=== 800 metres ===
12 July

Rank	Name	Nationality	Time	Notes
1st place, gold medalist(s)	Layla Haynes	Barbados	2:07.86	
2nd place, silver medalist(s)	Luana Lewis	Jamaica	2:08.86	
3rd place, bronze medalist(s)	Georgina Sosa	Mexico	2:09.38	
4	Nisi Bautista	Mexico	2:11.20	
5	Ameiah Samuels	Grenada	2:11.28	
6	Antonella Lanuza	Costa Rica	2:19.00	
	Ashlyn Simmons	Barbados	DNS	

=== 1500 metres ===
11 July

Rank	Name	Nationality	Time	Notes
1st place, gold medalist(s)	Dafne Juárez	Mexico	4:39.81	
2nd place, silver medalist(s)	Aislinn Rojas	Mexico	4:49.20	
3rd place, bronze medalist(s)	Aniqah Bailey	Trinidad and Tobago	5:12.55	

=== 5000 metres ===
10 July

Rank	Name	Nationality	Time	Notes
1st place, gold medalist(s)	Dafne Juárez	Mexico	16:54.52	
2nd place, silver medalist(s)	Fatima Mena	Mexico	17:35.32	

=== 10,000 metres ===
12 July

Rank	Name	Nationality	Time	Notes
1st place, gold medalist(s)	Luz Rocha	Mexico	36:07.93	
2nd place, silver medalist(s)	Fatima Mena	Mexico	36:11.53	

=== 100 metres hurdles ===
11 July
Wind: +0.3 m/s

Rank	Lane	Name	Nationality	Time	Notes
1st place, gold medalist(s)	4	Alexis James	Jamaica	13.08	
2nd place, silver medalist(s)	3	Keishla García	Puerto Rico	13.53	
3rd place, bronze medalist(s)	1	Maya Rollins	Barbados	13.59	
4	6	Grace Otero	Puerto Rico	13.73	
5	2	Andrea Aguilera	Mexico	14.72	
6	7	Sofía Alejandre	Mexico	14.99	
7	5	Gianna Paul	Trinidad and Tobago	15.14	
	8	Nya Browne	Barbados	DNF	

=== 400 metres hurdles ===
11 July

Rank	Lane	Name	Nationality	Time	Notes
1st place, gold medalist(s)	8	Kelly Ann Carr	Jamaica	57.40	
2nd place, silver medalist(s)	6	Grace Otero	Puerto Rico	58.38	
3rd place, bronze medalist(s)	5	Mariangel Núñez	Costa Rica	1:00.45	
4	4	Angelica Nuño	Mexico	1:01.12	
5	3	Mireya Reyes	Mexico	1:02.77	
6	7	Ezthia Maycock	Bahamas	1:11.96	
7	2	Alondra Rodríguez	Puerto Rico	1:25.34	

=== 3000 metres steeplechase ===
12 July

Rank	Name	Nationality	Time	Notes
1st place, gold medalist(s)	Renata Muñoz	Mexico	11:23.43	
2nd place, silver medalist(s)	Areli Ayala	Mexico	11:46.37	

=== 4 × 100 metres relay ===
11 July

Rank	Lane	Nation	Competitors	Time	Notes
1st place, gold medalist(s)	4	Puerto Rico	Natalia Pagan, Darelis Domínguez, Legna Echevarría, Frances Colón	44.43	
2nd place, silver medalist(s)	3	Barbados	Nya Browne, Aniya Nurse, Kelia Bentham, Kishawna Niles	44.60	
3rd place, bronze medalist(s)	6	Mexico	America Trejo, Joselyn Araújo, Daniela Schulz, Nancy Alba	47.86	
	5	Jamaica		DNS	

=== 4 × 400 metres relay ===
12 July

Rank	Lane	Nation	Competitors	Time	Notes
1st place, gold medalist(s)	5	Puerto Rico	Grace Otero, Génesis Castro, Amanda Andino, Andrea Rivera	3:33.20	
2nd place, silver medalist(s)	4	Mexico	Luna Govea, Alisson Martínez, Georgina Sosa, Kenya Maturana	3:39.15	
	3	Jamaica		DNS	

=== 5000 metres walk ===
11 July

Rank	Name	Nationality	Time	Notes
1st place, gold medalist(s)	Renata Cortes	Mexico	23:50.30	
2nd place, silver medalist(s)	María Fernanda Santiago	Mexico	24:20.12	
3rd place, bronze medalist(s)	Aneth Siliézar	Guatemala	25:32.06	
4	Ashlyn Poulin	United States	26:03.63	

=== High jump ===
10 July

Rank	Name	Nationality	1.50	1.55	1.60	1.63	1.66	1.69	1.71	Result	Notes
1st place, gold medalist(s)	Stephany Martínez	Mexico	–	xo	o	o	xo	xo	xxx	1.69	
2nd place, silver medalist(s)	Jah'kyla Morton	British Virgin Islands	–	o	o	o	o	xxo	xxx	1.69	
3rd place, bronze medalist(s)	Ana Isabella González	El Salvador	–	–	o	o	xxo	xxo	xxx	1.69	
4	Eyxlin Telez	Mexico	o	xo	o	o	xo	xxx		1.66	

=== Pole vault ===
10 July

Rank	Name	Nationality	3.30	3.40	3.50	4.00	4.10	4.20	4.25	Result	Notes
1st place, gold medalist(s)	Andrea Velasco	Mexico	–	–	–	xxo	o	xxo	xxx	4.20	
2nd place, silver medalist(s)	Sandra Barbosa	Mexico	xo	o	xxx					3.40	

=== Long jump ===
11 July

Rank	Name	Nationality	#1	#2	#3	#4	#5	#6	Result	Notes
1st place, gold medalist(s)	Janae De Gannes	Trinidad and Tobago	6.26	6.58	x	6.21	–	x	6.58	
2nd place, silver medalist(s)	Paola del Real	Mexico	6.09	x	x	x	x	x	6.09	
3rd place, bronze medalist(s)	Gianna Paul	Trinidad and Tobago	x	5.34	5.57	5.47	5.59	5.95	5.95	
4	Legna Echevarría	Puerto Rico	5.64	x	5.56	5.47	5.94	5.80	5.94	
5	Valeria Uribe	Mexico	5.73	5.78	x	5.63	5.69	3.89w	5.78	
6	Koi Adderley	Bahamas	x	5.70	5.45	5.57	5.43	x	5.70	
7	Norian Velázquez	Puerto Rico	5.48	5.34	5.38	5.27	5.45	5.13	5.48	

=== Triple jump ===
12 July

Rank	Name	Nationality	#1	#2	#3	#4	#5	#6	Result	Notes
1st place, gold medalist(s)	Paola del Real	Mexico	13.21	13.29	x	x	x	x	13.29	
2nd place, silver medalist(s)	Keneisha Shelbourne	Trinidad and Tobago	13.18	x	13.17	x	11.60	13.16	13.18	
3rd place, bronze medalist(s)	Jade-Ann Dawkins	Jamaica	x	13.04	x	13.03	x	x	13.04	
4	Danisha Chimilio	Guatemala	12.12	x	12.60	x	12.39	12.84	12.84	
5	Valeria Uribe	Mexico	12.45	x	x	x	12.68	12.38	12.68	
6	Norian Velázquez	Puerto Rico	11.86	12.40	12.20	12.29	12.34	12.49	12.49	

=== Shot put ===
11 July

Rank	Name	Nationality	#1	#2	#3	#4	#5	#6	Result	Notes
1st place, gold medalist(s)	Brittannie Johnson	Jamaica	14.82	15.72	15.61	16.23	16.51	x	16.51	
2nd place, silver medalist(s)	Kimeka Smith	Jamaica	16.27	15.06	16.18	16.19	x	x	16.27	
3rd place, bronze medalist(s)	Ryah Dates	Barbados	14.83	x	15.26	14.66	14.68	x	15.26	
4	Andrea Vargas	Mexico	13.57	14.00	13.61	13.93	13.28	13.35	14.00	
5	Sofía Sánchez	Mexico	13.13	12.29	12.37	12.49	13.10	12.53	13.13	
6	Prizila Negrete	Honduras	11.98	12.31	x	12.09	12.29	12.26	12.31	
7	Kaylin Myrie	Costa Rica	9.56	10.12	11.37	11.44	10.25	x	11.44	
8	Luna Mora	Costa Rica	9.91	10.14	10.55	10.35	10.82	10.37	10.82	
9	Dayana Paz	Honduras	8.31	9.89	8.82				9.89	
	Lalenii Grant	Trinidad and Tobago							DNS	

=== Discus throw ===
10 July

Rank	Name	Nationality	#1	#2	#3	#4	#5	#6	Result	Notes
1st place, gold medalist(s)	Lalenii Grant	Trinidad and Tobago	49.14	50.50	x	48.52	50.41	53.72	53.72	
2nd place, silver medalist(s)	Brittannie Johnson	Jamaica	50.41	45.69	51.32	50.62	52.58	50.43	52.58	
3rd place, bronze medalist(s)	Brittannia Johnson	Jamaica	49.85	51.72	48.18	x	51.18	43.27	51.72	
4	María Elena Hernández	Mexico	x	42.66	44.07	46.98	44.14	44.98	46.98	
5	Johana Verdugo	Mexico	42.18	x	37.18	40.43	38.60	x	42.18	
6	Luna Mora	Costa Rica	34.37	35.31	38.56	37.75	38.16	x	38.56	
7	Kaylin Myrie	Costa Rica	38.24	38.20	35.86	x	37.90	x	38.24	
8	Prizila Negrete	Honduras	x	35.20	36.85	35.50	33.90	34.30	36.85	
9	Dayana Paz	Honduras	x	x	31.27				31.27	

=== Hammer throw ===
12 July

Rank	Name	Nationality	#1	#2	#3	#4	#5	#6	Result	Notes
1st place, gold medalist(s)	Yarielis Torres	Puerto Rico	x	x	58.83	58.41	64.05	56.64	64.05	
2nd place, silver medalist(s)	Elvia Canela	Mexico	x	60.39	59.39	61.14	60.12	x	61.14	
3rd place, bronze medalist(s)	Sophie Pérez	Guatemala	56.59	57.40	57.13	x	56.12	58.88	58.88	
4	Debora Rosado	Mexico	47.59	54.11	51.12	53.54	x	x	54.11	
5	Claudia Ugobono	Puerto Rico	51.25	51.29	47.06	52.28	50.48	50.97	52.28	
6	Brittannia Johnson	Jamaica	x	52.28	x	x	x	50.49	52.28	

=== Javelin throw ===
12 July

Rank	Name	Nationality	#1	#2	#3	#4	#5	#6	Result	Notes
1st place, gold medalist(s)	Taysha Stubbs	Bahamas	47.85	46.31	50.36	x	x	46.68	50.36	
2nd place, silver medalist(s)	Suerena Alexander	Grenada	47.89	x	44.97	46.66	x	46.69	47.89	
3rd place, bronze medalist(s)	Alexia Beltrán	Mexico	41.02	45.17	46.88	39.95	44.22	44.44	46.88	
4	Ivita Schizas	Puerto Rico	43.72	43.22	42.67	43.29	41.31	41.28	43.72	
5	Kamera Strachan	Bahamas	42.65	x	x	x	x	43.02	43.02	
6	Anna Paula Arredondo	Mexico	37.76	x	39.40	x	36.19	31.52	39.40	

=== Heptathlon ===
11–12 July

The highest mark recorded in each event is highlighted in yellow

Rank	Name	Nationality	100m H	HJ	SP	200m	LJ	JT	800m	Points	Notes
1st place, gold medalist(s)	Valeria Gutiérrez	Mexico	14.69	1.66	8.66	25.11	5.38	29.29	2:23.31	4915	
2nd place, silver medalist(s)	Ana Isabella González	El Salvador	14.14	1.69	10.13	25.89	5.14	23.79	2:22.43	4895	
3rd place, bronze medalist(s)	Tenique Vincent	Trinidad and Tobago	14.18	1.69	11.04	24.64	5.55	32.42	3:04.18	4878	
4	Katia Uribe	Mexico	14.28	1.66	10.75	DQ	5.48	45.88	2:30.65	4483	

== Mixed results ==
=== 4 × 100 metres relay ===
12 July

Rank	Lane	Nation	Competitors	Time	Notes
1st place, gold medalist(s)	3	Puerto Rico	Ángel Márquez, Enith Maysonet, Adrián Canales, Frances Colón	41.92	CR
2nd place, silver medalist(s)	5	Bahamas	Samalie Farrington, Shatalya Dorsett, Zion Campbell, Ezthia Maycock	42.71	
3rd place, bronze medalist(s)	4	Barbados	Aragorn Straker, Aniya Nurse, Amari Knight, Nya Browne	42.93	
	6	Mexico	Ángel Ramírez, Nancy Alba, Luis Alejandro Rodríguez, Joselyn Araújo	DNF	

=== 4 × 400 metres relay ===
10 July

Rank	Lane	Nation	Competitors	Time	Notes
1st place, gold medalist(s)	7	Jamaica	Antonio Forbes, Oneika Brissett, Jasauna Dennis, Leanna Lewis	3:22.36	
2nd place, silver medalist(s)	4	Puerto Rico	LeBron Bessick, Amanda Andino, Yan Vázquez, Darelis Domínguez	3:26.91	
3rd place, bronze medalist(s)	8	Mexico	Juan Francisco Ibarra, Susana Montes, Esteban Avena, Kenya Maturana	3:27.99	
	5	Barbados		DNS	
	6	Grenada		DNS	
