= Deandre Daley =

Jamaican athlete (born 2005)

Personal information
- Nationality: Jamaican
- Born: 8 February 2005 (age 21) St. James, Jamaica

Sport
- Sport: Athletics
- Event: Sprint
- Club: Uptimum Track Club
- Coached by: Shanikie Osbourne; Claude Grant

Achievements and titles
- Personal bests: 60m: 6.65 (2026); 100m: 10.08 (2023); 200m: 21.62 (2022)
Medal record
Men's athletics
Representing Jamaica
World U20 Championships
| Gold medal – first place | 2024 Lima | 4×100 m relay |
CARIFTA Games Junior (U20)
| Gold medal – first place | 2022 Kingston | 100m |
| Gold medal – first place | 2022 Kingston | 4x100m relay |
| Gold medal – first place | 2023 Nassau | 4x100m relay |

Deandre Daley (born 8 February 2005) is a Jamaican sprinter.

== Career ==
2022

He won gold in the 100 metres at the 2022 CARIFTA Games in Kingston, Jamaica. However, he missed the 2022 World U20 Championships due to injury.

== 2023 ==
He ran a personal best 10.14 seconds for the 100m in the 2023 ISSA/GraceKennedy Boys and Girls’ Athletics Championships. He won gold in the 4 × 100 m relay at the 2023 CARIFTA Games in Nassau, Bahamas after being disqualified from the individual 100m due to a false start. He lowered his personal best to 10.08 seconds for the 100 metres in 2023.

== 2024 ==
He was runner-up in the 100m at the Jamaican junior championships in Kingston in July 2024. He qualified for the final at the 2024 World Athletics U20 Championships in the 100 metres, placing fourth overall. Later in the championships he ran a crucial anchor leg to win gold in the 4 x 100 metres relay.

== 2025 ==
Daley went professional, signed a contract with Adidas, and continued to train with his high school coach Claude Grant.

== 2026 ==
Daley ran a personal best 6.65 seconds for the 60 metres (+1.1) at the 2026 Gibson McCook Relays in Kingston.

== Personal life ==
He attended Herbert Morrison Technical High in Montego Bay.
