= He Jinxian =

Chinese athlete (born 2006)

Personal information
- Nationality: Chinese
- Born: 13 November 2006 (age 19)

Sport
- Sport: Athletics
- Event: Sprint

Achievements and titles
- Personal best(s): 60m: 6.75 (2024); 100m: 10.06 (2024) NU20R; 200m: 21.53 (2024)

He Jinxian (born 13 November 2006) is a Chinese sprinter. He is the national under-20 record holder over 100 metres and became national senior champion at the Chinese Athletics Championships in the 100 metres in 2024.

== Biography ==
He is from East China's Fujian Province. He ran a personal best 10.06 seconds for the 100 metres to win the senior Chinese national title at the Chinese Athletics Championships in June 2024. He finished eighth in the final at the 2024 World Athletics U20 Championships in the 100 metres in Lima, Peru in August 2024.

He competed for China in the 100 metres at the 2025 Asian Athletics Championships in Gumi, South Korea. In September 2025, he competed in the men's 4 x 100 metres at the 2025 World Championships in Tokyo, Japan.

In May 2026, he ran at the 2026 World Athletics Relays in the men's 4 × 100 metres relay in Gaborone, Botswana.
