= Jayden Green =

Barbadian athlete

Personal information
- Born: 15 January 2007 (age 19)

Sport
- Sport: Athletics
- Event: Sprint
Medal record
Men's athletics
Representing Barbados
NACAC U23 Championships
Gold medal – first place	2026 Tlaxcala	200 m
Bronze medal – third place	2026 Tlaxcala	4x100 m relay
World U20 Championships
Bronze medal – third place	2026 Eugene	200m

Jayden Green (born 15 January 2007) is a Barbadian sprinter.

== Biography ==
In July 2026, Green won the 200 metres at the Barbados Grand Prix, claiming victory in a personal best 20.46 seconds. Later that month, Green won the gold medal over 200 metres at the 2026 NACAC U23 Championships in Mexico, running a wind-assisted time of 20.17 seconds.

Competing at the 2026 World Athletics U20 Championships in Eugene, Oregon, he became the second Barbadian to have qualified for the final of the 200 metres at the Championships, qualifying third-fastest for the final with a time of 20.46 seconds and subsequently winning the bronze medal in the final behind American pair Tate Taylor and Blake Hamilton.
