= Dillon Mitchell (sprinter) =

American sprinter (born 2009)

Personal information
- Born: 4 December 2009 (age 16)

Sport
- Sport: Athletics
- Event: Sprint

Achievements and titles
- Personal bests: 60m: 6.59 (New York, 2026) U18WB; 100m: 10.10 (Austin, 2026)
Medal record
Men's athletics
Representing United States
World U20 Championships
Gold medal – first place	2026 Eugene	4×100 m relay

Dillon Mitchell (born 4 December 2009) is an American sprinter. Competing as a 16 year-old at the senior 2026 USA Indoor Track and Field Championships, Mitchell qualified for the final of the 60 metres, running an under-18 world best time of 6.59 seconds.

== Biography ==
=== Early and personal life ===
From Houston, Texas, his mother Karen was a high school track athlete and his father Billy played at the college level for Texas A&M Aggies football and was on the roster of the Carolina Panthers. His older brother Will Mitchell plays football at Texas State University. Mitchell was coached in sprinting by his father Billy from the age of four years-old. Mitchell attends C.E. King High School in Harris County, Texas.

=== Track career ===
A dual football and track athlete and a member of Track Houston Youth TC, in 2025 he ran a championship record 10.41 for the 100 metres in the 15-16 age-group at the USATF Junior Olympics. As a 15-year-old Mitchell ran a wind-assisted 10.07 seconds for the 100 metres at the Region 3-6A Track Meet, and placed second to Brayden Williams at the 2025 USA U20 Championships 100 metres final in Eugene, Oregon in 10.28 seconds (+0.5 m/ps).

Competing over 60 metres at the 2026 USA Indoor Track and Field Championships in New York in February 2026, Mitchell finished second in his heat behind Trayvon Bromell, in an under-18 world record of 6.59 seconds, breaking the record by 0.05 seconds from previous record holder Tate Taylor, before placing seventh in the final in 6.60 seconds. A few days later, competing at the Texas A&M Bluebonnet Invitational, Mitchell ran a wind-aided 9.88 seconds over 100 metres. Mitchell won against Tate Taylor and Jake Odey-Jordan in the 60 m at the Nike Indoor Nationals in March 2026. The following month, Mitchell became the fifth fastest U18 man in history running a wind-legal 10.10 in the prelims of the 100 m at the Texas Relays in Austin. The following month, he won the Texas 6A state 100 metres in a wind-assisted 9.92 seconds (+4.0). In June, he placed third in the 100 metres at the 2026 USATF U20 Championships. He won a gold medal with the men's 4 x 100 metres relay at the 2026 World Athletics U20 Championships in a new world U20 record of 38.16 seconds, surpassing the previous best set by South Africa in winning the title in 2021.
