= Brayden Williams =

American track and field athlete (born 2007)

Personal information
- Born: April 2, 2007 (age 19)
- Education: Duncanville High School

Sport
- Country: United States
- Sport: Athletics
- Event(s): 100 m, 200 m

Achievements and titles
- Personal bests: 60 m: 6.62i (New York City, New York 2025); 100 m: 9.82w (Waco, Texas 2025); 200 m: 21.08w (Dallas, Texas 2025)

Brayden Dashun Williams (born April 2, 2007) is an American track and field athlete who holds the best U.S. High School 100 meters time in all conditions.

== Career ==
Williams began his high school track career at Waxahachie High School, where he ran 10.72 in the 100 meters as a freshman. He also competed on a 4×100 meter team which ran 40.84, one of the fastest times in the state that year.

During Williams' sophomore season in 2023, he transferred to Duncanville High School, whose program was held in high regard and had notably run 40.98 in the 4x100 the year prior. Williams achieved a notable personal record of a wind-legal 10.52 in the 100m.

In 2024, Williams gained national recognition when he ran a wind legal 10.14 at the USATF National Junior Olympic Track & Field Championships. This was the third fastest wind-legal time in state history, only behind Matthew Boling and Derrick Florence. This same year, Williams also was the first leg in Duncanville's historic 1:22.25 4×200 meter relay, which lowered the national record by a full second. On November 9, 2024, Williams would announce his college commitment to the University of Georgia.

On March 8, 2025, Williams ran a wind-aided 9.99 seconds in the 100 meters, becoming the fourth U.S. high school athlete to break 10 seconds under any conditions. This gave him elite status, alongside Trayvon Bromell, Matthew Boling, and Christian Miller. (Note: Issam Asinga had also broken 10 seconds as a high schooler the year prior, but had his records removed after he was caught using an illegal performance enhancing drug.)

On April 18 of that same year, Williams would run 9.82 seconds in the 100 meter event at his regional meet. This is currently the fastest time run by a high schooler in U.S. history in all conditions. The wind reading for the race was +6.0, which is three times the allowable limit for official records, but the performance was still held in national regard, as it made Williams the fastest U.S. high school sprinter of all time.

In June 2025, he was third at the Nike Nationals Outdoor championships 100 metres in 10.17 seconds, finishing behind Tate Taylor and Maurice Gleaton. That month, Williams won the 2025 USA U20 Championships 100 metres final in Eugene, Oregon in 10.25 seconds (+0.5 m/ps) ahead of Dillon Mitchell.
