= William Trulsson =

Swedish athlete (born 2006)

Personal information
- Nationality: Swedish
- Born: 19 February 2006 (age 20)

Sport
- Sport: Athletics
- Event: Sprint

Achievements and titles
- Personal best(s): 200m: 20.79 (2025); 400m: 46.47 (2024)
Medal record
Men's athletics
Representing Sweden
European Youth Olympic Festival
Gold medal – first place	2022 Banská Bystrica	200m

William Trulsson (born 19 February 2006) is a Swedish sprinter. In 2025, he became European U20 record holder over 200 metres indoors.

== Career ==
He is a member of Malmö AI and predominantly races over 200 metres and 400 metres. He became Swedish senior national champion over 200 metres for the first time in 2022, at the age of 16 years-old.

In 2024, competing indoors in Växjö, he ran 400 meters in 47.04, beating Carl Bengtström's previous Swedish junior record by 13 hundredths of a second. He came third in the Swedish indoor championships in Karlstad in the 200m with a time of 21.08, an indoor personal best which placed him second all-time for a Swedish junior athlete. He finished fourth in the 200m at the 2024 World Athletics U20 Championships in Lima, Peru in August 2024, the best ever placement by a Swedish male sprinter at the event.

He ran 20.69 seconds to set a European U20 indoor record for the 200m at the Swedish Indoor Championships in February 2025. The following month, he won the 60 metres at the Swedish U20 Indoor Championships. He was a semi-finalist at the 2025 European Athletics U20 Championships but suffered a season-ending calf injury in winning his heat at the championships in Tampere.
