= Ylann Bizasene =

French athlete (born 2006)

Personal information
- Born: 19 April 2006 (age 20) Baie-Mahault, Guadeloupe
- Height: 180 cm (5 ft 11 in)
- Weight: 79 kg (174 lb)

Sport
- Country: France
- Sport: Athletics
- Event: Sprint

Achievements and titles
- Personal bests: 60m: 6.72 (2024); 100m: 10.25 (2025); 200m: 21.24 (2024)
Medal record
Men's athletics
Representing France
European U20 Championships
Gold medal – first place	2025 Tampere	4x100 m relay
European Youth Olympic Festival
Gold medal – first place	2023 Maribor	100m
Gold medal – first place	2023 Maribor	Medley relay
Silver medal – second place	2022 Banská Bystrica	100m

Ylann Bizasene (born 19 April 2006) is a French sprinter from Guadeloupe. A successful junior, he competed for the senior French team at the 2025 European Athletics Team Championships.

== Biography ==
From Gaudeloupe, Bizasene trained as a member of Stade Lamentinois. He jumped over 7 metres in the long jump at the age of 14 years-old, and later also competed in the sprint events in the Caribbean at the CARIFTA Games.

Bizasene won the silver medal in the 100 metres at the 2022 European Youth Summer Olympic Festival in Banská Bystrica, Slovakia. He set a French U16 record for the 60 metres in 2023 and also won the long jump at the French U18 Indoor Championships in February 2023. He won gold in the 100 metres at the 2023 European Youth Summer Olympic Festival in Maribor, Slovenia, after setting a new EYOF record with a time of 10.44 in his heat. He also won gold in the medley relay at the Festival.

Bizasene lowered his personal best for the 100 metres to 10.25 seconds in 2025. He was a member of the French 4 x 100 metres relay team at the 2025 European Athletics Team Championships in Madrid in June 2025. Competing in the 100 metres at the 2025 European Athletics U20 Championships in Tampere, Finland, he won his semi-final in 10.35 seconds (-0.5m/s), before placing fourth in the final in 10.50 seconds (-0.7). He was then a member of the French team's gold medal winning 4x100m relay men's team.

Bizasene finished fourth in the 60 metres at the 2026 French Indoor Athletics Championships in Aubiere, running 6.70 seconds in the final. In May, he ran at the 2026 World Athletics Relays in the mixed 4 × 100 metres relay. He also ran in the men's 4 × 100 metres relay at the championships in Gaborone, Botswana.
