= Gary Card =

Jamaican athlete (born 2007)

Personal information
- Nationality: Jamaican
- Born: 4 June 2007 (age 19) Kingston, Jamaica

Sport
- Sport: Athletics
- Event: Sprint
- College team: UTech
- Coached by: Stephen Francis; Paul Francis

Achievements and titles
- Personal bests: 60m: 6.52 (Kingston, 2026) AU20R; 100m: 9.93 (Kingston, 2026) NU20R; 200m: 20.28 (Budapest, 2026)
Medal record
Men's athletics
Representing Jamaica
World U20 Championships
Gold medal – first place	2024 Lima	4×100 m relay
Silver medal – second place	2026 Eugene	100m
Bronze medal – third place	2026 Eugene	4×100 m relay
CARIFTA Games (U20)
Gold medal – first place	2024 St George's	200 m
Silver medal – second place	2024 St George's	4x100 m relay
Silver medal – second place	2022 Kingston	100 m

Gary Card (born 4 June 2007) is a Jamaican sprinter. In 2026, he set a new Jamaican under-20 national record for the 100 metres in finishing runner-up at the Jamaican Athletics Championships.

== Biography ==
At the 2024 ISSA Boys and Girls Championships, Card finished second running the 200 metres in 21.23 seconds. He ran a strong curve, but lost momentum down the straight, and was passed at the line. The medalists crossed the line separated by 0.01 over each other.

== 2024 ==
Card won the gold medal over 200 metres at the 2024 CARIFTA Games, after winning the CARIFTA Trials by a length in a personal best time of 20.79 the month before. He also won a silver medal in the 4 × 100 m relay. Card won the 100 metres at the Jamaican U20 National Trials in Kingston, running a personal best time of 10.07 seconds in July 2024. This time placed him second on the Jamaican U20 all-time list. He subsequently qualified for the final at the 2024 World Athletics U20 Championships in the 100 metres, in which he placed sixth overall. Later at the Championships he won gold in the 4 x 100 metres relay.

== 2025 ==
In February 2025, Card won the 100 metres in 10.21 at the 2025 Jamaica Athletics Administrative Association (JAAA) Carifta Trials. Card lowered his personal best for the 100 metres to 10.06 seconds in the semifinal, and then ran 10.27 seconds to win at the 2025 Jamaica's ISSA Boys’ and Girls’ Championships in March 2025 while hopping across the finish line. Due to injury concerns, he withdrew from the 2025 CARIFTA Games.

== 2026 ==
Card ran a personal best 6.52 seconds for the 60 metres (+1.4) at the 2026 Gibson McCook Relays in Kingston. In April 2026, in Philadelphia, Card ran a personal best 10.03 seconds in the heats of the College Championship of America 100 metres. On 19 June, he finished runner-up to Oblique Seville in the 100 metres final at the senior Jamaican Athletics Championships, with a time of 9.93 seconds. The time set a new Jamaican national U20 record and moved him to joint-third on the world U20 all-time list. On 14 July, Card moved to second on the Jamaican under-list for the 200 metres behind Usain Bolt, with 20.28 seconds at the István Gyulai Memorial, in Budapest. On 6 August, he placed second in the final of the 100 metres at the 2026 World Athletics U20 Championships in Eugene, United States. He was later also a finalist in the 200 metres at the Games, placing sixth overall.

== Personal life ==
Card attended Wolmer's Boys School in Kingston, Jamaica. He has trained with Stephen Francis and the MVP Club since high school, with Francis himself an alumni and former head coach at the school. Card later attended University of Technology, Jamaica.
