= Jake Odey-Jordan =

British athlete

Personal information
- Nationality: British
- Born: 22 December 2007 (age 18) Hackney, London, UK
- Height: 6'0

Sport
- Sport: Athletics
- Event: Sprint

Achievements and titles
- Personal bests: 100 m: 10.01 (2026) EU20R; 200 m: 20.33 (2026); 60 m: 6.70 (2026)
Medal record
Men's athletics
Representing Great Britain
World U20 Championships
Silver medal – second place	2024 Lima	4×100 m relay
Silver medal – second place	2026 Eugene	4×100 m relay
Bronze medal – third place	2024 Lima	200 m

Jake Odey-Jordan (born 22 December 2007) is a British sprinter. In 2026, he set a new European under-20 record in the 100 metres. He won the bronze medal at the 2024 U20 World Championships over 200 metres.

== Early life ==
He was born in Hackney, East London, and lived in Essex, London. He attended St. Vincent Pallotti High School in Laurel, Maryland, and during the 2023 outdoor season recorded a win in the Freshman 200 at New Balance Outdoor Nationals. He then moved to the Archbishop Carroll High School in Washington, D.C., for their superior track facilities.

== Career ==
Competing at the New Balance Indoors Championships in March 2024, he won the 200 metres in 20.66 seconds and was part of the winning 4 × 200 m relay team. In the spring of 2024, he set a new 100 metres personal best in 10.38 seconds. He later lowered his 200 metres personal best to 20.55 seconds.

He competed at the 2024 European Athletics U18 Championships in Slovakia in July 2024. Whilst leading his 200 metres qualification heat by a significant distance, he slowed down dramatically and was overtaken before the line and did not progress. After the race, he said he admitted he was at fault and "so I cannot be sad about anything but myself".

He was the bronze medalist over 200 metres at the 2024 World Athletics U20 Championships in Lima, Peru. Later at the Championships, he won silver in the 4 x 100 metres relay.

In October 2024, he was nominated by Athletics Weekly for best British male junior. In November 2024, he was named by British Athletics on the Olympic Futures Programme for 2025. On the same day he signed with WME marketing Agency. In December 2024, he signed a Name, Image and Likeness (NIL) contract with New Balance.

In July 2025, he was second behind Teddy Wilson in the 100 metres and third in the 200 m behind Wilson and Ebuka Nwokeji at the UK Athletics U20 Championships. He was named in the British team for the 200 metres at the 2025 European Athletics U20 Championships in Tampere, qualifying for the final in 21.28 seconds but later withdrew. In October 2025, he was retained on the British Athletics Olympic Futures Programme for 2025/26.

On 17 January 2026, he ran the second fastest indoors 300m time in American high-school history with 32:63 behind Tate Taylor at the VA Showcase. The time also set a British record at the less-commonly run distance, surpassing Robert Tobin's mark set in 2006. He became the Nike Indoor Nationals 200 champion. In April, he broke his own British record for 300 m at the Miramar Invitational, running 32.43. Later that month, Odey-Jordan ran a wind-assisted 9.94 (+3.3) for the 100 metres in Gainesville, Florida, faster than the European U20 all-conditions record for the 100 metres previously held by Mark Lewis-Francis. Running over 200 m at the same meeting, he ran a wind-legal personal best of 20.33 to move to fifth on the European U20 all-time list, earning a victory over two-time world 100m medallist Trayvon Bromell. On 17 May 2026, he ran a 100 m personal best of 10.07 s (+1.6) at the Golden Grand Prix in Tokyo, placing third in 10.09 in the final behind Noah Lyles and Tate Taylor. The time moved him to equal fourth on the European U20 all-time list. Competing in Eugene at the Nike Outdoor Nationals the following month, he set a new European under-20 record with 10.01 seconds for the 100 metres, surpassing the 2009 record of Christophe Lemaitre. He was selected as part of the Great Britain team to compete at the 2026 World Athletics U20 Championships. On 6 August, he placed fifth in the final of the 100 metres race at the 2026 World Athletics U20 Championships in Eugene, United States.
