= Naoki Nishioka =

Japanese athlete (born 2006)

Personal information
- Born: 19 July 2006 (age 19)

Sport
- Sport: Athletics
- Event: Sprint

Achievements and titles
- Personal best(s): 60 m: 6.59 s (Osaka, 2025) NU20R; 100 m: 10.11 s (Fukuoka, 2024)

Naoki Nishioka (born 19 July 2006) is a Japanese sprinter. In 2025, he became Japanese national champion in the 60 metres, at the age of 18 years-old.

== Early life ==
He is from Osaka. In March 2025, he graduated from Tokai University Osaka Ohsho High School. He is committed to start studying at Tsukuba University in April 2025.

== Career ==
In 2024, he ran 10.11 seconds for the 100 metres at the National Inter-High School Championships. He finished fifth in the 100 metres final at the 2024 World Athletics U20 Championships in Lima, Peru, having qualified for the final by winning his semi-final in a time of 10.27 seconds.

He won the Japanese national title over 60 metres in February 2025, at the age of 18 years-old, equalling the U20 Japan record of 6.59 seconds held by Yoshihide Kiryu. He competed in the 60 metres at the 2025 World Athletics Indoor Championships in Nanjing in March 2025, where he reached the semi-finals.

He competed at the 2025 World Athletics Relays in China in the Men's 4 × 100 metres relay in May 2025. During the competition he helped Japan secure a qualifying place for the upcoming World Championships and place fourth overall.
