= Sebastian Sultana =

Australian athlete (born 2005)

Personal information
- Nationality: Australian
- Born: 15 September 2005 (age 21)

Sport
- Sport: Athletics
- Event: Sprint

Achievements and titles
- Personal bests: 100m: 10.11 (Perth, 2025)
Medal record
Men's athletics
Representing AUS
Oceania Championships
Silver medal – second place	2024 Suva	100 m

Sebastian Sultana (born 15 September 2005) is an Australian sprinter. In 2024 he became Australian national champion over 100 metres.

== Early life ==
Sebastian Sultana is from Schofields in Sydney in New South Wales and attended St John XXIII Catholic College. He graduated as part of the class of 2022.

== Career ==
In July 2023 Sultana set a new Australian under-18 100 metres record with a run of 10.27 seconds in Sydney.

In April 2024, he set a new 100m personal best time of 10.17 seconds to qualify for the final of the Australian Athletics Championships in Adelaide. In the final he ran a time of 10.27 seconds to win the Australian national title into a -1.2 metres per second headwind.

He ran as part of the Australian 4 × 100 m relay team which qualified for the 2024 Paris Olympics at the 2024, however he was unable to run due to injuries. World Relays Championships in Nassau, Bahamas. In June 2024, he was a silver medalist in the 100 metres at the 2024 Oceania Athletics Championships. He was named in the Australian team for the 2024 World Athletics U20 Championships in Lima.

He was awarded a Sport Australia Hall of Fame awards scholarship in September 2024.

He ran a personal best 10.11 seconds for the 100 metres at the Perth Classic on 1 March 2025.

Sebastian also coaches at The Ponds Little Athletics Centre.

== Personal life ==
Sebastian is currently studying a Bachelor of Exercise and Sport Science at the Australian Catholic University. He has Maltese heritage through his father.
