= Tate Taylor (sprinter) =

American sprinter

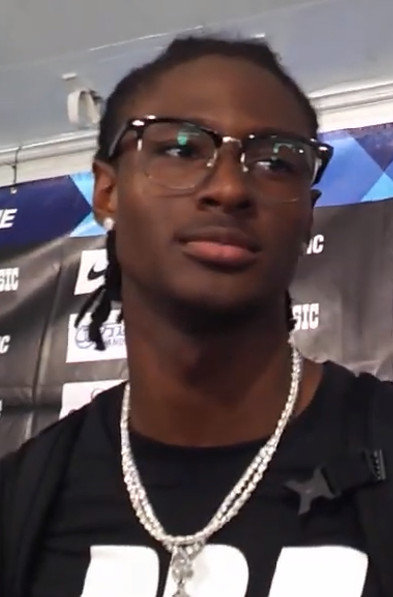
- Taylor in 2026

Personal information
- Born: September 26, 2007 (age 19)

Sport
- Sport: Athletics
- Event: Sprint

Achievements and titles
- Personal bests: 60 m: 6.64 (New York 2025); 100 m: 9.94 (Eugene 2026); 200 m: 19.75 (Eugene 2026)
Medal record
Men's athletics
Representing United States
World U20 Championships
Gold medal – first place	2026 Eugene	100m
Gold medal – first place	2026 Eugene	200m
Gold medal – first place	2026 Eugene	4×100m

Tate Taylor (born September 26, 2007) is an American sprinter from San Antonio, Texas. He is the world under-20 champion in the 100 metres and 200 metres.

== Career ==
=== 2022–2024 ===
As a high school freshman at John Marshall Harlan High School in San Antonio in 2023, Taylor ran 10.59 seconds in the 100 metres, albeit with a +3.6 m/s wind. The following year, he ran 6.75 indoors for the 60 meters and 21.05 for the 200 meters, placing 5th in both events at the New Balance Indoor Nationals. Outdoors, Taylor improved to 10.28 seconds with a -1.2 m/s wind, finishing runner-up in the 100 meters at the UIL State 6A Track and Field Championships. He also placed 4th in the 200 meters in 21.15 and ran anchor for the 5th placed 4 x 100 meters team (40.09). That year, he finished runner-up in the 200 metres at the national high school championships. In July 2024, running for San Antonio Swift Track Club, he won the 200m final at the USATF National Junior Olympics. Running into a strong headwind, Taylor managed to win with a personal-best effort of 20.66 seconds (-1.3 m/s).

=== 2025 ===
In March 2025, at the boys indoor 200m final at Nike Indoor National Championships he ran 20.46 seconds for the 200 metres, to set a new high school national indoor record, eclipsing the previous mark of 20.48 seconds set by Issam Asinga at the 2023 New Balance Nationals Indoor. It also broke the Armory High School meet record of 20.63 seconds, previously held by Noah Lyles in 2016. Taylor also finished runner-up in the 60 metres race, in a time of 6.64 seconds.

He broke the ten-second barrier for the 100 metres running 9.92 seconds at the UIL State 6A Track and Field Championships on May 3, 2025 (+1.1 m/s). The time moved him to second on the all-time U20 sprinter list worldwide, with the only athlete faster in this age group being Letsile Tebogo from Botswana who ran 9.91 seconds as a teenager, eclipsed the American record set by Christian Miller in 2024 of 9.93 seconds and made him the youngest person to have broken the ten-second barrier (at the age of 17 years, 7 months and 7 days). At the same meeting, Taylor also won the 200 metres with a 20.14 seconds finishing time, setting a Texas high school state record but fell 0.01 seconds short of Roy Martin's national high school record of 20.13 seconds, set in 1985. Taylor explained after the race that he elected to shut it down and coast across the line because he felt a minor twinge in his hamstring.

In June 2025, he won the Nike Outdoor Nationals championships 100 metres in 10.10 seconds, 0.01 seconds ahead of Maurice Gleaton.

He entered the 100 metres and 200 metres at the senior USA Track and Field Championships held in Eugene, Oregon in 2025. He reached the semi-finals of the 100 metres.

=== 2026 ===
On January 17, 2026, Taylor ran the fastest indoors 300m time in American high-school history with 32.45 ahead Jake Odey-Jordan, who also ran below the old national best time, at the VA Showcase. In April at the Tom Jones Invitational in Gainesville, Florida Taylor ran the 200 m in 20.05 seconds to break the high school record set by Noah Lyles of 20.09. On June 6, he ran 19.97 seconds for the 200 metres to move to sixth on the all-time world under-20 list, at the USATF Lone Star Grand Prix in College Station, Texas. On June 18, he won the 100 metres title at the 2026 USATF U20 Championships. In the 200 metres final on June 19, Taylor ran 19.94 seconds to win ahead of Blake Hamilton. On July 4, Taylor ran a personal best 19.75 seconds (-0.9) into a headwind from lane 3 to win the 200 metres at the 2026 Prefontaine Classic, winning ahead of Olympic champion Letsile Tebogo. This time moved him to third on the world U20 all-time list. On 5 August, he reached the final of the 100 metres race at the 2026 World Athletics U20 Championships in Eugene, United States, running 10.06 seconds. He won the final in a personal best 9.94 seconds, the first American to win the title since Noah Lyles in 2016. The time moved him to joint fifth on the world all-time under-20 list. On 8 August, he completed the sprint double, winning the 200 metres final in 19.83 ahead of his American teammate Blake Hamilton with Barbadian Jayden Green in third place. On the final day of the championships he won the gold medal with the American men's 4 x 100 m relay team, along with teammates Blake Hamilton, Kyler Brown, and Dillon Mitchell, in a new world U20 record of 38.16 seconds, surpassing the previous best set by South Africa in winning the title in 2021.

== Achievements ==
- Information from World Athletics profile unless otherwise noted.

=== Personal bests ===
Distance	Time (s)	Wind	Location	Date	Notes
60 metres	6.64		Armory Track & Field Center, New York (USA)	16 March 2026	
100 metres	9.94	+0.1 m/s	Eugene, OR, U.S.	6 August 2026	
200 metres	19.75	-0.9 m/s	Eugene, OR, U.S.	4 July 2026	
200 meters (i)	20.46	-	Armory Track & Field Center, New York (USA)	16 March 2026	
300 meters (i)	32.45	-	Virginia Beach Sports Center, Virginia Beach (USA)	17 January 2026	

=== International competitions ===
Representing the United States
Year	Competition	Venue	Position	Event	Time	Notes
2026	World U20 Championships	Eugene, OR, United States	1st	100 m	9.94	PB
2026	World U20 Championships	Eugene, OR, United States	1st	200 m	19.83	CR
2026	World U20 Championships	Eugene, OR, United States	1st	4 × 100 m relay	38.16	WU20R

=== Circuit wins ===
- Diamond League

- 2026: Prefontaine Classic (200 m)
