= 2019 Estonian Athletics Championships =

- Edition: 102nd
- Dates: 17–18 August 2019
- Host city: Tallinn, Estonia
- Venue: Kadriorg Stadium
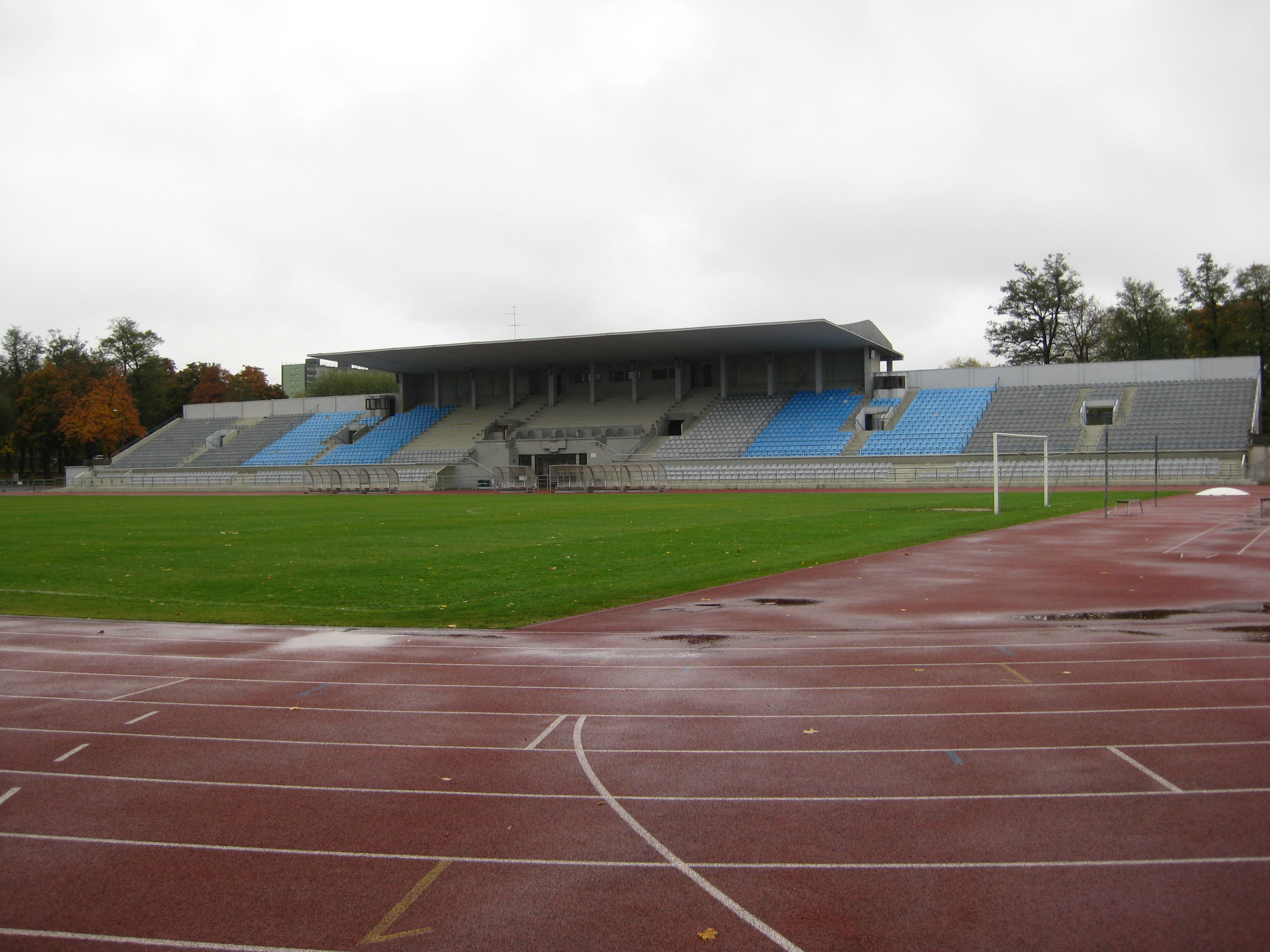
- Level: Senior
- Type: Outdoor

The 2019 Estonian Athletics Championships (Estonian: Eesti meistrivõistlused 2019) was the 102nd edition of the national championship in outdoor track and field for athletes in Estonia. It was held between 17–18 August at the Kadriorg Stadium in Tallinn.

The 10,000 metres races were held separately on 25 July and combined events championship on 26–27 July in Rakvere. Estonian championships in marathon were held in Tallinn Marathon.

== Results ==
=== Men ===
Event	Gold		Silver		Bronze	
100 metres	Karl Erik Nazarov; Audentese SK	10,69	Henri Sai; SK Altius	10,81	Ken-Mark Minkovski; Audentese SK	10,89
200 metres	Ken-Mark Minkovski; Audentese SK	21,55	Henri Sai; SK Altius	21,57	Kristen Pelolai; Tartu Ü. ASK	22,41
400 metres	Rivar Tipp; Tartu Ü. ASK	47,65	Lukas Lessel; SK Elite Sport	48,62	Sten Ander Sepp; Audentese SK	49,16
800 metres	Kaur Kivistik; Tartu SS Kalev	1.54,90	Karel-Sander Kljuzin; Tartu Ü. ASK	1.54,95	Sten Ütsmüts; Tartu Ü. ASK	1.55,16
1500 metres	Kaur Kivistik; Tallinna SS Kalev	4.00,39	Olavi Allase; Tartu SS Kalev	4.01,53	Tiidrek Nurme; Tartu Ü. ASK	4.01,62
5000 metres	Tiidrek Nurme; Tartu Ü. ASK	14.25,02	Olavi Allase; Tartu SS Kalev	14.59,39	Mark Abner; Treeningpartner	15.00,91
110 m hurdles	Johannes Treiel; KJK Saare	14,28	Hans-Christian Hausenberg; Tartu SS Kalev	14,57	Keiso Pedriks; Tallinna SS Kalev	14,66
400 m hurdles	Jaak-Heinrich Jagor; Tartu SS Kalev	50,66	Erik Jagor; Audentese SK	51,24	Karl Erik Nazarov; Audentese SK	51,48
3000 m steeplechase	Kaur Kivistik; Tartu SS Kalev	9.35,31	Ats Sõnajalg; Sparta Spordiselts	9.43,17	Dmitri Aristov; Treeningpartner	9.48,80
10 000m walk	Virgo Adusoo; B. Junk Käimisklubi	48.09,00	Jaroslav Stupnikov; KJK Kalev-Sillamäe	56.04,64	Igor Jakovlev; NPSK Narvic	58.17,02
High jump	Karl Lumi; Tallinna SS Kalev	2.16	Hendrik Lillemets; KJK Saare	2.13	Kevin Bsov; Audentese SK	2.00
Pole vault	Robin Nool; SK Elite Sport	5.25	Martin Paakspuu; KJK Lõunalõvi	4.40	Madis Kaare; SK Altius	4.20
Long jump	Hans-Christian Hausenberg; Tartu SS Kalev	7.77	Jaak Joonas Uudmäe; Audentese SK	7.39	Dmitri Mosendz; Tallinna SS Kalev	7.29
Triple jump	Jaak Joonas Uudmäe; Audentese SK	15.95	Dmitri Mosendz; Tallinna SS Kalev	15.60	Jaanus Suvi; KJK Järvala	14.44
Shot put	Kristo Galeta; KJS Sakala	19.96	Jander Heil; KJS Sakala	18.88	Kert Piirimäe; Koigi KJK	18.35
Discus throw	Gerd Kanter; Tallinna SS Kalev	58.60	Priidu Niit; Audentese SK	57.03	Kevin Sakson; Haapsalu KJK	51.71
Hammer throw	Adam Kelly; Tartu Ü. ASK	64.49	Mart Olman; Audentese SK	61.06	Toomas Tankler; Niidupargi KJK	58.68
Javelin throw	Magnus Kirt; Tallinna TÜ SK	87.57	Tanel Laanmäe; SK Viraaž	75.28	Erki Leppik; KJS Sakala	70.93

=== Women ===
Event	Gold		Silver		Bronze	
100 metres	Õilme Võro; KJK Lõunalõvi	11,86	Kristin Saua; KJK Lõunalõvi	12,25	Marje Nurk; KJK Lõunalõvi	12,28
200 metres	Õilme Võro; KJK Lõunalõvi	24,28	Kreete Verlin; SK Fortis	24,69	Kristin Saua; KJK Lõunalõvi	25,47
400 metres	Helin Meier; Nõmme KJK	55,02	Marielle Kleemeier; Tartu SS Kalev	55,12	Liis Roose; Tartu Ü. ASK	55,46
800 metres	Kelly Nevolihhin; KJK Vike	2.09,75	Helin Meier; Nõmme KJK	2.10,03	Katrina Stepanova; Sparta Spordiselts	2.14,77
1500 metres	Liina Tšernov; SK Jooksupartner	4.18,72	Kelly Nevolihhin; KJK Vike	4.24,13	Jekaterina Patjuk; Tartu Ü. ASK	4.34,28
5000 metres	Liina Tšernov; SK Jooksupartner	16.19,32	Jekaterina Patjuk; Tartu Ü. ASK	16.53,46	Kaisa KuKk; Treeningpartner	17.39,90
100 m hurdles	Diana Suumann; Tartu Ü. ASK	13,67	Kreete Verlin; SK Fortis	13,67	Katre Sofia Palm; Audentese SK	14,89
400 m hurdles	Liis Roose; Tartu Ü. ASK	59,65	Marielle Kleemeier; Tartu SS Kalev	1.00,85	Annika Sakkarias; Kurtide SL	1.02,61
3000 m steeplechase	Johanna Ardel; SK Beavers	11.15,73	Maria Veskla; Sparta Spordiselts	11.25,43	Merlyn Valma; Treeningpartner	11.47,62
10 000m walk	Jekaterina Mirotvortseva; KJK Kalev-Sillamäe	47.37,82	Anna Tipukina; KJK Atleetika	1.00.07,56	Lada Rosljakova; NPSK Narvic	1.02.10,51
High jump	Grete Udras; Tartu SS Kalev	1.76	Annika Teska; Tallinna SS Kalev	1.76		
High jump	Grete Udras; Tartu SS Kalev	1.76	Lilian Turban; SK Elite Sport	1.76		
Pole vault	Marleen Mülla; KJK Vike	4.05	Merilin Iital; SK Elite Sport	3.60	Marianne Kivi; Tartu Ü. ASK	3.50
High jump	Ksenija Balta; Tallinna SS Kalev	6.53	Aet Laurik; KJK TIPP	6.29	Merilyn Uudmäe; Audentese SK	6.26
Triple jump	Tähti Alver; Nõmme KJK	13.37	Merilyn Uudmäe; Audentese SK	13.33	Annabel Luuk; Tartu Ü. ASK	12.27
Shot put	Kätlin Piirimäe; Koigi KJK	14.87	Monica Vainola; Nõmme KJK	13.23	Laura Trašanov; SK Maret-Sport	13.05
Discus throw	Kätlin Tõllasson; Tartu Ü. ASK	56.62	Hanna-Maria Kupper; Tartu Ü. ASK	47.96	Kätlin Piirimäe; Koigi KJK	44.02
Hammer throw	Anna Maria Orel; Tallinna SS Kalev	67.03	Kati Ojaloo; KJS Sakala	66.38	Rael Kalda; Audentese SK	58.38
Javelin throw	Gedly Tugi; KJK Karksi	51.11	Gerli Israel; Tallinna SS Kalev	49.77	Marilis Remmel; KJK Saare	49.57
