= 2020 Estonian Athletics Championships =

- Edition: 103rd
- Dates: 8–9 August 2020
- Host city: Tallinn, Estonia
- Venue: Kadriorg Stadium
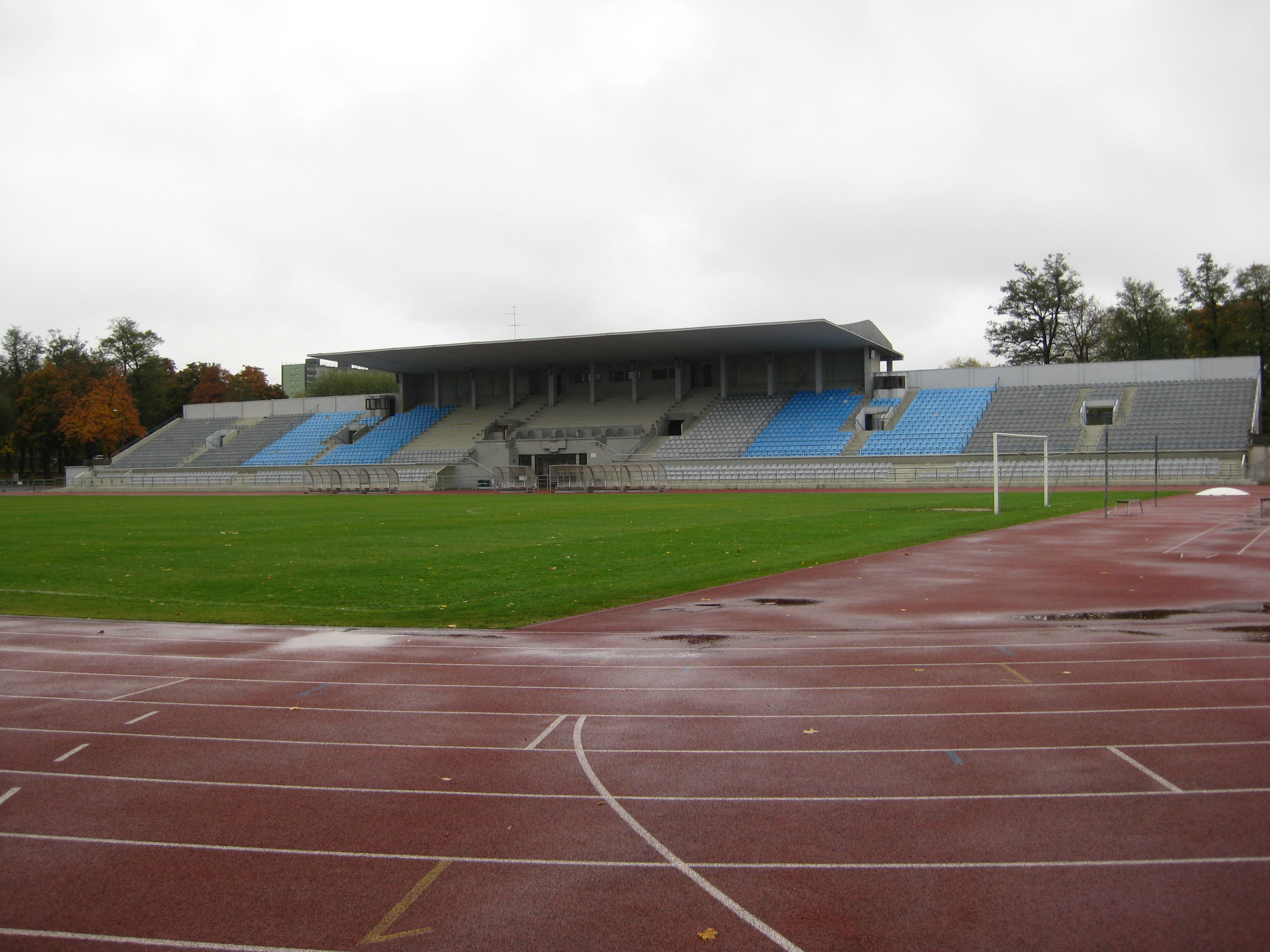
- Level: Senior
- Type: Outdoor

The 2020 Estonian Athletics Championships (Estonian: Eesti meistrivõistlused 2020) was the 103rd edition of the national championship in outdoor track and field for athletes in Estonia. It was held between 8–9 August at the Kadriorg Stadium in Tallinn. The 10,000 metres races were held separately on 19 July. The competition was scheduled for earlier in the year to serve as qualification for the 2020 European Athletics Championships, but was postponed due to the COVID-19 pandemic.

== Results ==
=== Men ===
Event	Gold		Silver		Bronze	
100 metres	Henri Sai	10.53 s	Ken-Mark Minkovski	10.66 s SB	Hans-Christian Hausenberg	10.73 s SB
200 metres	Henri Sai	21.08 s	Marek Niit	21.27 s SB	Ken-Mark Minkovski	21.56 s
400 metres	Rasmus Mägi	46.26 s	Sten Ander Sepp	48.33 s PB	Rivar Tipp	49.00 s SB
800 metres	Kaarel Sander Kljuzin	1:52.13 min PB	Rasmus Kisel	1:52.58 min	Enari Tõnström	1:52.95 min SB
1500 metres	Kaur Kivistik	3:54.56 min	Tiidrek Nurme	3:54.97 min SB	Olavi Allase	3:56.33 min SB
5000 metres	Tiidrek Nurme	14:36.84 min	Roman Fosti	14:46.39 min SB	Leonid Latsepov	14:56.33 min
10,000 metres	Kaur Kivistik	30:19.19 min	Leonid Latsepov	30:23.53 min PB	Dmitri Aristov	30:53.41 min PB
110 m hurdles	Keiso Pedriks	14.12 s	Johannes Treiel	14.18 s	Martin Täht	14.38 s PB
400 m hurdles	Jaak-Heinrich Jagor	50.76 s	Sten Ander Sepp	53.12 s PB	Karl-Oskar Pajus	54.73 s PB
3000 m s'chase	Kaur Kivistik	9:19.12 min	Taavi Kilki	9:20.72 min PB	Ats Sõnajalg	9:37.60 min
High jump	Kristjan Tafenau	2.10 m	Deniss Tšernobajev	2.05 m SB	Karl Lumi	2.05 m
Pole vault	Eerik Haamer	5.20 m	Hans-Christian Hausenberg	5.15 m PB	Tony Ats Tamm	4.60 m PB
Long jump	Hans-Christian Hausenberg	7.91 m	Rain Kaks	7.56 m SB	Henrik Kutberg	6.53 m SB
Triple jump	Jaak Joonas Uudmäe	16.36 m	Igor Sjunin	16.15 m SB	Dmitri Mosendz	15.04 m
Shot put	Jander Heil	19.70 m	Karl Koha	16.46 m	Priidu Niit	15.88 m SB
Discus throw	Martin Kupper	61.82 m	Gerd Kanter	58.62 m SB	Priidu Niit	57.93 m
Hammer throw	Adam Kelly	66.97 m	Toomas Tankler	62.14 m	Mart Olman	61.36 m SB
Javelin throw	Ranno Koorep	69.08 m SB	Tanel Laanmäe	68.53 m SB	Ergo Tamm	65.76 m
Decathlon	Risto Lillemets	8133 pts PB				

=== Women ===
Event	Gold		Silver		Bronze	
100 metres	Ksenija Balta	11.66 s	Õilme Võro	11.79 s	Ann Marii Kivikas	11.87 s PB
200 metres	Ann Marii Kivikas	23.96 s	Kristin Saua	24.49 s	Anna Maria Millend	24.77 s PB
400 metres	Marielle Kleemeier	54.97 s	Annika Sakkarias	55.98 s SB	Helin Meier	56.25 s SB
800 metres	Kelly Nevolihhin	2:11.54 min	Helin Meier	2:011.81 min SB	Katrin Zaitseva	2:12.59 min
1500 metres	Kelly Nevolihhin	4:34.72 min	Katrin Zaitseva	4:35.72 min	Jekaterina Patjuk	4:37.07 min
5000 metres	Jekaterina Patjuk	16:41.26 min	Liina Luik	17:05.23 min SB	Laura Maasik	17:16.99 min PB
10,000 metres	Jekaterina Patjuk	34:28.02 min	Laura Maasik	35:21.94 min PB	Liina Luik	35:35.87 min PB
100 m hurdles	Kreete Verlin	13.47 s	Diana Suumann	14.58 s	Anna Maria Millend	14.02 s
400 m hurdles	Marielle Kleemeier	59.90 s	Annika Sakkarias	59.94 s SB	Liis Roose	61.77 s SB
3000 m s'chase	Laura Maasik	10:24.71 min	Saina Mamedova	12:09.70 min	Merlyn Valma	12:21.40 min
High jump	Lilian Turban	1.79 m	Grete Udras	1.73 m SB	Leanne Siimumäe	1.73 m =PB
Pole vault	Marleen Mülla	3.75 m	Marianne Kivi	3.70 m	Laure Kiivit	3.50 m
Long jump	Tähti Alver	6.54 m	Ksenija Balta	6.53 m SB	Kreete Verlin	6.40 m PB
Triple jump	Merilyn Uudmäe	13.32 m	Johanna Soover	12.57 m	Eliise Anijalg	12.37 m SB
Shot put	Valeria Radajeva	13.93 m	Monica Vainola	13.66 m SB	Gertu Küttmann	13.48 m PB
Discus throw	Kätlin Tõllasson	53.37 m SB	Hanna-Maria Kupper	51.47 m	Kelly Heinpõld	42.58 m
Hammer throw	Anna Maria Orel	63.29 m	Annika Emily Kelly	53.54 m	Rael Kalda	47.21 m
Javelin throw	Gerli Israel	55.81 m	Mirell Luik	53.84 m SB	Gedly Tugi	52.26 m SB
Heptathlon	Mari Klaup-McColl	6080 pts	Pippi Lotta Enok	5220 pts PB		
