= Lasnamäe Indoor Arena =

Sports venue in Tallinn

- Lasnamäe Kergejõustikuhall
- Interactive map of Lasnamäe Indoor Arena
- Address: Punane tn 45
- Location: Lasnamäe, Tallinn, Estonia
- Coordinates: 59°26′08″N 24°50′21″E

Construction
- Built: 2003
- Renovated: 2014

Website
- tsh.ee

Lasnamäe Indoor Arena is a multipurpose indoor arena at Lasnamäe, Tallinn, Estonia. It was built in 2003 and is one of the biggest indoor arenas in Estonia.

It hosts annually the athletics event Tallinn Indoor Meeting and Estonian Indoor Athletics Championships.

== Athletics records ==
=== World records ===
Year	Event	Record	Athlete	Nationality
2011	Heptathlon	6568	Ashton Eaton	United States

=== Stadium records ===
Updated 23 February 2025.

==== Men ====
Event	Record	Athlete	Nationality	Date	Ref
60 m	6.63	Karl Erik Nazarov	Estonia	13.02.2021	
200 m	21.09	Marek Niit	Estonia	23.01.2007	
300 m	33.40 (NR)	Lukas Lessel	Estonia	30.01.2022	
400 m	47.32	Tony Nõu	Estonia	17.02.2018	
600 m	1:21.88	Kristjan Kangur	Estonia	16.02.2010	
800 m	1:48.10	Uku Renek Kronbergs	Estonia	01.03.2026	
1000 m	2:29.40	Jānis Razgalis	Latvia	11.02.2016	
1500 m	3:43.29	James Kangogo Kelwon	Kenya	19.02.2011	
2000 m	5:30.15	Taivo Püi	Estonia	16.02.2010	
3000 m	8:06.66	Deniss Šalkauskas	Estonia	01.03.2026	
60 m hurdles	7.60	Ashton Eaton	United States	06.02.2011	
High jump	2.31 m	Naoto Tobe	Japan	23.02.2020	
Pole vault	5.65 m	Ernest John Obiena	Philippines	22.02.2025	
Long jump	7.92 m	Hans-Christian Hausenberg	Estonia	05.02.2022	
Triple jump	16.65 m	Yuri Kovalev	Russia	24.01.2012	
Shot put	19.91 m	Māris Urtāns	Latvia	20.01.2010	
Heptathlon	6568 pts (WR)	Ashton Eaton	United States	06.02.2011	
5000 m walk	21:36.73	Lauri Lelumees	Estonia	13.02.2011	
4 × 200 m relay	1:25.52	Estonian team	Estonia	19.02.2005	

==== Women ====
Event	Record	Athlete	Nationality	Date	Ref
60 m	7.28 (NR)	Õilme Võro	Estonia	17.02.2024	
200 m	23.65	Patricia Hall	Jamaica	24.01.2012	
300 m	37.46 (NR)	Marielle Kleemeier	Estonia	30.01.2022	
400 m	53.33	Marielle Kleemeier	Estonia	26.02.2022	
600 m	1:36.82	Kersti Miller	Estonia	05.01.2008	
800 m	2:03.02	Līga Velvere	Latvia	18.02.2018	
1500 m	4:23.02	Maile Mangusson	Estonia	14.02.2004	
3000 m	9:31.14	Jekaterina Patjuk	Estonia	13.02.2011	
60 m hurdles	7.99	Kreete Verlin	Estonia	01.03.2026	
High jump	1.93 m	Anna Iljuštšenko	Estonia	04.02.2009	
Pole vault	4.30 m	Reena Koll	Estonia	31.01.2016	
Long jump	6.73 m	Ksenija Balta	Estonia	19.02.2011	
Triple jump	14.20 m	Kaire Leibak	Estonia	04.02.2009	
Shot put	16.77 m	Kätlin Piirimäe	Estonia	27.02.2016	
Pentathlon	4549 pts	Aleksandra Putvina	Russia	08.02.2014	
3000 m walk	13:08.03 (NR)	Jekaterina Mirotvortseva	Estonia	22.02.2025	
