= List of Estonian records in athletics =

The following are the national records in athletics in Estonia maintained by Estonia's national athletics federation: Eesti Kergejõustikuliit (EKJL).

== Outdoor ==
Key to tables: Awaiting ratification Record not kept by EKJL Not ratified or later rescinded by EKJL

=== Men ===
Event	Record	Athlete	Date	Meet	Place	Ref.	Video
100 m	10.18 (+1.4 m/s)	Karl Erik Nazarov	16 June 2023	Heino Lipp Memorial	Jõhvi, Estonia		
200 m	20.43 (+1.1 m/s)	Marek Niit	9 June 2011	NCAA Division I Championships	Des Moines, United States		
300 m	32.24	Marek Niit	7 September 2014	Rieti Meeting	Rieti, Italy		
400 m	45.35	Rasmus Mägi	25 June 2022	Estonian Championships	Tallinn, Estonia		
600 m	1:16.02	Uku Renek Kronbergs	17 July 2024	KEVEK ja Tartu Kalevi staadionijooksu etapp	Tartu, Estonia		
800 m	1:45.72	Uku Renek Kronbergs	16 June 2026	Heino Lipp Memorial	Jõhvi, Estonia		
1000 m	2:20.45	Uku Renek Kronbergs	13 August 2025	KEVEK ja Tartu Kalevi staadionijooksu etapp	Tartu, Estonia		
1500 m	3:38.59	Tiidrek Nurme	15 August 2008	Olympic Games	Beijing, China		
Mile	3:59.74	Tiidrek Nurme	9 August 2011	BIGBANK Kuldliiga	Viljandi, Estonia		
Mile (road)	4:09.10	Deniss Šalkauskas	24 April 2026		Marinha Grande, Portugal		
Mile (road)	3:59.77	Rasmus Kisel	19 September 2026	World Road Running Championships	Copenhagen, Denmark		
2000 m	5:04.59	Deniss Šalkauskas	16 June 2026	Heino Lipp Memorial	Jõhvi, Estonia		
3000 m	7:48.24	Tiidrek Nurme	11 July 2014	Morton Games	Dublin, Ireland		
5000 m	13:17.2 h	Enn Sellik	28 June 1976		Podolsk, Soviet Union		
5 km (road)	14:06	Tiidrek Nurme	1 October 2023	World Road Running Championships	Riga, Latvia		
10,000 m	27:40.61	Enn Sellik	29 August 1978	European Championships	Prague, Czechoslovakia		
10 km (road)	29:04	Tiidrek Nurme	19 September 2020	Selveri Suurjooks (Estonian 10 km Championships)	Rapla, Estonia		
10 km (road)	29:03	Tiidrek Nurme	6 May 2023	42. Kuressaare linnajooks	Kuressaare, Estonia		
10 km (road)	28:58	Toomas Turb	18 September 1983		Tallinn, Soviet Union		
15 km (road)	44:30+	Tiidrek Nurme	17 October 2020	World Half Marathon Championships	Gdynia, Poland		
One hour	19887 m +	Lembit Virkus	14 September 1960		Tartu, Soviet Union		
20 km (road)	59:25+	Tiidrek Nurme	17 October 2020	World Half Marathon Championships	Gdynia, Poland		
Half marathon	1:02:20	Tiidrek Nurme	17 October 2020	World Half Marathon Championships	Gdynia, Poland		
30 km (road)	1:36:26	Ants Nurmekivi	20 July 1970		Karksi-Nuia, Soviet Union		
Marathon	2:08:53	Pavel Loskutov	7 April 2002	Paris Marathon	Paris, France		
110 m hurdles	13.62 (±0.0 m/s)	Tarmo Jallai	13 May 2006	Xalapa Gala Banamex Veracruz	Xalapa, Mexico		
200 m hurdles	23.0 h	Kalju Jurkatamm	28 August 1968		Riga, Soviet Union		
300 m hurdles	37.31	Taavi Tšernjavski	13 August 2025	KEVEK ja Tartu Kalevi staadionijooksu etapp	Tartu, Estonia		
400 m hurdles	47.82	Rasmus Mägi	14 June 2022	Paavo Nurmi Games	Turku, Finland		
2000 m steeplechase	5:44.91	Rainer Nõlvak	15 July 1985		Krasnodar, Soviet Union		
3000 m steeplechase	8:28.55	Kaur Kivistik	3 September 2019	IWC Zagreb	Zagreb, Croatia		
High jump	2.30 m	Marko Turban	5 June 1996		Rakvere, Estonia		
Pole vault	5.86 m	Valeri Bukrejev	3 July 1994		Somero, Finland		
Long jump	8.10 m (+0.3 m/s)	Erki Nool	27 May 1995	Hypo-Meeting	Götzis, Austria		
Triple jump	17.35 m (−0.3 m/s)	Jaak Uudmäe	25 July 1980	Olympic Games	Moscow, Soviet Union		
Shot put	20.76 m	Kristo Galeta	21 July 2019	Eesti karikavõistlused	Pärnu, Estonia		
Discus throw	73.38 m	Gerd Kanter	4 September 2006		Helsingborg, Sweden		
Hammer throw	84.40 m	Jüri Tamm	9 September 1984		Banská Bystrica, Czechoslovakia		
Javelin throw	90.61 m	Magnus Kirt	22 June 2019	Kuortane Games	Kuortane, Finland		
Decathlon	8815 pts	Erki Nool	6–7 August 2001	World Championships	Edmonton, Canada		
Decathlon	100m (wind) / Long jump (wind) / Shot put / High jump / 400m / 110m H (wind) / Discus / Pole vault / Javelin / 1500m; 10.60 (+1.5 m/s) / 7.63 m (+2.0 m/s) / 14.90 m / 2.03 m / 46.23 / 14.40 (±0.0 m/s) / 43.40 m / 5.40 m / 67.01 m / 4:29.58						
5000 m walk (track)	20:04.6 h	Vassili Matvejev	16 May 1981		Kohtla-Järve, Soviet Union		
10,000 m walk (track)	42:28.2 h	Olav Laiv	26 May 1974		Tallinn, Soviet Union		
10 km walk (road)	40:30	Vassili Matvejev	25 February 1984		Alushta, Soviet Union		
20,000 m walk (track)	1:27:21.0	Vassili Matvejev	7 September 1985		Tallinn, Soviet Union		
20 km walk (road)	1:23:00.5	Vassili Matvejev	13 October 1985		Alushta, Soviet Union		
30 km walk (road)	2:19:24	Arvo Orupõld	28 June 1980		Mõdriku, Soviet Union		
50 km walk (road)	4:07:09.8	Olav Laiv	14 June 1975		Kohtla-Nõmme, Soviet Union		
4 × 100 m relay	39.52	Estonia; Mart Muru; Rait Veesalu; Markus Ellisaar; Marek Niit	16 August 2014	European Championships	Zürich, Switzerland		
4 × 200 m relay	1:25.3 h	Estonian SSR; Gennadi Organov; Mihhail Urjadnikov; Gunnar Kirsipuu; Ramon Lindal	30 May 1981		Riga, Soviet Union		
Swedish relay	1:52.84	Tartu SS Kalev; Hans-Christian Hausenberg; Andreas Mutli; Henri Loose; Uku Renek Kronbergs	24 May 2026	Estonian Relay Championships	Tartu, Estonia		
4 × 400 m relay	3:06.07	Estonia; Rauno Künnapuu; Marek Niit; Rivar Tipp; Rasmus Mägi	21 June 2015	European Team Championships	Heraklion, Greece		
4 × 800 m relay	7:26.0 h	Estonian SSR; Mihkel Konsa; Ivar Hanvere; Andres Vakra; Gennadi Bezrodnov	2 June 1979		Vilnius, Soviet Union		
4 × 1500 m relay	15:38.4 h	EPA; Raivo Võlli; Raivo Puurits; Vello Misler; Enn Sellik	7 June 1981		Tallinn, Soviet Union		
Ekiden relay	2:09:59	Tartu Ülikooli ASK; Deniss Košelev; Tiidrek Nurme; Alexey Markov; Nikolai Vedehin; Kenny Kivikas; Allar Lamp	28 September 2013	Estonian Championships	Tallinn, Estonia		

=== Women ===
Event	Record	Athlete	Date	Meet	Place	Ref.	Video
100 m	11.35 (+1.3 m/s)	Ksenija Balta	15 June 2014	Gustav Sule Memorial	Tartu, Estonia		
100 m	11.35 (+0.3 m/s)	Ann Marii Kivikas	2 August 2025	Estonian Championships	Tallinn, Estonia		
100 m	11.35 (±0.0 m/s)	Ann Marii Kivikas	10 August 2026	European Championships	Birmingham, United Kingdom		
100 m	11.33 (+2.1 m/s)	Õilme Võro	26 August 2024	Toivo Pruul Memorial	Kärdla, Estonia		
200 m	23.04 (+1.2 m/s)	Ann Marii Kivikas	23 July 2025	Motonet GP	Tampere, Finland		
300 m	37.78	Marielle Kleemeier	3 July 2022	Pärnu Rannastaadioni Kergejõustikuõhtu	Pärnu, Estonia		
400 m	51.91	Egle Uljas	21 August 2004	Olympic Games	Athens, Greece		
600 m	1:30.65	Marielle Kleemeier	18 June 2024	Reunión Internacional Villa de Bilbao	Bilbao, Spain		
800 m	2:02.1 h	Raissa Ruus	20 July 1972		Moscow, Soviet Union		
1000 m	2:41.31	Liina Tšernov	17 August 2017	Sopot Grand Prix	Sopot, Poland		
1500 m	4:11.44	Liina Tšernov	19 June 2016	Brussels Grand Prix	Brussels, Belgium		
Mile	4:36.36	Liina Tšernov	18 August 2017	Nõmme seeriajooks	Tallinn, Estonia		
Mile (road)	4:47.15	Laura Maasik	5 June 2026	Narva City Run	Narva, Estonia		
2000 m	5:56.8 h	Sirje Eichelmann	7 September 1988		Tallinn, Soviet Union		
3000 m	8:55.75	Ille Kukk	8 September 1984		Donetsk, Soviet Union		
5000 m	15:30.84	Ille Kukk	1 August 1985		Leningrad, Soviet Union		
5 km (road)	16:49	Helen Bell	11 May 2024	Helsinki City Running Day	Helsinki, Finland		
5 km (road)	16:30.8	Tuuli Tomingas	26 September 2024	Vienna Night Run	Vienna, Austria		
10,000 m	32:47.86	Sirje Eichelmann	2 August 1988		Kyiv, Soviet Union		
10 km (road)	32:44	Jane Salumäe	21 May 1995	Springtime	Helsingborg, Sweden		
15 km (road)	50:00	Jane Salumäe	20 May 1995	Götajoggen	Karlstad, Sweden		
One hour	15177 m	Kaia Lepik	23 August 2017	Pikamaajooksusari VIII etapp	Kohila, Estonia		
20 km (road)	1:11:48	Jane Salumäe	26 May 2002	Valencia 20 km	Valencia, Spain		
Half marathon	1:10:10	Jane Salumäe	27 March 1994	City-Pier-City Loop	The Hague, Netherlands		
Marathon	2:27:04	Jane Salumäe	11 May 1997	Torino Marathon	Turin, Italy		
100 m hurdles	12.93 (+0.9 m/s)	Mirjam Liimask	17 July 2005	European U23 Championships	Erfurt, Germany		
200 m hurdles	27.5 h	Saima Tiik	15 September 1974		Vilnius, Soviet Union		
300 m hurdles	41.65	Mia Lisett Meringo	19 May 2026	Pärnu Spordikooli sprindiõhtu	Pärnu, Estonia		
400 m hurdles	56.00	Viola Hambidge	18 July 2026	Lappeenranta Games	Lappeenranta, Finland		
2000 m steeplechase	6:17.07	Laura Maasik	1 September 2024 (Note: by official result source; 2 September by EKJL source, a typo)	ISTAF Berlin	Berlin, Germany		
3000 m steeplechase	9:44.20	Laura Maasik	7 June 2024	European Championships	Rome, Italy		
High jump	1.96 m	Anna Iljuštšenko	9 August 2011	BIGBANK Kuldliiga	Viljandi, Estonia		
High jump	1.96 m =WU18B	Karmen Bruus	19 July 2022	World Championships	Eugene, United States		
Pole vault	4.57 m (Note: Outdoor best; indoor mark ratified as absolute record.)	Marleen Mülla	15 May 2025	Summit League Championships	Vermillion, United States		
Long jump	6.87 m (+0.1 m/s) (Note: by World Athletics source; -0.1 m/s by EKJL source)	Ksenija Balta	8 August 2010	ERGO World Games	Tallinn, Estonia		
Triple jump	14.43 m (+0.6 m/s)	Kaire Leibak	17 August 2006	World Junior Championships	Beijing, China		
Shot put	18.03 m	Veronika Minina	25 May 1980		Nokia, Finland		
Discus throw	65.00 m	Elju Kubi	26 August 1987		Tallinn, Soviet Union		
Discus throw	66.42 m (Note: citizenship status not confirmed)	Anne Salak-Horina	1986	Heitjate seeriavõistlus	Tallinn, Soviet Union		
Hammer throw	71.50 m	Kati Ojaloo	29 August 2020		Pori, Finland		
Javelin throw	63.65 m	Liina Laasma	22 May 2016	Meeting International Mohammed VI d'Athlétisme de Rabat	Rabat, Morocco		
Heptathlon	6285 pts	Pippi Lotta Enok	13–14 June 2025	NCAA Championships	Eugene, United States		
Heptathlon	100m H (wind) / High jump / Shot put / 200m (wind) / Long jump (wind) / Javelin / 800m; 13.65 (+0.5 m/s) / 1.81 m / 12.50 m / 24.09 (+1.0 m/s) / 6.39 m (+1.2 m/s) / 42.89 m / 2:14.12						
Decathlon	6732 pts	Kristella Jurkatamm	14–15 July 2018	Naiste kümnevõistlus Multiprojekti auhindadele	Kohila, Estonia		
Decathlon	100m (wind) / Discus / Pole vault / Javelin / 400m / 100m H (wind) / Long jump (wind) / Shot put / High jump / 1500m; 12.91 (−1.6 m/s) / 31.87 m / 2.64 m / 41.87 m / 58.90 / 14.67 (−1.7 m/s) / 5.65 m (+2.9 m/s) / 11.29 m / 1.62 m / 5:45.10						
5000 m walk (track)	21:43.45	Jekaterina Mirotvortseva	30 July 2022	Baltic Team Championships	Valmiera, Latvia		
5 km walk (road)	23:51	Jekaterina Mirotvortseva	27 April 2019	Baltic Team U20 Race Walking Championships	Birštonas, Lithuania		
10,000 m walk (track)	45:51.85	Jekaterina Mirotvortseva	3 August 2025	Estonian Championships	Tallinn, Estonia		
10 km walk (road)	45:28	Jekaterina Mirotvortseva	22 March 2025	Dudinská Päťdesiatka	Dudince, Slovakia		
20 km walk (road)	1:31:52	Jekaterina Mirotvortseva	18 May 2025	European Race Walking Team Championships	Poděbrady, Czech Republic		
4 × 100 m relay	43.98	Estonia; Mia Ott; Anna Maria Millend; Kreete Verlin; Ann Marii Kivikas	28 June 2025	European Team Championships	Maribor, Slovenia		
4 × 200 m relay	1:38.5 h	Estonian SSR; Silva Oja; Taimi Loov; Kaie Kivi; Aili Alliksoo	29 July 1979		Moscow, Soviet Union		
Swedish relay	2:09.06	Estonia U18; Pia Lauren Matsalu; Miia Ott; Mia Mireia Uusorg; Viola Hambidge	29 July 2023	European Youth Olympic Festival	Maribor, Slovenia		
4 × 400 m relay	3:36.82	Estonia; Jekaterina Duman; Kristi Kiirats; Egle Uljas; Maris Mägi	24 June 2007	European Cup	Odense, Denmark		
3 × 800 m relay	6:30.48	Tallinna SS Kalev; Jevgenia Mateitšuk; Veera Duman; Maria Sahharova	23 June 2006		Rakvere, Estonia		
4 × 800 m relay	8:46.5 h	Estonian SSR; Lea Griffel; Maie Kalle; Ille Kukk; Tatjana Filippova	18 September 1978		Tbilisi, Soviet Union		
Ekiden relay	2:30:46	Tartu Ülikooli ASK; Keiti Mets; Jekaterina Patjuk; Egle Mätas; Liina Luik; Leila Luik; Lily Luik	28 September 2013	Estonian Championships	Tallinn, Estonia		

=== Mixed ===
Event	Record	Team	Date	Meet	Place	Ref.
4 × 100 m relay	43.21	Estonia; Andreas Varter; Liisa-Maria Lusti; Rain Kirsipuu; Terje Meister	1 August 2026	Baltic Team Championships	Riga, Latvia	
4 × 400 m relay	3:19.47	Estonia; Lukas Lessel; Viola Hambidge; Rasmus Mägi; Marielle Kleemeier	22 June 2023	European Team Championships	Chorzów, Poland	
Ekiden relay	2:24:44	Sparta SS; Ats Sõnajalg; Olga Andrejeva; Katrina Stepanova; Roman Fosti; Brit Rammul; Roman Hvalõnski	20 April 2019	Estonian Ekiden Championships	Tallinn, Estonia	

== Indoor ==
=== Men ===
Event	Record	Athlete	Date	Meet	Place	Ref.	Video
50 m	5.82	Argo Golberg	5 March 2003	Jumping Gala	Tallinn, Estonia		
60 m	6.55	Karl Erik Nazarov	19 March 2022	World Championships	Belgrade, Serbia		
60 m	6.4 h	Enn Lilienthal	21 February 1988		Moscow, Soviet Union		
100 m	10.63	Gennadi Organov	12 February 1979		Minsk, Soviet Union		
100 m	10.3 h	Gennadi Organov	15 February 1978		Ryazan, Soviet Union		
200 m	20.63	Marek Niit	15 February 2014	Tyson Invitational	Fayetteville, United States		
300 m	33.40	Lukas Lessel	30 January 2022	Eesti talvised karikavõistlused	Tallinn, Estonia		
400 m	45.99	Marek Niit	26 February 2011	SEC Championships	Fayetteville, United States		
600 m	1:16.76	Uku Renek Kronbergs	13 February 2026	Martin Kutman Memorial	Tartu, Estonia		
800 m	1:46.71	Uku Renek Kronbergs	20 March 2026	World Championships	Toruń, Poland		
1000 m	2:21.87	Marko Metsala	17 February 2000	GE Galan	Stockholm, Sweden		
1500 m	3:43.64	Deniss Šalkauskas	13 February 2026	Erfurt Indoor	Erfurt, Germany		
Mile	4:02.42	Andi Noot	28 December 2016	TÜ ASK aastalõpu teivashüppevõistlus	Tartu, Estonia		
2000 m	5:07.22	Andi Noot	17 December 2016	Olümpiavõitja Jaak Uudmäe auhinnavõistlused	Tartu, Estonia		
3000 m	7:55.37	Tiidrek Nurme	10 February 2010	GE Galan	Stockholm, Sweden		
5000 m	13:54.2	Enn Sellik	19 February 1975		Leningrad, Soviet Union		
Marathon	2:39:03	Ahti Nuga	28 January 2023	9. Tondiraba sisemaraton	Tallinn, Estonia		
50 m hurdles	6.73	Rene Oruman	28 February 2008	Kuressaare Gala	Kuressaare, Estonia		
55 m hurdles	7.28	Tarmo Jallai	21 January 2005	Lubbock Wes Kittley All-Comers	Lubbock, United States		
60 m hurdles	7.66	Keiso Pedriks	26 December 2021	Karel Leetsari mälestusvõistlus	Pärnu, Estonia		
110 m hurdles	14.18	Tarmo Jallai	12 February 2001		Tampere, Finland		
300 m hurdles	38.09 OT	Johann-Martin Torim	21 January 2026	Tampere Meeting	Tampere, Finland		
2000 m steeplechase	5:25.45	Mati Uusmaa	2 February 1986		Moscow, Soviet Union		
High jump	2.27 m	Marko Aleksejev	15 February 2004	Estonian Championships	Tallinn, Estonia		
Pole vault	5.65 m	Valeri Bukrejev	5 March 1995		Kuopio, Finland		
Pole vault	5.65 m	Valeri Bukrejev	10 March 1995	World Championships	Barcelona, Spain		
Long jump	8.05 m	Tõnu Lepik	15 March 1970	European Championships	Vienna, Austria		
Triple jump	17.10 m	Jaak Uudmäe	12 February 1979		Minsk, Soviet Union		
Shot put	19.87 m	Heino Sild	22 February 1979		Voroshilovgrad, Soviet Union		
Discus throw	69.51 m WB	Gerd Kanter	22 March 2009	World Record Indoor Challenge	Växjö, Sweden		
Heptathlon	6437 pts	Johannes Erm	22–23 March 2025	World Championships	Nanjing, China		
Heptathlon	60m / Long jump / Shot put / High jump / 60m H / Pole vault / 1000m; 6.94 / 7.77 m / 15.27 m / 1.98 m / 7.91 / 5.30 m / 2:34.91						
5000 m walk	20:17.4	Vassili Matvejev	7 February 1982		Moscow, Soviet Union		
10,000 m walk	41:50.4	Vassili Matvejev	2 March 1982		Minsk, Soviet Union		
4 × 200 m relay	1:25.52	Estonia; Marek Niit; Henri Sool; Ahti Michelson; Martin Vihmann	19 February 2005	Baltic match	Tallinn, Estonia		
4 × 400 m relay	3:14.81	Audentese SK; Sten Ander Sepp; Karl Erik Nazarov; Erik Jagor; Tony Nõu	18 February 2018	Estonian Championships	Tallinn, Estonia		

=== Women ===
Event	Record	Athlete	Date	Meet	Place	Ref.	Video
50 m	6.35	Ksenija Balta	28 February 2008	Kuressaare Gala	Kuressaare, Estonia		
60 m	7.24	Õilme Võro	2 March 2024	World Championships	Glasgow, United Kingdom		
100 m	11.82	Katrin Käärt	4 February 2002	Tampere Stars Games	Tampere, Finland		
150 m	17.75	Ann Marii Kivikas	2 January 2025	Pole Vault GP	Tallinn, Estonia		
200 m	23.61	Katrin Käärt	1 March 2002	European Championships	Vienna, Austria		
300 m	37.46	Marielle Kleemeier	30 January 2022	Eesti talvised karikavõistlused	Tallinn, Estonia		
400 m	52.98	Maris Mägi	23 January 2010	Vienna Indoor Gala	Vienna, Austria		
600 m	1:28.42	Egle Uljas	17 February 2006	Lincoln Prairie Wolf Invitational	Lincoln, United States		
800 m	2:04.39	Egle Uljas	20 February 2007	BIG Kuldliiga	Võru, Estonia		
1000 m	2:44.51	Egle Uljas	2 February 2007	Tallinn Championships	Tallinn, Estonia		
1500 m	4:19.12	Maile Mangusson	15 February 2001	GE Galan	Stockholm, Sweden		
Mile	4:48.55	Anete Randma	26 February 2026	Southland Conference Championships	Birmingham, United States		
2000 m	6:02.4	Ille Kukk	11 February 1983		Tallinn, Soviet Union		
3000 m	9:07.1	Ille Kukk	3 February 1985		Moscow, Soviet Union		
5000 m	16:45.10	Jekaterina Patjuk	1 September 2020	5000m jooksu ajavõistlus	Tartu, Estonia		
50 m hurdles	7.09	Mirjam Liimask	20 February 2008	BIG Kuldliiga	Tartu, Estonia		
55 m hurdles	7.72	Anu Kaljurand	29 February 1992		Colorado Springs, United States		
60 m hurdles	7.96	Kreete Verlin	6 February 2026	Villa de Madrid Indoor Meeting	Madrid, Spain		
100 m hurdles	13.78	Kertu Tiitso	10 February 1997		Tampere, Finland		
High jump	1.94 m	Anna Iljuštšenko	2 February 2013	Hochsprung mit Musik	Arnstadt, Germany		
Pole vault	4.63 m	Marleen Mülla	20 February 2026	Nebraska Tune Up	Lincoln, United States		
Long jump	6.87 m	Ksenija Balta	7 March 2009	European Championships	Turin, Italy		
Triple jump	14.26 m	Kaire Leibak	9 February 2008	Estonian Championships	Tartu, Estonia		
Shot put	17.66 m	Rimma Plistkina	9 February 1975		Tallinn, Soviet Union		
Discus throw	44.96 m	Kätlin Tõllasson	10 March 2012	World Indoor Throwing	Växjö, Sweden		
Pentathlon	4593 pts	Pippi Lotta Enok	27 February 2025	SEC Championships	College Station, United States		
Pentathlon	60m H / High jump / Shot put / Long jump / 800m; 8.46 / 1.81 m / 12.64 m / 6.40 m / 2:14.72						
3000 m walk	13:08.03	Jekaterina Mirotvortseva	22 February 2025	Estonian Championships	Tallinn, Estonia		
5000 m walk	23:30.66	Jekaterina Mirotvortseva	25 February 2020	International Indoor Athletic Match U20	Minsk, Belarus		
4 × 200 m relay	1:39.39	Estonia; Liis Laanesaar; Hege Mardiste; Kadri Kuub; Maris Mägi	19 February 2005	Baltic match	Tallinn, Estonia		
4 × 400 m relay	3:48.75	Tartu Ülikooli ASK; Liis Roose; Karmen Veerme; Grit Šadeiko; Maris Mägi	22 February 2015	Estonian Championships	Tallinn, Estonia		

=== Mixed ===
Event	Record	Team	Date	Meet	Place	Ref.
4 × 400 m relay	3:30.57	Tartu SS Kalev; Marielle Kleemeier; Anette Pets; Karl Robert Saluri; Uku-Renek Kronbergs	27 February 2022	Estonian Championships	Tallinn, Estonia	

== See also ==
- List of Baltic records in athletics
