= Estonian Athletics Championships =

National championship in athletics

Estonian Championships in Athletics (Estonian: Eesti meistrivõistlused kergejõustikus) is the national championship in athletics, organized by the Estonian Athletic Association. The first competition was held in 1917.

Championships in long distances (10 000 m, half marathon and marathon) are held on different dates.

== Championships records ==
=== Men ===
Event	Record	Athlete	Date	Place	Ref.
100 m	10.28	Marek Niit	18 August 2012	Tallinn	
200 m	20.73	Marek Niit	2 August 2009	Tallinn	
400 m	45.35 NR	Rasmus Mägi	25 June 2022	Tallinn	
800 m	1:48.16 NU20R	Uku Renek Kronbergs	30 July 2023	Tallinn	
1500 m	3:44.16	Tiidrek Nurme	18 August 2012	Tallinn	
5000 m	13:56.2 h	Toomas Turb	28 August 1984	Tartu	
10,000 m	28:49.0 h	Toomas Turb	17 August 1980	Tallinn	
Half marathon	1:03.23	Pavel Loskutov	3 September 2000	Tallinn	
Marathon	2:18.50	Leonid Latsepov	11 September 2022	Tallinn	
110 m hurdles	13.89	Andres Raja	1 August 2009	Tallinn	
400 m hurdles	48.04	Rasmus Mägi	30 July 2023	Tallinn	
3000 m steeplechase	8:30.96	Aivar Tsarski	21 July 1990	Tartu	
High jump	2.24 m	Marko Aleksejev	2 August 2004	Tallinn	
Pole vault	5.65 m	Valeri Bukrejev	3 July 1992	Pärnu	
Long jump	7.91 m	Hans-Christian Hausenberg	9 August 2020	Tallinn	
Triple jump	16.65 m	Ilja Tumorin	7 July 2001	Haapsalu	
Shot put	19.96 m	Kristo Galeta	17 August 2019	Tallinn	
Discus throw	69.58 m	Gerd Kanter	22 July 2006	Tallinn	
Hammer throw	76.78 m	Jüri Tamm	17 July 1994	Tallinn	
Javelin throw	88.28 m	Magnus Kirt	28 July 2018	Tallinn	
Decathlon	8299 pts	Kristjan Rosenberg	27 June 2021	Tallinn	

=== Women ===
Event	Record	Athlete	Date	Place	Ref.
100 m	11.35 (+0.3 m/s) =NR	Ann Marii Kivikas	2 August 2025	Tallinn	
200 m	23.55 (+1.4 m/s)	Ann Marii Kivikas	30 July 2023	Tallinn	
400 m	52.68	Maris Mägi	18 July 2010	Tallinn	
800 m	2:06.1 h	Katrin Rehemaa	15 August 1982	Tallinn	
800 m	2:06.16	Liina Tšernov	23 July 2017	Tallinn	
1500 m	4:15.95	Liina Tšernov	22 July 2017	Tallinn	
5000 m	16:13.73	Jekaterina Patjuk	9 August 2015	Tallinn	
10,000 m	35:11.44	Lily Luik	14 July 2017	Tallinn	
Half marathon	1:14.24	Külli Kaljus	2 September 2001	Tallinn	
Marathon	2:45.02	Evelin Talts	9 September 2012	Tallinn	
100 m hurdles	13.07 (+0.7 m/s)	Diana Suumann	29 July 2023	Tallinn	
400 m hurdles	56.56	Maris Mägi	28 July 2013	Tallinn	
3000 m steeplechase	10:01.81	Laura Maasik	29 July 2023	Tallinn	
High jump	1.95 m	Anna Iljuštšenko	31 July 2011	Tallinn	
Pole vault	4.30 m	Reena Koll	29 July 2018	Tallinn	
Long jump	6.80 m	Ksenija Balta	17 July 2010	Tallinn	
Triple jump	14.05 m	Tähti Alver	28 July 2018	Tallinn	
Shot put	17.06 m	Helgi Parts	1 July 1979	Tallinn	
Discus throw	63.36 m	Elju Kubi	23 August 1987	Tallinn	
Hammer throw	67.91 m	Kati Ojaloo	26 June 2022	Tallinn	
Javelin throw	61.42 m	Moonika Aava	2 August 2004	Tallinn	
Heptathlon	6156 pts	Silva Oja	29 August 1982	Tallinn	
10000m walk (track)	45:51.85	Jekaterina Mirotvortseva	3 August 2025	Tallinn	

== See also ==
- Estonian Indoor Athletics Championships
- Tallinn Marathon
