= 2025 European Athletics Team Championships Second Division =

Below are the full startlists and, when confirmed, results of the 2025 European Athletics Team Championships Second Division on 28–29 June 2025 in Maribor, Slovenia.

== Overall standings ==
* Host nation (Slovenia)

Rank	Nation	Points	EW
1	Belgium	451.5	9
2	Slovenia	402.5	3
3	Norway	400	7
4	Turkey	382	3
5	Ireland	349	1
6	Denmark	335	0
7	Austria	318	4
8	Croatia	308.5	2
9	Slovakia	304.5	3
10	Romania	285	1
11	Estonia	266.5	0
12	Israel	258.5	3
13	Serbia	253	1
14	Cyprus	245.5	0
15	Bulgaria	240.5	0
16	Latvia	212	0

== Men's events ==
Key: WR= world record - ER = European Record - EL = 2023 European lead - CR = Championships record - NR = National record - NU23R = National Under-23 record

=== 100 metres ===
Place	Heat	Lane	Athlete	Nation	Time	Notes	Points
1	B	5	Per Tinius Fremstad-Waldron	Norway	10.46		16
2	A	5	Simon Hansen	Denmark	10.55		15
3	B	4	Oskars Grava	Latvia	10.56		14
4	A	8	Blessing Akwasi Afrifah	Israel	10.57		13
5	A	7	Jernej Gumilar	Slovenia	10.59		12
6	B	3	Markus Fuchs	Austria	10.59		11
7	B	7	Cristian Roiban	Romania	10.60		10
8	A	3	Toluwabori Akinola	Ireland	10.62		9
9	B	2	Roko Farkaš	Croatia	10.63		8
10	B	1	Stavros Avgoustinou	Cyprus	10.64		7
11	A	4	Simon Verherstraeten	Belgium	10.64		6
12	A	6	Kayhan Özer	Turkey	10.65		5
13	B	8	Aleksa Kijanović	Serbia	10.66		4
14	A	2	Ján Volko	Slovakia	10.78		3
15	A	1	Nikola Karamanolov	Bulgaria	10.84		2
–	B	6	Karl Erik Nazarov	Estonia		DNF	0

=== 200 metres ===
Place	Heat	Lane	Athlete	Nation	Time	Notes	Points
1	A	4	Blessing Akwasi Afrifah	Israel	20.31	SB	16
2	A	5	Simon Verherstraeten	Belgium	20.61		15
3	A	6	Oskars Grava	Latvia	20.65	PB	14
4	A	8	Mathias Hove Johansen	Norway	20.72	SB	13
5	A	3	Ján Volko	Slovakia	20.80		12
6	A	7	Marcus Lawler	Ireland	20.81		11
7	A	1	Andrej Skočir	Slovenia	20.81		10
8	A	2	Deniz Kaan Kartal	Turkey	20.82	PB	9
9	B	6	Henri Sai	Estonia	20.91	PB	8
10	B	5	Karlo Marciuš	Croatia	20.99		7
11	B	1	Hristo Iliev	Bulgaria	21.08	PB	6
12	B	7	Neloo Falck	Denmark	21.10		5
13	B	2	Alex Beechey	Cyprus	21.29	SB	4
14	B	3	Klaus Grünbart	Austria	21.35	PB	3
15	B	8	Darijo Bašić Palković	Serbia	21.36	PB	2
16	B	4	Remus Andrei Niculiță	Romania	21.54		1

=== 400 metres ===
Place	Heat	Lane	Athlete	Nation	Time	Notes	Points
1	A	5	Alexander Doom	Belgium	44.66	SB	16
2	A	3	Rok Ferlan	Slovenia	44.70	NR	15
3	A	6	Mihai Sorin Dringo	Romania	44.74	NR	14
4	A	4	Jack Raftery	Ireland	44.98	PB	13
5	A	8	Gustav Lundholm Nielsen	Denmark	45.46	SB	12
6	A	2	Ilyas Çanakçı	Turkey	45.86	PB	11
7	A	7	Håvard Bentdal Ingvaldsen	Norway	46.03		10
8	A	1	Matej Baluch	Slovakia	46.41	PB	9
9	B	8	Artūrs Pastors	Latvia	46.44	PB	8
10	B	5	Marko Orešković	Croatia	46.53	PB	6.5
10	B	6	Paisios Dimitriadis	Cyprus	46.53	PB	6.5
12	B	3	Darijo Bašić Palković	Serbia	46.81	PB	5
13	B	7	Andreas Wolf	Austria	47.05		4
14	B	2	Noam Mamu	Israel	47.18	PB	3
15	B	1	Ervin Markus Raudsepp	Estonia	47.71	PB	2
–	B	4	Todor Todorov	Bulgaria		DQ	0

=== 800 metres ===
Place	Heat	Lane	Athlete	Nation	Time	Notes	Points
1	A	6	Marino Bloudek	Croatia	1:46.22		16
2	A	5	Pieter Sisk	Belgium	1:46.29		15
3	A	4	Cian McPhillips	Ireland	1:46.37		14
4	A	7	Jan Vukovič	Slovenia	1:46.79		13
5	A	3	Uku Renek Kronbergs	Estonia	1:47.18		12
6	A	2	Sigurd Tveit	Norway	1:47.53		11
7	A	8	Cristian Gabriel Voicu	Romania	1:47.78		10
8	B	6	Salih Teksöz	Turkey	1:48.38	SB	9
9	B	3	Noam Mamu	Israel	1:49.61	SB	8
10	A	1	Filip Bielek	Slovakia	1:49.67		7
11	B	4	Nick Rostgaard Jensen	Denmark	1:49.85		6
12	B	5	Martin Balabanov	Bulgaria	1:50.04		5
13	B	7	Niklas Kainrath	Austria	1:50.08		4
14	B	8	Kārlis Ancāans	Latvia	1:51.06	PB	3
15	B	1	Aldin Ćatović	Serbia	1:51.57	PB	2
16	B	2	S. Baba Swaray	Cyprus	1:52.00	PB	1

=== 1500 metres ===
Place	Athlete	Nation	Time	Notes	Points
1	Ruben Verheyden	Belgium	3:42.58		16
2	Håkon Moe Berg	Norway	3:42.76		15
3	Shane Bracken	Ireland	3:42.92		14
4	Salih Teksöz	Turkey	3:43.87		13
5	Deniss Šalkauskas	Estonia	3:44.02	PB	12
6	Žan Rudolf	Slovenia	3:44.28		11
7	Martin Prodanov	Bulgaria	3:44.92		10
8	Nino Jambrešić	Croatia	3:44.97	SB	9
9	Marcel Tobler	Austria	3:45.84		8
10	Matan Ivri	Israel	3:46.23		7
11	Nicolae Marian Felix Coman	Romania	3:47.37		6
12	Gustav Bendsen	Denmark	3:47.87		5
13	Janis Razgalis	Latvia	3:48.44		4
14	Aldin Ćatović	Serbia	3:48.89	SB	3
15	Andrea Gacumi Michara	Cyprus	3:49.82	PB	2
16	Miroslav Borovka	Slovakia	3:56.36		1

=== 5000 metres ===
Place	Athlete	Nation	Time	Notes	Points
1	Isaac Kimeli	Belgium	13:55.70	SB	16
2	Brian Fay	Ireland	13:56.07		15
3	Joel Ibler Lillesø	Denmark	13:58.64	SB	14
4	Awet Nftalem Kibrab	Norway	13:58.85		13
5	Elzin Babić	Serbia	14:00.91	SB	12
6	Assaf Harari	Israel	14:01.83		11
7	Ramazan Baştuğ	Turkey	14:07.21		10
8	Peter Ďurec	Slovakia	14:10.42		9
9	Andreas Vojta	Austria	14:11.69		8
10	Jan Kokalj	Slovenia	14:18.91		7
11	Artūrs Niklāvs Medveds	Latvia	14:21.77		6
12	Tomislav Novosel	Croatia	14:25.95		5
13	Tiidrek Nurme	Estonia	14:27.66	SB	4
14	Ivo Balabanov	Bulgaria	14:33.58		3
15	Lucian Florin Ștefan	Romania	15:17.71		2
–	Amine Khadiri	Cyprus		DNF	0

=== 110 metres hurdles ===
Place	Heat	Lane	Athlete	Nation	Time	Notes	Points
1	A	5	Enzo Diessl	Austria	13.31		16
2	A	7	Filip Jakob Demšar	Slovenia	13.47	NR	15
3	A	3	Mikdat Sevler	Turkey	13.61	SB	14
4	A	6	Milan Trajkovic	Cyprus	13.75		13
5	A	8	Stanislav Stankov	Bulgaria	13.81	SB	12
6	A	4	Spencer Brown	Croatia	13.91		11
7	B	4	Andreas Christoffersen	Denmark	13.93	PB	10
8	B	8	Adam Ilgo	Slovakia	13.93	PB	9
9	B	7	Keiso Pedriks	Estonia	14.13	SB	8
10	A	2	Oron Karnivsky	Israel	14.17		7
11	B	6	Luka Trgovčević	Serbia	14.19	SB	6
12	B	5	Jonathan Hertwig-Ødegaard	Norway	14.20	PB	5
13	B	2	Mario Ștefan Cobjuc	Romania	14.38	PB	4
14	B	1	Camille Snyders	Belgium	15.23	PB	3
–	A	1	Adam Nolan	Ireland		DQ	0
–	B	3	Ralfs Zazerskis	Latvia		DQ	0

=== 400 metres hurdles ===
Place	Heat	Lane	Athlete	Nation	Time	Notes	Points
1	A	7	Patrik Dömötör	Slovakia	49.61		16
2	A	4	Mimoun Abdoul Wahab	Belgium	50.23		15
3	A	5	Niklas Strohmeyer-Dangl	Austria	50.75		14
4	A	2	Mitja Zubin	Slovenia	50.83		13
5	B	5	Sebastian Monneret	Denmark	51.04	PB	12
6	B	4	David Ștefan Damian	Romania	51.29	PB	11
7	A	8	Omri Shiff	Israel	51.63		10
8	A	3	Mihajlo Katanić	Serbia	51.96		9
9	B	7	Taavi Tšernjavski	Estonia	52.10		8
10	A	1	Andreas Haara Bakketun	Norway	52.29		7
11	B	3	Lovro Šourek	Croatia	54.44		6
12	B	2	Momchil Poptolev	Bulgaria	54.66		5
13	B	1	Emīls Sandlers-Bomis	Latvia	54.76		4
14	B	8	Anastasios Vasileiou	Cyprus	55.32		3
15	B	6	Fintan Dewhirst	Ireland	1:19.01		2
–	A	6	Berke Akçam	Turkey		DQ	0

=== 3000 metres steeplechase ===
Place	Athlete	Nation	Time	Notes	Points
1	Abdullah Tuğluk	Turkey	8:45.14		16
2	Tim Van De Velde	Belgium	8:47.74	SB	15
3	Zemenu Muchie	Israel	8:48.01	SB	14
4	Finley Daly	Ireland	8:51.89		13
5	Edgars Šumskis	Latvia	8:58.02		12
6	Bruno Belčić	Croatia	9:01.22	SB	11
7	Kalev Hõlpus	Estonia	9:04.89	PB	10
8	Khavaquiah Rasmusen	Denmark	9:07.87	SB	9
9	Klemen Vilhar	Slovenia	9:10.39		8
10	Dávid Mazúch	Slovakia	9:13.30		7
11	Pavel Zdravkov	Bulgaria	9:14.39	PB	5.5
11	Damian Didier Mititelu	Romania	9:14.39		5.5
13	Giorgos Tofi	Cyprus	9:31.54	SB	4
14	Bernhard Schmid	Austria	9:43.08		3
15	Nikola Boca	Serbia	10:08.07		2
–	Vebjørn Hovdejord	Norway		DNF	0

=== 4 × 100 metres relay ===
Place	Heat	Lane	Country	Athletes	Time	Notes	Points
1	A	5	Norway	Per Tinius Fremstad-Waldron, Jacob Vaula, Mathias Hove Johansen, Andreas Ofstad Kulseng	38.86	NR	16
2	B	5	Ireland	Michael Farrelly, Sean Aigboboh, Marcus Lawler, Israel Olatunde	38.88	NR	15
3	A	6	Slovenia	Jernej Gumilar, Matevž Šuštaršič, Andrej Skočir, Jurij Beber	39.12	NR	14
4	A	8	Denmark	Simon Hansen, Kojo Musah, Emil Frænde, Frederik Schou-Nielsen	39.20	SB	13
5	A	4	Belgium	Jordan Paquot, Antoine Snyders, Camille Snyders, Amine Kasmi	39.24	SB	12
6	A	2	Turkey	Ertan Özkan, Kayhan Özer, Batuhan Altıntaş, Ramil Guliyev	39.38	SB	11
7	B	2	Bulgaria	Georgi Petkov, Nikola Karamanolov, Venelin Kamburov, Hristo Iliev	39.62	SB	10
8	B	6	Austria	Vasily Klimov, Markus Fuchs, Klaus Grünbart, Lukas Pullnig	39.68	SB	9
9	B	3	Israel	Emmanuel Aka, Ido Peretz, Aviv Koffler, Blessing Akwasi Afrifah	39.80	SB	8
10	B	1	Latvia	Ralfs Zazerskis, Jānis Roberts Zālītis, Oskars Grava, Girts Šenkevics	39.90	SB	7
11	B	8	Serbia	Strahinja Jovančević, Marko Radosavljević, Bogdan Vidojković, Aleksa Kijanović	40.02	SB	6
12	B	7	Cyprus	Emmanouil Christodoulou, Stavros Avgoustinou, Alex Beechey, Milan Trajkovic	40.12	SB	5
13	B	4	Estonia	Rasmus Jaanson, Reimo Sepp, Henri Sai, Rain Kirsipuu	40.22	SB	4
14	A	7	Slovakia	Mário Hanic, Jakub Nemec, Miroslav Marček, Tomáš Štinčík	40.81	SB	3
–	A	3	Romania	Răzvan Valentin Stanciu, Cristian Roiban, Remus Andrei Niculiță, Andrei Marian		DQ	0
–	A	1	Croatia	Toma Batistić, Roko Farkaš, Mate Mišković, Marko Čeko		DNF	0

=== High jump ===
Place	Group	Athlete	Nation	1.89	1.94	1.99	2.04	2.09	2.13	2.16	2.19	2.22	2.25	2.27	2.29	Result	Notes	Points
1	A	Yonathan Kapitolnik	Israel	–	–	–	o	o	o	o	o	o	xxo	–	xxx	2.25		16
2	A	Jef Vermeiren	Belgium	–	–	–	o	o	–	o	o	x–	xx			2.19		14.5
2	A	Valentin Alexandru Androne	Romania	–	–	–	o	o	o	o	o	xxx				2.19	PB	14.5
4	A	Tihomir Ivanov	Bulgaria	–	–	–	–	o	o	o	x–	xx				2.16		13
5	A	David Cussen	Ireland	–	–	–	o	o	xo	o	x–	xx				2.16		12
6	A	Erlend Bolstad Raa	Norway	–	–	–	o	xxo	o	xx						2.13		11
7	A	Loizos Chrysostomou	Cyprus	–	–	o	o	o	xo	xxx						2.13		10
8	B	Lionel Afan Strasser	Austria	–	o	o	o	o	xxo	xx						2.13	SB	9
9	B	Yasir Kuduban	Turkey	–	–	o	o	xo	xxo	x						2.13	SB	8
10	A	Slavko Stević	Serbia	–	–	–	o	o	xxx							2.09		7
11	B	Marius Hytholm Petersen	Denmark	–	o	o	o	xo	xxx							2.09		6
12	B	Daniels Ģiedris	Latvia	o	o	o	o	xxx								2.04		4.5
12	B	Sandro Jeršin Tomassini	Slovenia	–	o	o	o	xxx								2.04		4.5
14	B	Andreas Hantson	Estonia	o	–	o	xo	xxx								2.04		2.5
14	B	Robert Ruffíni	Slovakia	–	o	o	xo	xxx								2.04		2.5
16	B	Filip Mrčić	Croatia	xo	o	xxo	x									1.99		1

=== Pole vault ===
Place	Group	Athlete	Nation	3.40	3.70	4.00	4.25	4.50	4.70	4.90	5.10	5.20	5.30	5.40	5.50	5.60	5.65	5.70	5.75	5.80	Result	Notes	Points
1	A	Ben Broeders	Belgium	–	–	–	–	–	–	–	–	–	o	–	xo	xo	–	o	–	xxx	5.70		16
2	A	Ersu Şaşma	Turkey	–	–	–	–	–	–	–	–	–	o	–	o	–	–	x–	xx		5.50		15
3	A	Robert Kompus	Estonia	–	–	–	–	–	–	–	xo	–	o	–	xo	–	xx				5.50	PB	14
4	A	Ivan Geronimo Šerić	Croatia	–	–	–	–	–	–	xo	–	–	o	–	xxo	x					5.50	SB	13
5	A	Simen Guttormsen	Norway	–	–	–	–	–	–	–	–	xo	–	o	xx–	x					5.40		12
6	A	Riccardo Klotz	Austria	–	–	–	–	–	–	–	xxo	–	o	xo	x						5.40	SB	11
7	A	Luka Zupanc	Slovenia	–	–	–	–	–	–	o	xo	–	xxo	x							5.30	PB	10
8	B	Adam Antalec	Slovakia	–	–	–	–	–	o	o	o	xo	xxx								5.20	PB	9
9	B	Nikolaj Hyldtoft Graves	Denmark	–	–	–	–	–	o	xo	o	xxr									5.10	PB	8
10	B	Christos Tamanis	Cyprus	–	–	–	–	–	xo	o	xo	xx									5.10	SB	7
11	B	Aleks Lyubenov	Bulgaria	–	–	–	–	–	o	o	xxx										4.90		6
12	B	Conor Callinan	Ireland	–	–	–	xo	o	o	o	xxx										4.90	PB	5
13	A	Nikita Mirkin	Israel	–	–	–	–	o	–	xxo	xx										4.90		3.5
13	B	Mareks Ārents	Latvia	–	–	–	–	–	–	xxo	xx										4.90		3.5
15	B	Dacian Costea	Romania	–	–	–	o	o	xxx												4.50		2
16	B	Uroš Amidžić	Serbia	o	o	o	xxx														4.00	PB	1

=== Long jump ===
Place	Athlete	Nation	#1	#2	#3	#4	#5	#6	Result	Notes	Points
1	Matúš Blšták	Slovakia	x	7.74	7.67	7.77	7.79	7.70	7.79	PB	16
2	Hans-Christian Hausenberg	Estonia	7.78	x	x	x	x	x	7.78	SB	15
3	Henrik Flåtnes	Norway	x	7.74	7.64	x	x	x	7.74		14
4	Marko Čeko	Croatia	x	7.58	7.46	x	7.33	x	7.58		13
5	Yanni Sampson	Belgium	x	x	7.58	x	7.39		7.58		12
6	Marko Vlahović	Serbia	x	x	7.54	x	7.51		7.54		11
7	Klemen Modrijančič	Slovenia	7.40	7.24	7.37	7.53	x		7.53		10
8	Cristian Andrei Sava	Romania	x	x	7.41	x	x		7.41		9
9	Aleksis Galītis	Latvia	7.30	7.38	x				7.38		8
10	Kasper Larsen	Denmark	7.24	x	x				7.24		7
11	Shane Howard	Ireland	x	7.11	7.20				7.20		6
12	Ishay Ifraimov	Israel	x	x	7.14				7.14		5
13	Leo Lasch	Austria	6.99	7.10	x				7.10		4
14	Antreas Machallekides	Cyprus	7.09	6.93	7.09				7.09	SB	3
15	Batuhan Çakır	Turkey	7.07	x	7.08				7.08		2
16	Vasil Rusenov	Bulgaria	6.90	x	x				6.90		1

=== Triple jump ===
Place	Athlete	Nation	#1	#2	#3	#4	#5	#6	Result	Notes	Points
1	Endiorass Kingley	Austria	x	16.52	x	16.85	16.77	16.48	16.85	NR, PB	16
2	Can Özüpek	Turkey	15.93	15.73	16.06	16.25	x	x	16.25		15
3	Lâchezar Vâlchev	Bulgaria	x	x	15.89	16.01	16.11	x	16.11		14
4	Henrik Flåtnes	Norway	15.56	15.91	r				15.91		13
5	Viktor Morozov	Estonia	15.78	x	x	15.88			15.88		12
6	Nikola Ilić	Serbia	15.41	x	15.84	x	15.08		15.84	PB	11
7	Sandis Dzenītis	Latvia	14.88	14.95	15.65	15.48	15.44		15.65	SB	10
8	Tomáš Veszelka	Slovakia	x	15.37	15.56	x	x		15.56		9
9	Răzvan Cristian Grecu	Romania	15.53	x	x				15.53		8
10	Marko Pestić	Croatia	15.11	15.45	15.30				15.45	PB	7
11	Antranik Sarkis Ashdjian	Cyprus	x	x	15.43				15.43	PB	6
12	Maj Cizera Turk	Slovenia	15.33	x	x				15.33		5
13	Michael Alajiki	Ireland	14.76	13.62	x				14.76		4
14	David Boda	Belgium	14.69	13.03	13.11				14.69		3
15	Guy Margalit	Israel	14.51	x	x				14.51		2
16	Jonathan Sass Møller	Denmark	14.22	x	x				14.22		1

=== Shot put ===
Place	Athlete	Nation	#1	#2	#3	#4	#5	#6	Result	Notes	Points
1	Marcus Thomsen	Norway	20.94	21.02	20.81	20.97	20.94	x	21.02		16
2	Armin Sinančević	Serbia	20.07	x	20.54	x	x	x	20.54		15
3	Andrei Rares Toader	Romania	19.47	x	x	19.79	20.30	x	20.30		14
4	Ali Peker	Turkey	17.92	18.82	19.56	x	18.91	x	19.56	PB	13
5	Eric Favors	Ireland	18.67	18.92	19.42	19.39	19.37		19.42		12
6	Todor Petrov	Bulgaria	17.48	17.66	17.90	x	17.70		17.90		11
7	Blaž Zupančič	Slovenia	17.80	x	x	16.85	17.34		17.80		10
8	Adrián Baran	Slovakia	17.36	17.50	x	17.56	x		17.56		9
9	Jan Ferina	Croatia	16.81	16.95	17.46				17.46	PB	8
10	Andreas De Lathauwer	Belgium	15.08	15.03	17.40				17.40		7
11	Menachem Mendel Chen	Israel	x	15.79	16.18				16.18		6
12	Christopher H. Jensen	Denmark	15.09	16.14	15.79				16.14		5
13	Andri Martov	Estonia	14.60	15.89	x				15.89		4
14	Matthias Krach	Austria	15.57	15.22	x				15.57		3
15	Vasilis Mouaimis	Cyprus	14.14	x	13.86				14.14		2
–	Ralfs Eduards Gauja	Latvia	x	x	x					NM	0

=== Discus throw ===
Place	Athlete	Nation	#1	#2	#3	#4	#5	#6	Result	Notes	Points
1	Kristjan Čeh	Slovenia	65.38	66.55	68.16	67.14	x	64.84	68.16		16
2	Lukas Weißhaidinger	Austria	62.20	62.26	63.82	63.33	64.88	x	64.88	SB	15
3	Alin Firfirică	Romania	62.55	63.19	x	60.61	63.81	62.05	63.81		14
4	Ömer Şahin	Turkey	52.76	58.04	60.52	60.63	61.77	62.62	62.62	PB	13
5	Martin Marković	Croatia	60.51	60.43	60.01	59.14	57.70		60.51		12
6	Ola Stunes Isene	Norway	x	x	58.56	59.90	59.67		59.90		11
7	Iosif Michalis Papa	Cyprus	55.68	55.47	58.81'	55.92	x		58.81		10
8	Kwinten Cools	Belgium	44.45	54.65	55.17	x	x		55.17		9
9	Aleksandrs Volkovs	Latvia	53.96	51.39	52.28				53.96		8
10	Deyan Gemizhev	Bulgaria	53.71	53.78	52.90				53.78		7
11	Emil Mikkelsen	Denmark	52.29	53.05	53.73				53.73		6
12	Denis Valiulin	Israel	50.36	x	53.15				53.15		5
13	Gevin Genro Paas	Estonia	51.77	51.84	50.53				51.84		4
14	Eoin Sheridan	Ireland	50.15	45.37	x				50.15		3
15	Samuel Kováč	Slovakia	48.04	49.65	48.27				49.65		2
16	Jovan Milivojević	Serbia	x	25.85	x				25.85		1

=== Hammer throw ===
Place	Athlete	Nation	#1	#2	#3	#4	#5	#6	Result	Notes	Points
1	Thomas Mardal	Norway	x	x	74.17	75.11	75.44	76.85	76.85		16
2	Özkan Baltacı	Turkey	72.98	x	72.51	x	74.58	x	74.58		15
3	Adam Kelly	Estonia	70.60	69.66	x	71.94	70.55	73.66	73.66		14
4	Iosif Kesidis	Cyprus	x	x	67.28	72.21	72.51	70.65	72.51		13
5	Marcel Lomnický	Slovakia	71.28	x	71.30	x	70.48		71.30		12
6	Valentin Andreev	Bulgaria	67.87	70.25	69.26	70.95	x		70.95		11
7	Matija Gregurić	Croatia	70.32	70.02	69.47	70.65	70.45		70.65		10
8	Jan Emberšič	Slovenia	68.33	69.28	69.29	70.05	70.18		70.18		9
9	Devlin Neyens	Belgium	x	63.37	65.48				65.48		8
10	Dragoș Ionuț Nicorici	Romania	64.91	x	x				64.91		7
11	Jovan Stranić	Serbia	62.51	62.81	64.55				64.55		6
12	Sean Mockler	Ireland	62.10	64.00	63.85				64.00		5
13	Rasmus Jensen	Denmark	59.90	60.26	x				60.26		4
14	Kilian Moser	Austria	57.09	55.73	56.62				57.09	SB	3
15	Egor Kniazev	Israel	56.37	x	56.48				56.48		2
16	Edgars Gailis	Latvia	52.92	x	54.03				54.03		1

=== Javelin throw ===
Place	Athlete	Nation	#1	#2	#3	#4	#5	#6	Result	Notes	Points
1	Daniel Thrana	Norway	72.35	77.99	71.21	76.34	79.03	80.24	80.24	PB	16
2	Arthur W. Petersen	Denmark	74.19	78.22	77.44	79.01	x	77.15	79.01	SB	15
3	Alexandru Novac	Romania	x	78.61	74.72	76.85	78.23	78.73	78.73		14
4	Timothy Herman	Belgium	72.94	77.52	74.04	75.60	75.04	x	77.52		13
5	Patrik Michalec	Slovakia	76.79	76.76	x	74.22	70.51		76.79	PB	12
6	Anže Durjava	Slovenia	74.68	73.17	x	71.65	68.90		74.68		11
7	Spyros Savva	Cyprus	60.35	67.72	71.45	71.09	73.37		73.37		10
8	Conor Cusack	Ireland	66.60	72.43	63.64	71.34	69.68		72.43		9
9	Gatis Čakšs	Latvia	71.12	69.62	x				71.12		8
10	Krešimir Galić	Croatia	65.57	71.11	x				71.11	PB	7
11	Muhammet Hanifi Zengin	Turkey	70.16	68.02	x				70.16		6
12	Laurenz Waldbauer	Austria	68.40	69.86	69.52				69.86		5
13	Kunnar Erich Viisel	Estonia	x	69.68	68.75				69.68		4
14	Branko Pokrajac	Serbia	52.89	x	54.27				54.27		3
15	Krasimir Velchev	Bulgaria	51.46	51.31	54.22				54.22	SB	2
16	Ariel Atias	Israel	51.93	x	x				51.93		1

== Women's events ==
=== 100 metres ===
Place	Heat	Lane	Athlete	Nation	Time	Notes	Points
1	A	5	Delphine Nkansa	Belgium	11.42		16
2	B	3	Lucija Potnik	Slovenia	11.57	PB	15
3	A	6	Viktória Forster	Slovakia	11.60		14
4	A	7	Ann Marii Kivikas	Estonia	11.61		13
5	A	8	Helene Rønningen	Norway	11.70		12
6	A	2	Magdalena Lindner	Austria	11.71		11
7	A	1	Radina Velichkova	Bulgaria	11.79		10
8	A	3	Olivia Fotopoulou	Cyprus	11.80		9
9	A	4	Lucy-May Sleeman	Ireland	11.84		8
10	B	6	Klara Skriver Loessl	Denmark	11.85		7
11	B	5	Beyzanur Seylan	Turkey	11.96		6
12	B	1	Ieva Malnača	Latvia	11.98		5
13	B	4	Alina Drutman	Israel	11.99		4
14	B	7	Zorica Ignjatović	Serbia	12.00		3
15	B	8	Maria Valeria Bisericescu	Romania	12.04		2
16	B	2	Vita Penezić	Croatia	12.14		1

=== 200 metres ===
Place	Heat	Lane	Athlete	Nation	Time	Notes	Points
1	A	6	Imke Vervaet	Belgium	22.85	PB	16
2	A	4	Olivia Fotopoulou	Cyprus	22.90	SB	15
3	B	5	Line Kloster	Norway	23.17	SB	14
4	A	3	Ann Marii Kivikas	Estonia	23.18	PB	13
5	A	5	Lauren Roy	Ireland	23.32		12
6	A	2	Sila Koloğlu	Turkey	23.39	PB	11
7	A	7	Maja Mihalinec Zidar	Slovenia	23.46		10
8	B	4	Kristen Radukanova	Bulgaria	23.55	PB	9
9	B	7	Celina Hagihara	Denmark	23.60	PB	8
10	A	8	Tamara Milutinović	Serbia	23.64		7
11	B	3	Veronika Drljačić	Croatia	23.65	SB	6
12	B	2	Viktoria Willhuber	Austria	23.89		5
13	B	8	Alina Drutman	Israel	23.91	PB	4
14	A	1	Agáta Cellerová	Slovakia	23.91		3
15	B	6	Ioana-Adnana Vrînceanu	Romania	23.95		2
16	B	1	Ieva Malnača	Latvia	24.01	PB	1

=== 400 metres ===
Place	Heat	Lane	Athlete	Nation	Time	Notes	Points
1	A	5	Emma Zapletalová	Slovakia	50.76	NR	16
2	A	7	Imke Vervaet	Belgium	50.86	PB	15
3	A	6	Sharlene Mawdsley	Ireland	50.93	SB	14
4	A	4	Andrea Miklós	Romania	51.35	SB	13
5	A	8	Veronika Drljačić	Croatia	51.72	PB	12
6	A	2	Živa Remic	Slovenia	52.23	PB	11
7	A	3	Kalliopi Kountouri	Cyprus	52.58	PB	10
8	B	7	Sila Koloğlu	Turkey	52.81	PB	9
9	A	1	Andrea Savova	Bulgaria	53.55		8
10	B	6	Anna Krab Scheibelein	Denmark	53.95	PB	7
11	B	4	Anna Mager	Austria	54.19	PB	6
12	B	8	Shani Zakay	Israel	54.73	SB	5
13	B	5	Aleksandra Pešić	Serbia	54.80		4
14	B	2	Hege-Lee Pielberg	Estonia	55.18	PB	3
15	B	3	Invida Mauriņa	Latvia	55.50		2
16	B	1	Malin Furuhaug	Norway	1:01.02	SB	1

=== 800 metres ===
Place	Heat	Lane	Athlete	Nation	Time	Notes	Points
1	A	6	Caroline Bredlinger	Austria	1:58.95	PB	16
2	A	5	Anita Horvat	Slovenia	1:59.78	SB	15
3	A	4	Pernille Karlsen Antonsen	Norway	2:01.01		14
4	A	8	Annemarie Nissen	Denmark	2:01.70	SB	13
5	A	1	Stavri Filippou	Cyprus	2:01.95	PB	12
6	B	4	Dilek Koçak	Turkey	2:03.29	SB	11
7	B	1	Lilyana Georgieva	Bulgaria	2:03.78	PB	10
8	A	2	Nina Vuković	Croatia	2:04.11		9
9	B	8	Sophia Zápotočná	Slovakia	2:04.72	PB	8
10	B	7	Cristina Daniela Bălan	Romania	2:04.88	SB	7
11	B	6	Tara Vučković	Serbia	2:04.99		6
12	B	3	Shanie Landen	Israel	2:06.50		5
13	B	2	Kelly Nevolihhin	Estonia	2:06.50	SB	4
14	B	5	Invida Mauriņa	Latvia	2:06.61		3
15	A	3	Vanessa Scaunet	Belgium	2:08.08		2
16	A	7	Sophie O'Sullivan	Ireland	2:12.87		1

=== 1500 metres ===
Place	Athlete	Nation	Time	Notes	Points
1	Şilan Ayyıldız	Turkey	4:17.02		16
2	Elise Vanderelst	Belgium	4:17.48		15
3	Ingeborg Østgård	Norway	4:20.18		14
4	Laura Nicholson	Ireland	4:20.48		13
5	Veronika Sadek	Slovenia	4:20.71		12
6	Adva Cohen	Israel	4:22.57		11
7	Lotte Seiler	Austria	4:23.01		10
8	Klara Andrijašević	Croatia	4:23.21		9
9	Anna Mark Helwigh	Denmark	4:26.29		8
10	Lilyana Georgieva	Bulgaria	4:27.35		7
11	Cristina Daniela Bălan	Romania	4:28.24		6
12	Amanda Radava	Latvia	4:29.61		5
13	Mejra Mehmedović	Serbia	4:29.95		4
14	Sophia Zápotočná	Slovakia	4:32.30		3
15	Maria Nikolaou	Cyprus	4:40.69	PB	2
16	Sophie O'Sullivan	Ireland	4:41.75		1

=== 5000 metres ===
Place	Athlete	Nation	Time	Notes	Points
1	Klara Lukan	Slovenia	15:09.56		16
2	Jana Van Lent	Belgium	15:37.51		15
3	Carina Reicht	Austria	15:53.27	PB	14
4	Karawan Halabi Kablan	Israel	15:55.08	PB	13
5	Bahar Yıldırım	Turkey	15:56.04		12
6	Roisin Flanagan	Ireland	16:04.21		11
7	Agate Caune	Latvia	16:09.82		10
8	Kristine Lande Dommersnes	Norway	16:24.69		9
9	Militsa Mircheva	Bulgaria	16:26.14		8
10	Katarina Smiljanec	Croatia	16:41.35		7
11	Nanna Bové	Denmark	16:41.53		6
12	Milica Tomašević	Serbia	17:08.23		5
13	Veronika Páleníková	Slovakia	17:19.33		4
14	Mădălina-Elena Sîrbu	Romania	17:34.17		3
15	Maria Papanastasiou	Cyprus	17:40.56		2
16	Johanna Ardel	Estonia	17:52.65	SB	1

=== 100 metres hurdles ===
Place	Heat	Lane	Athlete	Nation	Time	Notes	Points
1	B	4	Sarah Lavin	Ireland	12.82		16
2	B	3	Viktória Forster	Slovakia	12.86		15
3	B	5	Yanla Ndjip-Nyemeck	Belgium	12.89		14
4	B	6	Karin Strametz	Austria	12.99		13
5	B	2	Ida Beiter Bomme	Denmark	13.00		12
6	B	7	Nika Glojnarič	Slovenia	13.04		11
7	A	4	Mia Wild	Croatia	13.18		10
8	A	5	Anamaria Nesteriuc	Romania	13.24		9
9	B	1	Kreete Verlin	Estonia	13.27		8
10	B	8	Milica Emini	Serbia	13.28		7
11	A	2	Alexsandra Lokshin	Israel	13.31	PB	6
12	A	6	Dafni Georgiou	Cyprus	13.39	SB	5
13	A	3	Cansu Nimet Sayın	Turkey	13.46		4
14	A	1	Line Kloster	Norway	13.51	PB	3
15	A	7	Marta Sivina	Latvia	13.86		2
16	A	8	Nikol Andonova	Bulgaria	14.15		1

=== 400 metres hurdles ===
Place	Heat	Lane	Athlete	Nation	Time	Notes	Points
1	A	6	Naomi Van Den Broeck	Belgium	55.33		16
2	A	4	Amalie Iuel	Norway	55.51		15
3	A	5	Daniela Ledecká	Slovakia	56.23		14
4	A	7	Natalija Švenda	Croatia	57.08		13
5	A	8	Alexandra Ștefania Uță	Romania	57.50		12
6	A	2	Anja Dlauhy	Austria	57.74		11
7	B	6	Maja Gajić	Serbia	58.05	SB	10
8	B	7	Mia Lisett Meringo	Estonia	58.06	PB	9
9	A	3	Martha Rasmussen	Denmark	58.24		8
10	B	8	Noah Levy	Israel	58.44	SB	7
11	B	5	Kalypso Stavrou	Cyprus	58.45	PB	6
12	A	1	Gülşah Cebeci	Turkey	58.46	PB	5
13	B	3	Uršula Černelč	Slovenia	58.79	PB	4
14	B	4	Arlene Crossan	Ireland	59.14	PB	3
15	B	2	Kristina Borukova	Bulgaria	1:01.21		2
16	B	1	Emīlija Vīksna	Latvia	1:03.92	PB	1

=== 3000 metres steeplechase ===
Place	Athlete	Nation	Time	Notes	Points
1	Adva Cohen	Israel	9:32.43		16
2	Eline Dalemans	Belgium	9:33.04		14.5
2	Juliane Hvid	Denmark	9:39.26	SB	14.5
4	Ava O'Connor	Ireland	9:45.09		13
5	Tuğba Güvenç Yenığün	Turkey	9:56.30		12
6	Laura Maasik	Estonia	10:04.02	SB	11
7	Lena Millonig	Austria	10:06.36		10
8	Karin Gošek	Slovenia	10:21.78		9
9	Maria Mihaela Blaga	Romania	10:28.01		8
10	Mejra Mehmedović	Serbia	10:40.88		7
11	Evelīna Krista Sitnika	Latvia	10:48.85	SB	6
12	Chrystalla Chadjipolydorou	Cyprus	10:52.17	SB	5
13	Tea Faber	Croatia	10:59.13		4
14	Petra Šuleková	Slovakia	11:00.81	PB	3
15	Bilserin Syuleyman	Bulgaria	11:27.47		2

=== 4 × 100 metres relay ===
Place	Heat	Lane	Country	Athletes	Time	Notes	Points
1	A	7	Belgium	Janie De Naeyer, Lotte Van Lent, Lien Torfs, Delphine Nkansa	43.46	SB	16
2	A	8	Denmark	Ida Beiter Bomme, Klara Skriver Loessl, Celina Hagihara, Amaya Kruse Jørgensen	43.94	SB	15
3	B	5	Ireland	Sarah Leahy, Ciara Neville, Lauren Roy, Sarah Lavin	43.97	SB	14
4	B	7	Estonia	Miia Ott, Anna Maria Millend, Kreete Verlin, Ann Marii Kivikas	43.98	NR	13
5	A	5	Slovenia	Lucija Potnik, Lina Hribar, Joni Tomičič Prezelj, Maja Mihalinec Zidar	44.15	SB	12
6	B	6	Austria	Patricia Brunninger, Magdalena Lindner, Isabel Posch, Viktoria Willhuber	44.16	SB	11
7	A	2	Turkey	Büşra Akay, Sila Koloğlu, Simay Özçiftçı, Beyzanur Seylan	44.61	NRU23	10
8	B	4	Cyprus	Dafni Georgiou, Mariliza Pittaka, Filippa Fotopoulou, Olivia Fotopoulou	44.94	SB	9
9	A	4	Slovakia	Viktória Forster, Lenka Kovačovicová, Viktória Strýčková, Delia Farajpour	44.98	SB	8
10	A	1	Croatia	Vita Penezić, Mia Wild, Melani Bosić, Veronika Drljačić	45.03	NR	7
11	B	3	Serbia	Milica Emini, Ivana Ilić, Tamara Milutinović, Zorica Ignjatović	45.18	SB	6
12	B	1	Bulgaria	Nikol Andonova, Kristen Radukanova, Mila Dimitrova, Radina Velichkova	45.21	SB	5
13	B	8	Israel	Mili Tunkel, Alina Drutman, Darlene Asante, Linoy Levy	45.73	SB	4
14	A	3	Romania	Ana-Maria Dogan, Andreea Luiza Ogrăzeanu, Ioana-Adnana Vrînceanu, Anamaria Nesteriuc	45.81	SB	3
–	A	6	Norway	Helene Rønningen, Line Kloster, Malin Furuhaug, Ida Andrea Breigan		DQ	0
–	B	2	Latvia	Ieva Malnača, Vendija Mauriņa, Elizabete Kociṇa, Beāte Buka		DQ	0

=== High jump ===
Place	Group	Athlete	Nation	1.54	1.59	1.64	1.69	1.74	1.79	1.83	1.86	1.89	1.91	1.93	1.95	Result	Notes	Points
1	A	Merel Maes	Belgium	–	–	–	–	–	o	o	o	xo	xo	o	xxx	1.93	=PB	16
2	A	Angelina Topić	Serbia	–	–	–	–	–	o	o	o	o	xxo	xo	x	1.93		15
3	A	Elena Kulichenko	Cyprus	–	–	–	–	–	–	o	xo	o	xxx			1.89		14
4	A	Buse Savaşkan	Turkey	–	–	–	–	–	xo	o	xxo	x				1.86		13
5	A	Jana Koščak	Croatia	–	–	o	o	o	xxo	o	xx					1.83		12
6	A	Lia Apostolovski	Slovenia	–	–	–	–	o	o	xo	xxx					1.83		11
7	B	Mia Guldteig Lien	Norway	–	–	o	o	o	xo	xo	xx					1.83	=PB	10
8	A	Elisabeth Pihela	Estonia	–	–	–	–	o	xo	xxo	x					1.83		9
9	B	Michaela Lenhartová	Slovakia	–	o	o	xo	xxo	o	x						1.79	PB	8
10	B	Iren Sarâboyukova	Bulgaria	–	–	–	o	xo	xo	xx						1.79		7
11	A	Daniela Stanciu	Romania	–	–	–	–	o	xr							1.74		5
11	B	Karla Schärfe	Denmark	–	o	o	o	o	xxx							1.74		5
11	B	Sofija Petrova	Latvia	–	–	o	o	o	xxx							1.74		5
14	B	Aoife O'Sullivan	Ireland	–	–	o	o	xxo	xx							1.74		3
15	B	Christiane Krifka	Austria	–	–	o	o	xxx								1.69		2
16	B	Roni Hovav	Israel	o	xo	o	xxx									1.64		1

=== Pole vault ===
Place	Group	Athlete	Nation	2.60	2.80	3.00	3.20	3.40	3.60	3.80	4.00	4.15	4.30	4.40	4.50	4.55	4.60	4.65	4.70	4.83	Result	Notes	Points
1	A	Tina Šutej	Slovenia	–	–	–	–	–	–	–	–	–	o	o	o	–	o	o	xo	xxx	4.70		16
2	A	Elien Vekemans	Belgium	–	–	–	–	–	–	–	–	–	o	o	o	–	xo	xxx			4.65	NR	15
3	A	Lene Onsrud Retzius	Norway	–	–	–	–	–	–	–	–	o	o	xxo	o	xx					4.50	SB	14
4	A	Lisa Gruber	Austria	–	–	–	–	–	–	o	o	o	xxx								4.15	PB	13
5	A	Alisona Diāna Neidere	Latvia	–	–	–	–	–	–	–	xxo	o	xxx								4.15		12
6	A	Demet Parlak	Turkey	–	–	–	–	–	–	o	o	xxx									4.00		11
7	B	Anne Sofie Hyldtoft Graves	Denmark	–	–	–	–	o	o	xo	xxx										3.80		10
8	B	Antreana Panteli	Cyprus	–	–	–	–	xo	o	xo	xx										3.80	PB	9
9	B	Liana Boľošová	Slovakia	–	–	o	xo	o	o	xxx											3.60		8
10	B	Clodagh Walsh	Ireland	–	–	–	o	o	xxx												3.40		7
11	B	Valentina-Iulia Necoară	Romania	–	–	–	o	xo	xxx												3.40		6
12	B	Mariya Kapusheva	Bulgaria	–	–	–	xo	xo	xxx												3.40		5
13	B	Ema Cetušić Jakopović	Croatia	–	–	–	o	–	xxx												3.20		4
14	B	Virág Bácsi	Serbia	xo	o	xxx															2.80	PB	3
–	A	Marleen Mülla	Estonia	–	–	–	–	–	–	–	–	xxx										NM	0
–	A	Yarden Mantel	Israel	–	–	–	–	–	xxx													NM	0

=== Long jump ===
Place	Athlete	Nation	#1	#2	#3	#4	#5	#6	Result	Notes	Points
1	Milica Gardašević	Serbia	6.75	x	x	6.57	6.47	r	6.75	SB	16
2	Ida Andrea Breigan	Norway	6.32	6.35	6.38	6.60	–	6.00	6.60	NU23R	15
3	Plamena Mitkova	Bulgaria	x	6.26	x	6.43	x	x	6.43		14
4	Elizabeth Ndudi	Ireland	6.26	5.99	5.76	5.75	x	x	6.26		13
5	Lishanna Ilves	Estonia	6.22	x	x	6.12	x		6.22		12
6	Paula Perončíková	Slovakia	6.11	6.19	6.12	6.14	6.04		6.19		11
7	Saliyya Guisse	Belgium	6.18	x	x	x	x		6.18	SB	10
8	Filippa Fotopoulou	Cyprus	6.07	x	x	x	–		6.07		9
9	Annette Nielsen	Denmark	5.88	5.48	6.05				6.05		8
10	Maja Bedrač	Slovenia	5.86	x	6.01				6.01		7
11	Ramona Elena Verman	Romania	5.98	x	x				5.98		6
12	Adriana Krūzmane	Latvia	x	5.83	5.92				5.92		5
13	Magdalena Perić	Croatia	5.74	x	5.86				5.86		4
14	Nur Arı	Turkey	x	5.68	5.86				5.86		3
15	Romi Tamir	Israel	5.86	x	x				5.86		2
16	Moyo Bardi	Austria	x	5.85	x				5.85		1

=== Triple jump ===
Place	Athlete	Nation	#1	#2	#3	#4	#5	#6	Result	Notes	Points
1	Elena Andreea Taloș	Romania	x	13.61	13.54	14.18	14.09	x	14.18		16
2	Ivana Španović	Serbia	13.94	13.94	14.15	13.88	r		14.15	SB	15
3	Tuğba Danışmaz	Turkey	x	13.96	x	x	14.00	x	14.00		14
4	Gabriela Petrova	Bulgaria	13.79	13.86	x	11.92	13.97	x	13.97		13
5	Ilona Masson	Belgium	13.49	13.96	13.52	x	x		13.96		12
6	Neja Filipič	Slovenia	12.99	x	x	13.92	13.81		13.92		11
7	Janne Nielsen	Denmark	13.86	x	x	x	x		13.86		10
8	Adriana Krūzmane	Latvia	12.63	12.97	13.08	13.32	13.13		13.32	PB	9
9	Paola Borović	Croatia	x	12.99	x	x	x		12.99		8
10	Saragh Buggy	Ireland	12.87	x	12.96				12.96	SB	7
11	Tamara Balajová	Slovakia	x	12.85	12.61				12.85	PB	6
12	Lillian Washington	Norway	12.59	12.40	11.93				12.59	SB	5
13	Viktoria Straczek-Helios	Austria	12.52	x	12.50				12.52		4
14	Polina Eskina	Israel	x	x	12.46				12.46		3
15	Christonymfi Paidiou	Cyprus	x	11.68	12.21				12.21		2
16	Daria O'Konnel-Bronin	Estonia	x	x	x				NM		0

=== Shot put ===
Place	Athlete	Nation	#1	#2	#3	#4	#5	#6	Result	Notes	Points
1	Emel Dereli	Turkey	15.71	x	x	x	16.23	x	16.23		16
2	Estel Valeanu	Israel	15.10	15.59	15.32	x	14.75	16.09	16.09		15
3	Elena Defrère	Belgium	14.63	14.63	15.10	14.92	14.73	15.80	15.80		14
4	Lucija Leko	Croatia	14.92	x	15.68	x	x	x	15.68		13
5	Nuša Lužnik	Slovenia	13.53	14.95	13.73	x	14.50		14.95	PB	12
6	Nickoline Skifter Andersen	Denmark	14.48	13.10	13.82	13.85	14.82		14.82		11
7	Niamh Fogarty	Ireland	13.78	14.29	x	13.78	13.87		14.29	PB	10
8	Anđela Obradović	Serbia	13.96	13.25	13.47	13.85	x		13.96		9
9	Sophie Kreiner	Austria	13.22	13.93	x				13.93	PB	8
10	Lilian Turban	Estonia	13.73	x	13.68				13.68		7
11	Mariell Morken	Norway	13.65	13.67	13.65				13.67		6
12	Luīze Geistarde	Latvia	13.48	13.29	x				13.48		5
13	Monika Marjová	Slovakia	13.48	x	x				13.48		4
14	Paraskevoulla Thrasyvoulou	Cyprus	11.70	x	13.11				13.11		3
15	Adina Ionela Fîrțală	Romania	12.88	x	x				12.88		2
16	Ivelina Milkova	Bulgaria	12.37	x	x				12.37		1

=== Discus throw ===
Place	Athlete	Nation	#1	#2	#3	#4	#5	#6	Result	Notes	Points
1	Sandra Elkasević	Croatia	62.87	x	61.83	x	60.86	x	62.87		16
2	Lisa Brix Pedersen	Denmark	53.40	55.47	56.80	55.51	58.88	x	58.88		15
3	Özlem Becerek	Turkey	56.59	x	x	x	x	54.34	56.59		14
4	Estel Valeanu	Israel	52.54	53.57	53.03	51.70	51.50	x	53.57		13
5	Niamh Fogarty	Ireland	52.20	x	x	x	51.75		52.20		12
6	Vineta Krūmiņa	Latvia	41.43	50.70	45.41	49.95	51.22		51.22	PB	11
7	Veronika Domjan	Slovenia	47.59	49.30	x	x	50.71		50.71		10
8	Andreea Iuliana Lungu	Romania	49.61	49.06	48.73	x	48.85		49.61		9
9	Djeneba Touré	Austria	49.01	x	x				49.01		8
10	Babette Vandeput	Belgium	48.38	x	x				48.38		7
11	Mette-Elise Ødegård Vaskinn	Norway	47.21	x	44.29				47.21		6
12	Paraskevoulla Thrasyvoulou	Cyprus	47.05	45.05	x				47.05		5
13	Milica Poznanović	Serbia	42.58	x	46.81				46.81		4
14	Ivelina Milkova	Bulgaria	43.78	x	41.55				43.78		3
15	Katarina Verst	Estonia	40.94	43.72	x				43.72		2
16	Jana Bódiková	Slovakia	41.93	43.68	x				43.68		1

=== Hammer throw ===
Place	Athlete	Nation	#1	#2	#3	#4	#5	#6	Result	Notes	Points
1	Beatrice Nedberge Llano	Norway	69.95	68.68	69.48	67.46	71.14	70.73	71.14		16
2	Bianca Ghelber	Romania	68.88	68.44	67.27	68.45	70.46	70.62	70.62		15
3	Nicola Tuthill	Ireland	x	x	68.30	70.50	x	x	70.50		14
4	Katrine Koch Jacobsen	Denmark	70.49	x	x	68.12	66.13	69.82	70.49		13
5	Valentina Savva	Cyprus	67.08	69.56	x	x	67.41		69.56		12
6	Veronika Kaňuchová	Slovakia	61.71	62.95	x	63.94	64.72		64.72		11
7	Anna Maria Čeh	Estonia	62.63	59.59	62.99	62.33	63.65		63.65		10
8	Deniz Sivridemiri	Turkey	59.35	59.19	56.56	59.62	58.47		59.62		9
9	Manon Beernaert	Belgium	57.53	58.96	x				58.96		8
10	Aleksandra Ivanović	Serbia	55.84	x	57.47				57.47		7
11	Oriana Lovrec	Slovenia	52.20	54.66	x				54.66		6
12	Lucija Pendić	Croatia	x	x	53.26				53.26		5
13	Evgenia Zabolotni	Israel	51.99	51.61	52.42				52.42		4
14	Leonie Moser	Austria	x	x	49.09				49.09		3
15	Teodora Andreeva	Bulgaria	47.70	x	x				47.70		2
16	Elīna Lazdoviča	Latvia	x	45.27	44.81				45.27		1

=== Javelin throw ===
Place	Athlete	Nation	#1	#2	#3	#4	#5	#6	Result	Notes	Points
1	Victoria Hudson	Austria	59.74	67.76	61.08	x	60.49	62.07	67.76	WL, NR	16
2	Sigrid Borge	Norway	56.91	58.21	59.94	65.66	x	61.47	65.66	SB	15
3	Adriana Vilagoš	Serbia	61.51	60.09	56.85	55.81	62.75	x	62.75		14
4	Anete Sietiņa	Latvia	56.42	x	59.84	61.36	60.04	61.11	61.36	SB	13
5	Esra Türkmen	Turkey	56.23	58.55	x	58.29	54.85		58.55	PB	12
6	Sara Kolak	Croatia	56.22	x	56.46	x	56.97		56.97		11
7	Gedly Tugi	Estonia	50.73	56.74	53.04	52.35	51.65		56.74		10
8	Martina Ratej	Slovenia	47.14	53.06	48.85	x	x		53.06	SB	9
9	Christiana Ellina	Cyprus	47.15	51.49	48.96				51.49		8
10	Pauline Smal	Belgium	47.97	50.00	x				50.00	SB	7
11	Karla Schärfe	Denmark	49.48	49.77	x				49.77		6
12	Petra Hanuliaková	Slovakia	48.67	48.77	46.45				48.77		5
13	Margaryta Dorozhon	Israel	42.90	41.73	45.38				45.38		4
14	Grace Casey	Ireland	42.33	x	37.40				42.33		3
15	Lili Stoycheva-Ivanova	Bulgaria	41.78	41.37	42.25				42.25		2
16	Andreea Iuliana Lungu	Romania	13.30	r					13.30	SB	1

== Mixed event ==
=== 4 x 400 metres relay ===
Place	Heat	Lane	Country	Athletes	Time	Notes	Points
1	A	7	Norway	Andreas Ofstad Kulseng, Amalie Iuel, Håvard Bentdal Ingvaldsen, Henriette Jæger	3:13.64	NR	16
2	B	7	Slovakia	Patrik Dömötör, Daniela Ledecká, Matej Baluch, Emma Zapletalová	3:14.05	SB	15
3	B	6	Romania	Mihai Dringo, Alexandra Ștefania Uță, Mario Alexandru Dobrescu, Andrea Miklós	3:14.71	NR	14
4	A	8	Ireland	Jack Raftery, Cliodhna Manning, Callum Baird, Sharlene Mawdsley	3:14.81	SB	13
5	A	5	Slovenia	Rok Ferlan, Maja Pogorevc, Lovro Mesec Košir, Anita Horvat	3:15.71	SB	12
6	A	6	Belgium	Jonathan Sacoor, Vanessa Scaunet, Daniel Segers, Naomi Van den Broeck	3:17.01	SB	11
7	A	2	Austria	Niklas Strohmeyer-Dangl, Helene Vogel, Andreas Wolf, Caroline Bredlinger	3:20.62	SB	10
8	A	4	Turkey	Kubilay Ençü, Gülşah Cebeci, Ilyas Çanakçı, Eda Nur Tulum	3:21.72	SB	9
9	B	1	Bulgaria	Vasil Antonov, Kristina Petkova, Todor Todorov, Andrea Savova	3:22.67	SB	8
10	A	1	Croatia	Dominik Jezernik, Eva Mačković, Marko Orešković, Natalija Švenda	3:22.85	SB	7
11	A	3	Denmark	Gustav Lindholm Nielsen, Anna Krab Scheibelein, Nick Rostgaard Jensen, Anne Sofie Kirkegaard	3:23.15	NR	6
12	B	3	Serbia	Mihajlo Katanić, Maja Gajić, Darijo Bašić Palković, Aleksandra Pešić	3:24.00	SB	5
13	B	5	Israel	Mohamed Abu Anza, Shani Zakay, Omri Shiff, Gal Natanel	3:24.04	NR	4
14	B	4	Estonia	Rain Kirsipuu, Mia Lisett Meringo, Uku Renek Kronbergs, Viola Hambidge	3:24.10	SB	3
15	B	8	Cyprus	Markos Antoniades, Thekla Alexandrou, Paisios Dimitriadis, Kalliopi Kountouri	3:25.49	NR	2
16	B	2	Latvia	Aleksandrs Tiščenko, Invida Mauriṇa, Artūrs Pastors, Emīlija Vīksna	3:26.80	SB	1

== See also ==
- 2025 European Athletics Team Championships First Division
- 2025 European Athletics Team Championships Third Division
