= Estonian Indoor Athletics Championships =

- Sport: Indoor track and field
- Founded: 1963
- Country: Estonia

The Estonian Indoor Athletics Championships (Estonian: Eesti talvised meistrivõistlused kergejõustikus) is an annual indoor track and field competition organised by the Estonian Athletic Association, which serves as the national championship for the sport in Estonia. First held in 1963, the competition was established during the period of Soviet occupation, thus was limited to a sub-national scope for the Estonian Soviet Socialist Republic, as Estonia's athletes still competed at the national Soviet Indoor Athletics Championships. The Estonian Indoor Championships became the undisputed official national-level event for Estonia in 1992, following the dissolution of the Soviet Union.

Combined events Estonian championships are usually held at Tallinn Indoor Meeting.

== Events ==
The following athletics events feature as standard on the Estonian Indoor Championships programme:

- Sprint: 60 m, 200 m, 400 m
- Distance track events: 800 m, 1500 m, 3000 m
- Hurdles: 60 m hurdles
- Jumps: long jump, triple jump, high jump, pole vault
- Throws: shot put
- Combined events: heptathlon (men), pentathlon (women)
- Walks: 5000 m walk (men), 3000 m walk (women)

The 200 m was first introduced in 1996. Women's triple jump was added in 1993 and women's pole vault in 1997 (in line with changes made at the international level in the period).

== Championships records ==
=== Men ===
Event	Record	Athlete/Team	Date	Place	Ref.
60 m					
200 m					
400 m					
800 m	1:48.10	Uku Renek Kronbergs	1 March 2026	Tallinn	
1500 m					
3000 m	8:06.66	Deniss Šalkauskas	1 March 2026	Tallinn	
60 m hurdles	7.72	Keiso Pedriks	27 February 2022	Tallinn	
High jump	2.27 m NR	Marko Aleksejev	15 February 2004	Tallinn	
Pole vault					
Long jump					
Triple jump					
Shot put					
Heptathlon					
5000 m walk					
4 × 400 m relay	3:14.81 NR	Audentese SK; Sten Ander Sepp; Karl Erik Nazarov; Erik Jagor; Tony Nõu	18 February 2018	Tallinn	

=== Women ===
Event	Record	Athlete/Team	Date	Place	Ref.
60 m	7.29 NR	Ksenija Balta	27 February 2016	Tallinn	
200 m					
400 m					
800 m					
1500 m					
3000 m					
60 m hurdles	7.99	Kreete Verlin	1 March 2026	Tallinn	
High jump					
Pole vault					
Long jump					
Triple jump	14.26 m NR	Kaire Leibak	9 February 2008	Tartu	
Shot put					
Pentathlon					
3000 m walk	13:08.03 NR	Jekaterina Mirotvortseva	22 February 2025	Tallinn	
4 × 400 m relay	3:48.75 NR	Tartu Ülikooli ASK; Liis Roose; Karmen Veerme; Grit Šadeiko; Maris Mägi	22 February 2015	Tallinn	

=== Mixed ===
Event	Record	Team	Date	Place	Ref.
4 × 400 m relay	3:30.57 NR	Tartu SS Kalev; Marielle Kleemeier; Anette Pets; Karl Robert Saluri; Uku-Renek Kronbergs	27 February 2022	Tallinn	

== See also ==
- Estonian Athletics Championships
