= Niamh Fogarty =

Irish athlete (born 1999)

Personal information
- Born: 16 May 1999 (age 27)

Sport
- Sport: Athletics
- Events: Discus throw, Shot put

Achievements and titles
- Personal bests: Discus: 58.40m (Ramona, 2025) NR; Shot put: 15.08m (Hvidovre, 2025)

Niamh Fogarty (born 16 May 1999) is an Irish discus thrower and shot putter. She is a multiple-time national champion and the Irish national record holder in the discus throw.

== Biography ==
From Westmeath, Fogarty was a student of Technological University of the Shannon: Midlands Midwest in Athlone, graduating with a master's degree. She worked as a strength and conditioning coach for Westmeath Ladies in Gaelic Football.

Fogarty first made the podium in the discus throw at the Irish Athletics Championships in 2016, winning bronze. She won the event for the first time the following year. In 2019, she reached the final at the 2019 European Athletics U23 Championships in Gävle, Sweden, and finished seventh with a throw of 51.57 m.

After winning a number of further national titles, she also placed third in the shot put event in 2024. She is a member of Raheny Shamrock Athletics Club in Ireland, having also previously been coached in Denmark by Michael Bruun Jepsen at the Hvidovre Atletik & Motion athletics club in Copenhagen.

=== National record holder ===
Fogarty represented Ireland at the 2025 European Throwing Cup in Cyprus. Fogarty then set a new Irish record with a throw of 58.40 metres on 27 April 2025 at the Oklahoma Throws Series in Ramona, Oklahoma in the United States. The previous record of 57.60m had been held by Patricia Walsh since the 1984 Olympic Games. Fogarty was selected as Irish team captain for the 2025 European Athletics Team Championships Second Division in Maribor, Slovenia, in June 2025, where she produced a lifetime best of 14.29 metres in the shot put to place seventh. In August, she won national titles in both the discus (55.08m) and shot put (14.29m) at the 2025 Irish Athletics Championships. Later that month, she improved her shot put personal best to 15.08 metres whilst competing in Hvidovre, Denmark.
