= Ann Marii Kivikas =

Estonian sprinter (born 2002)

Personal information
- Born: 12 August 2002 (age 24)

Sport
- Sport: Athletics
- Event: Sprint

Achievements and titles
- Personal bests: 60m: 7.29 (2025); 100m: 11.35 (2025) NR; 200m: 23.04 (2025) NR

Ann Marii Kivikas (born 12 August 2002) is an Estonian sprinter. She is a multiple-time national champion and competed over 200 metres at the 2025 World Athletics Championships.

== Biography ==
Kivikas attendee Pärnu Sports School and is a member of SK Altius athletics club. She gained her first international experience in the 100 metres at the 2018 European Athletics U18 Championships in Győr, Hungary. She also competed in the 200 metres at the 2018 Youth Olympic Games in Buenos Aires, Argentina.

Kivikas ran a personal best time of 11.64 seconds in the women's 100 metres semi-final at the 2023 European Athletics U23 Championships in Espoo, Finland, but did not qualify for the final.

She ran as part of the Estonian 4 × 100 m relay team at the 2024 World Relays Championships in Nassau, Bahamas in May 2024. In June 2024, She represented her country at the 2024 European Athletics Championships in Rome, Italy, without advancing the semi-finals of the 200 metres. She also competed in the women's 4 x 100 metres relay at the championships.

In January 2025, Kivikas ran a personal best of 7.31 seconds for the 60 metres, repeating the time later that same month. In March, Kivikas set a personal best of 7.29 for the 60 metres at the 2025 European Athletics Indoor Championships in Apeldoorn, Netherlands. She subsequently competed over 60 metres at the 2025 World Athletics Indoor Championships in Nanjing, China, without advancing to the semi-final.

In June 2025, she was part of the Estonian women's 4 x 100 metres relay team which set a new national record whilst competing at the 2025 European Athletics Team Championships Second Division in Maribor, running 43.98 seconds alongside Anna Maria Millend, Kreete Verlin and Miia Ott. Kivikas won both the 100m and 200m races at the 2025 Estonian Championships, equalling the Estonian 100m record of 11.35 seconds of Ksenija Balta. In the 200m she ran 23.27 seconds which set a new Estonian championship record. Kivikas set a personal best of 23.04 seconds for the 200 metres in 2025, also a national record. In September 2025, she competed in the 200 metres at the 2025 World Championships in Tokyo, Japan, running 23.14 seconds without advancing to the semi-finals.

Kivikas won the 60 metres at the Estonian Indoor Championships in February 2026, running 7.35 seconds. The following day, she ran 23.89 seconds to also win the 200 metres. In August 2026, she competed at the 2026 European Athletics Championships in Birmingham, England, in the women's 200 metres, reaching the semi-finals. She also competed in the women's 100 metres at the championships, equalling the Estonian national record of 11.35 seconds.
