= Tarmo Jallai =

Estonian hurdler (born 1979)

Personal information
- Born: 30 January 1979 (age 47) Tartu, then part of Estonian SSR, Soviet Union
- Height: 1.94 m (6 ft 4 in)
- Weight: 91 kg (201 lb)

Sport
- Country: Estonia
- Sport: Athletics
- Event: 110 metres hurdles
- Club: Texas A&M University

Achievements and titles
- Personal best: 110 m hs: 13.62 (Xalapa 2006) NR

Tarmo Jallai (30 January 1979) is a retired Estonian track and field athlete who competed in the 2004 Summer Olympic Games in Athens where he finished in 37th place in the men's 110 metres hurdles event.

Born in Tartu, Estonia, Jallai attended schools in his native country before studying at Texas A&M University–Kingsville in the United States where he competed for the school on the men's track and field team, the Javelinas from 2003 to 2006. In 2006, Jallai competed at the Xalapa Gala Banamex Veracruz and broke the Estonian record for the 110 metres hurdles in 13.62 seconds - a record that is still unbroken by a fellow countryman. He has also competed in the 23rd Universiade in 2005, the 19th European Athletics Championships in 2006, the IAAF World Championships in Athletics in 2007 and the 2007 World Championships in Athletics.

Tarmo Jallai currently resides in his hometown of Tartu.
