= Egle Uljas =

Estonian sprinter

Personal information
- Nationality: Estonian
- Born: 18 December 1984 (age 41) Tallinn, then part of Estonian SSR, Soviet Union

Sport
- Sport: Sprinting
- Event: 400 metres

Achievements and titles
- Personal bests: 100 m: 12.25 (2003); 200 m: 24.37 (2008); 400 m: 51.91 NR (2004); 800 m: 2:02.92 (2005)

Egle Uljas (born 18 December 1984) is a retired Estonian sprinter. She competed in the women's 400 metres at the 2004 Summer Olympics.

Egle was also a talented concert pianist, and played for the Nebraska-Lincoln Symphony Orchestra. She ran for the Nebraska Cornhuskers track and field team, but quit in 2006 after not being satisfied with the coaches or the music program. Egle led the 800 m at the 2005 NCAA Division I Outdoor Track and Field Championships until the final 100 m, but fell 30 m from the finish and was disqualified. She later ran for the Baylor Bears track and field team.
