= Ille Kukk =

Estonian athletics competitor

Ille Kukk (born 6 May 1957) is an Estonian athletics competitor.

She was born in Tartu. In 1981 she graduated from the University of Tartu's Institute of Physical Education.

She began athletics training in 1970, coached by Linda Ojastu. Since 1975 she focused on middle-distance running, coached by Alfred Pisuke, later Endel Pärn and Andres Nirk. She is multiple-times Estonian champion in different running disciplines. 1978–1996 she was a member of Estonian national running team.

Since 1991 she is working as a coach at the Tartu Kalev's athletics school.
