= Tallinn Indoor Meeting =

International athletics competition held in Tallinn

Tallinn Indoor Meeting is an annual athletics meeting held at the Lasnamäe Indoor Arena in Tallinn, Estonia. The event is part of the World Athletics Combined Events Tour (Silver Level) from 2022 and previously one of the EA Indoor Permit Meetings.

== World records ==
World records set at the Tallinn Indoor Meeting
Year	Event	Record	Athlete	Nationality
2011	Heptathlon	6568	Ashton Eaton	United States

== Winners ==
Winners at the Tallinn Indoor Meeting
Year	Men	Points	Women	Points	Ref.
2010	Mikk Pahapill (EST)	6156	Grit Šadeiko (EST)	4166	
2011	Ashton Eaton (USA)	6568 (WR)	Grit Šadeiko (EST)	4422	
2012	Dominik Distelberger (AUT)	5803	Laura Ikauniece (LAT)	4346	
2013	Mikk Pahapill (EST)	6024	Laura Ikauniece (LAT)	4296	
2014	Carlos Chinin (BRA)	5951 (NR, =AR)	Aleksandra Butvina (RUS)	4549	
2015	Kai Kazmirek (GER)	6049	Agnieszka Borowska (POL)	4368	
2016	Kai Kazmirek (GER)	6111	Claudia Rath (GER)	4688	
2017	Kristjan Rosenberg (EST)	5986	Alina Shukh (UKR)	4542	
2018	Kai Kazmirek (GER)	5903	Alina Shukh (UKR)	4375	
2019	Janek Õiglane (EST)	6085	Laura Ikauniece (LAT)	4454	
2020	Jorge Ureña (ESP)	6091	Alina Shukh (UKR)	4518	
2021	Risto Lillemets (EST)	6089	Adrianna Sulek (POL)	4442	
2022	Hans-Christian Hausenberg (EST)	6143	Adrianna Sulek (POL)	4598	
2023	Sander Skotheim (NOR)	6255 (NR)	Adrianna Sulek (POL)	4702	
2024	Sander Skotheim (NOR)	6281	Yuliya Loban (UKR)	4537	
2025	Sander Skotheim (NOR)	6484	Saga Vanninen (FIN)	4843	
2026	Rasmus Roosleht (EST)	6045	Szabina Szucs (HUN)	4494	
