= Elju Kubi =

Estonian athletics competitor

Elju Kubi (until 1975 Gunjakova; born 25 March 1951) is an Estonian athletics competitor.

She was born in Laimjala, Saare County.

She started sporting at gymnasium, coached by Manfred Tõnisson. Later her coach was Aleksander Lohk. She focused on discus throw and shot put. She is multiple-times Estonian champion in discus throw and shot put.

Personal best:

- discus throw: 65.00
- shot put: 15.70 (1987)
