= Kati Ojaloo =

Estonian hammer thrower

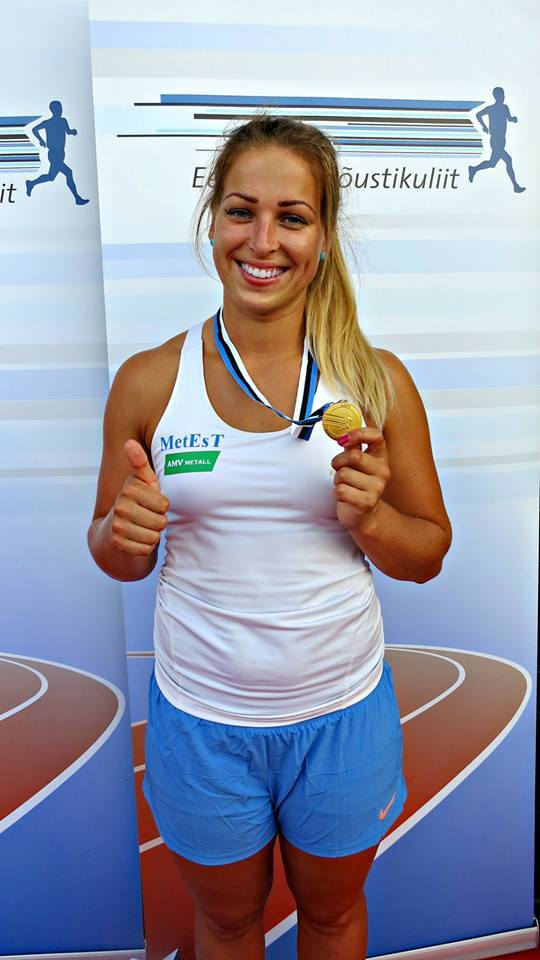

Personal information
- Nationality: Estonian
- Born: January 31, 1990 (age 36) Estonia

Sport
- Country: Estonia
- Sport: Track and field
- Event: Hammer throw
- Club: KJS Sakala
- Turned pro: 2009-

Achievements and titles
- Personal best: 71.50 in outdoor
Medal record
Women's athletics
Representing Estonia
Baltic Championships
Gold medal – first place	2021 Ogre	Hammer throw

Kati Ojaloo (born 31 January 1990) is an Estonian hammer thrower. She participated at the 2014 European Athletics Championships.

Her personal best in the event is 71.50 metres set in Pori, Finland in August 2020, it is also the Estonian national record.

She lives in Finland and is in a relationship with Finnish hammer thrower Tuomas Seppänen. She earned the right to compete in Finnish Championship events since February 2019.

== Competition record ==
Year	Competition	Venue	Position	Notes
Representing Estonia
2014	European Championships	Zürich, Switzerland	22nd (q)	59.63 m
2015	Universiade	Gwangju, South Korea	6th	64.93 m
