= Õilme Võro =

Estonian athlete

Personal information
- Nationality: Estonian
- Born: 2 January 1996 (age 30) Võru, Estonia

Sport
- Sport: Athletics
- Events: 60m, 100m

Õilme Võro (born 2 January 1996) is an Estonian track and field athlete who competes as a sprinter. She is a multiple time national champion, as well as being the national record holder over 60 metres.

== Career ==
Vōro set a new personal best of 7.32 at the Estonian Indoor championships in February. On 3 March 2023, Vōro set a new 60m personal best and national record 7.31 to qualify for the semi-finals at the 2023 European Athletics Indoor Championships in Istanbul, Turkey. In the semi-finals Vōro ran 7.29 to equal the national record of Ksenija Balta.

In January 2024, she ran 7.34 seconds for the 60 metres in Tampere. She and sprint hurdler Diana Suumann were both selected for the 2024 World Athletics Indoor Championships in Glasgow, Scotland, the first time Estonia had been represented at a global championships by two female sprinters at the same time, with both being coached by the experienced Tiina Torop. She reached the semi-finals of the championships, with a new national record time of 7.24 seconds. She was named in the Estonian team for the 4 x 100 metres relay team for the 2024 2024 World Athletics Relays in Nassau, Bahamas, but was ruled out of the championships with injury. She won the Motonet GP in Joensuu, Finland in July 2021 with a wind assisted run of 11.48 seconds (+2.1 m/s). Competing in Kärdla in August 2024, she won the women's 100 metres race in 11.33 seconds, two hundredths of a second faster than the Estonian record held by Ksenija Balta since 2014. However, Võro was denied by a tailwind of +2.1 m/s from claiming the national record.

== Personal life ==
She was named after her grandmother. Alongside her athletics career she worked as a make-up artist.
