= Kreete Verlin =

Estonian athlete (born 1997)

Personal information
- Born: 14 February 1997 (age 29) Tallinn, Estonia

Sport
- Sport: Athletics
- Event: Hurdles

Achievements and titles
- Personal bests: 60mH: 7.96 (Madrid, 2026) NR; 100mH: 13.11 (Tartu, 2025)

Kreete Verlin (born 14 February 1997) is an Estonian hurdler. She is a multiple-time national champion and was a semi-finalist over 60 metres hurdles at the 2025 World Athletics Indoor Championships.

== Biography ==
From Tallinn, Verlin trains under Maris Mägi. She won the Estonian Athletics Championships for the first time over 100 metres hurdles in August 2020. She won the Estonian Indoor Athletics Championships for the first time over 60 metres hurdles in February 2022. The following month, she competed for Estonia at the 2022 World Athletics Indoor Championships in Belgrade, without advancing to the semi-finals.

She ran as part of the Estonian 4 × 100 m relay team at the 2024 World Relays Championships in Nassau, Bahamas in May 2024, as well as the following month at the 2024 European Athletics Championships in Rome.

In January 2025, she lowered the Estonian national record for the 60 metres hurdles to 8.06 seconds whilst competing in Luxembourg. In March 2025, she competed at the 2025 European Athletics Indoor Championships in Apeldoorn, Netherlands and was a semi-finalist over 60 metres hurdles at the 2025 World Athletics Indoor Championships in Nanjing, China.

Verlin set a new 100m hurdles personal best in Tartu on 17 June 2025 of 13.11 seconds. Later that month, she competed for Estonia in the 2025 European Athletics Team Championships Second Division in Maribor, Slovenia, in the 100 metres hurdles. Running alongside Miia Ott, Anna Maria Millend and Ann Marii Kivikas to set an Estonian record of 43.98 in the 4 x 100 metres race at the championships.

On January 24, 2026, she improved her Estonian record by a hundredth of a second, bringing it to 8.05. In February 2026, she set new personal bests for the 60 metres hurdles competing on the World Athletics Indoor Tour, recording 8.03 in Ostrava on the 3 February, before competing in Madrid, Spain, on 6 February, running 7.97 and then 7.96 seconds in consecutive races. She won the 60 metres hurdles at the Estonian Indoor Championships in February 2026, running 7.99 seconds in Tallinn. In March 2026, she ran in the 60 metres hurdles at the 2026 World Athletics Indoor Championships in Toruń, Poland, reaching the semi-finals.
