= Viola Hambidge =

Estonian athlete (born 2006)

Personal information
- Born: 15 July 2006 (age 20)

Sport
- Sport: Athletics
- Events: Hurdles, Sprint, Middle-distance running, Heptathlon
Medal record
Women's athletics
Representing Estonia
European U20 Championships
Bronze medal – third place	2025 Tampere	400 m hurdles
European Youth Olympic Festival
Silver medal – second place	2022 Banská Bystrica	Heptathlon

Viola Hambidge (born 15 July 2006) is an Estonian multi-event athlete. She has won the Estonian Athletics Championships over 400 metres indoors and outdoors, as well as in the 400 metres hurdles outdoors and 800 metres indoors.

== Biography ==
From Pärnu, and a member of Pärnu Spordiklubi Altius, Hambidge initially competed as a middle-distance runner, and broke the Estonian under-18 record over 800 metres, with a time of 2:14.53. She also broke the Estonian under-16 best in the 1500m steeplechase, with a time of 5:18.00. She won titles at the 2022 U18 Baltic Indoor Championships in both the 800 metres and 1500 metres.

Competing in multi-events, she won the team pentathlon at the 2022 Baltic Championships. Hambidge won the silver medal in the heptathlon behind Switzerland's Lucia Acklin at the 2022 European Youth Summer Olympic Festival in Banská Bystrica, Slovakia. Hambidge competed for Estonia at the 2023 European Athletics Team Championships in Silesia, Poland. Alongside Mia Mireia Uusorg, Pia Lauren Matsalu, and Miia Ott, she was part of the Estonian Swedish medley relay team which twice broke the Estonian age-group record at the 2023 Youth Olympic Festival in Maribor, placing fourth overall in the final.

Hambidge won the 400 metres at the 2024 Estonian Athletics Championships in 54.08 seconds in Tallinn in June 2024, also winning the national 400 metres hurdles title at the same championships in 58.52 seconds. Hambidge was a semi-finalist in the 400 metres hurdles at the 2024 World Athletics U20 Championships in Lima, Peru.

Hambidge competed in the 400 metres hurdles at the 2025 European Athletics U20 Championships in Tampere, Finland, and qualified fastest for the final before winning the bronze medal in a national U20 record of 56.71 in the final. Hambidge broke the Estonian U20 and U23 records twice in the competition. The following month, Hambidge retained her national 400 metres title at the 2025 Estonian Athletics Championships in August.

Hambidge won the 400 metres at the Estonian Indoor Championships in February 2026, running 54.99 seconds in Tallinn. She also won the 800 metres at the championships, running 2:11.41. Competing at the 2026 European Athletics Championships in Birmingham, England, she did not advance to the semi-finals in the 400 metres hurdles.
