= Gerli Israel =

Estonian footballer

Personal information
- Date of birth: 7 February 1995 (age 31)
- Place of birth: Tallinn, Estonia
- Position: Defender

International career^{‡}
Years	Team	Apps	(Gls)
2019–	Estonia	9	(0)
- ‡ National team caps and goals as of 18:18, 11 April 2021 (UTC)

Gerli Israel (born 7 February 1995) is an Estonian footballer who plays as a defender for the Estonia national team.

== International career ==
Israel made her debut for the Estonia national team on 27 February 2019 as a substitute for Mari-Liis Lillemäe against Malta.
