= Liina Tšernov =

Estonian athletics competitor

Liina Tšernov (born 28 December 1987) is an Estonian athletics competitor.

She was born in Saku, Harju County. She studied at the University of Tartu's Institute of Physical Education.

She began her athletics career in 2010, coached by Tiiu Zirnask. Later her coaches were Valter Espe and Endel Pärna. She won bronze medal at 2014 European Athletics Team Championships in 800 m and 1500 m. She is multiple-times Estonian champion in different running disciplines. 2015–2019 she was a member of Estonian national athletics team.

Personal best:

- 800 m: 2.03,96 (2016)
- 3000 m: 9.01,45 (2017)
- 5000 m: 16.19,32 (2019)
