= Kristo Galeta =

Estonian shot putter

Personal information
- Nationality: Estonian
- Born: 9 April 1983 (age 43) Viljandi, then part of Estonian SSR, Soviet Union
- Height: 1.90 m (6 ft 3 in)
- Weight: 122 kg (269 lb)

Achievements and titles
- World finals: 2019
- Personal best(s): Shot put: 20.76 m Discus: 52.67 m Javelin: 78.05 m

Kristo Galeta (born 9 April 1983) is an Estonian shot putter.

On 21 July 2019, he realized the new Estonian record in shot put with 20.76 metres (68.1 ft), entry standard for 2019 World Championships.
