= Karl Erik Nazarov =

Estonian sprinter

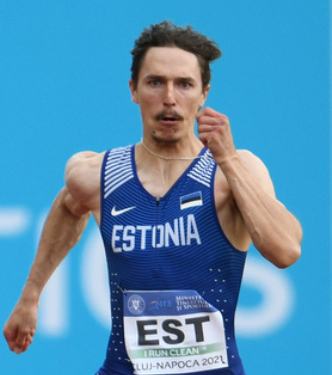

Personal information
- Born: 17 March 1999 (age 26)

Sport
- Sport: Athletics
- Event(s): 60 m, 100 m
- Coached by: Heiko Väät (first); Mikkel Larsen (2021–)

Karl Erik Nazarov (born Laanet, 17 March 1999) is an Estonian sprinter. Focusing on 400 metres hurdles initially, he switched to sprints in 2021. His biggest success to date is the fourth place in the 60 metres at the 2022 World Indoor Championships.

His uncle is Andrei Nazarov, a former decathlete.

== International competitions ==
Year	Competition	Venue	Position	Event	Notes
Representing Estonia
2018	World U20 Championships	Tampere, Finland	29th (h)	400 m hurdles	52.80
2019	European U23 Championships	Gävle, Sweden	16th (h)	400 m hurdles	52.14
2021	European Indoor Championships	Toruń, Poland	7th	60 m	6.67
2021	Baltic States Championships	Ogre, Latvia	1st	100 m	10.47
2021	Baltic States Championships	Ogre, Latvia	1st	4 × 100 m relay	39.92
2022	World Indoor Championships	Belgrade, Serbia	4th	60 m	6.58
2022	European Championships	Munich, Germany	13th (h)	100 m	10.39
2023	European Indoor Championships	Istanbul, Turkey	11th (sf)	60 m	6.63
2024	European Championships	Rome, Italy	19th (h)	100 m	10.49
2025	European Indoor Championships	Apeldoorn, Netherlands	16th (sf)	60 m	6.65

== Personal bests ==
Outdoor

- 100 metres – 10.18 (+1.4 m/s, Jõhvi 2023)
- 200 metres – 20.94 (-1.0 m/s, Chorzów 2023)
- 400 metres hurdles – 51.32 (Jyväskylä 2020)

Indoor

- 60 metres – 6.55 (Belgrade 2022) NR
- 200 metres – 21.63 (Tallinn 2020)
