= Tiidrek Nurme =

Estonian athletics competitor

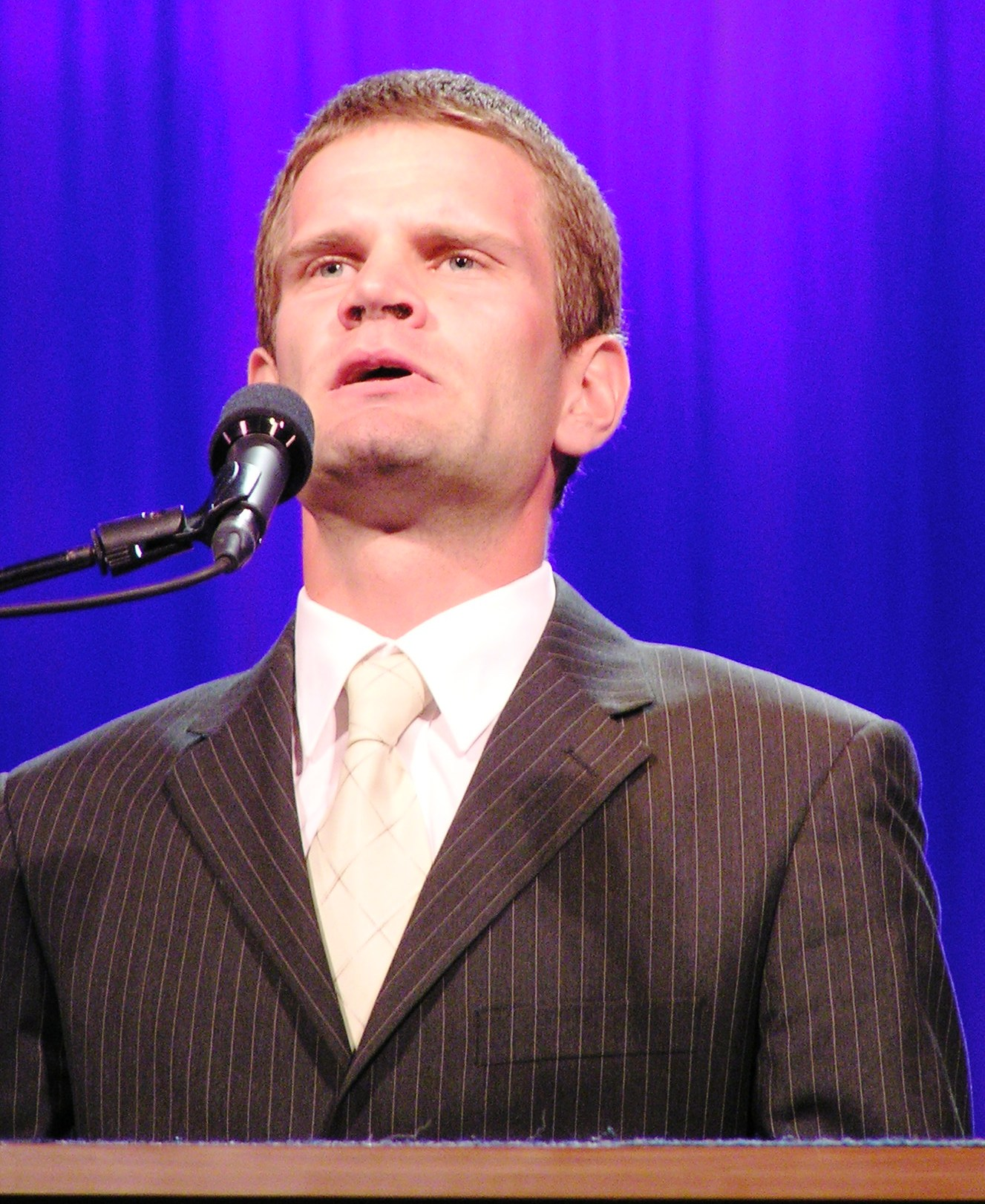

Personal information
- Full name: Tiidrek Nurme
- Born: 18 November 1985 (age 40) Kuressaare, then part of Estonian SSR, Soviet Union
- Height: 1.84 m (6 ft 0 in)
- Weight: 70 kg (154 lb)

Sport
- Country: Estonia
- Sport: Athletics
- Events: 1500 m, 3000 m, 5000 m, marathon

Achievements and titles
- Personal best: Marathon: 2:10:02

Tiidrek Nurme (born 18 November 1985) is an Estonian long and middle-distance runner, the current national record holder of the 1500 metres and 3000 metres.

Nurme is one of only five men in the history of the Olympic Games to have qualified for and competed in the 1,500 metres (2008) and the marathon (2016) in separate Olympics during their career. The other four are Rod Dixon of New Zealand (1972, 1984), Luis Feiteira of Portugal (1996, 2012), Bayron Piedra of Ecuador (2008, 2016) and Jacques Boxberger of France (1968, 1984).

At the Beijing 2008 Summer Olympics Nurme placed 27th among 50 runners (26th after a Moroccan got banned) in 1500m. In Beijing he set a national record with a time of 3:38.59, running at 1100m as a pacemaker.

At the Rio 2016 Summer Olympics, Nurme was part of the Olympic record-setting size marathon field when 155 men from 80 countries competed in the race where he placed 63rd overall.

At the Tokyo 2020 Summer Olympics Nurme placed 27th among 106 runners (26th after a Moroccan got banned due to the doping violation). Tokyo 2020 marathon was the deepest field in OG history, all 106 men had to be faster than the time of 2:11:30 to qualify.

== Major competition record ==
Year	Competition	Venue	Position	Event	Result
Representing Estonia
2005	World Cross Country Championships	Saint-Étienne/Saint-Galmier, France	129th	Short race (4.196 km)	13:47
2007	European U23 Championships	Debrecen, Hungary	5th	5000 m	13:57.51
2007	Universiade	Bangkok, Thailand	10th	5000 m	14:23.50
2008	Olympic Games	Beijing, China	26th (h)	1500 m	3:38.59 NR
2009	European Indoor Championships	Turin, Italy	16th (h)	3000 m	8:08.81
2009	World Championships	Berlin, Germany	28th (h)	1500 m	3:43.73
2010	European Championships	Barcelona, Spain	16th (h)	5000 m	13:49.19
2011	Universiade	Shenzhen, China	4th	5000 m	14:05.03
2012	European Championships	Helsinki, Finland	16th	5000 m	13:51.29
2013	Universiade	Kazan, Russia	8th	5000 m	14:08.02
2014	European Championships	Zürich, Switzerland	10th	5000 m	14:13.89
2016	Olympic Games	Rio de Janeiro, Brazil	63rd	Marathon	2:20:01
2017	World Championships	London, United Kingdom	40th	Marathon	2:20:41
2018	European Championships	Berlin, Germany	9th	Marathon	2:15:16
2019	World Championships	Doha, Qatar	26th	Marathon	2:17:38
2020	World Half Marathon Championships	Gdynia, Poland	41st	Half Marathon	1:02:20
2021	Olympic Games	Sapporo, Japan	26th	Marathon	2:16:16
2022	European Championships	Munich, Germany	11th	Marathon	2:12:46
2023	World Championships	Budapest, Hungary	30th	Marathon	2:15:42
2023	World Running Championships	Riga, Latvia	30th	5 km	14:06
2025	World Championships	Tokyo, Japan	51st	Marathon	2:21:58
2025	European Running Championships	Brussels-Leuven, Belgium	12th	Marathon	2:14:02
2026	European Championships	Birmingham, United Kingdom	31st	Marathon	2:18:18

== Personal bests ==
=== Outdoor ===
Distance	Mark	Date	Location	Notes
800 m	1:52.25	3 July 2006	Rakvere	
1500 m	3:38.59	15 August 2008	Beijing	National record
Mile	3:59.74	9 August 2011	Viljandi	National record
2000 m	5:06.02	16 July 2008	Joensuu	National record
3000 m	7:48.24	11 July 2014	Dublin	National record
5000 m	13:31.87	16 April 2010	Walnut	
10000 m	28:37.85	5 June 2021	Birmingham	
Half marathon	1:02:20	17 October 2020	Gdynia	National record
Marathon	2:10:02	23 February 2020	Sevilla	

=== Indoor ===
Distance	Mark	Date	Location	Notes
1500 m	3:46.10	19 February 2011	Tallinn	
2000 m	5:18.50	20 February 2008	Tartu	
3000 m	7:55.37	10 February 2010	Stockholm	National record
5000 m	14:18.38	1 September 2020	Tartu	
