= Jekaterina Patjuk =

Estonian steeplechase runner

Personal information
- Nationality: Estonian
- Born: 6 April 1983 (age 43) Estonia

Sport
- Country: Estonia
- Sport: Athletics
- Event: Steeplechase runner

Achievements and titles
- Personal best: 3000 m steeplechase: 9:50.15 (2014)

Jekaterina Patjuk (born 6 April 1983) is an Estonian athlete who competed mainly in the 3000 metres steeplechase.

She is the current Estonian record holder on 3000 metres steeplechase.

== Biography ==
She won at least eight times national championships outdoor (two on 1500 metres and six on 5000 metres), and at least (till 2006) five times indoor (two in 1500 m. and three on 3000 metres)

In 2020, she competed in the women's race at the 2020 World Athletics Half Marathon Championships held in Gdynia, Poland.

== See also ==
- Estonian records in athletics
