= Ksenija Balta =

Estonian athletics competitor

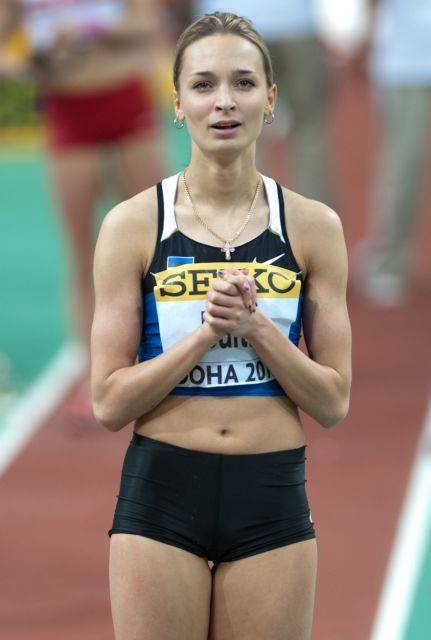
- Balta at the 2010 IAAF World Indoor Championships

Personal information
- Full name: Ksenija Balta
- Born: 1 November 1986 (age 39) Minsk, Byelorussian SSR, USSR
- Height: 1.68 m (5 ft 6 in)
- Weight: 53 kg (117 lb)

Sport
- Country: Estonia
- Sport: Track and field
- Events: Long jump, sprint, heptathlon
- Club: Tallinna SS Kalev
- Coached by: Andrei Nazarov

Achievements and titles
- Personal bests: Long jump: 6.87 m (NR); Heptathlon: 6,180
Medal record
Representing Estonia
Women's Athletics
European Indoor Championships
Gold medal – first place	2009 Turin	Long jump
European Junior Championships
Bronze medal – third place	2005 Kaunas	Heptathlon

Ksenija Balta (born 1 November 1986) is an Estonian long jumper, sprinter and heptathlete. She won the long jump at the 2009 European Indoor Championships in Athletics.

== Career ==
Balta finished 14th in pentathlon at the 2005 European Indoor Championships and won the bronze medal in heptathlon at the 2005 European Junior Championships. She also competed in long jump and 100 metres at the 2006 European Championships and in long jump at the 2008 Summer Olympics. She won the gold medal at the 2009 European Indoor Championships with a 6.87 meter jump in the fourth round.

Balta's personal best score in heptathlon is 6,180 points, achieved in July 2006 in Arles; in long jump 6.87 meters, achieved in 2009 in Turin (indoor) and in 2010 in Tallinn (outdoor); in 100 metres 11.47, achieved in 2006 in Gothenburg; and in 200 metres 23.05 in 2006 in Arles. She holds national outdoor records in 100 metres, 200 metres and long jump. She also holds indoor national records in 50 metres, 60 m hurdles and long jump.

Her coach is Andrei Nazarov.

== Major competition record ==
Year	Competition	Venue	Position	Event	Result
Representing Estonia
2005	European Indoor Championships	Madrid, Spain	14th	Pentathlon	3,711
2005	European Junior Championships	Kaunas, Lithuania	3rd	Heptathlon	5,747
2006	European Championships	Gothenburg, Sweden	17th (q)	100 m	11.47
2006	European Championships	Gothenburg, Sweden	23rd (q)	Long jump	6.03 m
2008	Olympic Games	Beijing, China	27th (q)	Long jump	6.38 m
2008	World Athletics Final	Stuttgart, Germany	2nd	Long jump	6.65 m
2009	European Indoor Championships	Turin, Italy	1st	Long jump	6.87 m
2009	World Championships	Berlin, Germany	8th	Long jump	6.62 m
2009	World Athletics Final	Thessaloniki, Greece	5th	Long jump	6.58 m
2010	World Indoor Championships	Doha, Qatar	4th	Long jump	6.63 m
2010	European Championships	Barcelona, Spain	–	200 m	DSQ
2010	European Championships	Barcelona, Spain	16th (q)	Long jump	6.53 m
2016	World Indoor Championships	Portland, United States	7th	Long jump	6.60 m
2016	European Championships	Amsterdam, Netherlands	4th	Long jump	6.65 m
2016	Olympic Games	Rio de Janeiro, Brazil	6th	Long jump	6.79 m
2017	European Indoor Championships	Belgrade, Serbia	5th	Long jump	6.79 m
2017	World Championships	London, United Kingdom	25th (q)	Long jump	6.15 m
2018	World Indoor Championships	Birmingham, United Kingdom	8th	Long jump	6.57 m
2018	European Championships	Berlin, Germany	6th	Long jump	6.49 m
2021	Olympic Games	Tokyo, Japan	–	Long jump	NM

Awards
Preceded by Kaia Kanepi; Epp Mäe	Estonian Female Athlete of the Year; 2009; 2016	Succeeded by Kristina Šmigun-Vähi; Julia Beljajeva
