= List of Estonian Athletics Championships winners =

The Estonian Athletics Championships is an annual track and field competition which serves as the national championship for Estonia. It is organised by the Estonian Athletic Association, Estonia's national governing body for the sport of athletics. The winner of each event at the championships is declared the national champion for that year. The competition was first held in 1917 and was held as a sub-national competition during the time that the Soviet Athletics Championships existed, before becoming the top level national competition for Estonians upon independence in 1991.

== Men ==
=== 100 metres ===
- 1917*: Johannes Villemson
- 1918*: Johannes Villemson
- 1919*: Johannes Villemson
- 1920: Reinhold Saulmann
- 1921: Konstantin Pereversin
- 1922: Konstantin Pereversin
- 1923: Reinhold Kesküll
- 1924: Konstantin Pereversin
- 1925: Reinhold Kesküll
- 1926: Elmar Rähn
- 1927: Edgar Labent
- 1928: Edgar Labent
- 1929: Edgar Labent
- 1930: Valter Korol
- 1931: Valter Rattus
- 1932: Nikolai Küttis
- 1933: Rudolf Tomson
- 1934: Rudolf Tomson
- 1935: Ruudi Toomsalu
- 1936: Ruudi Toomsalu
- 1937: Ruudi Toomsalu
- 1938: Ruudi Toomsalu
- 1939: Georg Vuht
- 1940: Harry Aumere
- 1941: –
- 1942: Konstantin Ivanov
- 1943: Vadim Palm
- 1944: Heino Koik
- 1945: Konstantin Ivanov
- 1946: Heldur Tüüts
- 1947: Georg Gilde
- 1948: Georg Gilde
- 1949: Endel Küllik
- 1950: Georg Gilde
- 1951: Uno Liiv
- 1952: Georg Gilde
- 1953: Uno Liiv
- 1954: Heino Heinlo
- 1955: Uno Kiiroja
- 1956: Uno Kiiroja
- 1957: Heino Heinlo
- 1958: Toomas Kitsing
- 1959: Uno Kiiroja
- 1960: Uno Kiiroja
- 1961: Eino Ojastu
- 1962: Toomas Kitsing
- 1963: Toomas Kitsing
- 1964: Jüri Liigand
- 1965: Jüri Liigand
- 1966: Jüri Liigand
- 1967: Boris Nugis and Eduard Püve
- 1968: Jüri Liigand
- 1969: Viktor Kirilenko
- 1970: Avo Oja
- 1971: Kalju Jurkatamm
- 1972: Jüri Liigand
- 1973: Paul Nagel
- 1974: Andres Luka
- 1975: Gennadi Organov
- 1976: Gennadi Organov
- 1977: Gennadi Organov
- 1978: Gennadi Organov
- 1979: Jevgeni Jessin
- 1980: Jevgeni Jessin
- 1981: Mihhail Urjadnikov
- 1982: Mihhail Urjadnikov
- 1983: Mihhail Urjadnikov
- 1984: Mihhail Urjadnikov
- 1985: Andrus Möll
- 1986: Andrus Möll
- 1987: Andrus Möll
- 1988: Enn Lilienthal
- 1989: Enn Lilienthal
- 1990: Andrei Morozov
- 1991: Andrei Morozov
- 1992: Andrei Morozov
- 1993: Andrei Morozov
- 1994: Andrei Morozov
- 1995: Andrei Morozov
- 1996: Rainis Jaansoo
- 1997: Rainis Jaansoo
- 1998: Tanel Soosaar
- 1999: Erki Nool
- 2000: Maidu Laht
- 2001: Garol Pärn
- 2002: Argo Golberg
- 2003: Argo Golberg
- 2004: Allar Aasma
- 2005: Henri Sool
- 2006: Marek Niit
- 2007: Henri Sool
- 2008: Marek Niit
- 2009: Richard Pulst
- 2010: Richard Pulst
- 2011: Mart Muru
- 2012: Marek Niit
- 2013: Timo Tiismaa
- 2014: Rait Veesalu
- 2015: Kaspar Mesila
- 2016: Timo Tiismaa
- 2017: Marek Niit
- 2018: Richard Pulst
- 2019: Karl Erik Nazarov
- 2020: Henri Sai
- 2021: Karl Erik Nazarov
- 2022: Karl Erik Nazarov

=== 200 metres ===
- 1918*: Johannes Villemson
- 1919*: Johannes Villemson
- 1920: Reinhold Saulmann
- 1921: Konstantin Pereversin
- 1922: Konstantin Pereversin
- 1923: Konstantin Pereversin
- 1924: Konstantin Pereversin
- 1925: Reinhold Kesküll
- 1926: Elmar Rähn
- 1927: Julius Tiisfeldt
- 1928: Edgar Labent
- 1929: Edgar Labent
- 1930: Valter Korol
- 1931: Valter Rattus
- 1932: Nikolai Küttis
- 1933: Rudolf Tomson
- 1934: Rudolf Tomson
- 1935: Ruudi Toomsalu
- 1936: Ruudi Toomsalu
- 1937: Ruudi Toomsalu
- 1938: Valter Kalam
- 1939: Valter Kalam
- 1940: Eduard Nurk
- 1941: –
- 1942: Konstantin Ivanov
- 1943: Konstantin Ivanov
- 1944: Heino Koik
- 1945: Aleksander Sirel
- 1946: Georg Gilde
- 1947: Georg Gilde
- 1948: Georg Gilde
- 1949: Endel Küllik
- 1950: Georg Gilde
- 1951: Georg Gilde
- 1952: Georg Gilde
- 1953: Ülo Laaspere
- 1954: Heino Heinlo
- 1955: Ursel Teedemaa
- 1956: Ülo Laaspere
- 1957: Heino Heinlo
- 1958: Toomas Kitsing
- 1959: Uno Kiiroja
- 1960: Eino Ojastu
- 1961: Kalju Jurkatamm
- 1962: Enno Akkel
- 1963: Toomas Kitsing
- 1964: Kalju Jurkatamm
- 1965: Kalju Kikamägi
- 1966: Kalju Jurkatamm
- 1967: Boris Nugis
- 1968: Kalju Kikamägi
- 1969: Viktor Kirilenko
- 1970: Avo Oja
- 1971: Ennu Laasner
- 1972: Rein Tõru
- 1973: Andres Luka
- 1974: Vladimir Ivaštšenko
- 1975: Gennadi Organov
- 1976: Ramon Lindal
- 1977: Jevgeni Jessin
- 1978: Gennadi Organov
- 1979: Gennadi Organov
- 1980: Ramon Lindal
- 1981: Mihhail Urjadnikov
- 1982: Ramon Lindal
- 1983: Mihhail Urjadnikov
- 1984: Mihhail Urjadnikov
- 1985: Andrus Möll
- 1986: Andrus Möll
- 1987: Andrus Möll
- 1988: Enn Lilienthal
- 1989: Enn Lilienthal
- 1990: Enn Lilienthal
- 1991: Andrei Morozov
- 1992: Rainis Jaansoo
- 1993: Andrei Morozov
- 1994: Andrus Hämelane
- 1995: Andrus Hämelane
- 1996: Rainis Jaansoo
- 1997: Rainis Jaansoo
- 1998: Urmet Uusorg
- 1999: Mait Lind
- 2000: Maidu Laht
- 2001: Martin Vihmann
- 2002: Martin Vihmann
- 2003: Henri Sool
- 2004: Martin Vihmann
- 2005: Martin Vihmann
- 2006: Marek Niit
- 2007: Taavi Liiv
- 2008: Henri Sool
- 2009: Marek Niit
- 2010: Richard Pulst
- 2011: Marek Niit
- 2012: Marek Niit
- 2013: Marek Niit
- 2014: Marek Niit
- 2015: Markus Ellisaar
- 2016: Timo Tiismaa
- 2017: Marek Niit
- 2018: Tony Nõu
- 2019: Ken-Mark Minkovski
- 2020: Henri Sai
- 2021: Henri Sai
- 2022: Karl Erik Nazarov

=== 400 metres ===
- 1991: Aivar Ojastu
- 1992: Aivar Ojastu
- 1993: Rainis Jaansoo
- 1994: Rainis Jaansoo
- 1995: Rainis Jaansoo
- 1996: Urmet Uusorg
- 1997: Urmet Uusorg
- 1998: Urmet Uusorg
- 1999: Urmet Uusorg
- 2000: Urmet Uusorg
- 2001: Urmet Uusorg
- 2002: Urmet Uusorg
- 2003: Lauri Birkan
- 2004: Martin Vihmann
- 2005: Martin Vihmann
- 2006: Henri Sool

=== 800 metres ===
- 1991: Raivo Raspel
- 1992: Raivo Raspel
- 1993: Raivo Raspel
- 1994: Oleg Holdai
- 1995: Marko Metsala
- 1996: Urmet Uusorg
- 1997: Urmet Uusorg
- 1998: Oleg Holdai
- 1999: Urmet Uusorg
- 2000: Igor Holdai
- 2001: Urmet Uusorg
- 2002: Urmet Uusorg
- 2003: Sergo Treufeld
- 2004: Roman Fosti
- 2005: Priit Lehismets
- 2006: Priit Põldmaa

=== 1500 metres ===
- 1991: Andry Prodel
- 1992: Veljo Lamp
- 1993: Arvi Uba
- 1994: Indrek Mänd
- 1995: Marko Metsala
- 1996: Heiki Sarapuu
- 1997: Oleg Holdai
- 1998: Marko Metsala
- 1999: Oleg Holdai
- 2000: Margus Pirksaar
- 2001: Rainis Mitt
- 2002: Roman Fosti
- 2003: Rainis Mitt
- 2004: Nikolai Vedehin
- 2005: Tiidrek Nurme
- 2006: Tiidrek Nurme

=== 5000 metres ===
- 1917*: Heinrich Paal
- 1918*: Jüri Lossman
- 1919*: Jüri Lossman
- 1920: Jüri Lossman
- 1921: Hugo Osterode
- 1922: Aleksander Erlich
- 1923: Karl Laurson
- 1924: Julius Tiisfeldt
- 1925: Karl Laurson
- 1926: Karl Laurson
- 1927: Karl Laurson
- 1928: Felix Beldsinsky
- 1929: Felix Beldsinsky
- 1930: Martin Prost
- 1931: Felix Beldsinsky
- 1932: Eduard Prööm
- 1933: Eduard Prööm
- 1934: Eduard Prööm
- 1935: Eduard Prööm
- 1936: Eduard Prööm
- 1937: Eduard Prööm
- 1938: Eduard Prööm
- 1939: Eduard Prööm
- 1940: Eduard Prööm
- 1941: –
- 1942: Eduard Prööm
- 1943: Richard Lulla
- 1944: Ilmar Piliste
- 1945: Nikolai Aleksejev
- 1946: Nikolai Aleksejev
- 1947: Nikolai Aleksejev
- 1948: Ilmar Reidla
- 1949: Mihail Velsvebel
- 1950: Mihail Velsvebel
- 1951: Erich Veetõusme
- 1952: Vladimir Kuts
- 1953: Viktor Puusepp
- 1954: Hubert Pärnakivi
- 1955: Hubert Pärnakivi
- 1956: Lembit Virkus
- 1957: Tõnu Soom
- 1958: Tõnu Soom
- 1959: Lembit Virkus
- 1960: Lembit Virkus
- 1961: Hubert Pärnakivi
- 1962: Hubert Pärnakivi
- 1963: Ants Nurmekivi
- 1964: Mart Vilt
- 1965: Mart Vilt
- 1966: Maido Keskküla
- 1967: Erik Maasik
- 1968: Mart Vilt
- 1969: Ants Nurmekivi
- 1970: Aleksander Tšernov
- 1971: Ants Nurmekivi
- 1972: Erik Maasik
- 1973: Vladimir Raudsepp
- 1974: Enn Sellik
- 1975: Erik Maasik
- 1976: Vladimir Raudsepp
- 1977: Lev Zagžetskas
- 1978: Sergei Ustintsev
- 1979: Toomas Turb
- 1980: Toomas Turb
- 1981: Rein Valdmaa
- 1982: Rein Valdmaa
- 1983: Enn Sellik
- 1984: Toomas Turb
- 1985: Toomas Turb
- 1986: Ain Mõnjam
- 1987: Toomas Turb
- 1988: Rein Valdmaa
- 1989: Heiki Sarapuu
- 1990: Margus Kirt
- 1991: Vjatšeslav Košelev
- 1992: Arvi Uba
- 1993: Henno Haava
- 1994: Pavel Loskutov
- 1995: Pavel Loskutov
- 1996: Heiki Sarapuu
- 1997: Heiki Sarapuu
- 1998: Pavel Loskutov
- 1999: Toomas Tarm
- 2000: Margus Pirksaar
- 2001: Risto Ütsmüts
- 2002: Margus Pirksaar
- 2003: Pavel Loskutov
- 2004: Aleksei Saveljev
- 2005: Tiidrek Nurme
- 2006: Tiidrek Nurme
- 2007: Tiidrek Nurme
- 2008: Aleksei Markov
- 2009: Taivo Püi
- 2010: Sergei Tšerepannikov
- 2011: Tiidrek Nurme
- 2012: Allar Lamp
- 2013: Sergei Tšerepannikov
- 2014: Roman Fosti
- 2015: Tiidrek Nurme
- 2016: Keio Kits
- 2017: Tiidrek Nurme
- 2018: Tiidrek Nurme
- 2019: Tiidrek Nurme
- 2020: Tiidrek Nurme
- 2021: Tiidrek Nurme
- 2022: Kaur Kivistik

=== 10,000 metres ===
- 1991: Vjatšeslav Košelev
- 1992: Heiki Sarapuu
- 1993: Meelis Veilberg
- 1994: Toomas Tarm
- 1995: Rein Valdmaa
- 1996: Pavel Loskutov
- 1997: Meelis Veilberg
- 1998: Pavel Loskutov
- 1999: Pavel Loskutov
- 2000: Toomas Tarm
- 2001: Pavel Loskutov
- 2002: Toomas Tarm
- 2003: Margus Pirksaar
- 2004: Toomas Tarm
- 2005: Margus Pirksaar
- 2006: Margus Pirksaar

=== Half marathon ===
- 1993: Pavel Loskutov
- 1994: Heiki Sarapuu
- 1995: Margus Pirksaar
- 1996: Pavel Loskutov
- 1997: Margus Pirksaar
- 1998: Ahto Tatter
- 1999: Pavel Loskutov
- 2000: Pavel Loskutov
- 2001: Pavel Loskutov
- 2002: Pavel Loskutov
- 2003: Pavel Loskutov
- 2004: Pavel Loskutov
- 2005: Pavel Loskutov

=== Marathon ===
- 1927: Elmar Reiman
- 1928: Karl Laas
- 1929: Karl Laas
- 1930: Karl Laas
- 1931–1933: –
- 1934: Alfred Maasik
- 1935: Otto Treimann
- 1936: August Koidu
- 1937–1938: –
- 1939: Bernhard Lont
- 1940: Bernhard Lont
- 1941–1946: –
- 1947: Loit Laidna
- 1948: Aleksander Külm
- 1949: Richard Lulla
- 1950: Viktor Puusepp
- 1951: Nikolai Kanajev
- 1952: Arnold Vaabla
- 1953: Viktor Puusepp
- 1954: Viktor Puusepp
- 1955: Viktor Puusepp
- 1956: Viktor Puusepp
- 1957: Viktor Puusepp
- 1958: Arkaadi Birkenfeldt
- 1959: Rein Leinus
- 1960: Rein Leinus
- 1961: Rein Leinus
- 1962: Rein Leinus
- 1963: Rein Leinus
- 1964: Ronald Suur
- 1965: Ronald Suur
- 1966: Ronald Suur
- 1967: Rein Leinus
- 1968: Rein Leinus
- 1969: Rein Leinus
- 1970: Rein Leinus
- 1971: Mart Kalder
- 1972: Jüri Liim
- 1973: Mati Kartau
- 1974: Küllo Tiido
- 1975: Toivo Koovit
- 1976: Küllo Tiido
- 1977: Toivo Koovit
- 1978: Aare Kuum
- 1979: Avo Järv
- 1980: Aare Kuum
- 1981: Rene Meimer
- 1982: Vladimir Heerik
- 1983: Villy Sudemäe
- 1984: Villy Sudemäe
- 1985: Villy Sudemäe
- 1986: Kalev Urbanik
- 1987: Meelis Veilberg
- 1988: Rein Valdmaa
- 1989: Kaupo Sabre
- 1990: Kaupo Sabre
- 1991: Kaupo Sabre
- 1992: Vello Misler
- 1993: Rein Valdmaa
- 1994: Henno Haava
- 1995: Vladimir Arhipov
- 1996: Kaupo Sabre
- 1997: Margus Pirksaar
- 1998: Toomas Tarm
- 1999: Kaupo Sabre
- 2000: Vladimir Bõtšuk
- 2001: Kaupo Sabre
- 2002: Toomas Tarm
- 2003: Toomas Tarm
- 2004: Toomas Tarm
- 2005: Margus Lehtna
- 2006: Taavi Tambur
- 2007: Aleksei Saveljev
- 2008: Aleksei Markov
- 2009: Aleksei Markov
- 2010: Pavel Loskutov
- 2011: Kaupo Sasmin
- 2012: Viljar Vallimäe
- 2013: Roman Fosti
- 2014: Heinar Vaine
- 2015: Sergei Tšerepannikov
- 2016: Heinar Vaine
- 2017: Argo Jõesoo
- 2018: Roman Fosti
- 2019: Raido Mitt
- 2020: Rauno Jallai
- 2021: Dmitri Aristov

=== 3000 metres steeplechase ===
- 1991: Veljo Lamp
- 1992: Veljo Lamp
- 1993: Pavel Loskutov
- 1994: Pavel Loskutov
- 1995: Pavel Loskutov
- 1996: Veljo Lamp
- 1997: Risto Puusepp
- 1998: Arli Mändmets
- 1999: Kaupo Tiislär
- 2000: Kaupo Tiislär
- 2001: Kaupo Tiislär
- 2002: Sergei Tšerepannikov
- 2003: Kaupo Tiislär
- 2004: Kaupo Tiislär
- 2005: Aleksei Saveljev
- 2006: Aleksei Saveljev

=== 110 metres hurdles ===
- 1991: Indrek Kaseorg
- 1992: Hendrik Leetmäe
- 1993: Hendrik Leetmäe
- 1994: Indrek Kaseorg
- 1995: Hendrik Leetmäe
- 1996: Hendrik Leetmäe
- 1997: Hendrik Leetmäe
- 1998: Erki Nool
- 1999: Erki Nool
- 2000: Tarmo Jallai
- 2001: Rene Oruman
- 2002: Jüri Kafanov
- 2003: Tarmo Jallai
- 2004: Tarmo Jallai
- 2005: Tarmo Jallai
- 2006: Rene Oruman

=== 400 metres hurdles ===
- 1991: Vladimir Šmarjov
- 1992: Marek Helinurm
- 1993: Marek Helinurm
- 1994: Indrek Kaseorg
- 1995: Tiit Mauer
- 1996: Tiit Mauer
- 1997: Indrek Kaseorg
- 1998: Indrek Tustit
- 1999: Indrek Tustit
- 2000: Kristjan Suur
- 2001: Andrei Oll
- 2002: Indrek Tustit
- 2003: Andrei Oll
- 2004: Indrek Tustit
- 2005: Indrek Tustit
- 2006: Indrek Tustit

=== High jump ===
- 1917*: Sergei Rutkovski
- 1918*: Artur Proos
- 1919*: Bernhard Abrams
- 1920: Aleksander Klumberg
- 1921: Aleksander Klumberg
- 1922: Aleksander Klumberg
- 1923: Aleksander Klumberg
- 1924: Aleksander Klumberg
- 1925: Paul Steinberg
- 1926: Evald Roht
- 1927: Aleksander Klumberg
- 1928: Evald Roht
- 1929: Evald Kink
- 1930: Gustav Sule
- 1931: Gert Schmidt
- 1932: Gert Schmidt
- 1933: Aksel Kuuse
- 1934: Gert Schmidt
- 1935: Aksel Kuuse
- 1936: Aksel Kuuse
- 1937: Aksel Kuuse
- 1938: Olev Kaldre
- 1939: Olev Kaldre
- 1940: Lembit Kiisa
- 1941: –
- 1942: Viktor Palango
- 1943: Viktor Palango
- 1944: Viktor Palango
- 1945: Ants Kalda
- 1946: Erich Pilliroog
- 1947: Erich Pilliroog
- 1948: Erich Pilliroog
- 1949: Ülo Raidma
- 1950: Heino Apart
- 1951: Heino Apart
- 1952: Heino Apart
- 1953: Uno Palu
- 1954: Juhan Unger
- 1955: Ivo Jürviste
- 1956: Juhan Unger
- 1957: Rein Ellermaa
- 1958: Rein Ellermaa
- 1959: Jaak Ilves
- 1960: Rein Ellermaa
- 1961: Rein Ellermaa
- 1962: Valdeko Ruven
- 1963: Igor Kurve
- 1964: Igor Kurve
- 1965: Jüri Tarmak
- 1966: Jüri Tarmak
- 1967: Jüri Tarmak
- 1968: Vello Lumi
- 1969: Toomas Berendsen
- 1970: Valeri Peterson
- 1971: Andres Külvand
- 1972: Vello Lumi
- 1973: Villu Mengel
- 1974: Heiki Kask
- 1975: Vello Lumi
- 1976: Vello Lumi
- 1977: Heiki Kask
- 1978: Tiit Pahapill
- 1979: Tiit Pahapill
- 1980: Tiit Pahapill
- 1981: Ain Evard
- 1982: Ain Evard
- 1983: Tarmo Valgepea
- 1984: Kalev Martsepp
- 1985: Ain Evard
- 1986: Ain Evard
- 1987: Ain Evard
- 1988: Ain Evard
- 1989: Ain Evard
- 1990: Ain Evard
- 1991: Ain Evard
- 1992: Ain Evard
- 1993: Ain Evard
- 1994: Ain Evard
- 1995: Ramon Kaju
- 1996: Ramon Kaju
- 1997: Marko Turban
- 1998: Ramon Kaju
- 1999: Ramon Kaju
- 2000: Marko Aleksejev
- 2001: Ramon Kaju
- 2002: Marko Aleksejev
- 2003: Marko Aleksejev
- 2004: Marko Aleksejev
- 2005: Marko Aleksejev
- 2006: Marko Aleksejev
- 2007: Marko Aleksejev
- 2008: Karl Lumi
- 2009: Karl Lumi
- 2010: Karl Lumi
- 2011: Karl Lumi
- 2012: Karl Lumi
- 2013: Karl Lumi
- 2014: Hendrik Lepik
- 2015: Karl Lumi
- 2016: Karl Lumi
- 2017: Karl Lumi
- 2018: Karl Lumi
- 2019: Karl Lumi
- 2020: Kristjan Tafenau
- 2021: Hendrik Lillemets
- 2022: Hendrik Lillemets

=== Pole vault ===
- 1991: Valeri Bukrejev
- 1992: Valeri Bukrejev
- 1993: Valeri Bukrejev
- 1994: Erki Nool
- 1995: Marco Kirm
- 1996: Erki Nool
- 1997: Erki Nool
- 1998: Lennart Oja
- 1999: Lennart Oja
- 2000: Aivo Normak
- 2001: Eigo Siimu
- 2002: Kristo Kallavus
- 2003: Erki Nool
- 2004: Erki Nool
- 2005: Gert Rahnel
- 2006: Eigo Siimu

=== Long jump ===
- 1991: Sergei Tanaga
- 1992: Urmas Treiel
- 1993: Urmas Treiel
- 1994: Sergei Tanaga
- 1995: Priit Soosaar
- 1996: Ramon Kaju
- 1997: Indrek Kaseorg
- 1998: Priit Soosaar
- 1999: Priit Soosaar
- 2000: Mikk Joorits
- 2001: Risko Nuuma
- 2002: Ilja Tumorin
- 2003: Ilja Tumorin
- 2004: Igor Brjuhhov
- 2005: Jaanus Uudmäe
- 2006: Jaanus Uudmäe

=== Triple jump ===
- 1991: Marek Vellend
- 1992: Hannes Männik
- 1993: Sergei Tanaga
- 1994: Sergei Tanaga
- 1995: Sergei Tanaga
- 1996: Hannes Männik
- 1997: Sergei Tanaga
- 1998: Ilja Tumorin
- 1999: Hannes Männik
- 2000: Ilja Tumorin
- 2001: Ilja Tumorin
- 2002: Lauri Leis
- 2003: Lauri Leis
- 2004: Jaanus Suvi
- 2005: Jaanus Uudmäe
- 2006: Lauri Leis

=== Shot put ===
- 1991: Ants Kiisa
- 1992: Ants Kiisa
- 1993: Margus Tammaru
- 1994: Ants Kiisa
- 1995: Ants Kiisa
- 1996: Ants Kiisa
- 1997: Margus Tammaru
- 1998: Aleksander Tammert
- 1999: Margus Tammaru
- 2000: Margus Tammaru
- 2001: Margus Tammaru
- 2002: Aleksander Tammert
- 2003: Taavi Peetre
- 2004: Taavi Peetre
- 2005: Taavi Peetre
- 2006: Taavi Peetre

=== Discus throw ===
- 1917*: Aleksander Klumberg
- 1918*: Aleksander Klumberg
- 1919*: Harald Tammer
- 1920: Harald Tammer
- 1921: Harald Tammer
- 1922: Aleksander Klumberg
- 1923: Aleksander Klumberg
- 1924: Gustav Kalkun
- 1925: Gustav Kalkun
- 1926: Aleksander Klumberg
- 1927: Mihkal Liinat
- 1928: Gustav Kalkun
- 1929: Nikolai Feldmann
- 1930: Nikolai Feldmann
- 1931: Nikolai Feldmann
- 1932: Nikolai Feldmann
- 1933: Arnold Viiding
- 1934: Arnold Viiding
- 1935: Arnold Viiding
- 1936: Oskar Erikson
- 1937: Oskar Erikson
- 1938: Oskar Erikson
- 1939: Paul Määrits
- 1940: Oskar Linnaste
- 1941: –
- 1942: Oskar Linnaste
- 1943: Aleksander Kreek
- 1944: Elmar Lilienthal
- 1945: Aadu Tarmak
- 1946: Aadu Tarmak
- 1947: Arvo Putmaker
- 1948: Heino Lipp
- 1949: Heino Lipp
- 1950: Dimitri Prants
- 1951: Heino Lipp
- 1952: Heino Lipp
- 1953: Heino Lipp
- 1954: Heino Lipp
- 1955: Heino Apart
- 1956: Heino Heinaste
- 1957: Heino Apart
- 1958: Kaupo Metsur
- 1959: Kaupo Metsur
- 1960: Kaupo Metsur
- 1961: Enn Erikson
- 1962: Kaupo Metsur
- 1963: Kaupo Metsur
- 1964: Kaupo Metsur
- 1965: Kaupo Metsur
- 1966: Kaupo Metsur
- 1967: Kaupo Metsur
- 1968: Kaupo Metsur
- 1969: Enn Erikson
- 1970: Veljo Kuusemäe
- 1971: Enn Erikson
- 1972: Enn Erikson
- 1973: Enn Erikson
- 1974: Veljo Kuusemäe
- 1975: Enn Erikson
- 1976: Veljo Kuusemäe
- 1977: Veljo Kuusemäe
- 1978: Veljo Kuusemäe
- 1979: Kalev Külv
- 1980: Kalev Külv
- 1981: Kalev Külv
- 1982: Kalev Külv
- 1983: Kalev Külv
- 1984: Kalev Külv
- 1985: Kalev Külv
- 1986: Kalev Külv
- 1987: Kalev Külv
- 1988: Kalev Külv
- 1989: Kalev Külv
- 1990: Ants Kiisa
- 1991: Valter Külvet
- 1992: Ants Kiisa
- 1993: Aleksander Tammert
- 1994: Aleksander Tammert
- 1995: Aleksander Tammert
- 1996: Ants Kiisa
- 1997: Aleksander Tammert
- 1998: Aleksander Tammert
- 1999: Aleksander Tammert
- 2000: Aleksander Tammert
- 2001: Aleksander Tammert
- 2002: Aleksander Tammert
- 2003: Aleksander Tammert
- 2004: Gerd Kanter
- 2005: Gerd Kanter
- 2006: Gerd Kanter
- 2007: Gerd Kanter
- 2008: Gerd Kanter
- 2009: Gerd Kanter
- 2010: Aleksander Tammert
- 2011: Gerd Kanter
- 2012: Gerd Kanter
- 2013: Gerd Kanter
- 2014: Gerd Kanter
- 2015: Gerd Kanter
- 2016: Martin Kupper
- 2017: Martin Kupper
- 2018: Gerd Kanter
- 2019: Gerd Kanter
- 2020: Martin Kupper
- 2021: Martin Kupper
- 2022: Kevin Sakson

=== Hammer throw ===
- 1991: Jüri Tamm
- 1992: Matti Raudsepp
- 1993: Jüri Tamm
- 1994: Jüri Tamm
- 1995: Matti Raudsepp
- 1996: Matti Raudsepp
- 1997: Matti Raudsepp
- 1998: Matti Raudsepp
- 1999: Matti Raudsepp
- 2000: Matti Raudsepp
- 2001: Martti Merila
- 2002: Martti Merila
- 2003: Märt Israel
- 2004: Märt Israel
- 2005: Marek Vähi
- 2006: Martti Merila

=== Javelin throw ===
- 1917*: Aleksander Klumberg
- 1918*: Aleksander Klumberg
- 1919*: Aleksander Klumberg
- 1920: Aleksander Klumberg
- 1921: Aleksander Klumberg
- 1922: Aleksander Klumberg
- 1923: Aleksander Klumberg
- 1924: Aleksander Klumberg
- 1925: Johann Meimer
- 1926: Johann Meimer
- 1927: Aleksander Klumberg
- 1928: Johannes Schütz
- 1929: Gustav Sule
- 1930: Gustav Sule
- 1931: Gustav Sule
- 1932: Gustav Sule
- 1933: Gustav Sule
- 1934: Gustav Sule
- 1935: Gustav Sule
- 1936: Artur Mägi
- 1937: Gustav Sule
- 1938: Gustav Sule
- 1939: Artur Mägi
- 1940: Friedrich Issak
- 1941: –
- 1942: Paul Vares
- 1943: Endel Nääb
- 1944: Johannes Püss
- 1945: Harry Vallmann
- 1946: Friedrich Issak
- 1947: Friedrich Issak
- 1948: Ants Maiste
- 1949: Harry Vallmann
- 1950: Roland Ilves
- 1951: Ants Maiste
- 1952: Harry Vallmann
- 1953: John Põldsam
- 1954: Heino Tiik
- 1955: John Põldsam
- 1956: Charles Vallmann
- 1957: Charles Vallmann
- 1958: Mart Paama
- 1959: Charles Vallmann
- 1960: Charles Vallmann
- 1961: Mart Paama
- 1962: Charles Vallmann
- 1963: Mart Paama
- 1964: Charles Vallmann
- 1965: Mart Paama
- 1966: Toomas Savi
- 1967: Vambola Poljakov
- 1968: Mart Paama
- 1969: Mart Paama
- 1970: Mart Paama
- 1971: Mart Paama
- 1972: Mart Paama
- 1973: Mart Paama
- 1974: Ain Veenpere
- 1975: Heino Puuste
- 1976: Ain Veenpere
- 1977: Agu Rukki
- 1978: Kalju Mägi
- 1979: Heino Puuste
- 1980: Toivo Moorast
- 1981: Heino Puuste
- 1982: Toivo Moorast
- 1983: Toivo Moorast
- 1984: Ülo Rukki
- 1985: Marek Kaleta
- 1986: Olavi Malts
- 1987: Sulev Lepik
- 1988: Marek Kaleta
- 1989: Marek Kaleta
- 1990: Toivo Moorast
- 1991: Sulev Lepik
- 1992: Marek Kaleta
- 1993: Donald Sild
- 1994: Donald Sild
- 1995: Marek Kaleta
- 1996: Margus Kübar
- 1997: Donald Sild
- 1998: Heiko Väät
- 1999: Andrus Värnik
- 2000: Andrus Värnik
- 2001: Heiko Väät
- 2002: Rainer Raudsepp
- 2003: Andrus Värnik
- 2004: Andrus Värnik
- 2005: Andrus Värnik
- 2006: Andrus Värnik
- 2007: Risto Mätas
- 2008: Mihkel Kukk
- 2009: Tanel Laanmäe
- 2010: Ahti Peder
- 2011: Mihkel Kukk
- 2012: Risto Mätas
- 2013: Risto Mätas
- 2014: Tanel Laanmäe
- 2015: Magnus Kirt
- 2016: Tanel Laanmäe
- 2017: Magnus Kirt
- 2018: Magnus Kirt
- 2019: Magnus Kirt
- 2020: Ranno Koorep
- 2021: Ergo Tamm
- 2022: Magnus Kirt

=== Decathlon ===
- 1920: Aleksander Klumberg
- 1921: –
- 1922: Eugen Neumann
- 1923: Heinrich Paal
- 1924: Aleksander Klumberg
- 1925: Elmar Rähn
- 1926: Richard Ivask
- 1927: Mihkel Liinat
- 1928: Evald Kink
- 1929: Johann Meimer
- 1930: Johann Meimer
- 1931: Edgar Tamm
- 1932: Arnold Niggol
- 1933: Arnold Niggol
- 1934: Elmar Lilienthal
- 1935: Elmar Lilienthal
- 1936: Elmar Rähn
- 1937: Elmar Lilienthal
- 1938: Heino Koik
- 1939: Toivo Õunap
- 1940: Heino Koik
- 1941: –
- 1942: Paul Toomla
- 1943: Johannes Rander
- 1944: Heino Lipp
- 1945: Paul Toomla
- 1946: Heino Lipp
- 1947: Heino Lipp
- 1948: Karl Lont
- 1949: Heino Lipp
- 1950: Heino Lipp
- 1951: Viktor Hellerma
- 1952: Heino Tiik
- 1953: Pavel Šenitsev
- 1954: Heino Tiik
- 1955: Uno Palu
- 1956: Uno Palu
- 1957: Aleksander Transtok
- 1958: Uno Palu
- 1959: Heinrich Kriivan
- 1960: Uno Palu
- 1961: Rein Aun
- 1962: Heino Tiik
- 1963: Uno Palu
- 1964: Uno Palu
- 1965: Priit Paalo
- 1966: Priit Paalo
- 1967: Priit Paalo
- 1968: Rein Tõru
- 1969: Kaidu Meitern
- 1970: Heino Sildoja
- 1971: Jaan Lember
- 1972: Kaidu Meitern
- 1973: Peeter Põld
- 1974: Peeter Põld
- 1975: Peep Tõnisson
- 1976: Toomas Suurväli
- 1977: Tõnu Kaukis
- 1978: Toomas Suurväli
- 1979: Margus Kasearu
- 1980: Tõnu Kaukis
- 1981: Valter Külvet
- 1982: Sven Reintak
- 1983: Urmas Käen
- 1984: Sven Reintak
- 1985: Sven Reintak
- 1986: Tiit Pahker
- 1987: Tiit Pahker
- 1988: Aivar Haller
- 1989: Ain Arro
- 1990: Erki Nool
- 1991: Indrek Kaseorg
- 1992: Erki Nool
- 1993: Indrek Kaseorg
- 1994: Valter Külvet
- 1995: Valter Külvet
- 1996: Raido Mägi
- 1997: Raido Mägi
- 1998: Sven Simuste
- 1999: Aivo Normak
- 2000: Aivo Normak
- 2001: Indrek Kaseorg
- 2002: Villu Sepp
- 2003: Indrek Kaseorg
- 2004: Päärn Brauer
- 2005: Andres Raja
- 2006: Andres Raja
- 2007: Aigar Kukk
- 2008: Mikk Pahapill
- 2009: Indrek Turi
- 2010: Andres Raja
- 2011: Tarmo Riitmuru
- 2012: Hendrik Lepik
- 2013: Andres Raja
- 2014: Kaarel Jõeväli
- 2015: Taavi Tšernjavski
- 2016: Kristjan Rosenberg
- 2017: Taavi Tšernjavski
- 2018: Taavi Tšernjavski
- 2019: Janek Õiglane
- 2020: Risto Lillemets
- 2021: Kristjan Rosenberg
- 2022: Maicel Uibo

=== 20,000 metres walk ===
- 1991: Vladimir Kostjutšenkov
- 1992: Vladimir Kostjutšenkov
- 1993: Mart Järviste
- 1994: Mart Järviste
- 1995: Mart Järviste
- 1996: Mart Järviste
- 1997: Toivo Tanning
- 1998: Lauri Lelumees
- 1999: Lauri Lelumees
- 2000: Margus Luik
- 2001: Margus Luik
- 2002: Margus Luik
- 2003: Margus Luik
- 2004: Sergei Kutsenko
- 2005: Margus Luik
- 2006: Lauri Lelumees

=== 50 kilometres walk ===
- 1997: Toivo Tanning
- 1998: Ants Palmar
- 1999: Lauri Lelumees
- 2000: Lauri Lelumees
- 2001: Lauri Lelumees
- 2002: Lauri Lelumees
- 2003: Margus Luik
- 2004: Margus Luik
- 2005: Margus Luik

== Women ==
=== 100 metres ===
- 1927: Sara Teitelbaum
- 1928: Sara Teitelbaum
- 1929: Sara Teitelbaum
- 1930: Sara Teitelbaum
- 1931: Sara Teitelbaum
- 1932: Taimo Kelder
- 1933: Gertrud Labrik
- 1934: Taimo Kelder
- 1935: Ilse Uus
- 1936: Henriette Israel
- 1937: Ilse Uus
- 1938: Ilse Uus
- 1939: Ilse Uus
- 1940: Ilse Uus
- 1941: -
- 1942: Karin Aviste
- 1943: Laine Hein
- 1944: Laine Hein
- 1945: Eugenia Laasik
- 1946: Eugenia Laasik
- 1947: Eugenia Laasik
- 1948: Eugenia Laasik
- 1949: Helve Karilaid
- 1950: Juta Sandbank
- 1951: Juta Sandbank
- 1952: Liivia Pütsepp
- 1953: Salme Tornius
- 1954: Liivia Pütsepp
- 1955: Salme Tornius
- 1956: Liivia Pütsepp
- 1957: Salme Tornius
- 1958: Liivia Härsing
- 1959: Liivia Härsing
- 1960: Liivia Härsing
- 1961: Liivia Härsing
- 1962: Liivia Härsing
- 1963: Liivia Härsing
- 1964: Tamara Palm
- 1965: Helgi Mägi
- 1966: Helgi Mägi
- 1967: Helle Volmer
- 1968: Hilju Lillo
- 1969: Helgi Mägi
- 1970: Marion Piisang
- 1971: Tiina Torop
- 1972: Galina Pavlova
- 1973: Tiina Torop
- 1974: Galina Schneider
- 1975: Irina Stehhina
- 1976: Taisi Pihela
- 1977: Sirje Põldma
- 1978: Merike Õunpuu
- 1979: Aili Alliksoo
- 1980: Saima Tiik
- 1981: Taimi Loov
- 1982: Saima Tiik
- 1983: Tatjana Petruškevitš
- 1984: Helle Kruuse
- 1985: Irina Vassiljeva
- 1986: Taimi Kõnn
- 1987: Irina Vassiljeva
- 1988: Riina Suhotskaja
- 1989: Riina Suhotskaja
- 1990: Riina Suhotskaja
- 1991: Anu Kaljurand
- 1992: Anu Kaljurand
- 1993: Rutti Luksepp
- 1994: Milena Alver
- 1995: Milena Alver
- 1996: Kertu Tiitso
- 1997: Rutti Luksepp
- 1998: Rutti Luksepp
- 1999: Rutti Luksepp
- 2000: Marianna Voronina
- 2001: Katrin Käärt
- 2002: Katrin Käärt
- 2003: Kadri Viigipuu
- 2004: Katrin Käärt
- 2005: Katrin Käärt
- 2006: Ksenija Balta
- 2007: Ksenija Balta
- 2008: Ksenija Balta
- 2009: Anita Maksimova
- 2010: Grit Šadeiko
- 2011: Grit Šadeiko
- 2012: Maarja Kalev
- 2013: Ksenija Balta
- 2014: Maarja Kalev
- 2015: Maarja Kalev
- 2016: Ksenija Balta
- 2017: Maarja Kalev
- 2018: Õilme Võro
- 2019: Õilme Võro
- 2020: Ksenija Balta
- 2021: Karoli Käärt
- 2022: Ann Marii Kivikas

=== 200 metres ===
- 1991: Tatjana Iljina
- 1992: Rutti Luksepp
- 1993: Killu Ratas
- 1994: Milena Alver
- 1995: Milena Alver
- 1996: Rutti Luksepp
- 1997: Rutti Luksepp
- 1998: Rutti Luksepp
- 1999: Katrin Käärt
- 2000: Rutti Luksepp
- 2001: Katrin Käärt
- 2002: Egle Uljas
- 2003: Rutti Luksepp
- 2004: Ebe Reier
- 2005: Kadri Viigipuu
- 2006: Maris Mägi

=== 400 metres ===
- 1991: Natalja Popova
- 1992: Anna Burunova
- 1993: Killu Ratas
- 1994: Tiia Eeskivi
- 1995: Rutti Luksepp
- 1996: Rutti Luksepp
- 1997: Killu Ratas
- 1998: Maria Sahharova
- 1999: Maria Sahharova
- 2000: Maria Sahharova
- 2001: Julia Krasnova
- 2002: Rutti Luksepp
- 2003: Jekaterina Duman
- 2004: Maria Sahharova
- 2005: Jekaterina Duman
- 2006: Maris Mägi

=== 800 metres ===
- 1991: Natalja Pihelgasi
- 1992: Katrin Rehemaa
- 1993: Agneta Land
- 1994: Agneta Land
- 1995: Agneta Land
- 1996: Maile Mangusson
- 1997: Maile Mangusson
- 1998: Maile Mangusson
- 1999: Maile Mangusson
- 2000: Maile Mangusson
- 2001: Maile Mangusson
- 2002: Vaiki Aunin
- 2003: Maile Mangusson
- 2004: Maria Sahharova
- 2005: Maria Sahharova
- 2006: Maria Sahharova

=== 1500 metres ===
- 1991: Ille Kukk
- 1992: Sirje Eichelmann
- 1993: Sirje Eichelmann
- 1994: Jane Salumäe
- 1995: Agneta Land
- 1996: Natalja Buljukina
- 1997: Natalja Buljukina
- 1998: Maile Mangusson
- 1999: Maile Mangusson
- 2000: Maile Mangusson
- 2001: Maile Mangusson
- 2002: Kadri Kelve
- 2003: Maile Mangusson
- 2004: Maile Mangusson
- 2005: Jekaterina Patjuk
- 2006: Jekaterina Patjuk

=== 3000 metres ===
- 1991: Ille Kukk
- 1992: Sirje Eichelmann
- 1993: Sirje Eichelmann
- 1994: Jane Salumäe
- 1995: Ille Kukk
- 1996: Ille Kukk
- 1997: Natalja Buljukina
- 1998: Külli Kaljus

=== 5000 metres ===
- 1999: Liilia Kesküla
- 2000: Külli Kaljus
- 2001: Kadri Kelve
- 2002: Kadri Kelve
- 2003: Kadri Kelve
- 2004: Kadri Kelve
- 2005: Jekaterina Patjuk
- 2006: Jekaterina Patjuk
- 2007: Jekaterina Patjuk
- 2008: Jekaterina Patjuk
- 2009: Jekaterina Patjuk
- 2010: Jekaterina Patjuk
- 2011: Annika Rihma
- 2012: Jekaterina Patjuk
- 2013: Jekaterina Patjuk
- 2014: Jekaterina Patjuk
- 2015: Jekaterina Patjuk
- 2016: Egle-Helene Ervin
- 2017: Jekaterina Patjuk
- 2018: Lily Luik

=== Half marathon ===
- 1993: Sirje Eichelmann
- 1994: Sirje Eichelmann
- 1995: Madli Tuuling
- 1996: Madli Tuuling
- 1997: Külli Kaljus
- 1998: Madli Tuuling
- 1999: Külli Kaljus
- 2000: Külli Kaljus
- 2001: Külli Kaljus
- 2002: Liilia Kesküla
- 2003: Külli Kaljus
- 2004: Kadri Kelve
- 2005: Tiina Tross

=== Marathon ===
- 1991: Galina Bernat
- 1992: Sirje Eichelmann
- 1993: Siiri Kangur
- 1994: Galina Bernat
- 1995: Kaja Mulla
- 1996: Tiina Idavain
- 1997: Galina Bernat
- 1998: Kaja Mulla
- 1999: Sirje Velba
- 2000: Kaja Mulla
- 2001: Sirje Velba
- 2002: Sirje Velba
- 2003: Ülle Kummer-Leman
- 2004: Sigrid Valdre
- 2005: Tiina Tross

=== 3000 metres steeplechase ===
- 2003: Anastasia Gerassimova
- 2004: Olga Andrejeva
- 2005: Olga Andrejeva
- 2006: Katrin Kuusk

=== 100 metres hurdles ===
- 1991: Anu Kaljurand
- 1992: Anu Kaljurand
- 1993: Virge Naeris
- 1994: Kertu Tiitso
- 1995: Kertu Tiitso
- 1996: Tiia Eeskivi
- 1997: Marge Salujõe
- 1998: Kertu Tiitso
- 1999: Triin Maller
- 2000: Jaanika Meriküll
- 2001: Mirjam Liimask
- 2002: Mirjam Liimask
- 2003: Mirjam Liimask
- 2004: Mirjam Liimask
- 2005: Kadri Viigipuu
- 2006: Mirjam Liimask

=== 400 metres hurdles ===
- 1991: Tiia Eeskivi
- 1992: Reili Liiva
- 1993: Ingrid Maiste
- 1994: Tiia Eeskivi
- 1995: Tiia Eeskivi
- 1996: Tiia Eeskivi
- 1997: Evelin Talts
- 1998: Kristi Kiirats
- 1999: Tiia Eeskivi
- 2000: Milena Alver
- 2001: Julia Krasnova
- 2002: Julia Krasnova
- 2003: Julia Krasnova
- 2004: Julia Krasnova
- 2005: Vera Duman
- 2006: Kristi Kiirats

=== High jump ===
- 1923: Rosine Peek
- 1924: Olga Rebane
- 1925: Lydia Tippo
- 1926: Antonia Kroon
- 1927: Ludmilla Einstein
- 1928: Magda Tomasson
- 1929: Gertrud Schiefner
- 1930: Lydia Raudsepp
- 1931: Lydia Raudsepp
- 1932: Olga Arras
- 1933: Olga Arras
- 1934: Lydia Raudsepp
- 1935: Lydia Erikson
- 1936: Olga Arras
- 1937: Olga Arras
- 1938: Olga Arras
- 1939: Leida Hiiepuu
- 1940: Olga Arras
- 1941: -
- 1942: Olga Usar
- 1943: Olga Usar
- 1944: Aino Unt
- 1945: Leida Hiiepuu
- 1946: Olga Usar
- 1947: Olga Usar
- 1948: Olga Usar
- 1949: Juta Raudsepp
- 1950: Aino Huimerind
- 1951: Juta Raudsepp
- 1952: Juta Raudsepp
- 1953: Taimi Kroon
- 1954: Maila Kurss
- 1955: Helvi Keller
- 1956: Helgi Haljasmaa
- 1957: Õie Munk
- 1958: Helgi Kivi
- 1959: Linda Kivi
- 1960: Valentina Pavlovitš
- 1961: Eha Sepp
- 1962: Valentina Pavlovitš
- 1963: Valentina Pavlovitš
- 1964: Valentina Pavlovitš
- 1965: Valentina Pavlovitš
- 1966: Ene Rampe
- 1967: Õie Munk
- 1968: Muza Vorotõntseva
- 1969: Ester Aavik
- 1970: Muza Lepik
- 1971: Reet Kaarneem
- 1972: Reet Kaarneem
- 1973: Malle Sang
- 1974: Malle Sang
- 1975: Reet Arrak
- 1976: Reet Arrak
- 1977: Marina Surovtseva
- 1978: Ljubov Stognei
- 1979: Reet Lindal
- 1980: Merle Kibus
- 1981: Lea Laks
- 1982: Siiri Schmidt
- 1983: Maiu Siraki
- 1984: Merle Kibus
- 1985: Maiu Siraki
- 1986: Ingrid Pulst
- 1987: Merike Suurkivi
- 1988: Virge Naeris
- 1989: Ly Niinelaid
- 1990: Ly Niinelaid
- 1991: Marika Raiski
- 1992: Virge Naeris
- 1993: Liina Põldots
- 1994: Virge Naeris
- 1995: Liina Põldots
- 1996: Liina Põldots
- 1997: Kärt Siilats
- 1998: Kärt Siilats
- 1999: Tiina Mägi
- 2000: Kärt Siilats
- 2001: Tiina Mägi
- 2002: Kärt Siilats
- 2003: Kärt Siilats
- 2004: Kärt Siilats
- 2005: Anna Iljuštšenko
- 2006: Anna Iljuštšenko
- 2007: Anna Iljuštšenko
- 2008: Anna Iljuštšenko
- 2009: Anna Iljuštšenko
- 2010: Anna Iljuštšenko
- 2011: Anna Iljuštšenko
- 2012: Eleriin Haas
- 2013: Anna Iljuštšenko
- 2014: Eleriin Haas
- 2015: Eleriin Haas
- 2016: Anna Iljuštšenko
- 2017: Grete Udras
- 2018: Eleriin Haas
- 2019: Grete Udras
- 2020: Lilian Turban
- 2021: Lilian Turban
- 2022: Karmen Bruus

=== Pole vault ===
- 1997: Margit Randver
- 1998: Merle Kivimets
- 1999: Margit Randver
- 2000: Merle Kivimets
- 2001: Margit Randver
- 2002: Margit Randver
- 2003: Kristin Karu
- 2004: Lea Saapar
- 2005: Kristina Ulitina
- 2006: Kristina Ulitina
- 2007: Lembi Vaher
- 2008: Lembi Vaher
- 2009: Lembi Vaher
- 2010: Lembi Vaher
- 2011: Reena Koll
- 2012: Lembi Vaher
- 2013: Lembi Vaher
- 2014: Reena Koll
- 2015: Reena Koll
- 2016: Getter Marie Lemberg
- 2017: Lembi Vaher
- 2018: Reena Koll
- 2019: Marleen Mülla
- 2020: Marleen Mülla
- 2021: Marleen Mülla
- 2022: Marleen Mülla

=== Long jump ===
- 1991: Renna Tõniste
- 1992: Virge Naeris
- 1993: Virge Naeris
- 1994: Virge Naeris
- 1995: Kristel Berendsen
- 1996: Renna Tõniste
- 1997: Anu Anderson
- 1998: Virge Naeris
- 1999: Riina Vals
- 2000: Riina Vals
- 2001: Diana Nikitina
- 2002: Larissa Netšeporuk
- 2003: Larissa Netšeporuk
- 2004: Kristel Berendsen
- 2005: Kristel Berendsen
- 2006: Veera Baranova

=== Triple jump ===
- 1991: Carina Kjellman
- 1992: Marika Raiski
- 1993: Virge Naeris
- 1994: Renna Tõniste
- 1995: Renna Tõniste
- 1996: Renna Tõniste
- 1997: Kristel Berendsen
- 1998: Virge Naeris
- 1999: Virge Naeris
- 2000: Diana Nikitina
- 2001: Diana Nikitina
- 2002: Sirkka-Liisa Kivine
- 2003: Sirkka-Liisa Kivine
- 2004: Veera Baranova
- 2005: Veera Baranova
- 2006: Veera Baranova

=== Shot put ===
- 1991: Eha Rünne
- 1992: Eha Rünne
- 1993: Eha Rünne
- 1994: Eha Rünne
- 1995: Eha Rünne
- 1996: Eha Rünne
- 1997: Eha Rünne
- 1998: Eha Rünne
- 1999: Eha Rünne
- 2000: Eha Rünne
- 2001: Eha Rünne
- 2002: Eha Rünne
- 2003: Eha Rünne
- 2004: Eha Rünne
- 2005: Eha Rünne
- 2006: Eha Rünne

=== Discus throw ===
- 1991: Elju Kubi
- 1992: Eha Rünne
- 1993: Eha Rünne
- 1994: Eha Rünne
- 1995: Eha Rünne
- 1996: Eha Rünne
- 1997: Eha Rünne
- 1998: Eha Rünne
- 1999: Eha Rünne
- 2000: Eha Rünne
- 2001: Eha Rünne
- 2002: Eha Rünne
- 2003: Eha Rünne
- 2004: Eha Rünne
- 2005: Eha Rünne
- 2006: Eha Rünne

=== Hammer throw ===
- 1997: Tiiu Küll
- 1998: Kadri-Liis Vähi
- 1999: Terje Matsik
- 2000: Kadri-Liis Vähi
- 2001: Terje Matsik
- 2002: Terje Matsik
- 2003: Maris Rõngelep
- 2004: Maris Rõngelep
- 2005: Maris Rõngelep
- 2006: Maris Rõngelep

=== Javelin throw ===
- 1991: Katrin Kirm
- 1992: Ruth Põldots
- 1993: Maret Kalviste
- 1994: Maret Kalviste
- 1995: Moonika Aava
- 1996: Moonika Aava
- 1997: Ruth Põldots
- 1998: Ruth Väät
- 1999: Ruth Väät
- 2000: Moonika Aava
- 2001: Moonika Aava
- 2002: Moonika Aava
- 2003: Jana Trakmann
- 2004: Moonika Aava
- 2005: Moonika Aava
- 2006: Jana Trakmann

=== Heptathlon ===
- 1991: Piret Rasina
- 1992: Virge Naeris
- 1993: Virge Naeris
- 1994: Virge Treiel
- 1995: Rutti Luksepp
- 1996: Rutti Luksepp
- 1997: Marge Salujõe
- 1998: Virge Naeris
- 1999: Rutti Luksepp
- 2000: Rutti Luksepp
- 2001: Moonika Kallas
- 2002: Rutti Luksepp
- 2003: Rutti Luksepp
- 2004: Gudrun Kaukver
- 2005: Ksenija Balta

=== 5000 metres walk ===
- 1991: Maia Jõemaa
- 1992: Anna-Maria Malanova
- 1993: Anneli Aru
- 1994: Natalja Ivanova
- 1995: Natalja Ivanova
- 1996: Natalja Ivanova
- 1997: Natalja Ivanova
- 1998: Natalja Ivanova
- 1999: Anneli Aru

=== 10,000 metres walk ===
- 1991: Kerli Kesküla
- 1992–1996: Not held
- 1997: Anneli Aru
- 1998: Anneli Aru
- 1999: Anneli Aru
- 2000: Kaity-Marin Tiitmaa
- 2001: Jekaterina Jutkina
- 2002: Jekaterina Jutkina
- 2003: Jekaterina Jutkina
- 2004: Svetlana Gribkova
- 2005: Jekaterina Jutkina
- 2006: Jekaterina Jutkina

=== 20 kilometres walk ===
- 2000: Kaity-Marin Tiitmaa
- 2001: Kerly Lillemets
- 2002: Jekaterina Jutkina
- 2003: Kerly Lillemets
- 2004: Maarja Rand
- 2005: Ragle Raudsepp
