= 2014 Estonian Athletics Championships =

- Edition: 97th
- Dates: 2–3 August
- Host city: Tallinn, Estonia
- Venue: Kadriorg Stadium
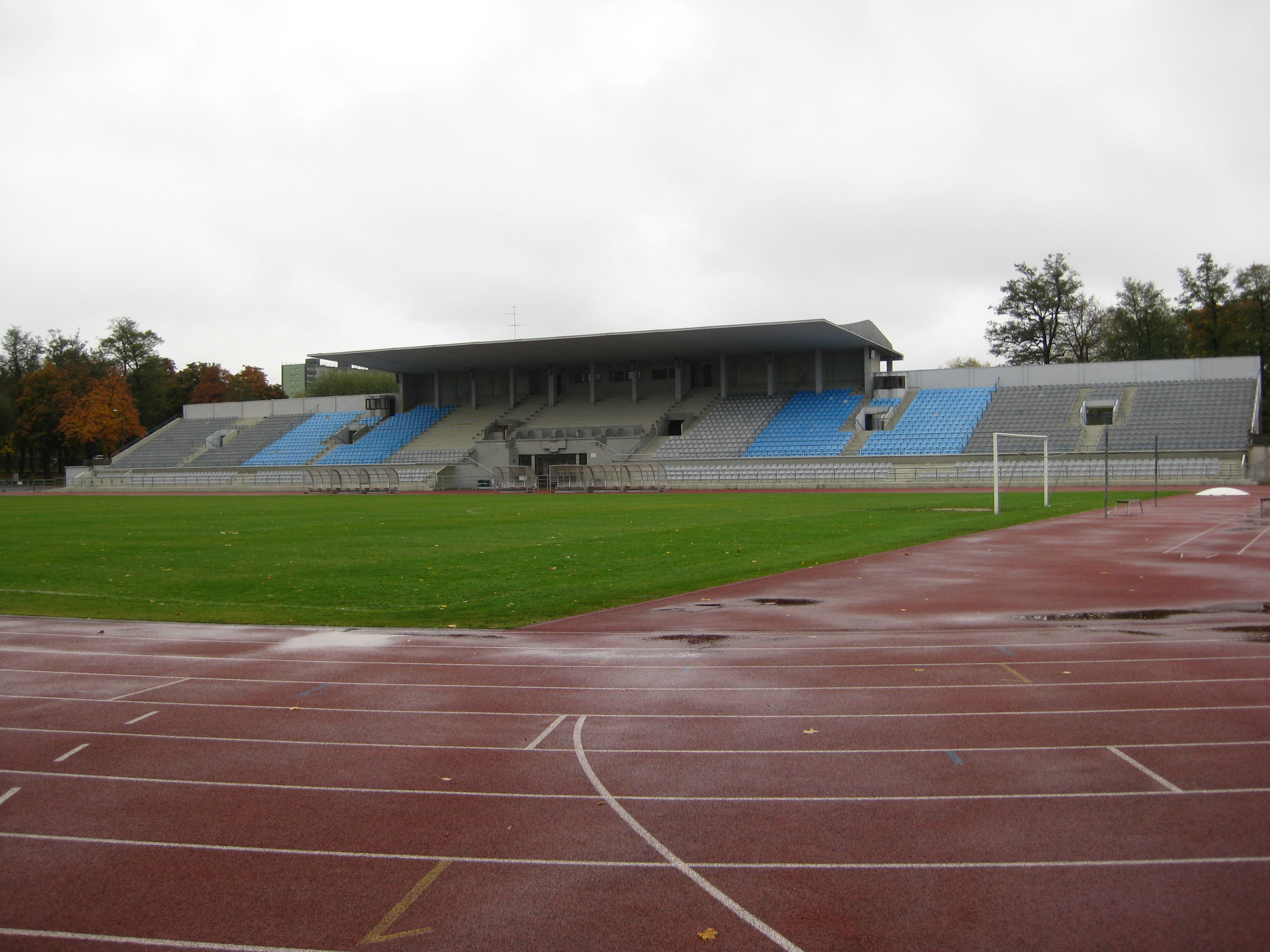
- Level: Senior
- Type: Outdoor

The 2014 Estonian Athletics Championships (Estonian: 2014. aasta Eesti meistrivõistlused kergejõustikus) was the national championship in outdoor track and field for Estonia. It was held from 2–3 August at Kadriorg Stadium in Tallinn.

== Results ==
=== Men ===
Event	Gold		Silver		Bronze	
100 metres	Rait Veesalu; SK Altius	10.95	Mart Muru; Audentese SK	10.97	Henrik Kutberg; Audentese SK	11.02
200 metres	Marek Niit; KJK Saare	20.85	Markus Ellisaar; Tartu Ü. ASK	21.99	Markus Leemet; SK Leksi 44	22.18
400 metres	Marek Niit; KJK Saare	46.39	Jaak-Heinrich Jagor; Tartu SS Kalev	48.49	Sten Ütsmüts; Tartu Ü. ASK	48.59
800 metres	Andi Noot; Tartu SS Kalev	1:50.87	Raimond Valler; Tartu Ü. ASK	1:52.16	Allar Lamp; Tartu Ü. ASK	1:52.90
1500 metres	Tiidrek Nurme; Tartu Ü. ASK	3:53.06	Allar Lamp; Tartu Ü. ASK	3:54.25	Valeri Poddevalin; Tallinna SS Kalev	4:00.89
5000 metres	Roman Fosti; Stamina SK	15:03.04	Tiidrek Nurme; Tartu Ü. ASK	15:03.05	Ivar Ivanov; KJK Lõunalõv	15:31.42
110 m hurdles	Andres Raja; KJK Lõunalõvi	14.29	Rauno Kirschbaum; SK Altius	14.42	Allar Staškevitš; KJS Sakala	14.90
400 m hurdles	Rasmus Mägi; Tartu Ü. ASK	48.77 NR	Jaak-Heinrich Jagor; Tartu SS Kalev	50.69	Georg Vladimirov; KJK Vike	53.00
3000 m s'chase	Priit Aus; Stamina SK	8:50.51	Ivar Ivanov; KJK Lõunalõvi	9:32.58	Igor Skatško; JK Tempo	10:38.74
20 km walk	Lauri Lelumees; B. Junk Käimisklubi	1:38:47.52	Margus Luik; B. Junk Käimisklubi	1:42:57.51	Ainar Veskus; KJK Kalev-Sillamäe	1:51:04.91
High jump	Hendrik Lepik; Audentese SK	2.16 m	Karl Lumi; Tallinna SS Kalev	2.13 m	Tanel Reismann; Tallinna SS Kalev	2.10 m
Pole vault	Veiko Aunapuu; KJK Vike	5.00 m	Ramo Kask; SK Leksi 44	4.90 m	Anri Mulin; SK Kivilind	4.80v
Long jump	Mihkel Saks; Tallinna SS Kalev	7.65 m	Rain Kask; EMÜ SK	7.52 m	Meelis Siimson; Audentese SK	7.45 m
Triple jump	Igor Sjunin; Tartu Ü. ASK	15.83 m	Lauri Leis; KJK Lõunalõvi	15.64 m	Tanel Reismann; KJK Järvala	15.14 m
Shot put	Kristo Galeta; KJS Sakala	18.09 m	Raido Kalbach; Tallinna SS Kalev	16.82 m	Karl Koha; Haapsalu KJK	16.48 m
Discus throw	Gerd Kanter; Tallinna SS Kalev	66.02 m	Märt Israel; Tallinna TÜ SK	62.33 m	Martin Kupper; Audentese SK	59.92 m
Hammer throw	Mart Olman; Audentese SK	64.76 m	Martin Lehemets; KJS Sakala	64.38 m	Marek Vähi; KJK Lõunalõvi	58.14 m
Javelin throw	Tanel Laanmäe; SK Viraaž	80.02 m	Magnus Kirt; Tallinna TÜ SK	76.46 m	Risto Mätas; Audentese SK	76.17 m

=== Women ===
Event	Gold		Silver		Bronze	
100 metres	Maarja Kalev; Tartu Ü. ASK	11.84	Diana Suumann; Tartu SS Kalev	12.20	Õilme Võro; KJK Lõunalõvi	12.24
200 metres	Maarja Kalev; Tartu Ü. ASK	24.51	Õilme Võro; KJK Lõunalõvi	25.03	Kreete Verlin; SK Fortis	25.67
400 metres	Maris Mägi; Tartu Ü. ASK	54.07	Helin Meier; Nõmme KJK	56.12	Liina Tšernov; SK Sportkeskus ee	57.07
800 metres	Liina Tšernov; SK Sportkeskus ee	2:07.18	Kelly Nevolihhin; KJK Vike	2:08.66	Helin Meier; Nõmme KJK	2:10.49
1500 metres	Liina Tšernov; SK Sportkeskus ee	4:29.09	Kelly Nevolihhin; KJK Vike	4:32.64	Birgit Pihelgas; Individuaalvõistleja	4:38.43
5000 metres	Jekaterina Patjuk; Tartu Ü. ASK	16:43.39	Liina Luik; Tartu Ü. ASK	16:52.57	Grete Tõnne; EMÜ SK	18:16.61
100 m hurdles	Grit Šadeiko; Tartu Ü. ASK	13.44	Mari Klaup; Tartu Ü. ASK	14.09	Kristella Jurkatamm; Audentese SK	14.27
400 m hurdles	Maris Mägi; Tartu Ü. ASK	59.79	Karmen Veerme; Tartu Ü. ASK	1:03.80	Emilija Manninen; Kurtide SL	1:03.88
3000 m s'chase	Jekaterina Patjuk; Tartu Ü. ASK	10:27.55	Evelin Talts; Stamina SK	10:49.78	Ksenia Savchenko; KJK Kalev-Sillamäe	11:50.31
10 km walk	Angela Mandel; KJK Kalev-Sillamäe	55:58.13	Anna Tipukina; KJK Atleetika	57:11.69	Anastasia Ponomarenko; KJK Kalev-Sillamäe	58:55.71
High jump	Eleriin Haas; SK Altius	1.88 m	Grete Udras; Tartu SS Kalev	1.85 m	Teele Palumaa; Tartu Ü. ASK	1.73 m
Pole vault	Reena Koll; KJK Visa	4.00 m	Lembi Vaher; Nõmme KJK	3.80 m	Getter-Marie Lemberg; Tartu Ü. ASK	3.70 m
Long jump	Grit Šadeiko; Tartu Ü. ASK	6.28 m	Kaia Soosaar; Tartu Ü. ASK	6.05 m	Kristella Jurkatamm; Audentese SK	5.99 m
Triple jump	Merilyn Uudmäe; Audentese SK	12.36 m	Marit Jukk; Tartu SS Kalev	12.29 m	Janne Liiker; Audentese SK	12.15 m
Shot put	Kätlin Piirimäe; Koigi KJK	14.92 m	Anu Teesaar; Nõmme KJK	14.12 m	Linda Treiel; KJK Saare	13.91 m
Discus throw	Kätlin Tõllasson; Tartu Ü. ASK	49.84 m	Anu Teesaar; Nõmme KJK	49.69 m	Lisette Liivrand; Pärnu Kalevi KJK	45.43 m
Hammer throw	Kati Ojaloo; KJS Sakala	63.33 m	Maris Rõngelep; Audentese SK	54.82 m	Ellina Anissimova; Tartu Ü. ASK	54.57 m
Javelin throw	Helina Karvak; Audentese SK	55.36 m	Valeria Radajeva; Audentese SK	49.44 m	Mari Klaup; Tartu Ü. ASK	47.66 m
