= Tallinn Marathon =

Annual race in Estonia since 2010

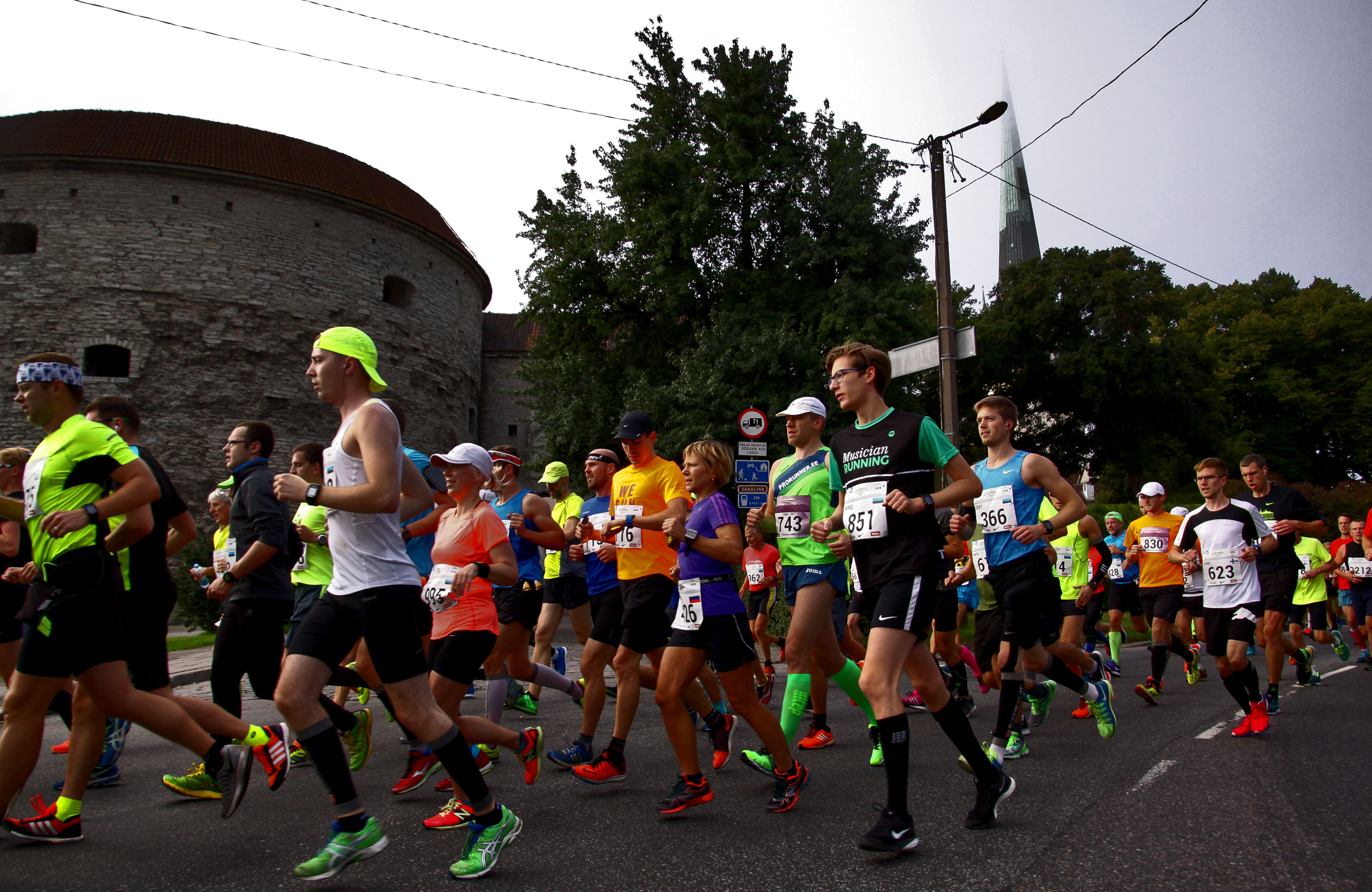
- Runners passing the Estonian Maritime Museum in the old town in 2016
- Date: September
- Location: Tallinn, Estonia
- Event type: Road
- Distance: Marathon, half marathon, 10K run, 10K Nordic walking
- Primary sponsor: Swedbank
- Established: 2010 (16 years ago) (marathon); 2000 (26 years ago) (event)
- Course records: Men's: 2:09:22 (2017) (Kenya) Kiprotich Kirui; Women's: 2:31:09 (2024) (Kenya) Mercy Kwambai
- Website: Official website
- Participants: 749 finishers (2021); 2,158 (2019)

The Tallinn Marathon is an annual road marathon, held in Tallinn, Estonia. It is held in September and is the biggest annual marathon in Estonia. Both the marathon and the half marathon held the day before are categorized as Elite Label Road Races by World Athletics.

== History ==
The first regularly-held marathon was held in 2010. Prior to this, the marathon was first held in 1989 with about 100 runners, and a half marathon and a 10 km race had been held regularly since 2000.

In 2015, Estonian Marti Medar set a world record for completing a marathon while dribbling a basketball, finishing in 3:04:15. In 2017, Medar set a world record for completing a marathon while dribbling two basketballs at the same time, doing so in 3:54:16, and then set it again in 2021 with a time of 3:36:36.

The 2020 in-person edition of the race was cancelled due to the coronavirus pandemic, with all registrants given the option of running the race virtually, transferring their entry to 2021, or obtaining a refund.

External images
- Course map of full marathon in 2019
- Course map of full marathon in 2021

== Winners ==
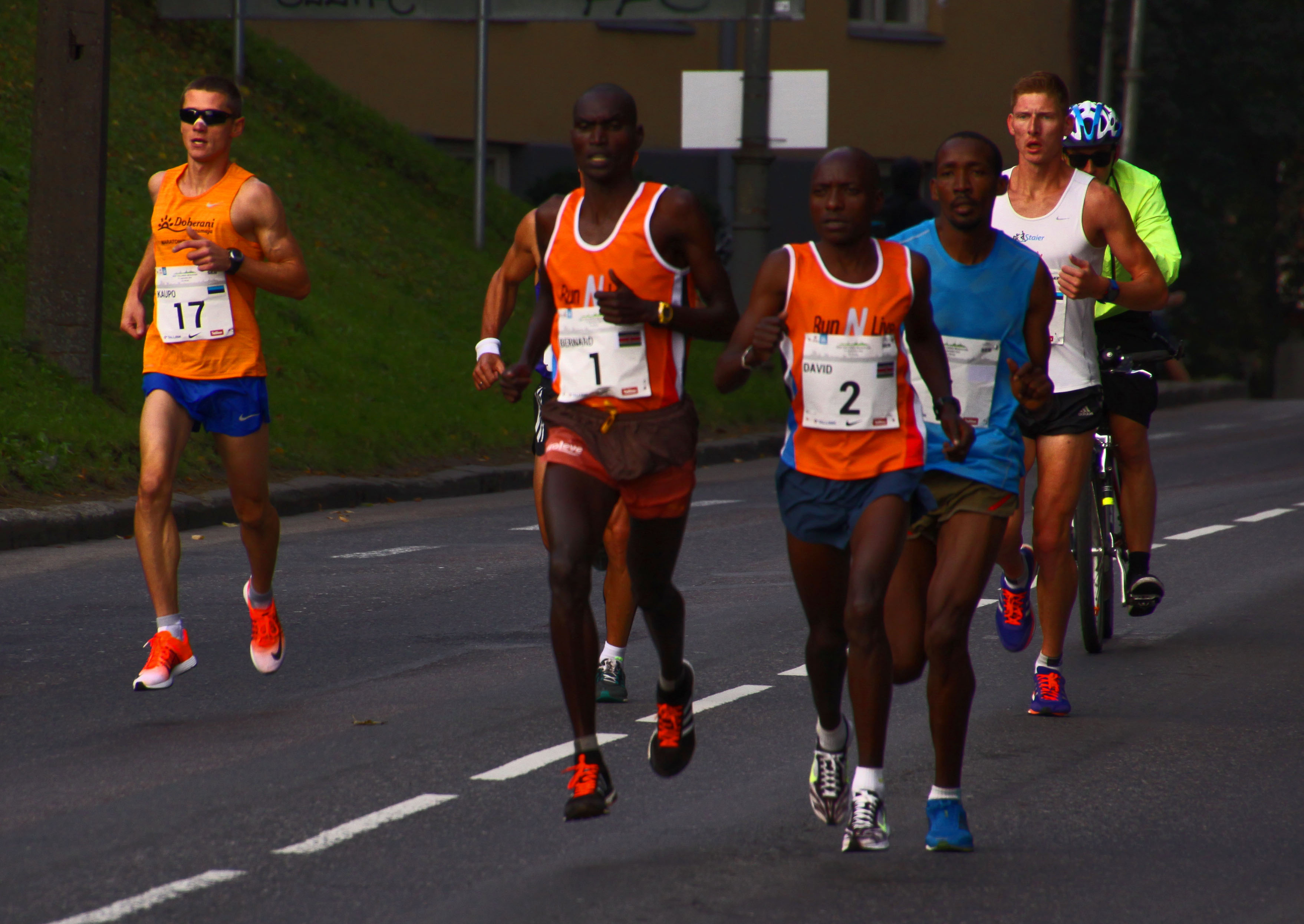
Bernard Chumba, David Ruto, and Kaupo Sasmin at the head of the marathon in 2016

Key: Course record (in bold)

=== Marathon ===
Year	Men's winner	Nationality	Time	Women's winner	Nationality	Time	Rf.
2010	Bernard Rotich	Kenya	2:18:16	Ruth Kutol	Kenya	2:36:02	
2011	Julius Muriuki	Kenya	2:12:56	Almaz Alemu	Ethiopia	2:34:14	
2012	John Kirui	Kenya	2:15:21	Evelin Talts	Estonia	2:45:02	
2013	Dadi Tesfaye	Ethiopia	2:15:01	Irene Chepkirui	Kenya	2:34:40	
2014	Dadi Tesfaye	Ethiopia	2:17:29	Evelin Talts	Estonia	2:56:26	
2015	Kiprop Tonui	Kenya	2:18:04	Kaisa Kukk	Estonia	2:52:40	
2016	Bernard Chumba	Kenya	2:20:52	Esther Karimi	Kenya	2:49:20	
2017	Kiprotich Kirui	Kenya	**2:09:22**	Olga Andrejeva	Estonia	2:51:06	
2018	Roman Fosti	Estonia	2:24:07	Daisy Langat	Kenya	2:33:50	
2019	Josphat Leting	Kenya	2:12:42	Pamela Rotich	Kenya	2:32:16	
2020	cancelled due to coronavirus pandemic						
2021	Ibrahim Mukunga	Kenya	2:30:43	Kaisa Kukk	Estonia	2:44:46	
2022	Jonathan Kiptoo	Kenya	2:12:44	Pauline Thitu	Kenya	2:31:29	
2023	Sammy Korir	Kenya	2:11:42	Ethlemahu Sintayehu	Ethiopia	2:34:04	
2024	Samwel Kiptoo	Kenya	2:13:48	Mercy Kwambai	Kenya	**2:31:09**	
2025	Fanny Kiprotich Bungei	Kenya	2:11:21	Euliter Jepchirchir Tanui	Kenya	2:32:02	

=== Half marathon ===
Year	Men's winner	Nationality	Time	Women's winner	Nationality	Time	Rf.
2000	Pavel Loskutov	Estonia	1:03:23	Živilė Balčiūnaitė	Lithuania	1:15:24	
2001	Pavel Loskutov	Estonia	1:04:29	Jeļena Prokopčuka	Latvia	1:12:57	
2002	Pavel Loskutov	Estonia	1:04:55	Liilia Kesküla	Estonia	1:28:31	
2003	Pavel Loskutov	Estonia	1:04:01	Kulli Kaljus	Estonia	1:22:13	
2004	Pavel Loskutov	Estonia	1:05:47	Kadri Kelve	Estonia	1:24:14	
2005	Pavel Loskutov	Estonia	1:04:59	Tiina Tross	Estonia	1:20:50	
2006	Vjatšeslav Košelev	Estonia	1:06:21	Sigrid Valdre	Estonia	1:19:29	
2007	Pavel Loskutov	Estonia	1:06:22	Sigrid Valdre	Estonia	1:19:03	
2008	Alexei Markov	Estonia	1:08:24	Remalda Kergytė	Lithuania	1:17:13	
2009	Mareks Florošeks	Latvia	1:07:34	Rasa Drazdauskaitė	Lithuania	1:12:54	
2010	not held						
2011	Valērijs Žolnerovičs	Latvia	1:07:97	Inna Poluškina	Latvia	1:17:27	
2012	Jānis Girgensons	Latvia	1:06:32	Ilona Marhele	Latvia	1:16:39	
2013	Ibrahim Mukunga	Kenya	1:05:42	Jekaterina Patjuk	Estonia	1:17:32	
2014	Jacob Yator	Kenya	1:05:36	Jeļena Prokopčuka	Latvia	1:12:28	
2015	Tiidrek Nurme	Estonia	1:06:08	Ilona Marhele	Latvia	1:18:35	
2016	Victor Ketienya	Kenya	1:06:58	Ilona Marhele	Latvia	1:17:08	
2017	Benard Korir	Kenya	1:04:44	Jekaterina Patjuk	Estonia	1:15:17	
2018	Tiidrek Nurme	Estonia	1:03:27	Norah Chebet	Kenya	1:12:56	
2019	Evans Cheruiyot	Kenya	1:00:29	Janet Ruguru	Kenya	1:10:19	
2020	cancelled due to coronavirus pandemic						
2021	Tiidrek Nurme	Estonia	1:05:39	Helena Peik	Estonia	1:24:11	
2022	Roman Fosti	Estonia	1:06:39	Soukaina Atanane	Morocco	1:14:55	
2023	Ali Chebures	Uganda	1:01:35	Beatrice Cheserek	Kenya	**1:08:22**	
2024	Collins Kipkorir	Kenya	**1:00:23**	Helah Kiprop	Kenya	1:09:20	
2025	Asabel Kiplimo Naiboi	Kenya	1:01:39	Gladys Jepkemoi Kwambai	Kenya	1:10:59	

=== 10 kilometers ===
Year	Men's winner	Nationality	Time	Women's winner	Nationality	Time	Rf.
2000	Toomas Tarm	Estonia	30:27	Maile Mangusson	Estonia	36:14	
2001	Vjatšeslav Košelev	Estonia	30:17	Maile Mangusson	Estonia	35:59	
2002	Vjatšeslav Košelev	Estonia	31:03	Maile Mangusson	Estonia	38:03	
2003	Egidijus Rupšys	Lithuania	30:57	Maile Mangusson	Estonia	37:26	
2004	Margus Pirksaar	Estonia	31:21	Gailutė Keliuotienė	Lithuania	38:52	
2005	Margus Pirksaar	Estonia	31:11	Inga Jedeskiene	Lithuania	35:55	
2006	Tiidrek Nurme	Estonia	30:38	Daniela Fetcera	Latvia	34:56	
2007	Mareks Florošeks	Latvia	31:29	Daniela Fetcera	Latvia	34:38	
2008	Mareks Florošeks	Latvia	31:10	Rasa Drazdauskaitė	Lithuania	34:18	
2009	Tiidrek Nurme	Estonia	30:04	Inna Poluškina	Latvia	34:38	
2010	Tiidrek Nurme	Estonia	30:04	Inna Poluškina	Latvia	34:19	
2011	Tiidrek Nurme	Estonia	30:34	Jekaterina Patjuk	Estonia	34:28	
2012	Tiidrek Nurme	Estonia	30:06	Rasa Drazdauskaitė	Lithuania	35:10	
2013	David Kogei	Kenya	**29:02**	Jeļena Prokopčuka	Latvia	33:18	
2014	Tiidrek Nurme	Estonia	29:47	Lily Luik	Estonia	36:24	
2015	Roman Fosti	Estonia	30:11	Jekaterina Patjuk	Estonia	33:51	
2016	Tiidrek Nurme	Estonia	29:42	Liina Tšernov	Estonia	34:56	
2017	Benard Korir	Kenya	29:46	Liina Tšernov	Estonia	35:49	
2018	Weldom Kerich	Kenya	30:15	Norah Chebet	Kenya	34:05	
2019	Vasyl Koval	Ukraine	30:10	Liina Tšernov	Estonia	34:20	
2020	cancelled due to coronavirus pandemic						
2021	Kaur Kivistik	Estonia	30:24	Liina Luik	Estonia	36:09	
2022	Tiidrek Nurme	Estonia	29:39	Soukaina Atanane	Morocco	33:11	
2023	Tiidrek Nurme	Estonia	29:31	Laura Maasik	Estonia	34:46	
2024	Deniss Šalkauskas	Estonia	31:01	Agate Caune	Latvia	**32:09**	
2025	Dmitrijs Serjogins	Latvia	29:39	Chloe Dooley	United Kingdom	36:04	

== See also ==
- List of marathon races in Europe
