= Veljo =

Male given name

- Gender: Male
- Language: Estonian
- Name day: 9 January

Origin
- Region of origin: Estonia

Other names
- Derived: from the Estonian veli, meaning "brother"
- Related names: Väiko, Veigo, Veiko, Veli, Vello, Velvo, Viljo

Veljo is an Estonian masculine given name, possibly a local diminutive of the given name Villem, or derived from the Estonian language word veli, meaning "brother".

As of 1 January 2021, 476 men in Estonia have the first name Veljo, making it the 280th most popular male name in the country. The name is most common in the 45-49 age group, where 8.75 per 10,000 inhabitants bear the name. The name is most commonly found in Saare County, where 12.50 per 10,000 inhabitants of the county bear the name.

Individuals bearing the name Veljo include:

- Veljo Kaasik (born 1938), architect
- Veljo Käsper (1930–1982), film director
- Veljo Lamp (born 1968), competitive runner
- Veljo Reinik (born 1981), actor
- Veljo Tormis (1930–2017), composer
