= Viljo =

Male given name

- Gender: Male
- Name day: 5 June

Origin
- Region of origin: Estonia, Finland

Other names
- Related names: Villu, Ville, Vili, Viljar, Viljami, Villem, Veljo

Viljo is an Estonian and Finnish masculine given name and may refer to:

- Viljo Halme (1907–1981), Finnish footballer
- Viljo Heino (1914–1998), Finnish track and field athlete and 1948 Olympic competitor
- Viljo Kajava (1909–1998), Finnish poet and writer
- Viljo Nousiainen (1944–1999), Swedish athletics coach
- Viljo Revell (1910–1964), Finnish architect
- Viljo Rosvall (1898–1929), Finnish-born Canadian unionist
- Viljo Tuompo (1893–1957), Finnish military Major General and Lieutenant General
- Viljo Vellonen (1920–1995), Finnish cross country skier
- Viljo Vesterinen (1907–1961), Finnish accordionist and composer
- Viljo Wirkkunen (1928–1986), Finnish-Canadian ice hockey coach
