= Karl Laas =

Karl Laas may refer to:

- Karl Laas (runner)
- Karl Laas (actor)
