= Villu =

Villu may refer to:

- Villu (given name), an Estonian masculine given name
- Villu (film), a 2009 Indian Tamil film starring Vijay
- Hari Villu, a 2003 Indian Telugu film
- Onavillu, a simple, short bow-shaped musical instrument
- Villu Paatu (or 'Bow Song'), an ancient form of musical story-telling art of South Kerala and Tamil Nadu
- Viluppuram (also spelled Villupuram), a district and town in Tamil Nadu, India
