= Tiia Eeskivi =

Estonian athletics competitor

Tiia Eeskivi (born 22 September 1969) is an Estonian athletics competitor.

She was born in Pärnu. In 1988 she graduated from Estonian Sports Gymnasium (TSIK), and in 1992 from the Tallinn Pedagogical Institute's Faculty of Physical Education.

She began sporting in 1977, focusing on athletics in 1983, coached by Linda Rannap. Later her coaches were Epp Lumiste and Uno Källe. She competed at European Athletics Championships, finished 21st in 400 m hurdles. She is multiple-times Estonian champion in different running disciplines. 1986–1999 she was a member of Estonian national athletics team.
