= Heiki Sarapuu =

Estonian athletics competitor

Personal information
- Nationality: Estonian
- Born: 11 December 1965 (age 60) Valga, then part of Estonian SSR, Soviet Union
- Education: Tallinn University
- Years active: 1984-2001
- Height: 189 cm (6 ft 2 in)

Sport
- Country: Estonia

Heiki Sarapuu (born 11 December 1965) is a retired Estonian athletics competitor.

== Early life and politics ==
Sarapuu was born in Valga, a town in southern Estonia. He started his training under will of his father, who was a physical education teacher. His training began with his school coach, Raimond Luts. Later, Sarapuu would work with coaches: Olav Karikosk, Toomas Turb, and Meelis Minn.

In 1991, he graduated from Tallinn Pedagogical Institute's Faculty of Physical Education. Concurrently, he began working as a physical education teacher at Tallinn School of Transportation. In 1995, he took a position at the Ülenurme Gymnasium

In 2009, Sarapuu was elected to the Ülenurme municipal council from the Meie Kodu party. Four years later, he won re-election, running on the list of the Estonian Reform Party. In 2017, the municipality was merged with Kambja municipality as a result of administrative reform, and Sarapuu was re-elected to the council of the newly-merged municipality. Following the reform, he ran under the ERP and maintained his seat. In 2021, he won re-elected from the Hoiame Head electoral coalition list. Throughout his tenure, he served as chairman of the municipal council. Since 2013, he has been a member of the board of directors of the Tartumaa Spordiliit (Sports Association of Tartu Province).

== Career ==
Sarapuu has competed at the IAAF World Cross Country Championships. He is a multi-time Estonian champion in different running disciplines. From 1984–2001, he was a member of Estonian national athletics team.

He won the silver medal at the Baltic Games with a time of 14:44.52. He competed at the 1994 IAAF World Half Marathon Championships, where he placed 108th individually (1:08:38), and in 22nd place (3:19:55) under the Estonian team. He also competed in the 1997 IAAF World Cross Country Championships, where he placed 194th individually, and 23rd as a team. The following year, he placed 123rd individually and 23rd as a team. In 1999, 2000 and 2001, he competed at a shorter distance and placed 89th, 129th and 114th, respectively.

Sarapuu also competed domestically, as he is a 9-time Estonian cross country champion, winning in 1989-1990, 1992-1993, and in 1996-2000. He is a 3 time runner up, in 1988, 1995, and 2003, and for the 4km in 2001, and was a bronze medalist in 1987 and 1991.

In addition to his competition in the cross country championships, Sarapuu is also the Estonian half marathon champion in 1994; the 10k champion in 1989, 1990, and 1992; the 5k champion in 1989, 1996, and 1997; and the 1.5k champion from 1996. Sarapuu also won the 1997 Lõppes jooksjate 10k held by Estonian sporting organization Nõmme KJK. He was the Estonian runner-up in the 4 x 100m relay in 1984, 1991, 1994, 2000, and 2002; the 5k run in 1990, 1998, and 1999; the 10k run in 1991 and 1994, the 3k run in 1998, 1992, and 1995-1998; and the 1.5k run in 1998. He is additionally a bronze medalist from the Estonian championships in the 3k run from 1987, 1990, 1994, and 2001; the 5k run of 1992, 1994, and 2000; the 10k run of 1993; and the 4 x 1.5k relay of 1993 and 1996.

Although currently retired from sports, Sarapuu currently participates in skiing and biking races.

=== Personal bests ===
- 1500 m: 3:50.01 (1989)
- 3000 m (indoors): 8:24.75 (Panevėžys, 15 February 1997)
- 5000 m: 14:21.86 (Tallinn, 26 May 1996)
- 10 000 m: 29:43.53 (Tampere, 2 July 1995)
- Half-marathon: 1:08.20 (Forssa, 17 June 1995)
