= Athletics at the 1981 Summer Universiade – Men's 10,000 metres =

The men's 10,000 metres event at the 1981 Summer Universiade was held at the Stadionul Naţional in Bucharest on 21 July 1981. The times are unofficial as, due to the officials' error, the athletes ran one extra lap, making the race 10,400 metres in total.

== Results ==
Rank	Athlete	Nationality	Time	Notes
1st place, gold medalist(s)	Toomas Turb	Soviet Union	29:42.83	
2nd place, silver medalist(s)	Gyorgi Marko	Romania	29:51.13	
3rd place, bronze medalist(s)	Dave Murphy	Great Britain	29:51.27	
4	Mehmet Yurdadön	Turkey	29:53.86	
5	Mike Cotton	United States	29:59.43	
6	Alessio Faustini	Italy	30:02.20	
7	Shinobu Murakoshi	Japan	30:12.69	
8	Vicente Polo	Spain	30:25.86	
9	Aurel Niculescu	Romania	30:29.26	
10	Yutaka Kanai	Japan	30:29.60	
11	Mehmet Terzi	Turkey	30:32.49	
12	Vladimir Sýkora	Czechoslovakia	30:43.42	
13	Marcus Nenow	United States	31:04.48	
14	Yevgeniy Okorokov	Soviet Union	31:10.39	
15	Francisco Pacheco	Mexico	31:32.63	
16	Shane Marshall	New Zealand	31:37.78	
17	Rumen Mekhandzhinski	Bulgaria	31:41.61	
18	Gerardo Alcalá	Mexico	31:59.38	
19	Nabil Chouéri	Lebanon	32:12.84	
	Petko Karpachev	Bulgaria	DNF	
	Pertti Tiainen	Finland	DNF	
