= Kertu Tiitso =

Estonian athletics competitor

Personal information
- Born: 6 February 1971 (age 55) Rapla, Soviet Union

Sport
- Sport: Track and field

Kertu Tiitso (born 6 February 1971) is an Estonian athletics competitor.

She was born in Rapla. In 1990 she graduated from Estonian Sports Gymnasium (TSIK), 1994 Tallinn Pedagogical Institute's Faculty of Physical Education, and 2004 University Nord.

She began athletics training in 1980, coached by Vambola Poljakov. Later her coaches were Jaan Pelmas, Milvi Torim, Uno Källe and Sven Andresoo. She has competed at European Athletics Indoor Championships. She is 22-times Estonian champion in different athletics disciplines. 1992–1998 she was a member of Estonian national athletics team.
