= Sirje Eichelmann =

Estonian athletics competitor

Sirje Eichelmann (until 1976 Kirs, 1976–1979 Alev; 16 July 1955) is an Estonian athletics competitor.

She was born in Viljandi.

She began athletics training under the guidance of Harry Seinberg. Since 1987 her coach was Uno Källe. She is multiple-times Estonian champion in different running disciplines. 1976–1993 she was a member of Estonian national athletics team.

Since 2006 she has practised golf, in 2014 and 2019 she won bronze medals at Estonian championships.

Personal best:

- 800 m: 2.06,2 (1988)
- 1500 m: 4.15,4 (1988)
- 3000 m: 8.57,56 (1988)
- 5000 m: 16.03,57 (1989)
