= Enn Lilienthal =

Estonian athletics competitor

Enn Lilienthal (born 9 September 1962) is an Estonian athletics competitor.

He was born in Tartu. In 1986 he graduated from the University of Tartu's Institute of Physical Education.

He began athletics training in 1977, coached by Andres Nirk. Later his coaches were Enno Akkel, and 1982–1993 Martin Kutman. He is multiple-time Estonian champion in different running disciplines. 1984–1991 he was a member of Estonian national athletics team.

Personal best:

- 100 m: 10,60 (1990)
- 200 m: 21,64 (1989)
