= Viljar =

Male given name

- Gender: Male
- Language: Estonian, Norse
- Name day: 5 June

Origin
- Region of origin: Estonia, Norway, Iceland

Other names
- Related names: Villem, Viljo, Vilja, Vilimo, Viljer, Vilju, Wiljar

Viljar is both an Estonian and an Old Norse masculine given name. Its Estonian meaning is "grow" or "nourishment", whereas the Old Norse version of the name means "willing warrior".

People named Viljar include:

- Viljar Ansko (1948– 2016), Estonian physician, poet and caricaturist
- Viljar Loor (1953–2011), Estonian volleyball player
- Viljar Myhra (born 1996), Norwegian footballer
- Viljar Peep (born 1969), Estonian historian and civil servant
- Viljar Schiff (born 1974), Estonian military personnel
- Viljar Veski (born 1986), Estonian basketball player
- Viljar Vevatne (born 1994), Norwegian footballer
