= Kalju Jurkatamm =

Estonian athletics competitor (1941–2024)

Kalju Jurkatamm (27 September 1941 – 23 February 2024) was an Estonian sprinter.

== Biography ==
Kalju Jurkatamm was born in Tallinn on 27 September 1941. In 1966 he graduated from Tartu State University in mathematics.

Jurkatamm began athletics training in 1956, coached by Jaan Pälling. Since 1960 his coach was Hans Torim. 1964–1971 he won eight medals at Soviet Union championships. He was multiple-time Estonian champion in different athletics disciplines. 1969 he was a member of Soviet Union national athletics team. 1961–1971 he was a member of Estonian national athletics team.

Jurkatamm died on 23 February 2024, at the age of 82.
