= Rein Valdmaa =

Estonian athletics competitor

Rein Valdmaa (born 19 November 1960) is an Estonian athletics competitor.

He was born in Elva. In 1980 he graduated from Estonian Sports Gymnasium (TSIK).

He started his athletics exercising in 1972 in Lähte High School, coached by Harry Meier. Later he specialised on long-distance running, coached by Manfred Tõnisson, Heiti Lumiste ja Uno Källe. He is multiple-times Estonian champion. 1982–1995 he was a member of Estonian national athletics team.

Personal best:

- 1500 m: 3.48,6 (1983)
- 3000 m: 8.09,52 (1983)
- 5000 m: 13.48,56 (1983)
- 10 000 m: 29.01,38
- marathon: 2:18.22 (1988)
