= Vello =

Male given name

- Gender: Male
- Language: Estonian

Origin
- Region of origin: Estonia

Vello is an Estonian masculine given name. People named Vello include:

- Vello Asi (1927–2016), interior architect, graphic designer and professor
- Vello Helk (1923–2014), Danish historian of Estonian origin
- Vello Jaaska (born 1936), Estonian botanist
- Vello Jürna (1959–2007), opera singer
- Vello Kaaristo (1911–1965), cross-country skier
- Vello Lään (1937–2022), journalist
- Vello Leito (born 1941), politician
- Vello Lõugas (1937–1998), archaeologist
- Vello Orumets (1941–2012), singer
- Vello Õunpuu (1943–2021), rally driver
- Vello Pähn (born 1958), conductor
- Vello Pärnpuu (born 1973), wrestler
- Vello Rummo (1921–2009), theatre director
- Vello Saatpalu (1935–2013), engineer, politician and sport sailor
- Vello Salo (1925–2019), clergyman, theologist, writer and translator
- Vello Salum (1933–2015), Lutheran clergyman, Soviet dissident and politician
- Vello Tafenau (born 1952), Estonian politician
- Vello Toomemets (born 1954), musician and composer
- Vello Väärtnõu (born 1951), Buddhist, artist and freedom fighter
- Vello Vare (1923–2007), Soviet military commander
- Vello Viisimaa (1928–1991), opera singer and actor
- Vello Vinn (born 1939), printmaker and artist

== Other uses ==
- VELLO is the brand name of a bicycle from Vienna, Austria.
- Vello is the brand name of an online booking and patient management system from Finland.

== See also ==
- Santhara Vello (born 1972), Malaysian cricketer
