= Martin Kutman =

Estonian sport coach

Martin Kutman (2009)

Martin Kutman (12 July 1928 – 29 May 2012 Tartu) was an Estonian athletics competitor and sport coach.

He was born in Estonka village, Abkhazia. In 1946 he graduated from Tbilisi Physical Education school.

1953–1958 he won 3 gold and 3 silver medal at Estonian championships in track-and-field athletics.

1952–2012 he taught at Tartu University's Institute of Physical Education.

Students: Enn Lilienthal, Ramon Kaju, Anna Iljuštšenko.

Awards:

- 1978 Merited Coach of Estonian SSR
- 2008 national life-time award in sport (Estonian: riiklik spordi elutööpreemia)
