= Meelis Veilberg =

Estonian athletics competitor

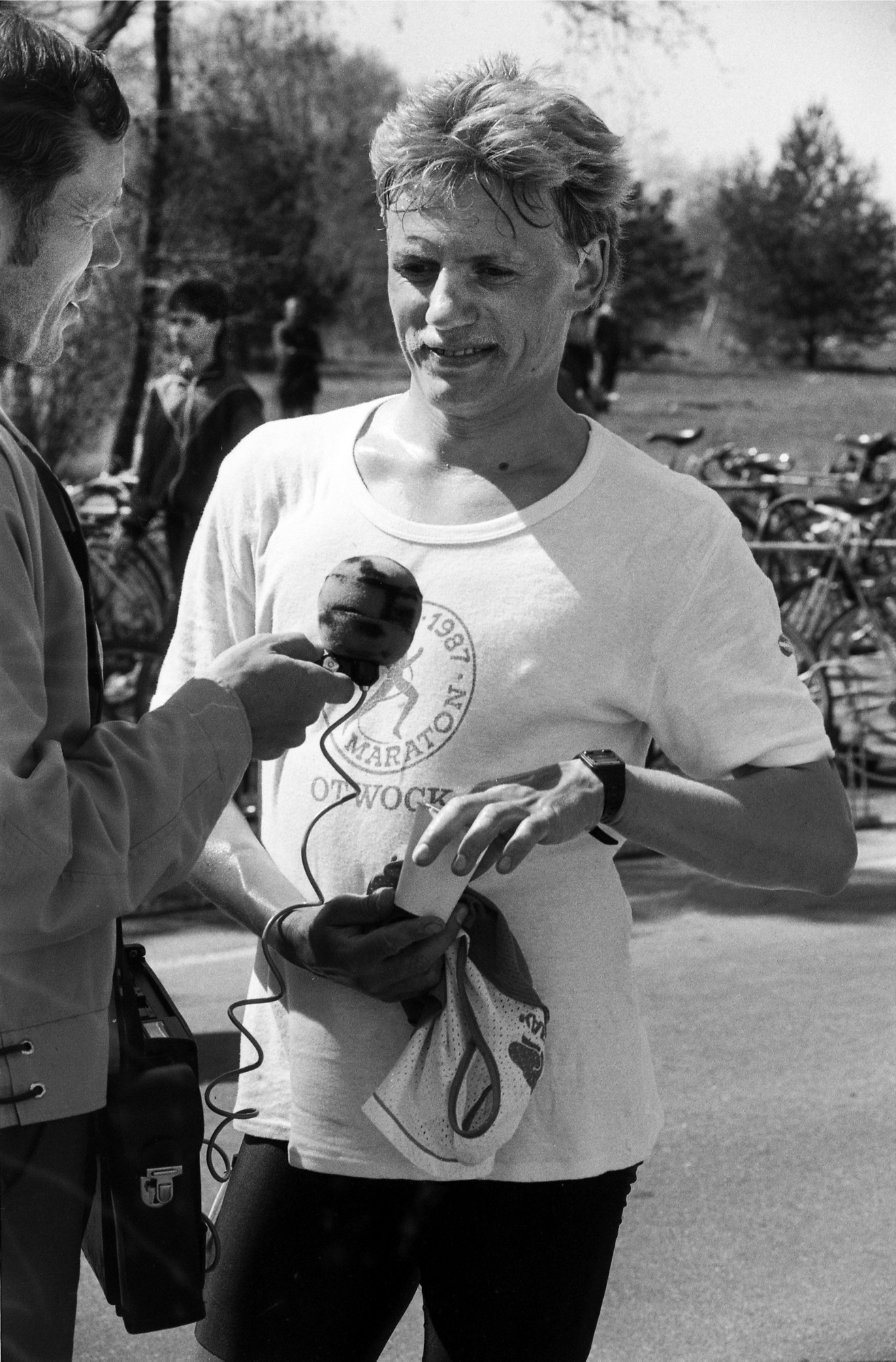
Meelis Veilberg

Meelis Veilberg (born 11 March 1961) is an Estonian athlete. He was born in Paide.

He started training when he was 17, coached by Leonhard Soom. His later coaches were Arvo Orupõld and Uno Källe. He focused on long-distance running. He is a multiple-time Estonian champion in various running events.

Records:

- 1500 m: 3.54,0 (1983)
- 5000 m: 14.22,1 (1983)
- 10 000 m: 30.01,95 (1993)
