= Urmet Uusorg =

Estonian athletics competitor

Personal information
- Born: 27 September 1976 (age 50) Nõva, Lääne County, Soviet Union

Sport
- Sport: Athletics

Urmet Uusorg (born 27 September 1976) is an Estonian athletics competitor.

== Biography ==
He was born in Nõva, Lääne County. He studied at Tallinn Pedagogical Institute's Faculty of Physical Education.

He began athletics training in 1990, coached by Peeter Kallas. He is multiple-time Estonian champion in different running disciplines. He has represented Estonian national athletics team 21 times.

According to World Athletics, he is a National Champion on eight occasions and a National Indoor Champion on five occasions.

His daughter Mia Mireia Uusorg is also an athlete.

Personal best:

- 200 m: 21,85 (with wind 21,69)
- 400 m: 47,08

Urmet's 2000 season best is listed in the table below:

Discipline	Performance	Wind	Date	Score	Competition & Venue
800 Metres	1:48.03		14 JUL 2002	1083	Lapinlahti Savo Games, Lapinlahti (FIN)
800 Metres Short Track	1:52.51		23 FEB 2002	1008	Tallinn FIN-Baltic States Indoor Match, Tallinn (EST) (i)
400 Metres	47.94		15 JUN 2002	984	Estonian Championships, Tallinn (EST)
