= Mart Paama =

Estonian javelin thrower

Personal information
- Nationality: Estonian
- Born: 17 January 1938 Tartu, Estonia
- Died: 29 June 2006 (aged 68) Tartu, Estonia

Sport
- Sport: Athletics
- Event: Javelin throw

Mart Paama (17 January 1938 – 29 June 2006) was an Estonian track and field athlete. He competed in the men's javelin throw at the 1960 Summer Olympics and the 1968 Summer Olympics, representing the Soviet Union.
