= Külli Kaljus =

Estonian orienteer and athletics competitor

Külli Kaljus (since 2004 Pirksaar; born 22 January 1973) is an Estonian orienteer and athletics competitor.

She was born in Toila. In 1995 she graduated from University of Tartu in geography.

She began her orienteering career in 1983, coached by Elli Saal (until 1989), and then coached by Tõnu Raid. She is competed at World Orienteering Championships. She won medals at Soviet Union orienteering championships. She is multiple-times Estonian champion in different orienteering disciplines. 1988–2001 she was a member of Estonian national orienteering team.

Since 1996 she competed also in athletics. Her coach was Harry Lemberg. She focused on longer distances. 1997–2002 she was a member of Estonian national athletics team.

Personal best:

- 1500 m: 4.32,77 (2001)
- 3000 m: 9.31,06 (2000)
- 5000 m: 16.14,47 (2001)
- half marathon: 1:14.24 (2001)
- marathon: 2:35.54 (2001)
