= Emilija Manninen =

Estonian hurdler

Personal information
- Full name: Emilija Manninen
- Born: Emilija Potšepko; 22 January 1981 (age 45)

Sport
- Country: Estonia
- Sport: hurdles
Medal record
Women's Athletics
Representing Estonia
Deaflympics
Gold medal – first place	Sofia 2013	400m hurdles
Silver medal – second place	Taipei 2009	400m hurdles
Bronze medal – third place	Rome 2001	400m hurdles
Bronze medal – third place	Rome 2001	4×400m relay
Bronze medal – third place	Taipei 2009	4×100m relay

Emilija Manninen (born 22 January 1981) is an Estonian female hurdler. She has represented Estonia at the Deaflympics in 1997, 2001, 2005, 2009 and 2013.

Emilija won her first Deaflympic medal, which was a bronze medal at the 2001 Summer Deaflympics in the women's 400m hurdles. She also claimed a silver medal in the 400m hurdles during the 2009 Summer Deaflympics, which was her second medal in the women's 400m hurdles. Emilija Manninen set a new Deaflympic record for the women's 400m hurdles with a record time of 1:01.62 during the 2013 Summer Deaflympics after earning a gold medal in the particular event.
