= Heino Lipp =

Estonian decathlete

Heino Lipp (June 21, 1922 – August 28, 2006) was an Estonian athlete, who was one of the greatest decathlete in the decade of the 1940s, but he was never able to compete in the Olympic Games, because citizens of the Soviet Union were never allowed to travel outside the Soviet Union dominated Iron Curtain countries. He also competed in the shot put, making 6 European records in the event.

== Career ==
Heino Lipp, born in Erra Parish (now Lüganuse Parish) near Kiviõli, Estonia was one of the great decathletes in history, but all his achievements have been obscured in the era of the Cold War politics. He was an Estonian, whose family were prominent advocates of Estonian sovereignty and brother was deemed a disloyal Estonian nationalist and was eventually murdered in a camp in Siberia. Therefore, Lipp was kept as a political prisoner and was periodically jailed by Soviet authorities. He was also not allowed to travel outside the Soviet Union.

In 1948 Track & Field News ranked him No. 1 in the T&FN World Rankings in decathlon. Four days after Bob Mathias won the 1948 Olympic decathlon with a total 7,139 points, Lipp, produced a decathlon score considerably higher than that of Mathias, scored 7,584 at a meeting in Tartu, Estonia and month after Olympics scored personal record 7,780 points in Kharkiv.

Lipp's achievement, however, was discounted or disbelieved in the West, because the Iron Curtain policies of Joseph Stalin did not allow foreign observers, so there was no way to verify the results. The West never saw Lipp perform, and neither did Soviet bloc countries other than the USSR. Lipp, for example, was not allowed to travel to Budapest for the World University Games in 1949. Photos of the physically imposing Lipp were done in the style of the superman image of the new Soviet man, a Stakhanovite.

In 1951 the Soviet Union joined the Olympic movement and participated in the 1952 Summer Olympics. Lipp's absence from the games was explained by the Soviet press as being due to “illness”. The real story is that the KGB had vetoed Lipp's participation in the Olympics even though it was short distance away in Helsinki, Finland. Competing in 1952, he probably would not have challenged eventual gold-medal winner Mathias, but a silver medal was well within the range of possibility. (Lipp's training was hampered when his scholarship was revoked in another Estonian repression in 1950, and he had to stalk deer and track small game animals daily to sustain himself.)

Lipp was a Soviet champion 12 times and set 13 national records, and never gave the Soviet regime any cause of concern, yet his “suspect” family made him a “political unreliable” to the authorities.

After Estonia broke from the Soviets in early 1990s Lipp came to United States for a Goodwill Games in Seattle as a guest of the US Chamber of Commerce.

He was out of favour with the authorities and did not get his chance to appear on an international stage until Barcelona when, at the age of 76, he proudly carried the Estonian flag at the opening ceremony of the 1992 Summer Olympics.

== T&FN world rankings ==
- Decathlon: 1947 – 2nd, 1948 – 1st, 1949 – 2nd, 1950 – 4th, 1953 – 4th
- Shot put: 1947 – 1st, 1948 – 5th, 1949 – 7th, 1950 – 3 rd, 1951 – 3rd, 1952 – 9th, 1953 – 10th
- Discus throw: 1947 – 5th, 1948 – 5th,

== Records ==
European shot put records

- 16.66 24 May 1947 Tartu
- 16.72 7 July 1947 Tartu
- 16.73 3 September 1947 Kharkiv
- 16.93 6 August 1950 Moscow
- 16.95 17 June 1951 Põltsamaa
- 16.98 7 September 1951 Minsk

Estonian decathlon records (points table since 1936)

- 6631 1946 Tartu (11,2 – 6.23 – 14.72 – 1.65 – 53,3 – 15,6 – 38.90 – 3.10 – 50.06 – 5.04,8 )
- 7097 1947 Tallinn (11,5 – 6.08 – 15.50 – 1.65 – 51,2 – 15,6 – 45.44 – 3.10 – 52.59 – 4.42,6)
- 7584 1948 Tartu (11,3 – 6.40 – 16.04 – 1.70 – 51,7 – 15,4 – 46.78 – 3.40 – 59.07 – 4.49,4)
- 7780 (7072 points table since 1985) 11 September 1948 Kharkiv (11,4 – 6.13 – 16.18 – 1.70 – 50,2 – 15,4 – 47.55 – 3.40 – 61.96 – 4.35,0)

Estonian discus throw records

- 49.41 5 September 1947 Kharkiv
- 49.50 31 July 1947 Tartu
- 52.18 29 August 1948 Moscow

Personal records

- 100 m – 11,0s; long jump – 6,53m; shot put – 16.98m; high jump – 1,72m; 400 m – 50,2s; 110 m hurdles – 15,0s; discus throw – 52.18m; pole vault – 3.40m; javelin throw – 61.96m; 1,500 m – 4.33,2; decathlon – 7780p

== Awards ==
- 1954 USSR Master of Sports
- 1965 USSR Master of Sports of International Class
- 1991 Honorary member of Estonian Olympic Committee
- 1992 Estonian Olympic team flag bearer at the Opening ceremony of the 1992 Summer Olympics in Barcelona
- 1998 Order of the White Star 3 class
- 1999 City of Tallinn Medal
