= Johannes Villemson =

Estonian runner

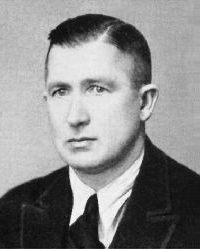

Personal information
- Born: 25 March 1893 Tallinn, Russian Empire
- Died: 22 March 1971 (aged 77) Chicago, Illinois, U.S.
- Height: 174 cm (5 ft 9 in)
- Weight: 71 kg (157 lb)

Sport
- Sport: Athletics
- Event: 100–1500 m
- Club: Estonian Sports Association Kalev

Achievements and titles
- Personal bests: 60 m – 7.1 (1917); 100 m – 11.0 (1917); 200 m – 23.4 (1917); 400 m – 52.3 (1917); 800 m – 1:59.3 (1922); 1500 m – 4:11.0 (1917)

Johannes Leopold Villemson (25 March 1893 – 22 March 1971) was an Estonian runner who competed at the 1920 Summer Olympics. He was eliminated in the first round of the 800 m and 1500 m events.

At school, Villemson focused on accounting and foreign languages. He started as a speed skater in 1909 but later changed to running and won three consecutive Russian 1500 m titles in 1914–16, placing second-third over 400 m and 800 m and setting multiple Russian records in 800–1500 m events. Later, between 1917 and 1930, he won more than 20 Estonian titles over 100–1500 m distances. He was representative for the 1924, 1928 and 1936 Estonian Olympic teams and served as a wrestling judge at these games. Between 1920 and 1940, he also took various administrative posts in Estonian athletics and wrestling bodies. In 1944, following the Soviet occupation of Estonia, he fled to Germany and then to the United States, arriving there in 1949. He worked in Chicago as a controller at an electrical appliances factory and for many years headed the Estonian Society.
