= Ain Evard =

Estonian high jumper

Ain Evard (born 22 June 1962) is a former Estonian high jumper who represented the Soviet Union and Estonia. His personal best equals to 2.25, jumped on 2 June 1985 in Riga. He is a 17-time Estonian champion (outdoor 1981–1982, 1985–1994; indoor 1982–1984, 1988, 1992).

He was born in Jõgeva.
