= Elmar Rähn =

Estonian decathlete

Personal information
- Full name: Elmar Emil Rähn
- Nationality: Estonian
- Born: 3 December 1904 Tartu, Governorate of Livonia, Russian Empire
- Died: 3 January 1966 (aged 61) Melbourne, Australia
- Height: 174 cm (5 ft 9 in)
- Weight: 74 kg (163 lb)

Sport
- Sport: Athletics
- Event: Decathlon

Elmar Rähn (3 December 1904, Tartu – 3 January 1966, Melbourne) was an Estonian athlete. He competed in the men's decathlon at the 1924 Summer Olympics. In 1944, during World War II, Rähn fled to Germany and then emigrated to Australia in 1947 where he worked as a sports instructor.

Despite his healthy occupation, he died in 1966 aged only 61, of an intracerebral haemorrhage.
