= Indrek Tustit =

Estonian track and field athlete, coach, and physiotherapist

Personal information
- Born: 25 January 1978 (age 48) Kuressaare, Soviet Union

Sport
- Sport: Track and field

Indrek Tustit (born 25 January 1978) is an Estonian track and field athlete, coach and physiotherapist.

In 2001 he graduated from the University of Tartu in physical therapy speciality.

1995–2007 he become 8-times Estonian champion in different running disciplines (individual).

2013–2018 he was one of the coaches of Gerd Kanter. 2018–2019 he coached Magnus Kirt.

Awards:

- 2019: Estonian Coach of the Year (with Marek Vister)

== See also ==
- Sport in Estonia
