= Gustav Kalkun =

Estonian discus thrower

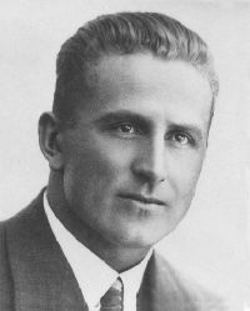

Personal information
- Born: 22 March 1898 Raadi, Governorate of Livonia
- Died: 24 April 1972 (aged 74) Windsor, Ontario, Canada
- Education: University of Geneva
- Height: 184 cm (6 ft 0 in)
- Weight: 82 kg (181 lb)

Sport
- Sport: Athletics
- Event: Discus throw
- Club: NMKÜ Tartu; University of Geneva

Achievements and titles
- Personal best: 45.61 (1928)

Gustav Kalkun (22 March 1898 – 24 April 1972) was an Estonian discus thrower. He competed at the 1924 and 1928 Olympics and placed 15th and 10th, respectively. He was selected as the Olympic flag bearer for Estonia in 1928.

Kalkun graduated from school in Riga, Latvia (1916), and then studied physical education in Tartu, Estonia (1927), and Geneva, Switzerland (1930). He fought as a volunteer in World War I and the Estonian War of Independence. He later worked as a physical education teacher in Tallinn, Narva and Tartu and acted as a referee and journalist covering athletics and basketball. In 1944, when Soviet troops arrived in Estonia, he emigrated to the United States. He was physical director of the YMCA in London, Ontario until 1950, when he took the same position at the YMCA in Sault Ste. Marie, Ontario. He was married to Waralda Ilmatara Kalkun, who died in 1967. Kalkun died at a hospital in Windsor, Ontario, in 1972.

Kalkun's nephew was actor Karl Kalkun, whose son is the sports journalist Kristjan Kalkun.
