= Rutti Luksepp =

Estonian athletics competitor

Personal information
- Born: 19 June 1974 (age 52) Türi, Soviet Union

Sport
- Sport: Track and field

Rutti Luksepp (since 2016 Ojassoo; born 19 June 1974) is an Estonian athletics competitor.

She was born in Türi. In 2000 she graduated from Tallinn Pedagogical Institute's Faculty of Physical Education.

She began athletics training in 1982 under the guidance of her parents. Later her coaches were Leonhard Soom, Valter Espe and Andrei Nazarov. She has competed at European Athletics Indoor Championships. She is multiple-times Estonian champion in different athletics disciplines. She has been a member of Estonian national athletics team.

Personal best:

- 200 m: 24,17 (1997)
- 300 m: 38,51 (1996)
- long jump: 6.18 (2001; with wind 6.22, 1999)
- heptathlon: 5587 (1999)
