= Merle Kivimets =

Estonian athletics competitor

Merle Kivimets (married name Bastien; born 21 July 1974) is an Estonian athletics competitor.

She was born in Kose-Uuemõisa, Harju County. In 1998, she graduated from the University of Tartu's Institute of Physical Education.

She began athletics training in 1984, coached by Margita Erma, Margit Aidla and Heiki Kivimets. She is multiple-times Estonian champion in different athletics disciplines. 1997–2002 she was a member of Estonian national athletics team.

Personal best:

- pole vault: 3.91 meters (1996)
- long jump: 5.96 meters (1997)
- 100 m hurdles: 14.66 seconds (2000)
