= Tõnu Kaukis =

Estonian athletics competitor and coach

Tõnu Kaukis (born 27 March 1956) is an Estonian coach and former decathlete.

He was born in Tallinn. In 1978 he graduated from Tallinn Pedagogical Institute's Faculty of Physical Education. He began athletics training in 1967, coached by Aleksander Tšikin. He is multiple-times Estonian champion in different athletics disciplines. 1974–1985 he was a member of Estonian national athletics team. Between In 1975 and 1985, he won ten gold medals at the Estonian SSR Championships (five in the 110 metres hurdles, three in long jump, and two in decathlon), three silver medals, and one bronze medal.

Since 1986 he is working as an athletics coach who has trained Indrek Turi, Madis Kallas, Maicel Uibo, Karl Robert Saluri.

Awards:

- 2016: (Estonian: Eesti Kultuurkapitali kehakultuuri ja spordi sihtkapitali aastapreemia)
