= Vladimir Heerik =

Estonian athletics competitor

Vladimir Heerik (born 27 March 1949) is an Estonian athletics competitor and coach.

He was born in Vorkuta, Russia. In 1975, he graduated from the University of Tartu's Faculty of Psychology and from the same institution in 1991, with a master's degree in psychology.

He began athletics training in 1957. He is multiple-times Estonian champion in different running disciplines. He has represented Estonian national athletics team 30 times. In 1977 he ran just under 2 hours and 20 minutes for the marathon distance in Klaipėda.

1982–1998 he was the director of Tartu Tamme Stadium.

Personal best:

- 1500 m: 3.51,7
- 5000 m: 14.20,6
- 10 000 m: 29.11,5
- marathon: 2:19.57
