= Ruudi Toomsalu =

Estonian sprinter

Personal information
- Nationality: Estonian
- Born: Rudolf Tomson; 2 April 1913 Tallinn, Estonia
- Died: 3 August 2002 (aged 89) Tallinn, Estonia

Sport
- Sport: Sprinting
- Event: 100 metres

Ruudi Toomsalu (2 April 1913 – 3 August 2002) was an Estonian sprinter. He competed in the men's 100 metres at the 1936 Summer Olympics.

== Acknowledgements ==
- Meritorious Sportsman of the Estonian SSR (1965)
- Order of the White Star, Class V (1998)
