= Nikolai Feldmann =

Estonian shot putter

Personal information
- Nationality: Estonian
- Born: 23 March 1904
- Died: 8 October 1975 (aged 71)

Sport
- Sport: Athletics
- Event: Shot put

Nikolai Feldmann (23 March 1904 – 8 October 1975) was an Estonian athlete. He competed in the men's shot put at the 1928 Summer Olympics.
