= Uno Källe =

Estonian runner and coach (1931–2009)

Uno Källe (16 June 1931 – 20 July 2009) was an Estonian runner and coach.

He was born in Karinu Rural Municipality, Järva County. In 1957, he graduated from Moscow Oblast Pedagogical Institute.

In youth he was an active skier. Later he focused on athletics, coached by Harald Rist in Tallinn, and Serafim Paškov in Moscow. He won medals at Estonian championships in different running disciplines. In 1952 and 1957, he was a member of Estonian national athletics team.

Since 1953, he worked also as a coach. Besides other posts, he was also a senior coach of Soviet Union women's juniors and women's seniors. Students: Svetlana Ulmasova, Elena Sipatova, Irina Bondarchuk, Jane Salumäe, Maile Mangusson, Rein Valdmaa.

In 1980, he was named as Merited Coach of Soviet Union.
