= Reena Koll =

Estonian pole vaulter

Personal information
- Full name: Reena Koll
- Born: 15 November 1996 (age 29)

Sport
- Country: Estonia
- Event: Pole vault

Achievements and titles
- Personal best(s): outdoor 4.36 indoor 4.31

Reena Koll (born 15 November 1996) is an Estonian pole vaulter.

Koll is the middle of three children to Hanno and Piret Koll (née Rasina). Her father, an athletic coach, acted as her trainer. Her mother was a track and field champion in her youth. Her younger brother is ice hockey player Harri Koll. She attended primary school in Jõgeva and secondary school in Jõhvi. Her personal best and an Estonian record is 4.36 metres, achieved in Tartu, July 2018.

Her indoor record is 4.31, achieved in February 2016, which is also a national record.
