= Karl Laas (runner) =

Estonian long-distance runner

Personal information
- Nationality: Estonian
- Born: 17 April 1908 Dorpat, Governorate of Livonia, Russian Empire
- Died: 28 December 1967 (aged 59) Tallinn, then part of Estonian SSR, Soviet Union

Sport
- Sport: Long-distance running
- Event: Marathon

Karl Laas (17 April 1908 – 28 December 1967) was an Estonian long-distance runner. He competed in the marathon at the 1928 Summer Olympics.
