= Maris Rõngelep =

Estonian athletics competitor

Maris Rõngelep (since 2017 Niit; born 17 March 1984) is an Estonian athletics competitor.

She was born in present-day Rae Parish, Harju County. In 2000-2003, she studied at Audentes Sports Gymnasium.

She began athletics training in 1997, coached by Ando Algre. She focused on hammer throw. She has competed at the European Athletics Championships. She is multiple-times Estonian champion in hammer throw. 2003–2012 she was a member of Estonian national athletics team.
