= Veljo Lamp =

Estonian athletics competitor

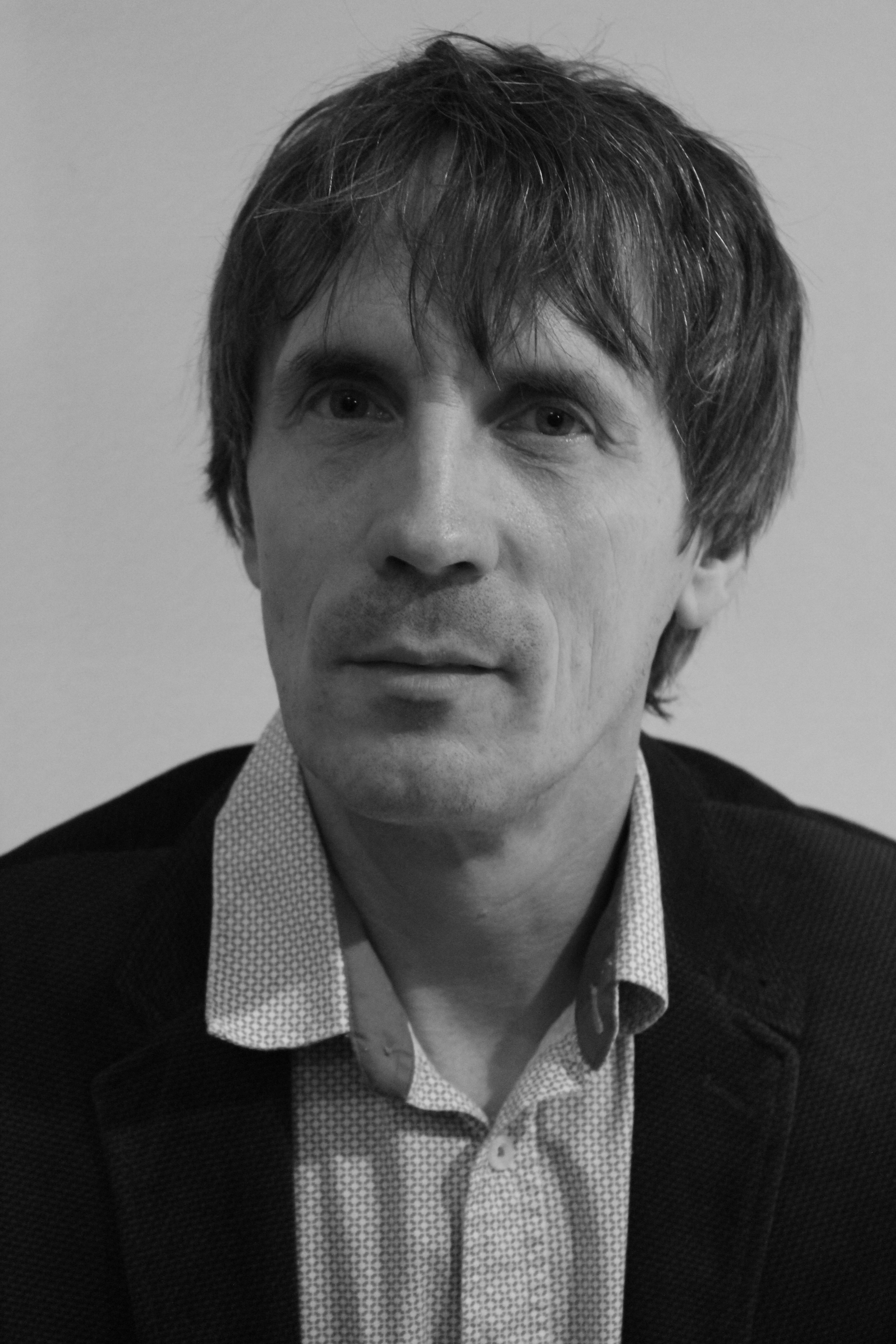
Veljo Lamp

Veljo Lamp (born 2 January 1968) is an Estonian athletics competitor.

He was born in Tartu. In 1992 he graduated from the University of Tartu's Institute of Physical Education.

He began athletics training in 1982, coached by Hans Pukk. Later he entered to Tartu Kalev's athletics school and was coached by Arne Vals. He is multiple-times Estonian champion in different running disciplines. 1991–1996 he was a member of Estonian national athletics team.

Personal best:

- 800 m: 1.52,4 (1991)
- 3000 m steeplechase: 8.54,4 (1991)
- 1500 m: 3.47,9 (1992)
- 5000 m: 14.23,88 (mõlemad 1992)

Award:

- 2019 (Estonian: Eesti Kultuurkapitali kehakultuuri ja spordi sihtkapitali aastapreemia)
