= Margus Luik =

Estonian race walker

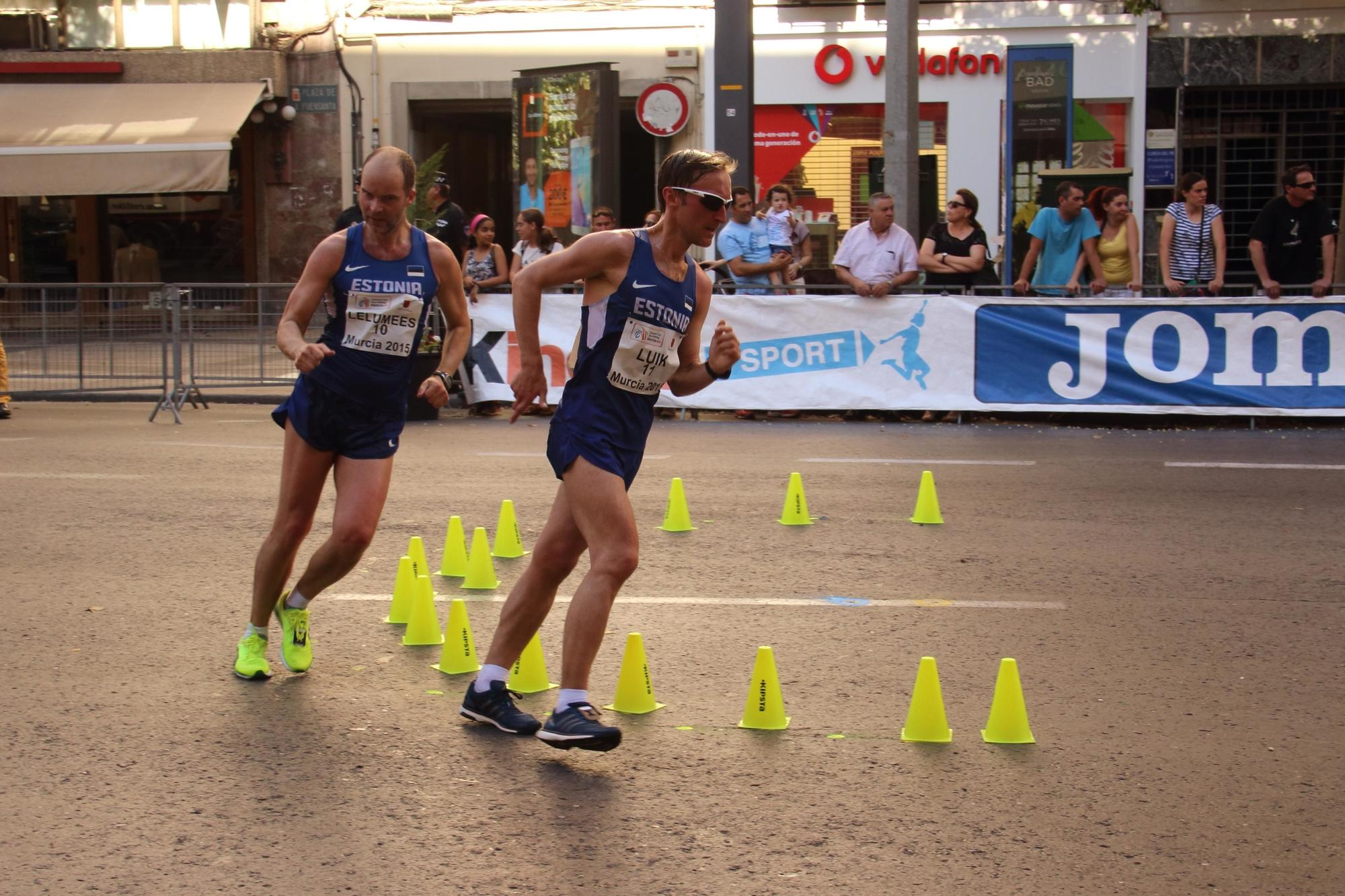
Margus Luik (right) and Lauri Lelumees in 2015

Margus Luik (born 11 January 1980) is an Estonian athletics competitor (race walker).

He was born in Pärnu. In 2002 he graduated from Tallinn Pedagogical University in physical education and recreation.

He started his athletics exercising in 1990. 1991–2006 his coach was Endel Susi, and he focused on race walking. He is 25-times Estonian champion. 2001–2015 he was a member of Estonian national athletics team.
