= Toomas Tarm =

Estonian athletics competitor

Toomas Tarm (born 31 December 1968) is an Estonian long-distance runner.

He was born in Tallinn. In 1992 he graduated from Tallinn Pedagogical Institute's Faculty of Physical Education.

He started his athletics exercising in the sport club Trudovye Rezervy, coached by Jaan Anderson, and later Meelis Minn. He is multiple-times Estonian champion in different long-distance running disciplines. 1994–2002 he was a member of Estonian national athletics team.

Records:

- 5000 m: 14.32,66 (1999)
- 10 000 m: 30.31,80 (1994)
- half marathon: 1:05.07 (1999)
- marathon: 2:17.42 (1994)
