= Roman Fosti =

Estonian long-distance runner

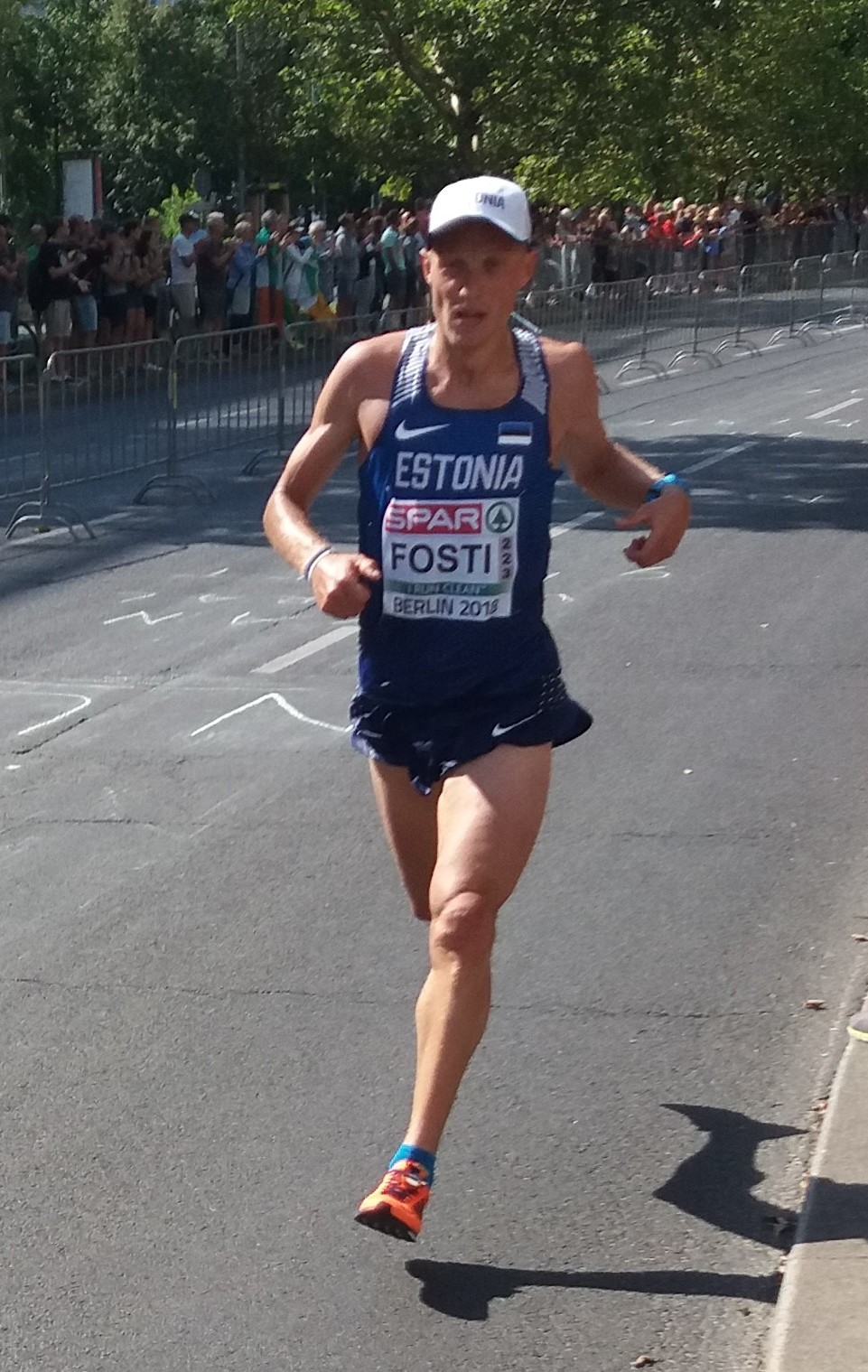
- Fosti at the 2018 European Championships

Personal information
- Born: 6 June 1983 (age 42)
- Height: 1.81 m (5 ft 11 in)
- Weight: 70 kg (154 lb)

Sport
- Sport: Athletics
- Event(s): 800 m, 1500 m, half marathon, marathon
- Club: Stamina SK
- Coached by: Jane Salumäe

Roman Fosti (born 6 June 1983) is an Estonian long-distance runner who specialises in the marathon. He competed at the 2015 World Championships in Beijing finishing 20th, the 2016 Olympic Games in Rio de Janeiro finishing 61st, and the 2017 World Championships in London finishing 53rd. He previously competed mostly in middle-distance events switching to the marathon in 2013. He won the Tallinn Marathon in 2018.

== Major competition record ==
Year	Competition	Venue	Position	Event	Result
Representing Estonia
2002	World Junior Championships	Kingston, Jamaica	16th (sf)	800 m	1:53.36
2009	Universiade	Belgrade, Serbia	22nd (sf)	800 m	1:53.58
2009	Universiade	Belgrade, Serbia	20th (h)	1500 m	3:48.15
2011	European Indoor Championships	Paris, France	23rd (h)	1500 m	3:49.98
2011	Universiade	Shenzhen, China	23rd (sf)	800 m	1:50.77
2011	Universiade	Shenzhen, China	9th (h)	1500 m	3:47.34
2014	World Half Marathon Championships	Copenhagen, Denmark	73rd	Half marathon	1:05:14
2014	European Championships	Zürich, Switzerland	18th	Marathon	2:17:54
2015	World Championships	Beijing, China	20th	Marathon	2:20:35
2016	European Championships	Amsterdam, Netherlands	31st	Half marathon	1:06:00
2016	Olympic Games	Rio de Janeiro, Brazil	61st	Marathon	2:19:26
2017	World Championships	London, United Kingdom	53rd	Marathon	2:23:28
2018	World Half Marathon Championships	Valencia, Spain	69th	Half marathon	1:03:45
2018	European Championships	Berlin, Germany	17th	Marathon	2:17:57
2019	World Championships	Doha, Qatar	33rd	Marathon	2:18:30
2021	Olympic Games	Sapporo, Japan	68th	Marathon	2:25:37
2022	European Championships	Munich, Germany	41st	Marathon	2:19:34

== Personal bests ==
Outdoor

- 800 metres – 1:49.07 (Dessau 2005)
- 1500 metres – 3:46.18 (Tartu 2011)
- Half marathon – 1:03:03 (Gdynia 2020)
- Marathon – 2:10:46 (Siena 2021)

Indoor

- 1500 metres – 3:48.72 (Tartu 2012)
