= Pavel Loskutov =

Estonian long-distance runner

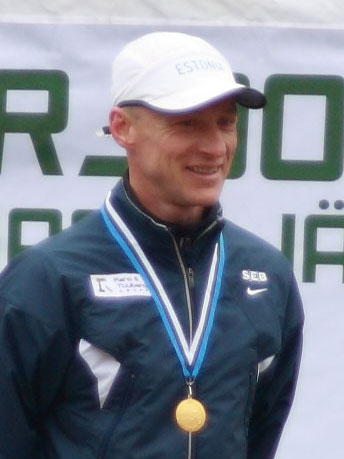

Medal record

Men's athletics

Representing Estonia

European Championships
Silver medal – second place	2002 Munich	Marathon

Pavel Loskutov (born 2 December 1969 in Valka, Latvian SSR, Soviet Union) is an Estonian former long-distance runner who specialized in marathon races. He has competed in the Olympic marathon race four times consecutively, from the 1996 Atlanta Olympics to the 2008 Beijing Games.

== Biography ==
In 2001, he won the Göteborgsvarvet half marathon in Gothenburg with a time of 1:03:00. Loskutov finished as the runner-up of the Paris Marathon in 2002 and went on to win a silver medal later that year at the 2002 European Championships in 2:13:18 hours. He was the winner of the JoongAng Seoul Marathon in 2003 and 2004. He also has won half-marathon at the 2008 Riga Marathon. He retired from competition in 2010.

== Achievements ==
Year	Competition	Venue	Position	Event	Result
Representing Estonia
1994	European Championships	Helsinki, Finland	48th	Marathon	2:22:49
1995	World Championships	Gothenburg, Sweden	49th	Marathon	2:33:42
1996	Summer Olympics	Atlanta, United States	58th	Marathon	2:23:14
1997	World Championships	Athens, Greece	48th	Marathon	2:29:10
1998	World Cross Country Championships	Marrakesh, Morocco	85th	Long race	37:25
1998	World Half Marathon Championships	Uster, Switzerland	66th	Half marathon	1:05:00
1998	European Championships	Budapest, Hungary	29th	Marathon	2:19:38
1999	World Half Marathon Championships	Palermo, Italy	55th	Half marathon	1:05:45
1999	Frankfurt Marathon	Frankfurt, Germany	1st	Marathon	2:12:37
1999	Helsinki Marathon	Helsinki, Finland	1st	Marathon	2:19:18
2000	Summer Olympics	Sydney, Australia	35th	Marathon	2:19:41
2001	Frankfurt Marathon	Frankfurt, Germany	1st	Marathon	2:11:09
2002	Paris Marathon	Paris, France	2nd	Marathon	2:08:53
2002	European Championships	Munich, Germany	2nd	Marathon	2:13:18
2002	Fukuoka Marathon	Fukuoka, Japan	4th	Marathon	2:10:14
2003	JoongAng Seoul Marathon	Seoul, South Korea	1st	Marathon	2:09:15
2004	Summer Olympics	Athens, Greece	26th	Marathon	2:18:09
2004	JoongAng Seoul Marathon	Seoul, South Korea	1st	Marathon	2:09:34
2005	JoongAng Seoul Marathon	Seoul, South Korea	4th	Marathon	2:12:12
2006	Paris Marathon	Paris, France	12th	Marathon	2:11:25
2007	World Championships	Osaka, Japan	—	Marathon	DNF
2007	Beppu-Ōita Marathon	Beppu-Ōita, Japan	8th	Marathon	2:14:49
2008	Summer Olympics	Beijing, China	75th	Marathon	2:39:01

== Personal bests ==
- 5,000 metres – 13:54.87 (2001)
- Half marathon – 1:03:00 (2001) NR
- Marathon – 2:08:53 (2002) NR
