= Lauri Lelumees =

Estonian race walker (born 1978)

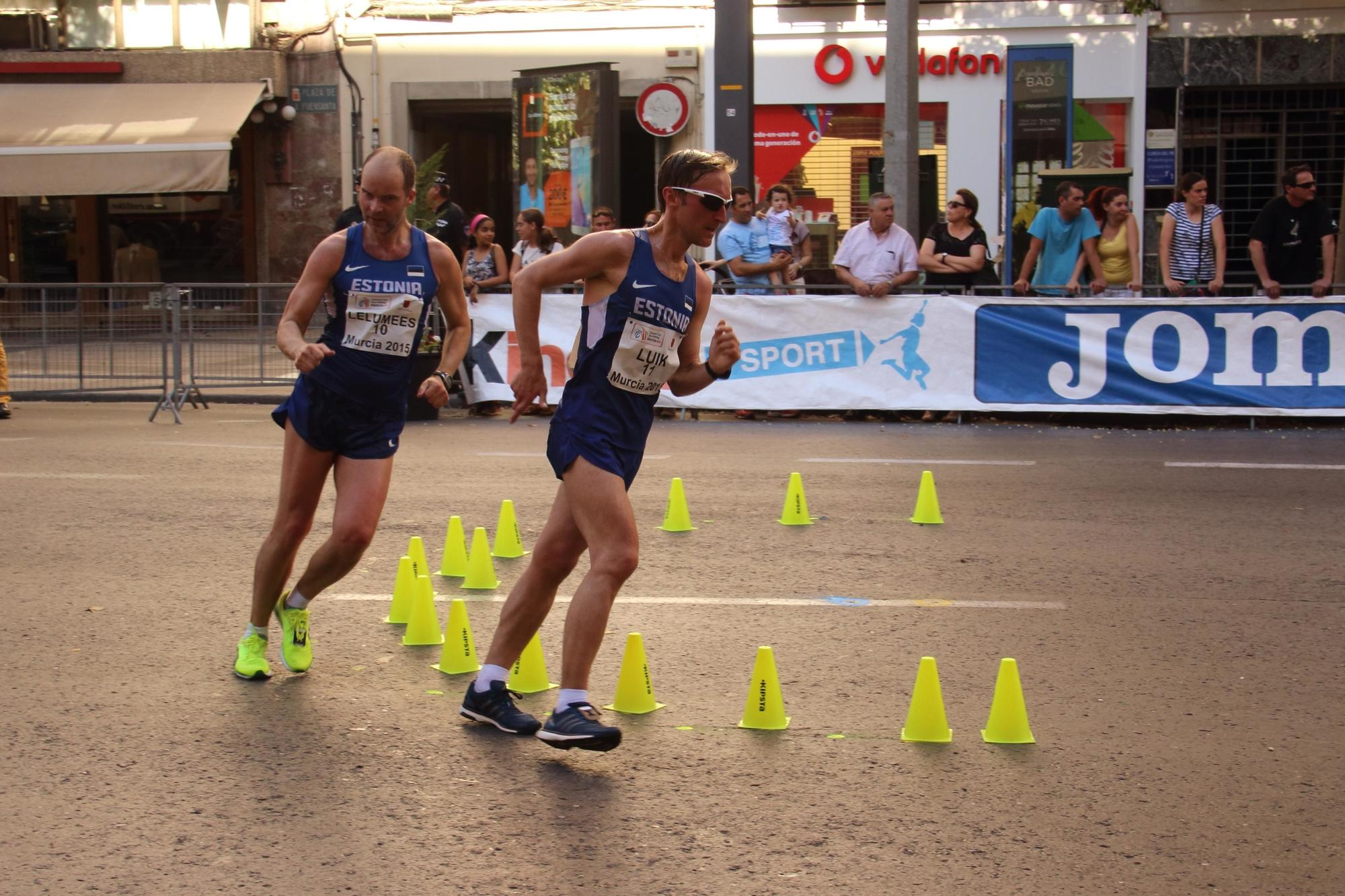
Lauri Lelumees (left) and Margus Luik (2015)

Lauri Lelumees (born 23 April 1978) is an Estonian race walker.

He was born in Tallinn. In 2002 he graduated from Tallinn Pedagogical University in managing specialty (Estonian: haldusjuhtimine).

He started his athletics training in 1996, coached by Urmas Põldre. He was focused on race walking. He is a 30-time Estonian champion. 2006-2017, he was a member of the Estonian national athletics team.

His personal best in 10 km race walking is 42.55,6 (2007).
