= Toomas Turb =

Estonian athletics competitor (1957–2026)

Personal information
- Born: 31 January 1957 Surju, Pärnu County, then part of Estonian SSR, Soviet Union
- Died: 5 July 2026 (aged 69)

Sport
- Sport: Track and field
Medal record
Representing Soviet Union
Summer Universiade
Gold medal – first place	1981 Bucharest	10,000m

Toomas Turb (31 January 1957 – 5 July 2026) was an Estonian athletics competitor.

Turb was born in Surju, Pärnu County on 31 January 1957. In 1980, he graduated from Tallinn Pedagogical Institute's Faculty of Physical Education.

He started his sporting exercising in 1969, coached by Ain Koovit. Later his coaches were Rein Rooks and Olav Karikosk. In 1981, he won gold medal at Athletics at the 1981 Summer Universiade – Men's 10,000 metres. He was a multiple-time Estonian champion in different running disciplines.

Turb died on 5 July 2026, at the age of 69.

Personal best:

- 1500 m: 3.45,3 (1982)
- 5000 m: 13.30,53 (1982)
- 10 000 m: 27.54,18 (1981)
- half marathon: 1:04.41 (1992)
