= Margus Pirksaar =

Estonian athletics competitor

Margus Pirksaar (born 25 October 1974) is an Estonian athletics competitor.

He was born in Karksi-Nuia. In 2000 he graduated from vocational university Veritas in social sciences.

Firsty he exercised in skiing and orienteering. Later he exercised in athletics, coached by Uno Källe, Enn Sellik ja Harry Lemberg. He finished 28th at 2002 European Athletics Championships – Men's marathon. He is multiple-times Estonian champion in different running disciplines.

Personal best:

- 1500 m – 3.53,99
- 3000 m – 8.21,01
- 5000 m – 14.23,63
- 10 000 m – 30.35,53
- half marathon – 1:05.22
- marathon – 2:18.29
