= Villem =

Male given name

- Gender: Male

Origin
- Region of origin: Estonia

Other names
- Related names: Villu, Ville, Vili, Viljar

Villem is an Estonian masculine given name. It is a cognate of the English language William and the German Wilhelm and may refer to:

- Villem Gross (1922–2001), Estonian writer and journalist
- Villem Grünthal-Ridala (1885–1942), Estonian poet, translator, linguist and folklorist
- Villem Kapp (1913–1964), Estonian composer
- Villem Maaker (1891–1966), Estonian politician
- Villem Maasik (1883–1919), Estonian lawyer, trade unionist, and politician
- Villem Orav (1883-1952), Estonian historian, teacher, and scholar of pedagogy
- Villem Raam (1910-1996), Estonian art historian, art critic and conservator-restorer
- Villem Reimann (1906–1992), Estonian composer and pedagogue
- Villem Tammai (1892–1973), Estonian politician
- Villem Tomiste (born 1975), Estonian architect
