= Lembi Vaher =

Estonian pole vaulter

Personal information
- Full name: Lembi Vaher
- Born: 11 February 1987 (age 39) Tallinn, then part of Estonian SSR, Soviet Union

Sport
- Country: Estonia
- Event: Pole vault

Achievements and titles
- Personal best(s): outdoor 4.09 indoor 4.22

Lembi Vaher (born 11 February 1987) is an Estonian pole vaulter.

Her personal best is 4.09 metres, achieved in Kohila in June 2009.

Her indoor record is 4.22, achieved in February 2012, which was also a national record.

She is Estonian champion 2007−2010, 2012−2013.
