= Villu (given name) =

Male given name

- Gender: Male
- Language: Estonian

Origin
- Region of origin: Estonia

Other names
- Related names: Villem

Villu is an Estonian masculine given name, a version of William.

People named Villu include:

- Villu Jürjo (born 1950), Lutheran cleric and politician
- Villu Kangur (born 1957), poet, translator, actor and screenwriter
- Villu Kõve (born 1971), judge, Chief Justice of the Supreme Court of Estonia
- Villu Müüripeal (1937–2005), agronomist and politician
- Villu Reiljan (born 1953), politician
- Villu Tamme (born 1963), punk musician (J.M.K.E.)
- Villu Toots (1916–1993), calligrapher, book designer, educator, palaeographer and author
- Villu Veski (born 1962), saxophonist and music teacher
