= Maile Mangusson =

Estonian athletics competitor

Maile Mangusson (born 3 July 1973) is an Estonian athletics competitor.

She was born in Vändra Selsoviet. In 1997 she graduated from Tallinn Pedagogical Institute's Faculty of Physical Education.

She started her athletics exercising in 1987, coached by Avo Jussi. 1991-2005 her coach was Uno Källe. She is multiple-times Estonian champion in different sport disciplines. She has been a member of Estonian national athletics team.

Records:

- 400 m: 56,57 (2001)
- 800 m: 2.04,23 (2001)
- 1000 m: 2.45,54 (2000)
- heptathlon: 5139 (1998)

In 1997 she was named as Best Women Athlete of Pärnu County.
