= Viljandi Landscape Conservation Area =

Protected area in Estonia

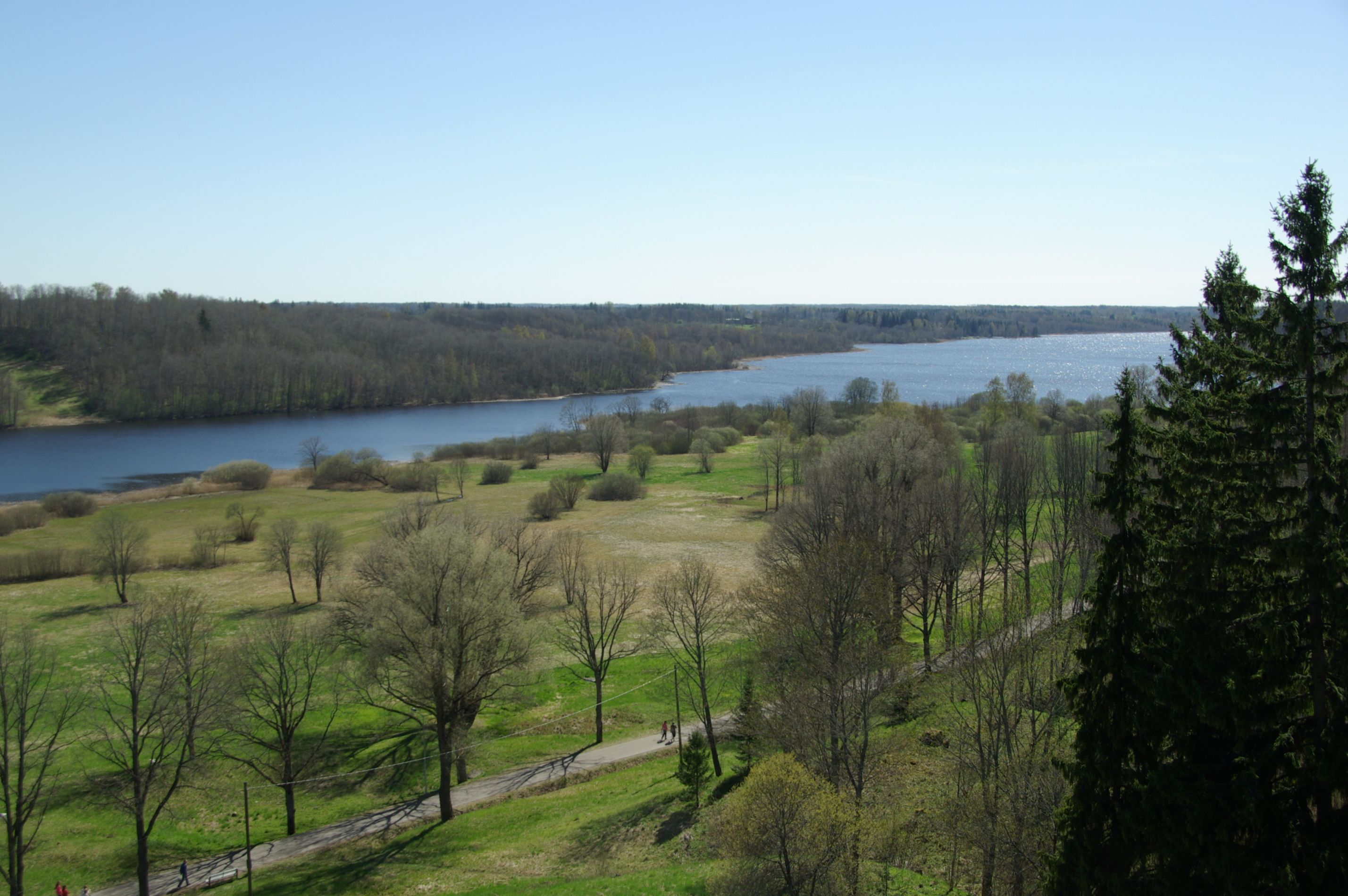

- Location within Estonia
- Location: Estonia
- Coordinates: 58°21′N 25°36′E
- Area: 367 ha (910 acres)
- Established: 1964 (2009)

Viljandi Landscape Conservation Area is a nature park situated in Viljandi County, Estonia.

Its area is 366.8 ha.

The protected area was designated in 1964 to protect Viljandi Ancient Valley (included Viljandi Lake) and Viljandi Castle Park. In 2009, the protected area was redesigned to the landscape conservation area.
