= Grand Race around Lake Viljandi =

Annual running competition in Viljandi, Estonia

- Date: 1 May
- Location: Town of Viljandi, Estonia
- Event type: Cross country
- Distance: 12 km for men 12 km for women
- Established: 1928
- Website: Grand Race around Lake Viljandi

The Grand Race around Lake Viljandi (Estonian: Suurjooks ümber Viljandi järve) is an annual cross country running competition that takes place around the Lake Viljandi in Viljandi, Estonia. It is also the oldest traditional running event in Estonia and has been organized already since 1928. It is held annually at 1 May. The history of the race goes back to an idea of a schoolteacher T. Andresson.

The 12-kilometer course winds primarily through forest tracks, gravel trails, and asphalt sections, with the start and finish lines hosted at the Viljandi City Stadium. While route selection is largely flexible for competitors, participants are strictly required to pass through two mandatory control checkpoints at opposite ends of the lake—located at the Orika hiking trail bridge (4.8 km) and the Viiratsi hiking trail bridge (10.2 km)—alongside intermediate marks at Huntaugu Hill and Orika Bridge.

== Past senior race winners ==
Key: Course record

Edition	Year	Men's winner	Time (m:s)	Women's winner	Time (m:s)
73	2002	Pavel Loskutov (EST)	35:18	Maile Mangusson (EST)	45:30
74	2003	Pavel Loskutov (EST)	36:18	Maile Mangusson (EST)	45:46
75	2004	Pavel Loskutov (EST)	35:17	Maile Mangusson (EST)	42:52
76	2005	Aleksei Sokolov (RUS)	36:20	Tiina Tross (EST)	43:48
77	2006	Pavel Loskutov (EST)	34:58	Natalja Belova (RUS)	41:12
78	2007	Pavel Loskutov (EST)	35:29	Natalja Belova (RUS)	41:10
79	2008	Pavel Loskutov (EST)	34:50	Natalja Sokolova (RUS)	41:26
80	2009	Vjatšeslav Košelev (EST)	37:06	Natalja Sokolova (RUS)	41:06
81	2010	Pavel Loskutov (EST)	36:16	Evelin Kärner (EST)	45:33
82	2011	Taivo Püi (EST)	37:02	Julija Bulina (EST)	44:17
83	2012	Keio Kits (EST)	36:57	Evelin Talts (EST)	43:15
