= Kõpu (river) =

River in Estonia

Kõpu River
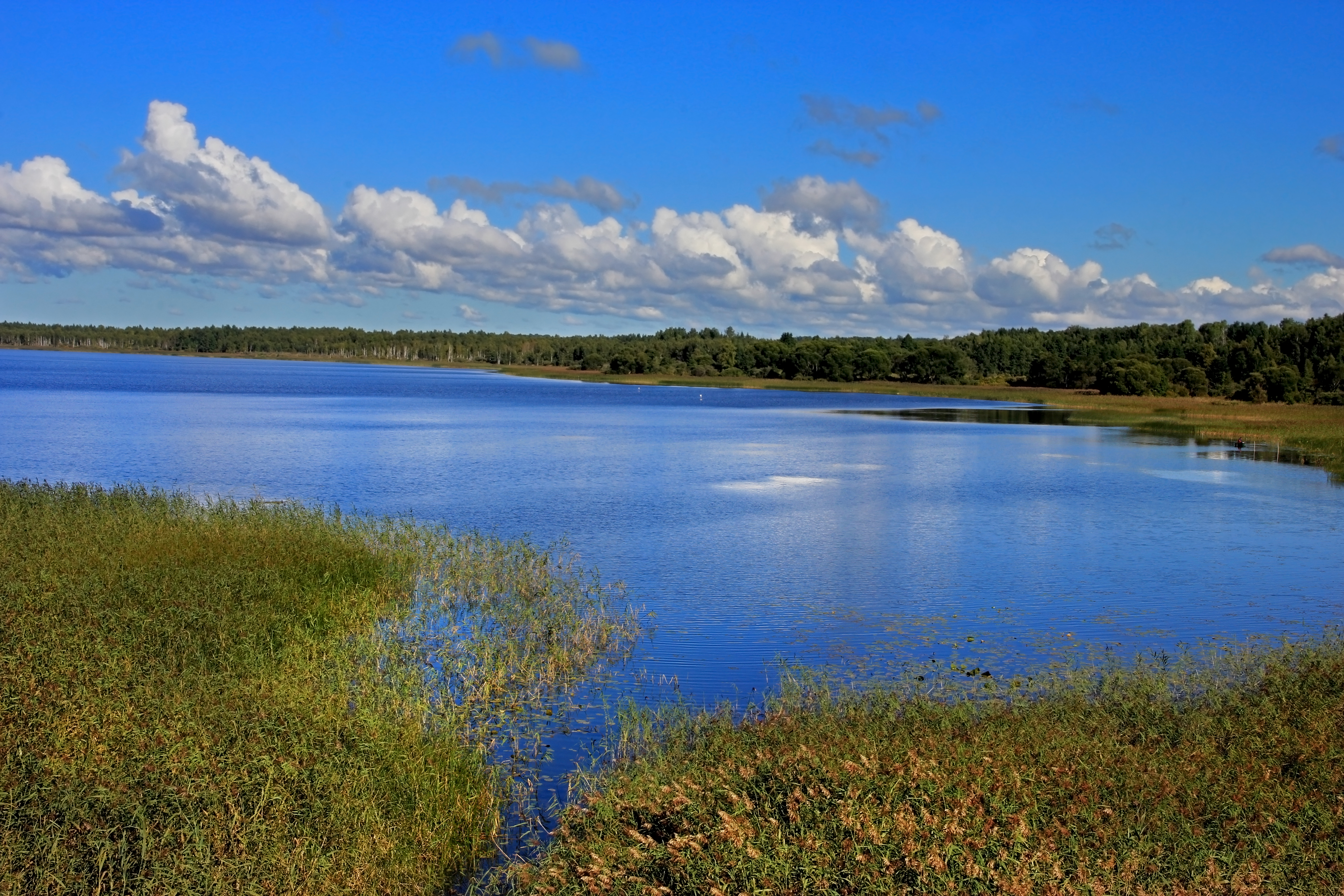

Location
- Country: Estonia

Physical characteristics
- Mouth: Raudna River
  - coordinates: 58°23′28″N 25°18′10″E
- Length: 75.2 km
- Basin size: 399.2 km²

The Kõpu River is a river in Viljandi County, Estonia. The river is 75.2 km long, and its basin size is 399.2 km^{2}. It discharges into the Raudna River.
