= Viljandi railway station =

Railway station in Viljandi, Estonia

Viljandi
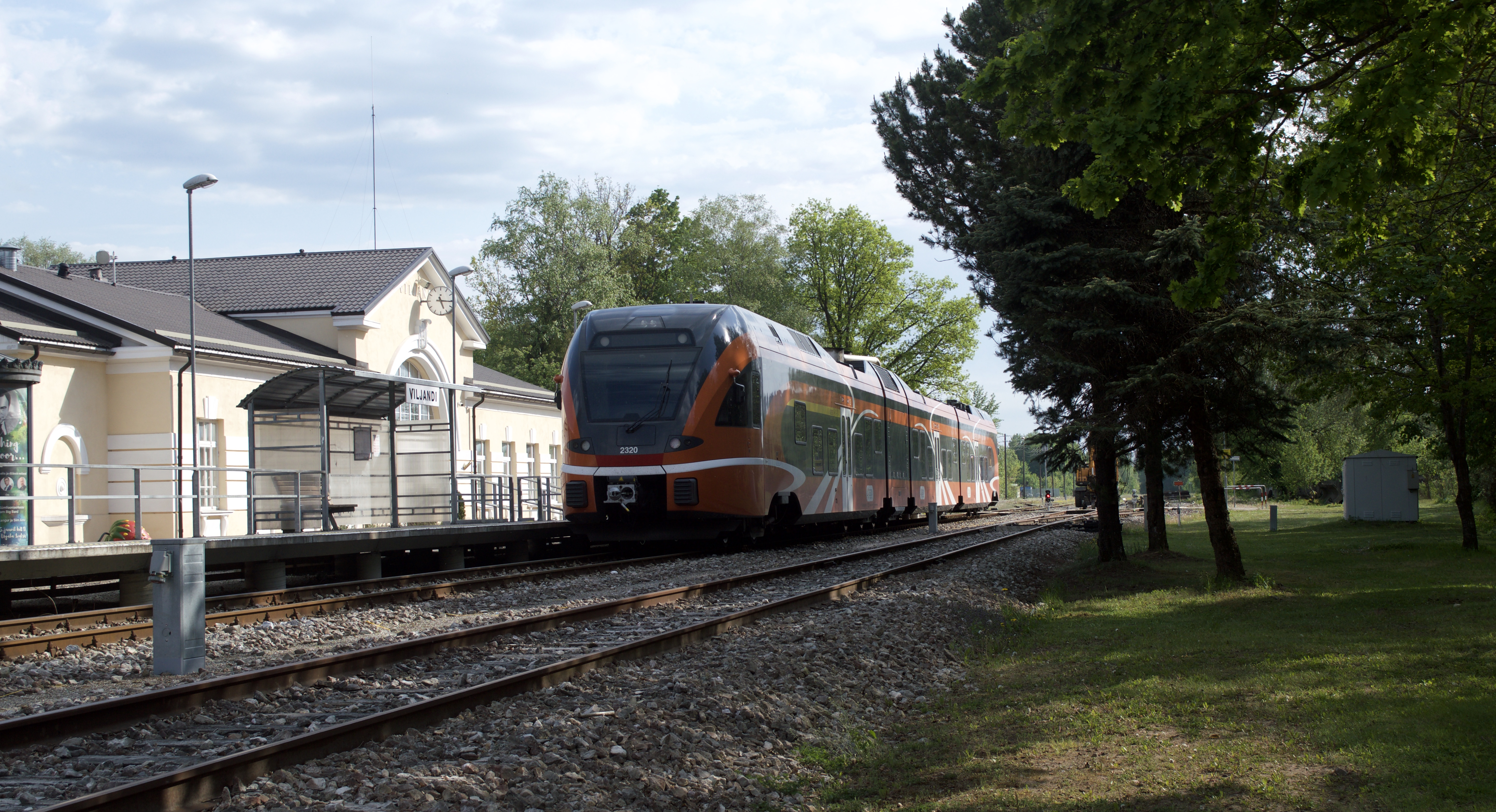
- Viljandi railway station in 2019

General information
- Location: Vaksali tänav 44; Viljandi, Viljandi County; Estonia
- Coordinates: 58°21′27″N 25°34′25″E
- System: Terminal train station
- Owner: Edelaraudtee
- Platforms: 1
- Tracks: 1
- Train operators: Elron
- Connections: Buses 2 6 8 9 Regional Buses 18B 28A 28B 49A 80

Construction
- Structure type: at-grade
- Accessible: yes

Other information
- Fare zone: None (station-based ticket price)

History
- Opened: 1897; 129 years ago

Services
Preceding station	Elron	Following station
Sürgavere towards Tallinn	Tallinn–Viljandi	Terminus
Location

Viljandi railway station (Estonian: Viljandi raudteejaam) is a railway station serving the town of Viljandi in southern Estonia.

The station is the southern terminus of the Tallinn–Viljandi railway line. The station opened in 1897 when a narrow-gauge railway line was opened connecting Mõisaküla with Viljandi, which was prolonged to Tallinn in 1901. During 1926 and 1927, the station building was rebuilt completely, adding a second floor and a canopy. In the Second World War, the building was destroyed. After the war, a new building was built in stalinist style, which was opened on the 4th of november 1953.

The narrow-gauge railway between Mõisaküla and Viljandi was closed in 1973. Currently, the station is owned by the railway infrastructure company Edelaraudtee and served by trains operated by the government-owned passenger train operator Elron.

== See also ==
- List of railway stations in Estonia
- Rail transport in Estonia
- History of rail transport in Estonia
