= Viljandi =

Town in Estonia

- Town
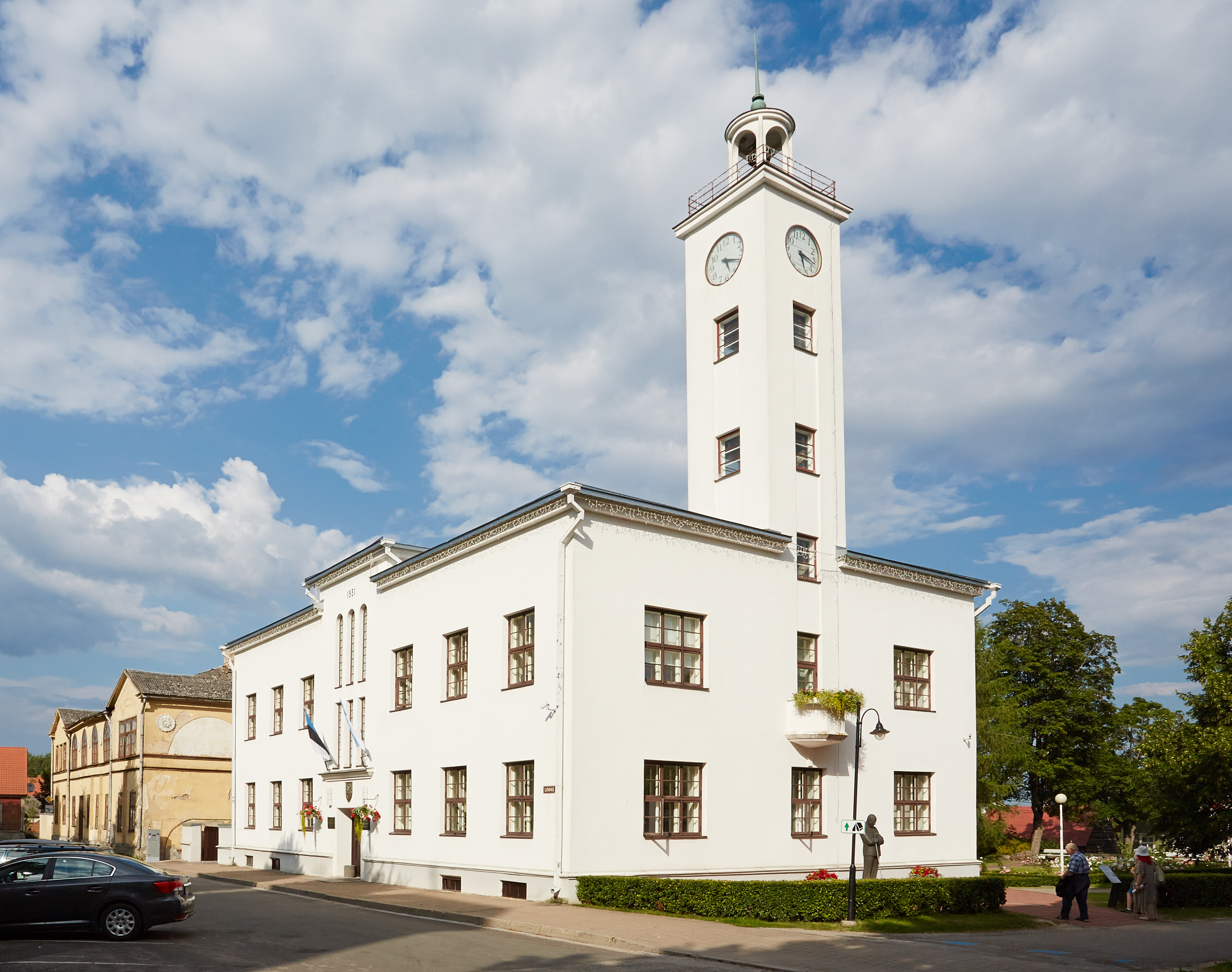
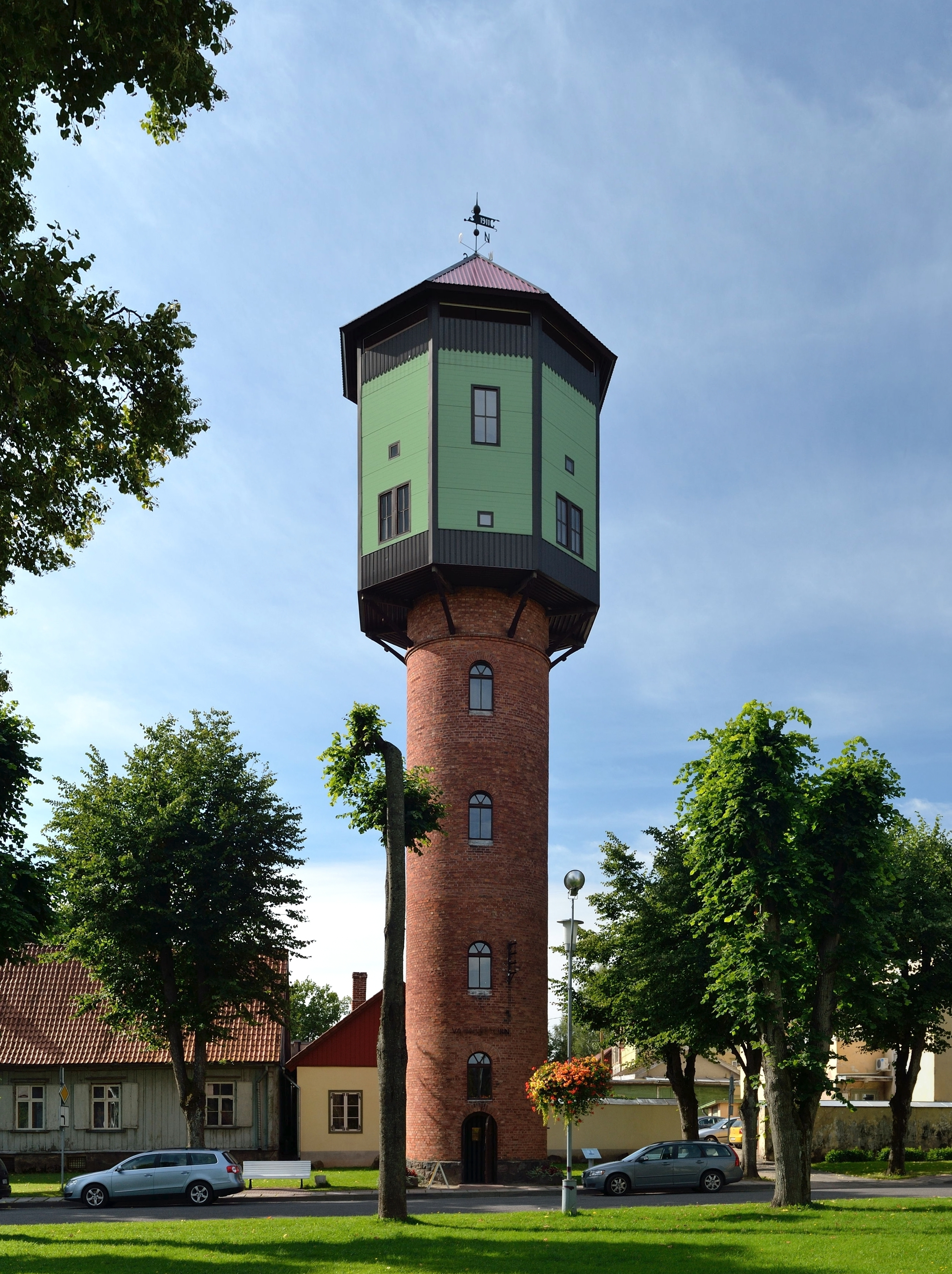
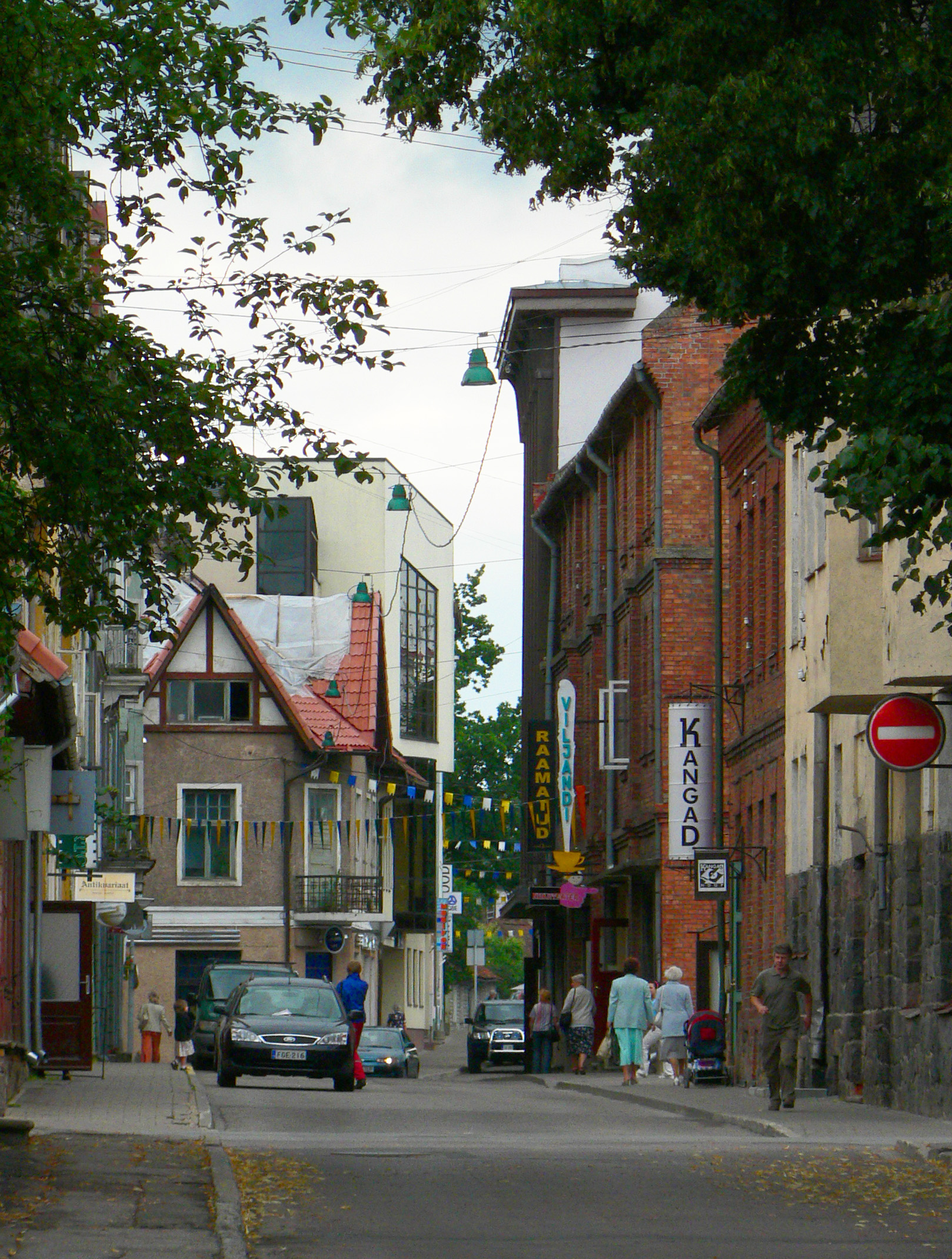
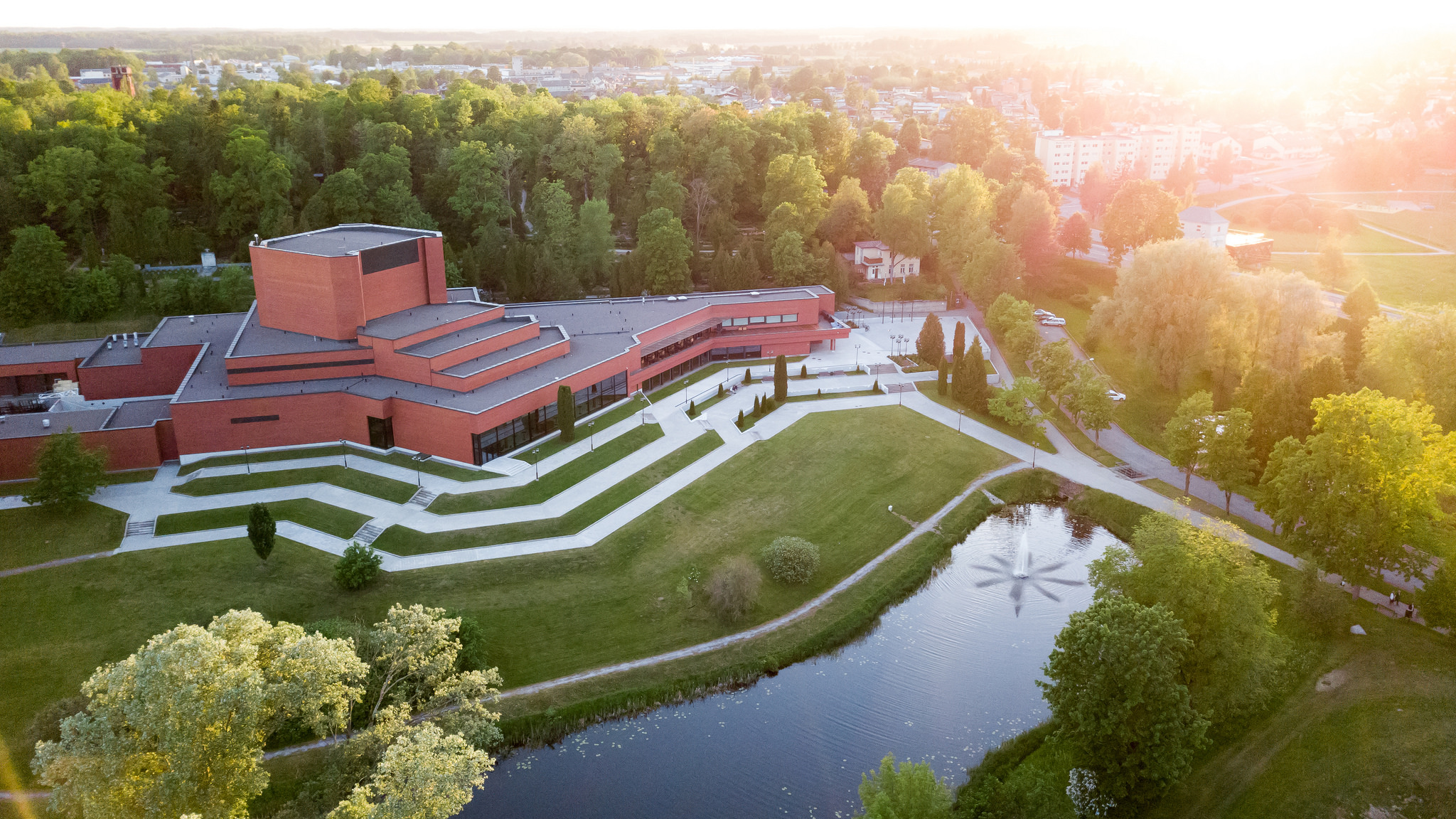
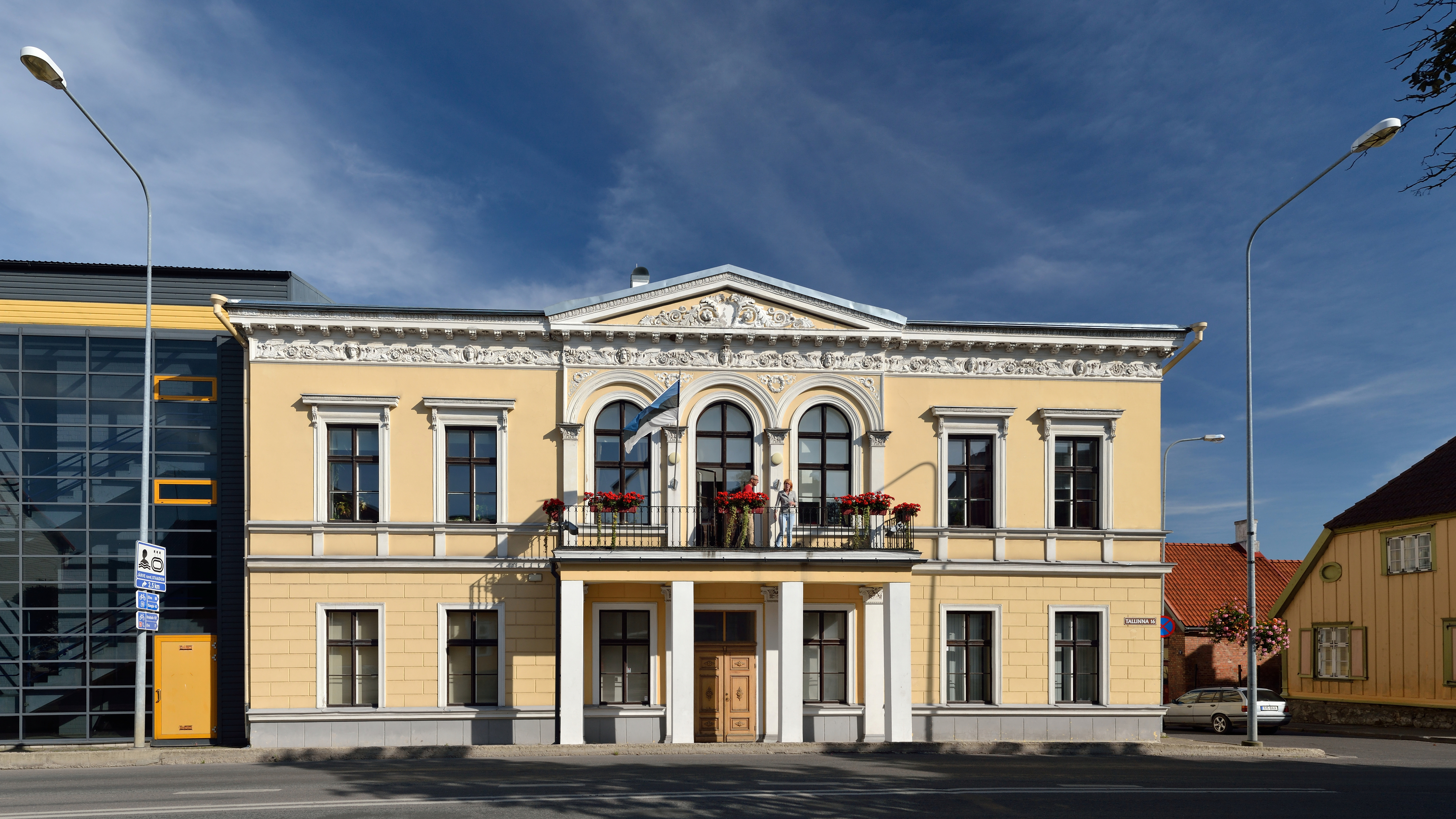
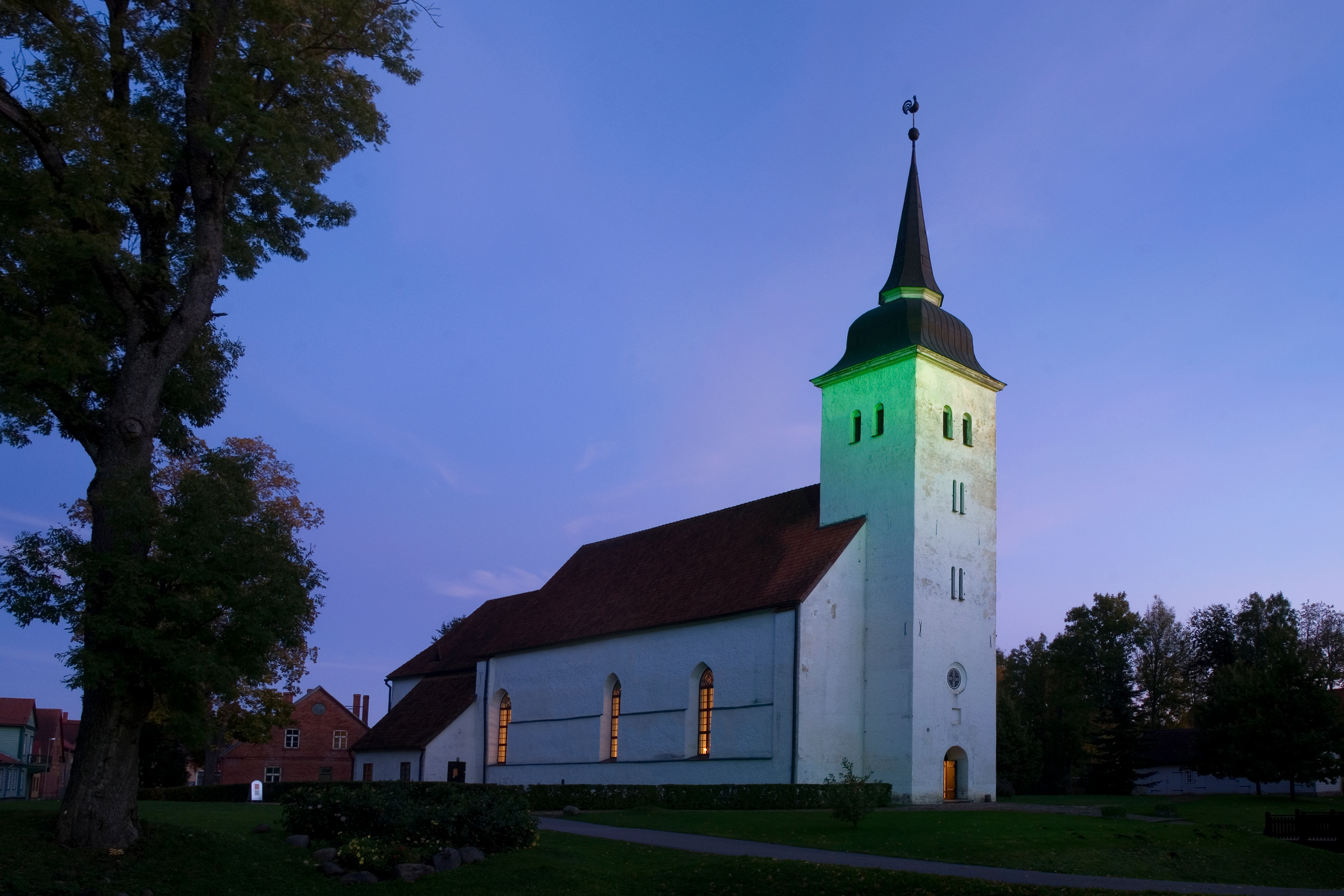
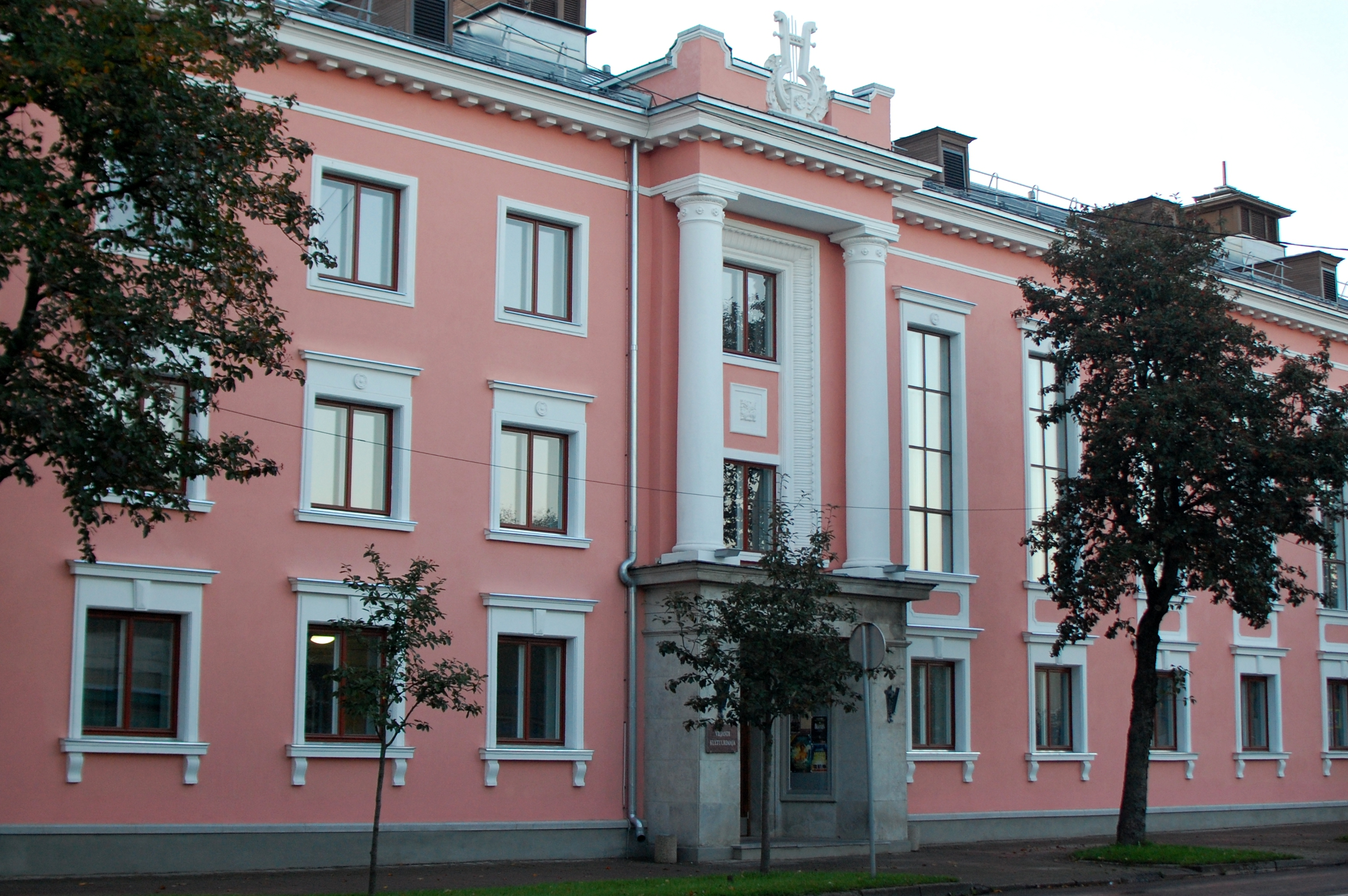
- Clockwise from top: Viljandi town hall; Old water tower; downtown; Ugala theatre; University of Tartu Viljandi Culture Academy, St. John's church; Sakala Centre

- Flag Coat of arms

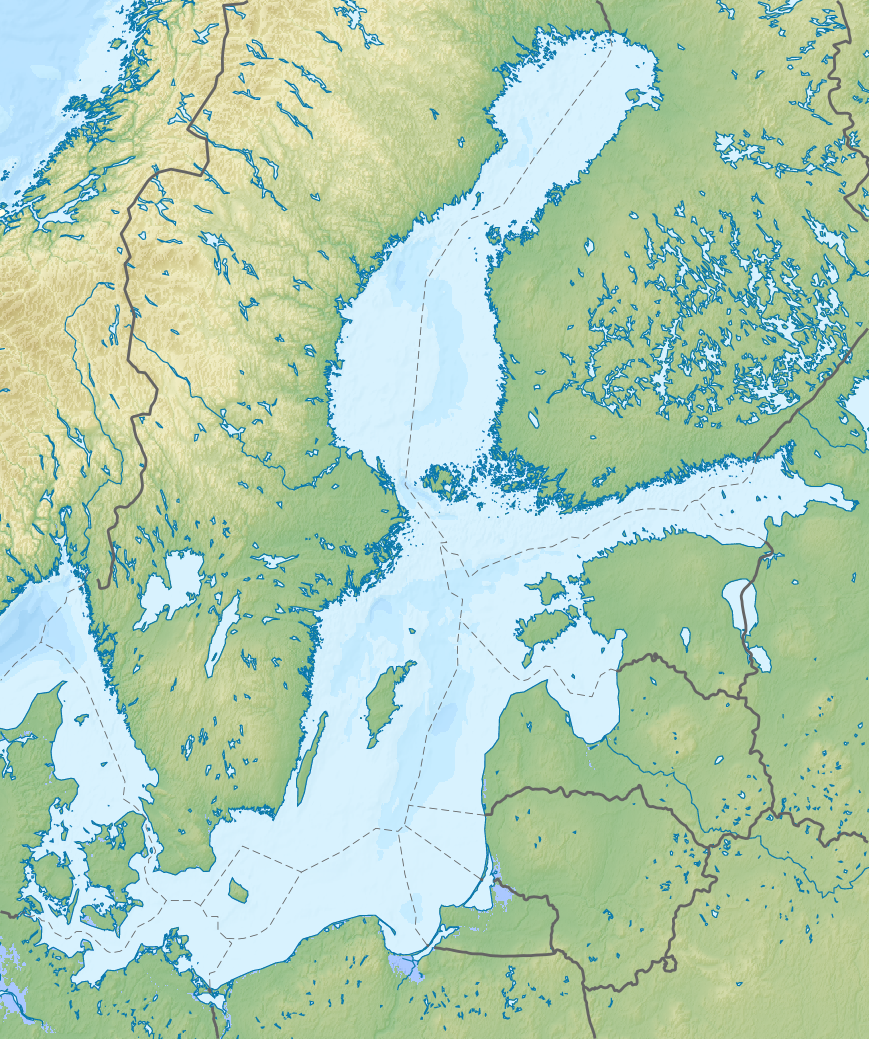
- Location within Europe Location within Baltic Sea region Location within Estonia
- Coordinates: 58°22′N 25°36′E
- Country: Estonia
- County: Viljandi
- Founded: 1283

Government
  - Mayor: Jaak Pihlak

Area
  - Total: 14.62 km^{2} (5.64 sq mi)
- Elevation: 83 m (272 ft)

Population (2026)
  - Total: 17,000
  - Rank: 6th
  - Density: 1,200/km^{2} (3,000/sq mi)

Ethnicity
  - Estonians: 94%
  - Russians: 3%
  - other: 2.1%
- Time zone: UTC+2 (EET)
  - Summer (DST): UTC+3 (EEST)
- Postal code: 71020
- ISO 3166 code: EE-897
- Website: viljandi.ee

Viljandi (Estonian pronunciation: [ˈvilʲːjɑnʲːdi]) is a city and municipality in southern Estonia with a population of 17,000 in 2026. It is the capital of Viljandi County and is geographically located between two major Estonian cities, Pärnu and Tartu.

The town was first mentioned in 1283, upon being granted its town charter by Wilhelm von Endorpe. The town became a member of the Hanseatic League at the beginning of the 14th century, and is one of five Estonian cities and cities in the league. The once influential Estonian newspaper Sakala was founded in Viljandi in 1878.

== Symbols ==
The flag of Viljandi is bi-coloured, its upper part is light blue and lower part white. The city's shield-shaped coat of arms is light blue, with a white rose in the middle. Viljandi is the white rose city – in midsummer there are 720 white roses flowering in front of the city hall, planted for the city's anniversary in 2003. In summer, the White Rose Day is celebrated in Viljandi.

== History ==
The first records of civilization in the surroundings of Viljandi date back to the 5th millennium B.C. The first written record of the earthen stronghold of Viljandi was in the year 1154 in the commentaries to al-Idrisi's world atlas Geography.

In the 12th century, a permanent settlement emerged around the stronghold of Viljandi, which also became the economic centre of the ancient Sakala district.

In 1211 the hillfort of the Estonians in Viljandi was besieged by a joint army of Germans, Latvians, and Livonians. The Livonian Sword Brethren (later the Livonian Order) captured the hillfort in August 1223 from a contingent of the people of Ruthenians, who joined forces with the insurgent Estonians. In place of the Sakala wooden stronghold a powerful Order Centre was started in 1224. The following year the Grand Master Volquin led the construction of Viljandi Castle at the site of the former hillfort. Viljandi (Fellin) castle was one of the largest in the Baltic region. It was a major fortification of the Livonian Order and was appointed a commander from 1248. The fortress was continually rebuilt and modernized over the next two-hundred years.

In the 13th century, a medieval town arose on the northern side of the stronghold. The Hamburg-Riga town bylaws, lands and population of it were first recorded in 1283. During the first half of the 14th century, Viljandi joined the influential Hanseatic League – the town had become an important stop for merchants on their way to Russia and back. In 1365, the town council was party when peace between Denmark and Hansa was concluded.

In 1470, Johann Wolthus von Herse, then master of the order, took up residence in the castle. In the Middle Ages, Viljandi was a typical small commercial town, which got its main income from transit trade. The local trade and handicraft played an equally important role. In 1481, Ivan III of Russia laid siege to the castle but could not take it. The decline of Viljandi started during the Livonian War and in 1560, the forces of Knyaz Andrey Kurbsky of Muscovite Russia succeeded in seizing and demolished the town and the stronghold.

During the Polish–Russian War in the first quarter of the 17th century, the town and the stronghold were destroyed. Under Swedish rule in the 17th century the town bylaws of Viljandi were cancelled.

After the Great Northern War, Russians seized the power and Viljandi was without laws until the year 1783, when in the course of the regency reforms of Catherine II Viljandi became a district town. This involved the re-establishment of town bylaws. The economic and political importance of Viljandi started to increase. The population, meanwhile, having decreased to the minimum, started to rise again; handicraft, trading and cultural life were enlivened.

In 2005, Estonian Match, the successor of the 100-year-old Viljandi Match Factory, made a six-metre match, which was registered as the largest match in the world in the Guinness Book of Records.

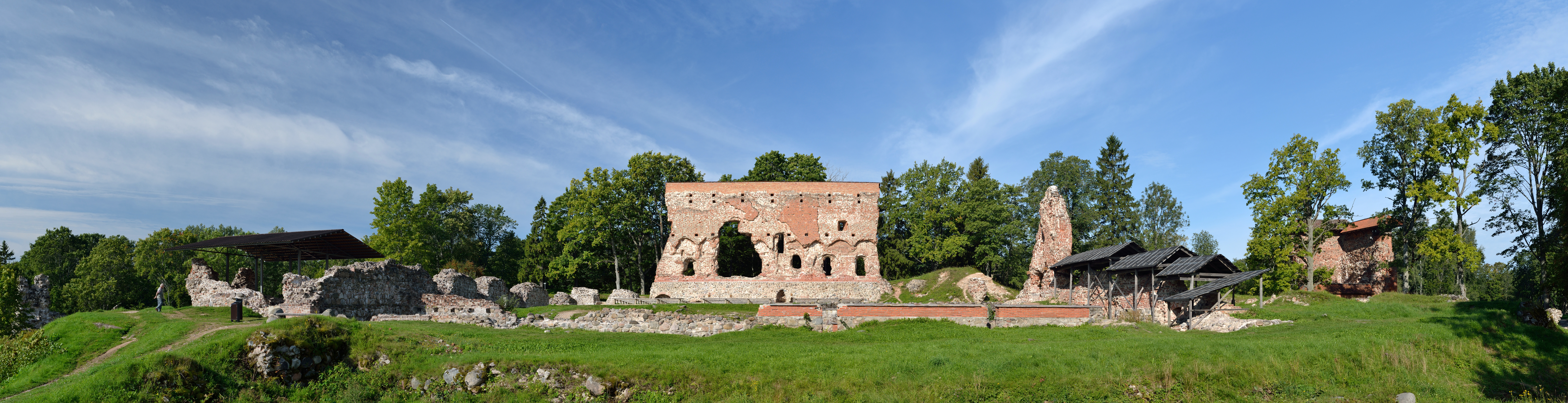
Ruins of Viljandi Castle

== Climate ==
Climate data for Viljandi (normals 1991–2020, extremes 1824–present)
Month	Jan	Feb	Mar	Apr	May	Jun	Jul	Aug	Sep	Oct	Nov	Dec	Year
Record high °C (°F)	9.6 (49.3)	10.5 (50.9)	17.4 (63.3)	27.3 (81.1)	31.1 (88.0)	33.6 (92.5)	34.2 (93.6)	34.5 (94.1)	29.0 (84.2)	21.5 (70.7)	13.7 (56.7)	11.4 (52.5)	34.5 (94.1)
Mean daily maximum °C (°F)	−1.7 (28.9)	−1.5 (29.3)	3.2 (37.8)	10.9 (51.6)	17.2 (63.0)	20.8 (69.4)	23.3 (73.9)	21.8 (71.2)	16.4 (61.5)	9.2 (48.6)	3.3 (37.9)	0.1 (32.2)	10.2 (50.4)
Daily mean °C (°F)	−4.0 (24.8)	−4.4 (24.1)	−0.7 (30.7)	5.6 (42.1)	11.4 (52.5)	15.3 (59.5)	17.9 (64.2)	16.5 (61.7)	11.7 (53.1)	5.9 (42.6)	1.2 (34.2)	−2.0 (28.4)	6.2 (43.2)
Mean daily minimum °C (°F)	−6.4 (20.5)	−7.3 (18.9)	−4.2 (24.4)	0.9 (33.6)	5.6 (42.1)	10.1 (50.2)	12.9 (55.2)	11.9 (53.4)	7.9 (46.2)	3.1 (37.6)	−0.8 (30.6)	−4.1 (24.6)	2.5 (36.5)
Record low °C (°F)	−35.2 (−31.4)	−35.7 (−32.3)	−29.1 (−20.4)	−18 (0)	−5 (23)	−0.9 (30.4)	3.6 (38.5)	1.5 (34.7)	−4.4 (24.1)	−13 (9)	−21.9 (−7.4)	−34.7 (−30.5)	−35.7 (−32.3)
Average precipitation mm (inches)	60 (2.4)	47 (1.9)	40 (1.6)	39 (1.5)	47 (1.9)	84 (3.3)	76 (3.0)	89 (3.5)	61 (2.4)	79 (3.1)	63 (2.5)	62 (2.4)	747 (29.4)
Average precipitation days (≥ 1.0 mm)	13.3	10.4	9.2	8.1	8.2	10.6	10.0	11.4	10.2	12.6	11.9	13.8	129.7
Average relative humidity (%)	90	87	79	69	66	71	75	79	83	88	91	91	81
Source: Estonian Weather Service

== Culture ==
Viljandi is sometimes called the cultural capital of Estonia, partly due to the Viljandi Culture Academy being located there. Ugala Theatre since 1920, Viljandi has had the Ugala drama theatre. The tradition of open-air performances dates back to the same year.

Viljandi Puppet Theatre

Sakala Centre

Viljandi Library built in 2002 is also a venue for exhibitions, meetings with famous people, culture seminars, etc.

Kondas Centre is dedicated to Estonian naïve artist Paul Kondas. The center hosts exhibitions of representatives of naïvism and is also a meeting place for artistic people.

Estonian Traditional Music Centre located in the Traditional Music Storehouse, a restored store house on Kirsimägi in the Castle ruins. The mission of the center is to promote and teach traditional music.

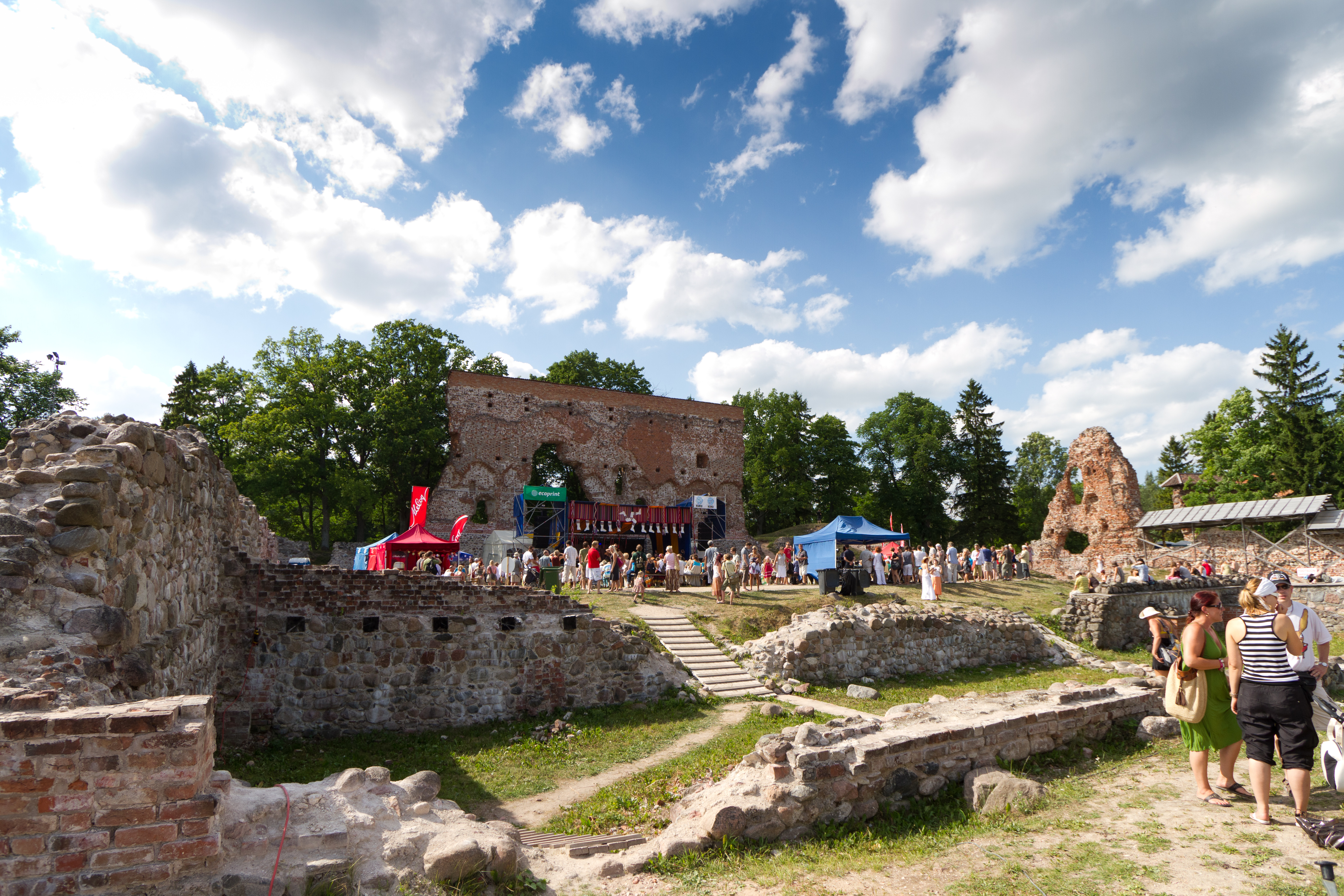
Viljandi Folk Music Festival

== Demographics ==
Ethnic composition 1922-2021
Ethnicity	1922		1934		1941		1959		1970		1979		1989		2000		2011		2021	
Ethnicity	amount	%	amount	%	amount	%	amount	%	amount	%	amount	%	amount	%	amount	%	amount	%	amount	%
Estonians	8667	92.2	10998	93.3	10890	98.0	15422	86.1	17971	86.3	19469	87.0	20093	87.1	18995	91.5	16443	94.1	16230	94.1
Russians	124	1.32	204	1.73	119	1.07	-	-	1912	9.19	2013	9.00	1899	8.23	1085	5.23	648	3.71	508	2.95
Ukrainians	-	-	2	0.02	-	-	-	-	151	0.73	212	0.95	363	1.57	194	0.93	128	0.73	169	0.98
Belarusians	-	-	-	-	-	-	-	-	50	0.24	90	0.40	100	0.43	55	0.26	35	0.20	33	0.19
Finns	-	-	20	0.17	12	0.11	-	-	373	1.79	381	1.70	344	1.49	241	1.16	105	0.60	93	0.54
Jews	131	1.39	121	1.03	0	0.00	-	-	22	0.11	16	0.07	15	0.06	6	0.03	8	0.05	3	0.02
Latvians	-	-	41	0.35	17	0.15	-	-	26	0.12	35	0.16	33	0.14	8	0.04	3	0.02	14	0.08
Germans	332	3.53	345	2.93	-	-	-	-	-	-	54	0.24	49	0.21	10	0.05	7	0.04	17	0.10
Tatars	-	-	0	0.00	-	-	-	-	-	-	9	0.04	14	0.06	8	0.04	6	0.03	6	0.03
Poles	-	-	13	0.11	17	0.15	-	-	-	-	20	0.09	20	0.09	7	0.03	8	0.05	11	0.06
Lithuanians	-	-	6	0.05	1	0.01	-	-	19	0.09	19	0.08	30	0.13	21	0.10	15	0.09	13	0.08
unknown	0	0.00	6	0.05	2	0.02	0	0.00	0	0.00	0	0.00	0	0.00	68	0.33	9	0.05	22	0.13
other	142	1.51	32	0.27	51	0.46	2494	13.9	290	1.39	50	0.22	120	0.52	58	0.28	58	0.33	126	0.73
Total	9396	100	11788	100	11109	100	17916	100	20814	100	22368	100	23080	100	20756	100	17473	100	17245	100

Religion in Viljandi (2021)
1. Unaffiliated (83.4%)
2. Lutheran (9.20%)
3. Orthodox (3.00%)
4. Others Christians (3.10%)
5. Others Religions (0.90%)
6. Unknown (0.40%)

== Geography ==
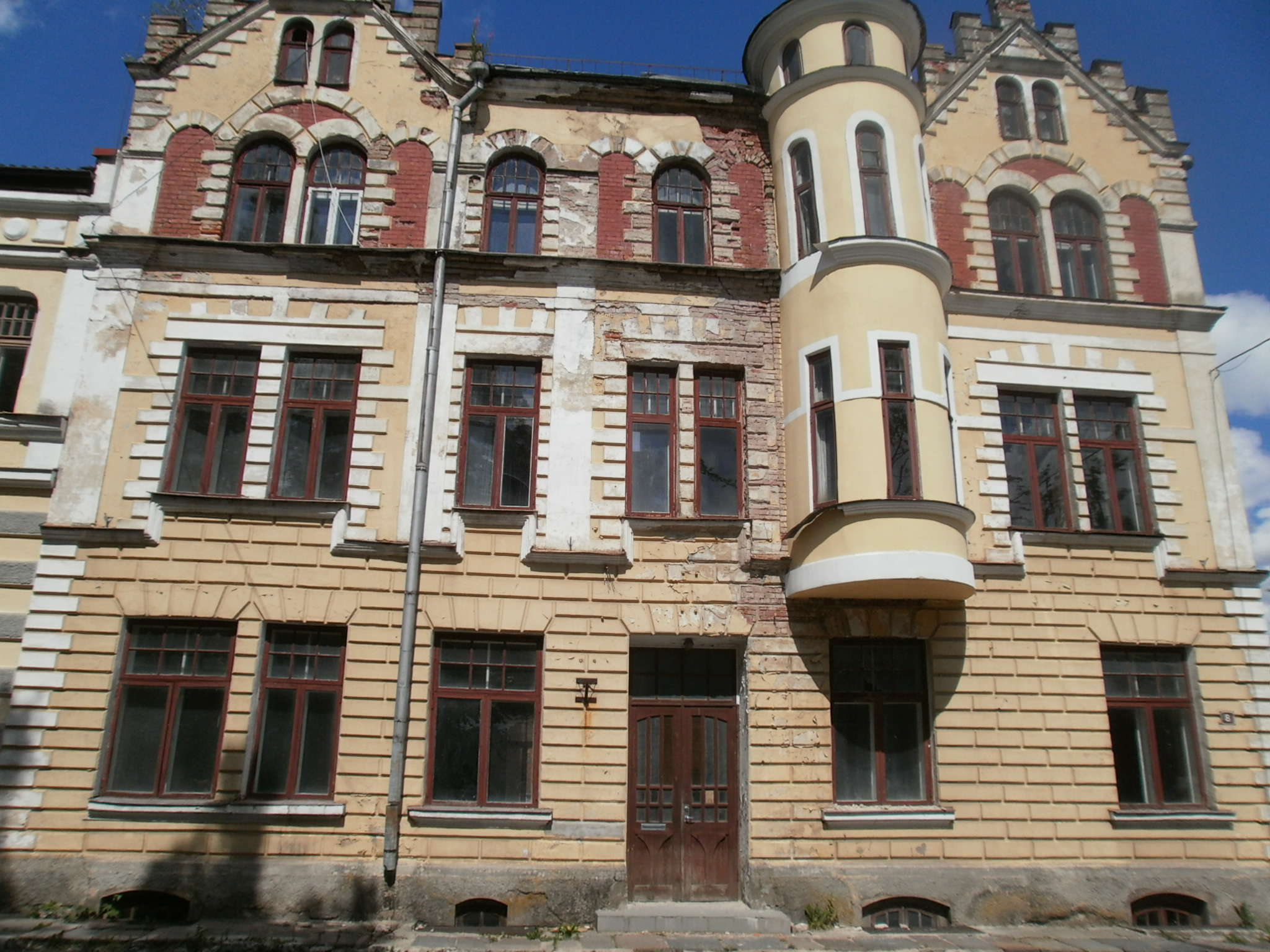
Viljandi Culture School

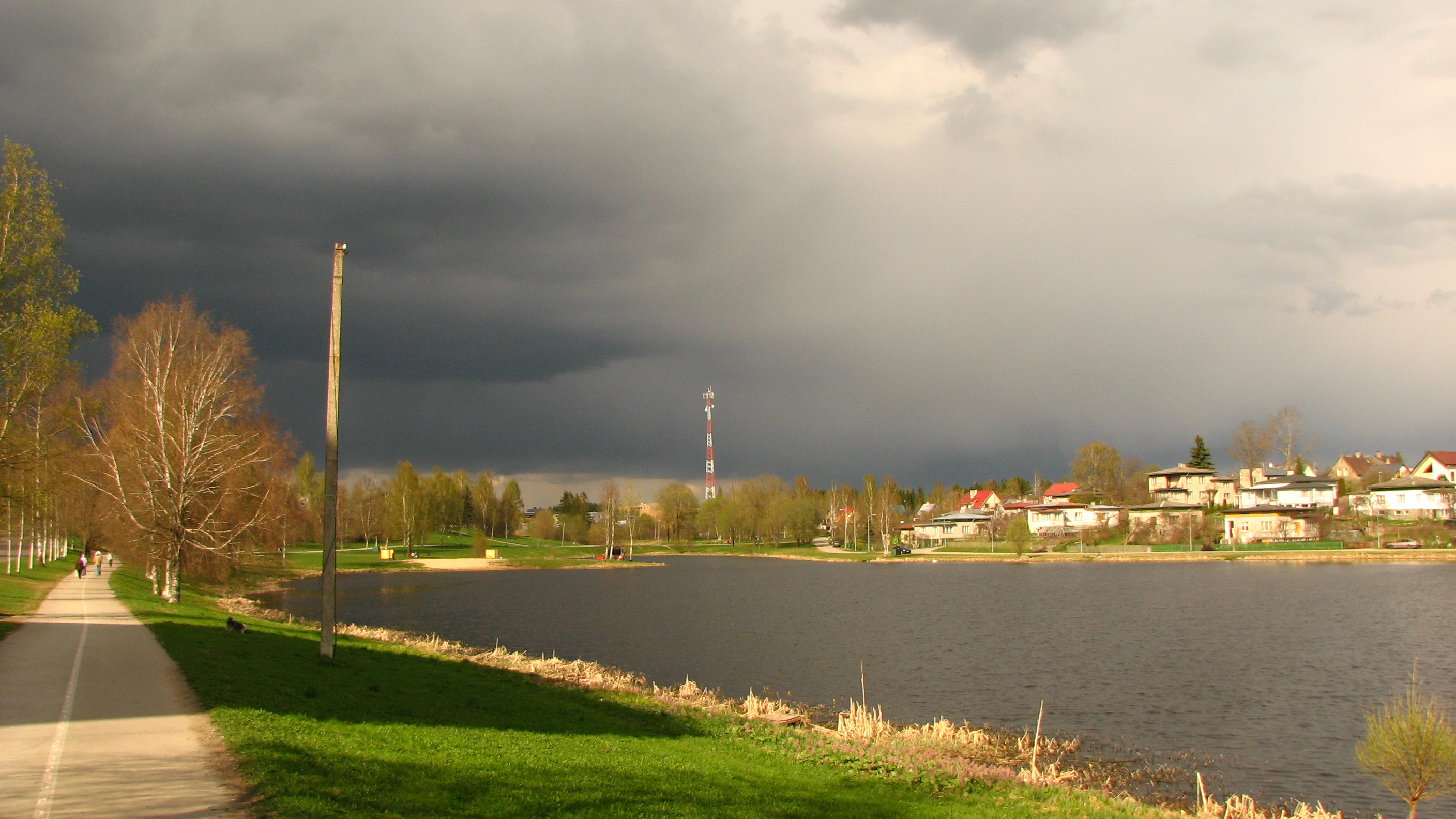
Lake Paala (previously called the Valuoja reservoir) in Viljandi

The city is situated on the north-western shore of Lake Viljandi, which lies in the primeval valley. Green zones cover 27% of the city's area. Public green areas cover about 418 ha, including 92 ha of parks. The largest is the nature-protected Castle Park, but also Valuoja Park, Kiigepark, Uueveski Park are worth mentioning. The main tree species are oak, lime, birch, and pine. The grandest tree-lined avenues are Maramaa (named after August Maramaa, twice the mayor of Viljandi) and Lembitu avenues. Among foreign species, American larch can be found in Köler avenue and Douglas fir in Uus street.

== Economy ==
There were 871 businesses in Viljandi on 1 May 2005, 50% of them in service, 45% in trade, and 5% in production areas. The major industries represented are the construction materials industry, textile industry, and food and bakery industry. In 2005, the Investor of the Year title was awarded to the waterworks operator AS Viljandi Veevärk, the Employer award to AS Toom Tekstiil, and the Sponsor of the Year title to AS Viljandi Metall. Unemployment rate among the working-age population in Viljandi was about 3%.

== Transport ==
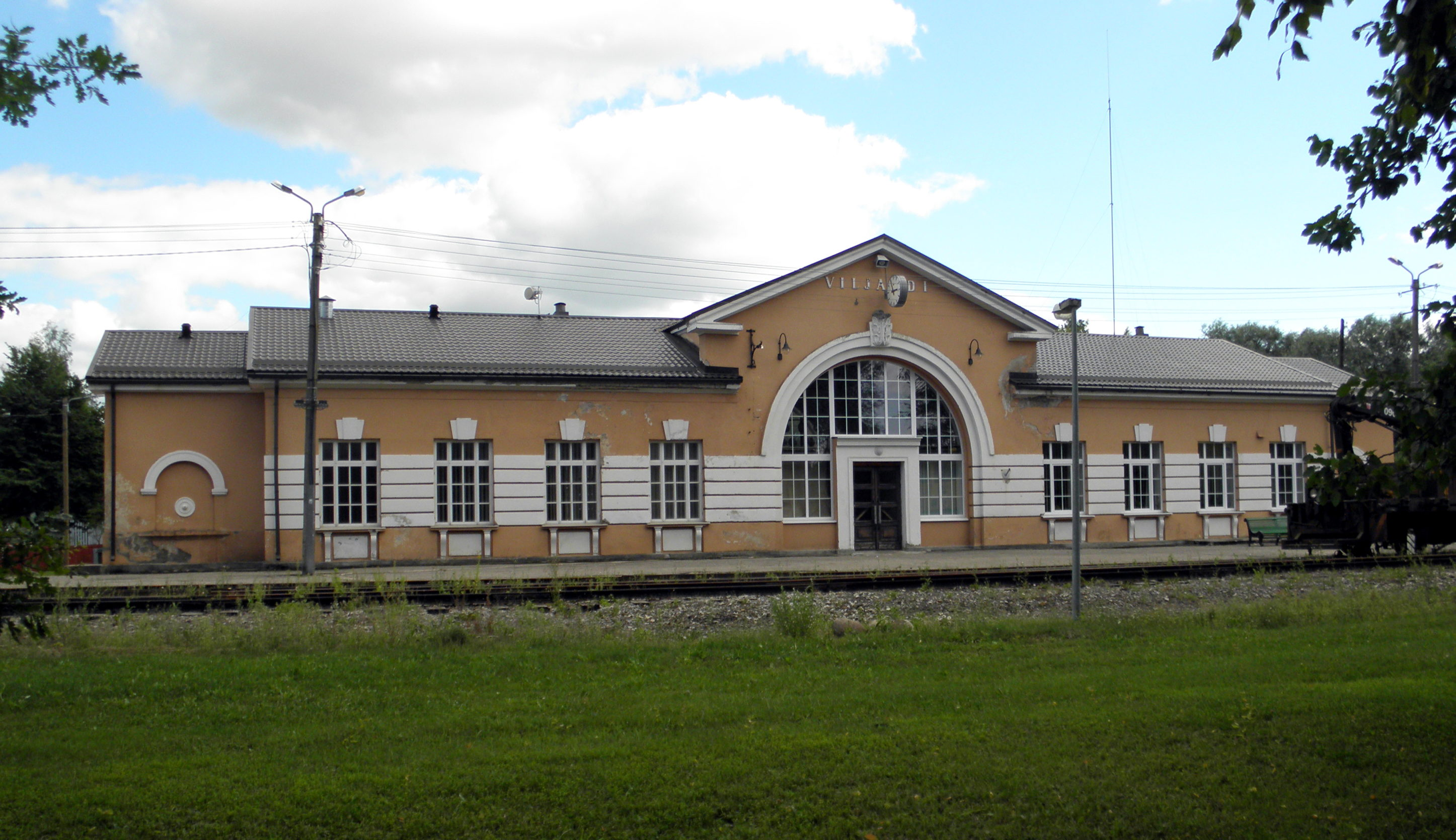
Viljandi railway station

The city is served by the Viljandi railway station, which was opened in 1897. Government-owned passenger train operator Elron runs multiple daily trains to the capital Tallinn. From 1897 to 1973, an additional narrow-gauge track connected the city to Southern border town of Mõisaküla and the Western coastal city of Pärnu.

National Road 92, running from Tartu to Kilingi-Nõmme, passes through the city.

Viljandi Airfield (ICAO: EEVI), operated by the local flight club, is located in Päri, Viljandi Parish, but does not have any regular passenger flights. During the Soviet occupation, Aeroflot used to operate Tartu-Viljandi-Pärnu-Kingissepa (now Kuressaare) services using Antonov An-2 biplanes.

== Education ==
There are 7 schools and 7 kindergartens in Viljandi, a vocational secondary school and a university college. Special interests are catered for by a variety of institution providing extracurricular studies and activities in such fields as sports, music etc. The Youth Centre of Viljandi County is successful in offering various information and consulting services.

=== Schools in Viljandi ===
Primary Schools

- Viljandi Jakobsoni Kool
- Viljandi Kesklinna Kool
- Viljandi Paalalinna Kool
- Viljandi Kaare Kool
- Viljandi Vaba Waldorfkool

Grammar Schools

- Viljandi Gümnaasium
- Viljandi Täiskasvanute Gümnaasium

=== Vocational education ===
Vocational education can be acquired at Viljandi Joint Vocational Secondary School.

=== Higher education ===
Higher and applied higher education can be acquired at Viljandi Culture Academy a college of the University of Tartu.

=== Extracurricular educational institutions ===
- Viljandi Music School
- Viljandi Sports School
- Viljandi Art School
- Viljandi Youth Hobby Centre

== Sports ==
There are sports events in Viljandi for both top athletes and amateurs. Family sports events, Sunday skiing trips, cycling tours in spring and autumn are very popular. In the city there are 53 sports clubs, a large sports hall and the new sports hall of Maagümnaasium. Also, the country's first artificial speed skating oval was opened in 2014. Soon, the jogging and cycling track around Lake Viljandi will be completed. A new skateboarding and roller-skating area has been built in Männimäe. At the lakeside are tennis courts and the city stadium.

Several races are held in Viljandi – around Lake Viljandi and Lake Paala and up and down the Trepimägi stairs. The longest tradition – the race around Lake Viljandi has been organised since 1928. This race takes place annually on 1 May, with the number of participants being about 1300 in the recent years. The winners' names are cut into stone columns. The legendary Hubert Pärnakivi, whose monument is also a tribute to the race, was an 11-time winner of the race.

Other popular fields of sport in Viljandi are handball, football, volleyball, basketball, wrestling, archery and rowing.

== Legends ==
=== Boatman of Viljandi ===
The song typically follows the legend of the Boatman of Viljandi, where when he was a young man, he fell in love with a young girl as he took a young girl across a lake on a summer evening. It is unknown what happened as the two crossed the lake, but as the couple finished crossing, the girl simply waved goodbye and left, leaving the Boatman rowing across the lake as an old man, hoping to one day see the girl's blue eyes again.

According to another story, it was a boatman from Gauja who had dedicated a song to his loved one. As the young woman had moved near Viljandi, the song had changed, too.

== International relations ==
Viljandi as an historic Hanseatic town is a member of the international City League the Hanse.

=== Twin towns – sister cities ===
Viljandi is twinned with:

- Ahrensburg, Germany
- Cumberland, United States
- Eslöv, Sweden
- Frostburg, United States
- Härnösand, Sweden
- Kretinga, Lithuania
- Porvoo, Finland
- (Georgia (country)) Telavi, Georgia
- Ternopil, Ukraine
- Valmiera, Latvia
- Thirlmere, Australia

== Events ==
- Viljandi Folk Music Festival a music festival with a focus on European folk music. It is traditionally held in the end of July. In the year 2006, over 24,000 people attended the concerts. As such, it is the largest annual music festival in Estonia. Due to this, Viljandi is sometimes called the Estonian Capital of Folk Music. In 2026 Viljandi folk had 38 000 visits.
- Early Music Festival
- Notafe Festival – originally 'Noore Tantsu (Young Dance) Festival' : Annual experimental theater festival founded in 1993, traditionally held in mid July.
- Winter Folk Dance Festival
- "Theatre in Suitcase" puppet theatre festival
- Rock Ramp Festival. In 2013, the 7th festival was held. In 2014, last Rock Ramp took place.
- Viljandi Hanseatic Days are traditionally held in June every year. The program covers different activities and events like a Hanseatic fair, where people can buy and sell traditional goods. The Viljandi Hanseatic Days also offer concerts and live performances from local and foreign performers. Different workshops are opened. Medieval sports games take place by the Lake Viljandi.
- International Hanseatic Days will be held in Viljandi from 2015.
- Grand Race around Lake Viljandi

== Notable residents ==
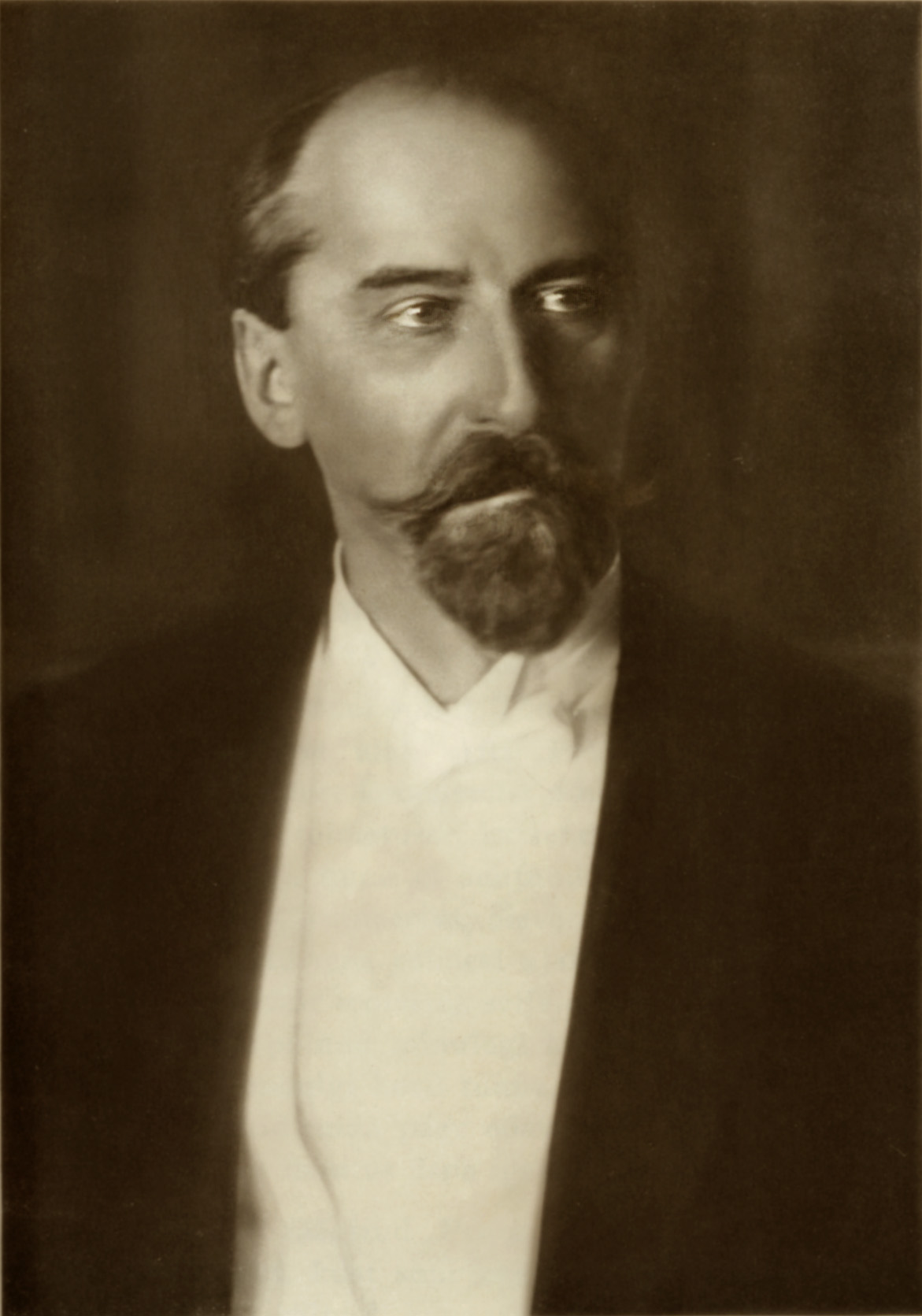
Jaan Tõnisson, 1928

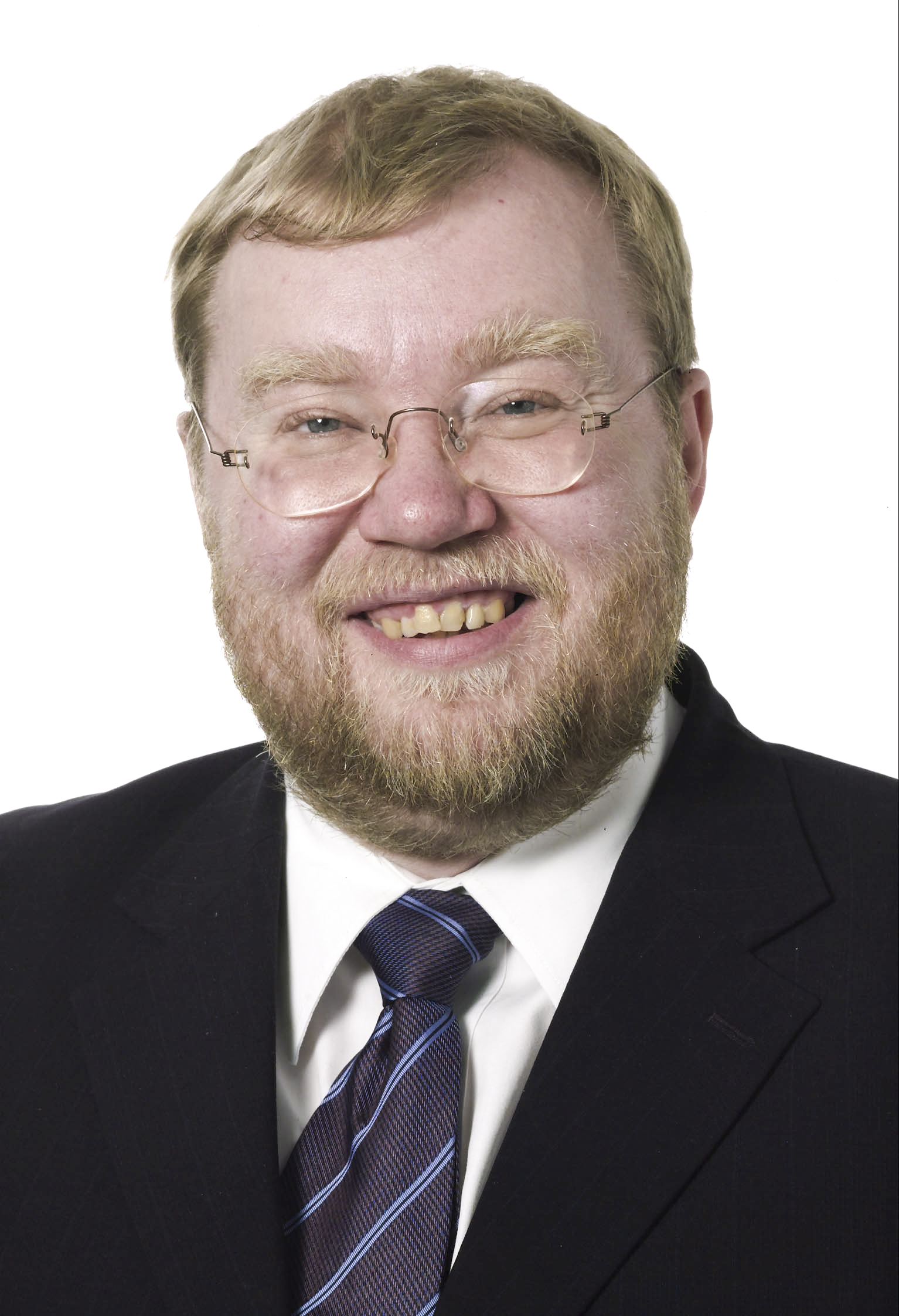
Mart Laar, 2003

- Dionysius Fabricius (1564–1617), chronicler and cleric during the Polish rule
- Franz Burchard Dörbeck (1799–1835), Baltic-German caricaturist and painter
- Carl Robert Jakobson (1841–1882), writer, politician, teacher and journalist
- Jaan Tõnisson (1868–1941), politician and journalist, Prime Minister of Estonia, 1919/1920, State Elder of Estonia, 1927/1928 and in 1933
- Friedrich Akel (1871–1941), politician, State Elder of Estonia in 1924
- Elisabeth Schiemann (1881–1972), German geneticist and crop scientist
- Johan Laidoner (1884–1953), Commander of the Estonian Defence Forces and statesman
- Joakim Puhk (1888–1942), entrepreneur and sports official
- August Alle (1890–1952), author, a master of the epigram and sketches.
- Aksel Kipper (1907–1984), astrophysicist
- Tõnis Rätsep (born 1947), Estonian actor, musician, playwright, educator and local politician
- Kaido Kama (born 1957), politician and government minister
- Mart Laar (born 1960), historian and politician, Prime Minister of Estonia, 1992 to 1994 & 1999 to 2002.
- Jaak Aab (born 1960), politician, former mayor of Võhma
- Indrek Taalmaa (born 1967), stage, TV, voice and film actor, and theatre director
- Liisa Aibel (born 1972), stage, film and TV actress.
- Triinu Kivilaan (born 1989), former bassist of the band Vanilla Ninja

=== Sport ===
- August Eller (1907–1990), chess player, won the Estonian Chess Championship in 1944
- Sander Post (born 1984), footballer, played over 370 games and 12 for Estonia
- Ragnar Klavan (born 1985), footballer, played 530 games and 130 for Estonia
- Joonas Tamm (born 1992), footballer, played over 360 games and 67 for Estonia
- Karol Mets (born 1993), footballer, played over 480 games and 104 for Estonia

== Gallery ==
Panoramic view of the town

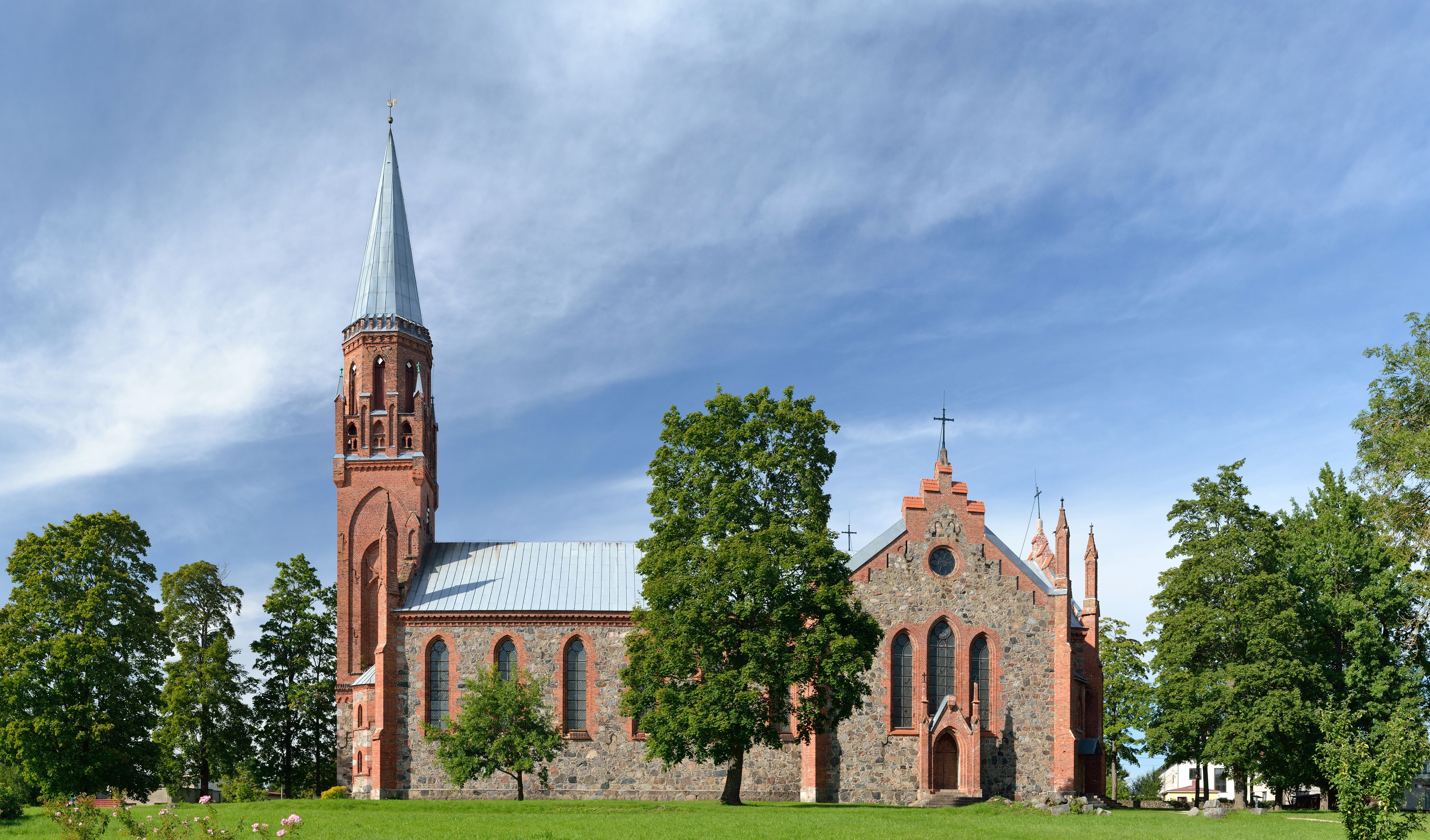
St. Paul's church (Pauluse kirik)

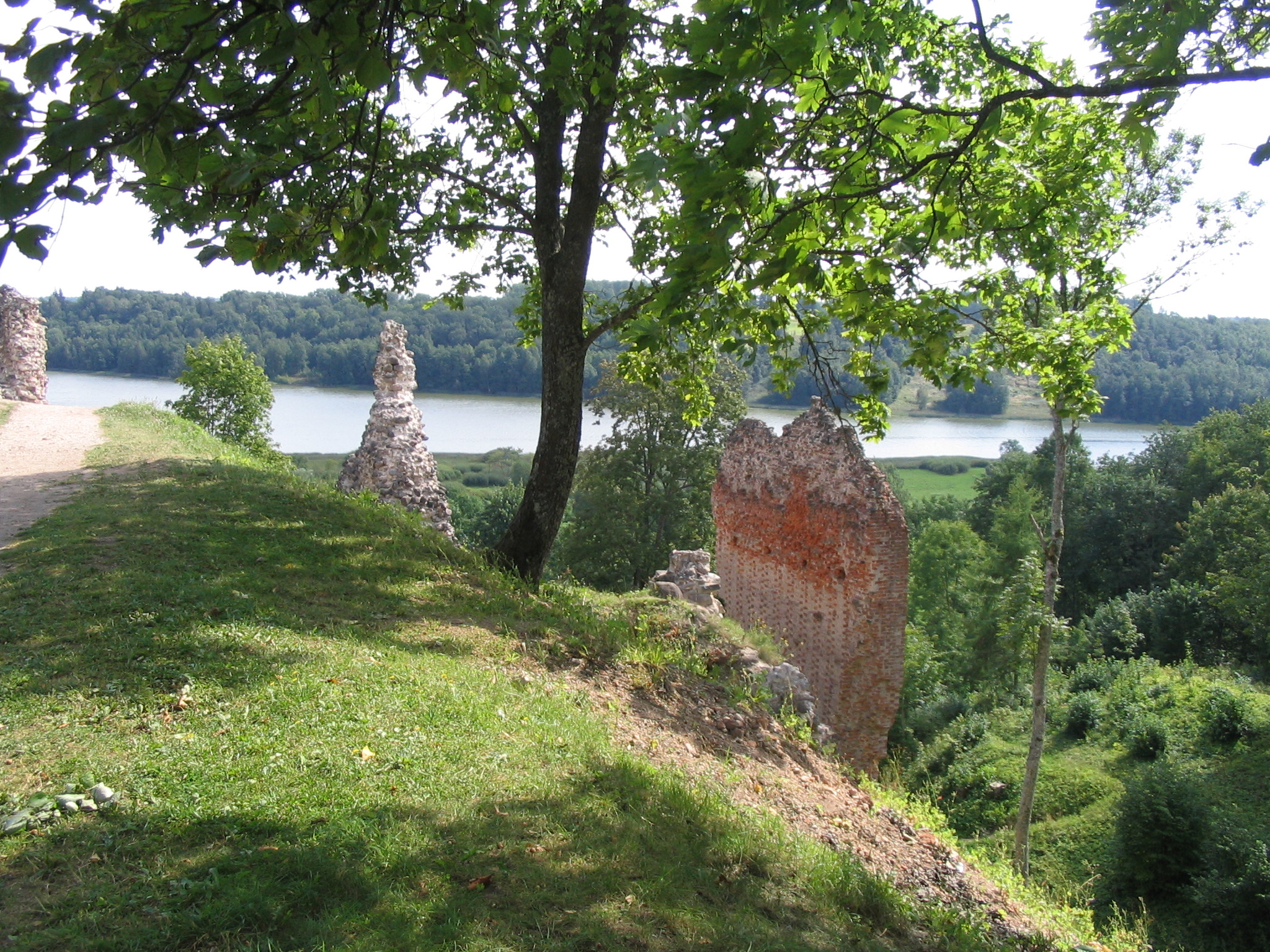
Viljandi castle. Ruins at the southern end of the hill with Lake Viljandi in the background

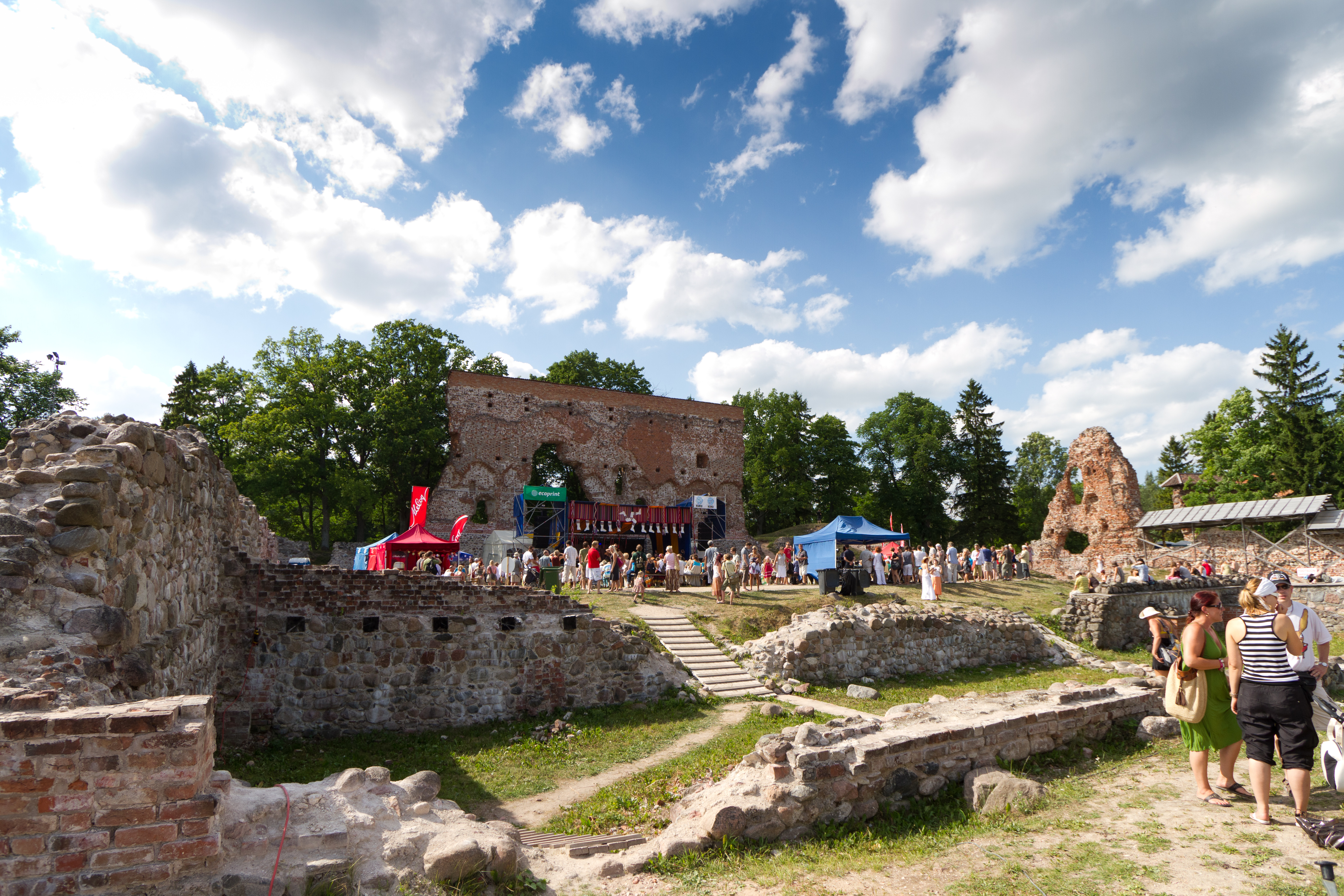
Viljandi Folk Music Festival held annually within the castle ruins

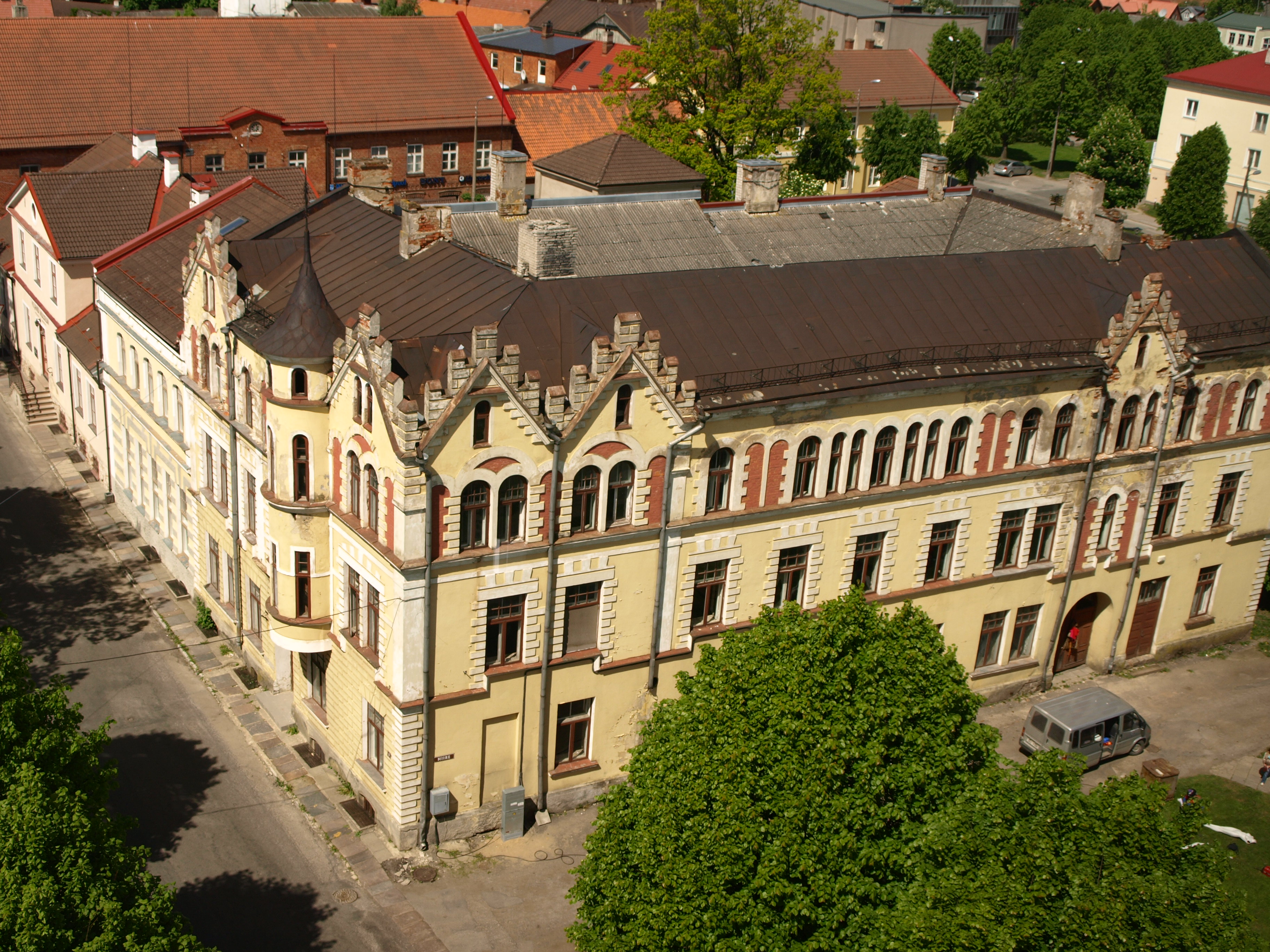
Viljandi Town Heritage Conservation Area

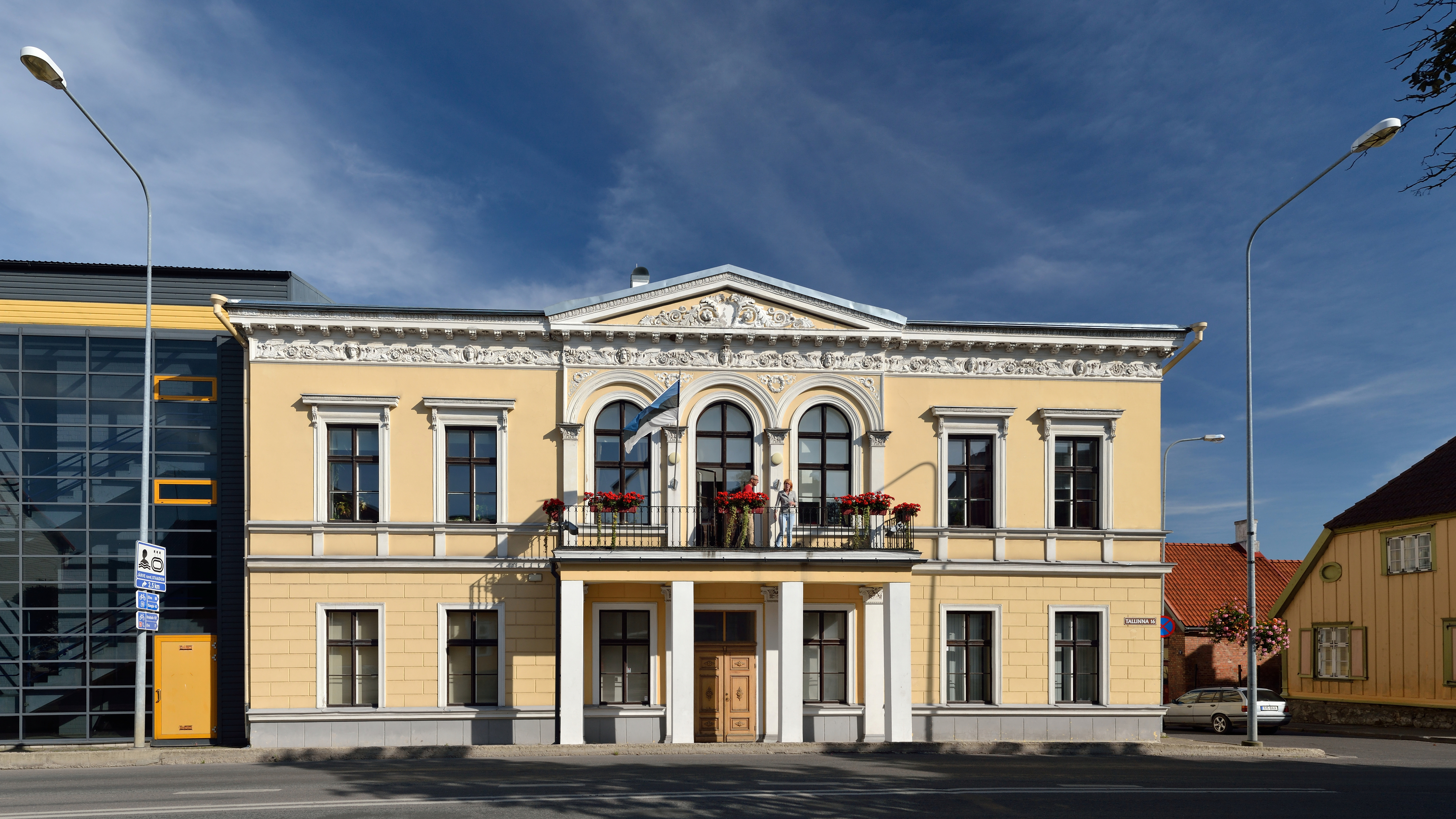
Main building of University of Tartu Viljandi Culture Academy on Tallinna tänav 16 in Viljandi

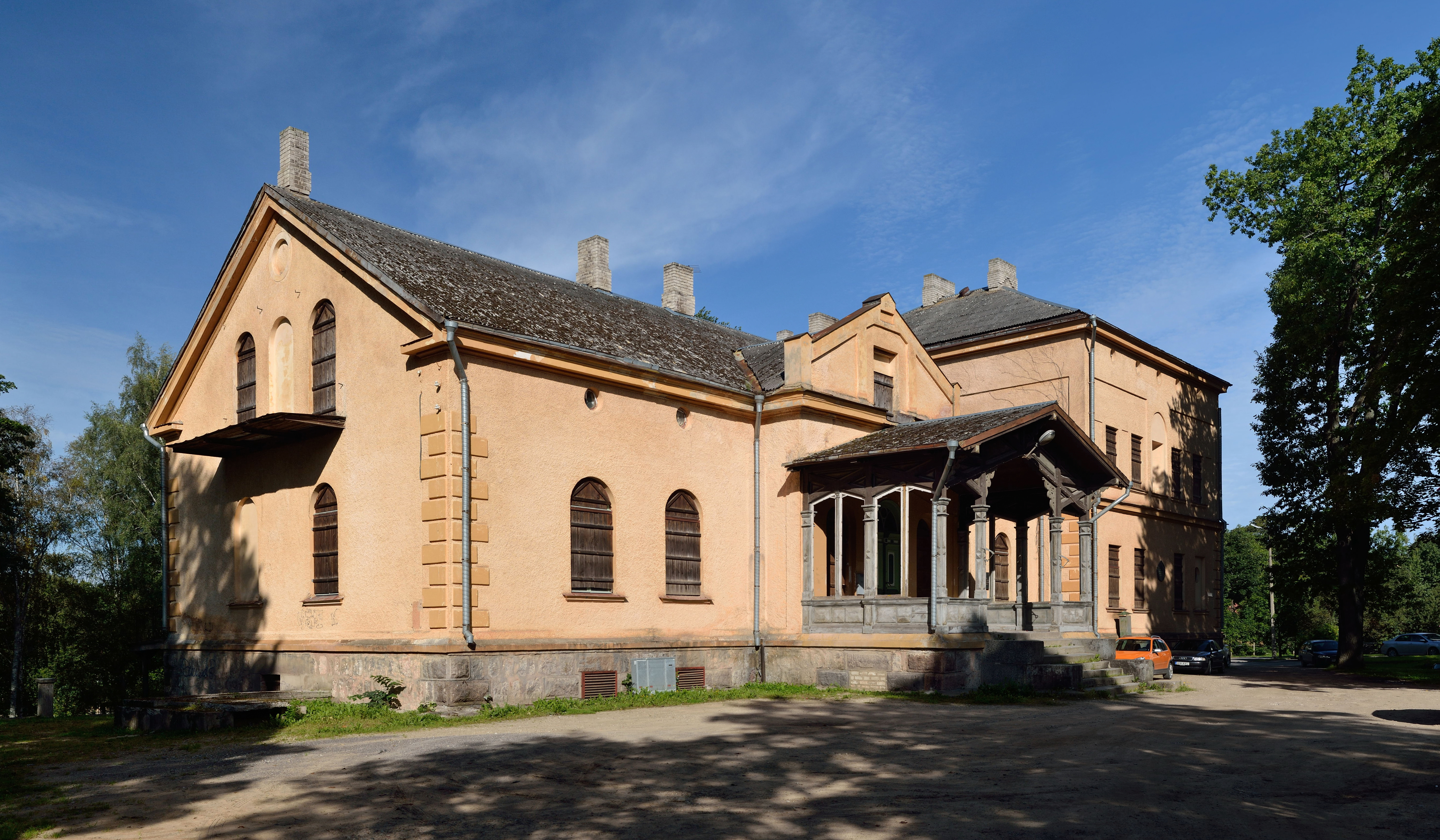
Viljandi manor main building

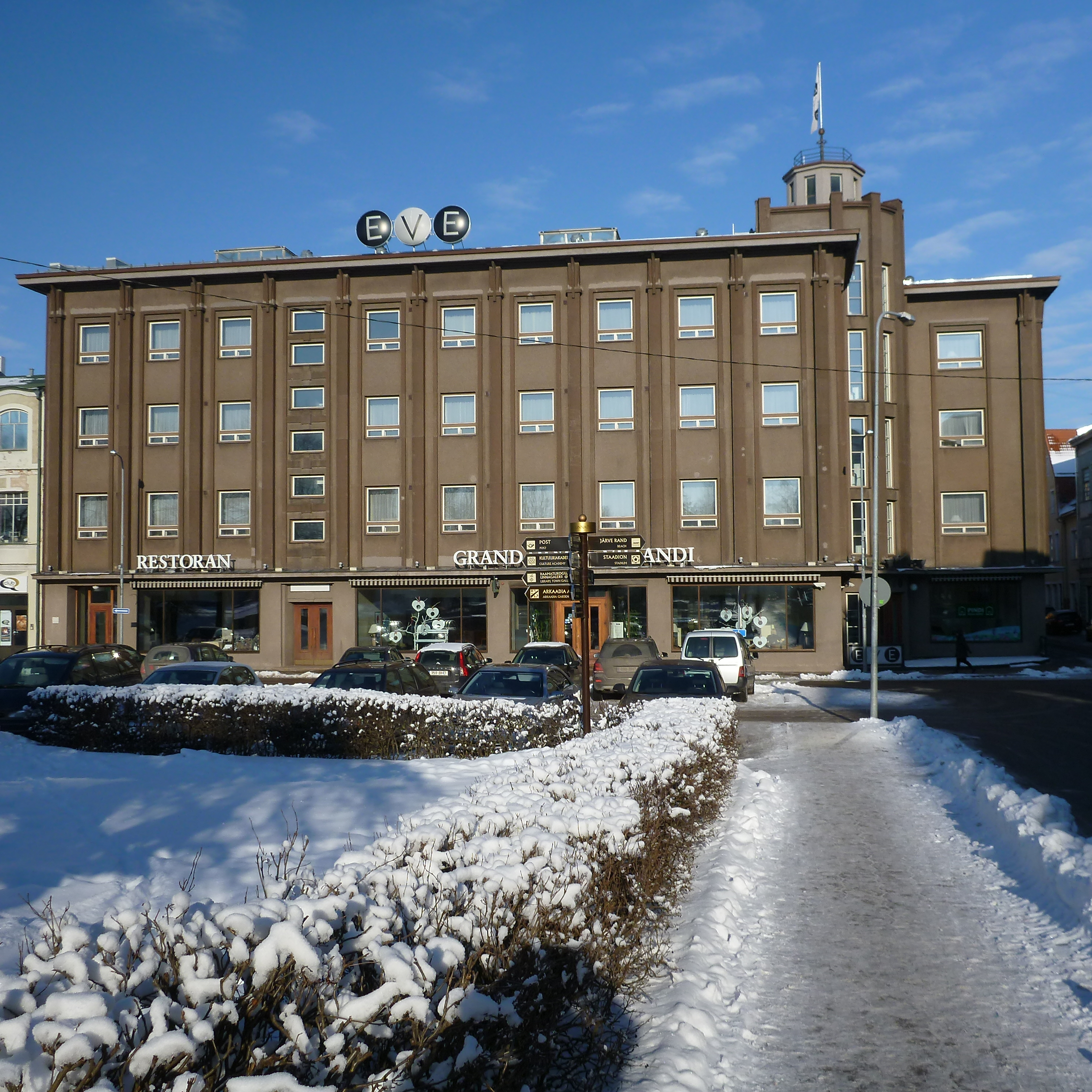
Grand Hotel Viljandi

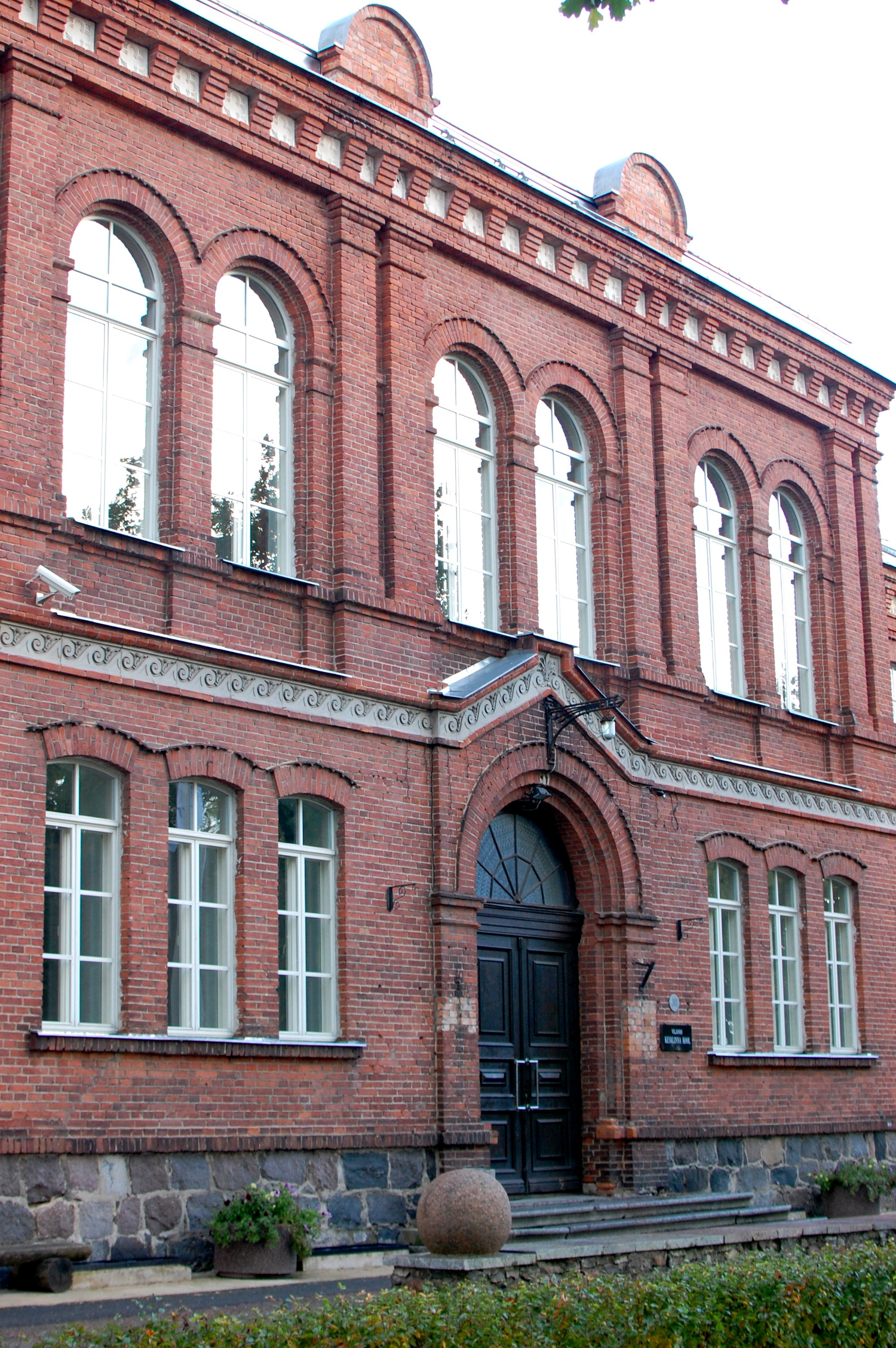
Main building of Viljandi Gümnaasium

== See also ==
- Lake Viljandi
- Viljandi castle
- University of Tartu Viljandi Culture Academy
