= Raudna (river) =

River in Estonia

Raudna River
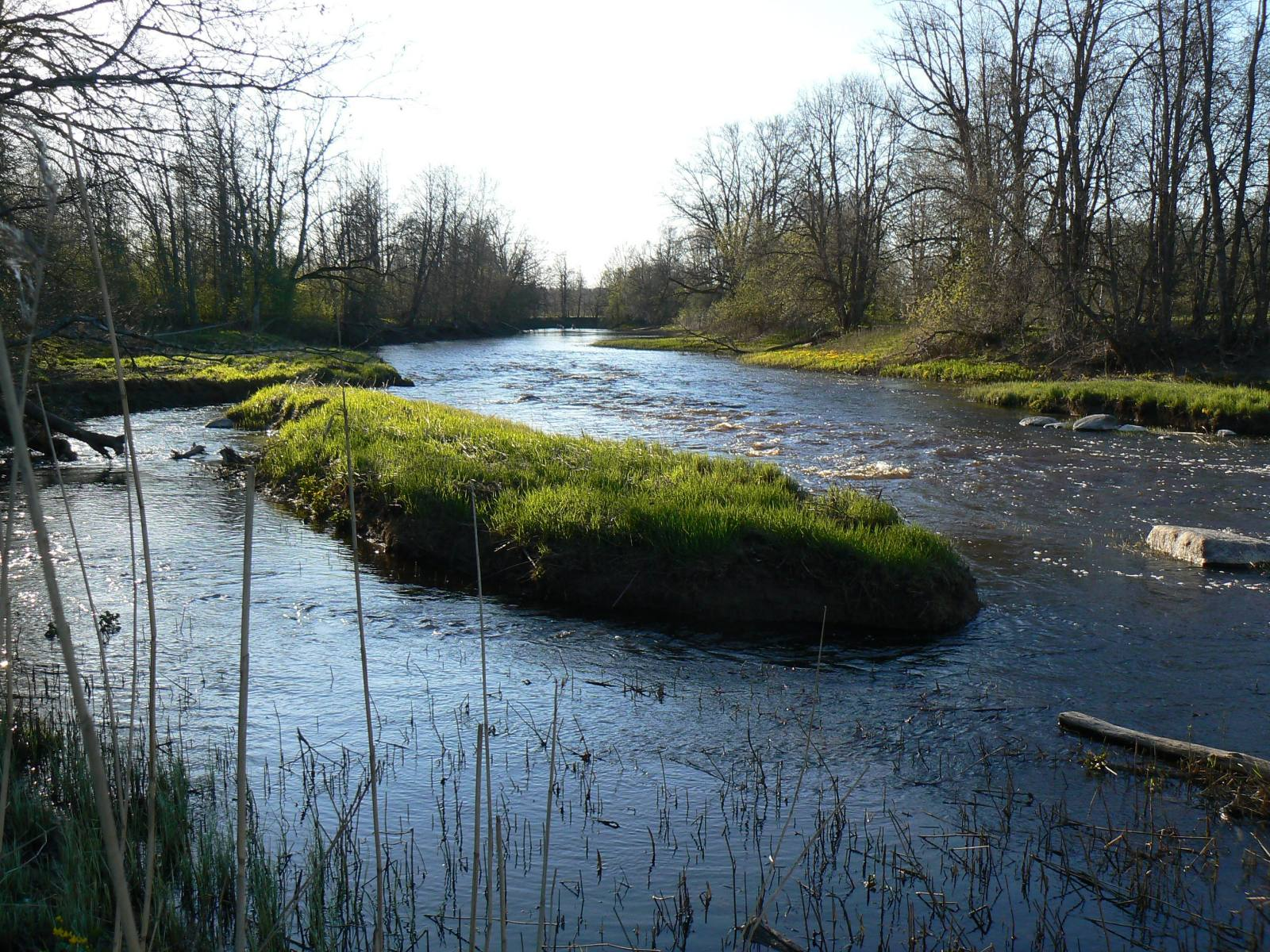

Location
- Country: Estonia

Physical characteristics
- Source: Viljandi Lake
  - coordinates: 58°20′00″N 25°34′38″E
- Mouth: Halliste River
  - coordinates: 58°27′44″N 24°59′12″E
- Length: 68.6 km (42.6 mi)
- Basin size: 1,122.5 km^{2} (433.4 sq mi)

The Raudna River is river in Estonia in Viljandi County. The river is 68.6 km long, and its basin size is 1122.5 km^{2}. It runs from Lake Viljandi to the Halliste River.

Trout and grayling live in the river.
