= Lake Viljandi =

Lake in Viljandi County, Estonia

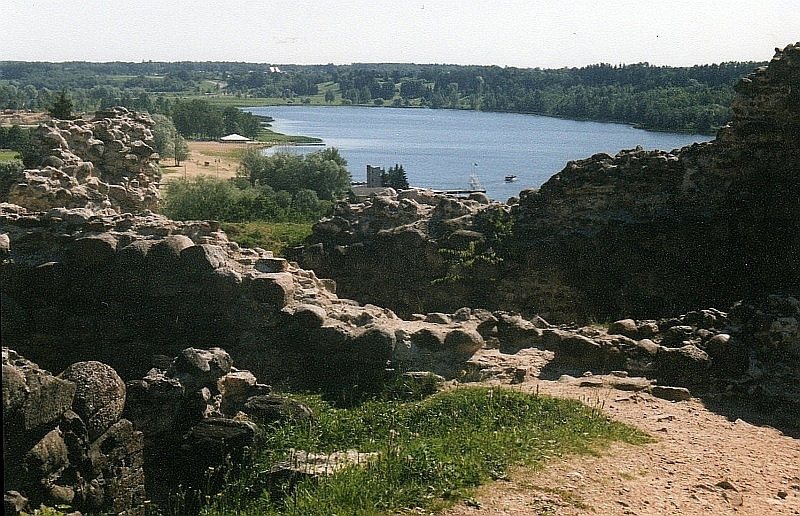
- View from the ruins of Viljandi Castle

- Location within Estonia
- Location: Viljandi County
- Coordinates: 58°21′0″N 25°35′35″E
- Primary inflows: Valuoja, Uueveski Creek
- Primary outflows: Raudna
- Basin countries: Estonia
- Max. length: 4.33 km (2.69 mi)
- Max. width: 435 m (1,427 ft)
- Surface area: 1.58 km^{2} (0.61 sq mi)
- Max. depth: 11 m (36 ft)
- Surface elevation: 42.35 m (138.9 ft)
- Settlements: Viljandi

Lake Viljandi (Estonian: Viljandi järv) is a lake in Viljandi County, Estonia. The lake lies in a deep valley below the town of Viljandi. It has a depth of 11 m (36 ft), length of 4.6 km (2.9 mi), width of 400 m (1,300 ft), and area of 1.55 km^{2} (0.60 sq mi). Uueveski and Valuoja creeks and a number of springs flow into the lake. The Raudna River flows from the southwestern part of the lake. The main fish in the lake are bream, roach, perch, and pike. The lake and its shores make up the Viljandi landscape protection area.

The Grand Race around Lake Viljandi is held annually.

== Gallery ==
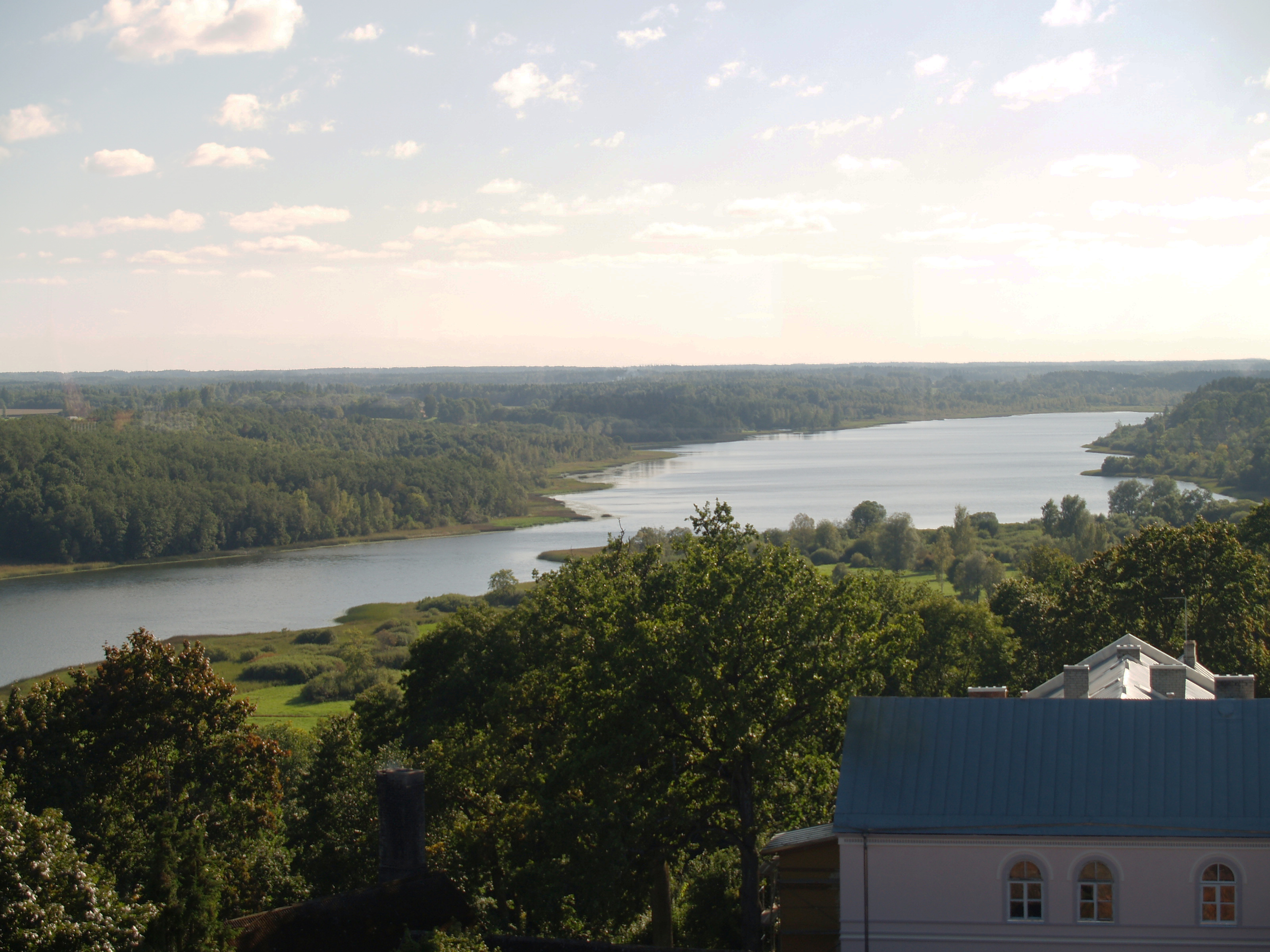

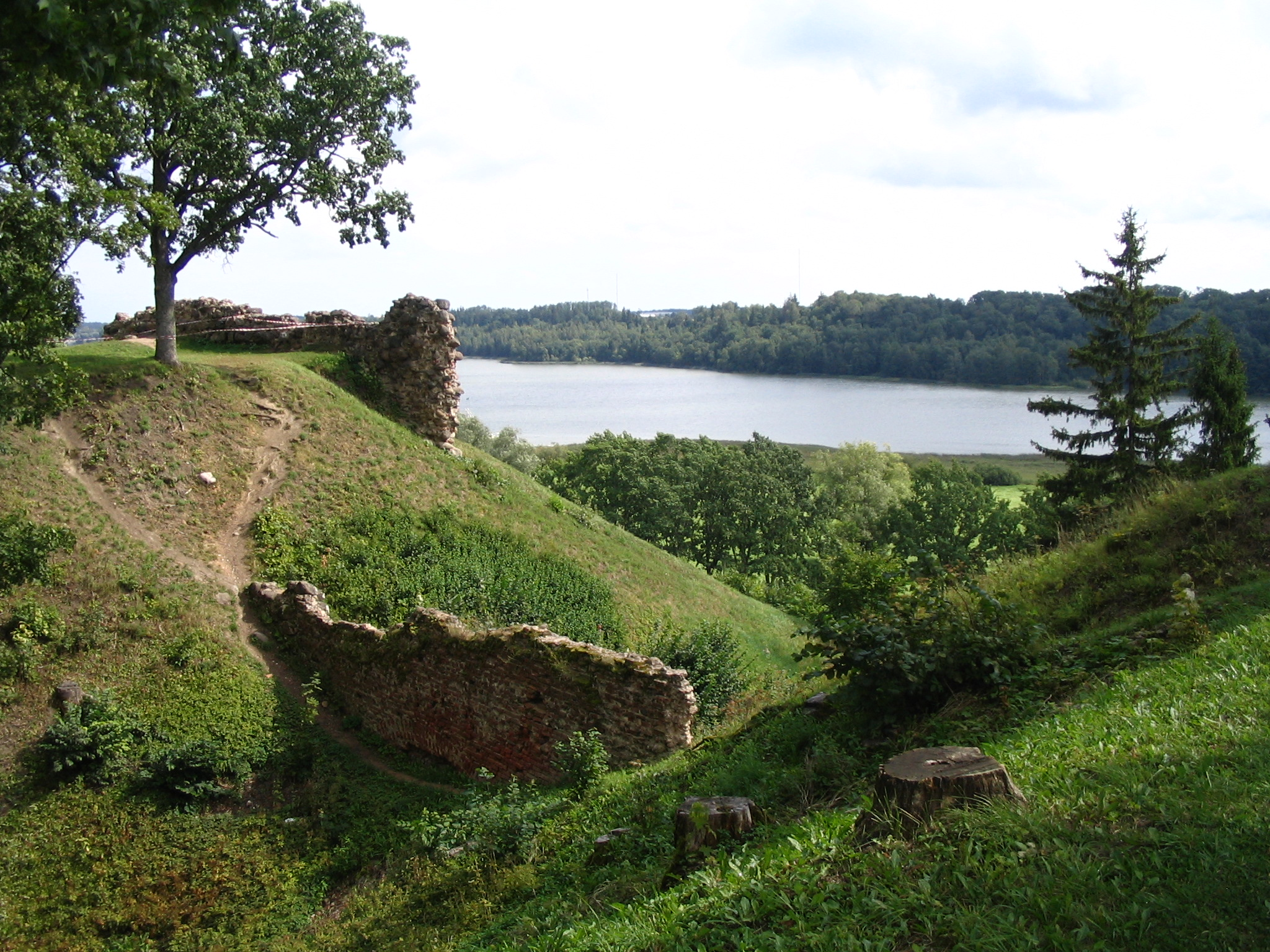
