= Viljandi Castle =

Castle in Estonia

Coordinates: 58°21′33″N 25°35′42″E

A reconstruction of the castle

Drone footage of the castle. July 2021

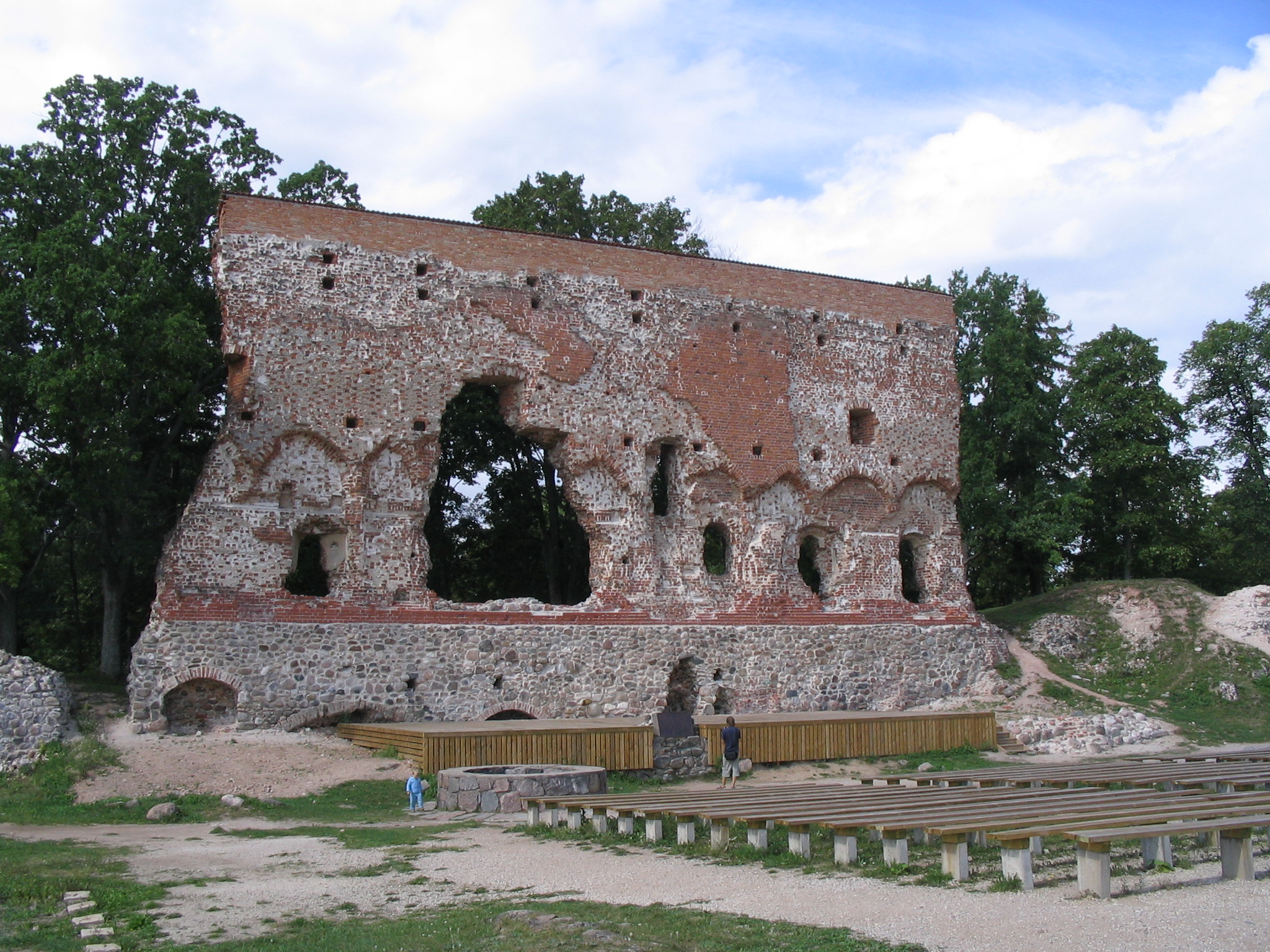
A wall of the former convent house of Viljandi Castle

Viljandi Castle (Estonian: Viljandi ordulinnus, German: Ordensburg Fellin) is 13th Century castle in a Viljandi, Estonia. It was built by the Livonian Order, and construction started in 1224 in place of a former hillfort, which was one of the strongest castles in Livonia. Finally destroyed in the Polish-Swedish wars during the early 17th century, its ruins still stand near the town centre.

== History ==
After initial setback in the battle of Viljandi in 1223, the crusaders of Sword Brethren conquered the hillfort at the place where the main castle was later built. Construction of stone fortifications started in 1224. Viljandi was chosen as the high seat of the order.

The convent house, a typical form of castle of Teutonic Knights, was erected in the late 13th to the early 14th century. In the following centuries the castle was extended and fortified further. It was badly damaged in the Polish-Swedish wars in the early 17th century and not repaired any more. In the 18th century, the ruins were used for quarrying stones for construction work in Viljandi.

The first excavations in the castle were performed in 1878–1879. In recent decades, these have turned to almost yearly events.

Currently the ruins form a popular resort area just outside central Viljandi. An open-air stage is located in the former central courtyard.

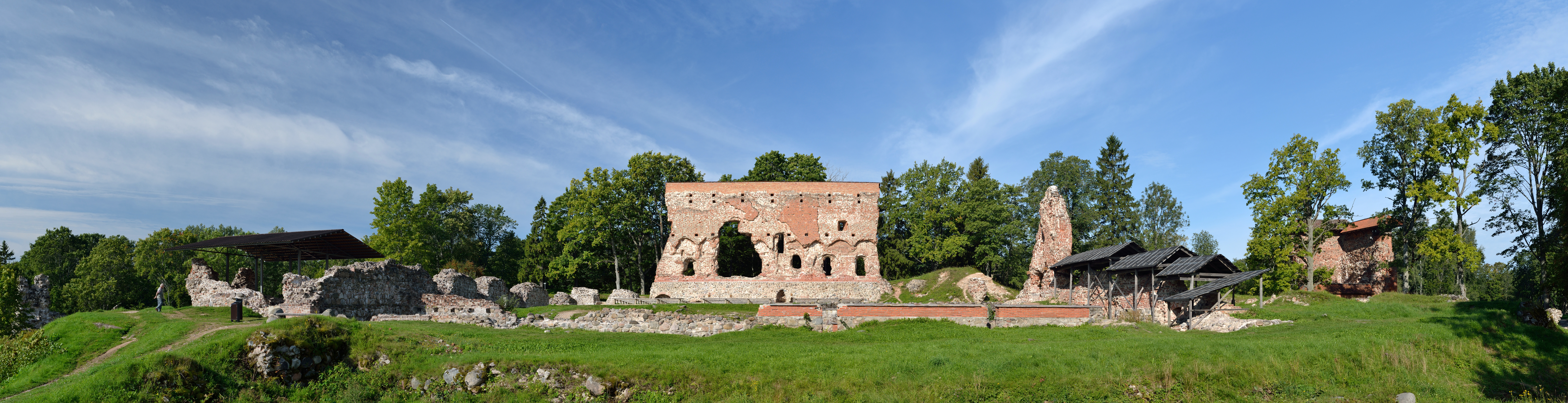
Ruins of Viljandi castle

== See also ==
- List of castles in Estonia
