= Evelin Talts =

Estonian long-distance runner

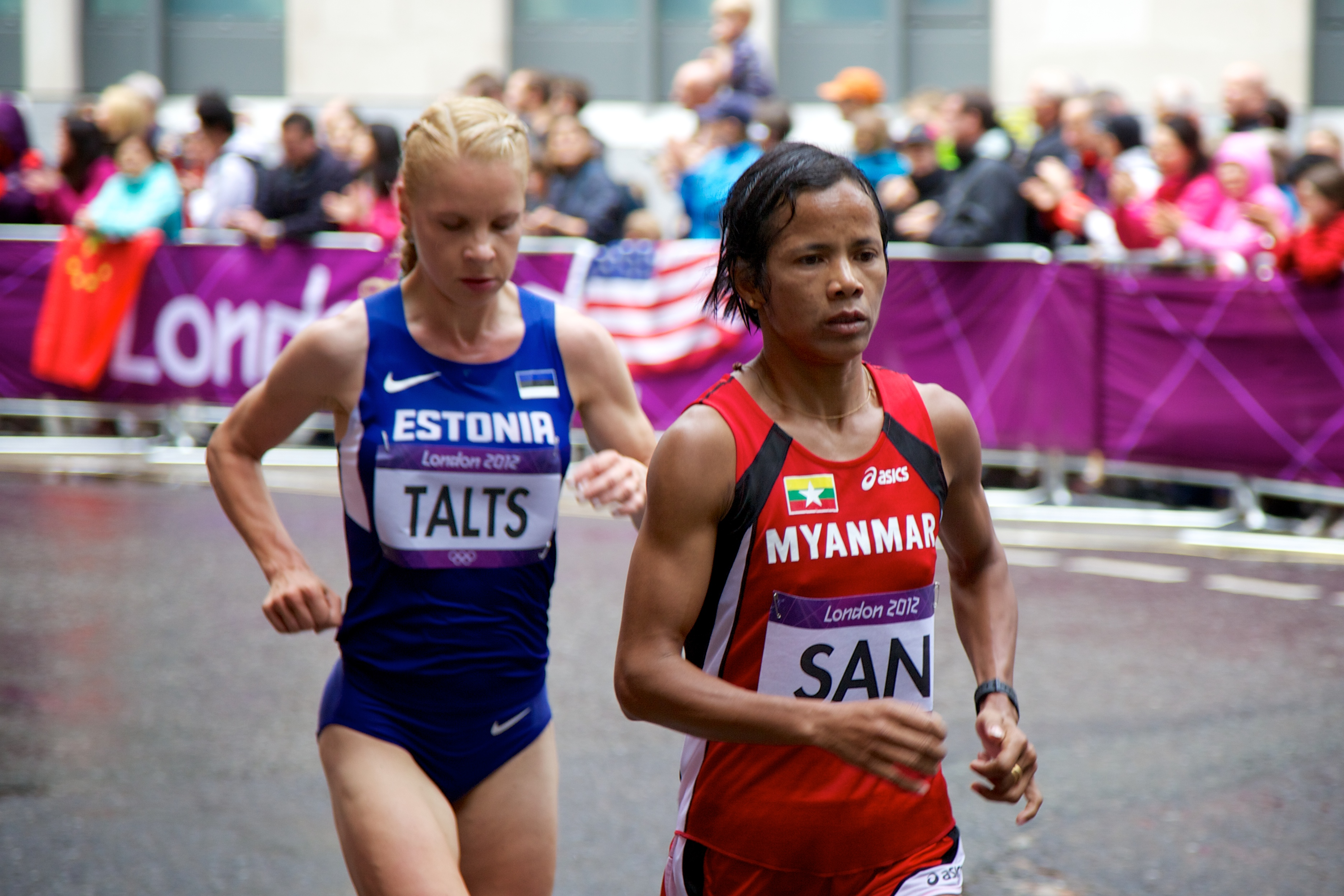
- Evelin Talts (left) with Ni Lar San at the Women's marathon in London 2012.

Personal information
- Born: 18 May 1977 (age 48)
- Height: 1.58 m (5 ft 2 in)
- Weight: 54 kg (119 lb)

Sport
- Country: Estonia
- Sport: Athletics
- Event: Marathon

Evelin Talts (née Evelin Kärner; born 18 May 1977) is an Estonian long-distance runner. Talts was born in Tallinn. She competed in the marathon at the 2012 Summer Olympics, placing 103rd with a time of 2:54:15. In 2012 and 2014 she won the Tallinn Marathon.
