= Noarootsi Parish =

Former municipality of Estonia

Coordinates: 59°00′N 23°31′E

Noarootsi Parish Noarootsi vald (in Estonian) Nuckö kommun (in Swedish)
- Former municipality of Estonia
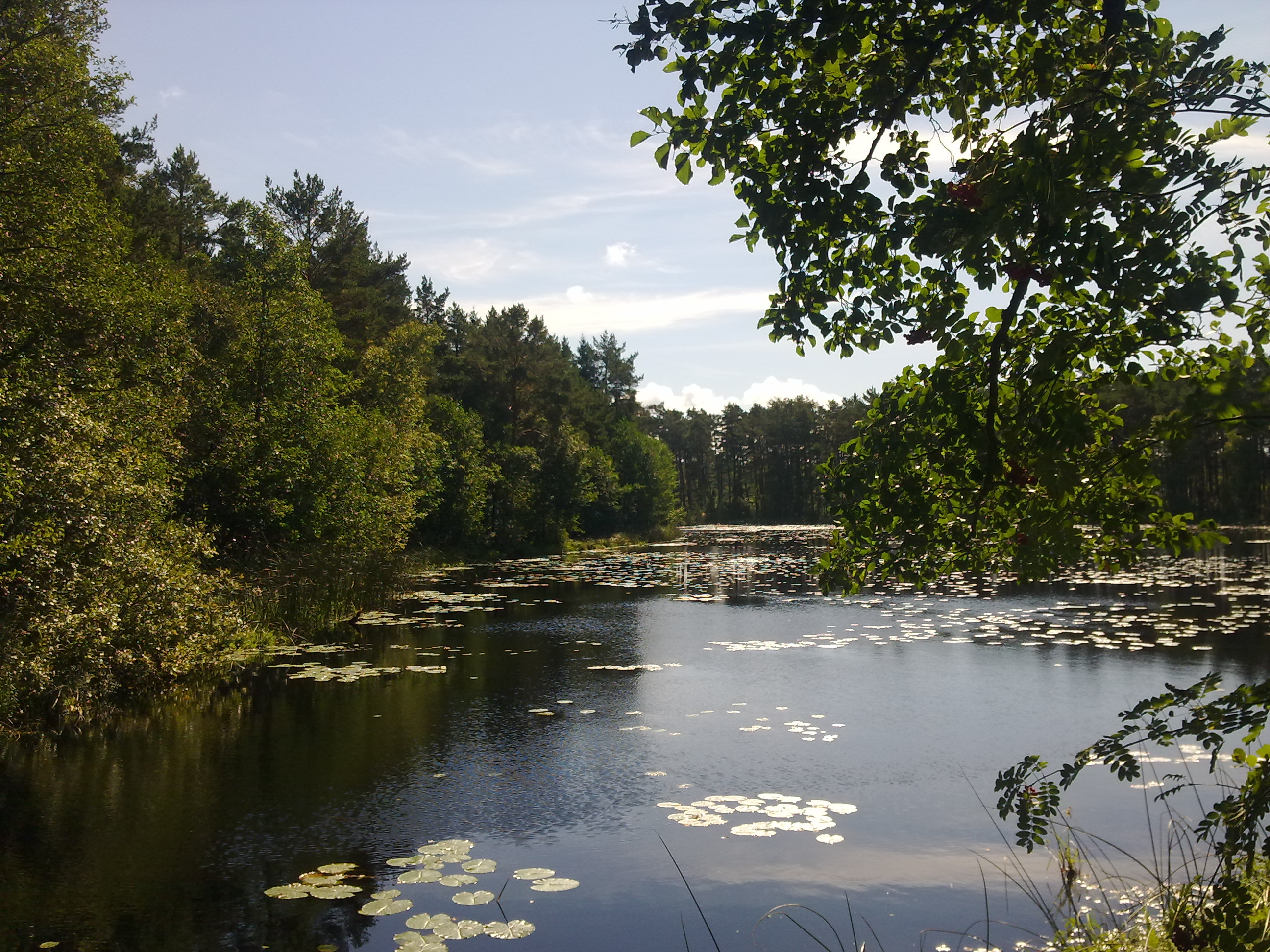
- Allika lake

- Flag Coat of arms

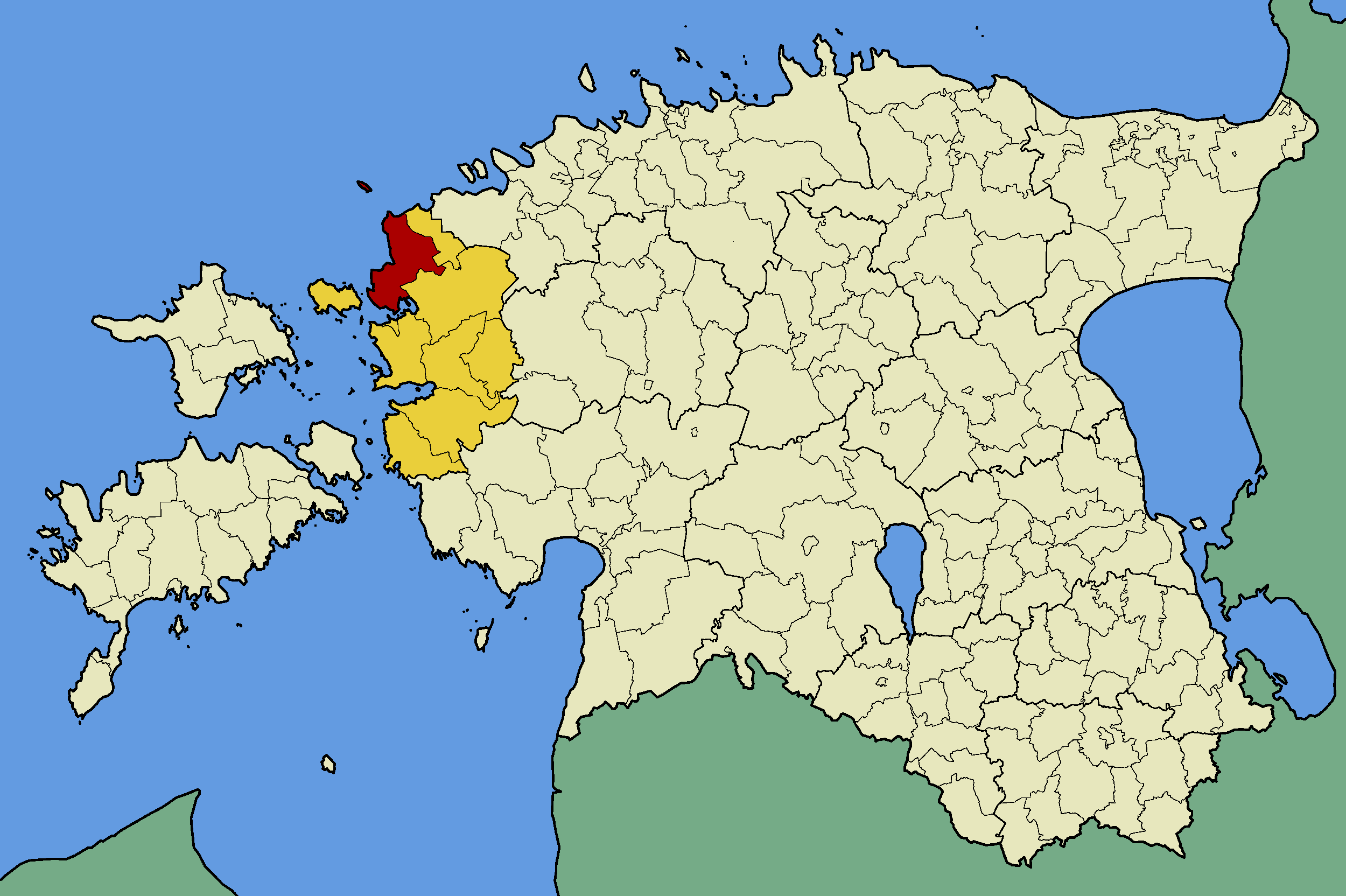
- Noarootsi Parish within Lääne County.
- Country: Estonia
- County: Lääne County
- Administrative centre: Pürksi

Government
  - Mayor: Ülo Kalm

Area
  - Total: 296 km^{2} (114 sq mi)

Population (2005)
  - Total: 910
  - Density: 3.1/km^{2} (8.0/sq mi)
- Website: www.noavv.ee

Noarootsi Parish (Estonian: Noarootsi vald, Swedish: Nuckö kommun) was a rural municipality in Lääne County, western Estonia between 1991 and 2017. It covered an area of 296 km^{2} (114 sq mi) and had a population of 910.

The administrative centre of Noarootsi Parish was Pürksi village (Swedish: Birkas). It is located 10 km north of the capital of Lääne County, Haapsalu.

== Villages ==
There were 23 villages in Noarootsi Parish: Aulepa (Dirslätt), Dirhami (Derhamn), Einbi (Enby), Elbiku (Ölbäck), Hara (Harga), Hosby, Höbringi (Höbring), Kudani (Gutanäs), Osmussaare (Odensholm), Paslepa (Pasklep), Pürksi (Birkas), Riguldi (Rickul), Rooslepa (Roslep), Saare (Lyckholm), Spithami (Spithamn), Sutlepa (Sutlep), Suur-Nõmmküla (Klottorp), Tahu (Skåtanäs), Telise (Tällnäs), Tuksi (Bergsby), Vanaküla (Gambyn), Väike-Nõmmküla (Persåker), Österby.

== History ==
Noarootsi was historically the only parish on the Estonian mainland where most of the local residents were Estonian Swedes. In 1934, the parish had 4,388 inhabitants, 2,697 (64%) of them Estonian Swedes.

Until the end of the ancient historic period, today's Noarootsi area was practically unpopulated. Noarootsi peninsula was once a group of small islands, which joined the mainland in the middle of the 19th century. The first written proof of the Swedish population stems from the 13th century. There has been speculation, although unfounded, that many of the Swedes came from Finland. For historical reasons, the Swedes had privileges (Svensk Rätt—"Swedish rights"), which consisted mainly of personal freedom and freedom of movement, and lower taxes. The Swedish population was strengthened by influx of Swedes from Uusimaa in Finland, peaking in the beginning of the 16th century.

In the second half of the 16th century, during the Livonian war, the areas of Noarootsi were plundered by Russian army troops, and many sites, such as the church, were devastated. Beginning in the 1580s, Noarootsi was subjected to Swedish rule, which lasted until 1710. The Swedish era caused the cultural life to accelerate. In Noarootsi, the first known folk high school (first mentioned in 1650) was established by local Lutheran pastor Isaacus Mariaestadius Hasselblatt. Noarootsi church added chapels in Sutlepa, Rooslepa and Osmussaar. At the same time, a line of manor houses was built, which initiated limits on the coastal Swedes' rights. Noarootsi's peasants' long fight for their freedom had begun.

During the Great Northern War, Noarootsi was attacked by the plague epidemic during 1710–1711. The number of residents decreased by two-thirds, and many villages died out completely. Estonians from the mainland came to live in the empty villages. It was the start of Noarootsi becoming Estonianized. After the Great Northern War, the conflicts between the lords of the manors and the peasants became more critical. This conflict culminated in the 1770s, with the sending of some of Hara's village residents to the mainland.

In 1816 serfdom was abolished in Estonia. It did not touch the coastal Swedish Estonians, as their condition was ambiguous. They were not slaves and yet they were not entirely free. The folks' communal self-government and permanent compulsory school attendance were established in Noarootsi in 1856.

In the middle of the 19th century, a new intellectual period began. Schools needed Swedish-speaking teachers. For their preparation in the Paslepa manor house, a teachers' training college was established, which was in operation for 14 years. The training college was led by the Swedish missionary Thure Emanuel Thorén. By the 1890s, a network of Swedish schools was formed in Estonia.

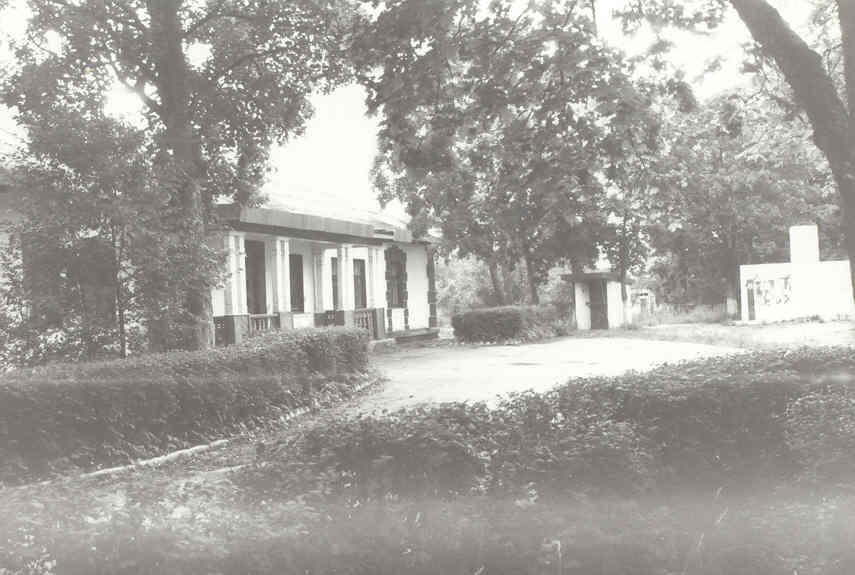
Pasklep manor in August 1993.

In the beginning of the 20th century, Noarootsi started to be the centre of the Swedes' intellectual activity. The local society's activities were led by Johan Nymann and Hans Pöhl. In 1898 the first choral society was established in Paslepa, and in 1902 the first Swedish lending library was established. In 1903 the first Swedish calendar was distributed. In 1909 the Swedish education association was established in the Vööla manor house. In 1920 Pürksi's folk high school was opened and it was in operation until 1943.

During the Estonian Republic, the relationship between local residents and Swedes and Finns increased remarkably. Riguldi became a very active ship construction centre, the ship Hoppet (Swedish: Hope) is one ship that still exists from this era. At first, potatoes and apples were exported to Sweden and Finland. It seemed that the Swedes were developing their place in Estonian society.

In 1939 the Red Army bases were brought to Estonia. During this time, a great deal of the population was evacuated from Osmussaar island. In the summer of 1940, the Soviet Union established their power and with this a border zone. It became impossible for the residents to go on with their previous occupations and they started to think about emigration to Sweden.

From 1943 to 1944 most of the Swedes left Estonia. In their place came war refugees from northeastern Estonia and Ingria. In 1944 the Soviet Army returned and the border zone was restored. The remaining inhabitants' contacts with their relatives in Sweden were cut off. During the forced emigration and building up of kolkhozes (collective farms), many villages were ruined and the coastal areas became military zones. Only a few villages have retained their original look.

The new age in Noarootsi's history started at the end of the 1980s. The border zone disappeared and the local residents could return to their homes. In 1988 the first folk day celebrations were organized in Noarootsi. In 1989 Swedish instruction was reinstated in Noarootsi. In 1990, Noarootsi Gymnasium, with immersion study in Swedish, was founded in Pürksi. Approximately 900 people lived in Noarootsi Parish in 2005, only 50 of them considered themselves Swedish.

Some Swedes have returned to Noarootsi after the demise of Soviet Union and bought or reclaimed old property, usually land, which they developed. The area is attractive for people looking for a summer house as large areas of Noarootsi have been off limits for civilians during Soviet rule. High property tax in Sweden and low in Estonia is another reason.

=== Chronology ===
- 13th century (second half) Noarootsi was founded
- 1250 Osmussaar was first mentioned in written sources
- 1294 Swedish people were first mentioned near Haapsalu
- 1391 Noarootsi was first mentioned in sources as Nuckö
- 1575 Russian looting raid during the Livonian war
- 1581 Noarootsi came under the control of Sweden
- 17th century first manor estates in Noarootsi
- 1650 School of Noarootsi is first mentioned. A pastor of that time, Isaac Mariestadius Hasselblad, founded Pürksi Public Primary School, where reading and writing were taught in Swedish.
- 1710 Noarootsi along with rest of Estonia came under the control of Russia
- 1710-1711 Epidemic plague
- 1856 Local self-government was established
- 1873 Missionary Thure Emanuel Thorén arrived
- 1873-1887 Paslepa Teachers' College, which educated teachers for Swedish schools, in operation in Noarootsi
- 1902 The first Swedish language book was published in Noarootsi
- 1903 The first Swedish language calendar was distributed
- 1909 The Swedish Educational Society was established
- 1920-1943 Pürksi Folk High School, which became the Pürksi Estonian-Swedes' cultural centre, in operation in Pürksi
- 1935 Monument to the War of Independence in Hosby was unveiled
- 1940 Soviet rule established
- 1941 Deportations
- 1943-1944 The majority of Noarootsi's inhabitants left for Sweden
- 1988 First celebrations of the Noarootsi homestead days
- 1989 Second era of teaching Swedish began
- 1990 Noarootsi Gymnasium was opened. War of Independence monument was rededicated
- 1991 After Estonia regained its independence, Noarootsi Parish was established as a municipality
- 1993 Paslepa Folk High School was opened
- 2017 During the administrative reform Noarootsi Parish was merged to Lääne-Nigula Parish

== Gallery ==
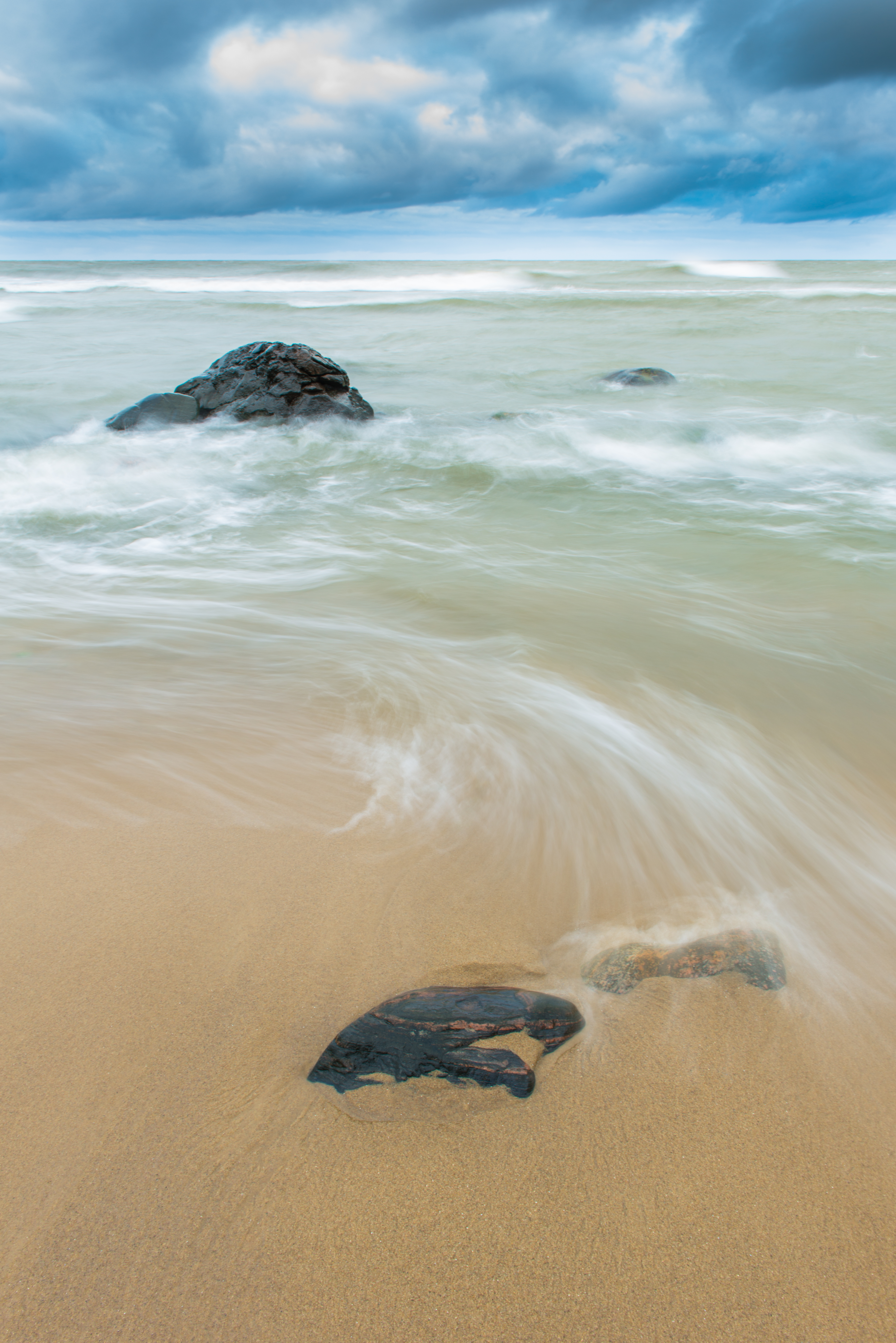
Põõsaspea

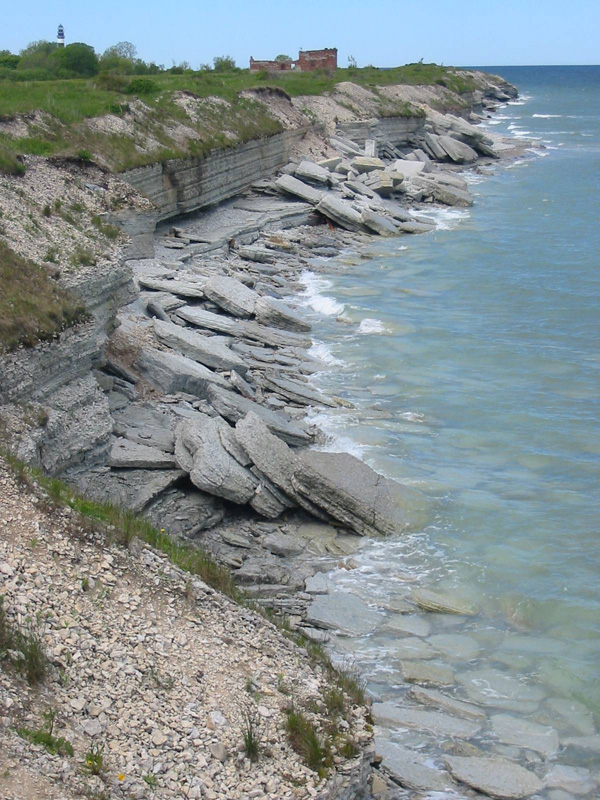
Osmussaar

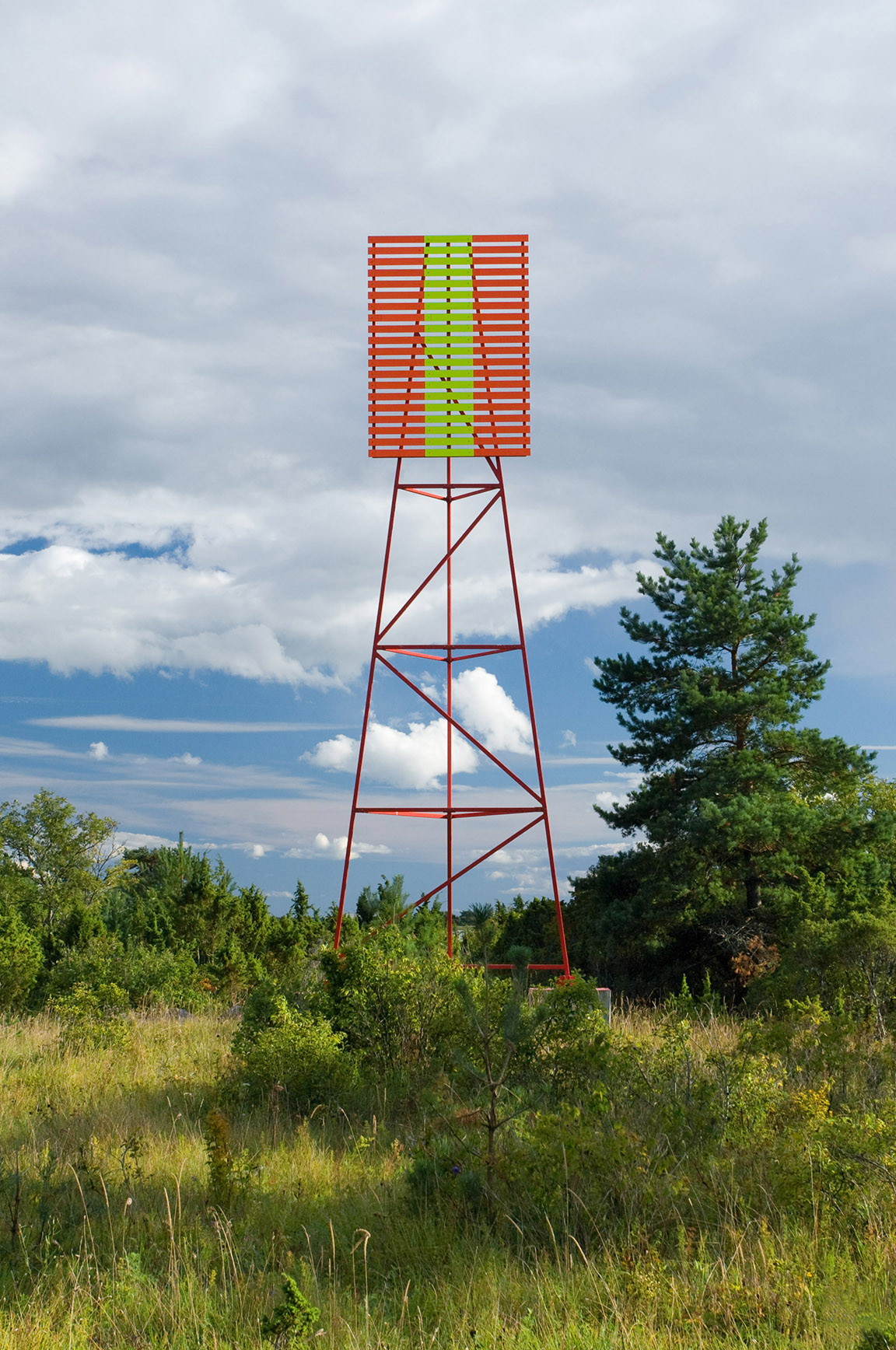
Ramsi

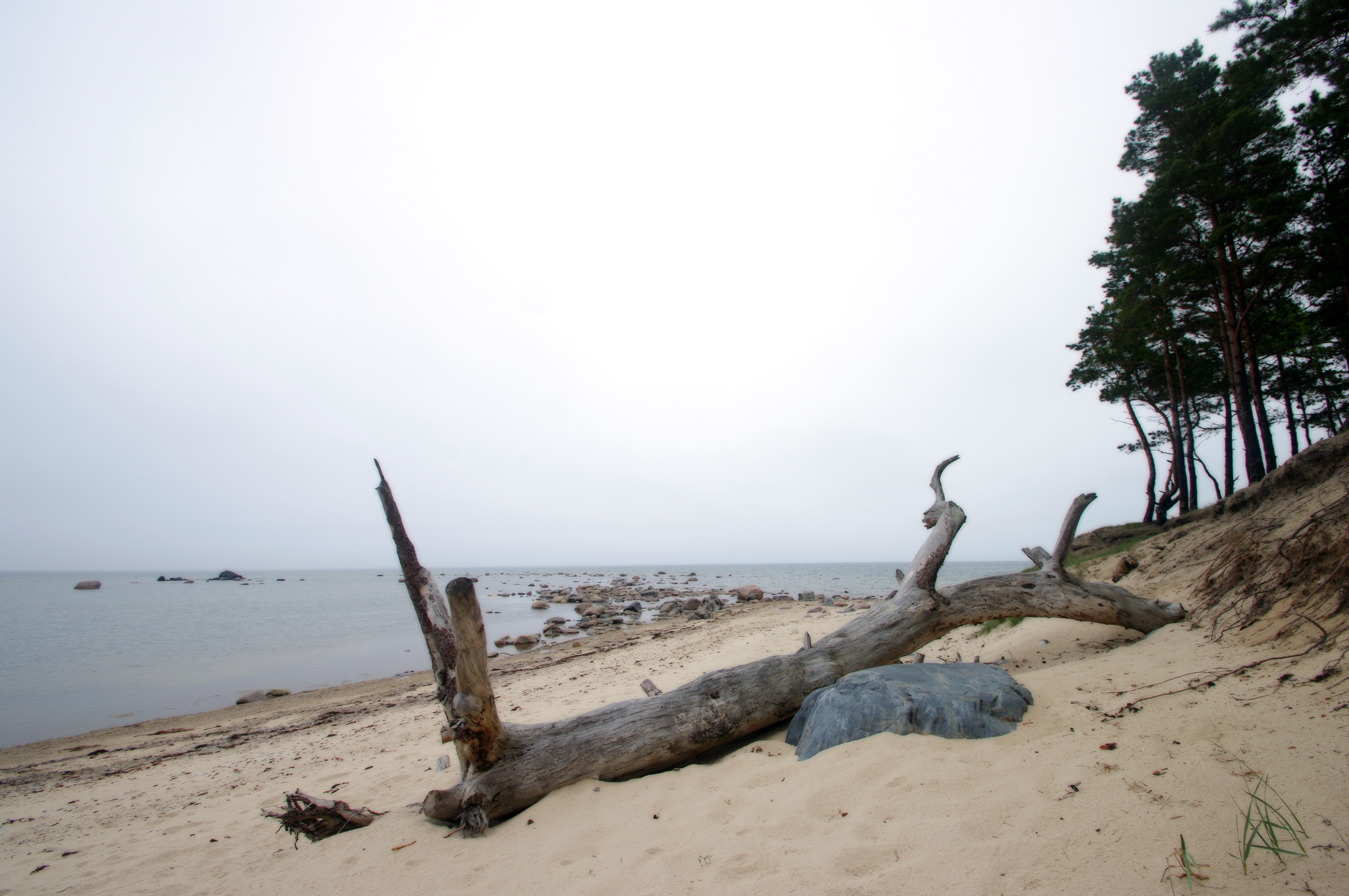
Dirhami

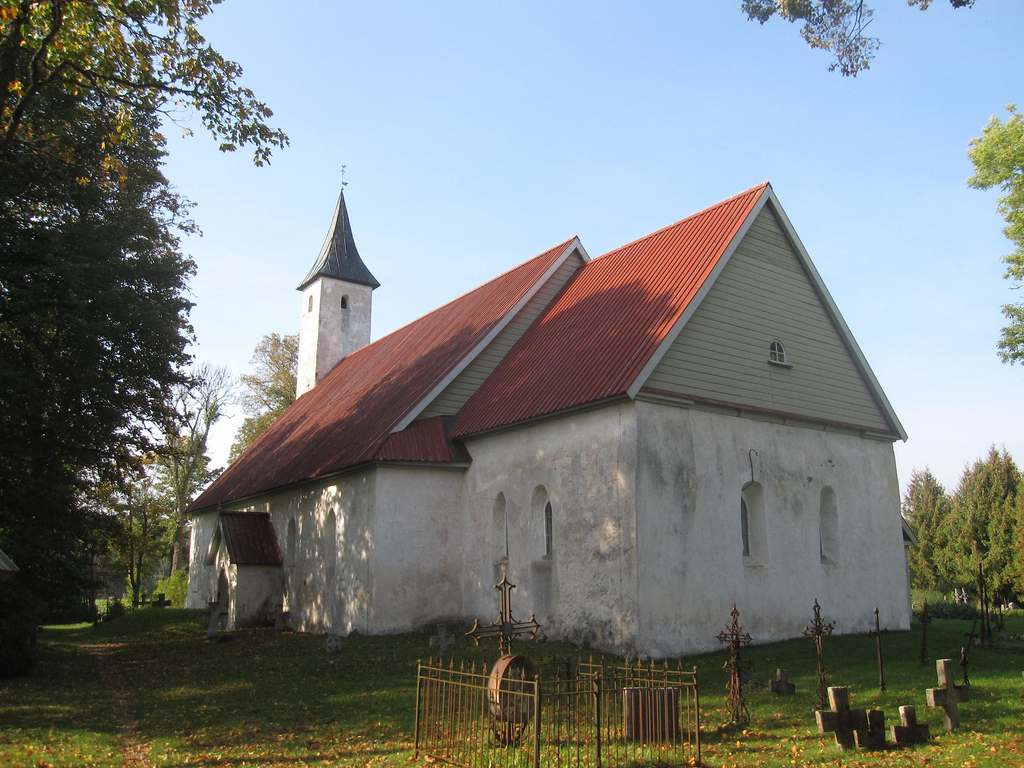
Noarootsi Church

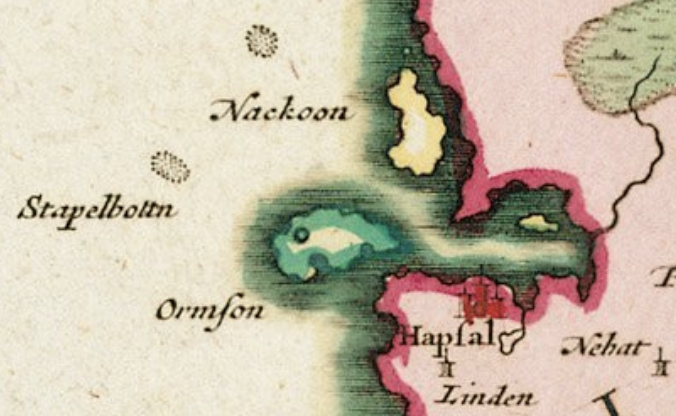
A 1705 map of the area around Noarootsi (here called Nackoon) in Latin and German when it was an island
