= Nõmmküla =

Nõmmküla may refer to several places in Estonia:

- Nõmmküla, Lääne-Viru County
  - Nõmmküla, Tapa Parish, village in Tapa Parish, Lääne-Viru County
  - Nõmmküla, Väike-Maarja Parish, village in Väike-Maarja Parish, Lääne-Viru County
- Nõmmküla, Rapla County, village in Rapla Parish, Rapla County
- Nõmmküla, Saare County, village in Muhu Parish, Saare County

== See also ==
- Suur-Nõmmküla, village in Lääne-Nigula Parish, Lääne County
- Väike-Nõmmküla, village in Lääne-Nigula Parish, Lääne County
