= Vanaküla (Gambyn) =

Village in Estonia

Coordinates: 59°06′53″N 23°35′11″E

- Village
- Interactive map of Vanaküla
- Country: Estonia
- County: Lääne County
- Parish: Lääne-Nigula Parish
- Time zone: UTC+2 (EET)
  - Summer (DST): UTC+3 (EEST)

Vanaküla (Swedish: Gambyn) is a village in Lääne-Nigula Parish, Lääne County, in western Estonia.

== Name ==
Vanaküla was attested in written sources as Gammelby in 1642 and Gam̄alby in 1798. Both the old Swedish names and the Estonian name literally mean 'old village'. According to the Swedish linguist Edvin Lagman, the nearby village of Riguldi probably consisted of multiple hamlets, including one called Gambyn (i.e., 'the old part of the village'). In 1604, when the territory of Rugildi was assigned to newly built Riguldi Manor, the village and the peasants were dispersed, including the hamlet of Gambyn (which had been located in a field called Bystället). However, the peasants were able to take the name of their village with them, and, when they found a new place to settle on the edge of the forest, they reused the name. The fact that today's Swedish name, Gambyn, occurs in the definite form (suffixed with -n) suggests that it is more recent than other nearby Swedish settlement names ending in -by 'village', such as Enby, Hosby, and Österby.
