= Möldri Sea =

Lake in Estonia

- Möldri meri (Estonian); Menarsvae (Swedish)
- Location within Estonia
- Coordinates: 59.0754817°N 23.5597543°E
- Basin countries: Estonia
- Max. length: 410 meters (1,350 ft)
- Surface area: 4.6 hectares (11 acres)
- Max. depth: 0.8 meters (2 ft 7 in)
- Shore length^{1}: 1,370 meters (4,490 ft)
- Surface elevation: 1.0 meter (3 ft 3 in)
- ^{1} Shore length is not a well-defined measure.

The Möldri Sea (Estonian: Möldri meri, also Möldri järv, Mellansjöu, or Möldrimeri; Swedish: Menarsvae) is a lake in Estonia. It is located in the village of Hara in Lääne-Nigula Parish, Lääne County.

== Physical description ==
The lake has an area of 4.6 hectares (11 acres). The lake has a maximum depth of 0.8 meters (2 ft 7 in). It is 410 meters (1,350 ft) long, and its shoreline measures 1,370 meters (4,490 ft).

== Name ==
The lake is one of several in the area that are fed by saltwater and therefore brackish, hence the Estonian name Möldri meri 'Möldri Sea' alongside the variant name Möldri järv 'Lake Möldri'. Together with the other brackish lakes, such as the neighboring Karjatse Sea and Vööla Sea, it is a relic of the eastern branch of the Silmen Strait, which formerly separated Noarootsi Island (now the Noarootsi Peninsula) from the mainland. The lake shares its name with the hamlet of Möldri north of the lake in the neighboring village of Aulepa, derived from the common noun mölder (genitive: möldri) 'miller'.

== See also ==
- List of lakes of Estonia
