= Rummo =

Family name

Rummo is an Estonian surname. Notable bearers include:

- Paul-Eerik Rummo (born 1942), poet and politician
- Jüri Rummo (1856–?; better known as Rummu Jüri), outlaw and folk hero
- Vello Rummo (1921–2009), theatre director and pedagogue

== See also ==
- Rummu (disambiguation)
- Rummo (company), Italian food company
