= Hosby =

Hosby may refer to several places:

== Denmark ==
- Hosby, Denmark, village in Hedensted Municipality, Central Denmark Region

== Estonia ==
- Hosby, Lääne-Nigula Parish, village in Lääne-Nigula Parish, Lääne County
- Hosby, Vormsi Parish, village in Vormsi Parish, Lääne County
