= Haavakannu =

Village in Estonia

Coordinates: 59°28′N 25°17′E

- Village
- Interactive map of Haavakannu
- Country: Estonia
- County: Harju County
- Parish: Kuusalu Parish
- Time zone: UTC+2 (EET)
  - Summer (DST): UTC+3 (EEST)

Haavakannu is a village in Kuusalu Parish, Harju County in northern Estonia.

== Name ==
Haavakannu was attested in written sources as Havakand in 1517, Hawa Kant in 1694, and Hawakand in 1769 (referring to the original single large farm there). The name Haavakannu means 'aspen stump', from haava (genitive of haab 'aspen') + kannu (i.e., kännu, genitive of känd 'stump'). The name Haavakannu was also attested in the territory of neighboring Rummu Manor as Haffwa Kant in 1693, referring to today's Haavamäe farm in the village of Saunja.

== Notable people ==
Notable people that were born or lived in Haavakannu include the following:

- Gustav Vilbaste (1885–1967), ethnobotanist, born in Haavakannu
