= Ervin-Ernst-Friedrich Thomson =

Estonian politician

Ervin-Ernst-Friedrich Thomson (23 July 1867 – 17 June 1932 Tallinn) was an Estonian politician. He was a member of IV Riigikogu. He was a member of the Riigikogu since 22 January 1930. He replaced Hans Pöhl. On 27 January 1930, he resigned his position and he was replaced by Erich Friedrich Carl Walter.
