= Karjatse Sea =

Lake in Estonia

- Karjatse meri (Estonian); Bäckesjoen (Swedish)
- Location within Estonia
- Coordinates: 59°04′N 23°34′E
- Basin countries: Estonia
- Max. length: 1,080 meters (3,540 ft)
- Surface area: 33.2 hectares (82 acres)
- Average depth: 1.0 meter (3 ft 3 in)
- Shore length^{1}: 4,160 meters (13,650 ft)
- Surface elevation: 1.0 meter (3 ft 3 in)
- ^{1} Shore length is not a well-defined measure.

The Karjatse Sea (Estonian: Karjatse meri, also Karjatse järv, Karjatsimeri, or Karjatsi meri; Swedish: Bäckesjoen) is a lake in Estonia. It is located in the village of Hara in Lääne-Nigula Parish, Lääne County.

== Physical description ==
The lake has an area of 33.2 hectares (82 acres). The lake has a maximum depth of 1.0 meter (3 ft 3 in). It is 1,080 meters (3,540 ft) long, and its shoreline measures 4,160 meters (13,650 ft).

== Name ==
The lake is one of several in the area that are fed by saltwater and therefore brackish, hence the Estonian name Karjatse meri 'Karjatse Sea' alongside the variant name Karjatse järv 'Lake Karjatse'. Together with the other brackish lakes, such as the neighboring Möldri Sea and Vööla Sea, it is a relic of the eastern branch of the Silmen Strait, which formerly separated Noarootsi Island (now the Noarootsi Peninsula) from the mainland. The Swedish name Bäckesjoen literally means 'brook sea' or 'stream sea'.

== See also ==
- List of lakes of Estonia
