= Maarja Nummert =

Estonian architect (1944–2024)

- Born: 24 April 1944; Estonia
- Died: 22 July 2024 (aged 80); Estonia
- Occupation: Architect
- Known for: School architecture; use of wood in educational buildings
- Awards: 1987 – Laureate and silver medal at the International Architecture Biennale "Interarch 87"; 1988 – State Prize of the Estonian SSR

Maarja Nummert (24 April 1944 – 22 July 2024) was an Estonian architect who designed a number of school buildings.

== Life and career ==
Nummert was born on 24 April 1944. She received several awards for her work, sometimes using wood for village schools such as the one in Hageri where some of the rooms are circular providing a more attractive environment for the children. She also designed the Salem Baptist Church in Tartu which is known for its fine acoustics. Nummert died on 22 July 2024, at the age of 80.

== Works ==
=== Schools and Kindergartens ===
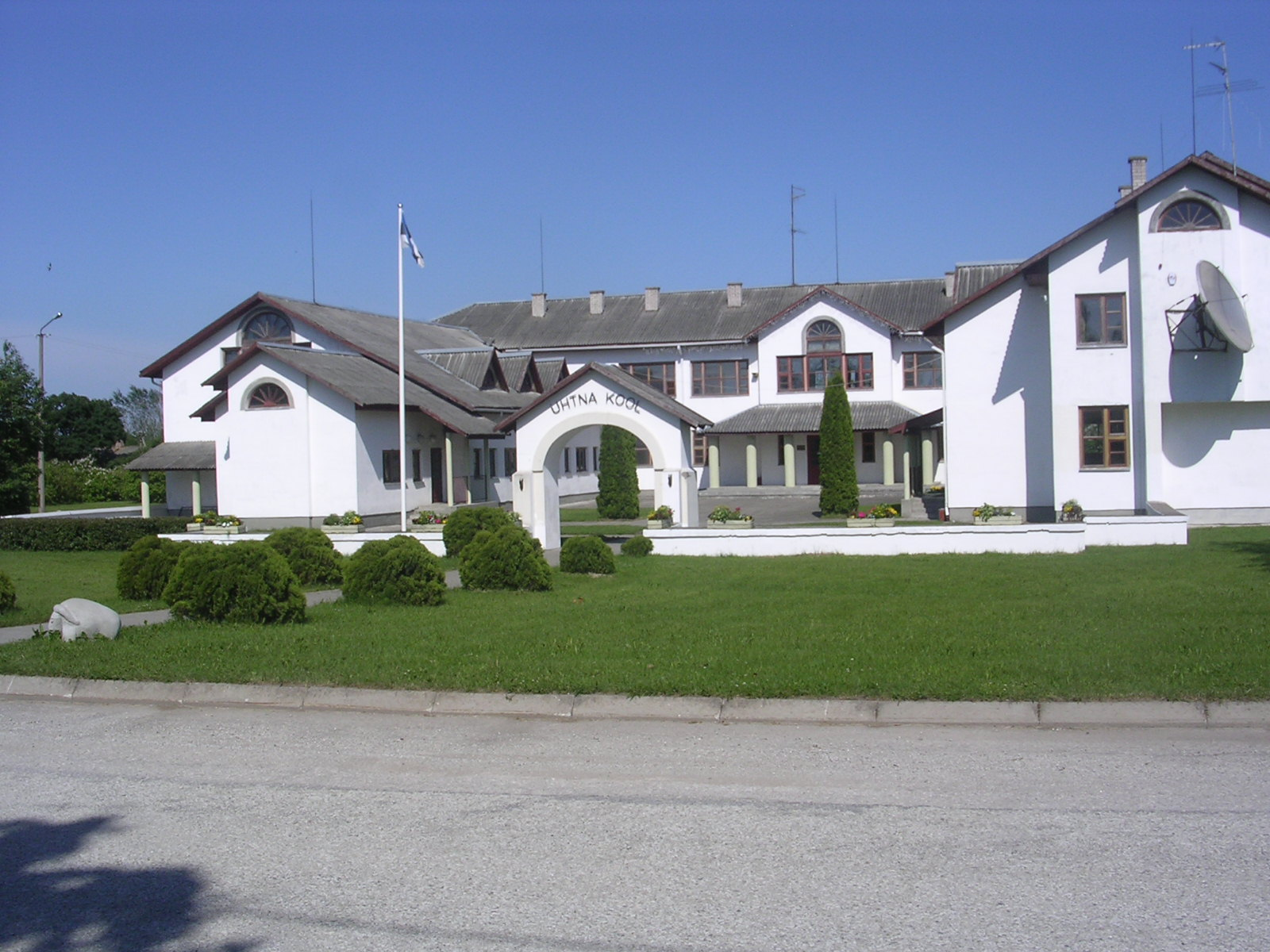
School in Uhtna

- Uhtna Basic School (1986)
- Kolga School (same design also used for Noarootsi School, Püünsi School, Alavere Kindergarten-Basic School, Oru Basic School, Leie Basic School, 1986–1995)
- Ääsmäe School (also Palivere Basic School, 1988–1992)
- Keeni Basic School (also Valgjärve School, Orava School, 1988–1992)
- Extension to Merivälja School (1994)
- Tahkuranna Kindergarten-Primary School (1995)
- Käru Basic School (2000)
- Renovation and extension of Kääpa Basic School (2000)
- Urvaste School student dormitory (2000)
- Kohila Gymnasium Hageri school building (2002)
- Renovation of the historic school building of Tallinn School of Service and new wing (2005–2011)
- Nissi Basic School (2008)
- Rõuge Kindergarten (2009)
- Renovation and extension of Aruküla Basic School (2010)
- Kirsiaed Kindergarten of Ruila School (2015)
- Jõhvi Gymnasium (2015)

=== Other Buildings ===
- Lammasmäe Holiday Centre (1969)
- Tartu Salem Church (1991)
- Headquarters of AS EMV (1995)
- Karula National Park Guesthouse (1997)
- Kohila Municipal Building (2005)
- Apartment buildings on Karu, Vilmsi, and Masti Streets (1989, 2004, 2006)
- AS Arco Color office and production building (2017)
- Österby Harbour Building (2020)
- Rõuge Depot (2022)
- Noarootsi Open-Air Stage (2022)

== Awards ==
- 1986 – Architecture Prize of the newspaper Sirp ja Vasar
- 1986 – Medal and diploma of the Union of Architects of the USSR
- 1987 – Laureate and silver medal at the International Architecture Biennale "Interarch 87"
- 1988 – State Prize of the Estonian SSR
- 1989 – Alar Kotli Architecture Award
