= Rummu (disambiguation) =

Rummu may refer to several places in Estonia:

- Rummu, small borough in Vasalemma Parish, Harju County
- Rummu, Kuusalu Parish, village in Kuusalu Parish, Harju County
- Rummu, Lääne County, village in Ridala Parish, Lääne County

== See also ==
- Rummu Jüri (1856–1???; Jüri Rummo), Estonian outlaw, folk hero
- Rummo (disambiguation)
