= Vööla Sea =

Lake in Estonia

- Vööla meri (Estonian)
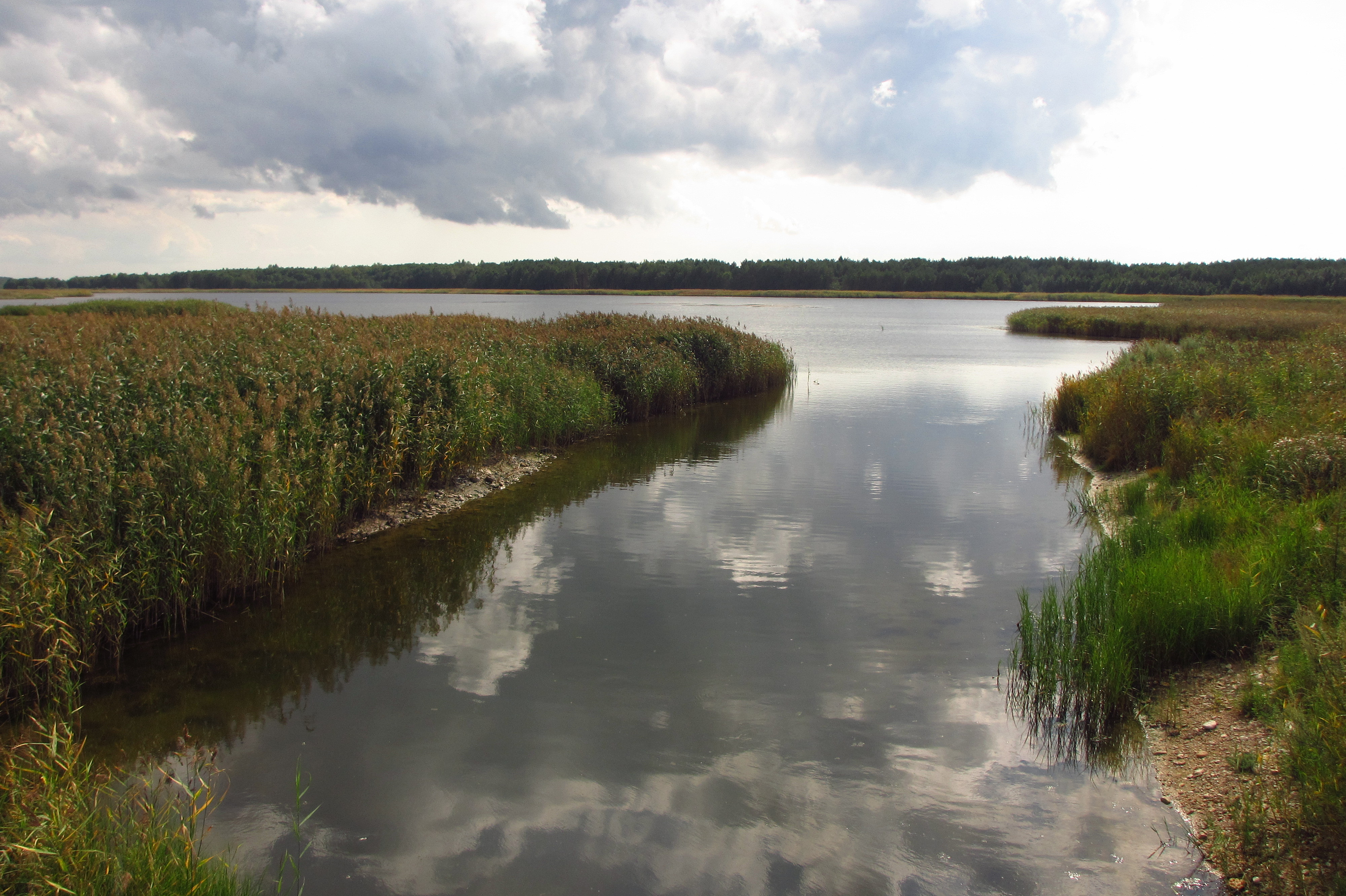

- Location within Estonia
- Coordinates: 59°04′23″N 23°31′16″E
- Basin countries: Estonia
- Max. length: 2,580 meters (8,460 ft)
- Surface area: 68.5 hectares (169 acres)
- Shore length^{1}: 8,220 meters (26,970 ft)
- ^{1} Shore length is not a well-defined measure.

The Vööla Sea (Estonian: Vööla meri, also known as Vööle meri or Võõla meri, Swedish: Bysholmsvike) is a lake in Estonia. It is located in the village of Kudani in Lääne-Nigula Parish, Lääne County.

== Physical description ==
The lake has an area of 68.5 hectares (169 acres). It is 2,580 meters (8,460 ft) long, and its shoreline measures 8,220 meters (26,970 ft).

== Name ==
The lake is one of several in the area that are fed by saltwater and therefore brackish, hence the Estonian name Vööla meri 'Vööla Sea'. Together with the other brackish lakes, such as the neighboring Karjatse Sea and Möldri Sea, it is a relic of the eastern branch of the Silmen Strait, which formerly separated Noarootsi Island (now the Noarootsi Peninsula) from the mainland. The lake shares its name with the hamlet of Vööla east of the lake in the neighboring village of Hara; the name Vööla is of unknown origin.

== See also ==
- List of lakes of Estonia
