= Höbringi =

Village in Estonia

Höbringi Swedish: Höbring
- Village
- Location within Estonia
- Coordinates: 59°08′N 23°35′E
- Country: Estonia
- County: Lääne County
- Parish: Lääne-Nigula Parish
- Time zone: UTC+2 (EET)
  - Summer (DST): UTC+3 (EEST)

Höbringi (Swedish: Höbring) is a village in Lääne-Nigula Parish, Lääne County, in western Estonia. Before the administrative reform in 2017, the village was in Noarootsi Parish.
