= Vello Rummo =

Estonian theatre director (1921–2009)

- Born: 15 May 1921; Nõmmküla, Rapla County, Estonia
- Died: 24 November 2009 (aged 88); Pärnu, Estonia
- Education: Lunacharsky State Institute for Theatre Arts
- Occupations: Theatre director; pedagogue
- Years active: 1945–1995
- Spouse: Linda Kald
- Awards: Estonian SSR Merited Art Personnel (1975)
- Military career
- Allegiance: Soviet Union
- Branch: Red Army
- Unit: 8th Estonian Rifle Corps
- Conflicts: World War II

Vello Rummo (15 May 1921 – 24 November 2009) was an Estonian theatre director and pedagogue.

== Early life and education ==
Rummo was born on 15 May 1921 in Raikküla Parish, Nõmmküla.

During World War II, he was mobilized into the Red Army and served with the 8th Estonian Rifle Corps. In 1953, he graduated from Lunacharsky State Institute for Theatre Arts' (GITIS) Estonian studio.

== Career ==
From 1945 until 1949, he worked at Estonian Radio. From 1955 until 1961, he was the chief director and artistic manager of Eesti Televisioon.

In 1957, he was one of the founders of the Tallinn State Conservatory's Department of Performing Arts and, for more than 10 years, a lecturer at the institution.

From 1969 until 1982, he was the chief stage manager at Endla Theatre in Pärnu and from 1982 until 1995, was the theatre's general director.

== Personal life and death ==
Rummo was married to stage, film, and television actress Linda Rummo (née Kald).

He died on 24 November 2009 in Pärnu.

== Awards ==
- 1975: Estonian SSR merited art personnel

== Productions of plays ==
- Rozov's "Õnn kaasa!" (1955)
- Bernstein's "West Side’i lugu" (1964, diploma work at Estonia Theatre)
- Blažek's and Rychman's "Humalakorjajad" (1967, diploma work at Estonian Youth Theatre)
