= Wilhelm von Wrangell =

Estonian politician (1894–1976)

Wilhelm von Wrangell (9 August 1894, Võru – 26 December 1976, Lilienthal, West Germany) was an Estonian politician. He was a member of IV Riigikogu. He was a member of the Riigikogu since 29 January 1930. He replaced Erich Friedrich Valter. On 31 January 1930, he resigned his position and he was replaced by Mathias Westerblom.
