= Gustav Vilbaste =

Estonian botanist

Gustav Vilbaste (until 1935 Gustav Vilberg; 3 September 1885 in Haavakannu, Kodasoo Parish – 21 February 1967 in Tallinn) was an Estonian botanist, publicist and conservationist.

He wrote the first Estonian-language keybooks on Estonian flora.

He was an honorary member of the Estonian Naturalists' Society.
