= Elbiku =

Village in Estonia

Coordinates: 59°10′N 23°32′E

- Village
- Interactive map of Elbiku
- Country: Estonia
- County: Lääne County
- Parish: Lääne-Nigula Parish
- Time zone: UTC+2 (EET)
  - Summer (DST): UTC+3 (EEST)

Elbiku (Swedish: Ölbäck) is a village in Lääne-Nigula Parish, Lääne County, in western Estonia.

Before the administrative reform in 2017, the village was in Noarootsi Parish.

== Main sights ==
The main tourist attraction in Elbiku is Roosta Puhkeküla, a seaside recreation center. The center offers houses for rent, dining and physical activities such as bowling, disc golf and climbing in an adventure park.

Elbiku, being a coastal village, is also home to a sandy beach. The Elbiku beach is one of the most visited beaches of the Lääne-Nigula Parish, mostly due to the connection to Roosta Puhkeküla. The beach has several changing rooms, a small café and water vehicles available to rent.

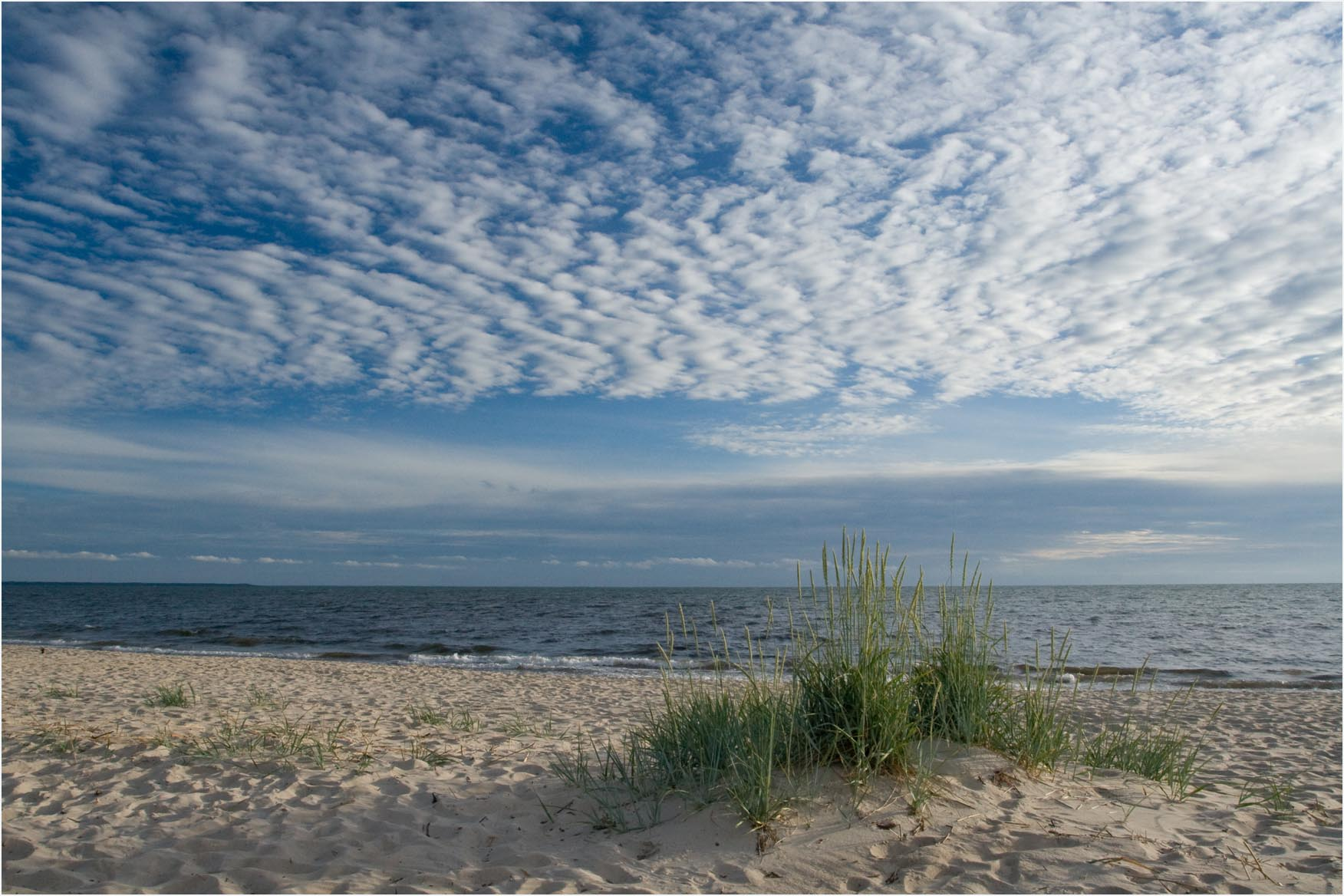
A panorama view of Elbiku beach
