= Mathias Westerblom =

Estonian politician

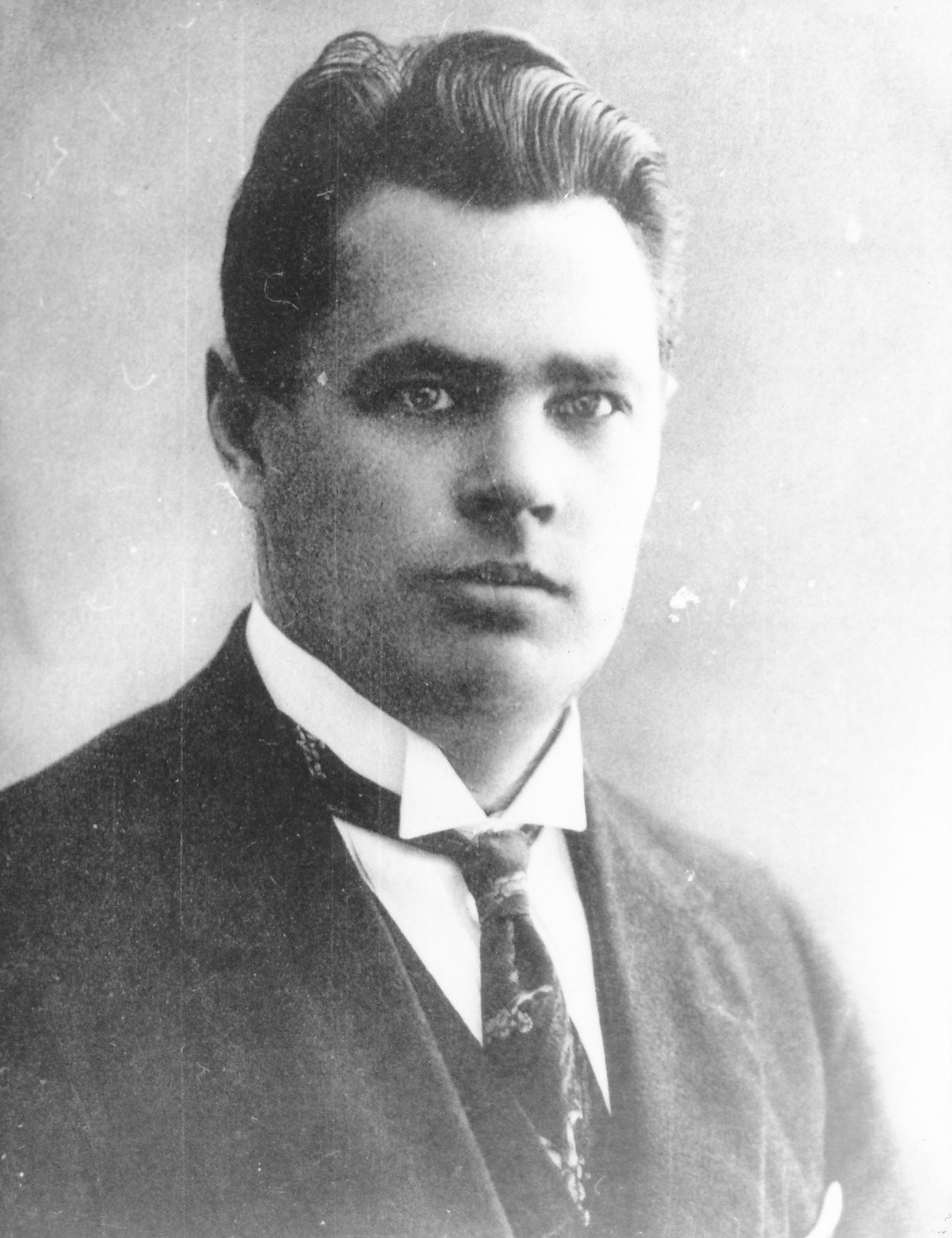
Mathias Westerblom

Mathias Westerblom (also Mathias Vesterblom; 15 September 1888 Noarootsi Parish (now Lääne-Nigula Parish), Wiek County – 5 February 1942 Ussolye prison camp, Perm Oblast) was an Estonian politician. He was a member of IV Riigikogu. He was a member of the Riigikogu since 31 January 1930. He replaced Wilhelm von Wrangell.
