= Hans Pöhl =

Estonian politician (1876–1930)

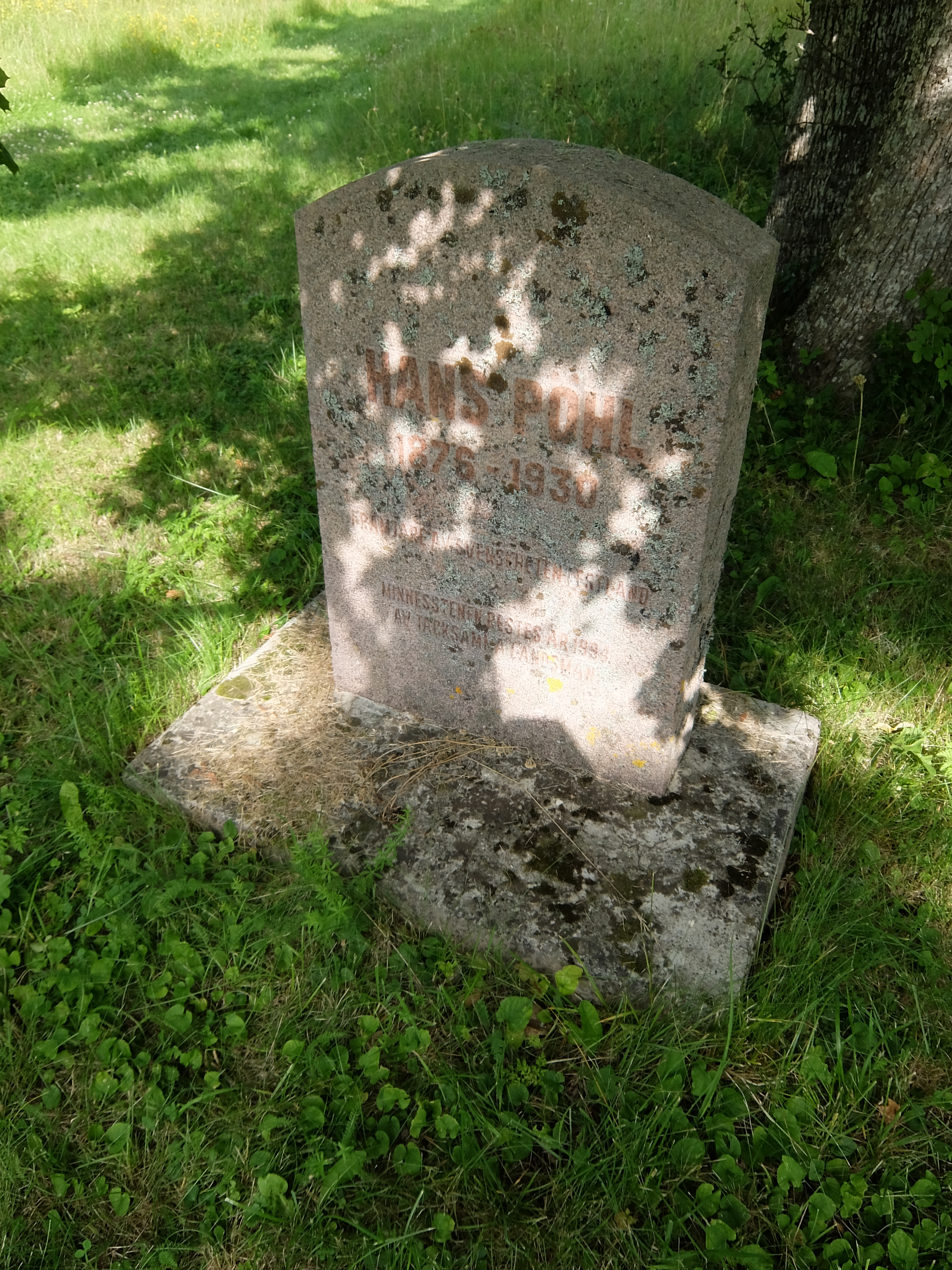
Hans Pöhl's grave in Hullo, on the island of Vormsi

Hans Pöhl (15 August 1876, Suur-Nõmmküla – 22 January 1930 Tallinn) was an Estonian politician. He was one of the leader of Estonian Swedes.

He was a member of the I, III and IV Riigikogu. From 1918 until 1919, he was Minister of Swedish-minority Affairs.
