= Erich Friedrich Carl Walter =

Estonian clergyman and politician

Erich Friedrich Carl Walter (surname also Valter; 12 August 1894 – 8 July 1981) was an Estonian clergyman and politician. He was a member of IV Riigikogu. He was a member of the Riigikogu since 27 January 1930. He replaced Ervin Thomson. On 29 January 1930, he resigned his position and he was replaced by Wilhelm von Wrangell.

Walter was born in Saint Petersburg, then the capital of the Russian Empire, in 1894. He died in Eichwalde, East Germany in 1981.
