= Dirhami =

Village in Estonia

Coordinates: 59°12′N 23°30′E

- Village
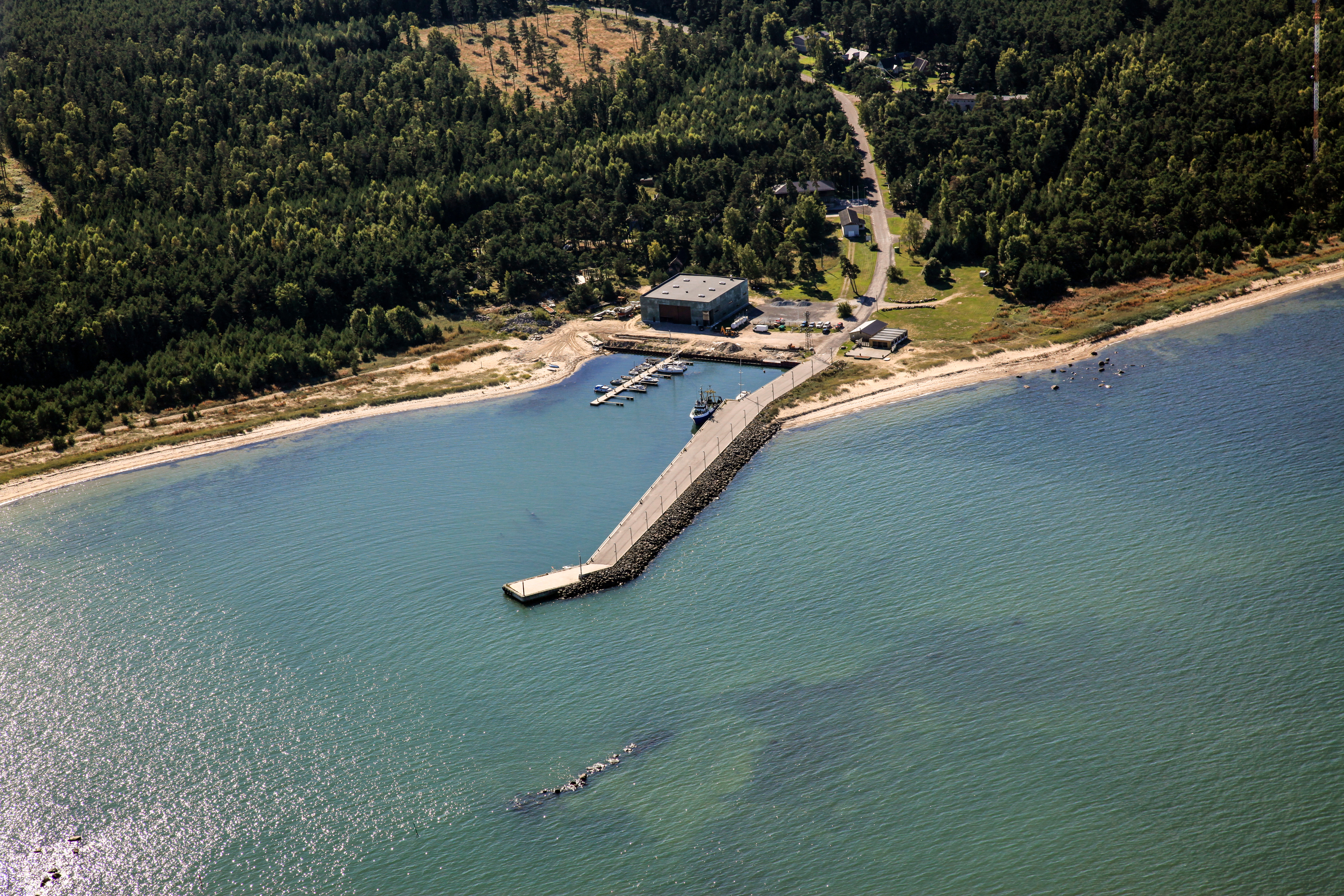
- Dirhami harbour
- Interactive map of Dirhami
- Country: Estonia
- County: Lääne County
- Parish: Lääne-Nigula Parish

Population (2021)
  - Total: 15
- Time zone: UTC+2 (EET)
  - Summer (DST): UTC+3 (EEST)

Dirhami (Swedish: Derhamn) is a village in Lääne-Nigula Parish, Lääne County, in western Estonia. Before the administrative reform in 2017, the village was in Noarootsi Parish. Until World War II, it was mainly inhabited by Estonian Swedes.

Dirhami has a cargo and passenger port, a post office and the hydrology station of the Estonian Institute of Meteorology and Hydrology. There is also a bus stop located inside the village. Some remains of a stronghold built during Peter the Great's rule are still visible in the woods near the village.
