= Einbi =

Village in Estonia

- Village
- Location within Estonia
- Coordinates: 58°59′N 23°27′E
- Country: Estonia
- County: Lääne
- Parish: Lääne-Nigula
- Time zone: UTC+2 (EET)
  - Summer (DST): UTC+3 (EEST)

Einbi (Swedish: Enby) is a village in Lääne-Nigula Parish, Lääne County. It is the westernmost settlement in mainland Estonia.

== History ==
Einbi is believed to be the oldest village in Noarootsi. The earliest written mention of the village is from 1457 in the form of Enbue, though local tradition places its origin in the Viking period. Archaeological evidence places the founding of the village in the 10th century AD, when it was settled by Estonian Swedes. The early Swedish settlers lived by fishing, hunting seals, and raising cattle. Because the land surrounding Einbi is sandy and rocky, early settlers depended largely on the sea for their livelihood. In the 19th century, a coin was found in Einbi that was minted in the reign of Ethelred II (976-1016).

Einbi had between 210 and 399 residents during the period 1839-1924. This made it one of the larger villages in Estonia.

During the 1880s, Estonians began to move into Einbi. In the beginning of Estonian settlement in Einbi, relations between Estonians and Swedes were tense, though not hostile. This was partially due to the language barrier, as the Estonians did not speak Swedish. As intermarriage between Estonians and Swedes increased over the first half of the 20th century, tensions dissipated. However, Swedes in Einbi still hold on to their Swedish identity.

Before the administrative reform in 2017, the village was in Noarootsi Parish.
