= Sutlepa =

Village in Estonia

Coordinates: 59°03′N 23°36′E

- Village
- Interactive map of Sutlepa
- Country: Estonia
- County: Lääne County
- Parish: Lääne-Nigula Parish
- Time zone: UTC+2 (EET)
  - Summer (DST): UTC+3 (EEST)

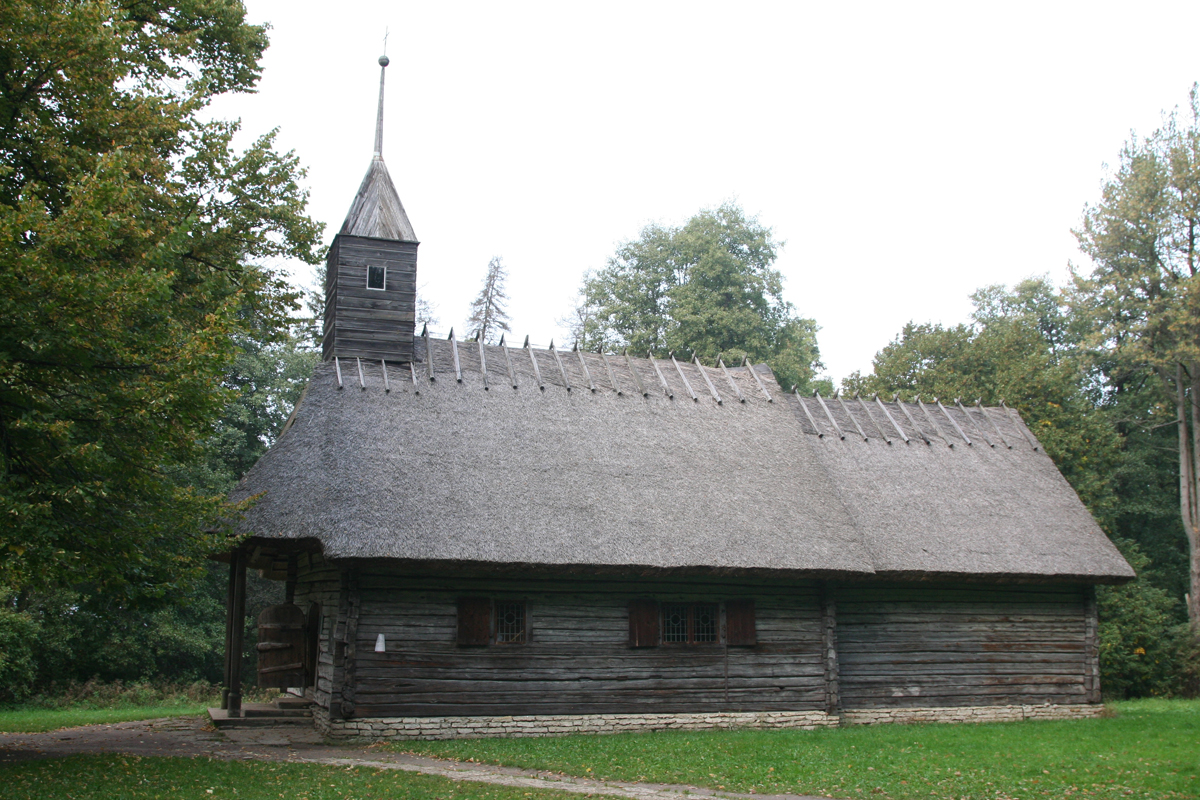
Sutlepa chapel on its new location in Estonian Open Air Museum.

Sutlepa (Swedish: Sutlep, Estonian Swedish: Sutlop) is a village in Lääne-Nigula Parish, Lääne Count, in western Estonia.

In 1507, the village was referred to as Sutloppe, Szutloppe, and in 1540, Sutelep. The name is Estonian in origin, and means either "Wolves' End" or "Wolves' Alder", derived from the words "sute" (wolves) and either "lõpp" (end) or "lepp" (alder).

Wooden Sutlepa chapel from the 17th century was moved to Estonian Open Air Museum in Tallinn in 1970.

== Sutlepa Meri ==
Encompassed in the bounds of the village to the southwest is a former sea turned reedbed named "Sutlepa Meri". It has a nature trail with two observation towers, and is a spot used by birdwatchers.

"Meri" means "Sea" in Estonian.
