= Paslepa =

Village in Estonia

Coordinates: 59°01′N 23°29′E

- Village
- Interactive map of Paslepa
- Country: Estonia
- County: Lääne County
- Parish: Lääne-Nigula Parish
- Time zone: UTC+2 (EET)
  - Summer (DST): UTC+3 (EEST)

Paslepa is a village in Lääne-Nigula Parish, Lääne County, Western Estonia.
