= Pürksi =

Village in Estonia

Coordinates: 59°01′N 23°32′E

- Village
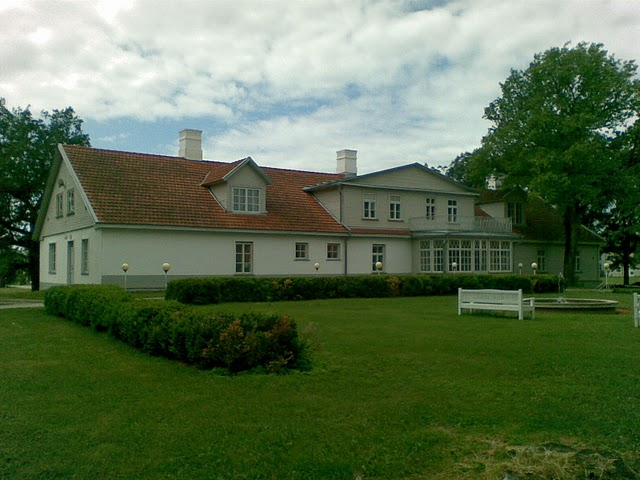
- Pürksi manor
- Interactive map of Pürksi
- Country: Estonia
- County: Lääne County
- Parish: Lääne-Nigula Parish
- Time zone: UTC+2 (EET)
  - Summer (DST): UTC+3 (EEST)

Pürksi (Swedish: Birkas) is a village in Lääne-Nigula Parish, Lääne County, in western Estonia.

== Pürksi manor ==
Pürksi estate was founded in 1620. The building is from 1852. It was the home of artist Johann Carl Emanuel von Ungern-Sternberg (1773-1830), some of whose works are currently at the Art Museum of Estonia, Tallinn. The manor, which lies in a part of Estonia that formerly had a sizeable Swedish minority, is today occupied by a school that is specialised in teaching Swedish.

== See also ==
- Estonian Swedes
