= Rummo (company) =

Italian food company

Rummo SpA
- Industry: Food
- Founded: 1846; 180 years ago
- Headquarters: Benevento, Italy
- Area served: Worldwide
- Products: Pasta; Pasta sauce; Pesto
- Number of employees: >160
- Website: www.pastarummo.it/en

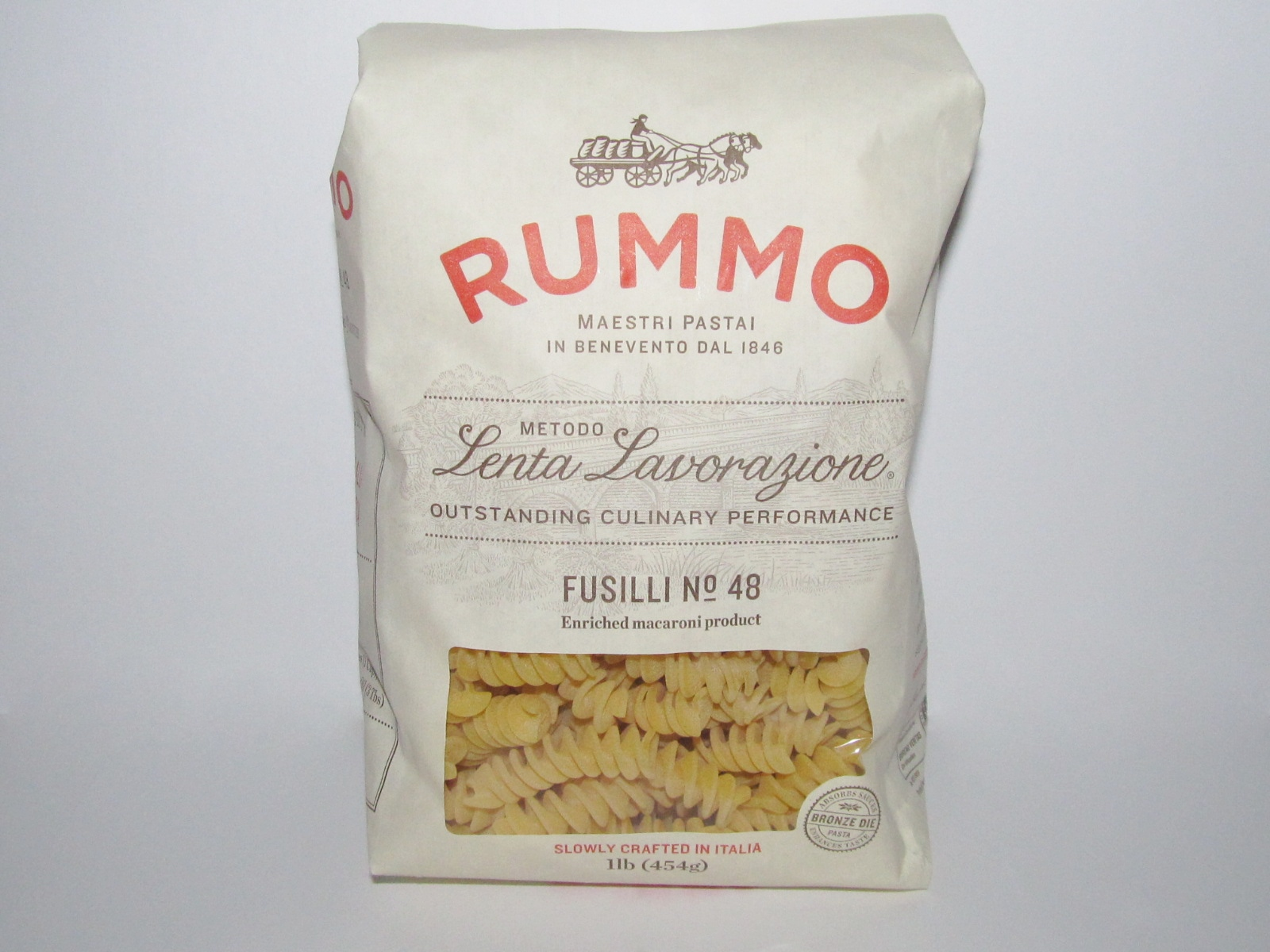
Packaging of Rummo fusilli pasta

Rummo SpA is an Italian food company manufacturing pasta, pasta sauce, and pesto. With more than 160 employees and an annual turnover of 122 million euros, it is among the largest pasta manufacturers in Italy, and exports its products to over 60 countries worldwide.

== History ==
Rummo was founded in 1846 by Antonio Rummo in Benevento, Italy. The company moved its headquarters to Via dei Mulini in 1935.

In October 2015, the company suffered massive damage due to a severe storm, which nearly led to its bankruptcy. To mark Rummo's 175th anniversary, a commemorative stamp featuring the company's logo was issued in June 2021. In 2025, Rummo introduced its high-proteine Organic Maxima line. That year, the company reported a revenue exceeding €750 million, and ranked among the 10 largest Italian pasta manufacturing companies. In the United States, the Rummo brand has been particularly on the rise since the 2020s, as reported by Antonio Rummo, the sixth-generation grandson of the company's founder.
