= Aulepa =

Village in Estonia

Aulepa Dirslätt (in Swedish) Dihlet (Estonian Swedish)
- Village
- Location in Estonia
- Coordinates: 59°04′22″N 23°35′31″E
- Country: Estonia
- County: Lääne County
- Municipality: Lääne-Nigula Parish

Population (2011 Census)
  - Total: 12

Aulepa (Swedish: Dirslätt; Estonian Swedish: Dihlet) is a village in Lääne-Nigula Parish, Lääne County, in western Estonia.

Before the administrative reform in 2017, the village was in Noarootsi Parish.

== Demographics ==
As of the 2011 census, the settlement's population was 12.

	Population
2006	17
2007	18
2008	17
2009	17
2010	19
2011	19
