= Tahu, Estonia =

Village in Estonia

Coordinates: 58°59′N 23°33′E

Tahu
- Village
- Interactive map of Tahu
- Country: Estonia
- County: Lääne County
- Parish: Lääne-Nigula Parish
- Time zone: UTC+2 (EET)
  - Summer (DST): UTC+3 (EEST)

Tahu (Swedish: Skåtanäs) is a village in Lääne-Nigula Parish, Lääne County, in western Estonia.
