= Hosby, Lääne-Nigula Parish =

Village in Estonia

Coordinates: 59°02′18″N 23°30′38″E

Hosby
- Village
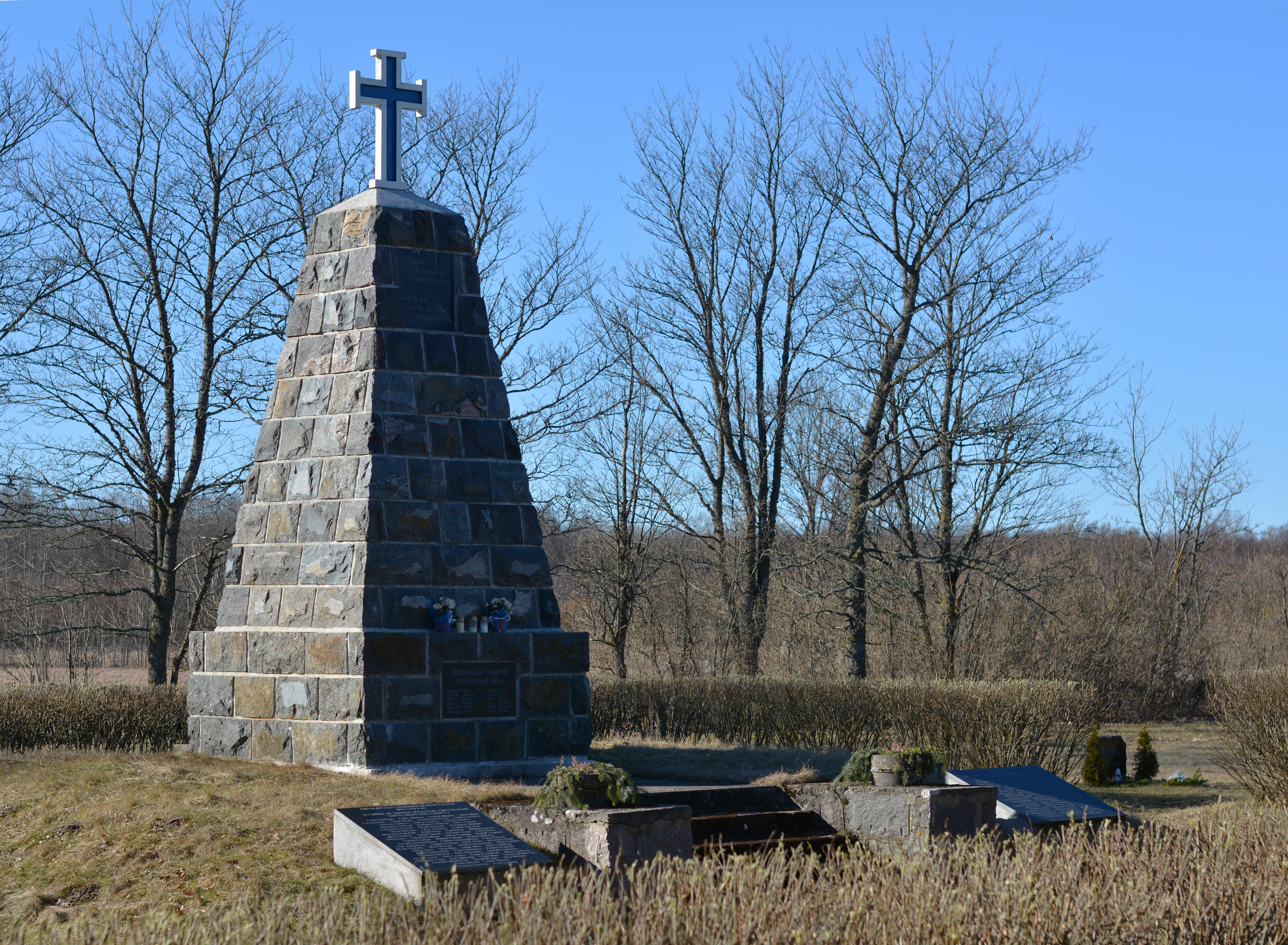
- Estonian War of Independence memorial in Hosby
- Interactive map of Hosby
- Country: Estonia
- County: Läänemaa (West-County)
- Parish: Lääne-Nigula Parish
- Time zone: UTC+2 (EET)
  - Summer (DST): UTC+3 (EEST)

Hosby is a village in Lääne-Nigula Parish, Lääne County, in western Estonia. Before the administrative reform in 2017, the village was in Noarootsi Parish.
