= Rummu, Kuusalu Parish =

Village in Estonia

Coordinates: 59°26′45″N 25°18′37″E

Rummu
- Village
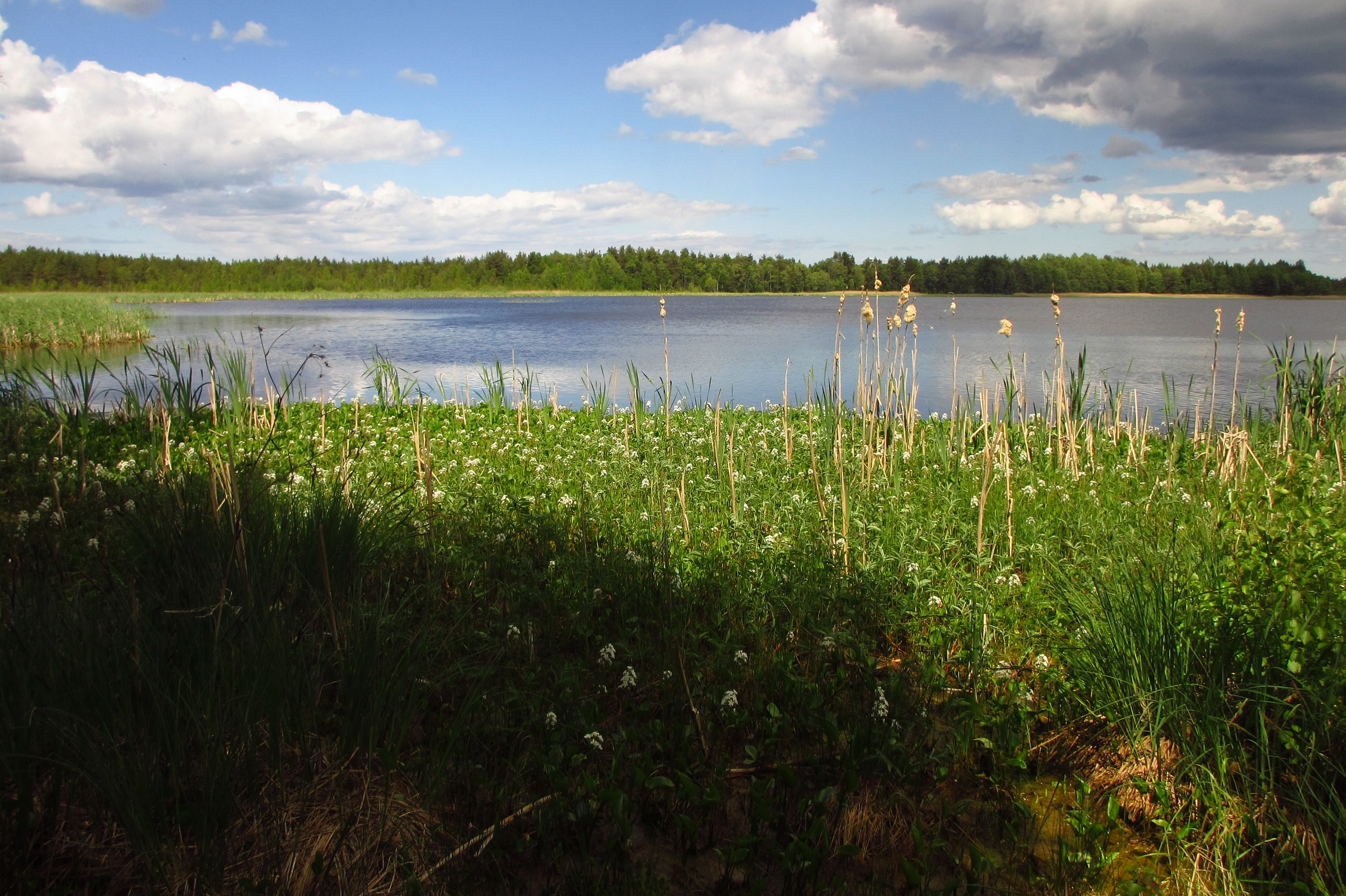
- Lake Hub
- Interactive map of Rummu
- Country: Estonia
- County: Harju County
- Parish: Kuusalu Parish
- Time zone: UTC+2 (EET)
  - Summer (DST): UTC+3 (EEST)

Rummu (German: Rumm) is a village in Kuusalu Parish, Harju County in northern Estonia.
