= Nõmmküla, Rapla County =

Village in Estonia

Coordinates: 58°53′23″N 24°41′21″E

Nõmmküla
- Village
- Interactive map of Nõmmküla
- Country: Estonia
- County: Rapla County
- Parish: Rapla Parish
- Time zone: UTC+2 (EET)
  - Summer (DST): UTC+3 (EEST)

Nõmmküla is a village in Rapla Parish, Rapla County in northwestern Estonia. Between 1991–2017 (until the administrative reform of Estonian municipalities) the village was located in Raikküla Parish.
