= Hara, Lääne County =

Village in Estonia

Coordinates: 59°05′N 23°31′E

Hara
- Village
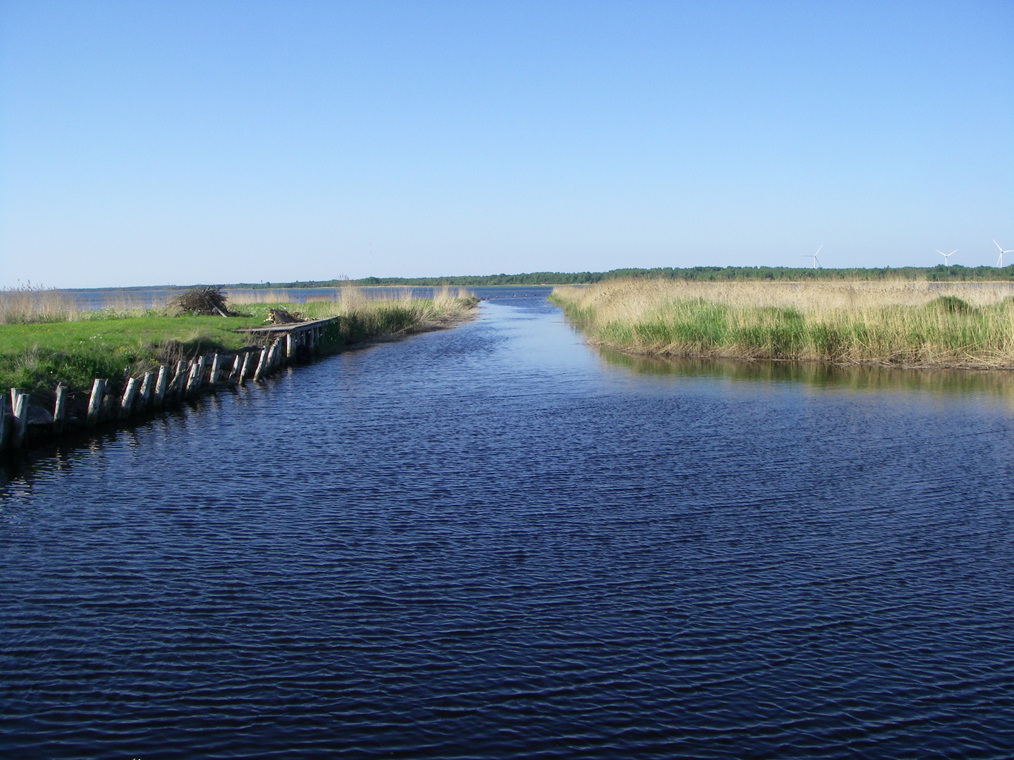
- Hara harbour canal
- Interactive map of Hara
- Country: Estonia
- County: Lääne County
- Parish: Lääne-Nigula Parish
- Time zone: UTC+2 (EET)
  - Summer (DST): UTC+3 (EEST)

Hara (Swedish: Harga) is a village in Lääne-Nigula Parish, Lääne County, in western Estonia. Before the administrative reform in 2017, the village was in Noarootsi Parish.
