= 2026 World Athletics U20 Championships – Women's pole vault =

Women's pole vault at the 2026 World Athletics U20 Championships
- Venue: Hayward Field
- Dates: 5 August (Qualification); 8 August (Final)
- Competitors: 25 from 19 nations
- Winning height: 4.45 m

Medalists
gold medal	Nicole Krutilová	Czech Republic
silver medal	Olha Belchenko	Ukraine
bronze medal	Kylie Neira	United States

The women's pole vault at the 2026 World Athletics U20 Championships was held at Hayward Field in Eugene, United States on 5 and 7 August 2026.

== Records ==
U20 standing records prior to the 2026 World Athletics U20 Championships were as follows:

Record	Athlete & Nationality	Mark	Location	Date
World U20 Record	Wilma Murto (FIN)	4.71 m	Zweibrücken, Germany	31 January 2016
Championship Record	Angelica Moser (SUI)	4.55 m	Bydgoszcz, Poland	21 July 2016
World U20 Leading	Hannah Grace (USA)	4.54 m	Eugene, United States	11 June 2026

== Results ==
=== Qualification ===
Qualification took place in the afternoon session on 5 August 2026. Athletes attaining a mark of at least 4.25 metres (Q) or at least the 12 best performers (q) will qualify for the final.

==== Group A ====
Place	Athlete	Nation	3.60	3.80	3.95	4.10	4.20	4.25	Results	Notes
1	Olha Belchenko	Ukraine	–	0	o	o			4.10 m	q
2	Anna Cherkashina	Kazakhstan	o	o	o	xo			4.10 m	q, NU20R
2	Jamison Harding	Australia	–	–	o	xo			4.10 m	q
2	Anna Hiesinger	Germany	–	o	o	xo			4.10 m	q
5	Kyani Joosten	Belgium	–	o	xo	xo			4.10 m	q
6	Kylie Neira	United States	–	o	o	xxo			4.10 m	q
6	Moana Peyrard	France	–	–	–	xxo			4.10 m	q
8	Embla Matilde Njerve	Norway	–	o	xo	xxx			3.95 m	
9	Liana Boľošová	Slovakia	xxo	o	xo	xxx			3.95 m	
10	Melina Häuptli	Switzerland	o	o	xxo	xxx			3.95 m	
11	Dorka Farkas	Hungary	o	o	xxx				3.80 m	
12	Quinty Keijsers	Netherlands	o	xo	xxx				3.80 m	

==== Group B ====
Place	Athlete	Nation	3.60	3.80	3.95	4.10	4.20	4.25	Results	Notes
1	Lotte Gretzler	Germany	–	–	o	o			4.10 m	q
1	Nicole Krutilová	Czech Republic	–	–	–	o			4.10 m	q
1	Allika Inkeri Moser	Estonia	–	–	–	o			4.10 m	q
4	Katherine Blue	United States	–	o	o	xo			4.10 m	q
4	Beate Pott	Sweden	o	o	o	xo			4.10 m	q
6	Julie Bourgis	France	–	–	o	xxo			4.10 m	q
7	Renata Bergstrom	Sweden	xo	o	o	xxx			3.95 m	
8	Mackenzie Hurtubise	Canada	–	–	xo	xxx			3.95 m	
8	Letizia Paolatto	Italy	o	o	xo	xxx			3.95 m	
10	Anastasia Boumpoulidi	Greece	–	–	xxo	xxx			3.95 m	
11	Khushnoor Rangi	Australia	–	o	xxx				3.80 m	
12	Amélie Ledermann	Switzerland	xo	o	xxx				3.80 m	
—	Yarden Mantel	Israel	–	xxx					NM	

=== Final ===
The final took place in the afternoon session on 8 August 2026.

Place	Athlete	Nation	3.95	4.10	4.25	4.35	4.40	4.45	4.50	Results	Notes
1st place, gold medalist(s)	Nicole Krutilová	Czech Republic	–	xo	o	o	o	o	xxx	4.45 m	
2nd place, silver medalist(s)	Olha Belchenko	Ukraine	o	0	xo	o	o	x–	xx	4.40 m	PB
3rd place, bronze medalist(s)	Kylie Neira	United States	o	o	xxo	o	xxx			4.35 m	PB
4	Jamison Harding	Australia	xo	o	xo	xxo	xxx			4.35 m	PB
5	Allika Inkeri Moser	Estonia	–	o	o	xx–	x			4.25 m	
5	Moana Peyrard	France	–	o	o	xxx				4.25 m	
7	Lotte Gretzler	Germany	o	o	xxx					4.10 m	
7	Anna Hiesinger	Germany	o	o	xxx					4.10 m	
9	Julie Bourgis	France	xxo	o	xxx					4.10 m	
10	Kyani Joosten	Belgium	o	xo	xxx					4.10 m	
11	Anna Cherkashina	Kazakhstan	xo	xo	xxx					4.10 m	NU20R
12	Katherine Blue	United States	o	xxx						3.95 m	
	Beate Pott	Sweden								DNS	
