= Pinja Kärhä =

Finnish hammer thrower (born 2007)

Personal information
- Born: 20 March 2007 (age 19)

Sport
- Sport: Athletics
- Event: Hammer throw
Medal record
Women's athletics
Representing Finland
World U20 Championships
| Silver medal – second place | 2026 Eugene | Hammer throw |
European U20 Championships
| Bronze medal – third place | 2025 Tampere | Hammer throw |

Pinja Kärhä (born 20 March 2007) is a Finnish hammer thrower.

== Biography ==
Kärhä won the bronze medal at the 2025 European Athletics U20 Championships in Tampere, Finland, with a throw of 66.07 metres.

In June 2026, she set a personal best of 70.73 metres at the Lahti GP competition in Finland. Competing at the 2026 World Athletics U20 Championships in Eugene, USA, she qualified for the final with the best throw in her qualifying group with 67.51m metres, before winning the silver medal in the final behind Clara Hegemann of Germany.
