= Tianna Springer =

Guyanese sprinter

Personal information
- Born: 24 September 2007 (age 19)

Sport
- Sport: Athletics
- Event: Sprint

Achievements and titles
- Personal bests: 100m: 11.70 (Leonora, 2023); 200m: 23.53 (Leonora, 2023); 400m: 52.31 (St George's, 2024)
Medal record
Women's athletics
Representing Guyana
World U20 Championships
Bronze medal – third place	2026 Eugene	400m
South American U20 Championships
Gold medal – first place	2023 Bogotá	400 m
Bronze medal – third place	2023 Bogotá	200 m
Commonwealth Youth Games
Gold medal – first place	2023 Trinbago	400 m
Gold medal – first place	2023 Trinbago	4x400 m mixed relay
CARIFTA Games (U20)
Gold medal – first place	2024 St George's	400 m
Gold medal – first place	2024 St George's	Mixed relay
Gold medal – first place	2025 Port of Spain	400 m
Gold medal – first place	2026 St George's	400 m
Gold medal – first place	2026 St George's	Mixed relay
CARIFTA Games (U17)
Gold medal – first place	2023 Nassau	400 m

Tianna Springer (born 24 September 2007) is a Guyanese sprinter. A multiple-time gold medal winner in junior categories, Springer became the senior national champion over 100 metres in 2025.

== Early and personal life ==
Born to Mechel Rose Springer in 2007, she attended Chases Academic Foundation secondary school in Georgetown, Guyana on a scholarship from 2023. In 2025, she committed to attend the University of Georgia in the United States on a scholarship.

== Career ==
In 2023, Springer the Guyanese U-18 titles over 100 metres, 200 metres, 400 metres and 800 metres, setting multiple meeting record times.

Springer won the gold medal over 400 metres in the under-17 category at the 2023 CARIFTA Games in April 2023. She was then a gold medalist competing over 400 metres at the 2023 Commonwealth Youth Games in Trinidad and Tobago, running a personal best time of 53.55 seconds. She also ran the anchor leg for the Guyanese mixed 4 × 400 m relay team at the Games, winning the gold medal in the event in a Games record time of 3:22.07 seconds, surpassing the previous mark of set by Australia in 2017. That year, she also won the gold medal as a fifteen-year-old at the South American U-20 championships in Bogotá, Colombia, setting a championship record time of 53.28s, beating the previous mark set in 2009 by Barbara De Oliveira of Brazil. Springer also won the bronze medal in the 200 metres at the championships, with a time of 23.72 seconds.

Springer won the 400 metres in a personal best time of 52.31 seconds in the under-20 category at the 2024 CARIFTA Games in St George's, Grenada. That year, she signed a Name, Image and Likeness (NIL) contract with Adidas, as a consequence Adidas supplied kit to the whole Guyana team competing at the 2024 CARIFTA Games.

In April 2025, Springer won the U20 girls' 400 metres final in 53.07 at the 2025 CARIFTA Games in Port of Spain, Trinidad and Tobago. Competing as a member of Police Progressive Sports Club, she won the senior Guyanese national championships over 100 metres in June 2025 as an 18-year-old, running a wind assisted 11.52 seconds (+3.3 m/s). She also placed third over 200 metres at the championships.

In April 2026, Springer won her fourth consecutive 400 m title across age groups at the 2026 CARIFTA Games, winning in a time of 52.47 seconds. Later at the championships, she was part of the Guyana mixed 4 × 400 m relay which set a new Games record of 3:20.79. In the final of the 400 metres at the 2026 World Athletics U20 Championships in August, she won the bronze medal behind Anastazja Kuś of Poland and Ataja Stephane-Vazquez of the United States, running 51.76 seconds. She became only the second Guyanese athlete to win a medal at the championships.
