= Su Yixin =

Chinese athlete (born 2007)

Personal information
- Born: 27 May 2007 (age 19)

Sport
- Sport: Athletics
- Event: Discus throw
Medal record
Women's athletics
Representing China
World U20 Championships
Gold medal – first place	2026 Eugene	Discus

Su Yixin (born 27 May 2007) is a Chinese discus thrower. She was the World U20 champion in 2026.

== Biography ==
From Sichuan province, Su won the World U20 Championships in the discus throw on 6 August 2026, winning ahead of Jaslene Massey of the United States and bronze medalist Marina Hadjicosta of Cyprus. Su opened round one of the competition held in Eugene, United States, with a throw of 59.32 metres to take an early lead. She followed in the following rounds with 57.12m and 58.64m and maintained her lead, without increasing it. However, Su completed the competition with a bigger throw of 61.06 metres in the final round to seal the gold medal and the title. Su had previously also led the qualifiers in the preliminary round, with a throw of 58.06 metres.
