= 2026 World Athletics U20 Championships – Women's 4 × 400 metres relay =

Women's 4 × 400 metres relay at the 2026 World Athletics U20 Championships
- Venue: Hayward Field
- Dates: 8 August (Round 1); 9 August (Final)
- Competitors: 94 from 22 nations
- Winning time: 3:29.15 WU20L

Medalists
gold medal	Ashtyn Lewis; Olivia Harris; Clara Adams; Taylor-Nicole Overton; Sydney Kuhn*	United States
silver medal	Shari Hurdman; Xanthee Watts; Charlotte McAuliffe; Alice Hill	Australia
bronze medal	Caitlin Hadfield; Shiloh Omotosho; Casey Musgrave; Camiah Bennett; Noa Chodokufa*	Great Britain

The women's 4 × 400 metres relay at the 2026 World Athletics U20 Championships was held at Hayward Field in Eugene, United States on 8 and 9 August 2026.

== Records ==
U20 standing records prior to the 2026 World Athletics U20 Championships were as follows:

Record	Nation	Mark	Location	Date
World U20 Record	United States	3:27.60	Grosseto, Italy	18 July 2004
Championship Record	United States	3:27.60	Grosseto, Italy	18 July 2004
World U20 Leading	United States	3:29.71	Gainesville, United States	4 April 2026

== Results ==
=== Round 1 ===
Round 1 took place in the morning session on 8 August 2026. First 3 of each heat (Q) qualify to the final.

==== Heat 1 ====
Place	Lane	Nation	Athletes	Time	Notes
1	8	United States	Ashtyn Lewis, Taylor-Nicole Overton, Sydney Kuhn, Olivia Harris	3:32.66	Q
2	3	Australia	Shari Hurdman, Xanthee Watts, Charlotte McAuliffe, Alice Hill	3:33.68	Q, SB
3	7	India	Bhoomika Nehate, Tahura Khatun, Tanu Chaudhary, Thiya Arumugam	3:39.53	Q
4	6	Slovakia	Lenka Gymerská, Lucia Bortlíková, Anabel Beláková, Katka Mičániová	3:39.93	NU20R
5	4	Belgium	Maya Wintquin, Ellemieke Maenhoudt, Sterre Provost, Marie-Lou Warnier	3:42.24	
6	5	Barbados	Ariel Archer, Ashlyn Simmons, Nyah Clarke, Aniya Nurse	3:43.20	
	2	Bahamas		DNS	

==== Heat 2 ====
Place	Lane	Nation	Athletes	Time	Notes
1	7	Italy	Matilde Abelli, Laura Frattaroli, Alicya Maria Trotta, Giulia Macchi	3:33.63	Q, NU20R
2	8	Great Britain	Caitlin Hadfield, Shiloh Omotosho, Noa Chodokufa, Camiah Bennett	3:33.82	Q, SB
3	2	Nigeria	Becky Ebiyadi, Jecinta Lawrence, Tejiri Praise Ugoh, Faith Ezechukwu	3:35.28	Q, SB
4	9	South Africa	Davida Strong, Christi Loggenberg, Zanté van der Merwe, Isabella Gunter	3:36.92	SB
5	6	Canada	Sasha Salwonchuk, Mary Maclean, Kate Fink, Charlotte Bosma	3:38.41	SB
6	3	Spain	Rocio Navarro, Ana Alba Ruiz, Carla Rodríguez, Alaine Aguerralde	3:38.70	SB
7	5	Ireland	Maria Zakharenko, Sofia Granjo, Róisín Murray, Erin Friel	3:40.06	
8	4	Mexico	Regina Maldonado, Alisson Judith Martinez, Susana Montes, Paula Díaz	3:48.07	

==== Heat 3 ====
Place	Lane	Nation	Athletes	Time	Notes
1	9	Germany	Ida Carlotta Schröder, Luna Fischer, Hannah Schwind, Eni Kuske	3:34.35	Q, SB
2	2	Slovenia	Mija MarušIč, Manca Marčelja, Gaja Kovačec, Maša Medjimurec	3:35.60	Q, NU20R
3	3	Jamaica	Daniellia Dixon, Kristen Herbert, Davine Dickenson, Shanika Lindsay	3:35.93	Q
4	4	Poland	Jasmine Maria Kanakanti, Maja Zbielska, Maja Małyszek, Lena Pajęcka	3:37.41	SB
5	8	Czech Republic	Nela Bořková, Kateřina Čechová, Viktorie Kulhánková, Sophie Pischnothová	3:38.07	SB
6	5	Brazil	Hemily de Jesus, Luana Cibele Sousa, Isadora Justiniana, Leticia Evelyn Lopes	3:40.65	SB
7	6	Ecuador	Gloria Cañola, Pamela Nicol Barreto, Daniela Astrid Castro, Génesis Nicole Cañola	3:43.02	NU20R
8	7	New Zealand	Kendra Scally-Tu'i, Boh Ritchie, Mia de Jager, Poppy Healy	3:44.68	SB

=== Final ===
The final took place in the afternoon session on 9 August 2026.

Place	Lane	Nation	Athletes	Time	Notes
1st place, gold medalist(s)	6	United States	Ashtyn Lewis, Olivia Harris, Clara Adams, Taylor-Nicole Overton	3:29.15	WU20L
2nd place, silver medalist(s)	4	Australia	Shari Hurdman, Xanthee Watts, Charlotte McAuliffe, Alice Hill	3:33.68	Q, SB
3rd place, bronze medalist(s)	8	Great Britain	Caitlin Hadfield, Shiloh Omotosho, Casey Musgrave, Camiah Bennett	3:32.08	SB
4	9	Slovenia	Mija MarušIč, Živa Remic, Manca Marčelja, Maša Medjimurec	3:32.26	NU20R
5	7	Germany	Eni Kuske, Luna Fischer, Ida Carlotta Schröder, Rebekka Feirle	3:34.08	SB
6	2	Jamaica	Daniellia Dixon, Kristen Herbert, Davine Dickenson, Kevongaye Fowler	3:34.28	
7	5	Italy	Margherita Castellani, Laura Frattaroli, Matilde Abelli, Giulia Macchi	3:35.61	
8	3	Nigeria	Faith Ezechukwu, Jecinta Lawrence, Tejiri Praise Ugoh, Becky Ebiyadi	3:36.89	
9	1	India	Bhoomika Nehate, Tahura Khatun, Tanu Chaudhary, Thiya Arumugam	3:45.28	
