= 2026 World Athletics U20 Championships – Men's pole vault =

Men's pole vault at the 2026 World Athletics U20 Championships
- Venue: Hayward Field
- Dates: 6 August (Qualification); 9 August (Final)
- Competitors: 22 from 15 nations
- Winning height: 5.80 m

Medalists
gold medal	Zackaria Dia	France
silver medal	Henri Apri	Estonia
bronze medal	Isaiah Whitaker	United States

The men's pole vault at the 2026 World Athletics U20 Championships was held at Hayward Field in Eugene, United States on 6 and 9 August 2026.

== Records ==
U20 standing records prior to the 2026 World Athletics U20 Championships were as follows:

Record	Athlete & Nationality	Mark	Location	Date
World U20 Record	Armand Duplantis (SWE)	6.05 m	Berlin, Germany	12 August 2018
Championship Record	Armand Duplantis (SWE)	5.82 m	Tampere, Finland	14 July 2018
World U20 Leading	Zackaria Dia (FRA)	5.82 m	Pierre-Bénite, France	13 June 2026

== Results ==
=== Qualification ===
Qualification took place in the afternoon session on 6 August 2026.

==== Group A ====
Place	Athlete	Nation	4.60	4.80	4.95	5.10	5.25	5.35	Results	Notes
1	Axel Rogö	Sweden	-	-	o	o	xo		5.25 m	q
2	Kaito Taniguchi	Japan	-	-	o	xo	xo		5.25 m	q
3	Alois Gellens	France	-	xo	xo	o	xxo		5.25 m	q
4	Christoforos Litsardopoulos	Greece	o	o	o	o	xxx		5.10 m	q
5	Gabriel Genest	Canada	-	-	-	xo	x-	xx	5.10 m	
5	Lukas Brauc	Germany	-	o	o	xo	xxx		5.10 m	
5	Leonardo Scalon	Italy	-	-	-	xo	xxx		5.10 m	
8	Abdulla Saad Al-Abdulla	Qatar	o	o	o	xxx			4.95 m	
8	Bohdan Holovko	Ukraine	-	o	o	xxx			4.95 m	
10	Enzo Martinez	Spain	-	xo	xxo	xxx			4.95 m	

==== Group B ====
Place	Athlete	Nation	4.60	4.80	4.95	5.10	5.25	5.35	Results	Notes
1	Zackaria Dia	France	-	-	-	o	o		5.25 m	q
2	Naoya Inoue	Japan	-	-	xo	xxo	o		5.25 m	q
3	Jaxon Jerabek	United States	-	-	-	o	xo		5.25 m	q
3	Isaiah Whitaker	United States	-	-	-	-	xo		5.25 m	q
5	Zeng Liang	China	-	-	-	xxo	xo		5.25 m	q
6	Henri Apri	Estonia	-	-	-	-	xxo		5.25 m	q
6	Marco Rodriguez	Spain	-	-	o	o	xxo		5.25 m	q
8	Topias Mustonen	Finland	-	-	-	o	xxx		5.10 m	q
9	Mathias Urbanczyk	Belgium	-	-	o	xo	xxx		5.10 m	
10	Martin Plakk	Estonia	-	o	o	xxx			4.95 m	
10	Liam Wikerd	Canada	o	o	o	xxx			4.95 m	
12	Ben Silas Kribelbauer	Germany	-	xo	xo	xxx			4.95 m	

=== Final ===
The final took place in the morning session on 9 August 2026.

Place	Athlete	Nation	5.00	5.20	5.35	5.45	5.50	5.55	5.60	5.65	5.70	5.75	5.80	5.85	Results	Notes
1st place, gold medalist(s)	Zackaria Dia	France	-	-	o	-	xo	-	x-	o	o	o	o	xxx	5.80 m	
2nd place, silver medalist(s)	Henri Apri	Estonia	-	xxo	o	xo	-	xxo	-	o	x-	o	-	xxx	5.75 m	NU20R
3rd place, bronze medalist(s)	Isaiah Whitaker	United States	-	o	xo	xo	xx-	-	x						5.45 m	
4	Naoya Inoue	Japan	o	xxo	xxo	xo	xxx								5.45 m	
5	Marco Rodriguez	Spain	-	xxo	o	xxx									5.35 m	PB
6	Topias Mustonen	Finland	o	xo	xo	xxx									5.35 m	PB
7	Axel Rogö	Sweden	-	xo	-	xxx									5.20 m	
8	Alois Gellens	France	o	xxo	xxx										5.20 m	
9	Kaito Taniguchi	Japan	xo	xxo	xxx										5.20 m	
10	Christoforos Litsardopoulos	Greece	o	xxx											5.00 m	
	Zeng Liang	China	-	xxx											NM	
	Jaxon Jerabek	United States	-	o	xo	o	o	-	o	x-	xx				DSQ	TR7.1
