= 2026 World Athletics U20 Championships – Women's 400 metres =

Women's 400 metres at the 2026 World Athletics U20 Championships
- Venue: Hayward Field
- Dates: 6 August (Round 1 & Semi-finals); 7 August (Final)
- Competitors: 57
- Winning time: 51.06

Medalists
gold medal	Anastazja Kuś	Poland
silver medal	Ataja Stephane-Vazquez	United States
bronze medal	Tianna Springer	Guyana

The women's 400 metres at the 2026 World Athletics U20 Championships was held at Hayward Field in Eugene, United States on 6 and 7 August 2026.

== Records ==
U20 standing records prior to the 2026 World Athletics U20 Championships were as follows:

Record	Athlete & Nationality	Mark	Location	Date
World U20 Record	Grit Breuer (GER)	49.42	Tokyo, Japan	27 August 1991
Championship Record	Ashley Spencer (USA)	50.50	Barcelona, Spain	13 July 2012
World U20 Leading	Skyler Franklin (USA)	50.83	Lexington, United States	30 May 2026

== Results ==
=== Round 1 ===
Round 1 took place in the morning session on 6 August 2026.

==== Heat 1 ====
Place	Lane	Athlete	Nation	Time	Notes
1	7	Anastazja Kuś	Poland	52.55	Q
2	8	Shari Hurdman	Australia	53.03	Q
3	9	Luna Fischer	Germany	53.17	Q
4	2	Zhou Wenyu	China	54.31	q
5	5	Sasha Salwonchuk	Canada	54.87	
6	3	Manca Marčelja	Slovenia	55.29	
7	4	Isadora Justiniana	Brazil	55.50	
8	6	De'Cheynelle Thomas	Saint Kitts and Nevis	55.61	

==== Heat 2 ====
Place	Lane	Athlete	Nation	Time	Notes
1	6	Lenka Gymerská	Slovakia	53.54	Q
2	8	Matilde Abelli	Italy	53.88	Q
3	4	Shameika McLean	Jamaica	53.95	Q
4	9	Génesis Nicole Cañola	Ecuador	54.43	q
5	3	Joelle Hausammann	Switzerland	55.33	
6	2	Lilje Lopes Patey	Norway	55.47	
7	7	Dianelis Rivera	Puerto Rico	55.51	
8	5	Nerina Pápai	Hungary	56.53	

==== Heat 3 ====
Place	Lane	Athlete	Nation	Time	Notes
1	3	Ataja Stephane-Vazquez	United States	51.44	Q
2	8	Casey Musgrave	Great Britain	53.25	Q
3	9	Laura Frattaroli	Italy	53.85	Q
4	6	Teodora Popović	Serbia	54.00	q, PB
5	7	Kettia Ambrose	Antigua and Barbuda	54.36	q
6	2	Madeleine Waddell	New Zealand	54.48	
7	1	Lucia Bortlíková	Slovakia	55.20	
8	4	Isabel Quiroz	Peru	55.60	
9	5	Ji-woo Choi	South Korea	57.35	

==== Heat 4 ====
Place	Lane	Athlete	Nation	Time	Notes
1	5	Tianna Springer	Guyana	52.39	Q
2	7	Maša Medjimurec	Slovenia	53.72	Q
3	8	Eni Kuske	Germany	53.97 [.966]	Q
4	6	Jecinta Lawrence	Nigeria	53.97 [.966]	q
5	4	Daniela Astrid Castro	Ecuador	55.19	
6	9	Sofya Kidenko	Kazakhstan	56.29	
7	3	Sara Cuesta	Colombia	57.12	
8	2	Aishatu Jaffar	Ghana	DQ	

==== Heat 5 ====
Place	Lane	Athlete	Nation	Time	Notes
1	3	Alice Hill	Australia	53.82	Q
2	7	Tyhra Charles	Saint Vincent and the Grenadines	54.02	Q
3	2	Keyezra Thomas	Bahamas	54.33	Q
4	4	Kaliyah Jones	Saint Kitts and Nevis	54.65	PB
5	6	Christi Loggenberg	South Africa	54.83	
6	9	Mia de Jager	New Zealand	55.31	
7	5	Kayla Charles	Trinidad and Tobago	55.89	

==== Heat 6 ====
Place	Lane	Athlete	Nation	Time	Notes
1	3	Daniellia Dixon	Jamaica	53.19	Q
2	7	Davida Strong	South Africa	53.26	Q
3	5	Kenya Maturana	Mexico	53.31	Q, PB
4	4	Kadia Rock	Barbados	53.32	q
5	2	Charlotte Bosma	Canada	54.76	
6	9	Hemily de Jesus	Brazil	56.16 [.153]	
7	8	Alexis Roberts	Bahamas	56.16 [.157]	
8	6	Szonja Keszthelyi	Hungary	56.24	

==== Heat 7 ====
Place	Lane	Athlete	Nation	Time	Notes
1	2	Clara Adams	United States	53.54	Q
2	4	Shade Laporal	France	54.04	Q
3	6	Faith Ezechukwu	Nigeria	54.38	Q
4	5	Annette McGrath	Haiti	55.08	
5	1	Alisson Judith Martinez	Mexico	55.53	
6	7	Ilaha Guliyeva	Azerbaijan	55.55	
7	8	Judith Sintila	Kenya	56.16	
8	9	Silvanilda Carina Delgado Gomes	Cape Verde	56.61	PB
9	3	Kyah Hyson	Trinidad and Tobago	57.58	

=== Semi-finals ===
The semi-finals took place in the afternoon session on 6 August 2026.

==== Heat 1 ====
Place	Lane	Athlete	Nation	Time	Notes
1	5	Anastazja Kuś	Poland	52.43	Q
2	7	Clara Adams	United States	52.81	Q
3	2	Kadia Rock	Barbados	53.25	Q
4	4	Davida Strong	South Africa	53.37	
5	6	Daniellia Dixon	Jamaica	53.77	
6	8	Luna Fischer	Germany	53.96	
7	1	Génesis Nicole Cañola	Ecuador	54.00	
8	3	Faith Ezechukwu	Nigeria	54.68	
9	9	Kenya Maturana	Mexico	54.97	

==== Heat 2 ====
Place	Lane	Athlete	Nation	Time	Notes
1	6	Ataja Stephane-Vazquez	United States	51.76	Q
2	5	Alice Hill	Australia	53.28	Q, PB
3	7	Casey Musgrave	Great Britain	53.51	Q
4	9	Shameika McLean	Jamaica	54.24	
5	4	Matilde Abelli	Italy	54.27	
6	2	Zhou Wenyu	China	54.38	
7	8	Tyhra Charles	Saint Vincent and the Grenadines	54.50	
8	3	Eni Kuske	Germany	54.53	
9	1	Teodora Popović	Serbia	55.45	

==== Heat 3 ====
Place	Lane	Athlete	Nation	Time	Notes
1	5	Tianna Springer	Guyana	52.48	Q
2	7	Lenka Gymerská	Slovakia	53.05	Q
3	4	Maša Medjimurec	Slovenia	53.09	Q
4	6	Shari Hurdman	Australia	53.44	
5	8	Shade Laporal	France	54.05	
6	2	Kettia Ambrose	Antigua and Barbuda	54.82	
7	1	Jecinta Lawrence	Nigeria	54.86	
8	3	Keyezra Thomas	Bahamas	57.84	
9	9	Laura Frattaroli	Italy	DQ	TR17.2.3

=== Final ===
The final took place in the afternoon session on 7 August 2026.

Place	Lane	Athlete	Nation	Time	Notes
1st place, gold medalist(s)	6	Anastazja Kuś	Poland	51.06	NU20R
2nd place, silver medalist(s)	5	Ataja Stephane-Vazquez	United States	51.36	
3rd place, bronze medalist(s)	7	Tianna Springer	Guyana	51.76	
4	4	Lenka Gymerská	Slovakia	52.37 [.366]	NU20R
5	3	Maša Medjimurec	Slovenia	52.37 [.368]	PB
6	1	Kadia Rock	Barbados	52.42	
7	8	Clara Adams	United States	52.76	
8	2	Casey Musgrave	Great Britain	53.07	
9	9	Alice Hill	Australia	53.16	PB
