= David Kapaiko Sekento =

Kenyan athlete (born 2010)

Personal information
- Nationality: Kenyan
- Born: 5 June 2010 (age 16)

Sport
- Sport: Athletics
- Event: Middle-distance running
Medal record
Men's athletics
Representing Kenya
World U20 Championships
Silver medal – second place	2026 Eugene	1500 m

David Kapaiko Sekento (born 5 June 2010) is a Kenyan middle-distance runner. He won a silver medal in the 1500 metres at the 2026 World Athletics U20 Championships.

== Career ==
In December 2025, he competed at the 2025 African Youth Games and won a gold medal in the 1500 metres with a time of 3:52.01. He retained his gold medal in the 1500 metres at the 2026 African Youth Games.

In August 2026, he competed at the 2026 World Athletics U20 Championships in the 1500 metres at 16 years old. During the second heat he had the fastest time of 3:43.60 to advance to the finals. During the finals he won a silver medal with a personal best time of 3:43.60.

In November 2026, he represented Kenya at the 2026 Summer Youth Olympics in the 800 metres.
