= 2026 World Athletics U20 Championships – Women's 100 metres hurdles =

Women's 100 metres hurdles at the 2026 World Athletics U20 Championships
- Venue: Hayward Field
- Dates: 7 August (Round 1 & Semi-finals); 8 August (Final)
- Competitors: 59
- Winning time: 12.91 =WU20L

Medalists
gold medal	Madeline Cooper	United States
silver medal	Tumi Ramokgopa	South Africa
bronze medal	Tiana Marshall	Jamaica

The women's 100 metres hurdles at the 2026 World Athletics U20 Championships was held at Hayward Field in Eugene, United States on 7 and 8 August 2026.

== Records ==
U20 standing records prior to the 2026 World Athletics U20 Championships were as follows:

Record	Athlete & Nationality	Mark	Location	Date
World U20 Record	Britany Anderson (JAM)	12.71	Joensuu, Finland	24 July 2019
Championship Record	Kerrica Hill (JAM)	12.77	Cali, Colombia	6 August 2022
World U20 Leading	Madeline Cooper (USA)	12.91	Eugene, United States	19 June 2026

== Results ==
=== Round 1 ===
Round 1 took place in the morning session on 7 August 2026.

==== Heat 1 ====
Place	Lane	Athlete	Nation	Time	Notes
1	7	Alessia Succo	Italy	13.27	Q
2	3	Olivia Pihl	Sweden	13.53	Q
3	8	Fiona Cavilli	Spain	13.54	Q
4	2	Saki Fujita	Japan	13.54	q
5	5	Katja Tomšič	Slovenia	13.78	
6	4	Rihana Mora	Costa Rica	13.82	
7	1	Ellen Ingrid Aadamsoo	Estonia	13.88	
8	6	Tamara Svatíková	Slovakia	14.61	
				Wind: (+0.6 m/s)	

==== Heat 2 ====
Place	Lane	Athlete	Nation	Time	Notes
1	4	Jil Sanchez	Switzerland	13.40	Q
2	9	Linnea Hirvelä	Finland	13.52	Q
3	2	Shira Kurzawa	Germany	13.56	Q
4	8	Danai-Theodora Bakogianni	Greece	13.61	q
5	3	Brooklyn Taylor	Canada	13.62	q
6	7	Aliz Ács	Hungary	13.88	
7	1	Leonor Ferreiro	Chile	14.11	
8	6	Džana Suljić	Bosnia and Herzegovina	14.64	
9	5	Hazel Wilson	Guam	15.56	
				Wind: (+0.7 m/s)	

==== Heat 3 ====
Place	Lane	Athlete	Nation	Time	Notes
1	4	Daryl Ndasi	Germany	13.20	
2	6	Laura Frličková	Slovakia	13.24	
3	5	Anni Niskala	Finland	13.64	
4	2	Jamison Harding	Australia	13.64	
5	1	Madalena Sampaio	Portugal	13.71	
6	3	Alika Harewood	Bahamas	13.89	
7	7	Yasmine Ghouibi	Tunisia	14.12	
8	8	Chisom Iheaka	Cyprus	14.64	
				Wind: (+0.1 m/s)	

==== Heat 4 ====
Place	Lane	Athlete	Nation	Time	Notes
1	4	Madeline Cooper	United States	13.36	Q
2	6	Lenny Pawlowicz	France	13.62	Q
3	1	Linda Botková	Czech Republic	13.68	Q
4	9	Orlaith Mannion	Algeria	13.73	
5	7	Jordynn Scott	Canada	13.76	
6	3	Iva Deliverska	Bulgaria	13.93	
7	8	Oda Lier	Norway	13.93	
8	5	Sara Mijanović	Bosnia and Herzegovina	14.27	
9	2	Cristina García	Mexico	14.30	
				Wind: (+0.1 m/s)	

==== Heat 5 ====
Place	Lane	Athlete	Nation	Time	Notes
1	4	Tumi Ramokgopa	South Africa	13.16	Q
2	1	Saki Nikaido	Japan	13.39	Q
3	9	Sereina Liem	Switzerland	13.45	Q
4	3	Akeelah Bell	Jamaica	13.46	q
5	8	Isabella-Sofia Mosetti	Cyprus	13.84	
6	2	Oda Hansen	Norway	13.94	
7	7	Jeidy Churi	Colombia	14.86	
8	6	Antonina Chernyshova	Kazakhstan	17.98	
9	5	Chika Bakwunye	Nigeria	DNF	
				Wind: (−0.1 m/s)	

==== Heat 6 ====
Place	Lane	Athlete	Nation	Time	Notes
1	7	Tiana Marshall	Jamaica	13.10	Q
2	6	Taylor Foster	Barbados	13.43	Q
3	8	Megan Nieman	South Africa	13.52	Q
4	2	Tammin Lampret	Australia	13.55	q
5	4	Sofia Swindell	United States Virgin Islands	13.58	q
6	3	Evelina Olsson	Sweden	13.94	
7	5	Jana Bujan	Croatia	14.32	
8	1	Beatriz Camargo	Brazil	14.35	
				Wind: (+0.3 m/s)	

==== Heat 7 ====
Place	Lane	Athlete	Nation	Time	Notes
1	2	Hana Sekne	Slovenia	13.31	Q
2	4	Tori Goodson	United States	13.36	Q
3	5	Veronica Cioccoloni	Italy	13.59	Q
4	6	Auxane Kingue	France	13.68	
5	8	Pia Lauren Matsalu	Estonia	13.83	
6	3	Iara Vacondeus	Portugal	14.06	
7	1	Alina Golovina	Kazakhstan	14.10	
8	7	Jenna-Marie Thomas	Trinidad and Tobago	14.20	
				Wind: (+0.5 m/s)	

=== Semi-finals ===
Semi-finals took place in the afternoon session on 7 August 2026.

==== Heat 1 ====
Place	Lane	Athlete	Nation	Time	Notes
1	6	Tiana Marshall	Jamaica	13.02	Q
2	5	Jil Sanchez	Switzerland	13.07	Q
3	4	Madeline Cooper	United States	13.14	Q
4	9	Sofia Swindell	U.S. Virgin Islands	13.39	NU20R
5	8	Shira Kurzawa	Germany	13.55	
6	7	Linnea Hirvelä	Finland	13.56	
7	1	Tammin Lampret	Australia	13.68	
8	2	Veronica Cioccoloni	Italy	13.77	
9	3	Olivia Pihl	Sweden	13.91	
				Wind: (+0.1 m/s)	

==== Heat 2 ====
Place	Lane	Athlete	Nation	Time	Notes
1	6	Tumi Ramokgopa	South Africa	13.02	Q
2	5	Hana Sekne	Slovenia	13.18	Q, SB
3	4	Laura Frličková	Slovakia	13.22	Q
4	3	Lenny Pawlowicz	France	13.35	
5	7	Taylor Foster	Barbados	13.43	PB
6	9	Danai-Theodora Bakogianni	Greece	13.59	NU20R
7	8	Fiona Cavilli	Spain	13.61 [.602]	
8	1	Saki Fujita	Japan	13.61 [.608]	
9	2	Anni Niskala	Finland	13.64	
				Wind: (+0.5 m/s)	

==== Heat 3 ====
Place	Lane	Athlete	Nation	Time	Notes
1	6	Daryl Ndasi	Germany	13.10	Q, PB
2	4	Tori Goodson	United States	13.16	Q
3	5	Alessia Succo	Italy	13.17	Q
4	3	Sereina Liem	Switzerland	13.32	
5	1	Akeelah Bell	Jamaica	13.52	
6	7	Saki Nikaido	Japan	13.54	
7	9	Brooklyn Taylor	Canada	13.60	
8	8	Megan Nieman	South Africa	13.65	
9	2	Linda Botková	Czech Republic	13.68	
				Wind: (+0.9 m/s)	

=== Final ===
The final took place in the afternoon session on 8 August 2026.

Place	Lane	Athlete	Nation	Time	Notes
1st place, gold medalist(s)	2	Madeline Cooper	United States	12.91	=WU20L
2nd place, silver medalist(s)	5	Tumi Ramokgopa	South Africa	12.96	
3rd place, bronze medalist(s)	6	Tiana Marshall	Jamaica	12.97	PB
4	3	Jil Sanchez	Switzerland	13.03	
5	4	Daryl Ndasi	Germany	13.11	
6	9	Alessia Succo	Italy	13.19	
7	1	Laura Frličková	Slovakia	13.23	
8	8	Hana Sekne	Slovenia	13.30	
9	7	Tori Goodson	United States	13.34	
				Wind: (−0.2 m/s)	
