= 2026 World Athletics U20 Championships – Men's 5000 metres =

Men's 5000 metres at the 2026 World Athletics U20 Championships
- Venue: Hayward Field
- Dates: 5 August (Final)
- Competitors: 22 from 16 nations
- Winning time: 13:28.27

Medalists
gold medal	Frankline Kibet	Kenya
silver medal	Nehemiah Kipgeno	Kenya
bronze medal	Damitew Kebede	Ethiopia

The men's 5000 metres at the 2026 World Athletics U20 Championships was held at Hayward Field in Eugene, United States on 5 August 2026.

== Records ==
U20 standing records prior to the 2026 World Athletics U20 Championships were as follows:

Record	Athlete & Nationality	Mark	Location	Date
World U20 Record	Selemon Barega (ETH)	12:43.02	Brussels, Belgium	31 August 2018
Championship Record	Abreham Cherkos (ETH)	13:08.57	Bydgoszcz, Poland	13 July 2008
World U20 Leading	Waberi Igueh Houssein (DJI)	12:56.12	Oordegem, Belgium	1 August 2026

== Results ==
=== Final ===
The final took place in the afternoon session on 5 August 2026.

Place	Athlete	Nation	Time	Notes
1st place, gold medalist(s)	Frankline Kibet	Kenya	13:28.27	
2nd place, silver medalist(s)	Nehemiah Kipngeno	Kenya	13:30.09	
3rd place, bronze medalist(s)	Damitew Kebede	Ethiopia	13:35.38	PB
4	Willem Renders	Belgium	13:43.41	
5	Mamaru Goadie	Ethiopia	13:44.41	
6	Magnus Øyen	Norway	13:47.10	
7	Sebastian Lörstad	Sweden	13:47.48	
8	Ryo Kurimura	Japan	13:48.85	
9	Bilal Raggad	Morocco	13:49.09	PB
10	Michael Kibet	Uganda	13:51.02	
11	Lucas Chis	Australia	13:51.40	PB
12	Juan Gonzalez	United States	13:59.00	
13	Sebastian Smed Grønkjær	Denmark	13:59.38	
14	Edwar Rely Marquez	Peru	14:00.10	NU20R
15	Njabulo Hlatswayo	South Africa	14:13.90	
16	Jack Bidwell	United States	14:18.90	
17	Philip Gulbrandsen	Norway	14:20.18	
18	Solomon Andiema	Uganda	14:26.01	
19	Alessandro Santangelo	Italy	14:29.94	
20	Bertold Kalász	Hungary	14:35.89	
21	Cillian Gleeson	Ireland	14:38.01	
22	Charles Barrett	Australia	14:43.17	
