= Clara Hegemann =

German hammer thrower (born 2007)

Personal information
- Born: 11 July 2007 (age 19)

Sport
- Sport: Athletics
- Event: Hammer throw
Medal record
Women's athletics
Representing Germany
World U20 Championships
Gold medal – first place	2026 Eugene	Hammer throw
European U18 Championships
Gold medal – first place	2024 Banska Bystavka	Hammer

Clara Hegemann (born 11 July 2007) is a German hammer thrower. She was World under-20 champion in 2026 and European under-18 champion in 2024.

== Biography ==
From Munich, she is a member of LG Stadtwerke München. Hegemann entered the 2024 European Athletics U18 Championships as the world under-18 leader, but had that taken away by a throw from Ukraine’s Polina Dzerozhynska, only to regain it again by a single centimetre with her fourth round throw. Hegemann’s German compatriot Nova Kienast won the bronze. in Banská Bystrica, Slovakia.

In 2026, she threw a national U20 record of 69.81 metres and represented Germany at the 2026 World Athletics U20 Championships, winning the gold medal with a throw of 68.99 metres.
