= Clara Adams (sprinter) =

American sprinter (born 2008)

Personal information
- Nationality: American
- Born: November 10, 2008 (age 17)

Sport
- Sport: Athletics
- Event: Sprints
Medal record
Women's athletics
Representing the United States
World U20 Championships
Gold medal – first place	2026 Eugene	4×400 m

Clara Adams (born November 10, 2008) is an American sprinter.

== Early life and education ==
Adams attended North Salinas High School and won the 400 meters at the 2025 CIF State Track and Field Championship meet with a time of 53.24 seconds. She celebrated her victory with a fire extinguisher, a move deemed unsportsmanlike by officials, and was later stripped of her state title. In June 2026, she filed a lawsuit against the California Interscholastic Federation (CIF) seeking restoration of her title, correction of the records, damages, and legal costs.

== Career ==
In August 2026, Adams competed at the 2026 World Athletics U20 Championships and was part of the American quartet that won a gold medal in the 4 × 400 metres relay with a time of 3:29.15. She also competed in the 400 metres where she won her preliminary heat and advanced to the finals.
