= Zackaria Dia =

French pole vaulter (born 2008)

Personal information
- Born: 24 May 2008 (age 18) Pont-Audemer, France
- Height: 183 cm (6 ft 0 in)
- Weight: 73 kg (161 lb)

Sport
- Country: France
- Sport: Athletics
- Event: Pole vault

Achievements and titles
- Personal best: Pole vault: 5.82 m (2026) NU20B
Medal record
Men's athletics
Representing France
World U20 Championships
Gold medal – first place	2026 Eugene	Pole vault
European U20 Championships
Silver medal – second place	2025 Tampere	Pole vault
European Youth Olympic Festival
Gold medal – first place	2025 Skopje	Pole vault

Zackaria Dia (born 24 May 2008) is a French pole vaulter. In 2026, he set a new French U20 record and moved to second on the world under-20 list behind Mondo Duplantis and won the gold medal at the World Athletics U20 Championships.

He previously won the silver medal at the 2025 European Athletics U20 Championships and the gold medal at the 2025 European Youth Olympic Festival, becoming the French junior record holder that year.

== Biography ==
A member of the Pont-Audemer Athletic Club, he took up pole vault at the age of 12 years-old, when he began to be coached by Philippe Labbé. He was educated at Vocational High School Risle-Seine in Pont-Audemer.

In 2024 at the age of 16 years-old, Dia cleared five metres for the first time in Dourdan, with a jump of 5.03 m. Soon after, in Le Havre, he achieved the third-best European performance U18 performance of the season by clearing 5.14 metres. Then, in December 2024 in Normandy, Dia cleared a personal best and moved to 1 cm of the French national under-18 record, with a clearance of 5.31 metres.

Dia became the French junior record holder with a jump of 5.34 metres on 1 February 2025, in Caen. He won the gold medal in the pole vault at the 2025 European Youth Olympic Festival in Skopje with a jump of 5.20 metres. He was the youngest athlete in the final at 17 years-old as he won the silver medal behind Axel Rogö of Sweden in the pole vault at the 2025 European Athletics U20 Championships in Tampere, Finland in August 2025, with a clearance of 5.40 metres, having entered the championships with only the fifth best personal best.

Dia set a new personal best of 5.62 metres in Caen in January 2026. He placed fifth with 5.60 metres at the senior French Indoor Athletics Championships in Aubiere. Dia cleared a personal best 5.70 metres in Rouen on 7 March 2026. In June, Dia added 12 centimetres to his personal best to improve the French U20 record previously held by Anthony Ammirati and move to second on the world U20 all-time list behind Mondo Duplantis, with a clearance of 5.82 metres at the Envol Trophée in France. He had a top-ten finish on 28 June at the 2026 Meeting de Paris. He was nominated for European Athletics Men’s Rising Star for 2026.
