= Julie Bourgis =

French pole vaulter (born 2009)

Personal information
- Born: 28 April 2009 (age 17)

Sport
- Sport: Athletics
- Event: Pole vault
Medal record
Women's athletics
Representing France
Youth Olympic Games
Gold medal – first place	2026 Dakar	Pole vault
European U18 Championships
Gold medal – first place	2026 Rieti	Pole vault

Julie Bourgis (born 28 April 2009) is a French pole vaulter. She won the gold medal at the 2026 European Athletics U18 Championships and 2026 Summer Youth Olympics.

== Career ==
From Bourlon near Cambrai in the Nord department, she is a member of AC Cambrai Athletics. Bourgis won the age-group French championships in pole vault in February 2025, with a clearance of 4.05 metres.

She won the gold medal at the 2026 European Athletics U18 Championships, finishing ahead of compatriot Isild Drouet with a championship record and personal best clearance of 4.40 metres, which she cleared at the first attempt. She had entered the competition as the number two leading European U18 behind Drouet, with a best of 4.30 metres. In August, Bourgis had a top-ten finish at the 2026 World Athletics U20 Championships in Eugene, Oregon. In November, Bourgis won the gold medal at the 2026 Summer Youth Olympics in Dakar, with a 4.20 metres clearance in the women's pole vault.
