= Chen Jiawei (hammer thrower) =

Chinese hammer thrower (born 2008)

Personal information
- Nationality: Chinese
- Born: 10 May 2008 (age 18)

Sport
- Sport: Athletics
- Event: Hammer throw
Medal record
Men's athletics
Representing China
World U20 Championships
Gold medal – first place	2026 Eugene	Hammer throw

Chen Jiawei (Chinese: 陈佳炜, born 10 May 2008) is a Chinese athlete who specializes in hammer throw. He won a gold medal in hammer throw at the 2026 World Athletics U20 Championships.

== Career ==
In August 2026, Chen competed at the 2026 World Athletics U20 Championships and won a gold medal in the hammer throw event. During qualification he set a national U20 record with a throw of 80.39 metres to advance to the finals.
