= Kayden Hulet =

American hammer thrower (born 2008)

Personal information
- Nationality: American
- Born: September 20, 2008 (age 17)
- Height: 6 ft 1 in (185 cm)
- Weight: 245 lb (111 kg)

Sport
- Sport: Athletics
- Event: Hammer throw
Medal record
Men's athletics
Representing the United States
World U20 Championships
Silver medal – second place	2026 Eugene	Hammer throw

Kayden Huelt (born September 20, 2008) is an American athlete who specializes in the hammer throw.

== Early life and education ==
Hulet attended Debbie Smith CTE Academy in Sparks, Nevada. During his senior year he swept the shot put and discus throw events at the Class 3A state meet. He also won the hammer throw at the USATF Under-20 Championships and the Nike Outdoor Nationals in June 2026. His winning throw of 252 feet, 3 inches at the Nike Nationals broke his own state record and ranked No. 1 among prep boys competitors in 2026 and No. 6 in prep history. He was subsequently named the 2026 Gatorade Nevada Boys Track and Field Player of the Year.

He is committed to compete in track and field at Ole Miss.

== Career ==
In August 2026, Hulet competed at the 2026 World Athletics U20 Championships and won a silver medal in the hammer throw with a personal best throw of 77.55 meters..
