= Charlotte McAuliffe =

Australian sprinter (born 2007)

Personal information
- Nationality: Australian
- Born: 15 February 2007 (age 19) Hong Kong

Sport
- Sport: Athletics
- Event: Sprint
Medal record
Women's athletics
Representing Australia
World U20 Championships
Silver medal – second place	2024 Lima	4x400 m relay
Silver medal – second place	2026 Eugene	4x400 m relay
Bronze medal – third place	2026 Eugene	4x400 m mixed
Commonwealth Youth Games
Bronze medal – third place	2023 Trinbago	4x400 m mixed

Charlotte McAuliffe (born 15 February 2007) is an Australian sprinter. She was a double medalist at the 2026 World Athletics U20 Championships.

== Biography ==
Born in Hong Kong to Australian parents, McAuliffe moved to Australia when she was 12 years old. She was Australian under-16 champion over both 200 metres and 400 metres before going on to win the under-18 and under-20 championship in the 400 meters in 2023 and the under-20 championship in the 400m in 2025. A member of Pembroke Athletics Club, she was part of the Australian team selected for the 2023 Commonwealth Youth Games where she placed fourth in the 400 metres final and won bronze in the mixed 4x400m relay.

In August 2024, McAuliffe ran in the qualifying round in the women's 4x400 m relay at the 2024 World Athletics U20 Championships in Lima, Peru, with the team going on to win the silver medal.

Competing at the 2026 World Athletics U20 Championships in Eugene, United States, she won the silver medal in the women's 4x400 m relay and the bronze medal in the mixed 4x400 m relay - with the team setting a new Australian and Oceania U20 mixed 4x400m record, and briefly holding the world U20 record for the event before it was surpassed at the same championships.
