= Kylie Neira =

American pole vaulter (born 2007)

Kayden Hulet
Personal information
- Nationality: American
- Born: August 15, 2007 (age 18)

Sport
- Sport: Athletics
- Event: Pole vault
Medal record
Women's athletics
Representing the United States
World U20 Championships
Bronze medal – third place	2026 Eugene	Pole vault

Kylie Neira (born August 15, 2007) is an American athlete who specializes in pole vault.

== Early life and education ==
Neira attended DeLand High School. She won the Florida High School Athletic Association (FHSAA) Class 4A pole vault title in 2023 with a personal best and school record of 3.75 meters. She repeated as Class 4A pole vault champion in 2024 with a vault of 3.9 meters. She became the first Bulldog to win two state titles in track and field since the 1960s.

She attends Florida International University where she is a member of the FIU Panthers track and field team. During the 2026 Conference USA Indoor Track & Field championship she won a gold medal in pole vault with a FIU freshman record of 4.16 meters.

== Career ==
In June 2026, Neira competed at the USATF U20 Outdoor Championships and finished in second place in the pole vault event with a 4.25 meter vault. As a result, she qualified to represent the United States at the 2026 World Athletics U20 Championships. She won a bronze medal in the pole vault with a vault of 4.35 meters. This was the best American finish in the event since Desiree Freier won silver in 2014.
