= Marcin Kuś =

Polish footballer (born 1981)

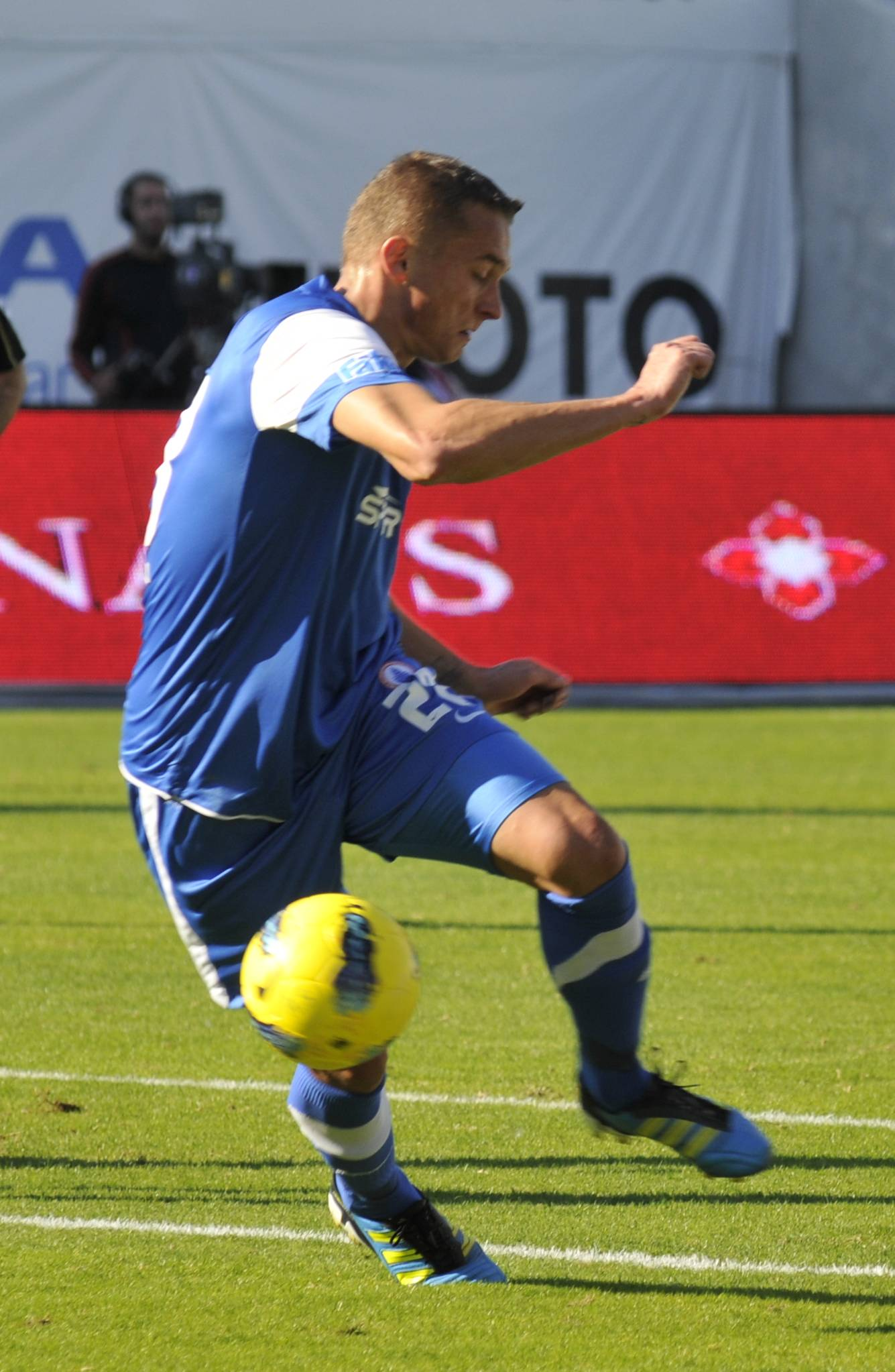
- Kuś in 2011 with İstanbul B.B.

Personal information
- Full name: Marcin Robert Kuś
- Date of birth: 2 September 1981 (age 45)
- Place of birth: Warsaw, Poland
- Height: 1.87 m (6 ft 2 in)
- Position: Right-back

Senior career*
Years	Team	Apps	(Gls)
1999–2004	Polonia Warsaw	58	(3)
2005	Lech Poznań	20	(0)
2006	Queens Park Rangers	3	(0)
2006	Torpedo Moscow	13	(0)
2007–2008	Korona Kielce	33	(1)
2008–2013	İstanbul B.B.	84	(3)
2013	Górnik Zabrze	0	(0)
2013–2014	Cracovia	16	(0)
2014–2015	Ruch Chorzów	9	(0)
Total		236	(7)

International career
2002–2008	Poland	7	(0)
- * Club domestic league appearances and goals

Marcin Robert Kuś (born 2 September 1981) is a Polish former professional footballer who played as a right-back. He was most recently the sporting director of Stomil Olsztyn. His daughter is sprinter Anastazja Kuś.

== Club career ==
Kuś previously played for Korona Kielce, after joining on a free transfer from Torpedo Moscow in February 2007. In the 2005–06 season, Kus spent the second half of the season on loan to the English Coca Cola Championship side Queens Park Rangers, making only three appearances.

In July 2008, he joined Turkish Süper Lig side İstanbul Büyükşehir Belediyespor, with whom he played for four years.

== International career ==
Kuś has made seven appearances for the Poland national team.

== Honours ==
Polonia Warsaw

- Ekstraklasa: 1999–00
- Polish Cup: 2000–01
