= 2026 World Athletics U20 Championships – Men's hammer throw =

Men's hammer throw at the 2026 World Athletics U20 Championships
- Venue: Hayward Field
- Dates: 5 August (Qualification); 7 August (Final)
- Competitors: 24 from 19 nations
- Winning distance: 79.16 m

Medalists
gold medal	Chen Jiawei	China
silver medal	Kayden Hulet	United States
bronze medal	Wyatt Larkins	Great Britain

The men's hammer throw at the 2026 World Athletics U20 Championships was held at Hayward Field in Eugene, United States on 5 and 7 August 2026.

== Records ==
U20 standing records prior to the 2026 World Athletics U20 Championships were as follows:

Record	Athlete & Nationality	Mark	Location	Date
World U20 Record	Ashraf Amgad El-Seify (QAT)	85.57 m	Barcelona, Spain	14 July 2012
Championship Record	Ashraf Amgad El-Seify (QAT)	85.57 m	Barcelona, Spain	14 July 2012
World U20 Leading	Jan Delewski (POL)	77.57 m	Warsaw, Poland	21 June 2026

== Results ==
=== Qualification ===
Qualification took place in the morning session on 5 August 2026. Athletes attaining a mark of at least 72.50 metres (Q) or at least the 12 best performers (q) will qualify for the final.

==== Group A ====
Place	Athlete	Nation	Round			Mark	Notes
Place	Athlete	Nation	#1	#2	#3	Mark	Notes
1	Jan Delewski	Poland	59.93	73.61		73.61 m	Q
2	Wyatt Larkins	Great Britain	73.10			73.10 m	Q, PB
3	Kayden Hulet	United States	69.30	x	72.83	72.83 m	Q
4	Ibrahim Abdelrahman	Qatar	66.87	69.84	71.70	71.70 m	q
5	Patry Ivan Valdez Arroyo	Ecuador	70.43	x	71.62	71.62 m	q, NU20R
6	Max Baier	Germany	68.52	70.50	71.16	71.16 m	q, PB
7	Wang Ankang	China	x	69.63	x	69.63 m	
8	Connor Hopgood	Australia	x	68.60	68.22	68.60 m	
9	Mohamed Samir Ismail Abdelghani	Egypt	67.19	68.60	x	68.60 m	
10	Sotirios Gentekos	Greece	67.63	63.91	67.77	67.77 m	
11	Haralds Nungurs	Latvia	67.50	66.72	x	67.50 m	
12	Magno Llopis	Spain	x	63.45	x	63.45 m	

==== Group B ====
Place	Athlete	Nation	Round			Mark	Notes
Place	Athlete	Nation	#1	#2	#3	Mark	Notes
1	Chen Jiawei	China	80.39			80.39 m	Q, WU20L
2	Alexandros Ghamrawi	Cyprus	71.73	72.38	71.09	72.38 m	q
3	Xavier Leauma	Australia	x	71.77	x	71.77 m	q
4	Andrew Atuobeng	Japan	71.19	x	71.20	71.20 m	q
5	Apostolos Tzamtzis	Greece	69.68	71.13	x	71.13 m	q, PB
6	Dimo Andreev	Bulgaria	x	70.90	70.44	70.90 m	q
7	Matti Hummel	Germany	x	x	70.13	70.13 m	
8	Nooa Merimaa	Finland	70.01	66.48	69.58	70.01 m	
9	Zétény Beke	Hungary	68.72	69.78	67.85	69.78 m	SB
10	Jan Pracharczyk	Poland	x	68.85	x	68.85 m	
11	Mohammed Siraj Alzayer	Saudi Arabia	65.25	x	66.94	66.94 m	
12	Vadym Klishchevskyi	Ukraine	x	x	61.06	61.06 m	

=== Final ===
The final took place in the afternoon session on 7 August 2026.

Place	Athlete	Nation	Round						Mark	Notes
Place	Athlete	Nation	#1	#2	#3	#4	#5	#6	Mark	Notes
1st place, gold medalist(s)	Chen Jiawei	China	78.47	76.54	76.99	77.57	x	79.16	79.16 m	
2nd place, silver medalist(s)	Kayden Hulet	United States	x	70.76	73.71	x	74.68	77.55	77.55 m	PB
3rd place, bronze medalist(s)	Wyatt Larkins	Great Britain	75.38	x	x	71.33	73.80	x	75.38 m	PB
4	Ibrahim Abdelrahman	Qatar	73.36	71.50	x	68.49	71.15	72.58	73.36 m	
5	Apostolos Tzamtzis	Greece	x	68.69	72.20	x	x	67.02	72.20 m	PB
6	Max Baier	Germany	x	69.40	71.45	72.18	x	x	72.18 m	PB
7	Alexandros Ghamrawi	Cyprus	72.09	71.16	x	70.73	71.39		72.09 m	
8	Xavier Leauma	Australia	71.97	x	70.87	x	x		71.97 m	
9	Andrew Atuobeng	Japan	71.87	x	x	71.58			71.87 m	
10	Jan Delewski	Poland	68.85	70.58	71.13	71.49			71.49 m	
11	Patry Ivan Valdez Arroyo	Ecuador	70.82	x	x				70.82 m	
12	Dimo Andreev	Bulgaria	59.28	67.10	66.84				67.10 m	
