= 2026 World Athletics U20 Championships – Women's long jump =

Women's long jump at the 2026 World Athletics U20 Championships
- Venue: Hayward Field
- Dates: 5 August (Qualification); 6 August (Final)
- Competitors: 27 from 19 nations
- Winning distance: 6.52 m

Medalists
gold medal	Djelika Diarra	France
silver medal	Evelyn Mitropoulou	Greece
bronze medal	Soudatou Niang	France

The women's long jump at the 2026 World Athletics U20 Championships was held at Hayward Field in Eugene, United States on 5 and 6 August 2026.

== Records ==
U20 standing records prior to the 2026 World Athletics U20 Championships were as follows:

Record	Athlete & Nationality	Mark	Location	Date
World U20 Record	Heike Drechsler (GDR)	7.14 m	Bratislava, Czechoslovakia	4 June 1983
Championship Record	Fiona May (GBR)	6.82 m	Sudbury, Canada	30 July 1988
World U20 Leading	Oluchi Ndubueze (RSA)	6.49 m	Johannesburg, South Africa	13 March 2026
World U20 Leading	Tristen Harris (USA)	6.49 m	Auburn, United States	15 May 2026

== Results ==
=== Qualification ===
Qualification took place in the morning session on 5 August 2026. Athletes attaining a mark of at least 6.35 metres (Q) or at least the 12 best performers (q) qualified for the final.

==== Group A ====
Place	Athlete	Nation	Round			Mark	Notes
Place	Athlete	Nation	#1	#2	#3	Mark	Notes
1	Evelyn Mitropoulou	Greece	6.33 (+1.4 m/s)	6.01 (+0.3 m/s)	6.11 (+0.8 m/s)	6.33 m (+1.4 m/s)	q
2	Djelika Diarra	France	x	6.28 (+0.6 m/s)	x	6.28 m (+0.6 m/s)	q
3	Daisy Snell	Great Britain	6.05 (+1.6 m/s)	6.21 (+1.9 m/s)	-	6.21 m (+1.9 m/s)	q
4	Ashlynn Norman	South Africa	6.11 (+1.1 m/s)	5.92 (+2.0 m/s)	6.09 (+1.3 m/s)	6.11 m (+1.1 m/s)	q
5	Nevia Fotak	Croatia	5.90 (+1.4 m/s)	5.83 (+1.4 m/s)	6.09 (+1.7 m/s)	6.09 m (+1.7 m/s)	q
6	Guo Siyang	China	x	6.08 (+1.5 m/s)	x	6.08 m (+1.5 m/s)	q
7	Dominika Švaňová	Slovakia	x	5.59 (−0.2 m/s)	6.07 (+0.8 m/s)	6.07 m (+0.8 m/s)	q
8	Viktória Molnár	Hungary	5.92 (+1.0 m/s)	5.97 (+1.1 m/s)	6.06 (+2.4 m/s)	6.06 m (+2.4 m/s)	q
9	Brooklyn Lyttle	Belize	x	5.88 (+0.8 m/s)	5.95 (+0.7 m/s)	5.95 m (+0.7 m/s)	
10	Parker Coes	United States	5.86 (+1.2 m/s)	5.76 (+0.8 m/s)	5.93 (+1.1 m/s)	5.93 m (+1.1 m/s)	
11	Evelina Olsson	Sweden	5.83 (+1.1 m/s)	x	x	5.83 m (+1.1 m/s)	
12	Alessandra Martina Gelpi	Italy	x	5.62 (+1.4 m/s)	5.82 (+0.5 m/s)	5.82 m (+0.5 m/s)	
13	Brooklyn Taylor	Canada	x	5.73 (−0.6 m/s)	x	5.73 m (−0.6 m/s)	
—	Felicia Felter	Netherlands	x	x	x	NM	

==== Group B ====
Place	Athlete	Nation	Round			Mark	Notes
Place	Athlete	Nation	#1	#2	#3	Mark	Notes
1	Ella Alvelin Malm	Sweden	6.36 (+0.8 m/s)			6.36 m (+0.8 m/s)	Q, PB
2	Bori Rózsahegyi	Hungary	5.88 (+1.2 m/s)	6.11 (+0.7 m/s)	6.17 (+1.0 m/s)	6.17 m (+1.0 m/s)	q
3	Soudatou Niang	France	6.05	3.74 (+0.8 m/s)	6.12 (+1.3 m/s)	6.12 m (+1.3 m/s)	q
4	Sofía Contreras	Chile	6.09 (+1.4 m/s)	5.80 (+0.5 m/s)	6.00 (+1.3 m/s)	6.09 m (+1.4 m/s)	q
5	Zhang Jiayi	China	x	5.61 (+0.5 m/s)	6.06 (+1.3 m/s)	6.06 m (+1.3 m/s)	
6	Siyana Brâmbarova	Bulgaria	x	6.04 (+2.2 m/s)	x	6.04 m (+2.2 m/s)	
6	Ema Bendová	Slovakia	6.04 (+1.1 m/s)	x	x	6.04 m (+1.1 m/s)	
8	Milica Stanimirović	Serbia	6.02 (+1.4 m/s)	x	5.95 (+2.2 m/s)	6.02 m (+1.4 m/s)	
9	Emina Omanović	Bosnia and Herzegovina	x	5.82 (+2.3 m/s)	6.00 (+1.0 m/s)	6.00 m (+1.0 m/s)	
10	Abigail Mecklenburg	United States	5.96 (+3.3 m/s)	5.79 (+1.1 m/s)	x	5.96 m (+3.3 m/s)	
11	Viola Canovi	Italy	5.61 (+ m/s)	x	5.92 (+0.6 m/s)	5.92 m (+0.6 m/s)	
12	Kristýna Záhořová	Czech Republic	x	5.89 (−1.0 m/s)	5.90 (+3.1 m/s)	5.90 m (+3.1 m/s)	
13	Oluchi Abelwe Ndubueze	South Africa	4.55 (+1.0 m/s)	x	5.76 (+2.6 m/s)	5.76 m (+2.6 m/s)	

=== Final ===
The final took place in the afternoon session on 6 August 2026.

Place	Athlete	Nation	Round						Mark	Notes
Place	Athlete	Nation	#1	#2	#3	#4	#5	#6	Mark	Notes
1st place, gold medalist(s)	Djelika Diarra	France	6.29 (+0.4 m/s)	x	6.52 (+0.6 m/s)	x	x	x	6.52 m (+0.6 m/s)	WU20L
2nd place, silver medalist(s)	Evelyn Mitropoulou	Greece	6.27 (+0.1 m/s)	6.44 (+0.5 m/s)	6.21 (−0.3 m/s)	x	5.99 (+0.3 m/s)	6.09 (+0.7 m/s)	6.44 m (+0.5 m/s)	
3rd place, bronze medalist(s)	Soudatou Niang	France	6.14 (+0.5 m/s)	6.34 (−0.4 m/s)	6.24 (−0.5 m/s)	6.31 (−0.1 m/s)	6.21 (±0.0 m/s)	6.06 (−0.1 m/s)	6.34 m (−0.4 m/s)	PB
4	Bori Rózsahegyi	Hungary	6.24 (+0.5 m/s)	6.08 (+0.2 m/s)	x	6.20 (+0.7 m/s)	6.22 (+1.0 m/s)	6.27 (−0.8 m/s)	6.27 m (−0.8 m/s)	
5	Ella Alvelin Malm	Sweden	x	6.14 (+0.8 m/s)	6.17 (+0.2 m/s)	6.02 (−0.1 m/s)	6.25 (+0.2 m/s)	x	6.25 m (+0.2 m/s)	
6	Daisy Snell	Great Britain	6.18 (+0.2 m/s)	6.18 (+0.7 m/s)	6.10 (+0.6 m/s)	x	6.22 (+0.7 m/s)	6.07 (+0.9 m/s)	6.22 m (+0.7 m/s)	
7	Sofía Contreras	Chile	6.04 (+0.4 m/s)	x	6.10 (−0.3 m/s)	6.20 (+0.5 m/s)	5.79 (−0.2 m/s)		6.20 m (+0.5 m/s)	
8	Guo Siyang	China	x	6.03 (−0.1 m/s)	5.94 (+0.6 m/s)	x	x		6.03 m (−0.1 m/s)	
9	Dominika Švaňová	Slovakia	4.67 (±0.0 m/s)	5.87 (+0.2 m/s)	5.85 (−0.1 m/s)	5.98 (+0.8 m/s)			5.98 m (+0.8 m/s)	
10	Ashlynn Norman	South Africa	5.92 (+0.5 m/s)	5.87 (+0.1 m/s)	5.96 (−0.6 m/s)	x			5.96 m (−0.6 m/s)	
11	Nevia Fotak	Croatia	5.59 (+0.4 m/s)	x	5.84 (±0.0 m/s)				5.84 m (±0.0 m/s)	
12	Viktória Molnár	Hungary	5.81 (−0.6 m/s)	x	x				5.81 m (−0.6 m/s)	
