= Madeline Cooper =

American hurdler (born 2007)

Personal information
- Born: June 4, 2007 (age 19)

Sport
- Sport: Athletics
- Event: Hurdles
Medal record
Women's athletics
Representing the United States
World U20 Championships
Gold medal – first place	2026 Eugene	100m hurdles

Madeline Cooper (born June 4, 2007) is an American high hurdler. She is the 2026 World U20 champion in the 100 metres hurdles.

== Biography ==
From Atlanta, she is a member of Saphire Track Club. In 2024, Cooper won the 100 metres hurdles at the USATF Junior Olympics in 13.33 seconds to became an age-group national champion for the first time. While a student at Drew Charter High School, she also set a school record and won the 100 metres dash in 11.62 seconds at the 2A State Championship that year.

In June 2026, Cooper ran 12.91 seconds to win the 100 metres hurdles title at the USATF U20 Championships. She equalled that U20 world-leading time when subsequently winning the gold medal at the 2026 World Athletics U20 Championships in Eugene in August, winning ahead of Tiana Marshall of Jamaica and Tumi Ramokgopa of South Africa.
