= Tumi Ramokgopa =

South African athlete (born 2007)

Boitumelo Ramokgopa
Personal information
- Nationality: South African
- Born: Boitumelo; 27 August 2007 (age 18)
- Height: 163 cm (5 ft 4 in)
- Weight: 68 kg (150 lb)

Sport
- Sport: Athletics
- Event: Hurdles

Achievements and titles
- Personal bests: 100m hurdles: 13.15 (2025); 400m hurdles: 55.90 (2025)
Medal record
Women's athletics
Representing South Africa
World U20 Championships
Silver medal – second place	2026 Eugene	100m hurdles
Silver medal – second place	2026 Eugene	400m hurdles
African U20 Championships
Gold medal – first place	2025 Abeokuta	100m hurdles
Gold medal – first place	2025 Abeokuta	400m hurdles
Commonwealth Youth Games
Bronze medal – third place	2023 Port of Spain	100 m hurdles
Bronze medal – third place	2023 Port of Spain	400 m hurdles

Boitumelo "Tumi" Ramokgopa (born 27 August 2007) is a South African track and field athlete who competes as a hurdler. She won silver medals at the 2026 World Athletics U20 Championships in both the 100 m hurdles and 400 m hurdles having won both events at the 2025 African U20 Championships.

== Early life ==
From Kempton Park, South Africa, she was schooled at Prestige College Hammanskraal.

== Career ==
She is a member of Athletics Gauteng North. In March 2023, she won gold in the 100m hurdles and 400m hurdles at the South African U18 Championships. She also won the African U18 Championships 400m hurdles and 100m hurdles titles. She won a pair of bronze medals in the 400m and 100m hurdles at the Commonwealth Youth Games in Trinidad and Tobago.

In March 2024, she won South African U18 titles in 100m hurdles and 400m hurdles. In April 2024, she won the ASA Grand Prix in Pretoria in 57.84 seconds. That month, she finished third at the senior South African National Championships 400m hurdles in Pietermaritzburg in a time of 57.04 seconds, aged 16 years-old, to set a new South African U18 record.

She finished sixth in the 400m hurdles at the African Championships in Douala, Cameroon in June 2024. She competed for South Africa at the World Athletics U20 Championships in Lima, Peru in August 2020, reaching the semi-finals.

As a seventeen year-old in March 2025, Ramokgopa broke the South African national junior record in the 100m hurdles at the UJ Stadium in Johannesburg, with a time of 13.22 seconds, surpassing the previous U20 record of 13.35 set by Taylon Bieldt in 2016. At the 2025 South African senior championships in Potchefstroom, she won the senior national title ahead of Chane Kok in the 100 m hurdles and was second in the 400 m hurdles to national champion Zeney Geldenhuys, running 55.90 for second to dip under 56 seconds for the first time. That year, she also won the South African U20 championships in both the 100m hurdles and 400m hurdles.

She also won the 2025 African Championships in both the 100m hurdles and 400m hurdles in Abeokuta, Nigeria, setting championship record times in both disciplines. In September 2025, she lowered the national u20 record to 13.15 seconds for the 100 m hurdles.

In April 2026, she placed third in the senior 400 m hurdles at the 2026 South African Championships, running 57.49 seconds. She also placed second in the women's 100m hurdles at the South African Championships in 13.13 seconds behind Marione Fourie. She represented South Africa at the 2026 World Athletics U20 Championships, winning the silver medal in the women's 100m hurdles final in Eugene behind Madeline Cooper of the United States. Later at the championships, she also won the silver medal in the final of the 400 metres hurdles.
