= Jan-Hendrik Heymans =

South African javelin thrower

Personal information
- Born: 2 August 2007 (age 19)

Sport
- Sport: Athletics
- Event: Javelin throw
Medal record
Men's athletics
Representing South Africa
World U20 Championships
Gold medal – first place	2026 Eugene	Javelin

Jan-Hendrik Heymans (born 2 August 2007) is a South African javelin thrower. He won the gold medal at the 2026 World Athletics U20 Championships.

== Biography ==
Educated at Helpmekaar Kollege in Johannesburg, he started as a cricketer before transitioning to athletics and the javelin throw after the suggestion was made following his accuracy in throwing the cricket ball from the boundary to the stumps. He later studied at North-West University.

In 2026, he threw a personal best 77.14 metres to win the South African U20 javelin title. Heymans won the gold medal at the 2026 World Athletics U20 Championships on 7 August 2026 in Eugene, United States, with a throw of 80.50 metres, a margin of victory of over six metres. He would have won the competition with any six of his throws on the day. He had previously qualified for the final having won his section with a 76.02m throw.
