= Djelika Diarra =

French long jumper (born 2007)

Personal information
- Nationality: French
- Born: 13 June 2007 (age 19)

Sport
- Sport: Athletics
- Event: Long jump
Medal record
Women's athletics
Representing France
World U20 Championships
Gold medal – first place	2026 Eugene	Long jump

Djelika Diarra (born 13 June 2007) is a French athlete who specializes in long jump. She won a gold medal in long jump at the 2026 World Athletics U20 Championships.

== Career ==
A member of AFA Feyzin-Vénissieux, and from Lyon, Diarra was runner-up at the French under-20 championships in 2026.

In August 2026, Diarra competed at the 2026 World Athletics U20 Championships and won a gold medal in the long jump with a personal best jump of 6.52 metres. She won the title ahead of silver medalist Evelyn Mitropoulou of Greece, and compatriot Soudatou Niang winning bronze. With their performances, Diarra and Niang echoed the results from the World Championships in 2016, when Yanis David won the long jump title, with countrywoman Hilary Kpatcha winning the bronze.
