= 2026 World Athletics U20 Championships – Women's hammer throw =

Women's hammer throw at the 2026 World Athletics U20 Championships
- Venue: Hayward Field
- Dates: 7 August (Qualification); 9 August (Final)
- Competitors: 22 from 18 nations
- Winning distance: 68.99 m

Medalists
gold medal	Clara Hegemann	Germany
silver medal	Pinja Kärhä	Finland
bronze medal	Nova Kienast	Germany

The women's hammer throw at the 2026 World Athletics U20 Championships was held at Hayward Field in Eugene, United States on 7 and 9 August 2026.

== Records ==
U20 standing records prior to the 2026 World Athletics U20 Championships were as follows:

Record	Athlete & Nationality	Mark	Location	Date
World U20 Record	Zhang Jiale (CHN)	74.40 m	Quzhou, China	2 August 2025
Championship Record	Silja Kosonen (FIN)	71.64 m	Nairobi, Kenya	21 August 2021
World U20 Leading	Pinja Kärhä (FIN)	70.73 m	Lahti, Finland	10 June 2026

== Results ==
=== Qualification ===
Qualification took place in the morning session on 7 August 2026.

==== Group A ====
Place	Athlete	Nation	Round			Mark	Notes
Place	Athlete	Nation	#1	#2	#3	Mark	Notes
1	Pinja Kärhä	Finland	67.51			67.51 m	Q
2	Nova Kienast	Germany	60.52	63.02	64.75	64.75 m	Q
3	Manon Beernaert	Belgium	57.45	x	63.06	63.06 m	q
4	Chen Jiajun	China	62.66	61.96	61.85	62.66 m	q
5	Alexandra Chernova	Greece	x	62.41	61.10	62.41 m	q
6	Meagan Ewers	United States	60.27	59.73	x	60.27 m	q
7	Aixa Corbacho	Spain	56.25	56.06	57.60	57.60 m	
8	Sarah Ettrup Larsen	Denmark	52.60	x	55.24	55.24 m	
9	Beatrice Lindberg	Sweden	x	x	52.38	52.38 m	
10	Chae-min Yang	South Korea	52.33	x	51.87	52.33 m	
	Denisse Medina	Ecuador	x	x	x	NM	

==== Group B ====
Place	Athlete	Nation	Round			Mark	Notes
Place	Athlete	Nation	#1	#2	#3	Mark	Notes
1	Burklie Burton	United States	68.03			68.03 m	
2	Clara Hegemann	Germany	66.68			66.68 m	
3	Polina Dzerozhynska	Ukraine	64.39			64.39 m	
4	Erica Lejon	Sweden	57.71	61.10	x	61.10 m	
5	Mirabella Emese Keserű	Hungary	x	47.42	59.77	59.77 m	
6	Kimberly Cristina de Souza	Brazil	56.24	59.31	59.05	59.31 m	
7	Salma Haitham Rashed Saeed Almarri	United Arab Emirates	58.96	57.35	x	58.96 m	NR
8	Xiao Shifan	China	x	58.12	58.86	58.86 m	
9	Carmela Cocco	Argentina	57.79	55.08	x	57.79 m	
10	Anthi Apostolidou	Cyprus	54.76	55.19	x	55.19 m	
11	Maria Pracharczyk	Poland	51.55	49.50	54.08	54.08 m	

=== Final ===
The final took place in the afternoon session on 9 August 2026.

Place	Athlete	Nation	Round						Mark	Notes
Place	Athlete	Nation	#1	#2	#3	#4	#5	#6	Mark	Notes
1st place, gold medalist(s)	Clara Hegemann	Germany	67.65	x	66.97	68.99	x	x	68.99 m	
2nd place, silver medalist(s)	Pinja Kärhä	Finland	67.51	68.51	67.73	66.22	x	66.33	68.51 m	
3rd place, bronze medalist(s)	Nova Kienast	Germany	64.34	66.49	64.84	65.74	67.89	66.15	67.89 m	SB
4	Burklie Burton	United States	61.77	66.25	63.52	66.21	67.50	x	67.50 m	
5	Polina Dzerozhynska	Ukraine	65.78	x	65.85	64.49	x	67.01	67.01 m	PB
6	Chen Jiajun	China	65.13	65.29	63.40	63.72	66.75	x	66.75	
7	Alexandra Chernova	Greece	64.00	x	65.39	63.07	x		65.39 m	
8	Erica Lejon	Sweden	60.12	61.33	61.90	60.77	62.60		62.60 m	
9	Manon Beernaert	Belgium	x	60.41	60.03	x			60.41 m	
10	Meagan Ewers	United States	59.80	x	58.96	57.48			59.80 m	
11	Kimberly Cristina de Souza	Brazil	x	58.99	x				58.99 m	
12	Mirabella Emese Keserű	Hungary	56.77	x	x				56.77 m	
