= Anastazja Kuś =

Polish athlete (born 2007)

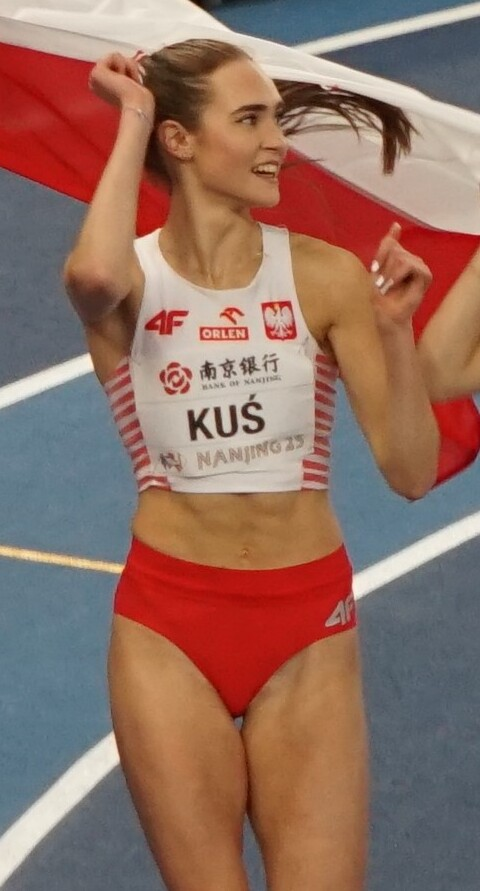
- Anastazja Kuś in 2025

Personal information
- Nationality: Polish
- Born: 11 May 2007 (age 19)
- Height: 174 cm (5 ft 9 in)
- Weight: 60 kg (132 lb)

Sport
- Sport: Athletics
- Event: Sprint

Achievements and titles
- Personal bests: 400m (Outdoor): 51.06 (Eugene, 2026) NU20R; 400m (Indoor): 52.50 (Toruń, 2026)
Medal record
Women's athletics
Representing Poland
World Indoor Championships
Silver medal – second place	2025 Nanjing	4x400 m relay
World U20 Championships
Gold medal – first place	2026 Eugene	400 m
European U20 Championships
Bronze medal – third place	2025 Tampere	400 m
European U18 Championships
Gold medal – first place	2024 Banská Bystrica	400 m
Silver medal – second place	2024 Banská Bystrica	Medley relay
European Youth Olympic Festival
Gold medal – first place	2023 Maribor	400 m
Silver medal – second place	2022 Banská Bystrica	Medley relay

Anastazja Kuś (born 11 May 2007) is a Polish sprinter. The 2026 World under-20 champion in the 400 metres, she set a new the Polish under-20 national record in winning the title. She competed for Poland at the 2024 Olympic Games and was a silver medalist at the 2025 World Indoor Championships in the women's 4x400 m relay.

== Early life ==
She spent part of her childhood in Istanbul, where her father, professional footballer Marcin Kuś, was playing at the time. She took part in gymnastics and tennis in her youth before focusing on athletics.

== Career ==
She broke her personal bests in the 100, 200 and 400 metres in 2023, winning the Polish under-18 title over 400 metres. Her personal records currently stand at 38.39s (300m), 23.51s (200m) and 12.11s over the 100m (last run in 2023). She won a gold medal at the 2023 European Youth Olympic Festival (EYOF) in Maribor in 2023. She competed at the 2023 European U20 Championships in Jerusalem.

She is a member of AZS UWM Olsztyn and was part of their club relay team that won the gold medal at the Polish Senior Indoor Championships in the 4 × 400 meters in February 2024. Later that year, racing in Toruń, she broke the U18 national record, running 54.15 seconds. She lowered it further to 52.26 seconds at the Polish Outdoor Championships in Bydgoszcz in June 2024, and in the final she placed sixth overall. In July 2024, she won the Polish U18 Championships with a time of 52.68 seconds in Lublin.

She ran a personal best, national under-18 record and championship record of 51.89 for the 400 metres to win gold at the 2024 European U18 Championships in Banská Bystrica, Slovakia on 20 July 2024.

She competed in the women's 4 × 400 metres relay at the 2024 Paris Olympics. She was selected for the 4 × 400 metres relay team for the 2025 World Indoor Championships in Nanjing in March 2025. In July 2025, she won the 400 metres at the Polish U20 Championships in Wloclawek in a time of 52.01 seconds. The following month, she won the bronze medal over 400 metres at the 2025 European Athletics U20 Championships in Tampere, Finland. She also anchored the Polish women's 4 × 400 m relay team, running a split of 51.80 seconds. She was selected for the Polish team for the 2025 World Athletics Championships in Tokyo, Japan.

Kuś ran an indoor personal best of 52.50 seconds as she placed fourth over 400 metres at the 2026 Polish Indoor Championship in Toruń. She was selected for the relay pool at the 2026 World Athletics Indoor Championships in March 2026 in Poland, running as part of the women's 4 x 400 metres relay team which placed fourth overall. She was selected to represent Poland over the 400m individual event at the U-20 World Athletics Championships in Oregon, USA. In the final of the 400 metres at the Championships, she won the gold medal ahead of Tianna Springer of Guyana and Ataja Stephane-Vazquez of the United States, running a Polish under-20 national record of 51.06 seconds. In August, she also competed at the 2026 European Athletics Championships in Birmingham, England, in the women's 4 x 400 metres relay. She was nominated for European Athletics Women’s Rising Star for 2026.

== Personal life ==
Kuś is a keen pianist. She was enrolled in Szkola w Chmurze (an online school for homeschoolers). In February 2025, she was announced as the subject of the documentary series On Fire, produced by European Athletics.
