= 2026 World Athletics U20 Championships – Men's 1500 metres =

Men's 1500 metres at the 2026 World Athletics U20 Championships
- Venue: Hayward Field
- Dates: 6 August (Round 1); 9 August (Final)
- Competitors: 35
- Winning time: 3:37.46 PB

Medalists
gold medal	Wilson Chepkwech	Kenya
silver medal	David Kapaiko Sekento	Kenya
bronze medal	Osama Er Redouani	Morocco

The men's 1500 metres at the 2026 World Athletics U20 Championships was held at Hayward Field in Eugene, United States on 6 and 9 August 2026.

== Records ==
U20 standing records prior to the 2026 World Athletics U20 Championships were as follows:

Record	Athlete & Nationality	Mark	Location	Date
World U20 Record	Phanuel Koech (KEN)	3:27.72	Paris, France	20 June 2025
Championship Record	Abdelaati Iguider (MAR)	3:35.53	Grosseto, Italy	15 July 2004
World U20 Leading	Muhdin Werku (ETH)	3:32.71	Zagreb, Croatia	26 June 2026

== Results ==
=== Round 1 ===
Round 1 took place in the afternoon session on 6 August 2026. The first 5 in each heat (Q) advanced to the final.

==== Heat 1 ====
Place	Athlete	Nation	Time	Notes
1	Osama Er Redouani	Morocco	3:42.23	Q, PB
2	James Alexander	Great Britain	3:42.55	Q
3	Kieran Shepherd	Australia	3:42.94	Q, PB
4	Destaw Tade	Ethiopia	3:43.03	Q
5	Alessandro Casoni	Italy	3:43.05	Q
6	Pol Molins	Spain	3:43.06	
7	George Wyllie	New Zealand	3:43.15	PB
8	Piet Hoyer	Germany	3:45.20	
9	Árpád Gondos	Hungary	3:48.93	
10	Daniel Kiprotich Chelogoi	Uganda	3:49.53	
11	Bertus van der Linde	South Africa	3:57.02	

==== Heat 2 ====
Place	Athlete	Nation	Time	Notes
1	David Kapaiko Sekento	Kenya	3:43.60	Q
2	Aldin Ćatović	Serbia	3:44.55	Q
3	Mohammed Elmoussalit	Morocco	3:45.28	Q
4	Filip Toul	Czech Republic	3:45.39	Q
5	Tiisetso Malungane	South Africa	3:45.64	Q
6	Nate Stadtlander	United States	3:45.65	
7	Chase Capes	Canada	3:46.77	
8	Luca Cavazzuti	Italy	3:47.38	
9	Finn Jakob Merheim	Germany	3:50.30	
10	Aron Mathisen Askim	Norway	3:51.42	
11	Duarte Vilas Boas	Portugal	3:51.54	
12	Hugo Witteveen	Switzerland	3:51.62	

==== Heat 3 ====
Place	Athlete	Nation	Time	Notes
1	Wilson Chepkwech	Kenya	3:45.43	Q
2	Honda Ojiro	Japan	3:46.85	Q
3	Henry Dixon	United States	3:47.26	Q
4	Tzu-Chieh Chien	Chinese Taipei	3:47.32	Q
5	Karim Fartaz	Spain	3:47.43	Q
6	Ethan Newell	Great Britain	3:47.74	
7	Eric Huanca Quispe	Switzerland	3:48.75	
8	Alexander Cameron-Smith	Australia	3:51.37	
9	Younes Ghalem	Algeria	3:53.51	
10	Love Nilsson	Sweden	3:54.02	
11	Pablo Antonio Ñauta	Ecuador	3:57.79	
12	Hamish Murray	New Zealand	4:00.35	

=== Final ===
The final took place in the afternoon session on 9 August 2026.

Place	Athlete	Nation	Time	Notes
1st place, gold medalist(s)	Wilson Chepkwech	Kenya	3:37.46	PB
2nd place, silver medalist(s)	David Kapaiko Sekento	Kenya	3:38.32	PB
3rd place, bronze medalist(s)	Osama Er Redouani	Morocco	3:39.68	PB
4	Mohammed Elmoussalit	Morocco	3:41.09	
5	Aldin Ćatović	Serbia	3:41.56	SB
6	Filip Toul	Czech Republic	3:41.57	
7	Tzu-Chieh Chien	Chinese Taipei	3:42.07	NU20R
8	Kieran Shepherd	Australia	3:42.25	PB
9	Tiisetso Malungane	South Africa	3:42.98	
10	Alessandro Casoni	Italy	3:43.59	
11	James Alexander	Great Britain	3:46.26	
12	Destaw Tade	Ethiopia	3:46.46	
13	Karim Fartaz	Spain	3:47.75	
14	Honda Ojiro	Japan	3:51.59	
15	Henry Dixon	United States	3:51.99	
