= Wilson Chepkwech =

Kenyan athlete (born 2009)

Personal information
- Nationality: Kenyan
- Born: 28 August 2009 (age 16)

Sport
- Sport: Athletics
- Event: Middle-distance running
Medal record
Men's athletics
Representing Kenya
World U20 Championships
Gold medal – first place	2026 Eugene	1500 m

Wilson Chepkwech (born 28 August 2009) is a Kenyan middle-distance runner. He won a gold medal in the 1500 metres at the 2026 World Athletics U20 Championships.

== Career ==
In August 2026, Chepkwech competed at the 2026 World Athletics U20 Championships in the 1500 metres. During the third heat he had the fastest time of 3:45.43 to advance to the finals. During the finals he won a gold medal with a personal best time of 3:37.46.
