= Isaiah Whitaker =

American pole vaulter (born 2007)

Personal information
- Born: 4 December 2007 (age 18)

Sport
- Sport: Athletics
- Event: Pole vault
Medal record
Men's athletics
Representing United States
World U20 Championships
Bronze medal – third place	2026 Eugene	Pole vault

Isaiah Whitaker (born 4 December 2007) is an American pole vaulter.

== Biography ==
From Illinois, he attended Central Catholic High School in Bloomington. He started in pole vault having seen his brother Isaac compete, and showed aptitude for the discipline at a young age; While competing at the AAU Junior Olympics at Greensboro, North Carolina in August 2022, Whitaker set an age-14 world best for the pole vault, clearing the bar at 16 feet, 2 inches.

Having overcome a shoulder injury at the start of the year, Whitaker placed second in the pole vault competition behind Jaxon Jerabek at the USATF U20 Championships in June 2026, having cleared 5.47 metres, before going on that month to win the Nike Outdoor Championships. He was subsequently named the 2025 - 2026 Gatorade Player of the Year in Illinois for Boys Track and Field. That year, he committed to the University of Kentucky.

Competing at the 2026 World Athletics U20 Championships in Eugene, he was a finalist in the pole vault competition. Although he initially placed fourth in the final, a late disqualification for the third-place finisher, compatriot Jerabek, led Whitaker to be promoted into the bronze medal position, with a clearance of 5.45 metres.
