= Nicole Krutilová =

Czech pole vaulter (born 2007)

Personal information
- Born: 10 February 2007 (age 19)

Sport
- Sport: Athletics
- Event: Pole vault

Achievements and titles
- Personal best: Pole vault: 4.52m (2026) NU20R
Medal record
Women's athletics
Representing Czech Republic
World U20 Championships
Gold medal – first place	2026 Eugene	Pole vault

Nicole Krutilová (born 10 February 2007) is a Czech pole vaulter. She won the gold medal at the 2026 World Athletics U20 Championships.

== Biography ==
Krutilová placed seventh overall in the pole vault at the 2024 World Athletics U20 Championships in Lima, Peru and fourth at the 2024 European Athletics U18 Championships in Slovakia.

Krutilová won the Czech Athletics Championships in 2026 and became the national under-20 record holder with a clearance of 4.52 metres. On 8 August, she won the gold medal at the 2026 World Athletics U20 Championships in Eugene, United States with a clearance of 4.45 metres. Despite her good form in the season and a one-jump clearance in the preliminary round to reach the final, she conceded after the title was won that she almost did not compete at the championships due to ill health.
