= 2026 World Athletics U20 Championships – Men's javelin throw =

Men's javelin throw at the 2026 World Athletics U20 Championships
- Venue: Hayward Field
- Dates: 5 August (Qualification); 7 August (Final)
- Competitors: 26 from 19 nations
- Winning distance: 80.50 m

Medalists
gold medal	Jan-Hendrik Heymans	South Africa
silver medal	Ashish Yadav	India
bronze medal	Addison James	Dominica

The men's javelin throw at the 2026 World Athletics U20 Championships was held at Hayward Field in Eugene, United States on 5 and 7 August 2026.

== Records ==
U20 standing records prior to the 2026 World Athletics U20 Championships were as follows:

Record	Athlete & Nationality	Mark	Location	Date
World U20 Record	Neeraj Chopra (IND)	86.48 m	Bydgoszcz, Poland	23 July 2016
Championship Record	Neeraj Chopra (IND)	86.48 m	Bydgoszcz, Poland	23 July 2016
World U20 Leading	Jan-Hendrik Heymans (RSA)	77.14 m	Johannesburg, South Africa	27 March 2026

== Results ==
=== Qualification ===
Qualification took place in the afternoon session on 5 August 2026. Athletes attaining a mark of at least 72.50 metres (Q) or at least the 12 best performers (q) will qualify for the final.

==== Group A ====
Place	Athlete	Nation	Round			Mark	Notes
Place	Athlete	Nation	#1	#2	#3	Mark	Notes
1	Ashish Yadav	India	69.87	68.43	68.07	69.87 m	q
2	Aleksander Wojna	Poland	65.94	69.80	x	69.80 m	q
3	Marques Olivier	South Africa	68.50	68.76	65.08	68.76 m	q
4	Pietro Villa	Italy	65.18	68.72	x	68.72 m	q
5	Hung Yu-kun	Chinese Taipei	64.33	68.45	x	68.45 m	q, SB
6	Leon Iwasaka	Japan	x	66.54	68.31	68.31 m	q
7	Branko Pokrajac	Serbia	67.40	68.13	67.14	68.13 m	q
8	Charlie Mason	Great Britain	60.89	66.33	67.77	67.77 m	
9	Taha Hassan	Egypt	64.14	67.12	66.59	67.12 m	
10	Mogens Braun	Germany	63.53	66.35	x	66.35 m	
11	Nolan Carey	United States	64.07	x	61.12	64.07 m	
12	Themiya Bimsara Thabrew Nammuni	Sri Lanka	x	62.67	63.23	63.23 m	
	Szabolcs Tamás Magyar	Hungary	x	–	–	NM	

==== Group B ====
Place	Athlete	Nation	Round			Mark	Notes
Place	Athlete	Nation	#1	#2	#3	Mark	Notes
1	Jan-Hendrik Heymans	South Africa	76.02			76.02 m	Q
2	Yang Zhaoyi	China	x	69.43	x	69.43 m	q
3	Addison James	Dominica	68.87	x	65.49	68.87 m	q
4	Mohamed Osama Hassan	Egypt	64.68	64.70	68.13	68.13 m	q
5	T. Dharanidharan	India	63.81	68.07	67.37	68.07 m	q
6	Niklas Könnemann	Germany	64.44	60.72	66.94	66.94 m	
7	Jakov Pijaca	Croatia	62.96	62.17	60.13	62.96 m	
8	Luka Zarnik	Slovenia	62.48	58.59	61.06	62.48 m	
9	Tom Rutter	Great Britain	61.81	x	x	61.81 m	
10	Olivér Menyhárt	Hungary	x	59.14	61.66	61.66 m	
11	Leonardo di Mugno	Italy	59.86	57.45	56.83	59.86 m	
12	Pedro Henrique da Silva	Brazil	57.81	59.73	x	59.73 m	
	Jang Ha-jin	South Korea	x	x	–	NM	

=== Final ===
The final took place in the afternoon session on 7 August 2026.

Place	Athlete	Nation	Round						Mark	Notes
Place	Athlete	Nation	#1	#2	#3	#4	#5	#6	Mark	Notes
1st place, gold medalist(s)	Jan-Hendrik Heymans	South Africa	76.92	76.40	76.74	76.46	79.42	80.50	80.50 m	WU20L
2nd place, silver medalist(s)	Ashish Yadav	India	69.96	x	74.09	72.31	70.62	67.98	74.09 m	
3rd place, bronze medalist(s)	Addison James	Dominica	68.63	73.89	x	69.56	66.05	70.22	73.89 m	NU20R
4	Mohamed Osama Hassan	Egypt	73.77	70.55	68.60	70.01	x	x	73.77 m	PB
5	Yang Zhaoyi	China	x	68.88	68.45	72.86	72.54	71.96	72.86 m	SB
6	T. Dharanidharan	India	70.53	71.22	63.13	68.80	72.35	71.61	72.35 m	
7	Marques Olivier	South Africa	67.96	70.94	66.27	63.47	66.36		70.94 m	
8	Aleksander Wojna	Poland	x	68.94	x	x	x		68.94 m	
9	Leon Iwasaka	Japan	x	66.47	66.75	65.56			66.75 m	
10	Hung Yu-kun	Chinese Taipei	65.21	66.70	63.36	63.80			66.70 m	
11	Pietro Villa	Italy	63.84	65.97	66.65				66.65 m	
12	Branko Pokrajac	Serbia	60.07	63.39	62.74				63.39 m	
