= Jaslene Massey =

American athlete (born 2007)

Personal information
- Born: 15 December 2007 (age 18)

Sport
- Sport: Athletics
- Events: Discus throw, Shot put
Medal record
Women's athletics
Representing United States
World U20 Championships
| Silver medal – second place | 2026 Eugene | Discus |

Jaslene Massey (born 15 December 2007) is an American discus thrower and shot putter.

== Biography ==
Massey competed in figure skating and volleyball before focusing on athletics. In her senior year at Aliso Niguel High School in California, she won state discus and shot put titles, not only breaking the state record in the discus throw but also making was the farthest throw ever by a girl in a U.S. high school meet and second on the national all-time list behind Shelbi Vaughan who had only bettered Massey's mark in a post-high school summer meet. That June, Massey won both titles at the Nike Outdoor Nationals and again at the USATF U20 Outdoor Championships, setting personal bests in three of the four finals. That year, she also won the Nike Indoor Nationals in the shot put.

She was selected to represent the United States at the 2026 World Athletics U20 Championships in Eugene and qualified for the final of both shot put and discus, with both events concluding on the same evening on 6 August. From the conclusion of the discus competition she only had nine minutes to warm-up for the shot put final. She won the silver medal in the discus throw with 58.41 metres, finishing behind Su Yixin of China, before staying on the field for the shot put final in which she placed eighth overall.

== Personal life ==
From Orange County, California, outside athletics she got a realtor license in February 2026 soon after turning 18 years-old. She also took an internship as a data analyst for sports and entertainment media company in 2026 prior to starting at the University of Oregon.
