= 2026 World Athletics U20 Championships – Women's discus throw =

Women's discus throw at the 2026 World Athletics U20 Championships
- Venue: Hayward Field
- Dates: 5 August (Qualification); 6 August (Final)
- Competitors: 25 from 19 nations
- Winning distance: 61.06 m

Medalists
gold medal	Su Yixin	China
silver medal	Jaslene Massey	United States
bronze medal	Marina Hadjicosta	Cyprus

The women's discus throw at the 2026 World Athletics U20 Championships was held at Hayward Field in Eugene, United States on 5 and 6 August 2026.

== Records ==
U20 standing records prior to the 2026 World Athletics U20 Championships were as follows:

Record	Athlete & Nationality	Mark	Location	Date
World U20 Record	Ilke Wyludda (GDR)	74.40 m	East Berlin, East Germany	13 September 1988
Championship Record	Ilke Wyludda (GDR)	68.24 m	Sudbury, Canada	31 July 1988
World U20 Leading	Jaslene Massey (USA)	60.27 m	Neubrandenburg, Germany	22 May 2024

== Results ==
=== Qualification ===
Qualification took place in the morning session on 5 August 2026. Athletes attaining a mark of at least 55.00 metres (Q) or at least the 12 best performers (q) qualified for the final.

==== Group A ====
Place	Athlete	Nation	Round			Mark	Notes
Place	Athlete	Nation	#1	#2	#3	Mark	Notes
1	Ma Chenyi	China	57.72			57.72 m	Q, SB
2	Favour Adesokan	Germany	56.14			56.14 m	Q
3	Jaslene Massey	United States	55.47			55.47 m	Q
4	Able Deborah Mills	Jamaica	53.37	x	52.38	53.37 m	q
5	Karmen-Elizabeth Maritz	New Zealand	x	52.88	x	52.88 m	q
6	Amanat Kamboj	India	50.49	49.20	52.58	52.58 m	q, SB
7	Koko Konda	Japan	47.08	51.53	51.19	51.53 m	
8	Kendra Silvery Duany	Mexico	45.26	51.10	x	51.10 m	PB
9	Mila Ueckermann	South Africa	x	50.50	x	50.50 m	
10	Chelsy Wayne	Australia	47.07	47.78	49.96	49.96 m	
11	Jenna Tunks	Canada	47.36	48.07	46.82	48.07 m	
12	Katarina Verst	Estonia	x	46.47	x	46.47 m	
13	Martina Burčer	Serbia	x	45.18	x	45.18 m	

==== Group B ====
Place	Athlete	Nation	Round			Mark	Notes
Place	Athlete	Nation	#1	#2	#3	Mark	Notes
1	Su Yixin	China	58.06			58.06 m	Q
2	Jillian Scully	United States	54.15	51.80	x	54.15 m	q
3	Marina Hadjicosta	Cyprus	48.33	48.10	53.84	53.84 m	q
4	Andrea Njimi Tankeu Djeudji	Spain	53.03	x	x	53.03 m	q
5	Emma le Blansch	Netherlands	51.48	52.98	52.55	52.98 m	q
6	Vasiliki Samolada	Greece	x	x	52.76	52.76 m	q, PB
7	Anna-Maria Weber	Germany	50.10	49.39	51.09	51.09 m	
8	Chris-Mari Nel	South Africa	x	x	50.98	50.98 m	PB
9	Mirabella Emese Keserű	Hungary	49.04	x	x	49.04 m	
10	Kate Hallie	New Zealand	42.77	x	48.88	48.88 m	
11	Iida Muukka	Finland	45.05	x	48.57	48.57 m	
12	Riley-Jay Henry-Purcell	Australia	x	48.26	46.43	48.26 m	

=== Final ===
The final took place in the afternoon session on 6 August 2026.

Place	Athlete	Nation	Round						Mark	Notes
Place	Athlete	Nation	#1	#2	#3	#4	#5	#6	Mark	Notes
1st place, gold medalist(s)	Su Yixin	China	59.32	57.12	58.64	x	59.22	61.06	61.06 m	WU20L
2nd place, silver medalist(s)	Jaslene Massey	United States	53.62	52.92	x	56.17	53.45	58.41	58.41 m	
3rd place, bronze medalist(s)	Marina Hadjicosta	Cyprus	53.99	53.96	51.88	54.88	x	x	54.88 m	
4	Ma Chenyi	China	54.58	51.77	x	x	53.30	x	54.58 m	
5	Favour Adesokan	Germany	53.97	x	x	x	53.27	53.00	53.97 m	
6	Amanat Kamboj	India	53.24	x	50.81	52.45	6.98	53.05	53.24 m	PB
7	Karmen-Elizabeth Maritz	New Zealand	50.67	x	47.76	52.47	x		52.47 m	
8	Emma le Blansch	Netherlands	51.91	51.23	50.83	50.75	x		51.91 m	
9	Andrea Njimi Tankeu Djeudji	Spain	51.06	x	x	x			51.06 m	
10	Vasiliki Samolada	Greece	50.12	50.11	x	50.45			50.45 m	
—	Jillian Scully	United States	x	x	x				NM	
—	Able Deborah Mills	Jamaica	x	x	x				NM	
