= Athletics at the 2026 Summer Youth Olympics – Women's pole vault =

Athletics event at the 2026 Summer Youth Olympics

Women's pole vault at the IV Summer Youth Olympic Games
- Venue: Complexe Iba Mar Diop
- Date: 8 November
- Competitors: 7 from 7 nations

Medalists
| 1st place, gold medalist(s) | | Julie Bourgis | France |
| 2nd place, silver medalist(s) | | Csenge Zsuzsanna Zsombor | Hungary |
| 3rd place, bronze medalist(s) | | Lena Kaczkowska | Poland |
| 3rd place, bronze medalist(s) | | Kiyora Matsuura | Japan |

The women's pole vault event at the 2026 Summer Youth Olympics was held on 8 November at the Complexe Iba Mar Diop in Dakar, Senegal.

France's Julie Bourgis won the competition, clearing a height of 4.20 metres. Csenge Zsuzsanna Zsombor of Hungary finished second with 3.80 metres, while Lena Kaczkowska of Poland and Kiyora Matsuura of Japan shared the bronze medal after both cleared 3.60 metres.

== Schedule ==
All times are local (West Africa Time, UTC+0).

| Date | Time | Round |
|---|---|---|
| 8 November 2026 | 15:36 | Final |

== Results ==
=== Final ===
The final was held on 8 November 2026. The winner was determined by the greatest height cleared. Athletes with the same best height were ranked according to the countback procedure, taking into account the number of failures at the last height cleared and throughout the competition.

| Rank | Bib | Athlete | Nation | 3.00 | 3.30 | 3.60 | 3.80 | 3.95 | 4.10 | 4.20 | 4.25 | Result |
|---|---|---|---|---|---|---|---|---|---|---|---|---|
| 1st place, gold medalist(s) | 167 | Julie Bourgis | France | – | – | – | – | – | – | xo | xxx | 4.20 |
| 2nd place, silver medalist(s) | 181 | Csenge Zsuzsanna Zsombor | Hungary | – | o | o | o | xxx | | | | 3.80 |
| 3rd place, bronze medalist(s) | 235 | Lena Kaczkowska | Poland | – | – | o | xxx | | | | | 3.60 |
| 3rd place, bronze medalist(s) | 193 | Kiyora Matsuura | Japan | – | – | o | xxx | | | | | 3.60 |
| 5 | 174 | Lorena-Marina Chatzileleka | Greece | – | – | xo | xxx | | | | | 3.60 |
| | 156 | Alba Benito | Spain | – | – | xxx | | | | | | NM |
| | 149 | Hanin Elshebokshi | Egypt | xxx | | | | | | | | NM |

The symbols used in the table indicate valid attempts (o), failed attempts (x), and passed heights (–). NM denotes no mark.
