= Frankline Kibet =

Kenyan long-distance runner

Personal information
- Full name: Frankline Kibet Chebet
- Born: 28 July 2007 (age 19)

Sport
- Sport: Athletics
- Events: Long-distance running, Cross country running

Achievements and titles
- Personal bests: 5000m: 13:08.32 (Paris, 2026); 5km (road): 13:45 (Tokyo, 2025)
Medal record
Men's athletics
Representing Kenya
World U20 Championships
Gold medal – first place	2026 Eugene	5000 m
World Cross Country Championships
Gold medal – first place	2026 Tallahassee	U20 team
Gold medal – first place	2026 Tallahassee	U20 race

Frankline Kibet Chebet (born 28 July 2007) is a Kenyan long-distance and cross country runner. He won the U20 race at the 2026 World Athletics Cross Country Championships.

== Biography ==
Kibet placed second in the junior race at the Kenyan Cross Country Championships in February 2025. Later that year, he was runner-up in the 5000m at the Kenyan trials for the African U20 Championships. In May 2025, Kibet placed sixth in the 5000 metres at the Kip Keino Classic in Nairobi in 13:45.42.

In October 2025, he was runner-up to Emmanuel Kiprono at the Kenyan jumior cross country championships. He was subsequently selected for the U20 race at the 2026 World Athletics Cross Country Championships in Tallahassee, where he won the men's under-20 race ahead of Kiprono, with Kenya also winning the team gold medal. In February 2026, he won the U20 men's race for Sporting Clube de Portugal, winning by 41 seconds from Spain's Guillem Sans at the ECCC Cross Country in Albufeira, Portugal.

In April 2026, Kibet was runner-up in the 5000m behind compatriot Cornelius Kemboi at the Kip Keino Classic in Nairobi. Kibet ran a personal best 13:08.32 for the 5000 metres on 28 June at the 2026 Meeting de Paris. He won the gold medal in the 5000 metres at the 2026 World Athletics U20 Championships. In November, he placed third at the Cross Internacional de Itálica in Seville.
