= Ashtyn Lewis =

American sprinter (born 2008)

Personal information
- Nationality: American
- Born: January 5, 2008 (age 18)

Sport
- Sport: Athletics
- Event: Sprints
Medal record
Women's athletics
Representing the United States
World U20 Championships
Gold medal – first place	2026 Eugene	4×400 m

Ashtyn Lewis (born January 5, 2008) is an American sprinter.

== Early life and education ==
Lewis attended Iowa Colony High School and is committed to run track and field at Vanderbilt University. She won the 2026 UIL State Track and Field Championships in the 400 meters with a time of 52.81 seconds. She also won silver in the 200 meter dash with a time of 23.19 seconds, a race she almost withdrew from due to her health. She also won a silver medal in the 4×100 meter relay with a time of 45.82.

== Career ==
In August 2026, Lewis competed at the 2026 World Athletics U20 Championships and was part of the American quartet that won a gold medal in the 4 × 400 metres relay with a time of 3:29.15.
