= Olivia Harris (sprinter) =

American sprinter (born 2009)

Personal information
- Born: November 5, 2008 (age 17)

Sport
- Sport: Athletics
- Event: Sprint
Medal record
Women's athletics
Representing United States
World U20 Championships
Gold medal – first place	2024 Lima	4×400 m relay
Gold medal – first place	2026 Eugene	4×400 m relay
Gold medal – first place	2026 Eugene	4×400 m mixed

Olivia Harris (born November 5, 2008) is an American sprinter. She is a three-time gold medalist at the World Athletics U20 Championships.

== Biography ==
Harris was educated at Buford High School in Buford, Georgia. She ran 52.16 seconds for the 400 metres on February 15, 2026, with the time putting Harris fourth in her age-group on the American all-time list for her age-group.

On August 5, 2026, she was part of the United States quartet that set a world under-20 record of 3:15.31 in the mixed 4 x 400 metres in winning the gold medal at the 2026 World Athletics U20 Championships in Eugene. The time was more than two seconds faster than the previous best set by the United States team at the event in 2022. Later at the championships, she also won the gold medal in the final of the women's 4 x 400 metres relay.
