= Athletics at the 2026 Summer Youth Olympics – Women's discus throw =

Athletics event at the 2026 Summer Youth Olympics

Women's discus throw at the IV Summer Youth Olympic Games
- Venue: Complexe Iba Mar Diop
- Date: 8 November
- Competitors: 8 from 8 nations

Medalists
1st place, gold medalist(s)		Marina Hadjicosta	Cyprus
2nd place, silver medalist(s)		Katr Ennada Jaoued	Tunisia
3rd place, bronze medalist(s)		Kendra Silvery Duany Neira	Mexico

The women's discus throw event at the 2026 Summer Youth Olympics was held at the Complexe Iba Mar Diop on 8 November 2026. The gold medal was won by Marina Hadjicosta of Cyprus with a throw of 53.20 metres. Katr Ennada Jaoued of Tunisia won the silver medal with 49.28 metres, while Kendra Silvery Duany Neira of Mexico took bronze with 48.44 metres.

== Schedule ==
All times are local (West Africa Time, UTC+0).

Date	Time	Round
8 November 2026	16:10	Final

== Results ==
=== Final ===
The final was held on 8 November 2026. Each athlete was allowed six attempts, with the best valid throw determining the final ranking.

Rank	Bib	Athlete	Nation	1	2	3	4	5	6	Result	Note
1	142	Marina Hadjicosta	Cyprus	48.17	x	x	x	53.20	x	53.20	
2	275	Katr Ennada Jaoued	Tunisia	48.26	49.28	41.93	x	49.24	x	49.28	PB
3	217	Kendra Silvery Duany Neira	Mexico	48.44	25.84	x	x	46.08	48.35	48.44	
4	246	Shiloh Snijders	South Africa	x	36.96	39.42	41.58	41.26	40.00	41.58	
5	139	Adriana González	Cuba	35.61	33.00	30.43	35.06	33.96	37.54	37.54	PB
6	194	Reisa Nagata	Japan	37.10	32.52	37.02	36.33	36.75	35.91	37.10	
7	278	Luisa Vila	Tuvalu	x	28.25	30.10	x	x	30.72	30.72	PB
8	294	Prudence Kauswa	Zimbabwe	29.91	29.24	30.02	28.05	27.73	28.56	30.02	PB

The symbol x indicates a failed attempt. Distances are measured in metres. PB denotes a personal best.
