= Axel Rogö =

Swedish pole vaulter (born 2007)

Personal information
- Born: 10 April 2007 (age 19)

Sport
- Sport: Athletics
- Event: Pole vault

Achievements and titles
- Personal best(s): Pole vault: 5.45 m (Tampere, 2025)
Medal record
Men's athletics
Representing Sweden
European U20 Championships
| Gold medal – first place | 2025 Tampere | Pole vault |

Axel Rogö (born 10 April 2007) is a Swedish pole vaulter. He won the 2025 European Athletics U20 Championships and placed third in the senior Swedish Athletics Championships both indoors and outdoors in 2024.

== Career ==
Rogö is from Billdal in Halland County, Sweden, and competes as a member of IFK Göteborg.

As a 16 year-old, he competed at the Swedish Indoor Athletics Championships with a personal best in the pole vault of five metres, but he went on to surpass that height several times during the competition and came away with a third place finish. When he cleared 5.12 metres he moved to number one on the world best list for U18 athletes, and into the Swedish U20 top ten all-time list. When he cleared 5.17 on his first attempt he secured a medal in the competition, and finished third with 5.22 metres. Rogö placed third at the Swedish Athletics Championships in a June 2024, and fourth in the pole vault the following month at the 2024 European Athletics U18 Championships in Banská Bystrica, Slovakia.

Rogö won the pole vault at the 2025 European Athletics U20 Championships in Tampere, Finland in August 2025, winning ahead of Zackaria Dia of France, with a personal best clearance of 5.45 metres, having already led the competition on count-back from Dia, with a first-time 5.40m clearance. Before the event, Rogö said he received a message of support from compatriot and world record holder Mondo Duplantis, saying afterwards that he was "truly an inspiration". Later that month, he cleared 5.27 metres to place fifth at the Finnkampen event in Stockholm, won by Duplantis.
