= Marina Hadjicosta =

Cypriot athlete (born 2009)

Personal information
- Born: 8 February 2009 (age 17)

Sport
- Sport: Athletics
- Events: Discus throw, Shot put
Medal record
Women's athletics
Representing Cyprus
Youth Olympic Games
Gold medal – first place	2026 Dakar	Discus throw
World U20 Championships
Bronze medal – third place	2026 Eugene	Discus throw
European U18 Championships
Gold medal – first place	2026 Rieti	Discus throw
European Youth Olympic Festival
Bronze medal – third place	2025 Skopje	Discus throw

Marina Hadjicosta (Greek: Μαρίνα Χατζηκώστα; born 8 February 2009) is a Cypriot discus thrower. The senior national champion in 2026, she won the gold medal at the 2026 European Athletics U18 Championships and the 2026 Summer Youth Olympics. She was the bronze medalist at the 2026 World Athletics U20 Championships.

== Career ==
Hadjicosta trains at Laniteio Lyceum in Limassol and is coached by Konstantinos Stavrou. Competing at the 18th European Youth Festival in Skopje in July 2025, Hadjicosta won the bronze medal in the discus throw with a throw of 47.41 metres.

Hadjicosta became the senior Cypriot national champion in 2026 in both the discus throw and the shot put. Having entered the competition as the European U18 leader by nearly five metres, Hadjicosta won the gold medal at the 2026 European Athletics U18 Championships with her fourth round throw of 56.17 metres, winning ahead of shot put champion Emma le Blansch of the Netherlands.

She was the bronze medalist in the discus throw at the 2026 World Athletics U20 Championships in Eugene, United States. In doing so, she became the first Cypriot female athlete to win a medal in the discipline at the championships. In November, she won the gold medal at the 2026 Summer Youth Olympics in Dakar, with a throw of 53.20 m. She was nominated for European Athletics Women’s Rising Star for 2026.
