= 2026 World Athletics U20 Championships =

International athletics competition

- Host city: Eugene, United States
- Events: 46
- Dates: 5–9 August 2026
- Main venue: Hayward Field
- Website: worldathletics.org

The 2026 World Athletics U20 Championships, also known colloquially by its former official title, the World Junior Championships, was an international athletics competition for athletes qualifying as juniors (born no earlier than 1 January 2007), which was held from 5 to 9 August 2026 at Hayward Field in Eugene, United States.

== Schedule ==
Q	Qualification	H	Heats	S	Semifinals	F	Final
M = morning session, A = afternoon session

Men
Date →	5 Aug		6 Aug		7 Aug		8 Aug		9 Aug
Event ↓	M	A	M	A	M	A	M	A	A
100 m	H	S		F					
200 m					H	S		F	
400 m			H	S		F			
800 m	H					S		F	
1500 m				H					F
3000 m						F			
5000 m		F							
110 m hurdles					H	S		F	
400 m hurdles			H					S	F
3000 m SC			H						F
4 × 100 m relay							H		F
4 × 400 m relay							H		F
5000 m walk							F		
Decathlon					F				
High jump			Q					F	
Pole vault				Q					F
Long jump					Q			F	
Triple jump			Q			F			
Shot put	Q	F							
Discus throw							Q		F
Hammer throw	Q					F			
Javelin throw		Q				F			

Women
Date →	5 Aug		6 Aug		7 Aug		8 Aug		9 Aug
Event ↓	M	A	M	A	M	A	M	A	A
100 m	H	S		F					
200 m					H	S		F	
400 m			H	S		F			
800 m	H					S		F	
1500 m				H					F
3000 m								F	
5000 m		F							
100 m hurdles					H	S		F	
400 m hurdles			H					S	F
3000 m SC		H				F			
4 × 100 m relay							H		F
4 × 400 m relay							H		F
5000 m walk							F		
Heptathlon	F								
High jump					Q				F
Pole vault		Q				F			
Long jump	Q			F					
Triple jump							Q		F
Shot put			Q	F					
Discus throw	Q			F					
Hammer throw					Q				F
Javelin throw					Q				F

Mixed
Date →	5 Aug		6 Aug		7 Aug		8 Aug		9 Aug
Event ↓	M	A	M	A	M	A	M	A	A
4 × 100 m relay			H					F	
4 × 400 m relay	H	F							

== Medal table ==
* Host nation (United States)

Rank	Nation	Gold	Silver	Bronze	Total
1	United States*	12	7	5	24
2	Kenya	4	3	4	11
3	Italy	3	0	2	5
4	Jamaica	2	3	3	8
5	Australia	2	3	1	6
5	Ethiopia	2	3	1	6
7	France	2	2	2	6
8	China	2	1	2	5
9	Czech Republic	2	1	1	4
10	South Africa	1	3	4	8
11	Finland	1	1	0	2
11	Romania	1	1	0	2
13	Spain	1	0	3	4
14	Germany	1	0	2	3
15	Morocco	1	0	1	2
15	Uganda	1	0	1	2
17	Algeria	1	0	0	1
17	Brazil	1	0	0	1
17	Bulgaria	1	0	0	1
17	Egypt	1	0	0	1
17	Nigeria	1	0	0	1
17	Poland	1	0	0	1
17	Slovenia	1	0	0	1
17	Sweden	1	0	0	1
25	Estonia	0	3	0	3
26	Great Britain	0	2	4	6
27	Greece	0	2	1	3
27	India	0	2	1	3
27	Japan	0	2	1	3
30	Switzerland	0	1	1	2
31	Croatia	0	1	0	1
31	Ecuador	0	1	0	1
31	Hungary	0	1	0	1
31	Netherlands	0	1	0	1
31	South Korea	0	1	0	1
31	Ukraine	0	1	0	1
37	Barbados	0	0	1	1
37	Belgium	0	0	1	1
37	Chinese Taipei	0	0	1	1
37	Cyprus	0	0	1	1
37	Dominica	0	0	1	1
37	Guyana	0	0	1	1
Totals (42 entries)		46	46	46	138

== Men's results ==
Event	Gold		Silver		Bronze	
100 metres (Wind: 0.1 m/s)	Tate Taylor; United States	9.94 PB	Gary Card; Jamaica	10.05	Marko Ferreira; South Africa	10.16
200 metres (Wind: 0.1 m/s)	Tate Taylor; United States	19.83 CR	Blake Hamilton; United States	20.31	Jayden Green; Barbados	20.55
400 metres	Jayden DeLeon; United States	44.47 CR	Quincy Wilson; United States	44.62 SB	Leendert Koekemoer; South Africa	44.96
800 metres	Imad Bouchajda; Morocco	1:44.64	Daniel Williams; Australia	1:45.36	Alejandro Ríos; Spain	1:46.25 PB
1500 metres	Wilson Chepkwech; Kenya	3:37.46 PB	David Kapaiko Sekento; Kenya	3:38.32 PB	Osama Er Redouani; Morocco	3:39.68 PB
3000 metres	Emmanuel Kiprono; Kenya	7:28.28 CR, WU20L	Aloïs Abraham; France	7:47.79	Ojiro Honda; Japan	7:48.49 NU20R
5000 metres	Frankline Kibet; Kenya	13:28.27	Nehemiah Kipgeno; Kenya	13:30.09	Damitew Kebede; Ethiopia	13:35.38 PB
110 metres hurdles (Wind: +0.7 m/s)	Le'Ezra Brown; United States	12.72 =WU20R	Jeremy Koga; Japan	12.97	Zacchaeus Brocks; United States	12.98 =PB
400 metres hurdles	Michal Rada; Czech Republic	48.59 AU20R	Taiju Goto; Japan	49.23	Matodzi Ndou; South Africa	49.90
3000 metres steeplechase	Bakr El Asri; Spain	8:28.35 AU20R	Emmanuel Lemiso Someki; Kenya	8:32.81	Nicholas Kitum Losiwareng; Kenya	8:38.05
4 × 100 metres relay	United States; Blake Hamilton; Dillon Mitchell; Kyler Brown; Tate Taylor; Jayson Smith*; Auralleus Hicks*	38.16 WU20R	Great Britain; Divine Iheme; Jake Odey-Jordan; Ethan Franklin; James Arminio; Mayo Alabi*	38.90 =AU20R	Jamaica; Kyle Bodden; Gary Card; Nyrone Wade; Sanjay Seymore; Nathaniel Martin*	39.01 SB
4 × 400 metres relay	United States; Quincy Wilson; Cameron Tucker; Alexander Osayemi; Jayden DeLeon; Ade Lloyd*; Carlo Johnson*	3:01.39 WU20L	South Africa; Ryno Riekert; Kryn Romijn; Abelines Schoeman; Leendert Koekemoer	3:02.76 AU20R	France; Milann Klemencic; Rayan Bouhouche; Lucas Couderc; Dylan Telo; Kristen Colly*; Hugo Charlet*	3:04.80 NU20R
5000 m walk	Isaac Beacroft; Australia	18:40.37 WU20R	Pu Huajia; China	18:43.70 AU20R	Nicolò Vidal; Italy	18:56.19 PB
High jump	Younes Ayachi; Algeria	2.21 m	Basant Meghwal; India	2.21 m =PB	Otis Poole; Great Britain	2.21 m PB
Pole vault	Zackaria Dia; France	5.80	Henri Apri; Estonia	5.75 NU20R	Isaiah Whitaker; United States	5.45
Long jump	Daniele Inzoli; Italy	7.97 m	Mason McGroder; Australia	7.96 m PB	Shahnavaz Khan; India	7.84 m
Triple jump	Michael-Andre Edwards; Jamaica	17.08 m WU20L	Miles Nesmith; United States	16.79 m PB	Wang Zhuoyue; China	16.36 m
Shot put	Alessandro Borges; Brazil	20.35 m PB	Park Si-hoon; South Korea	20.31 m	Jaco van Dyk; South Africa	19.80 m PB
Discus throw	Simon Rosselli; United States	66.39 m	Sten-Erik Iir; Estonia	65.42 m	Joseph Salmon; Jamaica	64.37 m
Hammer throw	Chen Jiawei; China	79.16 m	Kayden Hulet; United States	77.55 m PB	Wyatt Larkins; Great Britain	75.38 m PB
Javelin throw	Jan-Hendrik Heymans; South Africa	80.50 m WU20L	Ashish Yadav; India	74.09 m	Addison James; Dominica	73.89 m NU20R
Decathlon	Liam Belo da Silva; Sweden	8112 pts	Mikai Snoek; Netherlands	7887 pts	Adam Juliš; Czech Republic	7877 pts

== Women's results ==
Event	Gold		Silver		Bronze	
100 metres (Wind: -0.1 m/s)	Mia Maxwell; United States	11.14	Shanoya Douglas; Jamaica	11.17	Kelly Doualla; Italy	11.27
200 metres (Wind: -0.2 m/s)	Mia Maxwell; United States	22.37 PB	Shanoya Douglas; Jamaica	22.68	Mariah Maxwell; United States	22.77
400 metres	Anastazja Kuś; Poland	51.06 NU20R	Ataja Stephanie-Vazquez; United States	51.36	Tianna Springer; Guyana	51.76
800 metres	Živa Remic; Slovenia	2:03.03	Ioulianna Roussou; Greece	2:03.08	Shaikira King; Great Britain	2:03.52
1500 metres	Josephine Sembeyo Mancha; Kenya	4:16.73	Claire Stegall; United States	4:16.77	Caren Chepchirchir; Kenya	4:17.50
3000 metres	Yordanos Tsigab; Ethiopia	8:43.65 PB	Shito Gumi; Ethiopia	8:45.06	Charity Cherop; Uganda	8:45.59
5000 metres	Charity Cherop; Uganda	15:03.88	Shito Gumi; Ethiopia	15:07.91	Joyline Chepkemoi; Kenya	15:09.08 PB
100 metres hurdles (Wind: -0.2 m/s)	Madeline Cooper; United States	12.91 =WU20L	Tumi Ramokgopa; South Africa	12.96	Tiana Marshall; Jamaica	12.97 PB
400 metres hurdles	Alexandra Ștefania Uță; Romania	55.33 AU20R	Tumi Ramokgopa; South Africa	55.88 PB	Eleni Iakovaki; Greece	55.99 NU20R
3000 metres steeplechase	Almaz Yohannis; Ethiopia	9:15.81 WU20L	Wosane Asefa; Ethiopia	9:30.50 PB	Anatasha Cheptoo; Kenya	9:37.18
4 × 100 metres relay	Jamaica; Sashana Johnson; Theianna-Lee Terrelonge; Natrece East; Shanoya Douglas; Samoya Brown*; Renecia Edwards*	42.89 WU20L	Switzerland; Mara Schwitter; Xenia Buri; Milla Tonazzi; Joy Umegbolu	43.36	Belgium; Lore Foesters; Lauren Petroci-Coninx; Martha Geerardyn; Ilona Dhaenens	43.91 NU20R
4 × 400 metres relay	United States; Ashtyn Lewis; Olivia Harris; Clara Adams; Taylor-Nicole Overton; Sydney Kuhn*	3:29.15 WU20L	Australia; Shari Hurdman; Xanthee Watts; Charlotte McAuliffe; Alice Hill	3:31.39 SB	Great Britain; Caitlin Hadfield; Shiloh Omotosho; Casey Musgrave; Camiah Bennett; Noa Chodokufa*	3:32.08 SB
5000 m walk	Serena di Fabio; Italy	20:57.57 CR	Chloé Le Roch; France	21:17.92 NU20R	Yang Yutong; China	21:31.99 PB
High jump	Izobelle Louison-Roe; Australia	1.92 m	Lilianna Bátori; Hungary	1.90 m	Aitana Alonso; Spain	1.90 m =NU20R
Pole vault	Nicole Krutilová; Czech Republic	4.45 m	Olha Belchenko; Ukraine	4.40 m	Kylie Neira; United States	4.35 m
Long jump	Djelika Diarra; France	6.52 m WU20L	Evelyn Mitropoulou; Greece	6.44 m	Soudatou Niang; France	6.34 m =PB
Triple jump	Viktoria Angelova; Bulgaria	13.91 m	Daria Vrînceanu; Romania	13.70 m SB	Ana Estrella de León; Spain	13.58 m SB
Shot put	Jessica Oji; Nigeria	18.08 m	Belsy Quiñónez; Ecuador	17.90 m NU20R	Emily Scherf; Germany	17.23 m PB
Discus throw	Su Yixin; China	61.06 m WU20L	Jaslene Massey; United States	58.41 m	Marina Hadjicosta; Cyprus	54.88 m
Hammer throw	Clara Hegemann; Germany	68.99 m	Pinja Kärhä; Finland	68.51 m	Nova Kienast; Germany	67.89 m SB
Javelin throw	Aseel Osama Abdel Hamid; Egypt	59.82 m	Vita Barbić; Croatia	56.60 m	Tai Yu-chin; Chinese Taipei	54.34 m
Heptathlon	Enni Virjonen; Finland	6214 pts WU20L	Mia Mirela Uusorg; Estonia	5961 pts	Anna Pfister; Switzerland	5850 pts PB

== Mixed results ==
Event	Gold		Silver		Bronze	
Mixed 4 × 100 metres relay	Italy; Edwin Fermin Galvan; Elisa Valensin; Francesco Pagliarini; Kelly Doualla; Elisa Calzolari*; Carlotta Suppini*	41.21 WU20R	Great Britain; Divine Iheme; Savannah Morgan; Mathew Ajayi; Sophie Thomas	41.38 PB	United States; Cy Lugo; Ahlayna Taylor; Nicholas Altheimer; Ava Kitchings; Aster Jones*	41.39 SB
Mixed 4 × 400 metres relay	United States; Joshua Shelton; Taylor-Nicole Overton; Jaelen Hunter; Olivia Harris; Natalie Dumas*	3:15.31 CR	Czech Republic; Lukáš Mareš; Sophie Pischnothová; Jakub Marek; Linda Botková; Kateřina Čechová	3:18.16 NU20R	Australia; Dylan Ruming; Xanthee Watts; Fred Hamblin; Charlotte McAuliffe	3:18.45 NU20R

* – Indicates the athlete competed in preliminary heats but not the final.

== Qualifying Standards ==
Event	Men	Women
100 m	10.50	11.78
200 m	21.25	24.35
400 m	47.40	55.20
800 m	1:50.00	2:09.00
1500 m	3:47.50	4:27.00
3000 m	8:04.00	9:27.00
5000 m	14:08.00	16:25.00
3000 m sc	9:00.00	10:36.00
100 mH	–	14.10
110 mH	14.05; 00.991	–
400 mH	53.00	1:00.75
5000 m RW	20:50.00 (43:30.00*)	24:00.00 (49:20.00*)
4 × 100 m Relay	No standard	No standard
4 × 400 m Relay	No standard	No standard
4 × 100 m Mixed Relay	No standard	No standard
4 × 400 m Mixed Relay	No standard	No standard
Heptathlon	–	5280 points
Decathlon	7100 points	–
High Jump	2.11	1.81
Pole Vault	5.12	4.05
Long Jump	7.58	6.22
Triple Jump	15.45	13.00
Shot Put	18.30 (6 kg)	14.50 (4 kg)
Discus	56.00	49.00
Hammer	68.00 (6 kg)	57.50
Javelin	68.50	49.50

* – For the 5000 m Race Walk, 10 km and 10,000 m times will be accepted as will all road performances for both distances.

== Participation ==
The following is a list of participating nations with the number of qualified athletes in brackets. A country without any qualified athlete could enter either one male or one female. A total 147 National Associations and 1858 athletes are scheduled to compete.

- Algeria (16)
- Andorra (1)
- Angola (1)
- Antigua and Barbuda (3)
- Argentina (5)
- Armenia (5)
- Aruba (1)
- Australia (73)
- Austria (8)
- Azerbaijan (1)
- Bahamas (18)
- Bangladesh (1)
- Barbados (16)
- Belgium (27)
- Belize (1)
- Bermuda (1)
- Bolivia (2)
- Bosnia and Herzegovina (6)
- Botswana (11)
- Brazil (33)
- British Virgin Islands (5)
- Bulgaria (15)
- Cape Verde (1)
- Cameroon (1)
- Canada (45)
- Cayman Islands (1)
- Chile (15)
- China (38)
- Chinese Taipei (7)
- Colombia (17)
- Cook Islands (1)
- Costa Rica (1)
- Croatia (17)
- Cuba (3)
- Cyprus (11)
- Czech Republic (30)
- Denmark (6)
- Dominica (2)
- Djibouti (1)
- Dominican Republic (2)
- Ecuador (15)
- Egypt (10)
- El Salvador (1)
- Estonia (14)
- Ethiopia (17)
- Fiji (1)
- Finland (15)
- France (53)
- French Polynesia (1)
- Georgia (2)
- Germany (91)
- Ghana (2)
- Great Britain (55)
- Greece (26)
- Grenada (1)
- Guam (1)
- Guatemala (1)
- Guinea (1)
- Guyana (12)
- Haiti (3)
- Honduras (1)
- Hong Kong (10)
- Hungary (28)
- Iceland (5)
- India (37)
- Indonesia (2)
- Ireland (37)
- Israel (5)
- Italy (64)
- Ivory Coast (1)
- Jamaica (47)
- Japan (43)
- Jordan (1)
- Kazakhstan (11)
- Kenya (24)
- Kyrgyzstan (1)
- Latvia (11)
- Lebanon (1)
- Lithuania (2)
- Luxembourg (1)
- Macau (1)
- Malawi (1)
- Malaysia (4)
- Maldives (1)
- Mali (1)
- Malta (3)
- Mauritius (1)
- Mexico (27)
- Moldova (1)
- Monaco (1)
- Morocco (10)
- Namibia (1)
- Netherlands (20)
- New Zealand (18)
- Nicaragua (1)
- Nigeria (15)
- North Macedonia (1)
- Northern Mariana Islands (1)
- Norway (18)
- Oman (1)
- Pakistan (1)
- Panama (1)
- Papua New Guinea (6)
- Paraguay (1)
- Peru (15)
- Philippines (3)
- Poland (49)
- Portugal (19)
- Puerto Rico (6)
- Qatar (5)
- Romania (11)
- Rwanda (1)
- Saint Kitts and Nevis (3)
- Saint Lucia (3)
- Saint Vincent and the Grenadines (1)
- San Marino (1)
- Saudi Arabia (11)
- Senegal (1)
- Serbia (18)
- Seychelles (1)
- Singapore (2)
- Slovakia (32)
- Slovenia (24)
- South Sudan (1)
- South Africa (53)
- South Korea (19)
- Spain (50)
- Sri Lanka (17)
- Sweden (21)
- Gambia (1)
- Switzerland (42)
- Tonga (1)
- Trinidad and Tobago (20)
- Tunisia (10)
- Turkey (5)
- Turks and Caicos Islands (1)
- Uganda (11)
- Ukraine (18)
- United Arab Emirates (3)
- United States (110) (hosts)
- United States Virgin Islands (2)
- Uruguay (1)
- Venezuela (1)
- Zimbabwe (9)

== Broadcasting ==
- Africa – SuperSport
- Australia – Seven Network
- Canada – CBC Sports
- Europe – Eurovision Sports
- United States – Peacock
