= Ataja Stephane-Vazquez =

American sprinter (born 2008)

Personal information
- Born: 28 May 2008 (age 18)

Sport
- Sport: Athletics
- Event: Sprint
Medal record
Women's athletics
Representing United States
World U20 Championships
Silver medal – second place	2026 Eugene	400m

Ataja Stephane-Vazquez (born 25 May 2008) is an American sprinter.

== Biography ==
Stephane-Vazquez was educated in North Carolina at Southeast Guilford High School and joined the high school track team in her sophomore year. She joined up with the Greenboro Cheetahs in 2024, and won the bronze medal in the 15-16yo age group over 400 metres at the AAU Junior Olympic Games in August 2024.

Coached by James Daniels, Head of Sprints and Hurdles for the NSAF Nike Elite Programs, she won the 2026 USATF U20 Championships 400 metres title in a personal-best 51.09 seconds. She represented the United States at the 2026 World Athletics U20 Championships and was the fastest of all qualifiers for the final of the 400 metres, having also topped the times for the semi-finals. In the final, she won the silver medal behind Anastazja Kuś of Poland, running 51.36 seconds.
