= Nova Kienast =

German hammer thrower (born 2007)

Personal information
- Born: 24 July 2007 (age 19)

Sport
- Sport: Athletics
- Event: Hammer throw

Achievements and titles
- Personal bests: Hammer: 68.54 m (2025), 3 kg: 78.16 m (2024) WU18B
Medal record
Women's athletics
Representing Germany
World U20 Championships
Bronze medal – third place	2026 Eugene	Hammer throw
European U20 Championships
Gold medal – first place	2025 Tampere	Hammer
European U18 Championships
Bronze medal – third place	2024 Banská Bystrica	Hammer

Nova Kienast (born 24 July 2007) is a German hammer thrower. She set a world under-18 best distance with the 3 kg hammer in December 2024.

== Biography ==
She trained under Thomas Brack in Berlin, but also spent time in Canada in 2024 in the same training group as Olympic champion Ethan Katzberg.

She threw 72.17 metres to win the 3 kg hammer throw at the German U18 Championships in Monchengladbach in July 2024. She won the bronze medal in the 3 kg hammer throw at the 2024 European Athletics U18 Championships with a throw of 71.72m in Banská Bystrica, Slovakia. She placed fifth in the 4 kg hammer throw at the 2024 World Athletics U20 Championships in Lima, Peru, with 63.81 metres as a 17-year-old.

In December 2024, Kienast set a new U18 world best for the 3 kg hammer throw whilst competing in the United States in Mesa, Arizona, with a throw of 78.16 meters. The previous longest throw by a U18 athlete with the 3 kg hammer was achieved by Réka Gyurátz of Hungary with 76.04 m in 2013. She would go on to throw to 78.34 meters a day later in Tucson, Arizona. Kienast became a member of SCC Berlin in 2025 having previously been a member of SV Preußen Berlin.

In March 2025, she set a new German U20 record for the hammer throw with a throw of 68.54 metres whilst competing in Canada, breaking the record set by Bianca Achilles in the late 1990s. In August, she won the gold medal at the 2025 European Athletics U20 Championships in Tampere, Finland, moving from fourth to first with her final round throw of 67.93 metres.

Competing at the 2026 World Athletics U20 Championships in Eugene, USA, she qualified for the final with her best throw in qualifying being 64.75 metres, before winning the bronze medal in the final.
