= Jil Sanchez =

Swiss athlete (born 2007)

Personal information
- Born: 12 August 2007 (age 19)

Sport
- Sport: Athletics
- Event: Hurdles

Achievements and titles
- Personal bests: 60m hurdles: 8.14 (2026); 100m hurdles: 12.96 (2026)
Medal record
Women's athletics
Representing Switzerland
European U20 Championships
Gold medal – first place	2025 Tampere	100 m hurdles

Jil Sanchez (born 12 August 2007) is a Swiss sprint hurdler. She became European under-20 champion in the 100 metres hurdles in 2025.

== Career ==
Competing as a member of TSV Steinen, Sanchez ran a personal best of 13.01 seconds for the 100 metres hurdles in Luxembourg in July 2025.

Sanchez had the number one ranking for European under-20 female athletes for the 100 metres hurdles in 2025. She was the pre-race favourite and subsequently won the gold medal in the 100 metres hurdles at the 2025 European Athletics U20 Championships in Tampere, Finland, in August 2025 winning in her heat and her semi-final before claiming victory in the final in a time of 13.24 seconds into a -1.5m/ps headwind. Later that month, she placed third overall in the 100m hurdles at the senior Swiss Athletics Championships in Frauenfeld.

In September 2025, she was nominated for the European Athletics female rising star award, alongside compatriot Audrey Werro.

Sanchez was a finalist at the senior Swiss Indoor Championships over 60 metres hurdles on 1 March 2026, placing fifth in the final.

== Personal life ==
Sanchez is from Schwyz in Switzerland, and is a natural German speaker.
