= Athletics at the 2025 African Youth Games =

- Dates: 11–13 December
- Host city: Luanda, Angola
- Venue: José Armando Sayovo Sports Complex
- Level: Youth (under 18)
- Events: 36

The athletics competitions at the 2018 African Youth Games in Luanda, Angola was held between 24 and 27 July at the José Armando Sayovo Sports Complex. The competition served as the qualification for the 2026 Summer Youth Olympics set to take place in November 2026 in Dakar, Senegal.

== Medal summary ==
=== Boys ===
Event	Gold		Silver		Bronze	
100 metres	Micah Africa (RSA)	10.67	Emmanuel Oluwadamilare Akolo (NGR)	10.76	Miheshco Mouton (NAM)	10.78
200 metres	Jayden Fourie (RSA)	20.88	Perfect Faye (NGR)	21.47	Miheshco Mouton (NAM)	21.66
400 metres	Jaydon Fairlie (RSA)	47.66	David Udoh (NGR)	47.77	Agyaemang Evans (GHA)	48.23
800 metres	Hika Regassa (ETH)	1:53.30	Yasser Riad Bouzid (ALG)	1:56.15	Kevin Kipkosgei (KEN)	1:56.73
1500 metres	David Kapaiko (KEN)	3:52.01	Alemayo Temesgen (ETH)	3:53.16	Khalid Ahmed Miguil (DJI)	3:54.09
3000 metres	Rueson Alexander (ERI)	8:02.06	Wesley Kiplagat (KEN)	8:03.14	Mekonen Kidane (ETH)	8:26.52
110 metres hurdles (91.4 cm)	Yahya Mohamed Saad (EGY)	14.08	Brice Tailly (MRI)	14.28	Abdulrachid Traore (BUR)	14.64
400 metres hurdles (84.0 cm)	Med Aziz Chniter (TUN)	53.54	Oghenerunor Gowon (NGR)	55.20	Yahya Mohamed Saad (EGY)	56.01
2000 metres steeplechase	Jairus Byegon (KEN)	5:39.6	Elmi Hamza Kouameh (DJI)	5:42.0	Abdou Wasse (ETH)	5:43.0
Medley relay	Nigeria; Oghenerunor Gowon; Emmanuel Akolo; David Udoh; Esan Solomon Tosin	1:53.13	South Africa; Micah Africa; Jayden Fourie; Emil Els; Jaydon Fairlie	1:53.44	Gambia; Buba Bayo; Musa Kujabi ? Modou Lamin Touray	1:56.53
5000 metres track walk	Youssef Anwar (EGY)	21:34.00	Najlaoui Montadhar (TUN)	23:28.57	Aymen Gueddoul (ALG)	24:15.69
High jump	Matao Le Roux (RSA)	1.95	Abdulrahman Abdulhalim Ali (EGY)	1.90	Amine Abassi (TUN)	1.950
Long jump	Jayden Fourie (RSA)	7.59	Godswill Nkemakolam (NGR)	7.18	Leith Bencharef (ALG)	6.76
Triple jump	Timothy Ugherakpoteni (NGR)	15.22	Abdulrachid Traore (BUR)	14.78	Orion Aaron Rossette (MRI)	14.46
Shot put (5 kg)	Yahya Khaled Helmy (EGY)	19.80	Dewald Bezuidenhout (RSA)	18.92	Makhlouf Souhail (TUN)	15.53
Discus throw (1.5 kg)	Joshua Gerber (RSA)	63.99 GR	Yahya Khaled Helmy (EGY)	60.78	Seifeddin Chouikh (TUN)	55.46
Hammer throw (5 kg)	Samir Abdelghani (EGY)	69.15	Makhlouf Souhail (TUN)	32.26	Not awarded	
Javelin throw (700 g)	Jacobus Van der Merwe (RSA)	69.39	Nehemie Clair (MRI)	56.90	Abdullah Ragab (EGY)	56.87

=== Girls ===
Event	Gold		Silver		Bronze	
100 metres	Rosemary Nwankwo (NGR)	11.77	Oluchi Ndubueze (RSA)	12.12	Maria Saadi (MAR)	12.27
200 metres	Tejiri Praise Ugoh (NGR)	23.95	Isabella Gunter (RSA)	25.38	Adama Njie (GAM)	26.01
400 metres	Hafsoh Majekodunmi (NGR)	55.16	Desta Ware (ETH)	56.74	Athouaby Louaka (CGO)	58.22
800 metres	Vicody Chemutai (KEN)	2:07.9	Khadija El Mostaqim (MAR)	2:08.4	Bilise Gelan (ETH)	2:09.1
1500 metres	Hana Negesa (ETH)	4:26.1	Baskaline Cherotwo (UGA)	4:28.4	Milicent Kipyekomen (KEN)	4:36.4
3000 metres	Elsabet Amare (ETH)	9:32.71	Lonah Cherono (KEN)	9:40.80	Keren Chelimo (UGA)	9:41.89
100 metres hurdles (76.2 cm)	Megan Nieman (RSA)	13.33 GR	Lume Jansen van Rensburg (NAM)	14.66	Ranim Bachraoui (TUN)	14.94
400 metres hurdles	Megan Nieman (RSA)	60.15	Mary Coffie (GHA)	61.37	Malak El Maaroufi (MAR)	61.50
2000 m steeplechase	Caren Chepngen (KEN)	6:33.92	Bilsuma Teshome (ETH)	6:41.17	Salma Maataoui (MAR)	7:04.25
Medley relay	Nigeria; Mariam Jegede Adefunke; Miracle Ezechukwu; Faith Ezechukwu; Jacinter Lawrence	2:12.64	South Africa; Isabella Gunter; Oluchi Ndubueze; Megan Nieman; Skyler van Dyk	2:17.15	Ethiopia	2:19.18
5000 m track walk	Hiwot Ambaw (ETH)	24:00.01 GR	Fatma Zohra Gouessoum (ALG)	25:46.00	Rim Slimi (TUN)	26:29.93
High jump	Anri Rautenbach (RSA)	1.75 =GR	Alexandra Scheepers (NAM)	1.70	Olemba Nguebong (CMR)	1.55
Long jump	Maria Saadi (MAR)	6.26 GR	Oluchi Ndubueze (RSA)	6.00	Christiana Eghan (GHA)	5.60
Triple jump	Hala Khadija Mefti (ALG)	12.14	Selena Jolicour (MRI)	11.90	Christiana Eghan (GHA)	11.87
Shot put (3 kg)	Johanne Lamprecht (RSA)	16.98 GR	Alaa Tamer El Sayed (EGY)	15.50	Kater Ennada Jaoued (TUN)	14.22
Discus throw	Kater Ennada Jaoued (TUN)	46.30	Johanne Lamprecht (RSA)	43.30	Amer Abdelghani Barhouma (EGY)	42.62
Hammer throw (3 kg)	Mariam Reda Ahmed (EGY)	49.92	Aya Amrane (ALG)	49.29	Nour Khal Letaief (TUN)	48.63
Javelin throw (500 g)	Remas Haytham (EGY)	49.89	Nicola van der Merwe (RSA)	45.76	Yolanda Nyarugwe (ZIM)	36.43

== Medal table ==
Rank	Nation	Gold	Silver	Bronze	Total
1	South Africa (RSA)	11	8	0	19
2	Nigeria (NGR)	6	5	0	11
3	Egypt (EGY)	6	3	3	12
4	Ethiopia (ETH)	4	3	4	11
5	Kenya (KEN)	4	2	2	8
6	Tunisia (TUN)	2	2	7	11
7	Algeria (ALG)	1	3	2	6
8	Morocco (MAR)	1	1	3	5
9	Eritrea (ERI)	1	0	0	1
10	Mauritius (MRI)	0	3	1	4
11	Namibia (NAM)	0	2	2	4
12	Ghana (GHA)	0	1	3	4
13	Burkina Faso (BUR)	0	1	1	2
13	Djibouti (DJI)	0	1	1	2
13	Uganda (UGA)	0	1	1	2
16	Gambia (GAM)	0	0	2	2
17	Cameroon (CMR)	0	0	1	1
17	Congo (CGO)	0	0	1	1
17	Zimbabwe (ZIM)	0	0	1	1
Totals (19 entries)		36	36	35	107
