= Christi Loggenberg =

South African athlete (born 2009)

Personal information
- Born: 9 January 2009 (age 17)

Sport
- Sport: Athletics
- Event(s): Sprint, Hurdles

Achievements and titles
- Personal best(s): 400m: 52.33 (2026); 400mH: 56.54 (2026)

Christi Loggenberg (born 9 January 2009) is a South African sprinter and hurdler. She is the South African U18 record holder in the 400 metres.

== Biography ==
A member of Athletics Gauteng North (AGN), Loggenberg set a new South African U18 national record for the 400 metres in winning the South African U18 Championships in March 2026 with 52.33 seconds. At the championships she also placed second in 57.11 seconds in the 400 metres hurdles behind South African U18 record holder Megan Nieman. The following month, she ran 36.63 seconds to record the sixth fastest in the 300 metres at the Simbine Classic in South Africa. She was selected for the South African team for the 2026 World Athletics Relays in Gaborone, Botswana. On the opening day, she ran in the women’s 4 x 400 metres relay as the South Africa team finished fourth in their race in 3:26.77.
