= List of European youth bests in athletics =

European youth bests in the sport of athletics are ratified by the European Athletics Association (EAA). Athletics records comprise the best performance of an athlete before the year of their 18th birthday. Technically, in all under-18 age divisions, the age is calculated "on December 31 of the year of competition".

== Outdoor ==
Key: Awaiting ratification Record not kept by EAA Not ratified or later rescinded by EAA

=== Boys ===
Event	Record	Athlete	Nationality	Date	Meet	Place	Age	Ref.
100 m	10.26 (+0.6 m/s)	Teddy Wilson	Great Britain	24 June 2023	DLV Junioren Gala	Mannheim, Germany	16 years, 207 days	
200 m	20.37 (+1.9 m/s)	Thomas Somers	Great Britain	24 July 2014	World Junior Championships	Eugene, United States	17 years, 87 days	
400 m	46.12	Tomáš Horák	Czech Republic	22 June 2025		Ostrava, Czech Republic	17 years, 109 days	
400 m	46.04	Štefan Balošák	Czechoslovakia	27 August 1988		Banská Bystrica, Czechoslovakia	15 years, 278 days	
600 m	1:17.01	Elie Grzib	Spain	1 July 2026		Gavá, Spain	15 years, 57 days	
800 m	1:45.36	Max Burgin	Great Britain	23 June 2019	England Championships	Bedford, United Kingdom	17 years, 34 days	
1000 m	2:20.37	Johan Boakes	Great Britain	17 June 1984		Loughborough, United Kingdom	16 years, 66 days	
1500 m	3:38.62	Aloïs Abraham	France	28 June 2025	Meeting de Carquefou	Carquefou, France	16 years, 338 days	
Mile	3:56.29	Jakob Ingebrigtsen	Norway	15 June 2017	Bislett Games	Oslo, Norway	16 years, 269 days	
2000 m	5:04.90	Aldin Ćatović	Serbia	8 September 2024		Zagreb, Croatia	17 years, 155 days	
3000 m	7:48.25	Niels Laros	Netherlands	11 September 2022	Hanžeković Memorial	Zagreb, Croatia	17 years, 147 days	
5000 m	13:35.84	Jakob Ingebrigtsen	Norway	25 August 2017	Norwegian Championships	Sandnes, Norway	16 years, 340 days	
5 km (road)	13:38	Aloïs Abraham	France	31 December 2025	Cursa dels Nassos	Barcelona, Spain	17 years, 159 days	
10,000 m	29:21.92	Sondre Nordstad Moen	Norway	31 May 2008	Neerpelt Nacht van de Euregio	Neerpelt, Belgium	17 years, 140 days	
10 km (road)	28:39	Meziane Benhammou	France	4 October 2026	tRUNsylvania International 10K Brasov	Brașov, Romania	17 years, 240 days	
Half marathon								
Marathon								
110 m hurdles (91.4 cm)	12.96 (+1.3 m/s)	Eljahro Philipsen	Netherlands	18 July 2026	European U18 Championships	Rieti, Italy	16 years, 339 days	
110 m hurdles (99/100 cm)	13.29 (−1.0 m/s)	Wilhem Belocian	France	12 July 2012	World Junior Championships	Barcelona, Spain	17 years, 20 days	
110 m hurdles (106.7 cm)	13.75 (−0.3 m/s)	Ladji Doucouré	France	19 October 2000	World Junior Championships	Santiago de Chile, Chile	17 years, 205 days	
400 m hurdles (84.0 cm)	49.42	Michal Rada	Czech Republic	21 July 2024	European U18 Championships	Banská Bystrica Slovakia	17 years, 57 days	
400 m hurdles (91.4 cm)	49.30	Michal Rada	Czech Republic	31 August 2024	World U20 Championships	Lima, Peru	17 years, 98 days	
1500 m steeplechase	4:04.85	Antonio Álvarez	Spain	25 June 1993		Málaga, Spain	16 years, 126 days	
2000 m steeplechase	5:31.54	Nikolay Matyushenko	Soviet Union	27 August 1983		Schwechat, West Germany	17 years, 235 days	
3000 m steeplechase	8:26.81	Jakob Ingebrigtsen	Norway	8 July 2017	Guldensporenmeeting	Kortrijk, Belgium	16 years, 292 days	
High jump	2.28 m	Oleksandr Nartov	Ukraine	28 May 2005		Kyiv, Ukraine	17 years, 7 days	
Pole vault	5.55 m (Note: Outdoor best; indoor mark ratified as absolute record.)	Emmanouil Karalis	Greece	20 May 2016	Golden Spike Ostrava	Ostrava, Czech Republic	16 years, 213 days	
Long jump	8.04 m (+1.8 m/s) (Note: Outdoor best; indoor mark ratified as absolute record.)	Mattia Furlani	Italy	5 July 2022	European U18 Championships	Jerusalem, Israel	17 years, 148 days	
Triple jump	16.65	Sergey Timofeyev	Soviet Union	27 April 1984		Adler, Soviet Union	16 years, 114 days	
Shot put (5 kg)	23.23 m	Krzysztof Brzozowski	Poland	23 August 2010		Singapore	17 years, 39 days	
Shot put (5.44 kg)								
Shot put (6 kg)	22.06 m	Konrad Bukowiecki	Poland	24 July 2014	World Junior Championships	Eugene, United States	17 years, 129 days	
Shot put (7.26 kg)	18.73 m	Karsten Stolz	Germany	2 September 1981		Essen, Germany	17 years, 41 days	
Discus throw (1.5 kg)	77.50 m	Mykyta Nesterenko	Ukraine	19 May 2008		Kyiv (Koncha Zaspa), Ukraine	17 years, 34 days	
Discus throw (1.75 kg)	70.13 m	Mykyta Nesterenko	Ukraine	24 May 2008		Halle (Saale), Germany	17 years, 39 days	
Discus throw (2 kg)	65.31 m	Mykyta Nesterenko	Ukraine	3 June 2008		Tallinn, Estonia	17 years, 49 days	
Hammer throw (5 kg)	87.82 m	Mykhaylo Kokhan	Ukraine	7 July 2018	European U18 Championships	Győr, Hungary	17 years, 166 days	
Hammer throw (6 kg)	79.68 m	Mykhaylo Kokhan	Ukraine	13 July 2018	World U20 Championships	Tampere, Finland	17 years, 172 days	
Hammer throw (7.26 kg)	73.66 m	Vladislav Piskunov	Ukraine	11 June 1994		Kyiv, Ukraine	16 years, 4 days	
Javelin throw (700 g)	84.52 m	Topi Parviainen	Finland	6 July 2022	European U18 Championships	Jerusalem, Israel	15 years, 281 days	
Javelin throw (800 g)	79.96 m	Aki Parviainen	Finland	12 September 1991		Pyhäselkä, Finland	16 years, 321 days	
Octathlon	6478 pts	Kévin Mayer	France	9 July 2009		Brixen, Italy	17 years, 149 days	
Octathlon	100m (wind) / Long jump (wind) / Shot put / 400m / 110m H (wind) / High jump / Javelin / 1000m; 11.31 (+1.1 m/s) / 7.24 m (±0.0 m/s) / 13.48 m / 50.56 / 14.43 (+0.7 m/s) / 2.04 m / 58.03 m / 2:41.22							
Decathlon (youth)	8002 pts	Niklas Kaul	Germany	15–16 July 2015	World Youth Championships	Cali, Colombia	17 years, 155 days	
Decathlon (youth)	100m (wind) / Long jump (wind) / Shot put / High jump / 400m / 110m H (wind) / Discus / Pole vault / Javelin / 1500m; 11.59 (−0.2 m/s) / 6.76 m (+1.1 m/s) / 16.08 m (5 kg) / 2.05 m / 51.20 / 15.44 (−0.7 m/s) (91.4 cm) / 44.09 m (1.5 kg) / 4.70 m / 78.20 m (700 g) / 4:42.29							
Decathlon (senior)	8104 pts h	Valter Külvet	Estonia	22–23 August 1981		Viimsi, Soviet Union	17 years, 185 days	
Decathlon (senior)	100m (wind) / Long jump (wind) / Shot put / High jump / 400m / 110m H (wind) / Discus / Pole vault / Javelin / 1500m; 10.7w h / 7.26 m w / 13.86 m / 2.09 m / 48.5 h / 14.8 h / 47.92 m / 4.50 m / 60.34 m / 4:37.8 h							
Decathlon (senior)	7829 pts	Valter Külvet	Estonia	12–13 September 1981		Stockholm, Sweden	17 years, 206 days	
Decathlon (senior)	100m (wind) / Long jump (wind) / Shot put / High jump / 400m / 110m H (wind) / Discus / Pole vault / Javelin / 1500m; 11.34 / 7.12 m / 14.10 m / 2.08 m / 49.65 / 15.24 / 48.02 m / 4.20 m / 59.90 m / 4:37.07							
5000 m walk (track)	19:47.00 (Note: Outdoor best; indoor mark ratified as absolute record.)	Yevgeniy Demkov	Russia	6 February 1999	Russian U18 Race Walking Championships	Adler, Russia	16 years, 65 days	
10,000 m walk (track)	40:15.1 h	Maris Putenis	Latvia	8 May 1999		Valmiera, Latvia	16 years, 332 days	
10 km walk (road)	39:09	Danila Martynov	Russia	5 September 2021		Voronovo, Russia	17 years, 127 days	
20,000 m walk (track)								
20 km walk (road)	1:22:49	Aleksandr Strokov	Russia	7 February 1999		Adler, Russia	16 years, 170 days	
50,000 m walk (track)	4:22:13.4	Bengt Simonsen	Sweden	19 October 1974		Gothenburg, Sweden	16 years, 210 days	
50 km walk (road)								
4 × 100 m relay								
4 × 400 m relay	3:12.05	Piotr Zrada; Piotr Kędzia; Karol Grzegorczyk; Mariusz Kowalski	Poland	5 August 2001		Kaunas, Lithuania	17 years, 60 days	
Swedish medley relay	1:50.46	Tomasz Kaska; Piotr Zrada; Piotr Kędzia; Karol Grzegorczyk	Poland	15 July 2001		Debrecen, Hungary	17 years, 39 days	

=== Girls ===
Event	Record	Athlete	Nationality	Date	Meet	Place	Age	Ref.
100 m	11.14 (+0.6 m/s)	Kelly Doualla	Italy	17 July 2026	European U18 Championships	Rieti, Italy	16 years, 239 days	
200 m	22.42 (+1.7 m/s)	Amy Hunt	Great Britain	30 June 2019	Mannheim Junior Gala	Mannheim, Germany	17 years, 46 days	
300 m	36.46	Linsey MacDonald	Great Britain	13 July 1980	Amoco International Invitational	London, United Kingdom	16 years, 152 days	
400 m	50.48	Grit Breuer	East Germany	22 July 1989		Neubrandenburg, East Germany	17 years, 156 days	
600 m	1:26.61	Audrey Werro	Switzerland	13 May 2021		Langenthal, Switzerland	17 years, 47 days	
800 m	1:57.86	Phoebe Gill	Great Britain	11 May 2024	Irish Milers Meet	Belfast, United Kingdom	17 years, 14 days	
1000 m	2:38.58	Josephine White	Great Britain	9 September 1977	IAC/Coca-Cola Meeting	London, United Kingdom	17 years, 246 days	
1500 m	4:06.02	Ana Padurean	Romania	28 June 1986		Pitesti, Romania	17 years, 54 days	
Mile	4:38.20	Annemari Sandell	Finland	8 June 1994		Turku, Finland	17 years, 157 days	
2000 m	5:48.47	Philippa Mason	Great Britain	11 July 1986	PTG/GP	London, United Kingdom	17 years, 117 days	
3000 m	8:48.28	Gabriela Szabo	Romania	20 September 1992		Seoul, South Korea	16 years, 311 days	
5000 m	15:26.33	Annemari Sandell	Finland	5 July 1993	DN Galan	Stockholm, Sweden	16 years, 184 days	
10,000 m	32:55.24	Annemari Sandell	Finland	8 July 1994		Tuusula, Finland	17 years, 187 days	
10 km (road)	33:29	Wilma Anna Bekkemoen Torbiörnsson	Norway	19 October 2024	Norwegian 10km Road Running Championships	Høle, Norway	17 years, 141 days	
Half marathon								
Marathon								
100 m hurdles (76.2 cm)	12.86 (+2.0 m/s)	Laura Frličková	Slovakia	18 July 2024	European U18 Championships	Banská Bystrica, Slovakia	17 years, 185 days	
100 m hurdles (76.2 cm)	12.86 (+0.5 m/s)	Alessia Succo	Italy	31 May 2026	Brixia Next Gen	Bressanone, Italy	17 years, 113 days	
100 m hurdles (84 cm)								
200 m hurdles	26.68	Sharon Colyear-Danville	Great Britain	16 July 1971		London, United Kingdom	16 years, 85 days	
400 m hurdles	55.19	Linda Botková	Czech Republic	19 July 2026	European U18 Championships	Rieti, Italy	16 years, 162 days	
2000 m steeplechase	6:07.72	Jolanda Kallabis	Germany	10 September 2022	SWT-Flutlichtmeeting	Trier, Germany	17 years, 204 days	
3000 m steeplechase	9:33.19	Karoline Bjerkeli Grøvdal	Norway	2 June 2007		Neerpelt, Belgium	16 years, 353 days	
High jump	1.96 m	Olga Turchak	Soviet Union	7 September 1984		Donetsk, Soviet Union	17 years, 186 days	
High jump	1.96 m	Angelina Topić	Serbia	26 June 2022	Serbian Championships	Kruševac, Serbia	16 years, 335 days	
High jump	1.96 m	Karmen Bruus	Estonia	19 July 2022	World Championships	Eugene, United States	17 years, 176 days	
Pole vault	4.52 m	Allika Inkeri Moser	Estonia	21 July 2025	European Youth Olympic Festival	Skopje, North Macedonia	17 years, 116 days	
Long jump	6.91 m (+1.0 m/s)	Heike Daute	East Germany	9 August 1981		Jena, East Germany	16 years, 236 days	
Triple jump	14.18 m (+1.6 m/s)	Aleksandra Nacheva	Bulgaria	15 July 2018	World U20 Championships	Tampere, Finland	16 years, 329 days	
Shot put (3 kg)	20.52 m	Corrie de Bruin	Netherlands	13 June 1993		Assen, Netherlands	16 years, 230 days	
Shot put (4 kg)	19.08 m	Ilke Wyludda	East Germany	9 August 1986		Karl-Marx-Stadt, East Germany	17 years, 134 days	
Discus throw	65.86 m	Ilke Wyludda	East Germany	1 August 1986		Neubrandenburg, East Germany	17 years, 126 days	
Hammer throw (3 kg)	78.16 m	Nova Kienast	Germany	13 December 2024		Mesa, United States	17 years, 142 days	
Hammer throw (4 kg)	68.18 m	Ivana Brkljačić	Croatia	28 April 2000		Pula, Croatia	17 years, 94 days	
Javelin throw (500 g)	70.10 m	Adriana Vilagoš	Serbia	14 August 2021	Balkan Youth Championships	Kraljevo, Serbia	17 years, 224 days	
Javelin throw (600 g)	62.36 m	Adriana Vilagoš	Serbia	14 September 2021	Hanžeković Memorial	Zagreb, Croatia	17 years, 255 days	
Heptathlon (youth)	6301 pts	Henriette Jæger	Norway	12–13 September 2020		Moss, Norway	17 years, 92 days	
Heptathlon (youth)	100m H (wind) / High jump / Shot put / 200m (wind) / Long jump (wind) / Javelin / 800m; 13.21 (+2.7 m/s) / 1.69 m / 14.69 m / 23.36 (+2.1 m/s) / 6.33 m (−1.3 m/s) / 35.71 m / 2:11.37							
Heptathlon (senior)	6293 pts	Jana Koščak	Croatia	27–28 May 2023	Hypo-Meeting	Götzis, Austria	17 years, 9 days	
Heptathlon (senior)	100m H (wind) / High jump / Shot put / 200m (wind) / Long jump (wind) / Javelin / 800m; 13.26 (+1.2 m/s) / 1.92 m / 12.42 m / 24.14 (+0.9 m/s) / 6.24 m (+1.3 m/s) / 41.03 m / 2:21.20							
3000 m walk (track)	12:18.86	Kate Veale	Ireland	23 July 2011	Juvenile Track and Field Championships of Ireland	Tullamore, Republic of Ireland	17 years, 199 days	
5000 m walk (track)	20:28.05	Tatyana Kalmykova	Russia	12 July 2007	World Youth Championships	Ostrava, Czech Republic	17 years, 183 days	
5 km walk (road)	20:27	Tatyana Kozlova	Russia	28 May 2000		Saransk, Russia	16 years, 269 days	
10,000 m walk (track)	44:24.43	Tatyana Kozlova	Russia	20 October 2000	World Junior Championships	Santiago de Chile, Chile	17 years, 48 days	
10 km walk (road)	43:28	Aleksandra Kudryashova	Russia	19 February 2006		Adler, Russia	15 years, 216 days	
20,000 m walk (track)								
20 km walk (road)	1:29:24	Anastasiya Kolchina	Russia	11 September 2022		Kostroma, Russia	17 years, 123 days	
50,000 m walk (track)	5:05:44.7 h	Tatyana Abramzeva	Russia	12 October 2003		Saint Petersburg, Russia		
4 × 100 m relay	44.05	Petra Koppetsch; Marlies Oelsner; Margit Sinzel; Christina Brehmer	East Germany	24 August 1975	European Junior Championships	Athens, Greece	17 years, 156 days 17 years, 177 days	
4 × 400 m relay	3:36.98	Janet Ravenscroft; Evelyn McMeekin; Ruth Kennedy; Susan Pettett	Great Britain	26 August 1973	European Junior Championships	Duisburg, Germany		
Swedish medley relay	2:04.57	Isabella Pastore; Margherita Castellani; Laura Frattaroli; Kelly Doualla	Italy	26 July 2025	European Youth Olympic Festival	Skopje, North Macedonia	15 years, 248 days	

== Indoor ==
=== Boys ===
Event	Record	Athlete	Nationality	Date	Meet	Place	Age	Ref.
60 m	6.68	Divine Iheme	Great Britain	3 February 2026	England U15/U17/U20 Championships	Sheffield, United Kingdom	16 years, 129 days	
200 m	20.66	Jake Odey-Jordan	Great Britain	10 March 2024	New Balance Nationals Indoor	Boston, United States	16 years, 79 days	
300 m	33.73	Thomas Somers	Great Britain	14 December 2013		Sheffield, United Kingdom	16 years, 230 days	
400 m	47.01	Lukáš Balcar	Czech Republic	22 February 2026		Ostrava, Czech Republic	15 years, 348 days	
800 m	1:48.78	Mevlüt Aras	Turkey	26 December 2021		Istanbul, Turkey	17 years, 300 days	
1000 m	2:24.13	Cian McPhillips	Ireland	17 December 2019	NIA Live	Dublin, Ireland	17 years, 193 days	
1500 m	3:45.21	Magnus Øyen	Norway	4 February 2024		Reykjavík, Iceland	16 years, 284 days	
2000 m	5:17.05	Lukas Buncic	Norway	7 December 2024	Låvefesten	Hvam, Norway	16 years, 346 days	
3000 m	7:59.30	Axel Vang Christensen	Denmark	16 January 2021	Skive European Championships Kvalifikation	Skive, Denmark	16 years, 170 days	
5000 m	14:18.42	Lukas Verzbicas	Lithuania	13 March 2009		Boston, United States	16 years, 66 days	
5000 m	14:06.55	Axel Vang Christensen	Denmark	31 December 2020		Randers, Denmark	16 years, 154 days	
50 m hurdles (91.4 cm)	6.66	Stéphane Caristan	France	25 January 1981		Paris, France	16 years, 239 days	
50 m hurdles (99/100 cm)								
50 m hurdles (106.7 cm)	6.96	Garfield Darien	France	21 February 2004		Aubière, France	16 years, 61 days	
60 m hurdles (91.4 cm)	7.48	Ladji Doucouré	France	23 January 2000		Eaubonne, France	16 years, 301 days	
60 m hurdles (106.7 cm)	7.75	Yves N'Dabian	France	5 December 1999		Eaubonne, France	16 years, 130 days	
High jump	2.24 m	Dmitry Kroyter	Israel	14 February 2010		Moscow, Russia	16 years, 361 days	
High jump	2.24 m	Danil Lysenko	Russia	6 December 2014	«The Climbing of Everest» meeting	Kineshma, Russia	17 years, 201 days	
Pole vault	5.60 m	Matvey Volkov	Belarus	12 February 2021	Orlen Cup	Łódź, Poland	16 years, 336 days	
Long jump	8.12 m	Viktor Kuznyetsov	Ukraine	20 December 2003		Brovary, Ukraine	17 years, 156 days	
Triple jump	16.34 m	Martin Lamou	France	27 February 2016	U20 Match Italy-France-Germany	Padua, Italy	16 years, 290 days	
Shot put (5 kg)	24.24 m	Konrad Bukowiecki	Poland	30 December 2014	Chasing the Record Meeting	Spała, Poland	17 years, 288 days	
Shot put (6 kg)	20.12 m	Henning Prüfer	Germany	2 March 2013	International U20 Match	Ancona, Italy		
Shot put (7.26 kg)	18.49 m	Yuriy Belonog	Ukraine	7 December 1991		Kyiv, Ukraine	17 years, 273 days	
Heptathlon (youth)	5910 pts (Note: Set while Russia were suspended by World Athletics)	Ranel Shafikov	Russia	22–23 December 2021		Kemerovo, Russia	17 years, 207 days	
Heptathlon (youth)	60m / Long jump / Shot put / High jump / 60m H / Pole vault / 1000m; 6.79 / 7.10 m / 14.53 m / 1.91 m / 7.75 / 5.00 m / 2:59.01							
Heptathlon (junior)	5371 pts	Maxime Moitie-Charnois	France	11–12 December 2021	Championnats Départementaux d’Épreuves Combinées	Miramas, France	17 years, 241 days	
Heptathlon (junior)	60m / Long jump / Shot put / High jump / 60m H / Pole vault / 1000m; 7.17 / 6.73 m / 12.98 m / 1.95 m / 8.21 / 4.35 m / 2:53.65							
Heptathlon (junior)	5510 pts (Note: Order of high jump and pole vault events switched)	Sam Talbot	Great Britain	9–10 January 2016	England Senior Open & U20 Combined Events Championships	Sheffield, United Kingdom	16 years, 327 days	
Heptathlon (junior)	7.00 (60 m), 7.51 m (long jump), 12.62 m (shot put), 3.82 m (pole vault) / 8.05 (60 m hurdles), 1.87 m (high jump), 2:44.60 (1000 m)							
Heptathlon (junior)	5592 pts h	Sven Reintak	Estonia	24–25 February 1980		Kharkiv, Soviet Union	16 years, 253 days	
Heptathlon (junior)	60m / Long jump / Shot put / High jump / 60m H / Pole vault / 1000m; 7.0 / 6.98 m / 13.79 m / 2.06 m / 8.2 / 4.80 m / 2:57.7							
Heptathlon (senior)								
Heptathlon (senior)	60m / Long jump / Shot put / High jump / 60m H / Pole vault / 1000m							
3000 m walk	11:44.2 h	Dmitri Gramachkov	Russia	6 January 2020		Chelyabinsk, Russia	16 years, 303 days	
11:30.0 h	Damir Yangayev	Russia	1 March 1998		Insar, Russia	16 years, 344 days		
5000 m walk	19:00.4	Sergey Shirobokov	Russia	30 December 2016		Saransk, Russia	17 years, 323 days	
4 × 200 m relay	1:29.09	LAV Rostock; Tom Laack; Marvin Anbuhl; Benjamin Schulz; Peter Tardel	Germany	10 December 2005		Neubrandenburg, Germany		
4 × 400 m relay								

=== Girls ===
Event	Record	Athlete	Nationality	Date	Meet	Place	Age	Ref.
60 m	7.19	Kelly Doualla	Italy	8 February 2025	Italian U18 Championships	Ancona, Italy	15 years, 80 days	
200 m	23.15	Irene Ekelund	Sweden	17 February 2013	National Championships	Norrköping, Sweden	15 years, 346 days	
400 m	53.38	Danijela Grgić	Croatia	5 February 2005	Vienna Indoor	Vienna, Austria	16 years, 130 days	
600 m	1:27.73	Aníta Hinriksdóttir	Iceland	19 December 2012		Reykjavík, Iceland	16 years, 341 days	
600 m	1:27.2 h	Ines Schimmel	East Germany	12 January 1980		Berlin, East Germany	16 years, 341 days	
800 m	2:00.73	Živa Remic	Slovenia	3 February 2026	Czech Indoor Gala	Ostrava, Czech Republic	16 years, 164 days	
1000 m	2:43.22	Aníta Hinriksdóttir	Iceland	15 December 2012	Aðventumót Ármanns	Reykjavík, Iceland	16 years, 337 days	
1500 m	4:11.70	Malin Ewerlöf-Krepp	Sweden	19 February 1989	European Championships	The Hague, Netherlands	16 years, 262 days	
2000 m	6:08.9 h	Daniela Fetcere	Latvia	27 January 2006		Riga, Latvia	15 years, 152 days	
3000 m	9:04.23	Snežana Pajkić	Yugoslavia	1 February 1987		Vienna, Austria	16 years, 131 days	
5000 m	16:53.77	Niamh O'Connor	Ireland	3 December 2016		Boston, United States	16 years, 288 days	
60 m hurdles (76.2 cm)	8.05	Alessia Succo	Italy	15 February 2026	Italian U18 Championships	Ancona, Italy	17 years, 8 days	
60 m hurdles (84 cm)								
High jump	1.96 m	Yaroslava Mahuchikh	Ukraine	22 December 2018		Minsk, Belarus	17 years, 94 days	
Pole vault	4.49 m	Lisa Gunnarsson	Sweden	17 February 2016	Globen Galan	Stockholm, Sweden	16 years, 181 days	
Long jump	6.61 m	Anu Kaljurand	Estonia	1 February 1986		Leningrad, Soviet Union	16 years, 291 days	
Triple jump	13.82 m	Yevgeniya Stavchanskaya	Ukraine	12 December 1998		Kyiv, Ukraine	17 years, 78 days	
Shot put								
Shot put (3 kg)	19.41 m	Emel Dereli	Turkey	15 December 2012		İzmir, Turkey	16 years, 294 days	
Pentathlon (youth)	4414 pts	Henriette Jæger	Norway	19 January 2020	Norwegian U18 Combined Events Championships	Hvam, Norway	16 years, 203 days	
Pentathlon (youth)	60m H / High jump / Shot put / Long jump / 800m; 8.30 / 1.72 m / 14.30 m / 5.85 m / 2:17.62							
Pentathlon (senior)	4432 pts	Jana Košcak	Croatia	4–5 February 2023	Tallinn Indoor Meeting	Tallinn, Estonia	16 years, 262 days	
Pentathlon (senior)	60m H / High jump / Shot put / Long jump / 800m; 8.21 / 1.82 m / 11.40 m / 6.34 m / 2:23.97							
3000 m walk (track)	12:05.6 h	Lyudmila Yefimkina	Russia	1 March 1998		Insar, Russia	16 years, 191 days	
4 × 200 m relay	1:38.77	SC Berlin; Anja Schmitz; Nadja Hack; Carola Otto; Silke Breckenfelder	Germany	17 February 1991		Dortmund, Germany		
4 × 200 m relay	1:38.77	Belgium Scholier; Imke Vervaet; Justien Grillet; Camille Laus; Kimberley Efonye	Belgium	20 February 2010	ADMB-Jeugdaflossingsmeeting	Ghent, Belgium	16 years, 315 days 16 years, 273 days	
4 × 400 m relay								
