= Alessia Succo =

Italian athlete (born 2009)

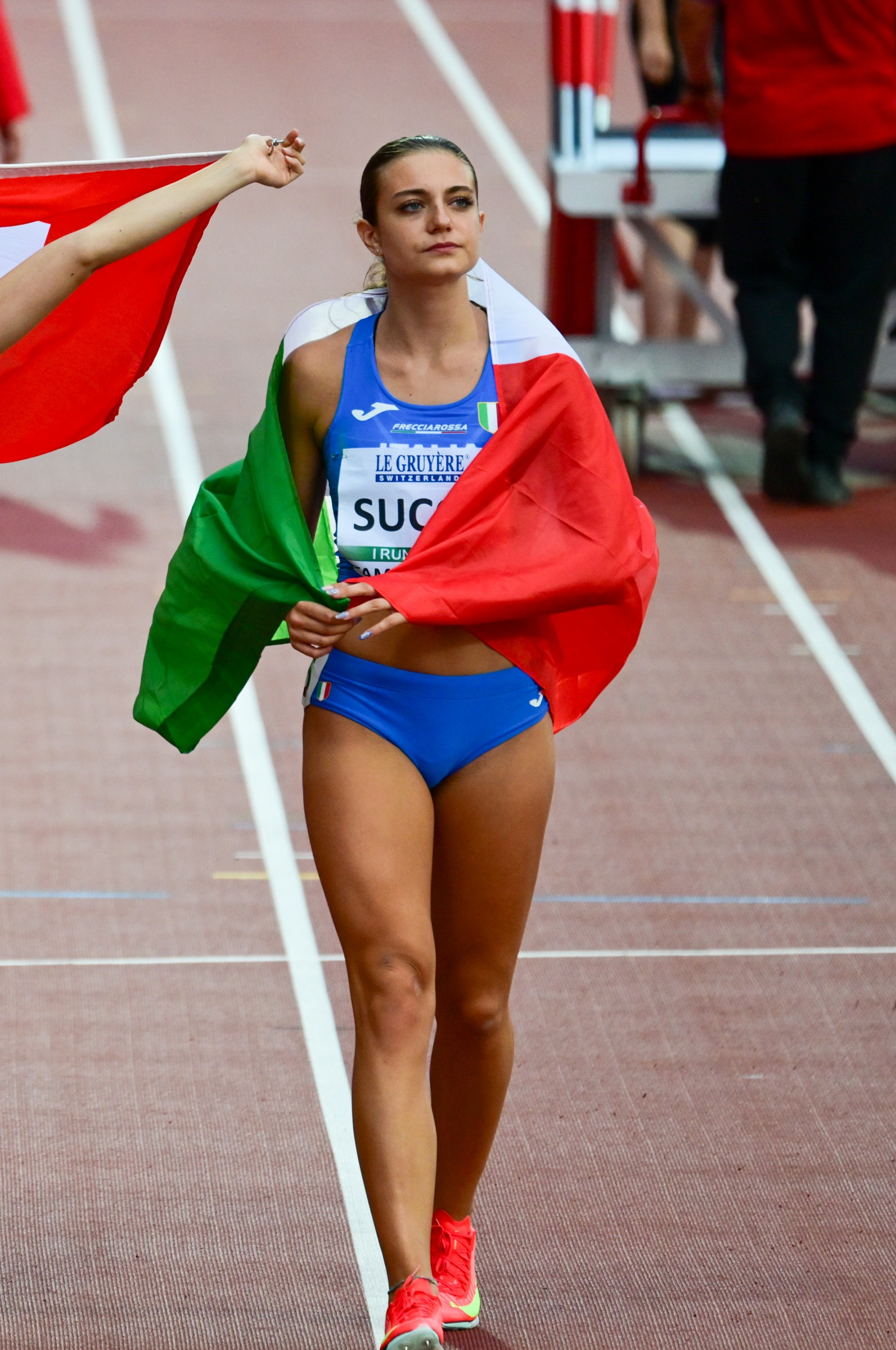
- Succo in 2025

Personal information
- Born: 7 February 2009 (age 17) Settimo Torinese, Italy
- Height: 1.75 m (5 ft 9 in)

Sport
- Sport: Athletics
- Event: Hurdles

Achievements and titles
- Personal bests: 60 m hs: 8.05 (2025); 100 m hs: 12.86 (2026) EU18B
Medal record
Women's athletics
Representing Italy
European U20 Championships
Bronze medal – third place	2025 Tampere	100 m hurdles
European U18 Championships
Silver medal – second place	2026 Rieti	100 m hurdles
European Youth Olympic Festival
Gold medal – first place	2025 Skopje	100 m hurdles
Gold medal – first place	2025 Skopje	Medley relay

Alessia Succo (born 7 February 2009) is an Italian sprint hurdler. She set a new world under-18 best for the 60 metres hurdles in 2026. She was a bronze medalist at the 2025 European Athletics U20 Championships in the 100 metres hurdles and equalled the European under-18 best in 2026.

== Biography ==
From Turin, she started training in athletic at the age of six years-old. She attended Einstein Scientific High School in Turin. She is a member of Atletica Settimese in Settimo Torinese.

Aged 15, she set a personal best for the 60 metres hurdles on January 25, 2025 of 8.19 seconds. As a 16 year-old, she set the U18 World Best in the 60m hurdles in 2025 of 8.07 seconds at the Italian under-18 indoor championships in Ancona, breaking the eight-year-old record set by Frenchwoman Cyréna Samba-Mayela, by three hundredths of a second.

Competing in the 100 metres hurdles, she won the gold medal in Skopje at the 2025 Summer European Youth Olympic Festival, with a new Italian under-18 record of 13.04 seconds over the junior-sized hurdles. Later at the Festival, she was also part of the gold medal winning Italian team in the Swedish relay, setting a new European age-group record, running the second leg alongside Kelly Doualla, Laura Frattaroli and Margherita Castellani. She was a bronze medalist at the 2025 European Athletics U20 Championships in the 100 metres hurdles in Tampere, Finland, in August 2025 despite being the youngest competitor in the final, running 13.32 seconds into a headwind (-1.5 m/s).

Succo improved her own U18 World Best to 8.05 at the Italian U18 Indoor Championships in Ancona in February 2026. On 1 March, she placed third in 8.08 seconds in the 60 metres hurdles at the senior Italian Indoor Athletics Championships in Ancona. On 20 May, she equalled her personal best, as well as her Italian U18 and U20 records, with 13.14 seconds for the 100m hurdles at the Savona International Meeting in Italy. Later that month, Succo equalled the European youth best in the 100m hurdles in Bressanone, running 12.86 seconds (+0.5) to tie the mark set by Laura Frlickova in 2024. On 4 June, she competed in the 100 hurdles at the 2026 Golden Gala in Rome, her debut in the Diamond League. Succo won the silver medal at the 2026 European Athletics U18 Championships in Rieti.
