= Natasza Dudek =

Polish long-distance runner (born 2010)

Personal information
- Born: 10 November 2010 (age 16)

Sport
- Sport: Athletics
- Events: Middle-distance running, Cross country running
Medal record
Women's athletics
Representing Poland
European U18 Championships
Silver medal – second place	2026 Rieti	3000m

Natasza Dudek (born 10 November 2010) is a Polish middle-distance and cross country runner.

== Biography ==
Based in the United States, Dudek attends Pioneer High School in Ann Arbor, Michigan. Her older sister, Zofia, also competes as a runner.

As a high-school sophomore, Dudek won the Michigan State Championships in a record time, before going on to win both the Nike Cross Nationals, and the Brooks XC Championships, to complete an unbeaten cross country season in 2025. In doing so, she was only the third sophomore to win either title, and the first high school girls runner to win both the Nike Cross Nationals and Brooks XC Championships in the same cross country season. She was named the 2025 MileSplit Coros Athlete of the Year. She was the National Player of the Year for Girls Cross Country in 2025.

In April 2026, she signed a Name, Image and Likeness (NIL) contract with Brooks Running. At the Brooks PR Invitational in June 2026, she placed third in the girls 2 mile race in 10:00.02. The following month, she won the Polish U18 national title over 3000 metres in Lubin. Dudek won the silver medal over 3000 metres at the 2026 European Athletics U18 Championships in Rieti, Italy, on 19 July 2026, running a Polish U18 record of 9:21.02 to finish behind a championship record run by Swiss athlete Aimie Decrausaz.
