= Sophia Akuchi Emmanuel =

Hungarian athlete (born 2010)

Personal information
- Born: 17 May 2010 (age 16)

Sport
- Sport: Athletics
- Event: Sprint
Medal record
Women's athletics
Representing Hungary
European U18 Championships
Silver medal – second place	2026 Rieti	400m

Sophia Akuchi Emmanuel (born 17 May 2010) is a Hungarian sprinter. In 2026, she became Hungarian national under-18 record holder in the 200 metres and 400 metres.

== Biography ==
Emmanuel is from the Budafok area of Budapest and trains as a member of Budafok MTE under coach Előd Bartha. In May 2026, she ran a Hungarian national under-18 record for the 200 metres with a time of 23.88 seconds. In July, she competed at the 2026 European Athletics U18 Championships in Italy, winning the silver medal in the final of the 400 metres behind Eleni Iakovaki of Greece. Her time was a personal best and national under-18 record of 52.80 seconds, which surpassed the previous best set by Éva Palanek in 1980. The following month, she ran a new Hungarian under-18 record over 200 metres of 23.49 seconds at the 2026 World Athletics U20 Championships in Eugene, United States. In September 2026, she was selected as part of the Hungary team to compete at the inaugural World Athletics Ultimate Championship in Budapest, running in the mixed 4 x 400 metres relay, as the Hungary team placed eighth overall.
