= Celine Obinna-Alo =

British sprinter

Personal information
- Born: 28 April 2010 (age 16)

Sport
- Sport: Athletics
- Event: Sprint
- Coached by: Richard Kilty

Achievements and titles
- Personal bests: 60m: 7.34 (2025); 100m: 11.45 (2026)
Medal record
Women's athletics
Representing Great Britain
European U18 Championships
| Bronze medal – third place | 2026 Rieti | 100m |

Celine Obinna-Alo (born 28 April 2010) is a British sprinter. In 2025, she set the British women's under-17 best time for the 60 metres.

== Early life ==
Born in Middlesbrough, and from Linthorpe, Obinna-Alo attends Venerable Bede Church of England Academy in Tyne and Wear.

== Career ==
Obinna-Alo is a member of Gateshead Harriers having joined the club at the age of 12 years-old, and has been trained by British Olympic medalist sprinter Richard Kilty since 2024.

In February 2025, Obinna-Alo became English indoor U17 champion over 60 metres, at the age of 14 years-old. In the final she ran 7.38 seconds, a championship record, 0.03 seconds outside Asha Philip’s British under-17 record.

In May 2025, she won the Loughborough International Athletics 100 metres race with a personal best time of 11.69 seconds. She placed second over 100 metres at the 2025 English Schools Championships in 11.86 seconds. In 2025, she became the youngest sportsperson in Britain to be signed by sportswear brand Nike. In December, still aged 15 years-old, she improved the British under-17 best for 60 metres, running 7.34 seconds at Lee valley breaking the previous record set by Asha Philip of 7.35 seconds in 2007. On 14 February 2026, she was a finalist over 60 metres at the senior 2026 British Indoor Athletics Championships in Birmingham, placing eighth overall.

Obinna-Alo was selected as a member of the Great Britain team for the 2026 European Athletics U18 Championships in Italy. On the opening day she completed her preliminary heat in a personal best of 11.45 seconds (+1.8), prior to winning the bronze medal in the final behind Kelly Doualla and Apostolia Antonatou, running 11.50 seconds. Later that year, she was nominated for British U20 Female Athlete of the Year by Athletics Weekly.
