= Mia Mireia Uusorg =

Estonian heptathlete (born 2007)

Personal information
- Born: 21 November 2007 (age 18)

Sport
- Sport: Athletics
- Event: Heptathlon
Medal record
Women's athletics
Representing Estonia
World U20 Championships
Silver medal – second place	2026 Eugene	Heptathlon

Mia Mireia Uusorg (born 21 November 2007) is an Estonian multi-event athlete. In 2026, she set a national under-20 record in heptathlon and won the silver medal at the 2026 World U20 Championships.

== Biography ==
From an athletics family, she started training from a young age. Both her father, Urmet Uusorg, and brother competed in athletics, with her father an Estonian national record holder and champion of middle-distance races.

In March 2023, she was runner-up to Viola Hambidge in the pentathlon at the U18 Baltic Team Championships. Alongside Hambridge, Pia Lauren Matsalu, and Miia Ott, she was part of the Estonian Swedish medley relay team which twice broke the Estonian age-group record at the 2023 Youth Olympic Festival in Maribor, placing fourth overall in the final. In July 2025, she ran alongside Hambidge in an Estonian medley relay team which set a new Estonian under-20 national record.

At the 2026 Baltic Championship in Valmiera in May 2026, she scored 6099 points in heptathlon setting a new Estonian under-20 national record. The tally also moved her seventh on the Estonian all-time list. She was selected to represent Estonia at the 2026 World Athletics U20 Championships in Eugene, United States, and won the silver medal in heptathlon on 6 August. She had moved up to third place overall prior to the final race over 800 metres, and was able to usurp Thea Brown of Great Britain, who finished the competition with a heavily strapped leg, into the silver medal position behind Enni Virjonen of Finland. That year, she committed to attend the University of Oregon in the United States.
