= Kelly Doualla =

Italian sprinter (born 2009)

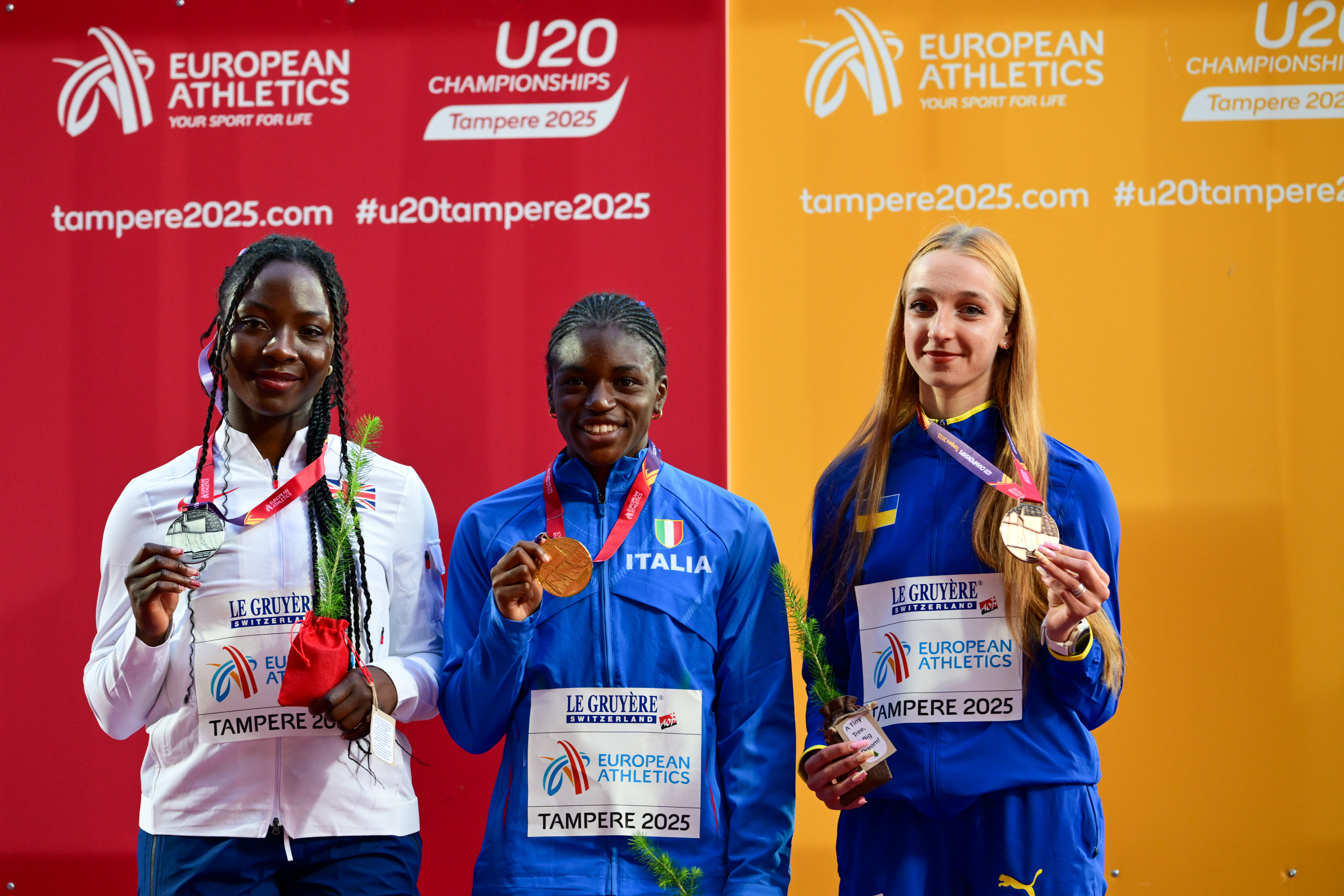
- Kelly Doualla in 2025

Personal information
- Full name: Kelly Ann Maevane Doualla Edimo
- Nationality: Italian
- Born: 20 November 2009 (age 17) Pavia, Italy

Sport
- Sport: Athletics
- Event: Sprinting
- Club: CUS Pro Patria Milan
- Coached by: Walter Monti

Achievements and titles
- Personal bests: 100 m: 11.14 AU18B (2026); 60 m (i): 7.19 AU18B (2025); Long jump: 6.42 (2025)
Medal record
Women's athletics
Representing Italy
World U20 Championships
Gold medal – first place	2026 Eugene	4×100 m mixed
Bronze medal – third place	2026 Eugene	100m
European U20 Championships
Gold medal – first place	2025 Tampere	100 m
Gold medal – first place	2025 Tampere	4x100 m relay
European U18 Championships
Gold medal – first place	2026 Rieti	100 m
Bronze medal – third place	2026 Rieti	Medley relay
European Youth Olympic Festival
Gold medal – first place	2025 Skopje	100 m
Gold medal – first place	2025 Skopje	Medley relay

Kelly Ann Maevane Doualla Edimo (born 20 November 2009) is an Italian sprinter. She has set European U18 best times for the 60 metres and 100 metres.

== Career ==
Doualla is a member of CUS Pro Patria Milan and trained by Walter Monti. By the age of 12 years-old, Doualla had run the outdoor 60 metres in 7.94 seconds.

=== 2024 ===
In February 2024, at the age of 14 years-old, she ran 7.27 seconds for the 60 metres. In April 2024, she ran the best time by an Italian in the under-16 age-group for the 80 meters, whilst competing in Pavia, Italy, with a run of 9.39 (+1.8 m/s). That month, she also recorded a run of 11.70 seconds for the 100 meters at the Italian Student Championships. In Pescara, Italy, in May 2024, she ran 11.52 for the 100 metres.

=== 2025 ===
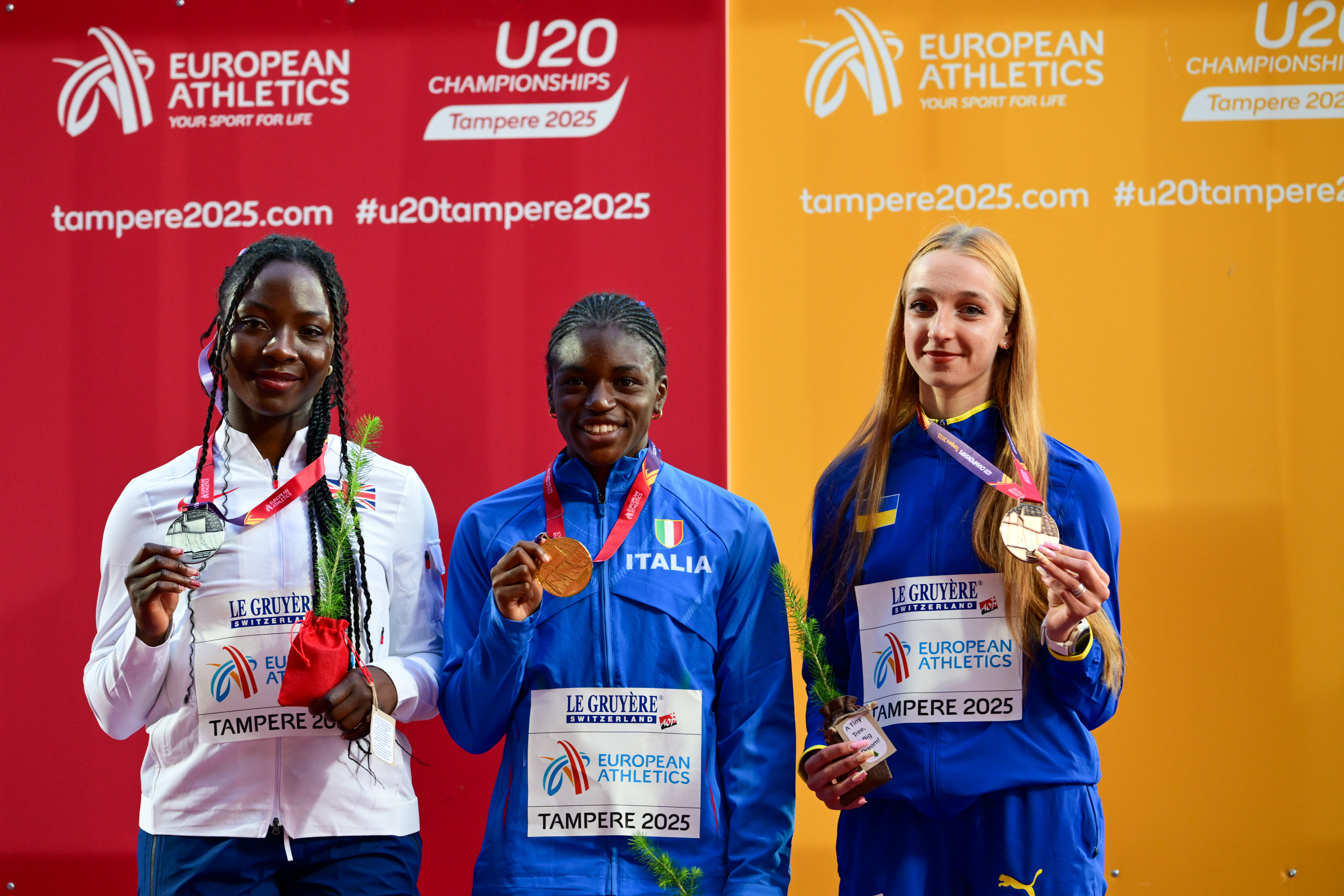
Podium of women's 100 m of Tampere 2025: Mabel Akande (silver), Kelly Doualla (gold), Uliana Stepaniuk (bronze).

She ran 7.23 seconds, the fastest ever 60 metres by a European U18, at the Memorial Giovannini, a World Athletics Indoor Tour Challenger meeting, in Ancona, Italy, on 18 January 2025. The previous European under-18 record was 7.24 seconds, by the Dutch sprinter N'Ketia Seedo. This also placed her fourth on the all-time senior Italian list behind only Zaynab Dosso, Marisa Masullo and Manuela Levorato. In Ancona, Italy on 8 February 2025, she ran in the final of the Campionati Italiani Allievi, registering a time of 7.19 seconds. Speaking after that race, the president of the Italian Athletics Federation, Stefano Mei, said there would be no pressure on Doualla to compete at the highest level given her young age saying "I don't choose the schedule if they [athlete and coach] decide they are ready to compete at the top level, I have no objections. And I don't have any demands, either."

On 21 July 2025, she won the 100 m race at 2025 European Youth Summer Olympic Festival in Skopje, with a new U18 European best of 11.21 seconds, breaking the record set by Jodie Williams in 2010. Later at the Festival, she was also part of the gold medal-winning Italian team in the Swedish relay, setting a new European age-group record, running the first leg alongside Alessia Succo, Laura Frattaroli and Margherita Castellani. At the age of 15 years-old, she was selected for the Italian team for the 2025 European Athletics U20 Championships in Tampere, Finland, winning her 100 metres semi final in 11.56 (-0.3 m/s) before winning gold in the final ahead of Mabel Akande of Great Britain with 11.22 (-0.1). She also anchored the Italian women's 4 × 100 m relay team to the gold medal. In 2025, Douala also experimented with the long jump, with a best jump of 6.42 metres. In September 2025, she was nominated for the European Athletics female rising star award.

=== 2026 ===
Doualla won the 60m title at the Italian U18 Championships in Ancona in February 2026. On 1 March, she placed second in 7.21 seconds in the 60 metres behind Zaynab Dosso at the senior Italian Indoor Athletics Championships in Ancona. She was selected for the 2026 World Athletics Indoor Championships in Toruń, Poland, in March 2026. The youngest competitor in the field and the youngest ever athlete to compete for Italy at the World Athletics Indoor Championships, she ran 7.27 in her heat to advance to the semifinals.

Doualla ran 11.14 seconds (0.6m/s) to win the gold medal at the 2026 European Athletics U18 Championships over 100 metres in Rieti, breaking her own European U18 best time to win ahead of Celine Obinna-Alo and Apostolia Antonatou. Later at the championship she ran the 200 metres as part of the Italian 1000 metres medley relay team, winning the bronze medal. On 6 August, she won the bronze medal in the final of the 100 metres race at the 2026 World Athletics U20 Championships in Eugene, United States. She was again nominated for European Athletics Women's Rising Star for 2026.

== Personal life ==
She was born in Pavia, Lombardy, to Cameroonian parents. She was reportedly given her name Kelly Ann in honour of the Jamaican sprinter Shelly-Ann Fraser-Pryce.

== Achievements ==
Year	Competition	Venue	Rank	Event	Time	Notes
2025	European U20 Championships	(Finland) Tampere	1st	100 m	11.22	
2025	European U20 Championships	(Finland) Tampere	1st	4 × 100 m relay	43.72	
2026	World Indoor Championships	(Poland) Torun	Semifinal	60 m	7.36	(Note: She ran a better crono, 7.27 in heat)
2026	European U18 Championships	(Italy) Rieti	1st	100 m	11.14	EU18B, WU18L
2026	European U18 Championships	(Italy) Rieti	3rd	Medley relay	2:07.43	
2026	World U20 Championships	(United States) Eugene	3rd	100 m	11.27	
2026	World U20 Championships	(United States) Eugene	1st	mixed 4 × 100 m relay	41.21	W20R (Note: She ran a crono of 10.17)
