= Eleni Iakovaki =

Greek athlete (born 2009)

Personal information
- Born: 15 April 2009 (age 17)

Sport
- Sport: Athletics
- Event: Sprint
Medal record
Women's athletics
Representing Greece
World U20 Championships
Bronze medal – third place	2026 Eugene	400m hurdles
European U18 Championships
Gold medal – first place	2026 Rieti	400m

Eleni Iakovaki (born 15 April 2009) is a Greek sprinter. She won the Greek Indoor Championships over 400 metres in 2026, and was the European under-18 champion that year in the 400 metres hurdles.

She was also a bronze medalist in the 400 metres hurdles at the 2026 World Athletics U20 Championships.

== Biography ==
The daughter of Greek European champion hurdler Periklis Iakovakis, her mother also competed in athletics.

In 2026, she won the Greek Indoor Athletics Championships over 400 metres in 53.95 seconds. Iakovaki went into the 2026 European Athletics U18 Championships as the European under-18 leader for the 400 metres with a time of 53.34 seconds, and won her preliminary heat. She subsequently won the final in a Greek U18 best of 52.38 seconds to win the gold medal ahead of Sophia Akuchi Emmanuel from Hungary. The time set new Greek records in both the under-18 and under-20 categories. She represented Greece at the 2026 World Athletics U20 Championships, winning the bronze medal in the 400 metres hurdles final in a Greek under-20 national record of 55.99 seconds. She was nominated for European Athletics Women’s Rising Star for 2026.
