= Emma le Blansch =

Dutch discus thrower (born 2009)

Personal information
- Born: 15 June 2009 (age 17)

Sport
- Sport: Athletics
- Events: Discus throw, Shot put
Medal record
Women's athletics
Representing Netherlands
European U18 Championships
Gold medal – first place	2026 Rieti	Shot put
Silver medal – second place	2026 Rieti	Discus throw

Emma le Blansch (born 15 June 2009) is a Dutch athlete who competes in the shot put and discus throw. She won the gold medal in the shot put and the silver medal in the discus throw at the 2026 European Athletics U18 Championships.

== Biography ==
From Zwaag in North Holland, she trained from a young age as a member of AV Hollandia. She also trained at Phanos for two years, before transitioned to also train Papendal to train with coach Corinne Nugter. She also studies at the Johan Cruyff Institute.

Competing at the 2026 European Athletics U18 Championships, le Blansch entered the championship with a personal best of 17.38 metres in the shot put and 51.65 metres in the discus throw, placing her fifth and sixth on the Dutch all-time list for under-18s. She qualified for the final of the discus throw. Later at the championships in Rieti, she threw multiple personal best distances to win the gold medal in the shot put with a final throw of 17.76 metres. The following day, le Blansch returned to the competition and won the silver medal in the discus throw final with a personal best distance of 53.54 metres. In November 2026, Le Blansch was awarded the Dafne Schippers Talent Award at the AFAS 125 Years of Athletics Dinner in Amersfoort.
