= 2026 World Athletics U20 Championships – Women's 400 metres hurdles =

Women's 400 metres hurdles at the 2026 World Athletics U20 Championships
- Venue: Hayward Field
- Dates: 6 August (Round 1); 8 August (Semi-finals); 9 August (Final)
- Competitors: 50
- Winning time: 55.33 AU20R

Medalists
gold medal	Alexandra Ștefania Uță	Romania
silver medal	Tumi Ramokgopa	South Africa
bronze medal	Eleni Iakovaki	Greece

The women's 400 metres hurdles at the 2026 World Athletics U20 Championships was held at Hayward Field in Eugene, United States on 6, 8 and 9 August 2026.

== Records ==
U20 standing records prior to the 2026 World Athletics U20 Championships were as follows:

Record	Athlete & Nationality	Mark	Location	Date
World U20 Record	Sydney McLaughlin (USA)	53.60	Fayetteville, United States	27 April 2018
Championship Record	Lashinda Demus (USA)	54.70	Kingston, Jamaica	19 July 2002
World U20 Leading	Linda Botková (CZE)	55.19	Rieti, Italy	19 July 2026

== Results ==
=== Round 1 ===
Round 1 took place in the morning session on 6 August 2026.

==== Heat 1 ====
Place	Lane	Athlete	Nation	Time	Notes
1	6	Alexandra Ștefania Uță	Romania	57.93	Q
2	5	Sydney Freeman	Canada	57.98	Q
3	7	Duru Iklim Kadanali	Turkey	58.05	Q
4	3	Marria Crossfield	Jamaica	58.22	Q, PB
5	8	Sofia Copiello	Italy	59.78	
6	1	Cristina Neves	Portugal	59.96	
7	4	Hope Edwards	Haiti	1:00.42	
8	9	Arianna Garcia	Dominican Republic	1:01.21	SB
9	2	Emily Montaño	Colombia	1:01.43	

==== Heat 2 ====
Place	Lane	Athlete	Nation	Time	Notes
1	9	Eleni Iakovaki	Greece	58.64	Q
2	8	Megan Nieman	South Africa	58.65	Q
3	3	Lynn Pöppelmann	Germany	58.74	Q
4	7	Benedetta Falleti	Italy	58.75	Q
5	2	Luana Cibele Sousa	Brazil	59.50	q
6	6	Mija MarušIč	Slovenia	59.72	
7	4	Tina Polić	Croatia	59.89	PB
8	5	Nina Čanecká	Slovakia	1:01.18	

==== Heat 3 ====
Place	Lane	Athlete	Nation	Time	Notes
1	3	Mariam Kareem	United Arab Emirates	57.87	Q
2	8	Shevaughn Thomas	Jamaica	58.36	Q, PB
3	6	Kei-Mahri Hanna	Bahamas	58.47	Q
4	7	Uyana Granger	Luxembourg	58.54	Q, NR
5	4	Ellis MC Hugh	Ireland	59.04	q
6	5	Ksenija Kozlova	Latvia	59.31	q, PB
7	9	Lena Bogdanović	Serbia	1:00.21	
8	2	Alba VIñals	Andorra	1:01.52	

==== Heat 4 ====
Place	Lane	Athlete	Nation	Time	Notes
1	4	Rania el Hamdaoui	Morocco	58.03	Q
2	3	Tumi Ramokgopa	South Africa	58.32	Q
3	9	Emma Juntunen	Finland	58.94	Q
4	2	Zarja ŽIžek	Slovenia	59.53	Q
5	1	Delia Ioana Aștefănoaie	Romania	1:00.34	
6	8	Hila Varsano	Israel	1:00.87	
7	7	Elisa Aguado	Chile	1:01.40	
8	5	Hanna Hirsbrunner	Switzerland	1:01.42	
9	6	Tatiana Díaz	Ecuador	1:04.92	

==== Heat 5 ====
Place	Lane	Athlete	Nation	Time	Notes
1	3	Rachel Gardner	Japan	58.50	Q
2	8	Lisa Frank	Switzerland	59.38	Q
3	2	Zoë van Gils	Netherlands	59.71	Q
4	9	Tatum Lynn	United States	59.94	Q
5	5	Tanu Chaudhary	India	1:00.03	
6	6	Kate Fink	Canada	1:01.34	
7	4	Douaa Labiadh	Tunisia	1:01.47	
8	7	Katka Mičániová	Slovakia	1:01.72	

==== Heat 6 ====
Place	Lane	Athlete	Nation	Time	Notes
1	9	Rebekka Feirle	Germany	57.89	Q
2	4	Natalie Dumas	United States	58.86	Q
3	8	Kyara Belfort	Brazil	59.37	Q
4	6	Shakira Harding	Australia	59.97	Q
5	3	Talyna Ligier	France	1:00.00	
6	2	Gal Natanel	Israel	1:00.80	
7	5	Ana Sokhadze	Georgia	1:01.32	
8	7	Michel Gómez	Colombia	1:01.87	

=== Semi-finals ===
Semi-finals took in the afternoon session on 8 August 2026.

==== Heat 1 ====
Place	Lane	Athlete	Nation	Time	Notes
1	7	Alexandra Ștefania Uță	Romania	56.87	Q
2	6	Rania el Hamdaoui	Morocco	57.36	Q, NU20R
3	5	Shevaughn Thomas	Jamaica	57.56 [.554]	Q, PB
4	4	Megan Nieman	South Africa	57.56 [.558]	
5	9	Emma Juntunen	Finland	57.61	PB
6	3	Benedetta Falleti	Italy	58.30	PB
7	1	Luana Cibele Sousa	Brazil	58.73	PB
8	8	Lynn Pöppelmann	Germany	59.27	
9	2	Zarja ŽIžek	Slovenia	59.29	

==== Heat 2 ====
Place	Lane	Athlete	Nation	Time	Notes
1	5	Tumi Ramokgopa	South Africa	56.80 [.792]	Q
2	7	Rebekka Feirle	Germany	56.80 [.797]	Q, PB
3	8	Kei-Mahri Hanna	Bahamas	57.55	Q
4	6	Rachel Gardner	Japan	57.80	
5	9	Kyara Belfort	Brazil	59.72	
6	2	Ksenija Kozlova	Latvia	59.81	
7	3	Uyana Granger	Luxembourg	1:00.10	
8	1	Shakira Harding	Australia	1:00.56	
9	4	Natalie Dumas	United States	1:11.76	

==== Heat 3 ====
Place	Lane	Athlete	Nation	Time	Notes
1	6	Mariam Kareem	United Arab Emirates	56.39	Q, NU20R
2	8	Duru Iklim Kadanali	Turkey	56.91	Q, NU20R
3	5	Eleni Iakovaki	Greece	57.10	Q, NU20R
4	7	Sydney Freeman	Canada	57.62	PB
5	2	Ellis MC Hugh	Ireland	58.49	PB
6	1	Tatum Lynn	United States	58.84	
7	9	Zoë van Gils	Netherlands	58.97	
8	3	Marria Crossfield	Jamaica	59.47	
—	4	Lisa Frank	Switzerland	DQ	TR17.3.3

=== Final ===
The final took place in the afternoon session on 9 August 2026.

Place	Lane	Athlete	Nation	Time	Notes
1st place, gold medalist(s)	7	Alexandra Ștefania Uță	Romania	55.33	PB
2nd place, silver medalist(s)	5	Tumi Ramokgopa	South Africa	55.88	PB
3rd place, bronze medalist(s)	3	Eleni Iakovaki	Greece	55.99	NU20R
4	6	Mariam Kareem	United Arab Emirates	56.27	NU20R
5	4	Rebekka Feirle	Germany	56.39	PB
6	9	Rania el Hamdaoui	Morocco	57.89	
7	2	Kei-Mahri Hanna	Bahamas	58.32	
8	7	Duru Iklim Kadanali	Turkey	58.32	
—	1	Shevaughn Thomas	Jamaica	DNF	
