= Alisa Launonen =

Finnish athlete (born 2010)

Personal information
- Nationality: Finnish
- Born: 4 February 2010 (age 16)

Sport
- Sport: Athletics
- Event: Heptathlon

Achievements and titles
- Personal bests: Heptathlon (U18): 6154 (Rieti, 2026) NU18R
Medal record
Women's athletics
Representing Finland
European U18 Championships
Gold medal – first place	2026 Rieti	Heptathlon

Alisa Launonen (born 4 February 2010) is a Finnish multi-event athlete. She won the gold medal in heptathlon at the 2026 European Athletics U18 Championships.

== Biography ==
From Naantali, she started training in athletics at the age of five years-old. Launonen won multiple-Finnish age-group titles in a range of athletics disciplines. She trained with Naantali Löyly before becoming a member of Turun Urheiluliitto, based in Turku.

Launonen was the pre-event favourite for the heptathlon at the 2026 European Athletics U18 Championships in Rieti, Italy, having set a world U18 leading total of 6011 points in Tampere. At the Championships, she won heptathlon events over 100 metres and 200 metres, going on to lead the overall standings after the first day ahead of German Svea Funck. She maintained her lead to win the gold medal on the second day, breaking the Finnish under-18 national record set by Launonen's club teammate Enni Virjonen by three points. On the concluding day of the championships, she also qualified for the final of the 100 metres hurdles, running 13.24 seconds in the semi-final. She placed fourth in the final with 13.21 seconds, the same time as the third-place finisher, Anna Peeters of France. She was nominated for European Athletics Women's Rising Star for 2026.
