= Alexandra Ștefania Uță =

Romanian athlete (born 2007)

Personal information
- Nationality: Romanian
- Born: 6 October 2007 (age 18) Râmnicu Vâlcea

Sport
- Sport: Athletics
- Event: Hurdles

Achievements and titles
- Personal bests: 400m hurdles: 55.55 (Tampere, 2025)
Medal record
Women's athletics
Representing Romania
World U20 Championships
Gold medal – first place	2026 Eugene	400m hurdles
European U20 Championships
Gold medal – first place	2025 Tampere	400 m hurdles
Bronze medal – third place	2023 Jerusalem	400 m hurdles
European Youth Olympic Festival
Silver medal – second place	2022 Banská Bystrica	400 m hurdles

Alexandra Ștefania Uță (born 6 October 2007) is a Romanian hurdler. She became national champion in the 400 metres hurdles for the first time in 2023 and retained the title in 2024. At the age of 16 years-old she was the youngest competitor at the 2024 European Athletics Championships. She won gold medals at the 2025 European U20 Championships and 2026 World Athletics U20 Championships.

== Early life ==
She started athletics at the age of 12 years-old. She was educated at Mircea cel Bătrân National College in Râmnicu Vâlcea.

== Career ==
She started training in athletics at the age of 12 years-old. She has dual registration at CS Vâlcea 1924 and CSM Onești athletics clubs. She trains in Râmnicu Vâlcea with coach Alina Enescu, the daughter of Viorica and Octavian Enescu, who trained 2004 Olympic medalist Ionela Tîrlea.

At the 2023 European Youth Olympic Festival in Maribor, Slovenia, she won the silver medal in the 400 metres hurdles and gold in the relay. She became Romanian senior champion in the 400 metres hurdles in 2023 at the age of 15 years-old. She was a bronze medalist in the 400 metres hurdles at the 2023 European Athletics U20 Championships in Jerusalem. At the age of 15 years-old she was the youngest athlete to win a medal at the Championships. She finished the 2023 season ranked first in the world for the under-18 400m hurdles and second in the world in the U20 400m hurdles.

In February 2024, she won the Balkan Athletics Indoor Championships 400 metres race in Istanbul, Turkey, in a time of 54.69 seconds. She competed at the 2024 European Athletics Championships in Rome where at the age of 16 years-old she youngest entrant to compete at the Championships. In June 2024, she retained her national 400m hurdles title.

She competed at the 2025 European Athletics U20 Championships in Tampere, Finland, qualifying fastest, winning her heat in 57.64 before reaching the final with 57.40. She set a new championship record of 55.55 seconds to win the gold medal in the final breaking the previous best set by Zuzana Hejnova in 2005. She placed seventh in the Diamond League event at the 2025 Kamila Skolimowska Memorial, in Poland, in the 400 metres hurdles on 16 August. In September 2025, she was nominated for the European Athletics female rising star award.

On 9 August, she won the gold medal in the 400 metres hurdles at the 2026 World Athletics U20 Championships in Eugene, USA.
