= Tito Odunaike =

British triple jumper (born 2009)

Personal information
- Born: 2 April 2009 (age 17)

Sport
- Sport: Athletics
- Event: Triple jump
- Coached by: David Johnson

Achievements and titles
- Personal bests: Triple jump: 16.12m (Mannheim, 2026) NU18B
Medal record
Men's athletics
Representing Great Britain
European U18 Championships
Gold medal – first place	2026 Rieti	Triple jump

Tito Odunaike (born 2 April 2009) is a British triple jumper. As a 16-year-old, he won the senior national triple jump title at the 2026 British Indoor Athletics Championships, before going on to win the 2026 European Athletics U18 Championships.

== Biography ==
From Milton Keynes, he is a member of Marshall Milton Keynes Athletic Club and a pupil at Harrow School. Odunaike was originally a long jumper and also played football and rugby before focusing on triple jump.

Odunaike won at the English Schools Championships in 2024 with a personal best 14.53 metres. In 2025, he jumped 15.65 metres to win at the English Schools Championships, moving to third on the British all-time under-17 list.

Odunaike won the England Athletics U20 indoor title in February 2026, improving his personal best multiple times on the day to 16.01 metres, a British under-18 best mark. The following week, he won the senior 2026 British Indoor Athletics Championships in Birmingham on 14 February 2026, winning with a best jump of 15.75 metres in the sixth and final round, cementing his lead in the competition. At the age of 16 years-old, he became the youngest ever male winner of a British Indoor Championships title, surpassing the record that had stood since Phil Brown in 1979. He set a new personal best in June at the Mannheim International Gala, with 16.12m in the triple jump. He won the gold medal in the triple jump as a member of the Great Britain team at the 2026 European Athletics U18 Championships in Rieti, Italy, with a championship record and equal personal best jump of 16.12 metres. He was also selected as part of the Great Britain team to compete at the 2026 World Athletics U20 Championships. He was nominated for European Athletics Men’s Rising Star for 2026. In October 2026, he was selected for the 2026/27 Olympic Futures Programme awarded by UK Athletics. The following month, he was nominated for British U20 Male Athlete of the Year by Athletics Weekly.
