= Bronson Hearn-Smith =

British sprinter

Personal information
- Born: 9 December 2009 (age 16)

Sport
- Sport: Athletics
- Event: Sprint

Achievements and titles
- Personal bests: 60 m: 6.81 (2026); 100 m: 10.42 (London, 2026); 200 m: 20.70 (Rieti, 2026)
Medal record
Men's athletics
Representing Great Britain
European U18 Championships
Gold medal – first place	2026 Rieti	200m

Bronson Hearn-Smith (born 9 December 2009) is a British sprinter. He won the gold medal over 200 metres at the 2026 European Athletics U18 Championships.

== Early life ==
Hearn-Smith is from Tiptree, near Colchester, Essex, and attended Thurstable School and later Colchester Sixth Form College.

== Career ==
Having been a member of Chelmsford Athletics Club, Hearn-Smith joined the Colchester Harriers athletics club. Initially a long jumper as well as a sprinter, he later focused on the sprint events. He is coached by Stephen Garnham, who previously worked with British sprinter Charlie Dobson at the club. He started sprinting at the age of eleven years-old, and by 2024 he was timed at 10.9 seconds for the 100 metres, which placed him second in this age-group in the United Kingdom.

The following year, he won the Essex schools sprint title and gathered attention on social media when videos of his sprinting went viral and he lowered his personal best to 10.65 seconds for the 100 metres. In August 2025, he was runner-up over 100 metres and 200 metres to Divine Iheme at the England Athletics U17 Championships in Birmingham, running 10.67 seconds (-0.6 m/ps) for the 100 metres and 21.40 seconds (+0.3) for the 200 metres, a personal best.

Hearn-Smith ran a personal best for the 200 metres of 20.95 seconds in June 2026. He was selected as a member of the Great Britain team for the 2026 European Athletics U18 Championships in Italy. On 18 July, he won the gold medal in the 200 metres at the championships, running a championship record 20.70 seconds from lane eight, surpassing the previous best set by fellow Briton Ethan Heggarty. The competition in Rieti marked his first journey outside the United Kingdom. In October 2026, he was selected for the 2026/27 Olympic Futures Programme awarded by UK Athletics. That month, he won Male Breakthrough Athlete of the Year at the Track and Field Inclusion (TAFi) Awards. The following month, he was nominated for British U20 Male Athlete of the Year by Athletics Weekly.

== Personal life ==
Known for his languid relaxed-looking running style, Hearn-Smith is unable to wear contact lenses and competes in glasses. In October 2026, Hearn-Smith signed with Matchroom Talent Agency run by boxing promoter Eddie Hearn.
