= 2026 World Athletics U20 Championships – Women's triple jump =

Women's triple jump at the 2026 World Athletics U20 Championships
- Venue: Hayward Field
- Dates: 8 August (Qualification); 9 August (Final)
- Competitors: 26 from 19 nations
- Winning distance: 13.91 m

Medalists
gold medal	Viktoria Angelova	Bulgaria
silver medal	Daria Vrînceanu	Romania
bronze medal	Ana Estrella de León	Spain

The women's triple jump at the 2026 World Athletics U20 Championships was held at Hayward Field in Eugene, United States on 6 and 9 August 2026.

== Records ==
U20 standing records prior to the 2026 World Athletics U20 Championships were as follows:

Record	Athlete & Nationality	Mark	Location	Date
World U20 Record	Tereza Marinova (BUL)	14.62 m	Sydney, Australia	25 August 1996
Championship Record	Tereza Marinova (BUL)	14.62 m	Sydney, Australia	25 August 1996
World U20 Leading	Viktoria Angelova (BUL)	13.98 m	Rieti, Italy	19 July 2026

== Results ==
=== Qualification ===
Qualification took place in the morning session on 8 August 2026. Athletes attaining a mark of at least 13.35 metres (Q) or at least the 12 best performers (q) qualified for the final.

==== Group A ====
Place	Athlete	Nation	Round			Mark	Notes
Place	Athlete	Nation	#1	#2	#3	Mark	Notes
1	Daria Vrînceanu	Romania	13.60 (+1.3 m/s)			13.60 m (+1.3 m/s)	Q, SB
2	Antonia Bronnert	Germany	13.21 (+1.3 m/s)	13.43 (+0.5 m/s)		13.43 m (+0.5 m/s)	Q
3	Ana Estrella de León	Spain	x	x	13.33 (+0.7 m/s)	13.33 m (+0.7 m/s)	q
4	Naida Calonge	Spain	x	13.16 (+1.2 m/s)	-	13.16 m (+1.2 m/s)	q
5	Elisa Valenti	Italy	12.51 (+1.0 m/s)	12.68 (−0.3 m/s)	13.07 (+0.5 m/s)	13.07 m (+0.5 m/s)	q
6	Viktoria Angelova	Bulgaria	12.71 (±0.0 m/s)	12.76 (−0.4 m/s)	13.03 (+0.3 m/s)	13.03 m (+0.3 m/s)	q
7	Amayelle Sy de Vaucher	France	12.54 (+0.8 m/s)	13.02 (+0.4 m/s)	13.00 (+0.9 m/s)	13.02 m (+0.4 m/s)	q
8	D'Anna Cotton	United States	x	x	12.99 (−0.4 m/s)	12.99 m (−0.4 m/s)	
9	Ella Alvelin Malm	Sweden	12.85 (+1.1 m/s)	x	12.62 (+1.6 m/s)	12.85 m (+1.1 m/s)	
10	Qi-Chi Ukpai	Great Britain	x	x	12.79 (+1.7 m/s)	12.79 m (+1.7 m/s)	
11	Brenda Džiliana Apsīte	Latvia	x	x	12.74 (−0.2 m/s)	12.74 m (−0.2 m/s)	
12	Stela Ćuk	Serbia	12.72 (+0.1 m/s)	12.65 (+0.7 m/s)	x	12.72 m (+0.1 m/s)	
13	Lotta Edzards	Germany	12.68 (+0.5 m/s)	12.66 (+0.7 m/s)	12.66 (−0.2 m/s)	12.68 m (+0.5 m/s)	

==== Group B ====
Place	Athlete	Nation	Round			Mark	Notes
Place	Athlete	Nation	#1	#2	#3	Mark	Notes
1	Johanna Sundén	Sweden	x	x	13.58 (+0.5 m/s)	13.58 m (+0.5 m/s)	Q, PB
2	Solveig Zola	France	13.06 (+0.3 m/s)	13.05 (+0.8 m/s)	13.17 (+1.9 m/s)	13.17 m (+1.9 m/s)	q
3	ika Jordan Cujnik	Slovenia	13.13 (+1.5 m/s)	12.79 (+1.6 m/s)	x	13.13 m (+1.5 m/s)	q
4	Shi'eana Hall	United States	12.91 (±0.0 m/s)	12.18 (±0.0 m/s)	13.00 (±0.0 m/s)	13.00 m (±0.0 m/s)	q
5	Karine Martins	Brazil	12.99 (+1.0 m/s)	x	12.50 (+1.9 m/s)	12.99 m (+1.0 m/s)	q
6	Eylül Dönmez	Turkey	12.33 (+1.3 m/s)	x	12.94 (+2.8 m/s)	12.94 m (+2.8 m/s)	
7	Vivienne Kreuzer	Switzerland	12.52 (+0.6 m/s)	x	12.86 (+2.2 m/s)	12.86 m (+2.2 m/s)	
8	Zaria Kaličanin	Serbia	x	x	12.84 (+1.5 m/s)	12.84 m (+1.5 m/s)	
9	Anzhelina Petkova	Bulgaria	x	12.54 (+1.0 m/s)	12.80 (−0.1 m/s)	12.80 m (−0.1 m/s)	
10	Despoina Pasiou	Greece	12.41 (+1.1 m/s)	12.73 (+0.3 m/s)	12.78 (+0.2 m/s)	12.78 m (+0.2 m/s)	
11	Seannah Parsons	Trinidad and Tobago	12.68 (+0.7 m/s)	x	x	12.68 m (+0.7 m/s)	
12	Hala Khadidja Mefti	Algeria	x	x	12.31 (+0.9 m/s)	12.31 m (+0.9 m/s)	
13	Paola del Real	Mexico	x	x	13.04 (−0.3 m/s)	DQ	TR7.1

=== Final ===
The final took place in the afternoon session on 9 August 2026.

Place	Athlete	Nation	Round						Mark	Notes
Place	Athlete	Nation	#1	#2	#3	#4	#5	#6	Mark	Notes
1st place, gold medalist(s)	Viktoria Angelova	Bulgaria	x	12.75 (−1.2 m/s)	13.14 (−1.3 m/s)	13.05 (−2.6 m/s)	13.06 (−0.3 m/s)	13.91 (−1.9 m/s)	13.91 m (−1.9 m/s)	
2nd place, silver medalist(s)	Daria Vrînceanu	Romania	x	13.70 (+0.3 m/s)	12.83 (−1.5 m/s)	13.58 (±0.0 m/s)	12.77 (−0.7 m/s)	13.69 (+1.0 m/s)	13.70 m (+0.3 m/s)	SB
3rd place, bronze medalist(s)	Ana Estrella de León	Spain	13.20 (−1.8 m/s)	13.34 (−0.3 m/s)	13.33 (−1.3 m/s)	x	13.48 (−0.7 m/s)	13.58 (−1.4 m/s)	13.58 m (−1.4 m/s)	SB
4	Antonia Bronnert	Germany	13.08 (−0.6 m/s)	13.17 (±0.0 m/s)	x	13.34 (−0.8 m/s)	13.40 (−0.1 m/s)	x	13.40 m (−0.1 m/s)	
5	Naida Calonge	Spain	x	13.20 (−0.1 m/s)	13.34 (±0.0 m/s)	12.98 (−0.4 m/s)	x	13.18 (−0.6 m/s)	13.34 m (±0.0 m/s)	
6	Elisa Valenti	Italy	13.05 (−0.7 m/s)	12.95 (−1.8 m/s)	13.28 (+0.9 m/s)	x	13.28 (−0.5 m/s)	13.23 (−0.7 m/s)	13.28 m (+0.9 m/s)	PB
7	Amayelle Sy de Vaucher	France	13.09 (+0.5 m/s)	13.07 (−0.3 m/s)	x	x	x	12.57 (+0.8 m/s)	13.09 m (+0.5 m/s)	
8	Nika Jordan Cujnik	Slovenia	12.96 (+0.4 m/s)	13.07 (+0.1 m/s)	12.69 (+1.1 m/s)	12.69 (−0.5 m/s)	12.96 (−1.1 m/s)		13.07 m (+0.1 m/s)	
9	Karine Martins	Brazil	12.63 (+0.1 m/s)	12.80 (−0.8 m/s)	12.80 (−0.2 m/s)	x			12.80 m (−0.8 m/s)	
10	Shi'eana Hall	United States	12.53 (−0.5 m/s)	12.67 (−1.8 m/s)	12.75 (−1.1 m/s)	11.69			12.75 m (−1.1 m/s)	
11	Solveig Zola	France	12.45 (−0.4 m/s)	x	12.73 (−1.8 m/s)				12.73 m (−1.8 m/s)	
—	Johanna Sundén	Sweden	x	x	x				NM	
