= Viktoria Angelova =

Bulgarian triple jumper (born 2009)

Personal information
- Born: 25 April 2009 (age 17)

Sport
- Sport: Athletics
- Events: Long jump, Triple jump
- Coached by: Georgi Pomashki
Medal record
Women's athletics
Representing Bulgaria
World U20 Championships
| Gold medal – first place | 2026 Eugene | Triple jump |
European U18 Championships
| Gold medal – first place | 2026 Rieti | Triple jump |

Viktoria Angelova (born 25 April 2009) is a Bulgarian long jumper and triple jumper. She won gold medals in the triple jump at both the 2026 World U20 Championships and 2026 European U18 Championships.

== Biography ==
Angelova trains in Greece with coach Georgi Pomashki. She won the gold medal in the triple jump at the 2026 European Athletics U18 Championships in Rieti, Italy, with a championship record setting jump of 13.98m, in only her fifth triple jump competition. It added 40 centimetres to her personal best at the discipline. The jump also moved her to eleventh in the Bulgarian all-time list. In August, she represented Bulgaria at the 2026 World Athletics U20 Championships in the United States. She was named European Athletics Women’s Rising Star for 2026.
