= Enni Virjonen =

Finnish athlete (born 2007)

Personal information
- Nationality: Finnish
- Born: 14 May 2007 (age 19)

Sport
- Sport: Athletics
- Event: Heptathlon

Achievements and titles
- Personal bests: Heptathlon: 6214 (Eugene, 2026)
Medal record
Women's athletics
Representing Finland
World U20 Championships
Gold medal – first place	2026 Eugene	Heptathlon
European U20 Championships
Bronze medal – third place	2025 Tampere	Heptathlon
European U18 Championships
Gold medal – first place	2024 Banska Bystrica	Heptathlon
European Youth Olympic Festival
Bronze medal – third place	2023 Maribor	Heptathlon

Enni Virjonen (born 14 May 2007) is a Finnish multi-event athlete. She won the pentathlon at the Finnish Indoor Athletics Championships in 2026. She was the 2026 World U20 champion and 2024 European U18 champion in heptathlon.

== Biography ==
In July 2023, Virjonen won the bronze medal in the heptathlon at the 2023 European Youth Summer Olympic Festival in Maribor, Slovenia, scoring a personal best tally of 5633 points. The following year, she won gold in the heptathlon at the 2024 European Athletics U18 Championships in Slovakia. Her score of 6151 points set a Finnish under-18 national record, a record that stood until broken by club teammate Alisa Launonen at the same event in 2026.

Virjonen won the heptathlon at the 2025 Nordic Combined Events U20 Championships in June 2025. The following month, she won the bronze medal behind Jana Koščak of Croatia and Sarolta Kriszt of Hungary in the heptathlon at the 2025 European Athletics U20 Championships in Tampere, Finland, scoring 6060 points for a personal best, and her first time over 6000 points.

On 1 March 2026, she won the pentathlon with a tally of 4450 points at the Finish Indoor Championships in Espoo. In May, Virjonen set a lifetime best of 6189 points to finish thirteenth overall at the Hypo-Meeting in Götzis, and was named 'Rookie of the Year'. She won the gold medal at the 2026 World Athletics U20 Championships in Eugene, United States with 6214 points. It was the highest winning score in the event since Niamh Emerson in 2018.
