= 2026 World Athletics U20 Championships – Women's heptathlon =

Women's heptathlon at the 2026 World Athletics U20 Championships
- Venue: Hayward Field
- Dates: 5 August 2026; 6 August 2026
- Competitors: 24 from 14 nations
- Winning points: 6214

Medalists
gold medal	Enni Virjonen	Finland
silver medal	Mia Mireia Uusorg	Estonia
bronze medal	Anna Pfister	Switzerland

The women's heptathlon at the 2026 World Athletics U20 Championships was held at Hayward Field in Eugene, United States on 5 and 6 August 2026.

== Records ==
U20 standing records prior to the 2026 World Athletics U20 Championships were as follows:

Record	Athlete & Nationality	Mark	Location	Date
World U20 Record	Carolina Klüft (SWE)	6542	Munich, Germany	10 August 2002
Championship Record	Carolina Klüft (SWE)	6470	Kingston, Jamaica	20 July 2002
World U20 Leading	Enni Virjonen (FIN)	6189	Götzis, Austria	31 May 2026

== Results ==
The highest mark recorded in each event is highlighted in yellow

Place	Athlete	Nation	100m H	HJ	SP	200m	LJ	JT	800m	Pointss	Notes
1st place, gold medalist(s)	Enni Virjonen	Finland	13.36	1.66	14.35 PB	23.99	6.29	43.65	2:17.25	6214	WU20L
2nd place, silver medalist(s)	Mia Mireia Uusorg	Estonia	13.71 PB	1.63	11.33 PB	24.27	6.23	45.30	2:13.90 PB	5961	
3rd place, bronze medalist(s)	Anna Pfister	Switzerland	14.47	1.75 PB	12.61 PB	25.57	5.79	47.17 PB	2:14.95	5850	PB
4	Thea Brown	Great Britain	13.23 CHB	1.78	11.85 PB	24.45	6.39 SB	35.46 PB	2:34.10	5826	PB
5	Natacha Candé	Portugal	13.67 PB	1.78	12.96	25.11	5.76	38.15	2:23.03	5773	
6	Maria Schnemilich	Germany	13.89	1.75 PB	10.79 PB	25.01 SB	5.72	41.14	2:18.84 SB	5670	PB
7	Ísold Sævarsdóttir	Iceland	14.15	1.69 PB	12.13	25.46	5.61	38.30 SB	2:09.60 PB	5651	PB
8	Nikola Bunde	Latvia	13.81 PB	1.69 SB	12.10 PB	24.84	5.87	35.08	2:23.02	5583	
9	Norina Hug	Switzerland	14.61	1.69 PB	12.49	25.71	5.60	43.50	2:17.16 PB	5580	
10	Lalie Pouzancre-Hoyer	France	14.19	1.75	10.13	25.24	6.16 SB	30.80	2:18.99	5499	
11	Meike Huistra	Netherlands	14.05 PB	1.66	12.23 PB	25.19 PB	5.80	36.16	2:24.14 PB	5473	PB
12	Julia Dokter	Netherlands	14.29 PB	1.72	12.70 PB	25.45 PB	5.78	31.08	2:21.91	5448	
13	Zuzanna Kozan	Poland	14.17 PB	1.69	10.93 PB	25.13	5.81	37.03	2:23.43	5442	
14	Adriana Reitmane	Latvia	14.53	1.69 PB	11.51	25.87	5.71 SB	37.50	2:22.25	5359	
15	Elenor Servatius	Germany	14.35 SB	1.69 SB	10.96	26.06	5.60	41.32	2:27.72	5299	
16	Chiora Enyinna-Okeigbo	United States	14.00 SB	1.69	10.33 PB	25.32	5.68	31.61	2:21.64	5290	
17	Isabella Wing	Australia	14.13	1.57	11.20 PB	25.47	5.70	35.85	2:31.31	5137	
18	Bailey Van Den Broek	Australia	14.64	1.66	12.67	25.56	5.57	32.08	2:38.68	5062	
19	Destiny Look	United States	14.56 SB	1.63	10.08 PB	25.67	5.61	33.19	2:30.96	4983	
20	Nuppu Willman	Finland	14.76	1.81 PB	10.65	27.12	5.57	36.09	2:46.92	4947	
21	Annika Põlluaas	Estonia	14.23	1.63	10.79	25.67	NM	43.20	2:24.50	4616	
22	Matilda Quick	Great Britain	14.39	1.69	11.88	26.11	3.57	33.29 PB	2:33.34	4612	
	Rita Manfredini	Italy	14.86	1.54	9.04	DNF	NM	29.98	DNS	DNF	
	Zola Ndouma-Mona	France	13.41	1.72	14.72 CHB	25.02	DNF				
