= Laura Frličková =

Slovak athlete (born 2007)

Personal information
- Nationality: Slovak
- Born: 15 January 2007 (age 19) Martin, Slovakia
- Height: 166 cm (5 ft 5 in)
- Weight: 50 kg (110 lb)

Sport
- Sport: Track and Field
- Event: Hurdles
- Club: AK ZŤS Martin
- Coached by: Ľuboš Komárek

Achievements and titles
- Personal best: 100m hurdles (76.2cm): 12.86 (2024, AU18B)
Medal record
Women's athletics
Representing Slovakia
European U18 Championships
Gold medal – first place	2024 Banská Bystrica	100 m hurdles

Laura Frličková (born 15 January 2007) is a Slovak hurdler. She became Slovakia’s first ever gold medalist at the European Athletics U18 Championships in the 100 metres hurdles in 2024. She is also the holder of the European youth best in her event, having finished in 12.86 seconds during those same championships.

== Biography ==
Frličková was born on 15 January 2007 in Martin. Her first international event was the 2022 European Youth Summer Olympic Festival in Banská Bystrica, where she finished 17th in the 100m hurdles. A year later she placed 7th in the same category at the 2023 European Youth Summer Olympic Festival in Maribor. As a child she competed in modern gymnastics but changed to athletics because she found her former sport too slow.

Frličková competed at the Slovak Youth Athletics Championships in June 2024, setting a new national youth record in the heats with a time of 13.37 seconds. In the final she improved further, running the fastest female under-18 time of the year with a finish of 13.14 seconds to top the podium. At the same championships, she raced in the 200 metres, winning the final of that event just one-hundredth of a second ahead of the next-placed athlete.

Frličková won Slovakia’s first ever gold medal at the European Athletics U18 Championships in the 100 metres hurdles at the 2024 European Athletics U18 Championships with the time 12.97 seconds after having set a new European youth best with a time of 12.86 seconds in the heats.

At Slovakia's Athlete of the Year awards ceremony held in November 2024, Frličková won two awards, being named Young Female Athlete of the Year as well as Discovery of the Year. In addition, her coach Ľuboš Komárek was named Coach of the Year.

== Personal life ==
Frličková's athletic idol is the fellow Slovak hurdler Viktória Forster. She met and trained with Forster in October 2024 in the High Tatras. She hopes to qualify for the 2028 Summer Olympics.
