= Topi Parviainen =

Finnish athlete (born 2006)

Personal information
- Born: 28 September 2006 (age 20)

Sport
- Sport: Athletics
- Event: Javelin throw

Achievements and titles
- Personal best: Javelin throw: 81.91 (2026)
Medal record
Men's athletics
Representing Finland
European U18 Championships
Gold medal – first place	2022 Jerusalem	Javelin throw

Topi Parviainen (born 28 September 2006) is a Finnish javelin thrower. He was European U18 champion in 2022 as a 15 year-old and made his senior major championships debut as a 19 year-old at the 2026 European Athletics Championships, placing eighth overall.

== Biography ==
From Tuupovaara, both Topi and his brother Aku compete in the javelin throw after being introduced to the sport at an early age. He is the nephew of Finnish record holder Aki Parviainen.

At the age of 15 years-old, Parviainen set a European U18 best of 84.52m to win the javelin at the 2022 European Athletics U18 Championships in Jerusalem.

Parviainen broke the 80 metre-barrier for the first time in May 2026 with the senior javelin with a throw of 81.91m in Vantaa. He was a finalist as a 19 year-old on his senior major championship debut for Finland at the 2026 European Athletics Championships in Birmingham, England, placing eighth overall with a best throw in the final on 15 August of 77.82 metres.
