= Niamh O'Connor =

Irish writer and journalist

Niamh O’Connor
- Born: Ireland
- Occupation: Writer
- Writing career
- Pen name: Niamh O’Connor
- Genre: Crime

Niamh O’Connor is an Irish crime novelist, true crime writer and journalist.

== Life and work ==
Wicklow based writer O'Connor is a journalist for the Sunday World. She is the True crime editor there. She has also produced best selling books of high-profile crimes as well as Detective fiction with the central character of DI Jo Birmingham.

== Bibliography ==
=== Non fiction ===
- The Black Widow (The O’Brien Press 2000)
- Cracking Crime (The O’Brien Press 2001)
- Blood Ties (Transworld 2009)
- I'm Sorry Sir (2015)

Plus seven stories of True Crime published by The Sunday World 2007 – 2013

=== Fiction ===
- If I Never See You Again (Transworld 2010)
- Taken (Transworld 2011)
- Too Close For Comfort (Transworld 2012)
- Blink (Transworld 2013)
