= Aimie Decrausaz =

Swiss middle-distance runner (born 2010)

Personal information
- Born: 5 June 2010 (age 16)

Sport
- Sport: Athletics
- Events: Middle-distance running, Triathlon
Medal record
Women's athletics
Representing Switzerland
European U18 Championships
Gold medal – first place	2026 Rieti	3000m

Aimie Decrausaz (born 5 June 2010) is a Swiss middle-distance runner and triathlete. She won the gold medal over 3000 metres at the 2026 European Athletics U18 Championships.

== Biography ==
From Champvent, she is a member of Triathlon club Yverdon-les-Bains and excelled in triathlon from a young age, especially excelling in the running element of the discipline. In 2024 she was the Swiss age-group champion in the 1000m both indoors and outdoors, and became the all-time record holder in her age group for the Lausanne 4km. She was also the 2024 Swiss triathlon champion in the under-16 girls' category. She is coached by Gilles Vaucher and attends Auguste-Piccard Gymnasium.

In March 2026, she competed in her first ever 5km race as a 15-year-old in Payerne. Her finishing time of 15:37 surpassed the previous Swiss U23 record (16:28), was 1:26 faster than the previous Swiss under-20 record, and only three seconds away from Chiara Scherrer's senior national record. As a 15 year-old, in April of that year, she broke the junior record for the Lausanne 20KM by 47 seconds, her time of 12:38 over 4 km even bettered the boys' junior record by 2 seconds.

Decrausaz ran a championship record 9:06.60 to win the gold medal over 3000 metres at the 2026 European Athletics U18 Championships in Rieti, Italy.
