= 2026 European Athletics U18 Championships =

European athletics competition

5th European Athletics U18 Championships
- Dates: 16–19 July 2026
- Host city: Rieti, Italy
- Venue: Stadio Raul Guidobaldi
- Level: U18
- Type: Outdoor
- Events: 40
- Participation: 1104 athletes from 48 nations

The 2026 European Athletics U18 Championships was the fifth edition of the biennial continental athletics competition for European athletes aged fifteen to seventeen. It was held in Rieti, Italy from 16 to 19 July 2026 at the Stadio Raul Guidobaldi.

== Medal summary ==
Legend

- CR (Championship Record), PB (Personal Best; =PB: repeat/reconfirm Personal Best), SB (Season Best), WU18L (World U18 Lead), EU18L (European U18 Lead), EU18B (European U18 Best Performance/Record), 'NU18B' (National U18 Best Performance/Record)

=== Men ===
Event	Gold		Silver		Bronze	
100 metres Wind: (+0.1 m/s)	Divine Iheme; Great Britain	10.29 CR, =EU18L, =PB	Francisco de Las Heras; Spain	10.36 NU18B	Marco Glinz; Austria	10.45 NU18B
200 metres Wind: (+0.7 m/s)	Bronson Hearn-Smith; Great Britain	20.70 CR, PB	Bartosz Pytlik; Poland	21.01	Iker Piñeira; Spain	21.08 NU18B
400 metres	Sebastian Karp; Slovakia	46.53 EU18L, NU18B	Jakub Marek; Czech Republic	46.59 PB	Lukáš Bednarík; Czech Republic	47.03 PB
800 metres	Axel Mougel-Depoutot; France	1:49.76	Sergio Redondo; Spain	1:49.93	Magnus Riddell; Great Britain	1:50.12
1500 metres	Freddie Rowe; Great Britain	3:55.33	Alistair Street; Great Britain	3:56.80	Alex Sangil; Spain	3:57.70
3000 metres	Joseph Scanes; Great Britain	8:09.19 PB	Maximilian Rath; Germany	8:09.40 PB	Jonathan Albustin; Germany	8:10.01 PB
110 metres hurdles Wind: (+0.5 m/s)	Yunus Emre Civelek; Turkey	13.08 NU18B	Eljahro Philipsen; Netherlands	13.09	Nicolás Ceballos; Spain	13.35 NU18B
400 metres hurdles	Mauro Seguín; Spain	50.62	Tristan Luño; Spain	50.65 PB	Zsombor Klucsik; Austria	51.27 NU18B
2000 metres steeplechase	Pablo Vázquez; Spain	5:49.03	Jonas Beutler; Switzerland	5:49.51	Abdulsamet Duman; Turkey	5:50.07 PB
5000 m walk	Gabriel González; Spain	20:33.76	Davide Sorressa; Italy	20:40.16 PB	Patrik Pivarski; Croatia	20:40.66
High jump	Samuel James; Great Britain	2.25 m CR, WU18L, PB	Dawid Barański; Poland	2.12 m	Jan Ungeheuer; Germany	2.09 m PB
Pole vault	Jonathan Hummel; Germany	5.15 m EU18L, PB	Axel Faye; France	5.10 m PB	Lukáš Kratochvíl; Czech Republic	5.00 m
Long jump	Pyry Heiskanen; Finland	7.79 m EU18L, NU18B	Maïdis Gorrillot; France	7.71 m	Otakar Vich; Czech Republic	7.64 m PB
Triple jump	Tito Odunaike; Great Britain	16.12 m CR, =WU18L, =PB	Mátyás Bella; Hungary	15.49 m PB	Dimitrios Moumouris; Greece	15.49 m
Shot put	Clésio de Carvalho; Germany	20.15 m	Antony del Pioluogo; Italy	19.81 m	Adrian Dral; Poland	19.75 m
Discus throw	Moyo Stumpenhusen; Great Britain	64.92 m CR, NU18B	Jan Valenta; Czech Republic	62.82 m NU18B	John-Christian Schochardt; Germany	62.56 m PB
Hammer throw	Josef Pazdera; Czech Republic	79.07 m WU18L, NU18B	Petros Kassavitas; Greece	75.24 m PB	Janne Verho; Finland	74.37 m
Javelin throw	Jere Murto; Finland	80.41 m WU18L, PB	Edward Scott; Great Britain	70.02 m	Jevin Rasanayagam; Switzerland	69.06 m PB
Decathlon	Sebastián Andrejev; Czech Republic	7523 pts WU18L, PB	Aleksander Metsmaker; Estonia	7507 pts PB	Oliver Downs; Great Britain	7341 pts NU18B
Medley relay	Czech Republic; Jan Tuhácek; Štepán Vardžák; Lukáš Bednarík; Jakub Marek	1:51.44 CR, WL, NU18B	Spain; Francisco de Las Heras; Iker Piñeira; Alex Sola; Tristan Luño	1:51.81 NU18B	France; Pierre Ivanes; Maïdis Gorrillot; Antoine Marx; Dylan Telo	1:52.85 SB

* Indicates that the athlete participated only in the preliminary heats and also received a medal as part of the relay.

=== Women ===
Event	Gold		Silver		Bronze	
100 metres Wind: (+0.6 m/s)	Kelly Doualla; Italy	11.14 CR, EU18B, WU18L	Apostolia Antonatou; Greece	11.46 NU18B	Celine Obinna-Alo; Great Britain	11.50
200 metres Wind: (+0.3 m/s)	Mariona Armero; Spain	23.57 NU18B	Carolina-Andreea Pungă; Romania	23.58 PB	Aneta Onderková; Czech Republic	23.87
400 metres	Eleni Iakovaki; Greece	52.38 EU18L, NU18B	Sophie Akuchi Emmanuel; Hungary	52.80 NU18B	Zofia Pasierbek; Poland	53.08 PB
800 metres	Živa Remic; Slovenia	2:03.77 CR	Magda Karall; Austria	2:05.88 NU18B	Isabelle Gaffney; Ireland	2:06.10 =PB
1500 metres	Alice Penciu-Jurin; France	4:22.77	Emma Hickey; Ireland	4:24.90	Mila Klein; Germany	4:26.49
3000 metres	Aimie Decrausaz; Switzerland	9:06.60 CR, EU18L, NU18B	Natasza Dudek; Poland	9:21.02 NU18B	Pauline Daumas; France	9:22.33
100 metres hurdles Wind: (+0.9 m/s)	Delisha Domingos; Germany	13.00 NU18B	Alessia Succo; Italy	13.14	Anna Peeters; France	13.21
400 metres hurdles	Linda Botková; Czech Republic	55.19 CR, EU20R, WU18L	Mina Hirsbrunner; Switzerland	57.83 NU18B	Lucia Bertacchini; Great Britain	58.13
2000 metres steeplechase	Franziska Gräter; Germany	6:36.03 PB	Lucie Cawley; Ireland	6:36.22 NU18B	Lucie Jílková; Czech Republic	6:37.60 PB
5000 m walk	Rebecca D'Alessandro; Italy	22:58.95	Paula Elvira; Spain	23:18.98	Caterina Carissimi; Italy	23:21.37
High jump	Karina Niżyńska; Poland	1.84 m	Alessandra Bighi; Italy	1.82 m PB	Lea Völcker; Germany	1.80 m
Pole vault	Julie Bourgis; France	4.40 m CR, PB	Isild Drouet; France	4.35 m	Alba Benito; Spain	4.15 m NU18B
Long jump	Kristýna Záhorová; Czech Republic	6.47 m CR, EU18L, NU18B	Emīlija Brauna; Latvia	6.24 m PB	Gift Okunrobo; Spain	6.21 m SB
Triple jump	Viktoria Angelova; Bulgaria	13.98 m CR, WU18L, PB	Eylül Dönmez; Turkey	13.45 m NU18B	Gift Okunrobo; Spain	13.23 m SB
Shot put	Emma le Blansch; Netherlands	17.76 m PB	Kinga Jackowska; Poland	17.50 m	Zsófi Marton; Hungary	17.35 m NU18B
Discus throw	Marina Hadjicosta; Cyprus	56.17 m	Emma le Blansch; Netherlands	53.54 m PB	Sarah Berkani; Sweden	50.91 m PB
Hammer throw	Milaniia Kokhan; Ukraine	70.19 m EU18L, PB	Loan Rodride; France	68.91 m PB	Oriana Lovrec; Slovenia	67.02 m PB
Javelin throw	Lucy Bull; Great Britain	56.60 PB	Ema Trogrlić; Croatia	56.40 PB	Simanur Bilgili; Turkey	55.72
Heptathlon	Alisa Launonen; Finland	6154 pts WU18L, NU18B	Svea Funck; Germany	6065 pts NU18B	Fleur Favre; Netherlands	5822 pts NU18B
Medley relay	Czech Republic; Klára Kaderová; Aneta Onderková; Linda Botková; Anna Cerovská	2:05.65 WL, NU18B	Poland |Iga Niezgoda; Maja Gondek; Zofia Pasierbek; Martyna Machała	2:06.99 SB	Italy; Giorgia Castiglione; Kelly Doualla; Elisa Calzolari; Micol Candidi	2:07.43 SB

* Indicates that the athlete participated only in the preliminary heats and also received a medal as part of the relay.

== Medal table ==
* Host nation (Italy)

Rank	Nation	Gold	Silver	Bronze	Total
1	Great Britain (GBR)	8	2	4	14
2	Czech Republic (CZE)	6	2	5	13
3	Spain (ESP)	4	5	6	15
4	Germany (GER)	4	2	5	11
5	France (FRA)	3	4	3	10
6	Finland (FIN)	3	0	1	4
7	Italy (ITA)*	2	4	2	8
8	Poland (POL)	1	5	2	8
9	Greece (GRE)	1	2	1	4
9	Netherlands (NED)	1	2	1	4
9	Switzerland (SUI)	1	2	1	4
12	Turkey (TUR)	1	1	2	4
13	Slovenia (SLO)	1	0	1	2
14	Bulgaria (BUL)	1	0	0	1
14	Cyprus (CYP)	1	0	0	1
14	Slovakia (SVK)	1	0	0	1
14	Ukraine (UKR)	1	0	0	1
18	Hungary (HUN)	0	2	1	3
18	Ireland (IRL)	0	2	1	3
20	Austria (AUT)	0	1	2	3
21	Croatia (CRO)	0	1	1	2
22	Estonia (EST)	0	1	0	1
22	Latvia (LAT)	0	1	0	1
22	Romania (ROU)	0	1	0	1
25	Sweden (SWE)	0	0	1	1
Totals (25 entries)		40	40	40	120

== Participating nations ==
1104 competitors (551 boys and 553 girls) from 48 countries will compete.

- Albania (1)
- Andorra (1)
- Armenia (3)
- Austria (18)
- Azerbaijan (1)
- Belgium (6)
- Bosnia and Herzegovina (3)
- Bulgaria (22)
- Croatia (19)
- Cyprus (11)
- Czech Republic (51)
- Denmark (11)
- Estonia (15)
- Finland (51)
- France (50)
- Georgia (2)
- Germany (89)
- Great Britain (49)
- Greece (44)
- Hungary (51)
- Iceland (6)
- Ireland (26)
- Israel (12)
- Italy (75) (host)
- Kosovo (4)
- Latvia (24)
- Liechtenstein (1)
- Lithuania (11)
- Luxembourg (2)
- Malta (3)
- Moldova (1)
- Monaco (1)
- Montenegro (2)
- Netherlands (16)
- North Macedonia (2)
- Norway (16)
- Poland (59)
- Portugal (33)
- Romania (20)
- San Marino (2)
- Serbia (15)
- Slovakia (21)
- Slovenia (29)
- Spain (67)
- Sweden (26)
- Switzerland (47)
- Turkey (51)
- Ukraine (34)
