= Linda Botková =

Czech hurdler (born 2010)

Personal information
- Born: 6 February 2010 (age 16)

Sport
- Sport: Athletics
- Event: Hurdles

Achievements and titles
- Personal bests: 400mH: 55.19 (Rieti, 2026) EU20R
Medal record
Women's athletics
Representing Czech Republic
World U20 Championships
| Silver medal – second place | 2026 Eugene | 4x400 m mixed |
European U18 Championships
| Gold medal – first place | 2026 Rieti | 400m Hurdles |
| Gold medal – first place | 2026 Rieti | Medley relay |

Linda Botková (born 6 February 2010) is a Czech hurdler. In 2026, she set a European U18 best in the 300 metres hurdles and 400 metres hurdles, and won the gold medal in the 400m hurdles at the 2026 European Athletics U18 Championships.

== Biography ==
Botková trains in the Olymp Prague club in Prague with coaches Michal Krčmář and Petr Habásek. She set multiple Czech age-group records in a number of disciplines including 60 metres hurdles and 100 metres hurdles and heptathlon.

In 2026, Botková set a European U18 best in the 300m hurdles with a time of 39.35 seconds. She also went into the 2026 European Athletics U18 Championships as the European under-18 leader for the 400 metres hurdles with a time of 57.03 seconds. She ran 56.79 for the 400 metres hurdles in the opening round of the European U18 Championships to set a new Czech U18 record and championship record on 17 July, taking 1.21 seconds from the previous record set by compatriot Nina Radová in 2024. In the semi-final the following day, she again eased before the line but broke the championship record for the second time in as many days with a new best of 56.78 seconds. In the final, her winning time of 55.19 seconds moved to second on the world U18 all-time list behind only Sydney McLaughlin, and broke the four-decade old European U18 record held by Bulgaria's Radostina Shtereva since 1983, as well as the European U20 record held by Ionela Tirlea since 1995. Later at the championship she was part of the Czech 1000 metres medley relay with Klára Kaderová, Aneta Onderková, and Anna Cerovská, as they won the gold medal in a championship record and Czech U18 record time of 2:05.65.

On 5 August, she ran the anchor leg as Czechia won the silver medal in the mixed 4 x 400 metres at the 2026 World Athletics U20 Championships, moving the team from sixth place to second on her leg. At the championships, her coach decided she should only run the 100 meters hurdles rather than the usual 400 metres hurdles so as to not risk over-training. She was nominated for European Athletics Women’s Rising Star for 2026 and was named Breakthrough of the Year by Czech Athletics.
