= Givat Ram Stadium =

Athletics stadium in Jerusalem

Hebrew University Stadium
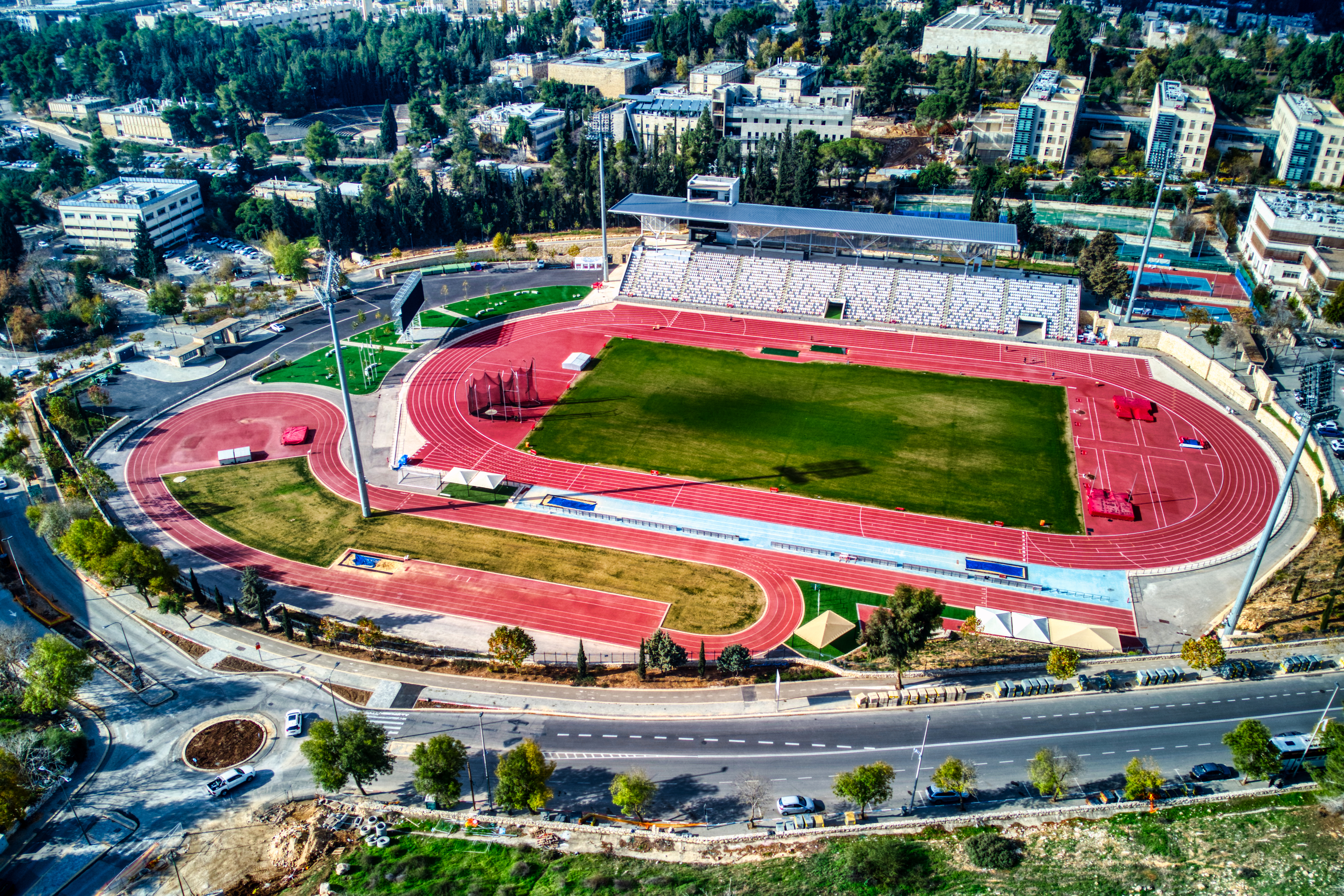
- Interactive map of Hebrew University Stadium
- Full name: Hebrew University Stadium
- Location: Jerusalem
- Coordinates: 31°46′33″N 35°12′0″E
- Owner: HUJI
- Operator: HUJI
- Capacity: 4,000
- Surface: Grass

Construction
- Groundbreaking: 1958
- Opened: 1958
- Renovated: 1997

Tenants
- Hebrew University of Jerusalem; Hapoel Katamon Jerusalem (2007, 2009–2011); Agudat Sport Nordia Jerusalem (2014–present); 1964 AFC Asian Cup

Hebrew University Stadium (also National and University Stadium) is a multi-use national stadium on the Givat Ram campus of the Hebrew University of Jerusalem in Jerusalem.

== History ==
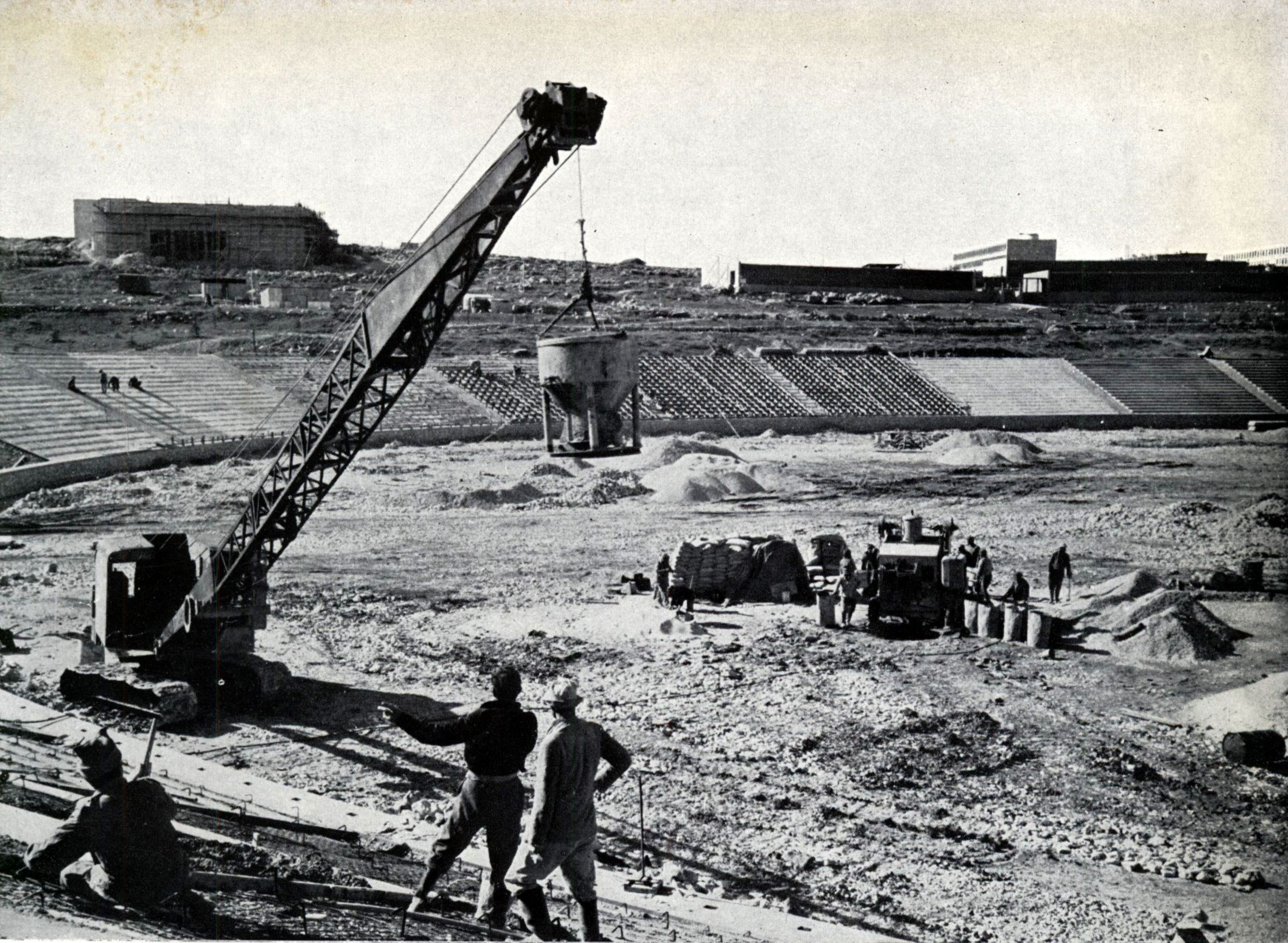
Stadium under construction, 1957

The National and University Stadium was inaugurated in 1958 in honor of the 10th anniversary of the founding of the State of Israel. The stadium holds 4,000 spectators. It hosted some of the 1964 AFC Asian Cup matches, as well as the opening ceremonies of the 1968 Summer Paralympics. In 1997 the stadium was renovated and used for athletic contests and football games of Agudat Sport Nordia Jerusalem.

The European Athletics U18 Championships took place at the stadium in July 2022. The following year, the European Athletics U20 Championships took place as well at the stadium.
