= European Athletics U20 Championships =

Under-20 athletics competition

- Status: active
- Genre: sports event
- Date: midyear
- Frequency: biennial
- Inaugurated: 1970
- Organiser: European Athletic Association
- Website: www.european-athletics.com/competitions/european-athletics-u20-championships/overview
- 2025

The European Athletics U20 Championships (formerly named the European Athletics Junior Championships up to 2015) are the European championships for athletes who are under-20 athletes, which is the age range recognised by World Athletics as junior athletes. The event is currently organized by the European Athletic Association.

== History ==
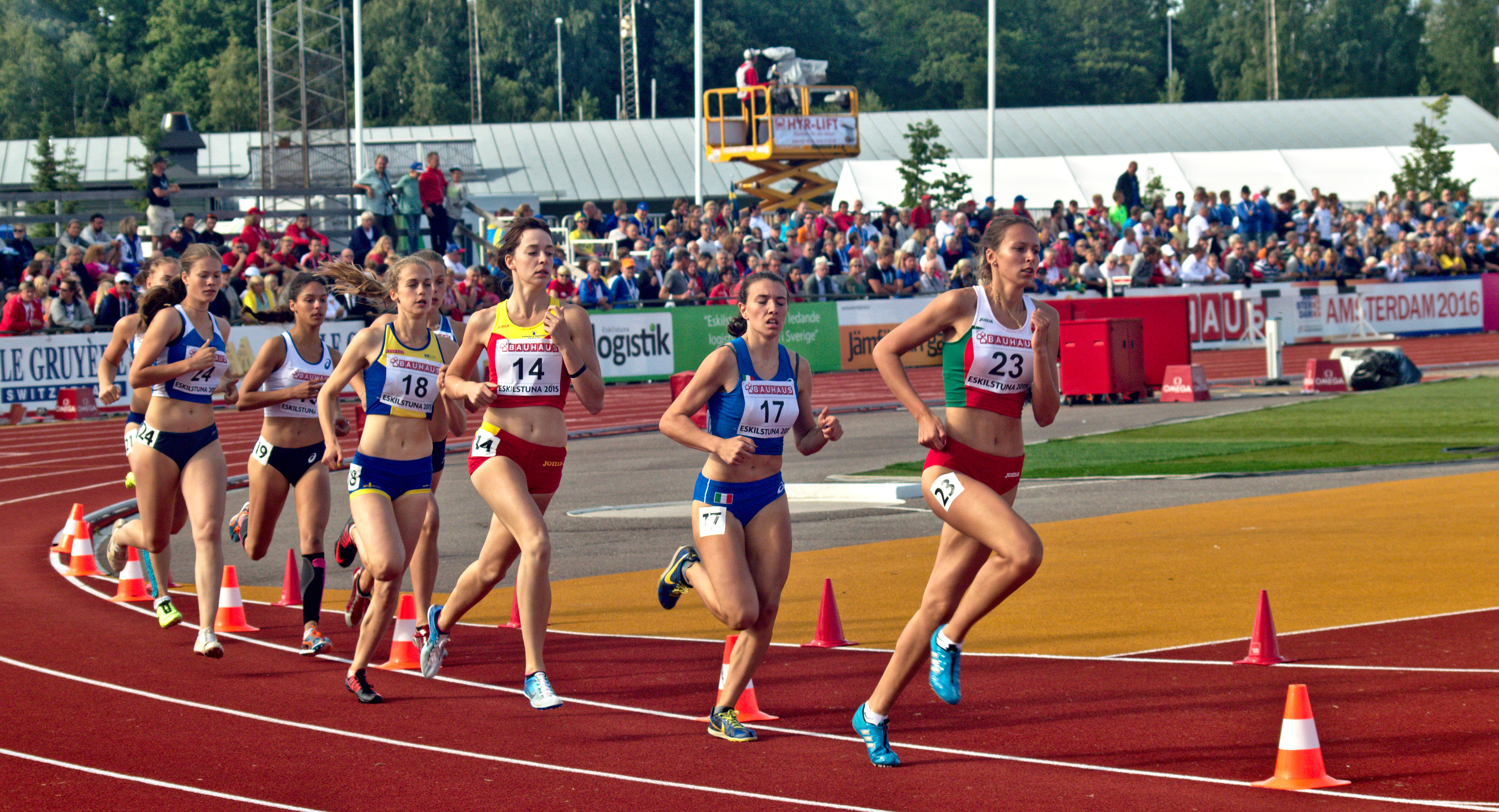
Women's 800 meter in heptathlon at the 2015 Championships

The history of the biennial athletics competition stems from the European Junior Games, which was first held in 1964, 1970 to 2015 European Junior Championships and since 2017 European U20 Championships. The event was first sanctioned by the continental governing body, the European Athletic Association at the following edition in 1966 and after a third edition under the games moniker it was renamed to its current title.

== Editions ==
Ed.	Year	City	Country	Date	Venue	Events	Top of the medal table
European Junior Games
—	1964	Warsaw	Poland	18–20 September	10th-Anniversary Stadium	29	Poland
—	1966	Odesa	Soviet Union	24–25 September	Central Stadium Chornomorets	33	Soviet Union
—	1968	Leipzig	East Germany	23–25 August	Zentralstadion	33	Soviet Union
European Junior Championships
1	1970	Paris	France	11–13 September	Stade Olympique de Colombes	35	East Germany
2	1973	Duisburg	Germany	24–26 August	Wedaustadion	36	East Germany
3	1975	Athens	Greece	22–24 August	Karaiskakis Stadium	36	East Germany
4	1977	Donetsk	Soviet Union	19–21 August	RSC Olimpiyskiy	36	East Germany
5	1979	Bydgoszcz	Poland	16–19 August	Zdzisław Krzyszkowiak Stadium	36	East Germany
6	1981	Utrecht	Netherlands	20–23 August	Atletiekbaan Overvecht	38	East Germany
7	1983	Schwechat	Austria	25–28 August	Rudolf-Tonn-Stadion	38	East Germany
8	1985	Cottbus	East Germany	22–25 August	Max-Reimann-Stadion	39	East Germany
9	1987	Birmingham	United Kingdom	6–9 August	Alexander Stadium	41	East Germany
10	1989	Varaždin	Yugoslavia	24–27 August	Stadion ŠC Sloboda	41	East Germany
11	1991	Thessaloniki	Greece	8–11 August	Kaftanzoglio Stadium	42	Soviet Union
12	1993	San Sebastián	Spain	29 July – 1 August	Anoeta Stadium	41	Great Britain
13	1995	Nyíregyháza	Hungary	27–30 July	Városi Stadion	41	France
14	1997	Ljubljana	Slovenia	24–27 July	Bežigrad Stadium	43	Germany
15	1999	Riga	Latvia	5–8 August	Daugava Stadium	43	Germany
16	2001	Grosseto	Italy	19–22 July	Stadio Olimpico Carlo Zecchini	44	Russia
17	2003	Tampere	Finland	23–27 July	Tampere Stadium	44	Germany
18	2005	Kaunas	Lithuania	21–24 July	S. Darius and S. Girėnas Stadium	44	Germany
19	2007	Hengelo	Netherlands	19–22 July	Fanny Blankers-Koen Stadion	44	Russia
20	2009	Novi Sad	Serbia	23–26 July	Karađorđe Stadium	44	Germany
21	2011	Tallinn	Estonia	21–24 July	Kadriorg Stadium	44	Russia
22	2013	Rieti	Italy	18–21 July	Stadio Raul Guidobaldi	44	Great Britain
23	2015	Eskilstuna	Sweden	16–19 July	Ekängens Friidrottsarena	44	Great Britain
European U20 Championships
24	2017	Grosseto	Italy	20–23 July	Stadio Olimpico Carlo Zecchini	44	Germany
25	2019	Borås	Sweden	18–21 July	Ryavallen	44	Great Britain
26	2021	Tallinn	Estonia	15–18 July	Kadriorg Stadium	44	Great Britain
27	2023	Jerusalem	Israel	7–10 August	Givat Ram Stadium	44	Germany
28	2025	Tampere	Finland	7–10 August	Tampere Stadium	44	Italy
29	2027	Bydgoszcz	Poland	15–18 July	Zdzisław Krzyszkowiak Stadium	44	

== Championship records ==
=== Men ===
Event	Record	Athlete	Nationality	Date	Meet	Place	Ref.
100 m	10.04 (+0.2 m/s)	Christophe Lemaitre	France	24 July 2009	2009	Novi Sad, Serbia	
200 m	20.33 (−0.1 m/s)	Ramil Guliyev	Azerbaijan	25 July 2009	2009	Novi Sad, Serbia	
400 m	45.36	Roger Black	Great Britain	24 August 1985	1985	Cottbus, East Germany	
800 m	1:45.90	Roberto Parra	Spain	29 July 1995	1995	Nyíregyháza, Hungary	
1500 m	3:38.96	Graham Williamson	Great Britain	16 August 1979	1979	Bydgoszcz, Poland	
3000 m	7:57.18	Rainer Wachenbrunner	East Germany	23 August 1981	1981	Utrecht, Netherlands	
5000 m	13:44.37	Steve Binns	Great Britain	18 August 1979	1979	Bydgoszcz, Poland	
10,000 m	28:31.16	Ali Kaya	Turkey	18 July 2013	2013	Rieti, Italy	
110 m hurdles (99.0 cm)	13.05 (+0.2 m/s)	Sasha Zhoya	France	17 July 2021	2021	Tallinn, Estonia	
400 m hurdles	48.78	Michal Rada	Czech Republic	9 August 2025	2025	Tampere, Finland	
3000 m steeplechase	8:37.94	Ilgizar Safiullin	Russia	24 July 2011	2011	Tallinn, Estonia	
High jump	2.33 m	Maksim Nedasekau	Belarus	22 July 2017	2017	Grosseto, Italy	
Pole vault	5.65 m	Armand Duplantis	Sweden	23 July 2017	2017	Grosseto, Italy	
Long jump	8.23 m (−0.2 m/s)	Mattia Furlani	Italy	8 August 2023	2023	Jerusalem, Israel	
Triple jump	17.04 m (+1.5 m/s)	Nazim Babayev	Azerbaijan	19 July 2015	2015	Eskilstuna, Sweden	
Shot put (6 kg)	22.62 m	Konrad Bukowiecki	Poland	16 July 2015	2015	Eskilstuna, Sweden	
Discus throw (1.75 kg)	68.02 m	Bartłomiej Stój	Poland	19 July 2015	2015	Eskilstuna, Sweden	
Hammer throw (6 kg)	84.73 m	Mykhaylo Kokhan	Ukraine	19 July 2019	2019	Borås, Sweden	
Javelin throw	81.53 m	Zigismunds Sirmais	Latvia	23 July 2011	2011	Tallinn, Estonia	
Decathlon	8514 pts WU20R	Hubert Troscianka	Poland	7–8 August 2025	2025	Tampere, Finland	
Decathlon	100m (wind) / Long jump (wind) / Shot put / High jump / 400m / 110m H (wind) / Discus / Pole vault / Javelin / 1500m; 10.74 (−0.7 m/s) / 7.26 m (+0.3 m/s) / 15.48 m / 1.94 m / 46.21 / 14.23 (−2.0 m/s) / 43.36 m / 4.80 m / 68.87 m / 4:28.59						
10,000 m walk (track)	39:10.04	Joan Querol Serrano	Spain	10 August 2025	2025	Tampere, Finland	
4 × 100 m relay	39.24	Tyrone Edgar; Dwayne Grant; Tim Benjamin; Mark Lewis-Francis	Great Britain	22 July 2001	2001	Grosseto, Italy	
4 × 400 m relay	3:04.58	Uwe Preusche; Frank Löper; Eckard Trylus; Jens Carlowitz	East Germany	23 August 1981	1981	Utrecht, Netherlands	

=== Decathlon disciplines best ===
Event	Record	Athlete	Nation	Date	Championships	Place	Ref.
100 m	10.31 (+3.5 m/s)	Roko Farkaš	Croatia	9 August 2023	2023	Jerusalem, Israel	
Long jump	7.73 m (+1.8 m/s)	Ladji Doucouré	France	19 July 2001	2001	Grosseto, Italy	
Shot put	16.68 m	Ludovic Besson	France	22 July 2017	2017	Grosseto, Italy	
High jump	2.17 m	Mauri Kaattari	Finland	21 July 2005	2005	Kaunas, Lithuania	
400 m	46.21	Hubert Troscianka	Poland	7 August 2025	2025	Tampere, Finland	
110 m hurdles	13.57 (−0.1 m/s)	Simon Ehammer	Switzerland	20 July 2019	2019	Borås, Sweden	
Discus throw	54.75 m	Jan Doležal	Czech Republic	19 July 2015	2015	Eskilstuna, Sweden	
Pole vault	5.10 m	Amadeus Gräber	Germany	10 August 2023	2023	Jerusalem, Israel	
Javelin throw	68.87 m	Hubert Troscianka	Poland	8 August 2025	2025	Tampere, Finland	
1500 m	4:09.09	Benjamin Fenrich	France	24 July 2009	2009	Novi Sad, Serbia	

=== Women ===
Event	Record	Athlete	Nationality	Date	Meet	Place	Ref.
100 m	11.18 (+0.5 m/s)	Jodie Williams	Great Britain	22 July 2011	2011	Tallinn, Estonia	
200 m	22.85	Bärbel Eckert	East Germany	26 August 1973	1973	Duisburg, West Germany	
400 m	51.27	Christina Brehmer	East Germany	23 August 1975	1975	Athens, Greece	
800 m	2:00.25	Katrin Wühn	East Germany	27 August 1983	1983	Schwechat, Austria	
1500 m	4:07.47	Inger Knutsson	Sweden	26 August 1973	1973	Duisburg, West Germany	
3000 m	8:46.39	Innes FitzGerald	Great Britain	10 August 2025	2025	Tampere, Finland	
5000 m	15:03.85	Agate Caune	Latvia	10 August 2023	2023	Jerusalem, Israel	
100 m hurdles	13.09	Olena Ovcharova	Ukraine	28 July 1995	1995	Nyíregyháza, Hungary	
400 m hurdles	55.55	Alexandra Stefania Uta	Romania	9 August 2025	2025	Tampere, Finland	
3000 m steeplechase	9:43.69	Karoline Bjerkeli Grøvdal	Norway	26 July 2009	2009	Novi Sad, Serbia	
High jump	1.95 m	Yelena Yelesina	Soviet Union	27 August 1989	1989	Varaždin, Yugoslavia	
High jump	1.95 m	Maria Kuchina	Russia	24 July 2011	2011	Tallinn, Estonia	
Pole vault	4.57 m	Angelica Bengtsson	Sweden	23 July 2011	2011	Tallinn, Estonia	
Long jump	6.80 m (+0.3 m/s)	Darya Klishina	Russia	24 July 2009	2009	Novi Sad, Serbia	
Triple jump	14.24 m (±0.0 m/s)	Erika Saraceni	Italy	8 August 2025	2025	Tampere, Finland	
Shot put	19.53 m	Astrid Kumbernuss	East Germany	25 August 1989	1989	Varaždin, Yugoslavia	
Discus throw	70.58 m	Ilke Wyludda	East Germany	8 August 1987	1987	Birmingham, United Kingdom	
Hammer throw	71.06 m	Silja Kosonen	Finland	17 July 2021	2021	Tallinn, Estonia	
Javelin throw	61.52	Nikolett Szabo	Hungary	8 August 1999	1999	Riga, Latvia	
Heptathlon	6465 pts	Sybille Thiele	East Germany	28 August 1983	1983	Schwechat, Austria	
Heptathlon	100m H (wind) / High jump / Shot put / 200m (wind) / Long jump (wind) / Javelin / 800m; 13.49 / 1.90 m / 14.63 m / 24.07 / 6.65 m / 36.22 m / 2:18.36						
10,000 m walk (track)	42:59.48	Elena Lashmanova	Russia	21 July 2011	2011	Tallinn, Estonia	
4 × 100 m relay	43.27 WJR	Katrin Fehm; Keshia Kwadwo; Sophia Junk; Jennifer Montag	Germany	23 July 2017	2017	Grosseto, Italy	
4 × 400 m relay	3:30.39	Cornelia Feuerbach; Carola Witzel; Ines Vogelgesang; Heike Böhme	East Germany	23 August 1981	1981	Utrecht, Netherlands	

=== Heptathlon disciplines best ===
Event	Record	Athlete	Nation	Date	Championships	Place	Ref.
100m hurdles							
High jump	1.92	Jana Koscak	Croatia	9 August 2025	2025	Tampere, Finland	
Shot put							
200m							
Long jump							
Javelin							
800m	2:09.80						

== All-time medal table ==
=== European U20/Junior Championships ===
Medal table includes 1970–2025 Championships.

Rank	Nation	Gold	Silver	Bronze	Total
1	East Germany (GDR)	146	90	60	296
2	Great Britain (GBR)	140	107	122	369
3	Germany (GER)	106	105	100	311
4	Soviet Union (URS)	83	102	88	273
5	Russia (RUS)	80	77	61	218
6	France (FRA)	58	74	82	214
7	Poland (POL)	54	61	69	184
8	Italy (ITA)	41	45	68	154
9	Romania (ROU)	38	42	31	111
10	Spain (ESP)	37	29	54	120
11	West Germany (FRG)	31	47	42	120
12	Sweden (SWE)	30	25	25	80
13	Ukraine (UKR)	29	22	26	77
14	Finland (FIN)	28	36	35	99
15	Netherlands (NED)	25	31	24	80
16	Hungary (HUN)	19	24	23	66
17	Turkey (TUR)	18	20	15	53
18	Czech Republic (CZE)	17	14	22	53
19	Belarus (BLR)	16	25	21	62
20	Belgium (BEL)	16	15	19	50
21	Bulgaria (BUL)	15	27	26	68
22	Norway (NOR)	14	19	12	45
23	Switzerland (SUI)	14	14	13	41
24	Croatia (CRO)	11	7	8	26
25	Ireland (IRL)	10	8	7	25
26	Czechoslovakia (TCH)	10	5	11	26
27	Greece (GRE)	9	11	12	32
28	Latvia (LAT)	8	9	9	26
29	Portugal (POR)	7	9	7	23
30	Serbia (SRB)	6	6	3	15
–	Authorised Neutral Athletes (ANA)	6	3	3	12
31	Denmark (DEN)	5	6	10	21
32	Estonia (EST)	5	2	8	15
33	Austria (AUT)	4	5	10	19
34	Azerbaijan (AZE)	4	4	1	9
35	Slovenia (SLO)	3	7	2	12
36	Yugoslavia (YUG)	2	8	7	17
37	Lithuania (LTU)	2	4	2	8
38	Cyprus (CYP)	2	2	1	5
39	Slovakia (SVK)	1	3	6	10
40	Iceland (ISL)	1	1	2	4
41	Moldova (MDA)	1	1	1	3
42	Israel (ISR)	1	0	1	2
43	Armenia (ARM)	1	0	0	1
43	Bosnia and Herzegovina (BIH)	1	0	0	1
43	Kosovo (KOS)	1	0	0	1
46	Montenegro (MNE)	0	2	1	3
47	Albania (ALB)	0	2	0	2
48	Serbia and Montenegro (SCG)	0	1	1	2
49	Luxembourg (LUX)	0	1	0	1
Totals (49 entries)		1,156	1,158	1,151	3,465

=== European Junior Games ===
Medal table includes 1964–1968 Championships.

Rank	Nation	Gold	Silver	Bronze	Total
1	Soviet Union (URS)	35	31	19	85
2	East Germany (GDR)	20	21	19	60
3	Poland (POL)	10	11	16	37
4	West Germany (FRG)	5	9	0	14
5	Romania (ROU)	4	5	9	18
6	Sweden (SWE)	4	2	3	9
7	France (FRA)	3	3	4	10
8	Hungary (HUN)	3	1	5	9
9	Yugoslavia (YUG)	2	2	4	8
10	Finland (FIN)	2	1	1	4
10	Italy (ITA)	2	1	1	4
12	Switzerland (SUI)	2	0	0	2
13	Bulgaria (BUL)	1	3	5	9
13	Czechoslovakia (TCH)	1	3	5	9
15	Belgium (BEL)	1	0	1	2
16	Greece (GRE)	0	1	1	2
16	Netherlands (NED)	0	1	1	2
18	Denmark (DEN)	0	0	1	1
Totals (18 entries)		95	95	95	285

== See also ==
- IAAF World U20 Championships
