= European Athletics U18 Championships =

Biennial athletics competition

- Status: active
- Genre: sports event
- Date: midyear
- Frequency: biennial
- Inaugurated: 2016
- Organiser: European Athletic Association
- Website: Official website
- 2026

The European Athletics U18 Championships (named as European Athletics Youth Championships in 2016) are a biennial athletics competition for European athletes under the age of eighteen (youth category).

The creation of the competition stemmed from the 2013 European Athletics Congress. The event was created to promote the sport among young people in Europe. Each country may send a maximum of two athletes per event. The European U18 Championships will be the third age category championships organised by the European Athletic Association, following on from the long-running European Athletics U20 Championships (first held in 1970) and the European Athletics U23 Championships (first held in 1997).

The first iteration of the championships took place in 2016. This means that the event serves in the alternate years between the European Youth Olympic Festival, another biennial under-18s event hosted by the European Olympic Committees.

== Editions ==
Ed.	Year	Host city	Host country	Date	Venue	Events	Top of the medal table
1	2016	Tbilisi	Georgia	14–17 July	Athletics Stadium of Tbilisi	40	Great Britain
2	2018	Győr	Hungary	5–8 July	Olympic Sport Park	40	Great Britain
–	~~2020~~; ~~2021~~	Rieti	Italy	~~26–29 August~~ cancelled	Stadio Raul Guidobaldi	–	—
3	2022	Jerusalem	Israel	4–7 July	Givat Ram Stadium	40	Great Britain
4	2024	Banská Bystrica	Slovakia	18–21 July	Národný Atletický Štadión	40	Italy
5	2026	Rieti	Italy	16–19 July	Stadio Raul Guidobaldi	40	Great Britain
6	2028	Tallinn	Estonia	3–6 August	Kadriorg Stadium		
7	2030	Karlstad	Sweden	TBA	Tingvalla IP		

== Championships records ==
=== Boys ===
Event	Record	Athlete	Nationality	Date	Meet	Place	Ref.
100 m	10.29 (+0.1 m/s)	Divine Iheme	Great Britain	17 July 2026	2026 Championships	Rieti, Italy	
200 m	20.70 (+0.7 m/s)	Bronson Hearn-Smith	Great Britain	18 July 2026	2026 Championships	Rieti, Italy	
400 m	46.50	Stanisław Strzelecki	Poland	20 July 2024	2024 Championships	Banská Bystrica, Slovakia	
800 m	1:47.36	Max Burgin	Great Britain	8 July 2018	2018 Championships	Győr, Hungary	
1500 m	3:49.99	Niels Laros	Netherlands	6 July 2022	2022 Championships	Jerusalem, Israel	
3000 m	8:07.03	Aldin Ćatović	Serbia	21 July 2024	2024 Championships	Banská Bystrica, Slovakia	
110 m hurdles (91.4 cm)	12.96 (+1.3 m/s) EU18B	Eljahro Philipsen	Netherlands	18 July 2026	2026 Championships	Rieti, Italy	
400 m hurdles (84.0 cm)	49.42 EU18B	Michal Rada	Czech Republic	21 July 2024	2024 Championships	Banská Bystrica, Slovakia	
2000 m steeplechase (84.0 cm)	5:38.55	Sergio del Barrio	Spain	7 July 2022	2022 Championships	Jerusalem, Israel	
High jump	2.25 m	Samuel James	Great Britain	19 July 2026	2026 Championships	Rieti, Italy	
Pole vault	5.46 m	Pål Haugen Lillefosse	Norway	8 July 2018	2018 Championships	Győr, Hungary	
Long jump	8.04 m (+1.8 m/s)	Mattia Furlani	Italy	5 July 2022	2022 Championships	Jerusalem, Israel	
Triple jump	16.12 m (−0.9 m/s)	Tito Odunaike	Great Britain	18 July 2026	2026 Championships	Rieti, Italy	
Shot put (5 kg)	21.51 m	Odisseas Mouzenidis	Greece	15 July 2016	2016 Championships	Tbilisi, Georgia	
Discus throw (1.5 kg)	64.92 m	Moyo Stumpenhusen	Great Britain	18 July 2026	2026 Championships	Rieti, Italy	
Hammer throw (5 kg)	87.82 m WYB	Mykhaylo Kokhan	Ukraine	7 July 2018	2018 Championships	Győr, Hungary	
Javelin throw (700 g)	84.52 m EU18B	Topi Parviainen	Finland	6 July 2022	2022 Championships	Jerusalem, Israel	
Decathlon	7626 pts	Amadeus Gräber	Germany	6–7 July 2022	2022 Championships	Jerusalem, Israel	
Decathlon	100m (wind) / Long jump (wind) / Shot put / High jump / 400m / 110m H (wind) / Discus / Pole vault / Javelin / 1500m; 11.05 (+1.2 m/s) / 6.88 m (+0.9 m/s) / 14.33 m / 1.96 m / 50.27 / 14.45 (−1.3 m/s) / 37.98 m / 4.40 m / 55.57 m / 4:32.21						
10,000 m walk (track)	44:01.60	Frederick Weigel	Germany	7 July 2022	2022 Championships	Jerusalem, Israel	
Swedish medley relay	1:51.44	Jan Tuhácek; Štepán Vardžák; Lukáš Bednarík; Jakub Marek	Czech Republic	19 July 2026	2026 Championships	Rieti, Italy	

==== Decathlon disciplines ====
Event	Record	Score	Athlete	Nation	Date	Meet	Place	Age	Ref.
100 m	10.57		Roko Farkaš	Croatia	6 July 2022	2022 Championships	Jerusalem, Israel		
Long jump	7.44 m		Alexandre Montagne	France	6 July 2022	2022 Championships	Jerusalem, Israel		
Shot put (5 kg)	17.17 m		Oļegs Kozjakovs	Latvia	7 July 2018	2018 Championships	Győr, Hungary		
High jump	2.08 m		Harry Richard Jääger	Estonia	6 July 2022	2022 Championships	Jerusalem, Israel		
400 m	48.60	880 pts	Sebastián Andrejev	Czech Republic	18 July 2026	2026 Championships	Rieti, Italy	17 years, 99 days	
110 m hurdles (91.4 cm)	13.52 (+0.7 m/s)	1037 pts	Tristan Konso	Estonia	21 July 2024	2024 Championships	Banská Bystrica, Slovakia	16 years, 230 days	
Discus throw (1.50 kg)	51.91 m	910 pts	Liam Belo da Silva	Sweden	21 July 2024	2024 Championships	Banská Bystrica, Slovakia	17 years, 22 days	
Pole vault	4.70 m		Lionel Brügger	Switzerland	7 July 2022	2022 Championships	Jerusalem, Israel		
Javelin throw (700 g)	68.66 m	869 pts	Anton Steffen	Germany	21 July 2024	2024 Championships	Banská Bystrica, Slovakia		
1500 m	4:24.83	779 pts	Denis Hrabar	Portugal	21 July 2024	2024 Championships	Banská Bystrica, Slovakia	17 years, 182 days	

=== Girls ===
Event	Record	Athlete	Nationality	Date	Meet	Place	Ref.
100 m	11.14 (+0.6 m/s) EYB	Kelly Doualla	Italy	17 July 2026	2026 Championships	Rieti, Italy	
200 m	23.09 (+1.0 m/s)	Elisa Valensin	Italy	20 July 2024	2024 Championships	Banská Bystrica, Slovakia	
400 m	51.89	Anastazja Kuś	Poland	20 July 2024	2024 Championships	Banská Bystrica, Slovakia	
800 m	2:03.77	Živa Remic	Slovenia	19 July 2026	2026 Championships	Rieti, Italy	
1500 m	4:13.01	Lyla Belshaw	Great Britain	21 July 2024	2024 Championships	Banská Bystrica, Slovakia	
3000 m	9:06.60	Aimie Decrausaz	Switzerland	19 July 2026	2026 Championships	Rieti, Italy	
100 m hurdles (76.2 cm)	12.86 (+2.0 m/s)	Laura Frličková	Slovakia	18 July 2024	2024 Championships	Banská Bystrica, Slovakia	
400 m hurdles	55.19 EU20R	Linda Botková	Czech Republic	19 July 2026	2026 Championships	Rieti, Italy	
2000 m steeplechase	6:20.22	Jolanda Kallabis	Germany	6 July 2022	2022 Championships	Jerusalem, Israel	
High jump	1.94 m	Yaroslava Mahuchikh	Ukraine	8 July 2018	2018 Championships	Győr, Hungary	
Pole vault	4.40 m	Julie Bourgis	France	19 July 2026	2026 Championships	Rieti, Italy	
Long jump	6.47 m (+0.4 m/s)	Kristýna Záhorová	Czech Republic	18 July 2026	2026 Championships	Rieti, Italy	
Triple jump	13.98 m (+1.6 m/s)	Viktoria Angelova	Bulgaria	19 July 2026	2026 Championships	Rieti, Italy	
Shot put (3 kg)	18.50 m	Alexandra Emelianova	Moldova	16 July 2016	2016 Championships	Tbilisi, Georgia	
Discus throw	58.09 m	Alexandra Emelianova	Moldova	15 July 2016	2016 Championships	Tbilisi, Georgia	
Hammer throw (3 kg)	74.36 m	Valeriya Ivanenko	Ukraine	5 July 2018	2018 Championships	Győr, Hungary	
Javelin throw (500 g)	61.07 m	Vita Barbić	Croatia	21 July 2024	2024 Championships	Banská Bystrica, Slovakia	
Heptathlon	6221 pts WYB	María Vicente	Spain	5–6 July 2018	2018 Championships	Győr, Hungary	
Heptathlon	100m H (wind) / High jump / Shot put / 200m (wind) / Long jump (wind) / Javelin / 800m; 13.25 (+0.1 m/s) / 1.72 m / 13.77 m / 23.78 (−0.3 m/s) / 6.37 m (+1.8 m/s) / 43.28 m / 2:23.29						
5000 m walk (track)	21:50.80	Serena Di Fabio	Italy	19 July 2024	2024 Championships	Banská Bystrica, Slovakia	
Swedish medley relay	2:05.23	Viola Canovi; Margherita Castellani; Laura Frattaroli; Elisa Valensin	Italy	21 July 2024	2024 Championships	Banská Bystrica, Slovakia	

==== Heptathlon disciplines ====
Event	Record	Score	Athlete	Nation	Date	Meet	Place	Age	Ref.
100 m hurdles (76.2 cm)	13.12 (−0.6 m/s)	1106 pts	Enni Virjonen	Finland	18 July 2024	2024 Championships	Banská Bystrica, Slovakia	17 years, 65 days	
High jump	1.88 m		Alina Shukh	Ukraine	14 July 2016	2016 Championships	Tbilisi, Georgia	17 years, 153 days	
Shot put (3 kg)	16.43 m	957 pts	Zola Ndouma-Mona	France	18 July 2024	2024 Championships	Banská Bystrica, Slovakia	17 years, 55 days	
200 m	23.65 (+1.2 m/s)	1015 pts	Evelina Olsson	Sweden	18 July 2024	2024 Championships	Banská Bystrica, Slovakia	16 years, 137 days	
Long jump	6.37 m		María Vicente	Spain	6 July 2018	2018 Championships	Győr, Hungary	17 years, 100 days	
Javelin throw (500 g)	51.59 m	891 pts	Enni Virjonen	Finland	19 July 2024	2024 Championships	Banská Bystrica, Slovakia	17 years, 66 days	
800 m	2:12.65		Niamh Emerson	Great Britain	15 July 2016	2016 Championships	Tbilisi, Georgia	17 years, 84 days	

== All-time medal table ==
Updated after 2026 European Athletics U18 Championships.

Rank	Nation	Gold	Silver	Bronze	Total
1	Great Britain	30	14	19	63
2	Italy	19	19	14	52
3	Germany	19	18	16	53
4	France	13	19	15	47
5	Czech Republic	13	8	8	29
6	Spain	11	14	15	40
7	Poland	9	11	13	33
8	Finland	8	4	10	22
9	Greece	7	6	6	19
10	Ukraine	7	4	1	12
11	Norway	6	6	4	16
12	Sweden	5	8	8	21
13	Netherlands	5	6	6	17
14	Belarus	5	3	1	9
15	Turkey	4	8	8	20
16	Ireland	4	6	5	15
17	Cyprus	4	1	1	6
18	Hungary	3	11	2	16
19	Switzerland	3	5	4	12
20	Romania	3	3	5	11
21	Bulgaria	3	3	4	10
22	Serbia	3	2	3	8
23	Belgium	2	4	2	8
24	Latvia	2	3	1	6
25	Croatia	2	2	5	9
26	Moldova	2	2	0	4
27	Slovakia	2	0	3	5
–	Authorised Neutral Athletes (ANA)^{[a]}	2	0	2	4
28	Denmark	2	0	1	3
29	Slovenia	1	3	1	5
30	Estonia	1	2	3	6
31	Iceland	1	0	1	2
32	Austria	0	3	6	9
33	Lithuania	0	2	1	3
34	Israel	0	2	0	2
35	Portugal	0	0	3	3
36	Azerbaijan	0	0	1	1
Totals (36 entries)		201	202	198	601

- ^[a] Medals won by athletes competing as Authorised Neutral Athletes were not included in the official medal table.
