= 2026 World Athletics U20 Championships – Women's 4 × 100 metres relay =

Women's 4 × 100 metres relay at the 2026 World Athletics U20 Championships
- Venue: Hayward Field
- Dates: 8 August (Round 1); 9 August (Final)
- Competitors: 100 from 24 nations
- Winning time: 42.89 WU20L

Medalists
gold medal	Sashana Johnson; Theianna-Lee Terrelonge; Natrece East; Shanoya Douglas; Samoya Brown*; Renecia Edwards*	Jamaica
silver medal	Mara Schwitter; Xenia Buri; Milla Tonazzi; Joy Umegbolu	Switzerland
bronze medal	Lore Foesters; Lauren Petroci-Coninx; Martha Geerardyn; Ilona Dhaenens	Belgium

The women's 4 × 100 metres relay at the 2026 World Athletics U20 Championships was held at Hayward Field in Eugene, United States on 8 and 9 August 2026.

== Records ==
U20 standing records prior to the 2026 World Athletics U20 Championships were as follows:

Record	Nation	Mark	Location	Date
World U20 Record	Jamaica	42.59	Cali, Colombia	5 August 2022
Championship Record	Jamaica	42.59	Cali, Colombia	5 August 2022
World U20 Leading	Switzerland	43.32	Fribourg, Switzerland	1 July 2026

== Results ==
=== Round 1 ===
Round 1 took place in the morning session on 8 August 2026. First 3 of each heat (Q) qualify to the final.

==== Heat 1 ====
Place	Lane	Nation	Athletes	Time	Notes
1	6	Switzerland	Mara Schwitter, Xenia Buri, Milla Tonazzi, Joy Umegbolu	43.99	Q
2	3	Belgium	Lore Foesters, Lauren Petroci-Coninx, Martha Geerardyn, Ilona Dhaenens	44.33	Q, NU20R
3	7	Spain	Maria Portela, Celia Cortes, Marina Delgado, Carla Aguirre	44.54	Q, NU20R
4	8	Poland	Marcelina Rozmys, Aleksandra Jeż, Oliwia Kasprzak, Maja Gondek	44.60	SB
5	5	Czech Republic	Klára Kaděrová, Eliška Matysová, Mia Plačková, Jolana Mitysková	44.75	
6	4	Estonia	Miia Ott, Mia Mireia Uusorg, Pia Lauren Matsalu, Ellen Ingrid Aadamsoo	45.64	NU20R
7	1	Slovakia	Nina Jarošová, Ema Bendová, Romana Hrncárová, Nina Hejčíková	45.66	
8	2	South Africa	Faith Konde, Ashlynn Norman, Sarah Reed, Chrystabel Davis	45.96	SB
9	9	Chile	Leonor Ferreiro, Pilar Rodríguez, Elisa Aguado, Roxana Ramírez	46.22	

==== Heat 2 ====
Place	Lane	Nation	Athletes	Time	Notes
1	4	Germany	Emma Goretzka, Lena Anochili, Mia Besser, Delisha Benelisa Domingos	44.09	Q
2	7	Trinidad and Tobago	Noemi Theodore, Imani Mills, Kaori Robley, Zada Charles	45.03 [.026]	Q
3	5	Canada	Elizabeth Tannis, Jordynn Scott, Tatiana Reyes, Victoria Zolaturiuk	45.03 [.028]	Q, SB
4	9	Hungary	Aliz Ács, Laura Zita Darai, Viktória Molnár, Sophia Akuchi Emmanuel	45.80	
5	6	Croatia	Jana Bujan, Lara Jelić, Nina Vrdoljak, Nevia Fotak	45.87	NU20R
6	2	India	Rujula Amol Bhonsle, Bhavana G, Aarti, Ananya Suresh	45.91	
7	8	China	Zhou Wenyu, Zhang Yuzheng, Zhou Zhenglin, Guo Siyang	46.79	
—	3	Brazil	Ana Julia Souza, Victoria Campos, Mariana Moreira, Hakelly de Souza	DNF	

==== Heat 3 ====
Place	Lane	Nation	Athletes	Time	Notes
1	9	Australia	Thewbelle Philp, Zara Hagan, Grace Crowe, Emilia Reed	43.44	Q, AU20R
2	4	Jamaica	Samoya Brown, Theianna-Lee Terrelonge, Natrece East, Renecia Edwards	43.61	Q, SB
3	7	Nigeria	Lucy Chiamaka Nwankwo, Chigozie Rosemary Nwankwo, Tejiri Praise Ugoh, Miracle Ezechukwu	43.65	Q, SB
4	8	United States	Madeline Cooper, Ava Kitchings, Sanyah Keeton, Naija Sizemore	43.67	SB
5	2	France	Soudatou Niang, Beatrice Tassin, Rose Djagbre, Diane Fréart	44.26	SB
6	6	Italy	Veronica Cioccoloni, Elisa Calzolari, Viola Canovi, Carlotta Suppini	44.61	SB
7	5	Slovenia	Urška Ogrizek, Tisa BožIč, Neja Mantelj, Katja Tomšič	45.36	PB

=== Final ===
The final took place in the afternoon session on 9 August 2026.

Place	Lane	Nation	Athletes	Time	Notes
1st place, gold medalist(s)	4	Jamaica	Sashana Johnson, Theianna-Lee Terrelonge, Natrece East, Shanoya Douglas	42.89	WU20L
2nd place, silver medalist(s)	7	Switzerland	Mara Schwitter, Xenia Buri, Milla Tonazzi, Joy Umegbolu	43.36	
3rd place, bronze medalist(s)	8	Belgium	Lore Foesters, Lauren Petroci-Coninx, Martha Geerardyn, Ilona Dhaenens	43.91	NU20R
4	5	Australia	Thewbelle Philp, Zara Hagan, Grace Crowe, Emilia Reed	44.01	
5	6	Germany	Emma Goretzka, Lena Anochili, Mia Besser, Delisha Benelisa Domingos	44.31	
6	2	Spain	Maria Portela, Celia Cortes, Marina Delgado, Carla Aguirre	44.63	
7	1	Canada	Elizabeth Tannis, Jordynn Scott, Tatiana Reyes, Victoria Zolaturiuk	44.64	SB
8	9	Trinidad and Tobago	Imani Mills, Noemi Theodore, Kayla Charles, Zada Charles	45.29	
—	3	Nigeria	Lucy Chiamaka Nwankwo, Success Oghene Oyibu, Chigozie Rosemary Nwankwo, Miracle Ezechukwu	DQ	TR16.8
