= Anna Švrček =

Slovak steeplechase runner (born 2008)

Personal information
- Born: 5 November 2008 (age 17) Tsuchiura, Ibaraki Prefecture, Japan

Sport
- Country: Slovakia
- Sport: Athletics
- Events: 3000 metres steeplechase, 2000 metres steeplechase, 1500 metres, 3000 metres
- Coached by: Ryō Kitani
- Updated on 10 August 2026

Anna Švrček (born 5 November 2008) is a Japanese-born Slovak track and field athlete who specialises in the 3000 metres steeplechase and in middle- and long-distance running. Born and raised in Japan to a Slovak father and a Bulgarian mother, she chose to represent Slovakia internationally from the 2026 season, having previously competed only in Japanese domestic competition. She is the Slovak national record holder in the 3000 metres steeplechase and was the first Slovak woman to contest the event at a global championship.

== Early life and background ==
Švrček was born in Tsuchiura in Ibaraki Prefecture and grew up in the same prefecture, attending high school in Ushiku. Her father, Vladimír Švrček, is a Slovak scientist from Podbranč in western Slovakia who has lived and worked in Japan for around two decades as a researcher at the National Institute of Advanced Industrial Science and Technology (AIST) in Tsukuba, where he works on hybrid solar cells. Her mother is Bulgarian.

The family speaks mainly Japanese and English at home. Švrček also speaks Bulgarian and, from 2026, began learning Slovak; she gave her first interviews in the language during the 2026 season.

She came to the steeplechase during the COVID-19 pandemic, when her father brought a hurdle home and had her practise water-jump technique over a concrete ledge beside the house. Her coach in Japan moved her from combined events and short hurdles towards distance running.

== Career ==
=== 2025 ===
Švrček first appeared in international statistics during 2025, when performances began to be listed against a Slovak flag despite the Slovak Athletic Federation (SAZ) having no record of her as a member.

In June 2025 she ran 9:12.48 for 3000 metres at the Kanseki Stadium in Utsunomiya. At the end of September she won the Japanese U20 championships in Shizuoka in the 3000 metres steeplechase in 9:57.11, leading from start to finish and setting a Japanese high school record; the time was more than half a minute faster than the then-existing Slovak national record of 10:34.02 set by Kristína Guttmannová-Protičová in 2004. In early October she won the 2000 metres steeplechase at the National Sports Festival in 6:27.03, again a Japanese high school record.

She finished the 2025 season as the world U18 year-end leader in both steeplechase distances, and was the only under-18 athlete in the world to run under ten minutes for the 3000 metres steeplechase that year.

=== Switch of allegiance ===
After contact was established with her father late in the season, Švrček agreed to represent Slovakia and was registered as an individual member of the Slovak Athletic Federation on 25 November 2025, three weeks after her seventeenth birthday. SAZ general secretary Vladimír Gubrický said that other federations had also been interested in her.

At the time of registration her personal bests in three events were already inside the qualifying standards for the 2026 World Athletics U20 Championships.

=== 2026 ===
In February 2026 Švrček made her half marathon debut at Moriya, running 1:13:23 to move to second on the Slovak women's all-time list, around half a minute behind the national record of Ľudmila Melicherová.

On 11 April 2026 in Kumamoto she ran 10:23.85 for the 3000 metres steeplechase, her first officially recognised Slovak national record. On 3 May at the Ecopa Stadium in Fukuroi she improved the record to 9:59.84, taking a further 24 seconds off the mark and becoming the first Slovak woman to run the event inside ten minutes; she finished fourth in the race. Later that month she set a personal best of 4:18.48 for 1500 metres in Tokyo.

==== World U20 Championships ====
Švrček made her competitive debut at the 2026 World Athletics U20 Championships in Eugene, Oregon, held from 5 to 9 August 2026, as part of the Slovak team.

In her heat of the 3000 metres steeplechase she led the chasing group for much of the race before fading in the final kilometre, holding off late attacks to finish sixth in 10:14.91 and qualify for the final; she was ranked eleventh overall from 27 starters. In the final on 8 August she improved by exactly nine seconds to 10:05.91 and placed ninth in a sixteen-woman field. The title was won by Ethiopian Almaz Yohannis in a world U20 season's best of 9:15.81, ahead of her compatriot Wosane Asefa (9:30.50) and Kenyan Anatasha Cheptoo (9:37.18).

Švrček was the first Slovak woman to compete in the steeplechase at a global U20 championship.

== Reception in Slovakia ==
Švrček's championship debut attracted unusual public attention in Slovakia, where she had been effectively unknown a year earlier. Interviews she gave in Slovak — a language she had only recently begun to learn — circulated widely on social media, with commentators singling out her enthusiasm about competing for the country and her account of hearing spectators shouting encouragement to her in Eugene.

== Personal bests ==
Event	Time	Venue	Date	Notes
1500 metres	4:18.48	Tokyo, Japan	30 May 2026	
3000 metres	9:12.48	Utsunomiya, Japan	16 June 2025	
5000 metres	16:14.82	Ryūgasaki, Japan	2026	
Half marathon	1:13:23	Moriya, Japan	February 2026	
2000 metres steeplechase	6:27.03	Japan	3 October 2025	Slovak NU18R
3000 metres steeplechase	9:57.11	Shizuoka, Japan	27 September 2025	Listed by World Athletics as NR

Information from World Athletics profile unless otherwise noted.

== Competition record ==
Representing Slovakia
Year	Competition	Venue	Position	Event	Time	Notes
2026	World U20 Championships	Eugene, United States	9th	3000 m steeplechase	10:05.91	
