= 2026 World Athletics U20 Championships – Women's 200 metres =

Women's 200 metres at the 2026 World Athletics U20 Championships
- Venue: Hayward Field
- Dates: 7 August (Round 1 & Semi-finals); 8 August (Final)
- Competitors: 75 from 51 nations
- Winning time: 22.37

Medalists
gold medal	Mia Maxwell	United States
silver medal	Shanoya Douglas	Jamaica
bronze medal	Mariah Maxwell	United States

The women's 200 metres at the 2026 World Athletics U20 Championships was held at Hayward Field in Eugene, United States on 7 and 8 August 2026.

== Records ==
U20 standing records prior to the 2026 World Athletics U20 Championships were as follows:

Record	Athlete & Nationality	Mark	Location	Date
World U20 Record	Christine Mboma (NAM)	21.81	Tokyo, Japan	3 August 2021
Championship Record	Christine Mboma (NAM)	21.84	Nairobi, Kenya	21 August 2021
World U20 Leading	Shanoya Douglas (JAM)	22.11	St. George, Grenada	6 April 2026

== Results ==
=== Round 1 ===
Round 1 took place in the morning session on 7 August 2026.

==== Heat 1 ====
Place	Lane	Athlete	Nation	Time	Notes
1	8	Sashana Johnson	Jamaica	22.95	Q, PB
2	4	Tyra Fenton	Antigua and Barbuda	23.15	Q, SB
3	6	Tatiana Reyes	Canada	23.38	q, PB
4	7	Sophia Akuchi Emmanuel	Hungary	23.49	q, PB
5	3	Ema Bendová	Slovakia	23.51	q, NU20R
6	9	Hannah Rebekah Murai-Ubby	Norway	24.00	
7	5	Olivia Conesa	Argentina	24.40 [.392]	
8	2	Sin Ting Yau	Hong Kong	24.40 [.398]	
				Wind: (+0.5 m/s)	

==== Heat 2 ====
Place	Lane	Athlete	Nation	Time	Notes
1	8	Mia Maxwell	United States	23.30	Q
2	9	Milla Tonazzi	Switzerland	23.57	Q
3	4	Kendra Scally-Tu'i	New Zealand	23.58	q, PB
4	5	Rose Djagbre	France	23.86	q
5	1	Anne Böcker	Germany	23.92 [.918]	
6	3	Nina Hejčíková	Slovakia	23.92 [.920]	
7	2	Neja Mantelj	Slovenia	24.14	
8	7	Salsabil Bounemeur	Algeria	24.64	
9	6	Hephzibah Romalus	Papua New Guinea	26.21	SB
				Wind: (+0.8 m/s)	

==== Heat 3 ====
Place	Lane	Athlete	Nation	Time	Notes
1	9	Shanoya Douglas	Jamaica	22.88	Q
2	5	Beatrice Tassin	France	23.50	Q
3	7	Zofia Pasierbek	Poland	23.87	q
4	8	Thea Parnis Coleiro	Malta	24.09	SB
5	3	Nevia Fotak	Croatia	24.31	
6	4	Hoshi Fatihah Azharah	Indonesia	24.60	
7	1	Mariliza Pittaka	Cyprus	24.79	
8	2	Ahnaa Nizaar	Maldives	24.91	
9	6	Ariel Archer	Barbados	DQ	TR17.2.3
				Wind: (−0.3 m/s)	

==== Heat 4 ====
Place	Lane	Athlete	Nation	Time	Notes
1	3	Sophie Thomas	Great Britain	23.53	Q
2	2	Margherita Castellani	Italy	23.54	Q, SB
3	9	Hakelly de Souza	Brazil	23.56	q
4	6	Aude Bogui	Ivory Coast	23.91	PB
5	5	Laura Zita Darai	Hungary	24.10	PB
6	7	Nina Vrdoljak	Croatia	24.21	PB
7	8	Zhou Zhenglin	China	24.25	
8	4	De'Cheynelle Thomas	Saint Kitts and Nevis	24.58	
				Wind: (+0.1 m/s)	

==== Heat 5 ====
Place	Lane	Athlete	Nation	Time	Notes
1	7	Filippa Engström	Sweden	23.50	Q, PB
2	2	Mia Besser	Germany	23.84	Q
3	6	Zara Hagan	Australia	23.93	
4	3	Pilar Rodríguez	Chile	24.34	
5	5	Sarah Reed	South Africa	24.38	
6	8	Tisa BožIč	Slovenia	24.50	
7	9	Simone Bessong	Cameroon	24.77	
8	4	Zhang Yuzheng	China	24.87	
				Wind: (−0.8 m/s)	

==== Heat 6 ====
Place	Lane	Athlete	Nation	Time	Notes
1	4	Rume Burger	South Africa	23.17	Q, PB
2	9	Jamilia Bernhardsson	Sweden	23.20	Q
3	5	Elisa Valensin	Italy	23.27	q, SB
4	2	Kaori Robley	Trinidad and Tobago	24.00	
5	7	Same Amantle Mhutsiwa	Botswana	24.08	SB
6	8	Dilanma Perera Pathirana	Sri Lanka	24.25	
7	6	Katerina Karagianni	Cyprus	24.39	
8	3	Mia de Jager	New Zealand	24.70	
				Wind: (+0.3 m/s)	

==== Heat 7 ====
Place	Lane	Athlete	Nation	Time	Notes
1	2	Success Oghene Oyibu	Nigeria	23.04	Q
2	6	Saige Demeritte	Bahamas	23.31	Q, PB
3	4	Maria Portela	Spain	23.43	q
4	7	Dianelis Rivera	Puerto Rico	23.88	
5	3	Radina Velichkova	Bulgaria	23.97	
6	9	Diana Indeque	Portugal	24.10	PB
7	5	Daquana Howell	Cayman Islands	24.13	
8	8	Ivana McFarlane	Panama	24.54	
				Wind: (+1.1 m/s)	

==== Heat 8 ====
Place	Lane	Athlete	Nation	Time	Notes
1	4	Mariah Maxwell	United States	23.37	Q
2	5	Imani Mills	Trinidad and Tobago	23.75	Q
3	3	Breanne Sydney Barnett	Haiti	24.18 [.177]	
4	7	Leana Stadler	Switzerland	24.18 [.178]	
5	2	Victoria Campos	Brazil	24.29	
6	8	Kaisa Sol Fagerland	Norway	24.38	
7	9	Kettia Ambrose	Antigua and Barbuda	24.61	
8	6	Emily Román	Colombia	24.67	
9	1	Zeinab Doumbia	Mali	25.60	
				Wind: (±0.0 m/s)	

==== Heat 9 ====
Place	Lane	Athlete	Nation	Time	Notes
1	7	Miracle Ezechukwu	Nigeria	23.34	Q
2	5	Amaya Mearns	Australia	23.70	Q
3	3	Victoria Zolaturiuk	Canada	23.95	
4	4	Risansa Hirupama Kadupiti	Sri Lanka	24.11	
5	8	Una Jovanović	Serbia	24.13	SB
6	2	Roxana Ramírez	Chile	24.24	
7	9	Eir Hlésdóttir	Iceland	24.32 [.313]	
8	6	Ronja Christophersen	Denmark	24.32 [.319]	PB
				Wind: (−0.5 m/s)	

=== Semi-finals ===
Semi-finals took place in the afternoon session on 7 August 2026.

==== Heat 1 ====
Place	Lane	Athlete	Nation	Time	Notes
1	7	Mia Maxwell	United States	22.87	Q
2	8	Sashana Johnson	Jamaica	22.92	Q, PB
3	9	Margherita Castellani	Italy	22.99	Q, NU20R
4	5	Filippa Engström	Sweden	23.35	PB
5	3	Tatiana Reyes	Canada	23.44	
6	6	Saige Demeritte	Bahamas	23.49	
7	2	Rose Djagbre	France	23.56	
8	1	Ema Bendová	Slovakia	23.58	
9	4	Imani Mills	Trinidad and Tobago	23.74	
				Wind: (+1.2 m/s)	

==== Heat 2 ====
Place	Lane	Athlete	Nation	Time	Notes
1	8	Shanoya Douglas	Jamaica	22.53	Q
2	6	Mariah Maxwell	United States	22.78	Q
3	5	Jamilia Bernhardsson	Sweden	23.12	Q, PB
4	9	Elisa Valensin	Italy	23.23	SB
5	4	Beatrice Tassin	France	23.27	PB
6	1	Hakelly de Souza	Brazil	23.60	
7	3	Mia Besser	Germany	23.78	
8	2	Kendra Scally-Tu'i	New Zealand	23.83	
—	7	Miracle Ezechukwu	Nigeria	DQ	TR17.2.3
				Wind: (+0.5 m/s)	

==== Heat 3 ====
Place	Lane	Athlete	Nation	Time	Notes
1	8	Success Oghene Oyibu	Nigeria	23.13	Q
2	6	Rume Burger	South Africa	23.18	Q
3	7	Tyra Fenton	Antigua and Barbuda	23.25	Q
4	9	Amaya Mearns	Australia	23.49	
5	5	Sophie Thomas	Great Britain	23.52	
6	4	Milla Tonazzi	Switzerland	23.72	
7	3	Maria Portela	Spain	23.76	
8	1	Zofia Pasierbek	Poland	23.79	
9	2	Sophia Akuchi Emmanuel	Hungary	24.02	
				Wind: (+0.3 m/s)	

=== Final ===
The final took place in the afternoon session on 8 August 2026.

Place	Lane	Athlete	Nation	Time	Notes
1st place, gold medalist(s)	5	Mia Maxwell	United States	22.37	PB
2nd place, silver medalist(s)	6	Shanoya Douglas	Jamaica	22.68	
3rd place, bronze medalist(s)	7	Mariah Maxwell	United States	22.77	
4	3	Sashana Johnson	Jamaica	23.17	
5	8	Success Oghene Oyibu	Nigeria	23.27	
6	4	Margherita Castellani	Italy	23.28	
7	1	Jamilia Bernhardsson	Sweden	23.39 [.383]	
8	9	Rume Burger	South Africa	23.39 [.386]	
9	2	Tyra Fenton	Antigua and Barbuda	23.52	
				Wind: (−0.2 m/s)	
