= 2026 World Athletics U20 Championships – Women's 100 metres =

Women's 100 metres at the 2026 World Athletics U20 Championships
- Venue: Hayward Field
- Dates: 5 August (Round 1 & Semi-finals); 6 August (Final)
- Competitors: 65 from 46 nations
- Winning time: 11.14

Medalists
gold medal	Mia Maxwell	United States
silver medal	Shanoya Douglas	Jamaica
bronze medal	Kelly Doualla	Italy

The women's 100 metres at the 2026 World Athletics U20 Championships was held at Hayward Field in Eugene, United States on 5 and 6 August 2026.

== Records ==
U20 standing records prior to the 2026 World Athletics U20 Championships were as follows:

Record	Athlete & Nationality	Mark	Location	Date
World U20 Record	Marlies Oelsner (GDR)	10.88	Dresden, Germany	1 July 1977
Championship Record	Tina Clayton (JAM)	10.95	Cali, Colombia	3 August 2022
World U20 Leading	Shanoya Douglas (JAM)	10.98	Kingston, Jamaica	25 March 2026

== Results ==
=== Round 1 ===
Round 1 took place in the morning session on 5 August 2026. The first 3 of each heat (Q) plus 3 fastest times (q) qualify to the semi-finals.

==== Heat 1 ====
Place	Lane	Athlete	Nation	Time	Notes
1	7	Shanoya Douglas	Jamaica	11.35	Q
2	5	Klára Kaděrová	Czech Republic	11.56	Q
3	3	Rume Burger	South Africa	11.56	Q
4	8	Maria Portela	Spain	11.72	
5	9	Roxana Ramírez	Chile	11.74	
6	4	Lara Jelić	Croatia	11.91	
7	2	Olivia Conesa	Argentina	12.07	
8	6	Mariam Messaykeh	Lebanon	12.70	
				Wind: (+0.4 m/s)	

==== Heat 2 ====
Place	Lane	Athlete	Nation	Time	Notes
1	7	Jady Emmanuel	Saint Lucia	11.28	Q, PB
2	4	Athaleyha Hinckson	Guyana	11.31	Q
3	1	Maya Taber	Australia	11.39	Q
4	2	Uliana Stepaniuk	Ukraine	11.61	
5	8	Milagros D'Amico	Argentina	11.77	
6	6	Victoria Campos	Brazil	11.87	
7	5	Romana Hrncárová	Slovakia	11.89	
8	3	Chloe Alexandrine	Mauritius	11.98	PB
				Wind: (+1.9 m/s)	

==== Heat 3 ====
Place	Lane	Athlete	Nation	Time	Notes
1	4	Mariah Maxwell	United States	11.33	Q
2	6	Ema Bendová	Slovakia	11.55	Q
3	2	Chigozie Rosemary Nwankwo	Nigeria	11.57	Q
4	3	Oliwia Kasprzak	Poland	11.61	
5	1	Kendra Scally-Tu'i	New Zealand	11.68 [.678]	
6	8	Filippa Engström	Sweden	11.68 [.680]	
7	5	Christina Alba Marcus Hafliðadóttir	Iceland	12.24	
8	7	Shelly Nyana Reyes	Nicaragua	12.42	
				Wind: (−0.2 m/s)	

==== Heat 4 ====
Place	Lane	Athlete	Nation	Time	Notes
1	4	Theianna-Lee Terrelonge	Jamaica	11.21	Q
2	8	Emma Goretzka	Germany	11.29	Q
3	7	Elizabeth Tannis	Canada	11.54	Q
4	3	Imani Mills	Trinidad and Tobago	11.57	q
5	2	Urška Ogrizek	Slovenia	11.70	PB
6	1	Emily Román	Colombia	11.85	
7	6	Sophie Dimitrov	Bulgaria	12.01	
8	5	Ivana McFarlane	Panama	12.23	
				Wind: (+1.2 m/s)	

==== Heat 5 ====
Place	Lane	Athlete	Nation	Time	Notes
1	7	Xenia Buri	Switzerland	11.38	Q
2	2	Maja Gondek	Poland	11.59	Q
3	5	Lily Bradley	Great Britain	11.63	Q
4	6	Miia Ott	Estonia	11.64	SB
5	3	Lucy Chiamaka Nwankwo	Nigeria	11.77	
6	1	Ieva ŠadžIūtė	Lithuania	11.83	
7	4	Rihana Mora	Costa Rica	11.85	
8	8	Cayetana Chirinos	Peru	11.99	
				Wind: (±0.0 m/s)	

==== Heat 6 ====
Place	Lane	Athlete	Nation	Time	Notes
1	3	Mia Maxwell	United States	11.37	Q
2	6	Hakelly de Souza	Brazil	11.53	Q, SB
3	5	Jolana Mitysková	Czech Republic	11.66	Q
4	7	Celia Cortes	Spain	11.68	
5	8	Carolina-Andreea Pungă	Romania	11.74	
6	1	Radina Velichkova	Bulgaria	11.81	
7	4	Zhang Yuzheng	China	12.15	
8	2	Leah Pool	Seychelles	12.41	
				Wind: (−0.1 m/s)	

==== Heat 7 ====
Place	Lane	Athlete	Nation	Time	Notes
1	4	Zara Hagan	Australia	11.40	Q
2	3	Alexxe Henry	Trinidad and Tobago	11.55	Q
3	2	Carlotta Suppini	Italy	11.57 [.566]	Q, PB
4	5	Kerelle Etienne	Dominica	11.57 [.568]	q
5	6	Faith Konde	South Africa	11.85	
6	7	Thea Parnis Coleiro	Malta	11.89	
7	1	Tia Porteous	Canada	12.02	
8	8	Simone Bessong	Cameroon	12.03	
				Wind: (+1.9 m/s)	

==== Heat 8 ====
Place	Lane	Athlete	Nation	Time	Notes
1	5	Kelly Doualla	Italy	11.35	Q
2	1	Lena Anochili	Germany	11.41	Q
3	7	Aniya Nurse	Barbados	11.44	Q
4	8	Mara Schwitter	Switzerland	11.55	q, PB
5	6	Apostolia Antonatou	Greece	11.64	
6	3	Izzatul Musfirah Binti Ahmad Kamal	Malaysia	11.72	
7	4	Ana-Maria Dogan	Romania	11.74	PB
8	2	Katerina Karagianni	Cyprus	11.77	
				Wind: (+0.9 m/s)	

=== Semi-finals ===
The semi-finals took place in the afternoon session on 5 August 2026. The first 3 in each heat (Q) advanced to the final.

==== Heat 1 ====
Place	Lane	Athlete	Nation	Time	Notes
1	6	Kelly Doualla	Italy	11.36	Q
2	4	Jady Emmanuel	Saint Lucia	11.42	Q
3	7	Lena Anochili	Germany	11.47	Q
4	2	Rume Burger	South Africa	11.53	
5	3	Ema Bendová	Slovakia	11.56	
6	8	Aniya Nurse	Barbados	11.58	
7	9	Lily Bradley	Great Britain	11.63	
8	1	Imani Mills	Trinidad and Tobago	11.67	
9	5	Zara Hagan	Australia	11.72	
				Wind: (−0.2 m/s)	

==== Heat 2 ====
Place	Lane	Athlete	Nation	Time	Notes
1	6	Mia Maxwell	United States	11.13	Q
2	4	Theianna-Lee Terrelonge	Jamaica	11.21	Q
3	5	Xenia Buri	Switzerland	11.23	Q
4	2	Elizabeth Tannis	Canada	11.55	
5	7	Hakelly de Souza	Brazil	11.56 [.551]	
6	8	Maya Taber	Australia	11.56 [.556]	
7	1	Jolana Mitysková	Czech Republic	11.58	
8	3	Alexxe Henry	Trinidad and Tobago	11.61	
9	9	Kerelle Etienne	Dominica	11.67	
				Wind: (+0.4 m/s)	

==== Heat 3 ====
Place	Lane	Athlete	Nation	Time	Notes
1	4	Shanoya Douglas	Jamaica	11.21	Q
2	6	Mariah Maxwell	United States	11.25	Q
3	5	Emma Goretzka	Germany	11.40	Q, NUR20R
4	7	Athaleyha Hinckson	Guyana	11.50	
5	2	Chigozie Rosemary Nwankwo	Nigeria	11.54	
6	9	Carlotta Suppini	Italy	11.64	
7	3	Klára Kaděrová	Czech Republic	11.65	
8	8	Maja Gondek	Poland	11.66	
9	1	Mara Schwitter	Switzerland	11.68	
				Wind: (+0.1 m/s)	

=== Final ===
The final took place in the afternoon session on 6 August 2026.

Place	Lane	Athlete	Nation	Time	Notes
1st place, gold medalist(s)	5	Mia Maxwell	United States	11.14	
2nd place, silver medalist(s)	6	Shanoya Douglas	Jamaica	11.17	
3rd place, bronze medalist(s)	4	Kelly Doualla	Italy	11.27	
4	2	Xenia Buri	Switzerland	11.33	
5	7	Mariah Maxwell	United States	11.35	
6	3	Theianna-Lee Terrelonge	Jamaica	11.37	
7	1	Emma Goretzka	Germany	11.42	
8	8	Jady Emmanuel	Saint Lucia	11.47	
9	9	Lena Anochili	Germany	11.63	
				Wind: (−0.1 m/s)	
