= Wes Porter =

American middle-distance runner

Personal information
- Full name: Wesley Porter
- Born: 18 September 2001 (age 24)

Sport
- Sport: Athletics
- Event(s): Middle-distance running, Cross country running
- College team: Virginia Cavaliers
- Club: Under Armour Mission Run Baltimore
- Turned pro: 2025
- Coached by: Vin Lananna (2020-2025); Cory Leslie (2025-)

Achievements and titles
- Personal best(s): 800 m: 1:49.42 (Virginia Beach, 2025); 1500 m: 3:35.02 (Los Angeles, 2025); Mile: 3:50.37 (Boston, 2026); 3000 m: 7:42.42 (Boston, 2026); 5000 m: 13:36.84 (Charlottesville, 2022)

Wesley Porter (born 18 September 2001) is an American middle-distance and cross country runner.

== Career ==
Porter was educated at Rockhurst High School in Kansas City, Missouri. He was awarded the 2019-20 Gatorade Missouri Boys Cross Country Runner of the Year. That year, he signed a letter to intent for the University of Virginia.

In October 2025, Porter ran 29:30 to win over 10 km at the Baltimore Marathon Running Festival. In June 2024, Porter finished sixth over 1500 metres at the 2024 NCAA Outdoor Championships. He then ran a personal best 3:35.63 for that distance at the Portland Track Festival on 10 June. That time qualified him for the 2024 USA Olympic Trials later that month, where he was a semi-finalist.

Alongside Virginia Cavaliers teammates Gary Martin, Alexander Sherman and Connor Murphy, Porter ran a new collegiate record for the distance medley relay at the Arkansas Qualifier on 21 February 2025, with Porter running the 1200 metres leg. The team ran 9:14.19 to break the previous record set by Oklahoma State in 2023. The following month, the same quartet won the men's distance medley relay at the 2025 NCAA Indoor Track and Field Championships for Virginia.

Porter placed second behind Ethan Strand in the 2 km race at the 2025 USA Cross Country Championships to gain automatic selection for the mixed relay race at the 2026 World Athletics Cross Country Championships in Tallahassee alongside Strand, Gracie Morris and Sage Hurta-Klecker, where the team placed fifth overall on 10 January 2026 with Porter running the second fastest split time from the competitors on his leg of the race. On 24 January 2026, Porter placed second in the mile run at the Dr. Sander Scorcher in New York. On 13 February, Porter ran the tenth fastest indoor mile by an American in 3:50.37 at the BU Valentine in Boston. On 1 March 2026, he was a finalist in the 1500 metres at the 2026 USA Indoor Track and Field Championships, placing sixth overall.
