= 2026 World Athletics U20 Championships – Women's 3000 metres steeplechase =

Women's 3000 metres steeplechase at the 2026 World Athletics U20 Championships
- Venue: Hayward Field
- Dates: 5 August (Round 1); 7 August (Final)
- Competitors: 27 from 20 nations
- Winning time: 9:15.81

Medalists
gold medal	Almaz Yohannis	Ethiopia
silver medal	Wosane Asefa	Ethiopia
bronze medal	Anatasha Cheptoo	Kenya

The women's 3000 metres steeplechase at the 2026 World Athletics U20 Championships was held at Hayward Field in Eugene, United States on 5 and 7 August 2026.

== Records ==
U20 standing records prior to the 2026 World Athletics U20 Championships were as follows:

Record	Athlete & Nationality	Mark	Location	Date
World U20 Record	Celliphine Chespol (KEN)	8:58.78	Eugene, United States	26 May 2017
Championship Record	Sembo Almayew (ETH)	9:12.71	Lima, Peru	29 August 2024
World U20 Leading	Mercy Chepngeno Kosgei (KEN)	9:30.47	Accra, Ghana	17 May 2026

== Results ==
=== Round 1 ===
Round 1 took place in the afternoon session on 5 August 2026. First 8 of each heat (Q) qualify to the final.

==== Heat 1 ====
Place	Athlete	Nation	Time	Notes
1	Mercy Chepngeno Kosgei	Kenya	9:36.19	Q
2	Wosane Asefa	Ethiopia	9:56.36	Q
3	Fanny Szalkai	Sweden	9:57.93	Q, PB
4	Rei Taya	Japan	10:09.73	Q, SB
5	Ema Berková	Czech Republic	10:13.69	Q
6	Malak Abdul-Ghani Abdullah Ibrahim	Egypt	10:15.40	Q
7	Zuzanna Szymańska	Poland	10:17.40	Q, PB
8	Lara Roque	Portugal	10:20.25	Q, NU20R
9	Tilly Nickell	Great Britain	10:25.12	
10	Lena Rossmanith	Germany	10:29.47	
11	Bella Nelson	United States	10:44.05	
12	Tessa Ebert	Australia	10:45.87	
	Caitlin Kirk	New Zealand	DNF	

==== Heat 2 ====
Place	Athlete	Nation	Time	Notes
1	Almaz Yohannis	Ethiopia	9:42.45	Q
2	Anatasha Cheptoo	Kenya	9:51.02	Q
3	Anna Dafni Almyroudi Stroumpou	Greece	10:06.37	Q, NU20R
4	Michalina Thamm	Poland	10:06.68	Q, PB
5	Majken Söderlund Larsson	Sweden	10:06.96	Q
6	Anna Švrček	Slovakia	10:14.91	Q
7	Sierra Wall	United States	10:14.92	Q
8	Ava James	Great Britain	10:15.16	Q
9	Daria Dubenets	Ukraine	10:18.30	PB
10	Amaja Rahm	Switzerland	10:19.82	NU20R
11	Kamilah Arianna Salim	Hungary	10:28.14	
12	Dearbhla Allen	Ireland	10:38.18	
13	Bronwen Rees-Jones	New Zealand	11:03.60	
14	Adéle Martin	France	11:27.40	

=== Final ===
The final took place in the afternoon session on 7 August 2026.

Place	Athlete	Nation	Time	Notes
1st place, gold medalist(s)	Almaz Yohannis	Ethiopia	9:15.81	WU20L
2nd place, silver medalist(s)	Wosane Asefa	Ethiopia	9:30.50	PB
3rd place, bronze medalist(s)	Anatasha Cheptoo	Kenya	9:37.18	
4	Majken Söderlund Larsson	Sweden	9:48.01	NU20R
5	Ema Berková	Czech Republic	9:49.06	NU20R
6	Fanny Szalkai	Sweden	9:55.06	PB
7	Anna Dafni Almyroudi Stroumpou	Greece	10:00.63	NU20R
8	Malak Abdul-Ghani Abdullah Ibrahim	Egypt	10:04.52	NR
9	Anna Švrček	Slovakia	10:05.91	
10	Rei Taya	Japan	10:12.37	
11	Lara Roque	Portugal	10:15.69	NU20R
12	Zuzanna Szymańska	Poland	10:15.94	PB
13	Ava James	Great Britain	10:18.96	
14	Sierra Wall	United States	10:21.21	
15	Michalina Thamm	Poland	10:39.01	
—	Mercy Chepngeno Kosgei	Kenya	DNF	
