= 2026 African Championships in Athletics – Women's 3000 metres steeplechase =

Women's 3000 metres steeplechase at the 2026 African Championships in Athletics
- Venue: Legon Sports Stadium
- Location: Accra, Ghana
- Dates: 17 May
- Competitors: 8 from 6 nations
- Winning time: 9:29.19

Medalists
gold medal	Diana Chepkemoi	Kenya
silver medal	Mercy Chepngeno	Kenya
bronze medal	Almaz Yohannis	Ethiopia

The women's 3000 metres steeplechase event at the 2026 African Championships in Athletics was held on 17 May in Accra, Ghana.

== Results ==
Rank	Athlete	Nationality	Time	Notes
1st place, gold medalist(s)	Diana Chepkemoi	Kenya	9:29.19	
2nd place, silver medalist(s)	Mercy Chepngeno	Kenya	9:30.47	
3rd place, bronze medalist(s)	Almaz Yohannis	Ethiopia	9:33.46	
4	Wosane Asefa	Ethiopia	9:41.76	
5	Nancy Chepkwurui	Uganda	10:00.84	
6	Rihab Dhahri	Tunisia	10:13.15	
7	Malak Abdelghany	Egypt	10:16.19	
8	Carina Swiegers	South Africa	10:41.89	
	Mercy Mageso Chepngeno	Kenya	DNS	
	Aderonke Akanbi	Nigeria	DNS	
