= Jessica Mercier =

American pole vaulter (born 2000)

Personal information
- Nationality: United States
- Born: June 10, 2000 (age 26) Waterford Township, Michigan, U.S.
- Home town: White Lake, Michigan
- Education: University of Michigan College of Engineering 1922 BSE Chemical Engineering; Indiana University Bloomington 1924 MS Public and Environmental Affairs

Sport
- Sport: Athletics; Track and Field
- Event: Pole vault

Achievements and titles
- World finals: 2026
- Personal bests: Pole vault: 4.57 m (15 ft 0 in) (2026)
Medal record
Women's athletics
Representing United States
World Athletics Indoor Championships
2026 Poland	Pole vault

Jessica Mercier (born June 10, 2000) is an American pole vaulter. She was selected to represent the United States at the 2026 World Athletics Indoor Championships.

== Early life ==
Mercier graduated from Waterford Kettering High School in Michigan in 2018.

Mercier vaulted 3.05 m (10 ft 0 in) to place 13th at the 2016 Michigan High School Athletic Association State Indoor Track and Field High School Championships. Mercier vaulted 3.43 m (11 ft 3 in) to place 5th at the 2016 Michigan High School Athletic Association State Outdoor Track and Field High School Championships.

Mercier vaulted 4.04 m (13 ft 3 in) to win 2018 New Balance Invitational in North Farmington High School in Michigan setting a school record at Waterford Kettering High School.

== NCAA ==
Mercier went on to compete for the University of Michigan and Indiana University Bloomington as a graduate student.

Mercier vaulted 4.45 m (14 ft 7 in) to set a school record at 2024 Big Ten Conference Track and Field Championships where she earned a silver medal.

Mercier vaulted 4.20 m (13 ft 9 in) at 2024 United States Olympic trials to place 20th.

== Professional career ==
Mercier set a personal best of 4.57 m (15 ft 0 in) in January 2026 in Indianapolis.

Mercier placed second to Chloe Timberg at the 2026 USA Indoor Track and Field Championships in Staten Island, New York in February 2026, clearing 4.55 m (14 ft 11 in). She was selected to represent the United States at the 2026 World Athletics Indoor Championships in Toruń, Poland.

Jessica Mercier works as a battery researcher and engineer in Indiana since 2024.
