= Sashana Johnson =

Jamsican sprinter

Personal information
- Born: 3 October 2008 (age 17)

Sport
- Sport: Athletics
- Event: Sprint
Medal record
Women's athletics
Representing Jamaica
World U20 Championships
Gold medal – first place	2026 Eugene	4×100 m relay

Sashana Johnson (born 3 October 2008) is a Jamaican sprinter.

== Early life and education ==
Johnson was educated at Hydel High School.

== Career ==
Johnson was selected to represent Jamaica at the 2026 World Athletics U20 Championships in August 2026 in Eugene, USA. Reaching the final of the 200 metres at the championships, Johnson ran back-to-back personal best times and placed fourth overall. She won a gold medal with the women's 4 x 100 metres relay team.
