= Temoso Masikane =

South African long jumper

Personal information
- Born: 26 April 2006 (age 20)

Sport
- Sport: Athletics
- Event: Long jump

Achievements and titles
- Personal best(s): Long jump: 8.11m (Fayetteville, 2026); Triple jump: 16.03m (Abeokuta, 2025)
Medal record
Men's athletics
Representing South Africa
African U20 Championships
Gold medal – first place	2025 Abeokuta	Triple jump
African U18 Championships
Gold medal – first place	2023 Ndola	Long jump

Temoso Masikane (born 26 April 2006) is a South African long jumper and triple jumper. He became the African U18 champion in the long jump in 2023, and in 2025 became the African U20 champion in the triple jump, also placing second at the senior South African Athletics Championships that year.

== Biography ==
Masikane attended Lebone II - College of the Royal Bafokeng International school in South Africa. He won both the long jump and 100 metres titles at the 2023 South African School Sports Championships in Germiston. That year, Masikane made his debut representing South Africa and set a new African under-18 area record with a long jump of 8.06 metres to win the gold medal at the 2023 African U18 Championships in Ndola, Zambia. He had gone into the championships already holding the South African U18 national record for the discipline.

The following year, competing as a member of Athletics North West North (ANWN), Masikane won the U20 men’s long jump final at the ASA Championships in March 2024, winning with a jump of 7.71m. Masikane placed fourth overall in the long jump at the 2024 World Athletics U20 Championships in Lima, Peru, in August 2024, with a best jump of 7.74 metres.

In April 2025, Masikane was runner-up in the triple jump at the senior South African Athletics Championships in Potchefstroom. He also placed fourth with a jump of 7.92 metres in the long jump at the championships. In July, he won the gold medal with a lifetime best of 16.03m in the triple jump at the African U20 Championships in Abeokuta, Nigeria.

In 2026, he began competing for the University of Florida in the United States. He jumped 8.11 metres competing for Florida at the Tyson Invitational in Fayetteville, Arkansas on 13 February 2026. In March, he was selected for the 2026 World Athletics Indoor Championships in Toruń, Poland. In May 2026, Masikane secured a win in the men’s long jump at the SEC Outdoor Championships, recording a jump of 8.01 meters.
