= Jacious Sears =

American athlete (born 2001)

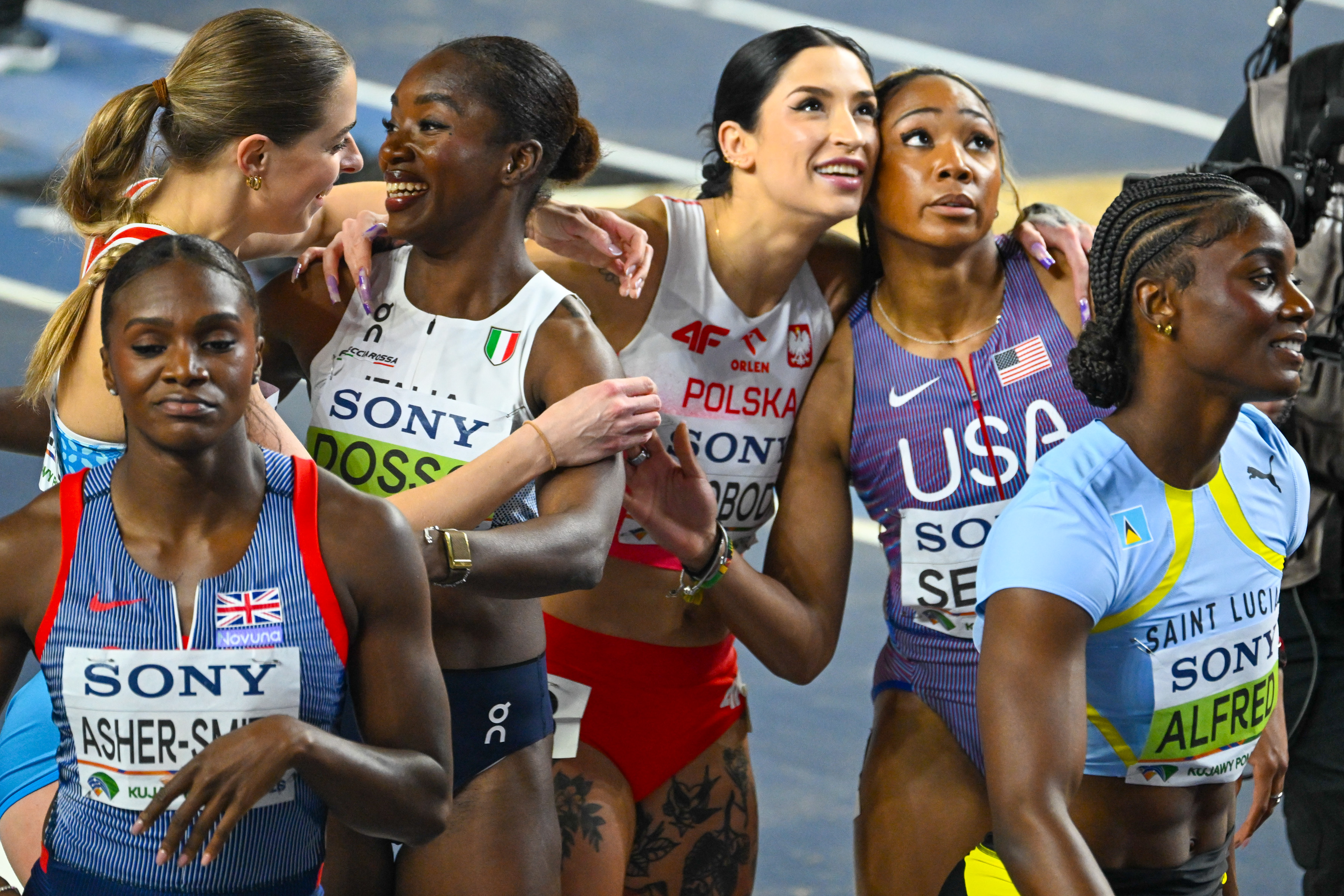
- Sears in 2026

Personal information
- Nationality: United States
- Born: 11 August 2001 (age 25)

Sport
- Sport: Athletics
- Event: Sprint

Achievements and titles
- Personal bests: 60 m: 7.02 (New York, 2025); 100 m: 10.77 (Gainesville, 2024); 200 m: 22.45 (Baton Rouge, 2023)
Medal record
Women's athletics
Representing United States
World Championships
Gold medal – first place	2025 Tokyo	4 × 100 m relay
World Indoor Championships
Silver medal – second place	2026 Toruń	60 m

Jacious Sears /dʒeɪʃʌs/ (born 11 August 2001) is an American track and field athlete who competes as a sprinter. She is the reigning American champion over 60 metres having won the title at the 2026 USA Indoor Championships and was the silver medalist in the 60 metres at the 2026 World Indoor Championships. Sears was a gold medalist in the women's 4 × 100 metres relay at the 2025 World Championships.

== Early life ==
From Palm Beach Gardens in Florida, she attended Palm Beach Gardens Community High School. She started at the University of Miami in 2020, before later transferring to the University of Tennessee, where she majored in psychology.

== Career ==
=== 2023 ===
In March 2023 Sears, competing for the University of Tennessee, ran 7.04 seconds for the 60 metres at the 2023 NCAA Division I Indoor Track and Field Championships in Albuquerque, New Mexico. She finished third in the 60 m final at the event, along with placing ninth in the 200 metres.

In May 2023, Sears set a new personal best as she won the women's 100 metres title in 10.96 seconds at the Southeastern Conference Championship (SEC) held at LSU's Bernie Moore Track and Field Stadium in Baton Rouge. Sears also finished second in a new personal best in the 200 m final, in 22.45 seconds.

Competing at the 2023 NCAA Outdoor Athletics Championships in Austin, Texas, in June 2023, she finished third in the 100 m and fourth in the 200 m. Later that month, she was named the U.S. Track & Field and Cross Country Coaches Association (USTFCCCA) South Region Track Athlete of the Year.

Competing at the 2023 USA Outdoor Track and Field Championships, in Eugene, Oregon, she reached the final of the 100 m competition, finishing eighth overall. She also reached the semi-finals stage of the 200m at the same meet.

=== 2024 ===
In February 2024, Sears, now a senior at Tennessee, won the women's 60-meter dash title and took third in the 200-meter final, both in personal-best efforts of 7.11 and 22.96 seconds at the SEC Indoor Championships at Lance Harter Track at Randal Tyson Track Center in Fayetteville, Arkansas. Also that month she ran a new indoors 200 metres personal best time of 22.57 seconds in Albuquerque. The following month, she ran 7.07 seconds to qualify for the 60 m final at the NCAA Indoor Championships in Boston, Massachusetts, she finished fourth in the final in a time of 7.13 seconds. On the same day, she reached the final of the 200 metres in a time of 22.70 seconds and finished fifth in the 200 metres in a time of 22.69 seconds.

In April 2024, she ran the second-fastest 100 m in NCAA history behind only Sha'Carri Richardson, with a 10.77 seconds run at the Tom Jones Memorial Invitational in Gainesville, Florida. She suffered an injury running the SEC final in May 2024 which ruled her out of action for the rest of the season, including the 2024 Summer Olympics in Paris.

=== 2025 ===
Returning to racing for the indoor season in 2025, Sears won the 60 m at the New Balance Indoor Grand Prix in a seasons best 7.11 seconds. The following weekend, she ran a new personal best of 7.02 seconds for the 60 metres to win the Millrose Games in New York City, on 8 February 2025. She was second over 60 metres at the 2025 USA Indoor Track and Field Championships, finishing just three-thousandths of a second behind winner Celera Barnes.

She finished third behind Melissa Jefferson and Jenna Prandini in the 100 metres of the inaugural Grand Slam Track meeting on 5 April 2025, in Kingston, Jamaica. At the second 2025 Grand Slam Track event in Miami she finished fifth in the 100 metres with a time of 10.98 seconds on 2 May 2025. She finished third in 11.11 seconds in the 100 metres at the 2025 Meeting International Mohammed VI d'Athlétisme de Rabat, part of the 2025 Diamond League, in May 2025. She ran 11.04 seconds in finishing second on 7 June 2025, at the Racers Grand Prix, a World Athletics Continental Tour Silver meeting, in Kingston, Jamaica. She ran 10.85 seconds for the 100 metres at the 2025 Prefontaine Classic. Competing at the 2025 Herculis event in Monaco, and running into a -1.4 m/s headwind, Sears finished second in 11.02 seconds behind Olympic champion Julien Alfred. She finished sixth in the final of the 100 metres at the 2025 USA Outdoor Track and Field Championships in a time of 11.00 seconds. She placed fifth in 10.96 seconds in the 100 metres at the Diamond League Final in Zurich on 28 August.

In September 2025, she competed in the women's 4 × 100 metres at the 2025 World Championships in Tokyo, Japan, running the preliminary round to help qualify the American team for the final where they won the gold medal. On 10 October, she ran 11.01 seconds to finish runner-up to Brittany Brown at the 2025 Athlos meet in New York.

=== 2026 ===
Sears opened her 2026 season with a second place finish behind Dina Asher-Smith in 7.12 seconds over 60 metres at the Millrose Games in New York. On 13 February, she ran 7.03 seconds for the 60 metres at the Tyson Invitational in Fayetteville, Arkansas, finishing runner-up to Julien Alfred. On 1 March 2026, she won the 60 metres at the 2026 USA Indoor Track and Field Championships, running 7.04 seconds for the win ahead of Mia Maxwell and Mariah Maxwell. Sears came into the championships as pre-race favourite and had also been the quickest qualifier for the final.

Competing at the 2026 World Athletics Indoor Championships in Toruń, Poland on 21 March 2026, Sears won the silver medal in the 60 metres, running 7.03 seconds to edge ahead of 2024 Olympic champion Julian Alfred by three thousandths of a second, and finishing behind Zaynab Dosso.

== Athletics achievements ==
Information from her World Athletics profile unless otherwise noted.

=== Personal bests ===
Type	Distance	Time (s)	Wind (m/s)	Venue	Date	Notes
Individual events
Indoor	60 metres	7.02	—N/a	New York, United States	8 February 2025	
Indoor	200 metres sh	22.57	—N/a	Albuquerque, United States	2 February 2024	
Outdoor	100 metres	10.77	+1.6	Gainesville, United States	13 April 2024	
Outdoor	200 metres	22.45	+0.0	Baton Rouge, United States	13 May 2023	
Outdoor	400 metres	59.00	—N/a	Clermont, United States	28 May 2016	
Team events
Indoor	4 × 400 metres relay sh	3:37.86	—N/a	Columbia, United States	22 January 2022	
Outdoor	4 × 100 metres relay	41.60	—N/a	Tokyo, Japan	20 September 2025	
Outdoor	4 × 400 metres relay	3:24.44	—N/a	Gainesville, United States	11 May 2024	

=== Circuit performances ===
Grand Slam Track results
Slam	Race group	Event	Pl.	Time	Prize money
2025 Kingston Slam	Short sprints	100 m	3rd	11.25	US$30,000
2025 Kingston Slam	Short sprints	200 m	3rd	23.79	US$30,000
2025 Miami Slam	Short sprints	100 m	5th	10.98	US$15,000
2025 Miami Slam	Short sprints	200 m	7th	22.89	US$15,000
