= Anatasha Cheptoo =

Kenyan steeplechaser

Personal information
- Full name: Anatasha Cheptoo Langat
- Born: 17 December 2007 (age 18)

Sport
- Sport: Athletics
- Event: Steeplechase
Medal record
Women's athletics
Representing Kenya
World U20 Championships
Bronze medal – third place	2026 Eugene	3000 m st.
African U20 Championships
Gold medal – first place	2025 Abeokuta	3000m S’chase

Anatasha Cheptoo Langat (born 17 December 2007) is a Kenyan steeplechaser.

== Biography ==
Cheptoo won the gold medal in the 3000 metres steeplechase at the 2025 African U20 Championships in Abeokuta, Nigeria, running 9:27.84 to finish 20 seconds below the previous championship record and lead a Kenyan sweep of the podium.

In May 2026, she won the 3000 metres steeplechase at the Kenyan U20 Trials in Nairobi ahead of Mercy Chepngeno Kosgei. In August 2026, she competed for Kenya at the 2026 World Athletics U20 Championships in the 3000 metres steeplechase, winning the bronze medal. This came despite the fact she had missed a water jump in the qualification race and had to double back to jump it at the second attempt but being forced to the back of the field before working her way back to place second in the heat.
