= Theianna-Lee Terrelonge =

Jamaican athlete (born 2007)

Personal information
- Nationality: Jamaican
- Born: October 17, 2007 (age 19)

Sport
- Sport: Athletics
- Event: Sprint
- Club: Uptimum Track Club
- Coached by: Shanikie Osbourne

Achievements and titles
- Personal bests: 60m: 7.16 (Kingston, 2026); 100m: 11.13 (Kingston, 2024); 200m: 23.53 (San Jose, 2023)
Medal record
Women's athletics
Representing Jamaica
World U20 Championships
Gold medal – first place	2026 Eugene	4×100 m relay
CARIFTA Games (U20)
Gold medal – first place	2024 St. George's	4 × 100 m relay
Silver medal – second place	2024 St George's	100 m
NACAC U18 Championships
Gold medal – first place	2023 San Jose	100 m
Gold medal – first place	2023 San Jose	200 m

Theianna-Lee Terrelonge (born 17 October 2007) is a Jamaican sprinter.

== Early life and education ==
Terrelonge attended Edwin Allen High School and signed a four-year professional deal with German sportswear company Adidas as a 17-year-old, Terrelonge, joining the Uptimum Performance Track Club, and coached by Shanikie Osbourne.

== Career ==
=== 2023 ===
Terrelonge won both the 100 metres and 200 metres titles at the 2023 NACAC U18 Championships in San Jose, Costa Rica, winning the 200 metres in a personal best 23.53 seconds.

=== 2024 ===
Having finished 2023 with a personal best for the 100 metres of 11.41 seconds, Terrelonge lowered it to 11.30 seconds at Purewater/JC/R Danny William Invitational in Kingston, Jamaica winning ahead of Sabrina Dockery in January 2024, before lowering it to 11.25 seconds in winning the under-20 100 metres event at the 2024 Jamaican Carifta Trials. She placed second to Dockery in the U20 100 metres final at the 2024 CARIFTA Games in St. George's, Grenada. She ran a new personal best of 11.13 seconds at the 2024 JAAA National Junior Championships. At the 2024 ISSA/GraceKennedy Boys and Girls’ Athletics Championships, she won her age-group 100 metres race in 11.22 seconds, also finishing second in the 200 metres in 24.31 seconds behind Shanoya Douglas. She represented Jamaica at the 2024 World Athletics U20 Championships in Lima, Peru, but was hampered by injury and was only able to take part in a single race before withdrawing.

=== 2025 ===
In the early months, Terrelonge began competing professionally for Uptimum Track Club.

=== 2026 ===
Terrelonge ran a personal best 7.16 seconds for the 60 metres (+1.4) at the 2026 Gibson McCook Relays in Kingston. In May, she won the 100 m with 11.17 seconds at the Coqui International Cup in Puerto Rico. In June, she ran 11.18 seconds to finish runner-up to Douglas at the Jamaican U20 Championships. In July 2026, she was selected to represent Jamaica at the 2026 World Athletics U20 Championships. On 5 August, she reached the final of the 100 metres race. On the final day of the World U20 Championships, she was a member of the Jamaican quartet that won a gold medal in the 4 × 100 metres relay.
