= Brenda Chekwemoi =

Ugandan athlete

Personal information
- Nationality: Ugandan
- Born: 19 November 2007 (age 18)

Sport
- Sport: Athletics
- Event(s): Cross country, Middle-distance running
Medal record
Women's athletics
Representing Uganda
African U20 Championships
Bronze medal – third place	2025 Abeokuta	1500m

Brenda Chekwemoi (born 11 November 2007) is a Ugandan middle-distance runner.

== Career ==
In June 2024, she was runner-up over 800 metres at the Ugandan National Championships. That year, she was a double medalist at the World School Sport Games in Bahrain, winning silver in the individual 800 metres and in the girls' long medley relay that had alongside Felister Chekwemoi, Mary Awat and Peace Mbabazi.

Chekwemoi won the bronze medal over 1500 metres at the 2025 African U20 Championships in Abeokuta, Nigeria, in July 2025 behind compatriot Nancy Chepkwurui. The following week, she finished runner-up to Halimah Nakaayi at the senior Ugandan Athletics Championships over 1500 metres, in 4:11.69 in Kampala.

She won the women's 2 km race at the Ugandan national cross country championships in Mbale in November 2025. In January 2026, she ran alongside Sylvia Chelangat, Silas Chemutai, and Daniel Comboni representing Uganda in the mixed relay at the 2026 World Athletics Cross Country Championships in Tallahassee, Florida, placing eighth overall.
