= Xenia Buri =

Swiss sprinter (born 2009)

Personal information
- Born: 20 November 2009 (age 16)

Sport
- Sport: Athletics
- Event: Sprinting
Medal record
Women's athletics
Representing Switzerland
World U20 Championships
Silver medal – second place	2026 Eugene	4×100 m relay
European Youth Olympic Festival
Silver medal – second place	2025 Skopje	100 m
Silver medal – second place	2025 Skopje	Medley relay

Xenia Buri (born 9 January 2008) is a Swiss sprinter.

== Biography ==
From Bern, and a member of LC Kirchberg, Buri is a member of the Swiss World Class Potentials (WCP) programme.

A month after turning 17 years-old, Buri finished fifth in a Swiss U18 and U20 record of 7.21 seconds in the 60 metres final at the senior Swiss Indoor Athletics Championships in St. Gallen in February 2025, breaking the record three times in as many races. The following week at the Swiss Indoor Youth Championships in Magglingen, Buri set a new national U18 record in the 60m hurdles with 8.16 seconds. She also won the 60m in 7.23 seconds. Buri broke the Swiss U20 record for the 100 metres in consecutive weeks in June 2025, with her time of 11.24 seconds in Meilen equalling the European U18 best set by Great Britain's Jodie Williams in 2009. The record was then broken by Italy's Kelly Doualla the following month at the 2025 European Youth Olympic Festival, where Buri won the silver medal in the 100 metres behind Doualla, running 11.30 seconds.

In May 2026, she was part of a Swiss relay team which set a new national under-20 record in the 4 x 100 metres relay of 43.74 seconds. The following month, she set a new Swiss U20 record in the 200 metres with a time of 23.34 seconds at the Bernese Youth Championships in Thun. In June, she lowered her personal best for the 100 metres to 11.13 seconds. Competing in the 4 x 100 m relay at the international meeting in Freiburg alongside Mara Schwitter, Milla Tonazzi and Joy Umegbolu she was part of the team which improved the Swiss records in the U23 and U20 categories, with a time of 43.32 seconds. On 16 July, she ran 11.38 seconds for the 100 metres at Spitzen Leichtathletik Luzern. On 5 August, Buri set a new national U20 record of 11.23 seconds to reach the final of the 100 metres race at the 2026 World Athletics U20 Championships in Eugene, United States, prior to placing fourth in the final into a headwind with 11.33 seconds.
