= Karabo Letebele =

South African athlete (born 2006)

Personal information
- Born: 9 December 2006 (age 19)

Sport
- Sport: Athletics
- Event: Sprint

Achievements and titles
- Personal bests: 60 m: 6.53 (Potchefstroom 2025) AU20R; 100 m: 10.17 (Potchefstroom 2025); 200 m: 201.73 (Pretoria 2025)
Medal record
Representing South Africa
Men's athletics
African U20 Championships
Silver medal – second place	2025 Abeokuta	100m

Karabo Letebele (born 9 December 2006) is a South African sprinter. In 2025, he became the African under-20 record holder over 60 metres.

== Early life ==
From Vanderbijlpark, Letebele was educated at Grey College High School in Bloemfontein. He was a keen footballer as well as track and field athlete before focusing on athletics.

== Career ==
In 2024, Letebele finished seventh in the 100 metres final at the 2024 ASA U20 Championships, and had a personal best of 10.45 seconds that year.

Letebele recorded a win over 100 metres against African record holder Ferdinand Omanyala at Athletics South Africa’s Grand Prix on 12 March 2025, running 10.19 seconds for the win. Later that month he won in a time of 10.18 seconds the 100 metres at the South African Youth, Junior & Senior Provincial Championships. Letebele was runner-up to Bayanda Walaza in the 100 metres at the South African U20 Championships in Cape Town at the end of March 2025. He ran 10.17 seconds for a fifth place finish at the 2025 senior South African Athletics Championships over 100 metres the following month. That summer, he was a silver medalist over 100 metres at the 2025 African U20 Championships in Athletics in Abeokuta, Nigeria.

In October 2025, still aged 18 years-old, he ran the 60 metres in 6.53 seconds in Potchefstroom and 6.54 seconds in Johannesburg, to break the African under-20 area record, and become the first South African to meet the automatic time for the 2026 World Athletics Indoor Championships. The following month, he ran a new personal best of 10.11 seconds for the 100 metres in Sasolburg. Competing in the United States in December 2025, he won the 60m at the New Balance Early Bird Invite, in a time of 6.59 seconds. After joining the University of Arkansas, he moved to third on their 60 metres all-time list in February 2026, running 6.55 seconds in Fayetteville, to move behind only Jordan Anthony and Jelani Watkins. In February, he then ran 6.53 seconds at the Southeastern Conference Indoor Track & Field Championship.

In March 2026, he was selected for the 2026 World Athletics Indoor Championships in Poland, but was unable to compete after not being granted the requisite VISA. In March 2026, he was provisionally selected for the 2026 Commonwealth Games in Glasgow. In June, he qualified for the 2026 NCAA Outdoor Championships.
