= Amanda Eccleston =

American middle-distance runner

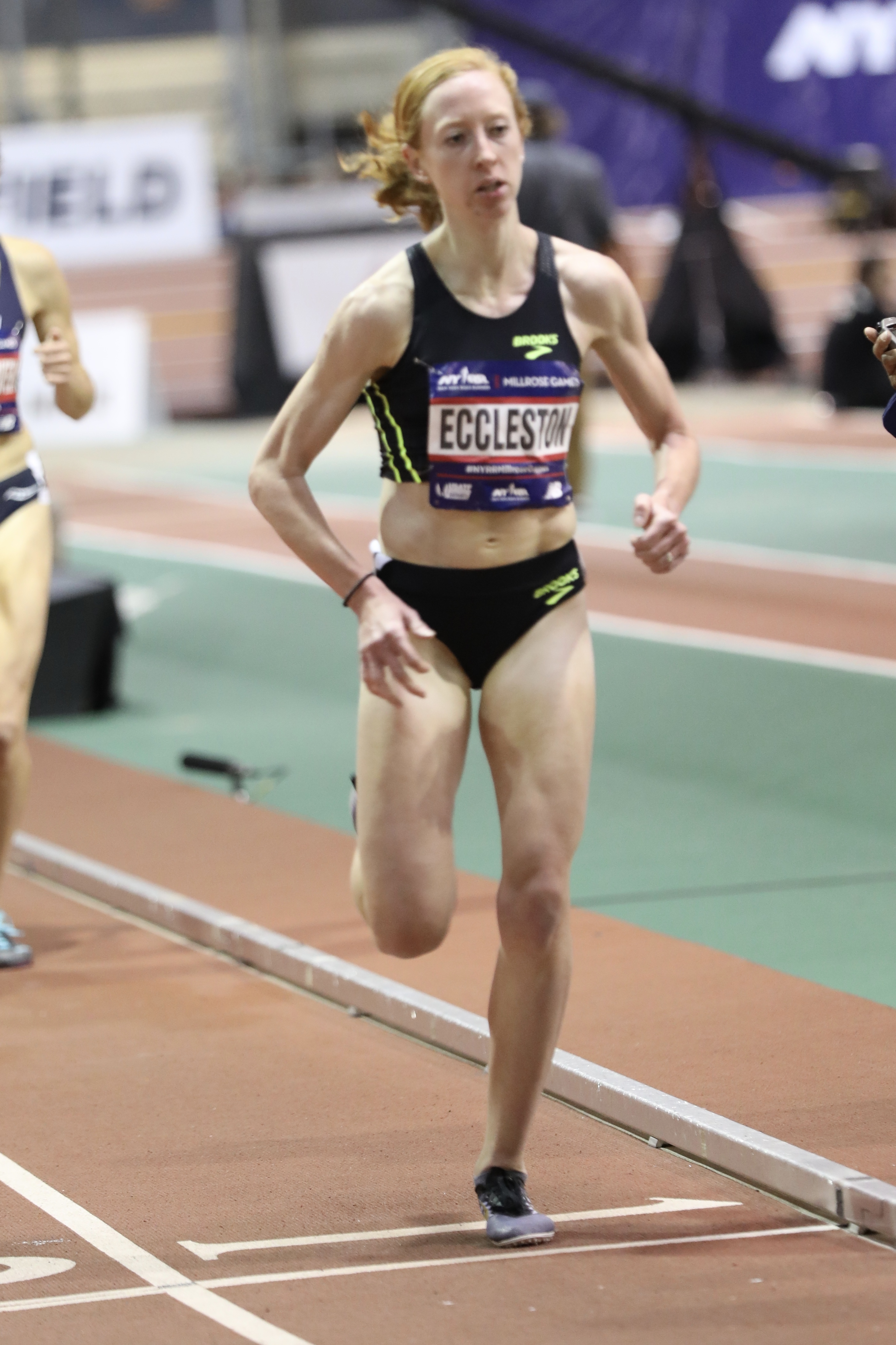
- Eccleston at the 2019 Millrose Games

Personal information
- Nationality: American
- Born: Amanda Putt; June 18, 1990 (age 36)
- Home town: Adrian, Michigan
- Website: https://amandaecclestonruns.com/

Sport
- Sport: Athletics
- Events: 1500 metres, mile run
- College team: Hillsdale Chargers (2009–2012); Michigan Wolverines (2012–2013)
- Club: Brooks Beasts

Achievements and titles
- National finals: 2013 NCAA indoors; • 1500 m, 5th; • DMR, 1st (gold); 2014 USAs; • 1500 m, 10th; 2014 USAs; • 1500 m, 10th; 2016 USA Indoors; • 1500 m, 3rd (bronze); 2016 USAs; • 1500 m, 4th; 2017 USAs; • 1500 m, 9th; 2019 USA Indoors; • Mile run, 9th; • Two miles, 9th
- Personal bests: 1500m: 4:03.25 (2016); Mile: 4:25.64 (2016)

Amanda Eccleston (née Putt; born 18 June 1990) is an American former middle-distance runner and 2013 NCAA Division I champion in the distance medley relay.

== Biography ==
Eccleston (then Putt) graduated from Tecumseh High School with a modest 1600 metres personal best of 5:13. As a runner for NCAA Division II school Hillsdale College, she improved to a 4:15 1500 metres personal best and was a three time NCAA Division II champion.

In 2012, Eccleston signed to the Michigan Wolverines track and field NCAA Division I team to compete as a graduate student. At the 2013 NCAA Division I Indoor Track and Field Championships, she anchored the Michigan distance medley relay team to a national title with a 4:32 1600 metres split.

Eccleston earned her first national medal at the 2016 USA Indoor Track and Field Championships, finishing 3rd in the 1500 metres though only the top two were selected to compete at the 2016 IAAF World Indoor Championships. Later that year, she again missed making the US national team by one place, finishing 4th at the 2016 United States Olympic trials.

Eccleston won the 2017 Sir Walter Miler in a time of 4:31.72.

In 2021, Eccleston was named assistant coach of the Central Michigan Chippewas track and field team.

== Statistics ==
=== Personal bests ===
Event	Mark	Competition	Venue	Date
1500 metres	4:03.25	London Diamond League	London, United Kingdom	22 July 2016
Mile run	4:25.64	West Chester Mile	Raleigh, North Carolina	5 August 2016
