= Sir Walter Miler =

Annual race at Meredith College, Raleigh, North Carolina

- Date: August
- Location: Raleigh, North Carolina
- Event type: All-comers track meet
- Distance: Mile
- Established: 2014
- Course records: Men: 3:53.34 by Yared Nuguse (2022); Women: 4:21.89 by Nikki Hiltz (2022)

The Sir Walter Miler is an outdoor one mile race held annually at Meredith College in Raleigh, North Carolina, typically the first Friday in August. The race is named after Sir Walter Raleigh. It is directed and promoted by Sir Walter Running, a Raleigh-based 501(c)(3) non-profit organization. A hallmark of the race is the close proximity of fans to the track, as spectators gather on the infield and in the outer lanes of the track to watch the races.

== History ==
A predecessor event to the Sir Walter Miler was held in June 2013 at Cardinal Gibbons High School, referred to as the Sandman Mile.

The first Sir Walter miler was held 1 August 2014 at the Meredith College Track in Raleigh, NC. The original event included a Women's Sub 4.5 Challenge and a Men's Sub 4 Challenge. Eight women raced in the women's one mile race, while none broke the four minute thirty second challenge time. Ten men race in the men's one mile race and three men ran the mile in faster than four minutes, the first time the four minute barrier had been broken in the city of Raleigh since 1974.

The second Sir Walter Miler was held 7 August 2015. Ten women finished the women's one mile race, and three finished the mile faster than four minutes thirty seconds. Fifteen men finished the men's one mile race, and five finished in faster than four minutes.

The third Sir Walter Miler was held on 5 August 2016. Mike Brannigan finished in 3:57:58 becoming the first person with a T20 paralympic classification to officially run the mile faster than four minutes.

The fifth Sir Walter Miler was held on 3 August 2018 at Meredith College. Thirteen men finished the mile faster than 4:00:00, an American record.

In 2019, Sir Walter added Olympian-turned broadcaster Carrie Tollefson to the onfield announcing team. In the men's race that year, Chris O'Hare outkicked Sam Prakel to win in 3:54.81, while Cory McGee improved on prior 4th and 3rd-place finishes to win the women's race in 4:27.87.

After a break during the covid-impacted 2020 season, Sir Walter returned at a new venue for the pro field; Cardinal Gibbons High School. There, Geordie Beamish led three men under 4:00 for the first time when he came from behind to astonish the crowd in a 3:54.92 victory. Josette Norris set a world lead in the women's race, bringing herself and 7 women under the 4:30 barrier for the first time.

The eighth Sir Walter Miler featured two state records, incentivized by $5000 bonuses for that achievement. Nikki Hiltz won the women's elite mile with a resounding kick from 300m out to break the NC state record in 4:21.89. Yared Nuguse responded likewise by winning the men's race in 3:53.34, beating the state record by a half second.

== Mile winners ==
Key: Broke Meet record Broke State record

Edition	Men's mile winner	Time (m:s)	Women's mile winner	Time (m:s)
2014	Ford Palmer (United States)	3:57.61	Heidi Gregson (Australia)	4:34.05
2015	Robby Andrews (United States)	3:57.38	Stephanie Garcia (United States)	4:28.84
2016	Kyle Merber (United States)	3:54.57	Lauren Johnson (United States)	4:25.04
2017	Drew Hunter (United States)	3:57.32	Amanda Eccleston (United States)	4:31.72
2018	Lopez Lomong (United States)	3:53.86	Charlene Lipsey (United States)	4:27.28
2019	Chris O'Hare (United Kingdom)	3:54.81	Cory McGee (United States)	4:27.87
2021	Geordie Beamish (New Zealand)	3:54.92	Josette Norris (United States)	4:25.92
2022	Yared Nuguse (United States)	3:53.34	Nikki Hiltz (United States)	4:21.89
2023	Amon Kemboi (Kenya)	3:57.84	Abby Nichols (United States)	4:26.80
2024	Waleed Suliman (United States)	3:51.89	Dorcus Ewoi (Kenya)	4:19.71
2025	Ky Robinson (Australia)	3:50.80	Gracie Morris (United States)	4:23.74

== See also ==
- Middle distance track event
