= Mia Maxwell =

American sprinter

Personal information
- Born: September 21, 2007 (age 18)

Sport
- Sport: Athletics
- Event: Sprint

Achievements and titles
- Personal bests: 60m: 7.13 (2026); 100m: 11.04 (2025); 200m: 22.37 (2026); Triple Jump: 12.95m (2026)
Medal record
Women's athletics
Representing the United States
World U20 Championships
Gold medal – first place	2026 Eugene	100m
Gold medal – first place	2026 Eugene	200m

Mia Maxwell (born 21 September 2007) is an American sprinter and triple jumper from Texas. She is the world under-20 champion in the 100 meters and 200 meters.

== Early and personal life ==
From Texas, Maxwell and her twin sister Mariah Maxwell both compete as track and field athletes. Their father was a running back in high school and their mother participated in gymnastics. They have a younger sister, Madison. They attended Atascocita High School in Texas.

== Career ==
=== 2025 ===
In May 2025, she ran 11.04 seconds (+1.1 m/s) for the 100 metres whilst competing in Austin, Texas at the UIL Texas State Championships. The following month, at the Brooks PR Invitational, she ran another wind-legal 11.04 (+1.2), matching her best 100 metres time. Her times moved her past Tiffany Townsend and Sha'Carri Richardson on the girls all-time list high school list. In June 2025, she also won the New Balance Nationals Outdoor championships 100 meters in 11.35 seconds. In July, Maxwell was announced as the 2024-2025 Gatorade Texas Girls Track & Field Player of the Year.

In December 2025, at the 2025 North Texas Showcase, Maxwell performed well in the triple jump, surpassing the record of Erica McLain, as well as the indoor best of Jasmine Moore, and was only inches away from Moore's outright high school record set outdoors.

=== 2026 ===
In January 2026, she won the 200 metres and finished runner-up to her twin sister Mariah over 60 metres at the Texas High School Indoor Championships. Her 200 metres time of in 22.89 seconds set a new meet record and made her the fastest girl in Texas history indoors, and tied for fifth on the American all-time high school list. Later that month, she won the 60 metres at the VA Showcase, ahead of her twin sister, Mariah. Competing at the Millrose Games in February 2026, Maxwell ran 7.20 seconds for the 60 metres winning the girls race ahead of Melanie Doggett. Maxwell also won the girls triple jump with a distance of 12.95 metres.

On 1 March 2026, she was second behind Jacious Sears in the 60 metres at the 2026 USA Indoor Track and Field Championships, and tied the high school national record in 7.13 seconds, with her twin sister Mariah placing third. Later that month, Maxwell won the triple jump at the Nike Indoor Nationals. Mia also ran 23.04 seconds for second in the 200 metres, finishing behind her sister Mariah, with the race coming in the middle of the triple jump competition. In June, she won the 100 metres title at the 2026 USATF U20 Championships in 11.08 seconds, with her sister placing second. On 6 August, she won the final of the 100 metres race at the 2026 World Athletics U20 Championships in Eugene, running 11.14 seconds to win ahead of Shanoya Douglas of Jamaica and Kelly Doualla of Italy. She competed a sprint double at the championships, running a personal best 22.37 seconds to win the final of the 200 metres ahead of Douglas and her sister Mariah.
