= Ford Palmer =

American middle-distance runner

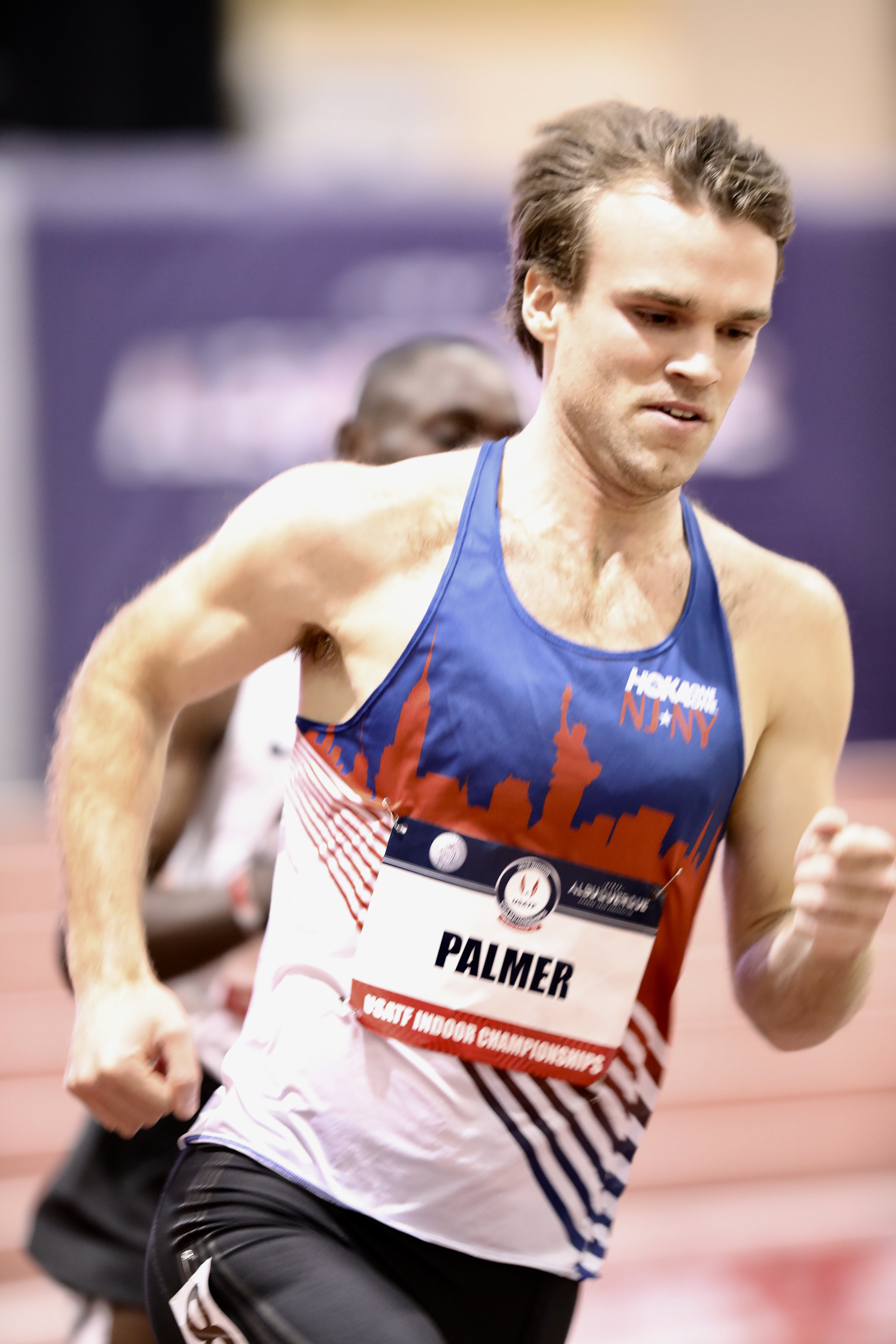
- Palmer at the 2018 USATF Indoor Championships

Personal information
- Nationality: American
- Born: October 6, 1990 (age 36) Atlantic County, New Jersey, U.S.

Sport
- Sport: Track
- Events: 1500 meters, mile
- College team: Monmouth

Achievements and titles
- Personal bests: 1500m: 3:36.98; Mile: 3:54.92i^{1}
- Updated on September 17, 2017

Ford Palmer (born October 6, 1990) is an American professional middle-distance runner who specializes in the 1500 meters and the mile. He ran in the men's 1500 meters at the 2016 US Olympic Trials.

== Running career ==
=== High school ===
Palmer attended Absegami High School in Galloway Township, New Jersey, where he played as a linebacker for the school's football team. Outside of football season, Palmer ran on Absegami's track team as an 800 meter runner. However, after suffering a total of four concussions over the course of high school, he gave up football in order to focus on running. At New Jersey's 2009 Meet of Champions, Palmer placed third overall in the boys' 800 meter race in a time of 1:52.24, his best result in high school.

=== Collegiate ===
Palmer attended and ran track at Monmouth University, where he was coached by Chris Tarello. After graduating from high school, Palmer's weight at one point was as high as 205 pounds. In his first two seasons at Monmouth, his training volume was considerably low at 25 miles of running per week. As a junior, a physical check-up revealed that Palmer had high blood pressure. After the diagnosis, he watched Forks Over Knives, after which he began a pescetarian diet, which he maintained for a year. Subsequently, he tried a vegetarian diet, after which he fully transitioned into a vegan in 2011. By the end of Palmer's senior year at Monmouth, he not only changed his diet but also lost 51 pounds and recorded a mile time of 4:00.4.

=== Post-collegiate ===
After graduating from Monmouth in 2013, Palmer began working as a bartender while training under coach Frank Gagliano with New Jersey New York Track Club. In early 2014, he was close to quitting the sport as he worked some overnight bar shifts in order to support himself. He made a career breakthrough on August 1, 2014, when he won the Sir Walter Miler in 3:57.61, his first ever mile under four minutes. In January 2015, Palmer signed a professional contract with Hoka One One. The following year, he raced in the men's 1500 meters at the 2016 US Olympic Trials, but did not progress beyond the first heat after tripping on a wet rack.

Palmer has divided his time living with his mother in Galloway Township and his father in Upper Township, New Jersey.

== Notes ==
- ^1 The "i" after a result indicates an indoor performance.
