= Graydon Morris =

American long-distance runner

Personal information
- Born: 17 December 2001 (age 24)
- Home town: Aledo, Texas

Sport
- Country: United States
- Sport: Athletics
- Events: Long-distance running, Cross country running
- Club: Puma

Graydon Morris (born 17 December 2001) is an American long-distance and cross country runner. In 2026, he became the USA national champion in the 10-mile run.

== Biography ==
From Aledo, Texas, and a student at Aledo High School, Morris excelled in cross country running for a young age, and in 2016 became just the fourth ninth grade boy to qualify for the national Foot Locker Cross Country Championships. Morris won the first of three consecutive Texas state titles in cross country in 2017. He placed second at the 2017 Foot Locker Championship. Shortly after his sixteenth birthday in January 2018, he represented the United States at the Great Edinburgh XCountry International Challenge in Scotland.

In the spring of 2018, he also won Texas state titles in the 1600 metres and 3200 metres. In 2019, he also won state high school title in the 800 metres. That year, he became just the second man, after Jorge Torres to qualify for the Foot Locker Championships in four consecutive years.

Although he lost his senior high school track season with events cancelled due to the COVID-19 pandemic, he began to run at the University of Texas in Austin. However, after injury and not running for over a year he transferred to Texas Christian University in 2022. In his 2022-2023 debut year for TCU his performances on odds winning the 5000m race at the Vanderbilt Invitational before another injury caused him to miss the end of the season.

Later turning professional with Puma Elite, and based in Chapel Hill, North Carolina, he ran 1:01:09 for a top-ten finish at the 2026 Houston Half Marathon. On 12 April 2026, Morris won the USATF 10-mile run national title at the Cherry Blossom Ten Mile Run in Washington DC, running 46:18 for his first national championship.

== Personal life ==
From Texas, his twin sister Gracie Morris is also a professional athlete.
