= Andrej Benda =

Slovak bobsledder (born 1975)

Personal information
- Nationality: Slovak
- Born: 25 September 1975 (age 50) Bratislava, Czechoslovakia

Sport
- Sport: Bobsleigh

Andrej Benda (born 25 September 1975) is a Slovak former athlete and bobsledder. He competed in the four man event at the 2006 Winter Olympics. Benda was also a national champion in the long jump.

== Personal life ==
Married to athlete and coach Naďa Bendova, his children Jakub and Ema also compete in athletics.
