= Gracie Morris =

American middle-distance runner

Personal information
- Born: 17 December 2001 (age 24)
- Home town: Aledo, Texas

Sport
- Country: United States
- Sport: Track and field
- Events: Middle-distance running, Cross country running
- University team: TCU Horned Frogs; Texas Longhorns
- Club: Nike Swoosh TC
- Turned pro: 2024

Gracie Morris (born 17 December 2001) is an American middle-distance and cross country runner. She won the 2 km race at the 2025 USA Cross Country Championships and was runner-up over 1500 metres at the 2026 USA Indoor Championships.

== Biography ==
Morris attended Aledo High School in Texas, University of Texas at Austin, and Texas Christian University, before turning professional with Puma Elite in North Carolina.

In April 2025, Morris placed third on the road at the 2025 USATF 1 Mile Championships in Des Moines, Iowa, running 4:24.73 finishing behind Krissy Gear who set a new Mariana record. Morris finished ninth in the 1500 metres at 2025 USA Outdoor Track and Field Championships, before winning the Sir Walter Miler in Raleigh, North Carolina, in a personal best time of 4:23.74. Throughout the 2025 track season, Morris improved her personal best for the 1500 metres and the mile run by four seconds. In September 2025, Morris won the Fifth Avenue Mile race in New York City, defeating defending champion Karissa Schweizer to win with a time of 4:16.

Morris won the 2 km race ahead of Sage Hurta-Klecker at the 2025 USA Cross Country Championships to gain automatic selection for the mixed relay race at the upcoming World Cross Country Championships. It was her first cross country race since she competed but did not finish at the 2023 NCAA Cross Country Championships for TCU.

Competing at the 2026 World Athletics Cross Country Championships in Tallahassee alongside Ethan Strand, Wes Porter and Hurta-Klecker on 10 January, she helped the American team place fifth overall. On 24 January, Morris ran 4:02.12 for an indoors personal best over 1500 metres at the New Balance Indoor Grand Prix in Boston.

On 1 March 2026, she was second behind Nikki Hiltz but ahead of Lindsey Butler in the 1500 metres at the 2026 USA Indoor Track and Field Championships in 4:11.39. She was selected to represent the United States at the 2026 World Athletics Indoor Championships in Toruń, Poland, and in the heats of the 1500 metres ran 4:12.57 to advanced to her first global final, placing seventh overall in 4:03.75. Competing at the 2026 Shanghai Diamond League, Morris set a personal best in the 1500 metres, running 4:00.29.

== Personal life ==
Her twin brother Graydon Morris also competes as a runner and was also a Texas high school champion.

=== International competitions ===
Representing the United States
Year	Competition	Venue	Position	Event	Time
2026	World Athletics Cross Country Championships	Tallahassee, Florida	5th	Senior 4x2km Mixed Relay	22:43
2026	World Athletics Indoor Championships	Toruń, Poland	7th	1500m	4:03.75

=== National championships ===
Year	Competition	Venue	Position	Event	Time
2024	Olympic Trials	Eugene, Oregon	36th	1500m	4:18.32
2025	USATF Indoor Championships	Staten Island, New York	6th	1500m	4:09.26
2025	USATF Outdoor Championships	Eugene, Oregon	9th	1500m	4:08.56
2025	USATF Cross Country Championships	Portland, Oregon	1st	2 km	6:19.4
2026	USATF Indoor Championships	Staten Island, New York	2nd	1500m	4:11.39
2026	USATF 1 Mile Road Championships	Des Moines, Iowa	3rd	Mile	4:25.8
