= Mercy Chepngeno Kosgei =

Kenyan long-distance runner

Mercy Chepngeno
Personal information
- Full name: Mercy Chepngeno Kosgei
- Born: 16 September 2007 (age 19)

Sport
- Sport: Athletics
- Event: Steeplechase
Medal record
Women's athletics
Representing Kenya
African Championships
Silver medal – second place	2026 Accra	3000 metres steeplechase
African U20 Championships
Silver medal – second place	2025 Abeokuta	3000m st.

Mercy Chepngeno Kosgei (born 16 September 2007) is a Kenyan steeplechaser. She won the silver medals in the 3000 metres steeplechase at the 2026 African Championships and the 2025 African U20 Championships.

== Biography ==
Born in the village of Lesirwo, Kericho County, Chepnego studied at Lesirwo Secondary School in Kericho and later studied at Chagaik Secondary School. In March 2024, as a 17-year-old, Chepnego won the 3000 metres steeplechase at the Rift Valley Regional Games in Nandi, whilst competing barefoot.

Chepngeno was a silver medalist in the 3000 metres steeplechase at the 2025 African U20 Championships in Abeokuta, Nigeria, behind compatriot Anatasha Cheptoo.

In May 2026, she won the silver medal behind compatriot Diana Chepkemoi in the 3000 metres steeplechase at the 2026 African Championships in Athletics in Accra, Ghana. Later that month, she placed second in the 3000 m steeplechase at the Kenyan U20 Trials in Nairobi, running 9:47.40 to finish behind Anatasha Cheptoo. She competed for Kenya at the 2026 World Athletics U20 Championships in the United States, qualifying for the final by winning her preliminary heat.
