= Almaz Yohannis =

Ethiopian steeplechaser (born 2007)

Personal information
- Nationality: Ethiopian
- Born: 11 December 2007 (age 18)

Sport
- Sport: Athletics
- Event: Steeplechase
Medal record
Women's athletics
Representing Ethiopia
World U20 Championships
Gold medal – first place	2026 Eugene	3000 m st.
African Championships
Bronze medal – third place	2026 Accra	3000 m st.

Almaz Yohannis (born 11 December 2007) is an Ethiopian steeplechaser. She won a gold medal in steeplechase at the 2026 World Athletics U20 Championships.

== Career ==
In May 2026, Almaz Yohannis competed at the 2026 African Championships in Athletics and won a bronze medal in the 3000 metres steeplechase. In August 2026, she competed at the 2026 World Athletics U20 Championships in the 3000 metres steeplechase. During the second heat she ranked first with a time of 9:42.45 and advanced to the finals. During the finals she won a gold medal with a time of 9:15.81.
