= Chloe Timberg =

American athlete (born 2003)

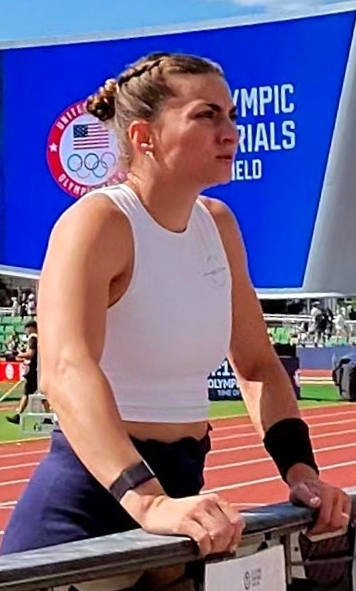
- Timberg in 2024

Personal information
- Nationality: American
- Born: June 24, 2003 (age 23)

Sport
- Sport: Athletics
- Event: Pole vault

Chloe Timberg (born 24 June 2003) is an American pole vaulter. She is the reigning American indoor champion, having won the title at the 2026 USA Indoor Championships. She previously won the 2024 NCAA championship title.

== Early life ==
Timberg grew up in Doylestown, Pennsylvania and initially competed in gymnastics before transitioning to pole vault. She attended Central Bucks West High School before going to college at Rutgers University.

== Career ==
Competing for the Rutgers Scarlet Knights, she finished third behind Hana Moll at the 2024 NCAA Division I Indoor Track and Field Championships in Boston, Massachusetts. She cleared 15 feet for the first time in April 2024.

She set an NCAA record with a 4.71 metres clearance to win the 2024 NCAA Division I Outdoor Track and Field Championships in Eugene, Oregon. She finished seventh overall in the US Olympic Trials later that month, with a clearance of 4.63 metres.

She cleared 4.72 metres indoors in February 2025. That month, she finished fourth at the Millrose Games. She was runner-up to Hana Moll at the 2025 NCAA Outdoor Championships final in Eugene, Oregon in June 2025.

On 1 February 2026, competing at the Millrose Games in New York, Timberg won the pole vault with a 4.60m clearance. On 1 March 2026, she won the 2026 USA Indoor Track and Field Championships, clearing 4.70 metres on the day. She was selected to represent the United States at the 2026 World Athletics Indoor Championships in Toruń, Poland.

== Personal life ==
Timberg overcame an eating disorder as a young athlete.
