= Mariah Maxwell =

American sprinter

Personal information
- Born: 21 September 2007 (age 18)

Sport
- Sport: Athletics
- Event: Sprint

Achievements and titles
- Personal bests: 60m: 7.14 (2025); 100m: 11.11 (2026); 200m: 22.44 (2026); Long Jump: 5.85m (2025)
Medal record
Women's athletics
Representing United States
World U20 Championships
Bronze medal – third place	2026 Eugene	200m

Mariah Maxwell (born 21 September 2007) is an American sprinter and long jumper from Texas. She placed third over 60 metres at the 2026 USA Indoor Championships. Her twin sister Mia Maxwell also competes as a sprinter.

== Early and personal life ==
From Texas, Maxwell and her twin sister Mia both compete as track and field athletes. They attended Atascocita High School in Texas.

== Career ==
She won the 200 metres final at the USATF National Junior Olympics with a personal-best time of 23.84 seconds (-1.3 m/s) in July 2024. The following year, Maxwell won the 2025 UIL Girls 6A 200 metres in Texas in May 2025, in a time of 22.93 seconds. In June 2025, she was runner-up to her sister Mia at the New Balance Nationals Outdoor championships 100 meters in 11.52 seconds.

In January 2026, she won the 60 metres at the Texas High School Indoor Championships in a meet and facility record time of 7.27 seconds. At the same meeting she ran the second fastest Texas high school indoor 200 metres time of 22.97 seconds, behind only her sister. On 17 January 2026, Maxwell ran the fastest indoors 300m time in American high-school history with 36.24 seconds at the VA Showcase, despite it being the first time she had ever competed at the distance. Later the same day she also finished second in the girls 60 metres in 7.28 seconds, behind her twin sister, Mia. On 1 February, Maxwell placed third behind Dina Asher-Smith and Jacious Sears with 7.26 seconds for the 60 metres indoors competing against professionals at the Millrose Games, in New York. She also broke both the facility and meet record in the girls 300 metres at the Games, running 36.61 seconds.

On 1 March 2026, she was third in the 60 metres at the 2026 USA Indoor Track and Field Championships, finishing behind Jacious Sears and her twin sister Mia who tied the high school national record in 7.13 seconds, with Mariah 0.01 second behind her. Later that month, Maxwell won the 200 metres race at the Nike Indoor Nationals, running 22.84 seconds to finish ahead of her sister Mia.

Maxwell opened her 2026 outdoor season at the Clyde Hart Classic in Texas, running a personal best 11.11 seconds (+1.5) for the 100 m finishing second behind Cambrea Sturgis. Competing over 200 meters at the Texas Relays she ran a wind-assisted 22.25 seconds (+3.8) third all-time on the all-conditions high school list behind Allyson Felix and Dana Wilson at the Texas Relays on 5 April 2026. Later that month at the Tom Jones Invitational in Gainesville, Florida she ran a wind-legal personal best of 22.44 seconds. In June, she placed second in the 100 metres at the 2026 USATF U20 Championships behind her sister. In August, she won the bronze medal in the 200 metres at the 2026 World Athletics U20 Championships in Eugene. She also had a fifth place finish in the 100 m final, with both races won by her sister Mia.
