= 2025 African U18 and U20 Championships in Athletics =

African U18 and U20 Championships
- Dates: 16–20 July
- Host city: Abeokuta, Nigeria
- Venue: MKO Abiola Sports Complex
- Level: U20 and U18
- Events: 45 U20 & 40 U18

The 2025 African U20 Championships in Athletics was the sixteenth edition of the biennial, continental athletics tournament for African athletes aged 19 years or younger, for the third time held jointly with the African U18 Championships in Athletics. It was held at the MKO Abiola Sports Complex in Abeokuta, Nigeria, between 16 and 20 July.

== Medal summary ==
=== Men (U20) ===
Event	Gold		Silver		Bronze	
100 metres (Wind: -1.7 m/s)	Clinton Owatinya (KEN)	10.42	Karabo Letebele (RSA)	10.54	Caleb John (NGR)	10.61
200 metres (Wind: m/s)	Justice Oratile (BOT)	21.02	Sbongakonke Makhaza (RSA)	21.10	Brian Okoth (KEN)	21.32
400 metres	Justice Oratile (BOT)	45.58	Ezekiel Asuquo (NGR)	45.83	Victor Sampson (NGR)	45.87
800 metres	Imad Bouchajda (MAR)	1:49.17	Hamid Boutfidi (MAR)	1:49.91	Alebe Sisay (ETH)	1:50.44
1500 metres	Jaouad Khchina (MAR)	3:38.17	Logorodi Owan (KEN)	3:39.07	Jacob Sande (UGA)	3:39.24
5000 metres	Dennis Kipkoech Kemboi (KEN)	13:22.80	Ossama Erradouane (MAR)	13:24.33	Simba Samuel Cherop (UGA)	13:24.45
10,000 metres	Samuel Simba Cherop (UGA)	28:20.07	Ronald Ngetich (KEN)	28:21.61	Edwin Elkana (KEN)	28:21.62
110 metres hurdles (99 cm) (Wind: m/s)	Naeem Jack (RSA)	13.73	Gasmi Zehr Eddine (ALG)	13.76	Louai Lamraoui (ALG)	13.82
400 metres hurdles	Njabulo Mbatha (RSA)	51.48	Ali Berthe (BUR)	52.03	Oseiwe Salami (NGR)	52.04
3000 metres steeplechase	Brian Kandie (KEN)	8:33.52	Nicholas Losiwareng Ktum (KEN)	8:42.08	Bilal Mahfoud (MAR)	8:43.68
4 × 100 metres relay	Nigeria (NGR)	40.25	Ghana (GHA)	40.77	Zimbabwe (ZIM)	40.94
4 × 400 metres relay	Botswana (BOT)	3:07.54 CR	South Africa (RSA)			
10,000 m walk	Rayen Cherni (TUN)	41:26.93	Ziad Anis Hassan (EGY)	44:45.59	Rayane Adouane (ALG)	47:50.54
High jump	Honour Clement (NGR)	2.10	Leehandro Arendse (RSA)	1.80	David Zella (BUR)	1.60
Pole vault	Abderraouf Merah (ALG)	4.30	Mohcene Guerfi (ALG); Elvis Hwata (ZIM)	4.20	Not awarded	
Long jump	Louaï Lamraoui (ALG)		Temoso Masikane (RSA)		Yassine Mririch (MAR)	
Triple jump	Temoso Masikane (RSA)		[[]] (25x17px)		[[]] (25x17px)	
Shot put (6 kg)	Hencu Lamberts (RSA)	20.57	Wesley Badenhorst (RSA)	17.88	Ammar Ali Nadi (EGY)	17.54
Discus throw (1.75 kg)	[[]] (25x17px)		[[]] (25x17px)		[[]] (25x17px)	
Hammer throw (6 kg)	Abdullah Hassan (EGY)	67.85	Eben Jacobs (RSA)	67.75	Adam Tamer Owis (EGY)	64.06
Javelin throw	Ewald Jansen (RSA)	77.62	Mohamed Bayoumy (EGY)	71.67	Haithem Arafat (ALG)	59.25
Decathlon (U20)	Walid Touati (ALG)	6778	Mohcene Guerfi (ALG)	6722	Walid Fares Ghettas (ALG)	6502

=== Women (U20) ===
Event	Gold		Silver		Bronze	
100 metres (Wind: -1.9 m/s)	Chioma Cynthia Nweke (NGR)	11.65	Success Oghene Oyibu (NGR)	11.78	Lou Yonan Chantal Djehi (CIV)	11.87
200 metres (Wind: m/s)	Success Oghene Oyibu (NGR)	23.56	Chioma Cynthia Nweke (NGR)	23.95	Lucy Chiamaka Nwankwo (NGR)	24.24
400 metres	Favour Onyah (NGR)	52.47	Anita Enaruna (NGR)	52.97	Toheebat Jimoh (NGR)	53.00
800 metres	Nancy Jepgetich (KEN)	2:04.14	Nesrine Abed (ALG)	2:04.28	Saida El Bouzi (MAR)	2:04.65
1500 metres	Nancy Chepkwurui (UGA)	4:10.31	Sheila Chepngetich (KEN)	4:10.79	Brenda Chekwemoi (UGA)	4:13.07
3000 metres	Bentalin Yeko (UGA)	8:45.49	Tirhas Gebrehiwet (ETH)	8:48.98	Joyline Chepkemoi (KEN)	8:49.48
5000 metres	Charity Cherop (UGA)	15:10.88	Risper Cherop (UGA)	15:29.60	Sharon Chepkemoi (KEN)	15:31.40
100 metres hurdles (Wind: -0.6 m/s)	Tumi Ramokgoba (RSA)	13.52	Precious Okeoghene (NGR)	14.29	Malak Belhadi (ALG)	14.66
400 metres hurdles	Tumi Ramokgoba (RSA)	57.97	Meryem Zahidi (MAR)	60.37	Chidinma Mary Innocent (NGR)	60.46
3000 metres steeplechase	Anatasha Cheptoo Langat (KEN)	9:27.8	Mercy Chepngeno Kosgei (KEN)	9:32.9	Sharon Chepkemoi (KEN)	9:34.3
4 × 100 metres relay	Nigeria (NGR); Lucy Chiamaka Nwankwo; Success Oyibu; Anita Enaruna; Chioma Cynthia Nweke	45.37	South Africa (RSA)	46.33	Ivory Coast (CIV); Chantal Djehi Lou; Ella Klah Dawa; Flora N'Guessan Amenan; Marie Joann Kouassi	46.59
4 × 400 metres relay	Nigeria (NGR); Odot Udoh; Toheebat Jimoh; Anita Enaruna; Favour Onyah	3:37.02	South Africa (RSA) ? Tumi Ramokgoba ? ?	3:44.99	Botswana (BOT)	
10,000 m walk	Imen Saai (TUN)	48:54.54	Aya Zenikhri (ALG)	51:34.94	Mona Ali Hussein (ETH)	51:54.58
High jump	Mia Davel (RSA); Martha Nkosi (RSA)	1.70	Not awarded		Hana Sakr (EGY)	1.60
Pole vault	Ansume de Beer (RSA)	4.00	Rasha Tamer Tawfik (EGY)	3.80	Tamer Reem (EGY)	3.20
Long jump	Prestina Oluchi Ochonogor (NGR)	6.71	Matsidiso Makgato (RSA)		Awa Zongo (BUR)	
Triple jump	Nassima Belkhadar (MAR)	12.63	Awa Zongo (BUR)	12.52	Temoso Masikane (RSA)	12.20
Shot put	Alicia Khunou (RSA)		[[]] (CMR)		[[]] (NGR)	
Discus throw	Alicia Khunou (RSA)	54.91	Ghofrane Lahmaedi (TUN)	49.69	Christie Loedolff (RSA)	47.07
Hammer throw	Anje Holtzhausen (RSA)	57.41	Kenza Falana (GAB)	55.42	Yeanecives Atse (CIV)	48.86
Javelin throw	Nicole Barnard (RSA)	50.92	Caroline Odwory (KEN)	46.05	Eze Peace Udochukwu (NGR)	44.49
Heptathlon	[[]] (NGR)		Manar Benaâmane (ALG)		[[]] (EGY)	

=== Mixed (U20) ===
Event	Gold		Silver		Bronze	
4 × 400 metres relay	Nigeria (NGR)	3:22.07	South Africa (RSA)	3:28.30	Botswana (BOT)	3:29.38

=== Boys (U18) ===
Event	Gold		Silver		Bronze	
100 metres (Wind: +0.1 m/s)	Mukona Manavhela (RSA)	10.61	Jayden Fourie (RSA)	10.76	James Clifford Igbigbidje (NGR)	10.89
200 metres (Wind: -0.7 m/s)	Mukona Manavhela (RSA)	21.29	Ibrahim Ajibare (NGR)	21.64	Destiny Egbon (NGR)	21.84
400 metres	Simeon Araka (KEN)	47.46	Odjer Tettey (GHA)	47.87	Robert Sang (KEN)	47.89
800 metres	Manases Koech (KEN)	1:48.22	Emil Els (RSA)	1:48.48	Lawi Ngetich (KEN)	1:49.21
1500 metres	Ngetich Lawi (KEN)	3:45.67	Emil Eles (RSA)	3:46.50	Samiel Gebrehamrma (ETH)	3:48.17
3000 metres	Emmanuel Kipkorir (KEN)	8:02.21	Alexander Ruesom (ERI)	8:04.14	Kevin Biwott (KEN)	8:07.56
110 metres hurdles (91.4 cm) (Wind: NWI)	Phenyo Miyen (RSA)	13.26 CR	Mohamed Benyaghzer (ALG)	13.88	Arthur Mahalalel Kwasi (GHA)	13.95
400 metres hurdles	Stiaan Myburgh (RSA)	52.71	Alexander Boateng Appiah (GHA)	53.89	Moussa Banour (MAR)	53.08
2000 metres steeplechase	Emmanuel Someki Lemiso (KEN)	5:32.24	Brian Ngetich (KEN)	5:38.05	Reda Ouzzaouit (MAR)	5:46.61
Medley relay (100+200+300+400)	South Africa (RSA) ? ? ? Stiaan Myburgh	1:53.52	Nigeria (NGR) ? ? ? Esan Solomon Tosin	1:55.55	Namibia (NAM) ? ? ? Jaco Potgieter	2:02.5
10,000 m walk	Youssef Anwar (EGY)	48:16.05	Mahrez Abdelkader (ALG)	48:16.69	Moutadhar Nalaoui (TUN)	48:20.00
High jump	Mateo Le Roux (RSA)	2.06	Chindowa Tatenda (ZIM)	2.03	Praise Ikweki (NGR)	2.03
Pole vault	Ibrahim Alyaldine (EGY)	4.10	Yousef Medhat (EGY)	4.10	Sadik Adem (ALG)	4.00
Long jump	Jayden Fourie (RSA)	7.43	Oghenerunor Gowon (NGR)	7.29	David Otim (UGA)	7.08
Triple jump	Takunda Mutizwa (ZIM)	14.96	Kelvin Bill Kipngeno (KEN)		Adam Ben Afia (TUN)	14.88
Shot put (5 kg)	Walter Van Rensburg (RSA)	19.04	Emmanuel Audu (NGR)	18.61	Yahya Sawabi (EGY)	17.65
Discus throw (1.5 kg)	Joshua Gerber (RSA)	64.48	Yahya Sawabi (EGY)	61.24	Success Okeleke (NGR)	52.85
Hammer throw (5 kg)	Djaber Bar (ALG)	67.02	François Pietersen (RSA)	64.72	Mohamed Boguira (MAR)	64.24
Javelin throw (700 g)	Jacobus van der Merwe (RSA)	70.31	Bamidele Oluwatobi (NGR)	61.77	Kamel Karim (EGY)	58.36
Octathlon	[[]] (25x17px)		Youba Benaâmar (ALG)		[[]] (25x17px)	

=== Girls (U18) ===
Event	Gold		Silver		Bronze	
100 metres (Wind: -0.4 m/s)	Miracle Ezechukwu (NGR)	11.88	Rosemary Chigozie Nwankwo (NGR)	11.96	Miriam Adefunke Jegede (NGR)	12.20
200 metres (Wind: -0.2 m/s)	Miracle Ezechukwu (NGR)	23.87	Rosemary Chigozie Nwankwo (NGR)	24.01	Perezide Sigah (NGR)	24.26
400 metres	Chioma Nwachukwu (NGR)	52.47	Hafsoh Majekodunmi (NGR)	54.43	Bisset Bikes (ETH)	55.31
800 metres	Elsabet Amare (ETH)	2:02.96	Vicody Chemutai (KEN)	2:05.34	[[]] (KEN)	2:09.08
1500 metres	Caren Jepchirchir (KEN)	4:11.58	Elsabet Amare (ETH)	4:12.81	Desta Tadele (ETH)	4:14.91
3000 metres	Cynthia Chepkurui (KEN)	9:26.35	Desta Tadele (ETH)		Birnesh Dessie (ETH)	
100 metres hurdles (76.2 cm) (Wind: NWI)	Megan Nieman (RSA)	13.84	Nokuthula Mthethwa (RSA)	14.35	Chniba Feriel (TUN)	14.80
400 metres hurdles	Rania El Mamdaoui (MAR)	59.89	Megan Nieman (RSA)	61.04	Esther Manu (25x17px)	61.37
2000 metres steeplechase	Clare Chepngetich (KEN)	6:33.2	Malak Ibrahim (EGY)	6:38.5	Mercy Mageso (KEN)	6:39.2
Medley relay (100+200+300+400)	Nigeria (NGR); Rosemary Nwankwo; Miracle Ezechukwu; Hafsoh Majekodunmi; Chioma Nwachukwu	2:08.16	South Africa (RSA) ? ? ? Daniela Viljoen	2:16.7	Botswana (BOT) ? ? ? Rose Gaopotake	2:24.8
5000 m walk	Hiwot Ambaw (ETH)	23:07.73	Mercyline Wanjala (KEN)	24:44.87	Fatima Lamsayeh (TUN)	25:03.48
High jump	Jordan Spolander (RSA)	1.80	Laila Merdan (EGY); Olemba Nguebong (CMR)	1.60	Not awarded	
Pole vault	Sichel Peens (RSA)	3.30	Hanin El Shboksi (EGY)	3.10	Only two starters	
Long jump	Oluchi Ndebaeze (RSA)	5.79	Kawtar Merzaq (MAR)	5.62	Sandrine Bouda (BUR)	5.25
Triple jump	Zalissa Zongo (BUR)	12.79	Kawtar Merzaq (MAR)	12.61	Feriel Chniba (TUN)	12.16
Shot put (3 kg)	Marike Weitz (NAM)	16.32	Alaa Tamer El Sayed (EGY)	14.58	Emerald Makua (NGR)	14.30
Discus throw	Mila Ueckermann (RSA)	52.99	Katr Ennada Jaoued (TUN)	48.28	Marike Weitz (NAM)	44.84
Hammer throw	Aya Amrane (ALG)	54.58	Mariam Reda Ahmed (EGY)	50.97	Ansune Smith (NAM)	47.48
Javelin throw	Aseel Ossama (EGY)	54.83	Remas Haytham (EGY)	50.97	Nicola van der Merwe (RSA)	48.30
Heptathlon	Anja Smit (RSA)		Zalissa Zongo (BUR)		Narimene Djalit (ALG)	

== Medal table (U20) ==
* Host nation (Nigeria)

Rank	NOC	Gold	Silver	Bronze	Total
Totals (0 entries)		0	0	0	0

== Medal table (U18) ==
* Host nation (Nigeria)

Rank	NOC	Gold	Silver	Bronze	Total
Totals (0 entries)		0	0	0	0
