= 2026 USA Indoor Track and Field Championships =

2026 USA Track & Field Indoor Championships
- Dates: February 28–March 1 February 21–22, 2026 (Combined Events)
- Host city: Staten Island, New York; Indianapolis, Indiana (Combined Events)
- Venue: Ocean Breeze Athletic Complex; Indiana Farm Bureau Fall Creek Pavilion at Indiana State Fairgrounds (Combined Events)
- Level: Senior
- Type: Indoor
- Events: 28 (men: 14; women: 14)

The 2026 USA Indoor Track and Field Championships was held at the Ocean Breeze Athletic Complex on Staten Island, New York City from February 28–March 1 and February 21–22, 2026 (Combined Events) in Indianapolis, Indiana at the Indiana Farm Bureau Fall Creek Pavilion. Organized by USA Track and Field (USATF), it served as the indoor United States national championships in track and field and selection meet for the 2026 World Athletics Indoor Championships in Kuyavian–Pomeranian, Poland on 20–22 March 2026.

== Medal summary ==
=== Men's track ===
Event	Gold		Silver		Bronze	
60 metres	Jordan Anthony	6.45	Trayvon Bromell	6.47	Noah Lyles	6.51
60 metres hurdles	Dylan Beard	7.37 PB	Trey Cunningham	7.40	Jamal Britt	7.46 PB
400 metres	Khaleb McRae	45.01	Chris Robinson	45.36	TJ Tomlyanovich	45.77
800 metres	Cooper Lutkenhaus	1:46.68	Sean Dolan	1:47.16	Isaiah Harris	1:47.22
1500 metres	Nathan Green	3:37.65	Luke Houser	3:37.67	Vincent Ciattei	3:37.73
3000 metres	Cole Hocker	7:39.25	Yared Nuguse	7:39.28	Nico Young	7:39.29
5000 metres race walk	Nick Christie	19:13.37	Jordan Crawford	21:15.02	Anthony Joseph Gruttadauro	25:21.38

=== Men's field ===
Event	Gold		Silver		Bronze	
High jump	Elijah Kosiba	2.24 m (7 ft 4 in)	Caleb Snowden	2.21 m (7 ft 3 in)	Kason O'Riley	2.21 m (7 ft 3 in)
Pole vault	Zach Bradford	6.01 m (19 ft 8 1/2 in) MR PB	KC Lightfoot Chris Nilsen	5.85 m (19 ft 2 1/4 in)	Not awarded	
Long jump	Steffin McCarter	8.10 m (26 ft 6 3/4 in)	Jeremiah Davis	8.08 m (26 ft 6 in)	Isaac Grimes	8.00 m (26 ft 2 3/4 in)
Triple jump	Russell Robinson	16.59 m (54 ft 5 in)	James Carter	16.24 m (53 ft 3 1/4 in)	Chauncey Chambers	15.73 m (51 ft 7 1/4 in)
Shot put	Roger Steen	21.81 m (71 ft 6 1/2 in)	Jordan Geist	21.72 m (71 ft 3 in)	Josh Awotunde	21.06 m (69 ft 1 in)
Weight throw	Isaiah Rogers	23.41 m (76 ft 9 1/2 in)	Konner Wood	22.92 m (75 ft 2 1/4 in)	Nathan Williams	22.44 m (73 ft 7 1/4 in)
Heptathlon	Hakim McMorris	6255 points	Heath Baldwin	6245 points	Justin Abrams	5937 points

=== Women's track ===
Event	Gold		Silver		Bronze	
60 metres	Jacious Sears	7.04	Mia Maxwell	7.13 PB	Mariah Maxwell	7.14 PB
60 metres hurdles	Alia Armstrong	7.82	Danae Dyer	7.92 PB	Amber Hughes	7.98
400 metres	Rosey Effiong	51.53	Bailey Lear	51.60	Paris Peoples	51.65 PB
800 metres	Addison Wiley	1:59.43 PB	Valery Tobias	1:59.77	Meghan Hunter	2:00.03
1500 metres	Nikki Hiltz	4:11.34	Gracie Morris	4:11.39	Lindsey Butler	4:11.52
3000 metres	Emily Mackay	8:30.01 MR PB	Elle Purrier St. Pierre	8:31.07	Margot Appleton	8:41.41
5000 metres race walk	Lauren Harris	22:14.69	Maria Michta-Coffey	23:30.42	Ruby Ray	25:01.87

=== Women's field ===
Event	Gold		Silver		Bronze	
High jump	Charity Hufnagel	1.96 m (6 ft 5 in) PB	Vashti Cunningham	1.93 m (6 ft 3 3/4 in)	Anna Hall	1.90 m (6 ft 2 3/4 in)
Pole vault	Chloe Timberg	4.70 m (15 ft 5 in)	Jessica Mercier Emily Grove	4.55 m (14 ft 11 in)	Not awarded	
Long jump	Jasmine Moore	6.86 m (22 ft 6 in)	Monae' Nichols	6.72 m (22 ft 1/2 in)	Claire Bryant	6.69 m (21 ft 11 1/4 in)
Triple jump	Jasmine Moore	13.89 m (45 ft 6 3/4 in)	Kayla Woods	13.50 m (44 ft 3 1/4 in) PB	Ryann Porter	13.50 m (44 ft 3 1/4 in)
Shot put	Chase Jackson	20.44 m (67 ft 1/2 in) MR NR	Abria Smith	19.23 m (63 ft 1 in) PB	Jaida Ross	18.43 m (60 ft 5 1/2 in)
Weight throw	Jalani Davis	24.84 m (81 ft 5 3/4 in)	Elisia Lancaster	22.78 m (74 ft 8 3/4 in)	Kali Terza	22.50 m (73 ft 9 3/4 in)
Pentathlon	Anna Hall	4831 points	Timara Chapman	4603 points	Erin Marsh	4432 points

== Schedule ==
Event schedule
DAY ONE—SATURDAY, February 21
Time (EST)	Men / Women	Event
12:00 PM	M	Heptathlon (60m)
12:40 PM	M	Heptathlon (Long Jump)
1:20 PM	M	Heptathlon (Shot Put)
2:00 PM	M	Heptathlon (High Jump)
DAY TWO—SUNDAY, February 22
11:00 AM	W	Pentathlon (60m Hurdles)
11:30 AM	M	Heptathlon (60m Hurdles)
12:15 PM	W	Pentathlon (High Jump)
12:45 PM	M	Heptathlon (Pole Vault)
1:45 PM	W	Pentathlon (Shot Put)
3:00 PM	W	Heptathlon (Long Jump)
3:30 PM	M	Heptathlon (1000m)
4:00 PM	W	Pentathlon (800m)

Event schedule STREAMING ON USATF.TV
DAY ONE—SATURDAY, February 28
Track Events
Time (EST)	Men / Women	Event	Division Round
11:30 AM	M	5000m RW	Final
12:00 AM	W	5000m RW	Final
12:40 PM	W	800m	Semi-Final
1:14 PM	M	800m	Semi-Final
1:44 PM	W	3000m	Final
1:57 PM	W	400m	Semi-Final
2:35 PM	W	60m Hurdles	Semi-Final
3:01 PM	M	60m Hurdles	Semi-Final
3:30 PM	M	3000m	Final
3:48 PM	M	400m	Semi-Final
4:35 PM	W	60m Hurdles	Final
4:45 PM	M	60m Hurdles	Final
Field Events
12:00 PM	W	High Jump	Final
12:45 PM	W	Weight Throw	Final
2:05 PM	M	Pole Vault	Final
2:20 PM	M	Triple Jump	Final
3:05 PM	W	Long Jump	Final
3:15 PM	W	Shot Put	Final
DAY TWO—SUNDAY, March 1 STREAMING ON USATF.TV UNTIL 1:00 PM ET, ON TV FROM 1:00 PM - 3:00 PM ET
Track Events
1:05 PM	W	60m	Semi-Final
1:21 PM	M	60m	Semi-Final
1:41 PM	W	800m	Final
1:49 PM	M	800m	Final
1:56 PM	W	400m	Final
2:09 PM	M	400m	Final
2:23 PM	W	1500m	Final
2:32 PM	M	1500m	Final
2:43 PM	W	60m	Final
2:52 PM	M	60m	Final
Field Events
11:00 AM	M	High Jump	Final
11:05 AM	W	Weight Throw	Final
12:35 PM	W	Pole Vault	Final
1:10 PM	W	Triple Jump	Final
1:25 PM	M	Shot Put	Final
1:36 PM	M	Long Jump	Final

== Qualification ==
All qualifying performances for the Championships must be attained during the following time periods:

- All other events: Monday, November 1, 2025 - Sunday, February 22, 2026

Event	Men's standard	Women's standard	Max entrants	Rounds
60 m	6.75	7.35	24	2
60 m hurdles	7.90	8.35	24	2
400 m	47.50	54.00	20	2
800 m	1:48.75	2:04.00	24	2
1500 m	3:39.00 mile 3:56.85	4:14.50 mile 4:35.00	12	1
3000 m	7:50.00	9:02.00	16	1
5000 m (alt event)	13:05.00	14:50.00		
5,000 m race walk	22:30.00	25:51.00	16	1
High Jump	2.15 m (7 ft 1/2 in)	1.78 m (5 ft 10 in)	12	1
Pole Vault	5.50 m (18 ft 1/2 in)	4.35 m (14 ft 3 1/4 in)	12	1
Long Jump	7.70 m (25 ft 3 in)	6.20 m (20 ft 4 in)	12	1
Triple Jump	15.50 m (50 ft 10 in)	12.80 m (41 ft 11 3/4 in)	12	1
Shot Put	18.90 m (62 ft 0 in)	16.50 m (54 ft 1 1/2 in)	12	1
Weight Throw	21.00 m (68 ft 10 3/4 in)	21.00 m (68 ft 10 3/4 in)	12	1
Heptathlon/Pentathlon	5450 points	3900 points	12	1
