= Miracle Ezechukwu =

Nigerian athlete (born 2008)

Personal information
- Nationality: Nigerian
- Born: 10 August 2008 (age 18)

Sport
- Sport: Athletics
- Event: Sprinter

Achievements and titles
- Personal bests: 100m: 11.15 (2026); 200m: 22.77 (2026)
Medal record
Women's athletics
Representing Nigeria
African Championships
| Gold medal – first place | 2026 Accra | 4 x 100m relay |
Islamic Solidarity Games
| Gold medal – first place | 2025 Riyadh | 4 x 100m relay |
African U18 Championships
| Gold medal – first place | 2025 Abeokuta | 100m |
| Gold medal – first place | 2025 Abeokuta | 200m |
| Gold medal – first place | 2025 Abeokuta | Medley Relay |

Miracle Oluebube Ezechukwu (born 10 August 2008) is a Nigerian sprinter. She won gold medals over 100 metres and 200 metres at the 2025 African U18 Championships.

== Biography ==
Born in Anambra, she won a scholarship through N-Youth Sports Academy to study at the Nigerian Tulip International School in Abuja having impressed at the National Youth Games in 2019. She was later reported to have accepted a scholarship offer from Auburn University in the United States in 2025. She won a sprint double over 100 metres and 200 metres at the 2025 African U18 U20 Championships in Abeokuta. She ran a personal best 23.87 seconds to win the 200 m title.

In March 2026, Ezechukwu successfully defended her junior 100m title at the MTN CHAMPS Continental Relays in Jos with a time of 11.42 seconds in the final, having earlier set a personal best of 11.26s in the semi-final, a new MTN CHAMPS U-20 record. In May, she ran at the 2026 World Athletics Relays in the women's 4 × 100 metres relay in Gaborone, Botswana. Later that month, Ezechukwu was part of the Nigerian Women’s 4 x 100 metres relay team which won the gold medal at the 2026 African Championships in Athletics in Accra, Ghana.

Going into the Nigerian Senior Championships, Ezechukwu was widely regarded as a teenage sensation to watch. In the 100m, she set a new personal best of 11.16 seconds in the semi-final before improving to 11.15 seconds in the final, where she claimed the silver medal against a field of established senior athletes. In the 200m, she emerged as the national champion, winning the event in a personal-best time of 22.77 seconds.

Ezechukwu was originally scheduled to be the Nigerian flag bearer for the opening ceremony of the 2026 Commonwealth Games in Glasgow, Scotland but it later went to the swimmer, Abdul Jabar Adama. Competing in the 100 metres at the at the Games, she reached the semi-finals. Later at the Games, she also competed in the women's 4 × 100 m relay.

At the 2026 World U20 Championships in Eugene, she was entered only in the 200 metres, where she finished second in the semi-final behind Shanoya Douglas, running the second-fastest time of 22.61 seconds. She was later disqualified for a lane infringement, losing her place in the final. Later in the competition, she anchored the Nigerian team in the mixed 4×100m relay to a fourth-place finish in a new U20 African record of 41.77 seconds. However, the team was disqualified because Perfect Faye competed in spikes that were not approved by World Athletics. In the women's 4×100m relay semi-final, she ran a split of 9.81 seconds to edge out the USA and help Nigeria reach the final. However, the team was disqualified in the final due to Lucy Nwankwo's false start.
