= Success Oghene Oyibu =

Nigerian track and field athlete (born 2007)

Personal information
- Nationality: Nigerian
- Born: 27 July 2007 (age 19)
- Education: Baylor University

Sport
- Sport: Athletics
- Event: Sprinter

Achievements and titles
- Personal bests: 100m: 11.44 (2026); 200m: 22.94 (2026)
Medal record
Women's athletics
Representing Nigeria
African U18 Championships
Silver medal – second place	2025 Abeokuta	100m
Gold medal – first place	2025 Abeokuta	200m
Gold medal – first place	2025 Abeokuta	4x100m relay

Success Oghene Oyibu (born 27 July 2007) is a Nigerian track and field athlete. She won one silver medal and two gold medals in the 100 meters, 200 meters, and 4×100 meters relay at the 2025 U20 African Championships held in Abeokuta, Nigeria. In 2025, she joined Baylor University.

== Career ==
Her career began at the MTN Championships held in Benin City, where she delivered a strong performance before signing with Baylor University. Oyibu qualified through the trials, and in 2025, she led a Nigerian sweep at the African U20 Championships in Abeokuta, winning the 200 m with a new personal best of 23.58 seconds. She also clinched silver in the 100 m and anchored Nigeria's 4 × 100 m relay team to gold with a time of 45.58 seconds. She is currently a freshman.

In April 2026, at the Michael Johnson Invitational, she ran a wind-aided personal best of 11.19 seconds (+2.8 m/s), finishing second behind Janae De Gannes.

Oyibu advanced to the final at the 2026 World U20 Championships, finishing fifth in the event with a time of 23.27 seconds.
