= Wosane Asefa =

Ethiopian athlete (born 2007)

Personal information
- Nationality: Ethiopian
- Born: 7 March 2007 (age 19)

Sport
- Sport: Athletics
- Event: 3000 m steeplechase

Achievements and titles
- Personal bests: 3000 m Steeplechase: 9:20.83 (Hengelo, 2025)
Medal record
Women's athletics
Representing Ethiopia
World U20 Championships
Silver medal – second place	2026 Eugene	3000 m st.
World Cross Country Championships
Silver medal – second place	2026 Tallahassee	U20 race

Wosane Asefa (born 3 July 2007) is an Ethiopian steeplechaser and cross country runner.

== Biography ==
Asefa placed seventh in the final of the 3000 metres steeplechase at the 2024 African Championships in Douala, Cameroon.

Asefa won the 3000m steeplechase final in a lifetime best of 9:30.68 at the Kip Keino Classic in Nairobi, Kenya, on 31 May 2025. She ran a personal best for the 3000 metres steeplechase of 9:20.83 in Hengelo, Netherlands, the following week, which placed her the second-fastest for an U20 athlete worldwide in 2025. Competing in the 2025 Diamond League, Asefa has a top-ten finish in August in the 3000 metres steeplechase at the 2025 Athletissima in wet conditions in Lausanne. That month, she placed seventh in the mile steeplechase at the 2025 Memorial Van Damme.

Asefa won the women's under-20 silver medal at the 2026 World Athletics Cross Country Championships in Tallahassee, finishing behind compatriot Marta Alemayo. In May, she represented Ethiopia at the 2026 African Championships in Athletics in Accra, Ghana, running 9:41.75 for the 3000 m steeplechase to finish in fourth place. In August 2026, she competed for Ethiopia at the 2026 World Athletics U20 Championships in the 3000 metres steeplechase, winning the silver medal.
