= Ema Bendová =

Slovak athlete (born 2007)

Personal information
- Born: 26 February 2007 (age 19)

Sport
- Sport: Athletics
- Events: Sprint, Long jump

Achievements and titles
- Personal bests: 60m: 7.34 s (Vienna, 2026); 100m: 11.39 s (Banská Bystrica, 2026); 200m: 23.51 s (Eugene, 2026); Long jump : 6.41 m (Trnava, 2026)

Ema Bendová (born 26 February 2007) is a Slovak sprinter and long jumper. She became senior national champion at the 2026 Slovak Indoor Championships in the 200 metres.

== Biography ==
From Bratislava, she is coached by her mother Naďa Bendová. Her father Andrej and older brother Jakub also competed in athletics, and she began to compete at a young age. She is a member of KĽŠ KRYHA Bratislava and represented Slovakia at the 2023 European Youth Summer Olympic Festival in Maribor.

In February 2024, Bendova jumped a personal best 5.94 cm in the long jump at the Slovak Indoor Championships. In July 2024, she was a finalist in the long jump at the 2024 European Athletics U18 Championships in Banská Bystrica, placing seventh overall having surpassed her previous personal best with 5.95 metres. The following year, she represented Slovakia in the 100 metres at the 2025 European Athletics U20 Championships.

At the Slovakia Indoor Championships in February 2026, she won the 200 metres title in 23.68 seconds, and placed third in the long jump with a jump of 5.92 metres. With her 200 m time, she improved her own Slovak junior indoor record by three tenths of second, and set a new meeting record, surpassing the previous record of 23.81 set by Lucie Ivanová in 2003. She jumped a new personal best in the long jump, going beyond six metres for the first time, in Vienna the following month, making a jump of 6.08 metres. She was selected for the 2026 World Athletics Indoor Championships in Poland.
