= 2024 World Athletics U20 Championships – Men's 400 metres hurdles =

Men's 400 metres hurdles at the 2024 World Athletics U20 Championships
- Venue: Estadio Atlético de la VIDENA
- Dates: 28 August 2024 (heats); 30 August 2024 (semi-finals); 31 August 2024 (final)
- Competitors: 49 from 35 nations
- Winning time: 49.26

Medalists
gold medal	Vance Nilsson	United States
silver medal	Michal Rada	Czech Republic
bronze medal	Antti Sainio	Finland

The men's 400 metres hurdles at the 2024 World Athletics U20 Championships was held at the Estadio Atlético de la VIDENA in Lima, Peru on 28, 30 and 31 August 2024.

== Records ==
U20 standing records prior to the 2024 World Athletics U20 Championships were as follows:

Record	Athlete & Nationality	Mark	Location	Date
World U20 Record	Roshawn Clarke (JAM)	47.34	Budapest, Hungary	21 August 2023
Championship Record	Kerron Clement (USA)	48.51	Grosseto, Italy	16 July 2004
World U20 Leading	Njabulo Mbatha (RSA)	49.57	Pietermaritzburg, South Africa	19 April 2024

== Results ==
=== Heats ===
The first 3 athletes in each heat (Q) and the next 3 fastest (q) qualified to the semi-final.

==== Heat 1 ====
Rank	Lane	Athlete	Nation	Time	Notes
1	9	Michal Rada	Czech Republic	52.26	Q
2	2	Ramón Fuenzalida	Chile	52.58	Q
3	6	Paolo Bolognesi	Italy	52.84	Q
4	7	Murad Sirman	India	52.85	
5	8	Muh. Najmi	Malaysia	53.47	
6	3	Muqtada Ai-Hiaich	Iraq	54.33	
7	4	Colin Zumbühl	Switzerland	54.42	
–	5	Thomas Canivet	France	DNS	

==== Heat 2 ====
Rank	Lane	Athlete	Nation	Time	Notes
1	9	Daniel Wright	Jamaica	51.42	Q
2	3	Jingwei Guo	China	51.72	Q
3	6	Mitja Zubin	Slovenia	51.90	Q
4	8	Akalanka Kuda Liyanage	Sri Lanka	52.04	q
5	5	Dorian Charles	Trinidad and Tobago	53.65	
6	7	Karthik Arumugam	India	53.75	
7	2	Mahamat Abdrahman	Qatar	54.26	
8	4	Evian Solorzano	Peru	59.10	PB

==== Heat 3 ====
Rank	Lane	Athlete	Nation	Time	Notes
1	7	Kairi Gonda	Japan	51.21	Q
2	6	Sam Lunt	Great Britain	51.87	Q
3	3	Ali Alrumayh	Saudi Arabia	52.43	Q
4	4	David Davitt (Note: David Davitt did not originally qualify for the semi-finals however due to Vladimiros Andreadis opting to take no further part in the competition Davitt was placed in to Heat 2 of the semi-finals.)	Ireland	52.51	
5	8	Zakaria Sabir	Morocco	52.56	
6	9	Abbas Alkhawaf	Iraq	53.46	
7	5	Roineld Lara	Venezuela	53.69	
–	2	David Friederich	Luxembourg	DNS	

==== Heat 4 ====
Rank	Lane	Athlete	Nation	Time	Notes
1	3	Vance Nilsson	United States	51.98	Q
2	7	Fintan Dewhirst	Ireland	52.39	Q
3	4	Lucas De Almeida	Brazil	52.76	Q
4	8	Edio Mussacate	Mozambique	53.15	
5	5	Alexis Perroud	Switzerland	53.74	
–	9	Abdennour Bourmaki	Algeria	DNS	
–	6	Xinfeng Xu	China	DNS	

==== Heat 5 ====
Rank	Lane	Athlete	Nation	Time	Notes
1	4	Antti Sainio	Finland	51.19	Q
2	8	Premier Wynn	United States	51.89	Q
3	2	Jose Eduardo Aguado	Mexico	52.09	Q
4	6	Cheyne West	Trinidad and Tobago	52.18	q, PB
5	5	Oussama Fagrach	Morocco	52.67	PB
6	7	Matthew Hunt	Australia	52.84	
7	9	Oseiwe Salami	Nigeria	54.06	
8	3	Ziad Bouhaddad	Algeria	54.62	

==== Heat 6 ====
Rank	Lane	Athlete	Nation	Time	Notes
1	9	Njabulo Mbatha	South Africa	51.42	Q
2	5	Joel Von De Ahé	Denmark	51.80	Q, NU20R
3	6	Maximiliano Nuñez	Mexico	52.09	Q
4	7	Trevoy Smith	Jamaica	52.15	q
5	3	David Damian	Romania	52.79	
6	8	José David Mosquera	Colombia	53.61	
7	4	Mahamat Mahamo	Qatar	54.44	

==== Heat 7 ====
Rank	Lane	Athlete	Nation	Time	Notes
1	8	Kyo Kikuta	Japan	51.24	Q
2	3	Joaquin Alonso	Spain	52.47	Q
3	9	Vladimiros Andreadis	Greece	52.51	Q
4	7	Naif Alsubaie	Saudi Arabia	53.56	
–	5	Jeong-hyun Kim	South Korea	DNF	
–	4	Ntiyiso Nkanyani	South Africa	DNF	
–	6	Giulio Vanarelli	Italy	DNF	

=== Semi-finals ===
The first 2 athletes in each heat (Q) and the next 2 fastest (q) qualified to the semi-final.

==== Heat 1 ====
Rank	Lane	Athlete	Nation	Time	Notes
1	8	Njabulo Mbatha	South Africa	49.90	Q
2	6	Sam Lunt	Great Britain	50.00	Q, NU20R
3	5	Kyo Kikuta	Japan	51.04	
4	3	Akalanka Kuda Liyanage	Sri Lanka	51.45	
5	4	Mitja Zubin	Slovenia	52.55	
6	2	Paolo Bolognesi	Italy	53.92	
7	9	Maximiliano Nuñez	Mexico	57.96	
–	7	Joel Von De Ahé	Denmark	DNS	

==== Heat 2 ====
Rank	Lane	Athlete	Nation	Time	Notes
1	6	Antti Sainio	Finland	49.36 (.351)	Q, WU20L
2	7	Michal Rada	Czech Republic	49.36 (.351)	Q, WU20L
3	8	Vance Nilsson	United States	49.82	q
4	9	Joaquin Alonso	Spain	50.22	q, NU20R
5	5	Fintan Dewhirst	Ireland	51.65	
6	3	David Davitt	Ireland	51.93	
7	4	Ali Alrumayh	Saudi Arabia	52.25	PB
8	2	Trevoy Smith	Jamaica	54.24	

==== Heat 3 ====
Rank	Lane	Athlete	Nation	Time	Notes
1	5	Daniel Wright	Jamaica	51.11	Q
2	9	Ramón Fuenzalida	Chile	51.33	Q, PB
3	8	Kairi Gonda	Japan	51.80	
4	4	Jose Eduardo Aguado	Mexico	52.27	
5	2	Lucas De Almeida	Brazil	52.67	PB
6	7	Premier Wynn	United States	52.76	
7	3	Cheyne West	Trinidad and Tobago	53.09	
8	6	Jingwei Guo	China	1:03.89	

=== Final ===
Rank	Lane	Athlete	Nation	Time	Notes
1st place, gold medalist(s)	2	Vance Nilsson	United States	49.26	WU20L
2nd place, silver medalist(s)	8	Michal Rada	Czech Republic	49.30	NU20R
3rd place, bronze medalist(s)	6	Antti Sainio	Finland	49.61	
4	5	Njabulo Mbatha	South Africa	49.68	
5	9	Sam Lunt	Great Britain	50.29	
6	3	Joaquin Alonso	Spain	51.00	
7	7	Daniel Wright	Jamaica	51.61	
–	4	Ramón Fuenzalida	Chile	DQ	TR22.6.1
