= 300 metres hurdles =

Type of footrace

Athletics 300 metres hurdles

World records
- Men: (Norway) Karsten Warholm 32.67 (2025)
- Women: (Netherlands) Femke Bol 36.86 (2022)

The 300 metres hurdles is a track and field hurdling event. It is a standard event under the NFHS in American high school competition and a championship level event in Masters athletics. The two iterations of the event vary somewhat. Common to all long hurdling events, the distance between hurdles is 35 metres.

In 2025, World Athletics announced that the 300 metres hurdles would become an official event, running the 7 hurdle version explained under Masters.

== High school ==
The high school version uses a standard 45 meter start to the first hurdle. Thus the high school race is equivalent to beginning of a standard 400 meter hurdle race, but its placement on the track is shifted 100 meters around the track so it finishes at the common finish line on the straightaway, where the longer race would reach the same point near the end of the second turn. There are 8 hurdles in the high school version, the last hurdle just 10 meters before the finish line.

High schools began adopting the longer hurdle event state by state starting in the 1960s. At the time, most which school competition was using United States customary units, so the race was the 330 yard hurdles and since that occurred before Title IX, competition was only for boys. By the mid-1970s girls competition had been added, but girls events were still undergoing a stage of evolution. Essentially the administrators did not know the capabilities of women and were overcautious not to put them into too difficult events. Metrication finally took hold in the NFHS in 1980, the last major sports governing body to adopt metric distances. The official distance became 300 meters, but many competitions continued to be in yards because the tracks were still marked for that distance.

Hurdle heights also have undergone a period of evolution. Until 1984, boys ran over low hurdles 30" in height. When girls were introduced to the event around 1981, they ran the same height as the boys until the boys height was raised to the full intermediate hurdle height of 36" for the 1984 season.

=== Record progression ===
All United States national record holders have been from California. Gayle Kellon is credited with the first record in 1982 at 41.09, set at the CIF California State Meet. Leslie Maxie improved upon the record in 1984, taking the record first to 40.90 then to 40.18. Her record held for 17 years until Lashinda Demus took the record below 40 to 39.98 in 2001, which remained until 2017 when Sydney McLaughlin broke it with a time of 38.90 at the Arcadia Invitational. She broke the national record by over a second.

Danny Harris had the low hurdle mark at 35.52, set in 1983 (just one year before he won the Olympic silver medal) when the 2 ft 6 in (0.76 m) height was terminated. The following year, George Porter ran 36.10 over the 3 ft 0 in (0.91 m) intermediate hurdles, but his 35.32 in 1985 is the first recognized record. That record held for 22 years until Jeshua Anderson finally nudged it down to 35.28 in 2007. Chasing Anderson to his record was sophomore Reggie Wyatt, who (after losing his junior year to ineligibility) took the record to 35.02 in 2009. All records took place in the finals of the CIF California State Meet except Porter's 35.32, which was set the week before qualifying to the meet. Wyatt set his record in the preliminary round anticipating his successful attempt to double in the 400 meters. In 2024, Vance Nilsson lowered the record to 34.83 at the Arizona Interscholastic Association State Championships. In April 2026, Andrew Jones ran a 34.72 at a Texas 6A area meet, acquiring the national record.

== Masters athletics ==
The Masters version of the race is different. The distance from the start line to the first hurdle is 50 metres, which makes all the hurdle marks in the same place as the last seven hurdles of the standard 400-metre version, thus Masters only go over seven hurdles. While men of all ages have run over 300 hurdles, the youngest official division to use the distance is M60. M60 and M65 run over 30-inch (76.2 cm) barriers, M70 and M75 run over 27-inch barriers. Prior to 2010, older age divisions also did 300 hurdles, though the number of competitors was small. In 2010, M80+ and women's W70+ moved to doing a 200-metre race over the last five barriers of either race, thus retiring the 300 hurdles for those divisions. By that time, 27-inch hurdles were embedded in the rulebook.

Women also do the 300 hurdles, W50 to W65 divisions. Like the men, the W50 and W55 divisions do 30-inch hurdles, W60 and W65 do 2 ft 3 in (0.68 m) (27 inch) hurdles, and W70+ do the 200-metre version over 27-inch hurdles.

Occasionally the event is held for top level athletes. Those races follow the Masters athletics model of the event over seven hurdles.

=== 27-inch hurdles ===
The idea of using 27-inch (68.6 cm) hurdles was introduced in Europe in 2000. The increment does not exist on standard hurdles, which caused resistance from some NGBs, but the rules were adopted worldwide. Many modern hurdles will not go to that height or would at least require modification to cut the hurdle. Most facilities that have spent thousands of dollars to buy regulation hurdles would certainly not let their hurdles be damaged like this. Since it is a requirement, major championship meets have purchased a few sets of modern modified hurdles, which then creates the logistical problem of shipping these few hurdles between meets in order for the competitors to have an opportunity to race over proper hurdles. As a substitute, many older hurdle designs are easier to modify to get to the proper height and most facilities are less protective of the old, rusty hurdles in the junk pile. Also many training hurdles (used to teach smaller, youth beginners) will go to 27 inches and lower.

=== Progression ===
The world record progressions for M60, M65 and M70 were dominated by Jack Greenwood for a decade as he passed through each division. Each was surpassed by Guido Müller when he reached the same age divisions. Müller's M60 record is 42.31; M65 is 43.88 and M70 is 45.24. Greenwood retired before reaching the M75 division, Müller turned 75 in December 2013 and now holds the M75 record at 49.65, lowering Earl Fee's record of 52.91. Before the event was retired for those divisions, in the M80 division, Fee had just beaten Dan Bulkley's decade-long record by running 56.92. The M85 division was held by Hugo Delgado Flores at 1:07.99 and Ilmari Koppinen had run 2:01.71 at M90.

The W50 division has been led by Brenda Parkinson, Jan Hynes and Christine Müller before Barbara Gähling set the current world record at 44.90. Corrie Roovers dominated the W55 and W60 division lists for a decade until Phil Raschker took the W55 with a 49.14 in 2002. After another decade, Jane Horder advanced the W55 record to 49.00 in 2012, and it now stands to Gähling at 46.74. By the time Raschker reached W60, Marge Allison had already put the record out to 51.64, and the great all-rounder Sue McDonald has now lowered it to 48.84. Allison also had the W65 record at 54.06 until Jane Horder set the current standard at 52.41. Florence Meiler had the W70 record at 1:07.16 and Johnnye Valien had the W75 record at 1:29.00 before the event was retired.

== All-time top 25 ==
=== Men ===
Rank	Result	Athlete	Nationality	Date	Place	Hurdles	Ref.
1	32.67	Karsten Warholm	Norway	12 June 2025	Oslo	7	
2	33.01	Alison Dos Santos	Brazil	16 May 2026	Shaoxing	7	
3	33.22	Rai Benjamin	United States	12 June 2025	Oslo	7	
4	33.75	Matheus Lima	Brazil	16 May 2026	Shaoxing	7	
5	33.84	Abderrahman Samba	Qatar	12 June 2025	Oslo	7	
6	34.02	Trevor Bassitt	United States	16 May 2026	Shaoxing	7	
7	34.14	Matic Ian Guček	Slovenia	16 May 2026	Shaoxing	7	
8	34.22	Ken Toyoda	Japan	26 April 2025	Xiamen	7	
9	34.34	Sabelo Dhlamini	South Africa	26 August 2025	Maribor	7	
10	34.48	Chris Rawlinson	Great Britain	30 June 2002	Sheffield	7	
11	34.50	Berke Akçam	Turkey	26 April 2025	Xiamen	7	
12	34.51	Caleb Dean	United States	16 May 2026	Shaoxing	7	
13	34.53	CJ Allen	United States	16 May 2026	Shaoxing	7	
14	34.58	Emil Agyekum	Germany	12 June 2025	Oslo	7	
15	34.6 h	David Hemery	Great Britain	15 September 1972	London	7	
16	34.7 h	Thomas Goller	Germany	13 May 2001	Pliezhausen	7	
17	34.72	Andrew Jones	United States	19 April 2026	Tomball	8	
18	34.75	Carl Bengtström	Sweden	26 April 2025	Xiamen	7	
19	34.8 h	Ockert Cilliers	South Africa	8 May 2005	Pliezhausen	7	
20	34.83	Vance Nilsson	United States	11 May 2024	Mesa	8	
20	34.83	Mario Lambrughi	Italy	13 April 2024	Milan	7	
22	34.87	Kariem Hussein	Switzerland	25 May 2017	Langenthal	7	
23	34.92 i OT	Llewellyn Herbert	South Africa	9 February 1999	Tampere	7	
24	34.94	Yeral Nuñez	Dominican Republic	1 April 2023	Santo Domingo	7	
25	34.95	Kyron McMaster	British Virgin Islands	26 April 2025	Xiamen	7	
25	34.95	Xie Zhiyu	China	26 April 2025	Xiamen	7	

==== Notes ====
Below is a list of other times equal or superior to 35.00:

- Karsten Warholm also ran 33.05 (2026), 33.05 (2025), 33.26 (2021), 33.28 (2024), 33.78 (2020), 34.26 OT i (2018).
- Alison Dos Santos also ran 33.38 (2025).
- Matheus Lima also ran 33.98 (2025), 34.34 (2025).
- Chris Rawlinson also ran 34.59 (2000).
- Trevor Bassitt also ran 34.65 (2025).
- Berke Akçam also ran 34.95 (2025).
- Thomas Goller also ran a hand-timed 35.0 (2000).

=== Women ===
Rank	Result	Athlete	Nationality	Date	Place	Hurdles	Ref.
1	36.86	Femke Bol	Netherlands	31 May 2022	Ostrava	7	
2	37.40	Anna Cockrell	United States	8 May 2026	Fayetteville	7	
3	38.16	Zuzana Hejnová	Czech Republic	2 August 2013	Cheb	7	
4	38.24	Viktoriya Tkachuk	Ukraine	31 May 2022	Ostrava	7	
5	38.30	Gianna Woodruff	Panama	8 May 2026	Fayetteville	7	
6	38.36	Anna Ryzhykova	Ukraine	31 May 2022	Ostrava	7	
7	38.50	Viivi Lehikoinen	Finland	31 May 2022	Ostrava	7	
8	38.55	Dalilah Muhammad	United States	8 May 2026	Fayetteville	7	
9	38.6 h	Mame Tacko Diouf	Senegal	21 February 1999	Dakar	7	
10	38.66	Paulien Couckuyt	Belgium	18 July 2026	Heusden-Zolder	7	
11	38.69	Shiann Salmon	Jamaica	18 July 2026	Heusden-Zolder	7	
12	38.75	Lina Nielsen	Great Britain	26 May 2023	St. Pölten	7	
13	38.84	Jessie Knight	Great Britain	31 May 2022	Ostrava	7	
14	38.87	Eileen Demes	Germany	5 May 2024	Pliezhausen	8	
15	38.9 h	Stephanie Kampf	Germany	12 May 2002	Pliezhausen	8	
15	38.90	Sydney McLaughlin	United States	8 April 2017	Arcadia	8	
17	38.93	Léa Sprunger	Switzerland	3 August 2016	Langenthal	7	
18	38.97	Line Kloster	Norway	27 May 2018	Lillestrøm	7	
18	38.97	Emma Zapletalová	Slovakia	8 September 2020	Ostrava	7	
20	38.99	Denisa Rosolova	Czech Republic	12 May 2015	Sušice	7	
21	39.00	Jana Pittman	Australia	11 July 2004	Meilen	7	
21	39.00	Marzia Caravelli	Italy	25 April 2014	Rome	7	
23	39.03	Ayomide Folorunso	Italy	21 April 2018	La Spezia	7	
24	39.08	Georganne Moline	United States	9 July 2020	Walnut	7	
25	39.09	Yadisleidy Pedroso	Italy	3 May 2013	Florence	7	

==== Notes ====
Below is a list of other times equal or superior to 39.09:

- Femke Bol also ran 38.55 (2020).
- Zuzana Hejnová also ran 38.75 (2013), 38.91 (2011), 38.98 (2017).
