= 2024 World Athletics U20 Championships – Men's 4 × 400 metres relay =

Men's 4 × 400 metres relay at the 2024 World Athletics U20 Championships
- Venue: Estadio Atlético de la VIDENA
- Dates: 30 August 2024 (heats); 31 August 2024 (final
- Competitors: 88 from 20 nations
- Winning time: 3:03.56

Medalists
gold medal	Jayden Davis; Xavier Donaldson; Alexander Rhodes; Sidi Njie; Grant Buckmiller*; Gabriel J Clement II*	United States
silver medal	Bryan Katoo; Sihle Mahlangu; Niabulo Mbatha; Udeme Okon; Kryn Romijn*	South Africa
bronze medal	Caleb Kilpatrick; Jett Grundy; Jack Deguara; Jordan Gilbert	Australia

The men's 4 × 400 metres relay at the 2024 World Athletics U20 Championships was held at the Estadio Atlético de la VIDENA in Lima, Peru on 30 and 31 August 2024.

== Records ==
U20 standing records prior to the 2024 World Athletics U20 Championships were as follows:

Record	Nation	Mark	Location	Date
World U20 Record	United States	3:00.33	Trujillo, Peru	23 July 2017
Championship Record	United States	3:01.09	Grosseto, Italy	18 July 2024
World U20 Leading	United States	3:01.68	Gainesville, United States	30 March 2024

== Results ==
=== Heats ===
First 2 of each heat (Q) plus the 2 fastest times (q) qualified for the final.

==== Heat 1 ====
Rank	Nation	Athletes	Time	Notes
1	Australia	Caleb Kilpatrick, Jett Grundy, Jack Deguara, Jordan Gilbert	3:08.99	Q, SB
2	Poland	Wiktor Wróbel, Michał Kijewski, Adrian Wójciak, Stanisław Strzelecki	3:10.71	Q
3	Jamaica	Shadane Smith, Omary Robinson, Javaughn Pinnock, Kemarrio Bygrave	3:11.30	
4	Spain	David García, Adrian Priego, Joe Pons, Biel Cirujeda	3:11.45	SB
5	Grenada	Qwanell Pierre, Kemron Mathlyn, Devonie Ferguson, Joshem Sylvester	3:16.67	
6	Peru	Anderson Tavara, Jeffrey Cajo, Giancarlo Bravo, Matias Villar	3:17.63	PB
–	Italy	Simone Gilberto, Luca Marsicovetere, Riccardo Fumagalli, Francesco De Santis	DQ	TR24.6

==== Heat 2 ====
Rank	Nation	Athletes	Time	Notes
1	United States	Grant Buckmiller, Xavier Donaldson, Gabriel J Clement II, Alexander Rhodes	3:05.16	Q, SB
2	South Africa	Bryan Katoo, Sihle Mahlangu, Kryn Romijn, Udeme Okon	3:08.84	Q, SB
3	Ireland	Conor Kelly, Adam Courtney, Sean Doggett, Stephen Mannion	3:08.94	q, NU20R
4	Germany	Max Husseman, Fabian Straberg, Tom Stöber, Cedric Barth	3:08.98 (.978)	q
5	Guyana	Malachi Austin, Kaidon Persaud, Gil De Neilson, Enock Munroe	3:11.38	NU20R
6	Saudi Arabia	Naif Alsubaie, Meshal Hazazi, Musaad Al-Subaie, Ali Almuwallad	3:13.19	SB
7	Thailand	Nonthawat Phakdeechit, Khunaphat Kaijan, Namchok Phuphaeng, Phiraphat Ponjon	3:18.81	

==== Heat 3 ====
Rank	Nation	Athletes	Time	Notes
1	Japan	Ryota Oishi, Kentaro Shirahata, Kairi Gonda, Kyo Kikuta	3:07.04	Q, SB
2	India	Rihan Chaudhary, Ankul, Abiram Pramod, Jay Kumar	3:08.10	Q, NU20R
3	Botswana	Lefatshe Seleka, Keorapetse Oreokame, Justice Oratile, Thabang Monngathipa	3:08.98 (.978)	q, SB
4	Qatar	Mahamat Maha, Khalid Adoum, Oussama Swakar, Maizen Ali	3:11.45	
5	Trinidad and Tobago	Joshua Perry, Daeshaun Cole, Dorian Charles, Kyrell Thomas	3:11.67	
6	Brazil	Paulo Romualdo, Marcus Velasco, Carlos Eduardo Domingos, Victor Chaves	3:12.68	SB

=== Final ===
Rank	Nation	Athletes	Time	Notes
1st place, gold medalist(s)	United States	Jayden Davis, Xavier Donaldson, Alexander Rhodes, Sidi Njie	3:03.56	SB
2nd place, silver medalist(s)	South Africa	Bryan Katoo, Sihle Mahlangu, Niabulo Mbatha, Udeme Okon	3:05.22	SB
3rd place, bronze medalist(s)	Australia	Caleb Kilpatrick, Jett Grundy, Jack Deguara, Jordan Gilbert	3:05.53	SB
4	Poland	Jakub Szarapo, Michał Kijewski, Jan Śmietanka, Stanisław Strzelecki	3:06.37	SB
5	Japan	Ryota Oishi, Kentaro Shirahata, Kairi Gonda, Kyo Kikuta	3:06.94	SB
6	India	Rihan Chaudhary, Ankul, Abiram Pramod, Jay Kumar	3:08.76	
7	Ireland	Conor Kelly, David Davitt, Sean Doggett, Stephen Mannion	3:09.73	
8	Germany	Max Husseman, Fabian Straberg, Tom Stöber, Cedric Barth	3:14.04	
–	Botswana	Lefatshe Seleka, Keorapetse Oreokame, Justice Oratile, Enerst Kumevu	DQ	TR24.19
