= Taiju Goto =

Japanese athlete (born 2009)

Personal information
- Born: 5 May 2009 (age 17)

Sport
- Sport: Athletics
- Event: Hurdles

Achievements and titles
- Personal bests: 400 m hurdles: 47.93 (2026) WU18B
Medal record
Men's athletics
Representing Japan
Asian Games
Silver medal – second place	2026 Nagoya	400 m hurdles
World U20 Championships
Silver medal – second place	2026 Eugene	400 m hurdles
Asian U20 Championships
Gold medal – first place	2026 Hong Kong	400 m hurdles

Taiju Goto (born 5 May 2009) is a Japanese hurdler, who primarily competes over 400 metres hurdles. In 2026, he set a world under-18 best and Asian under-20 best time to win the silver medal at the 2026 Asian Games.

He won the senior Japanese Athletics Championships in 2026 as a 17 year-old and was also a silver medalist in the 400 metres hurdles at the 2026 World Athletics U20 Championships.

== Biography ==
In May 2026, Goto ran 49.34 seconds for the 400 metres hurdles in Osaka. Aged 17 years-old, Goto competed at the 2026 Asian U20 Athletics Championships, where he ran 49.25 seconds in the 400 metres hurdles to set a new meeting record, surpassing the previous best set by Ismail Doudai Abakar of Qatar in 2023. The following month, he set a new world U18 best with a time of 48.31 seconds for the 400 metres hurdles at the Japanese Athletics Championships in Aichi Prefecture before improving to win the title in 48.09 seconds, becoming the Japanese champion at the age of 17 years-old competing against senior athletes.

In August 2026, he was a finalist in the 400 metres hurdles at the 2026 World Athletics U20 Championships in Eugene, Oregon, winning the silver medal in 49.23 seconds behind Czech athlete Michal Rada. In September at the 2026 Asian Games in Nagoya, Japan, Goto won the silver medal with a new U18 world record and Asian U20 record of 47.93 seconds, finishing close behind Bassem Hemeida of Qatar on the finishing line.
