= Athletics at the 2026 Asian Games – Men's 400 metres hurdles =

Men's 400 metres hurdles at the 2026 Asian Games
- Venue: Mizuho Park Athletic Stadium, Nagoya
- Date: 27–28 September 2026
- Competitors: 18 from 12 nations
- Winning time: 47.82

Medalists
gold medal	Bassem Hemeida	Qatar
silver medal	Taiju Goto	Japan
bronze medal	Lin Chung-wei	Chinese Taipei

The men's 400 metres hurdles competition at the 2026 Asian Games took place on 27 and 28 September 2026 at the Nagoya City Mizuho Park Athletic Stadium in Nagoya, Japan. In total, 18 athletes from 12 countries took part in the event.

Bassem Hemeida of Qatar won the gold medal in a time of 47.82 s. Taiju Goto of Japan and Lin Chung-wei of Chinese Taipei won the silver and bronze medals, respectively. In finishing as runner-up, Goto set a new Asian under-20 record for the event at 47.93 s.

== Background ==
The atletics events were held at the Nagoya City Mizuho Park Athletic Stadium in Nagoya, Japan from 23 to 29 September 2026.

Abderrahman Samba of Qatar was the defending champion after winning the gold medal at the 2022 Asian Games in Hangzhou.

== Round 1 ==
The heats took place on 27 September at 12.05pm. The two fastest athletes from each heat plus the next two fastest advanced to the final. Taiju Goto set the fastest time (48.60 s) in the first round. Other medal contenders Lin Chung-wei ran 49.10 s and Bassem Hemeida ran 49.55 s. Santhosh Kumar Tamilarasan, Kazuki Kurokawa and Chen Jian-rong also advanced to the final as winners and runners-up from their heats. Akalanka Kuda Liyanage and Vyacheslav Zems advanced to the final as the next two fastest runners. Abderrahman Alsaleck was the only athlete not to set a time as he did not finish his heat.

=== Heat 1 ===
Place	Lane	Athlete	Nation	Time	Notes
1	3	Lin Chung-wei	Chinese Taipei	49.10	Q
2	7	Santhosh Kumar Tamilarasan	India	49.61	Q
3	6	Akalanka Kuda Liyanage	Sri Lanka	49.78	q
4	4	Vyacheslav Zems	Kazakhstan	50.47	q, PB
5	2	Jazzpeer Arcenal	Philippines	51.47	
6	5	Cheung Long Hei Cyrus	Hong Kong	53.38	SB

=== Heat 2 ===
Place	Lane	Athlete	Nation	Time	Notes
1	6	Bassem Hemeida	Qatar	49.55	Q
2	7	Kazuki Kurokawa	Japan	50.26	Q
3	3	Mohammed Al Muawi	Saudi Arabia	50.63	SB
4	4	Chan Chun Ho	Hong Kong	50.70	PB
5	5	Basel Selmi	Palestine	56.24	PB
—	2	Yashas Palaksha	India	DNF	

=== Heat 3 ===
Place	Lane	Athlete	Nation	Time	Notes
1	3	Taiju Goto	Japan	48.60	Q
2	5	Chen Jian-rong	Chinese Taipei	50.16	Q
3	7	Naif Alsubaie	Saudi Arabia	51.98	
4	2	Muchammadrisoi Mirsosoda	Tajikistan	52.87	
5	4	Cheong Chi Chong	Malaysia	52.98	
—	6	Abderrahman Alsaleck	Qatar	DNF	

== Final ==
The final took place on 28 September at 7.33pm. Hemeida ran 47.82 s to win the gold medal. Goto ran an Asian under-20 record time of 47.93 s to win the silver medal and Chung-wei ran a personal best of 49.25 to win the bronze medal.

Place	Lane	Athlete	Nation	Time	Notes
1st place, gold medalist(s)	8	Bassem Hemeida	Qatar	47.82	
2nd place, silver medalist(s)	6	Taiju Goto	Japan	47.93	AU20R
3rd place, bronze medalist(s)	5	Lin Chung-wei	Chinese Taipei	48.74	PB
4	9	Chen Jian-rong	Chinese Taipei	49.25	PB
5	2	Akalanka Kuda Liyanage	Sri Lanka	49.37	
6	4	Kazuki Kurokawa	Japan	49.41	
7	7	Santhosh Kumar Tamilarasan	India	49.95	
8	3	Vyacheslav Zems	Kazakhstan	51.17	
