= Sidi Njie =

American athlete

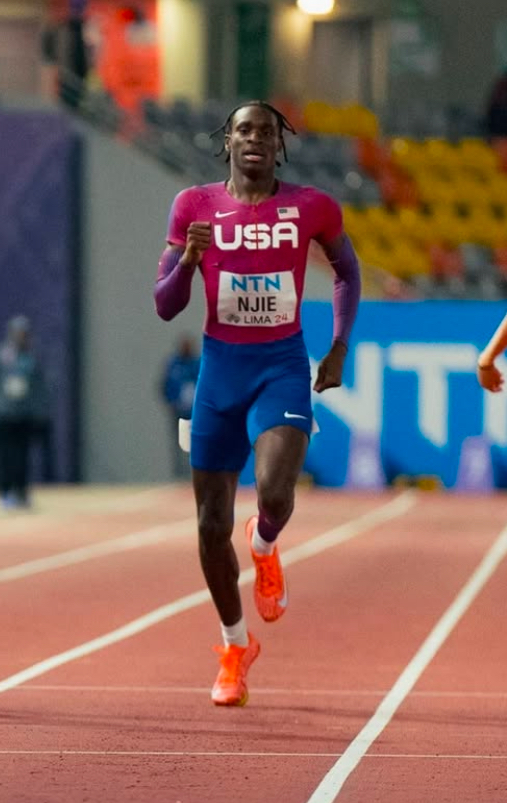
- Njie in 2024

Personal information
- Nationality: American
- Born: 20 February 2007 (age 19) Atlanta, Georgia, U.S.
- Education: Westlake High School (Atlanta, Georgia)
- Height: 6’2
- Weight: 170

Sport
- Sport: Athletics
- Event: Sprint

Achievements and titles
- Personal best(s): 200 m: 20.63 (2024); 400 m: 44.20 (2026)
Medal record
Men's athletics
Representing United States
World U20 Championships
Bronze medal – third place	2024 Lima	400m
Gold medal – first place	2024 Lima	4×400 m relay

Sidi Njie (born 20 February 2007) is an American sprinter.

== Early life ==
Raised in College Park, Georgia and South Fulton, Georgia, he attended Westlake High School in Atlanta. In 2024, he committed to the University of Georgia.

== Career ==
As a freshman in 2022, Njie won the Georgia Class 6A title in the 400m (46.41) and finished second in the 200m (21.01), which were U.S. No. 11 and U.S. No. 22 performances, respectively. They were also the fastest times nationally in the freshmen class.

As a sophomore in 2023, Njie again was first in the 400m (45.46), which was the fastest time ever recorded by a high school athlete in Georgia and second in the 200m (20.82) at the state meet, but this time it was in the Class 7A classification. Those were U.S. No. 3 and tied for U.S. No. 19 times, respectively, and U.S. No. 1 and U.S. No. 2 among sophomores. The 45.46, lowered the record of 45.78 that Will Sumner had set the previous year.

As a junior in 2024, Sidi was even better, winning the 200m (20.80) and finishing second in the 400m (45.37) in the 400m at the state meet. In June, he won the 400m (45.62) at the USATF U20 Outdoor Championships at Hayward Field, Eugene, Oregon, prevailing in a loaded field that included Arizona State's Jayden Davis and Class of 2024 star Ervin Pearson III, who is entering his freshman year at the University of Georgia.

He qualified for the final of the 400 metres at the 2024 World Athletics U20 Championships in Lima, Peru. In the final he came away with the bronze medal, running 46.29 seconds. He then won gold running the anchor leg for the American 4 x 400 metres relay team.

In January 2026, he ran 32.10 seconds for the 300 metres indoors at the Clemson Invitational, recording a win over Christopher Morales Williams. In May, Njie ran a personal best 45.13 seconds for the 400 m at the Torrin Lawrence Memorial in Athens, Georgia. Competing at the NCAA East Regional in Lexington, Kentucky on 29 May, he ran a personal best 44.24 seconds for the 400 metres. On 12 June, he placed third in the 400 m final at the 2026 NCAA Outdoor Championships, running 44.20 seconds.

== Personal life ==
His mother Alicia Njie-Johnson is a former track hurdler from Mount Vernon, Indiana. During his senior high school year, he signed an NIL deal with Brooks Running.
