= 2024 World Athletics U20 Championships – Men's 400 metres =

Men's 400 metres at the 2024 World Athletics U20 Championships
- Venue: Estadio Atlético de la VIDENA
- Dates: 28 August 2024 (heats & semi-finals); 29 August 2024 (final)
- Competitors: 51 from 35 nations
- Winning time: 45.69

Medalists
gold medal	Udeme Okon	South Africa
silver medal	Jayden Davis	United States
bronze medal	Sidi Njie	United States

The men's 400 metres at the 2024 World Athletics U20 Championships was held at the Estadio Atlético de la VIDENA in Lima, Peru on 28 and 29 August 2024.

== Records ==
U20 standing records prior to the 2024 World Athletics U20 Championships were as follows:

Record	Athlete & Nationality	Mark	Location	Date
World U20 Record	Steve Lewis (USA)	43.87	Seoul, South Korea	28 September 1988
Championship Record	Anthony Pesela (BOT)	44.58	Nairobi, Kenya	21 August 2021
World U20 Leading	Quincy Wilson (USA)	44.20	Eugene, United States	19 July 2024

== Results ==
=== Heats ===
The first 3 athletes in each heat (Q) and the next 3 fastest (q) qualified to the semi-finals.

==== Heat 1 ====
Rank	Lane	Athlete	Nation	Time	Notes
1	7	Jakub Szarapo	Poland	46.95	Q
2	8	Sean Doggett	Ireland	47.31	Q
3	9	Max Husemann	Germany	47.38	Q
4	5	Thabang Monngathipa	Botswana	47.57	
5	2	Alexandru Vochin	Romania	47.64	
6	3	Muh.Khalil Helmi	Malaysia	48.19	
—	6	Youssouf Djibrine	Qatar	DQ	TR17.2.3
—	4	Matas Janarauskas	Lithuania	DQ	TR17.2.3

==== Heat 2 ====
Rank	Lane	Athlete	Nation	Time	Notes
1	9	Terrell Thorne	Australia	46.44	Q, PB
2	6	Michał Kijewski	Poland	47.32	Q
3	2	Jarell Cruz	Puerto Rico	47.68	Q
4	8	Jaylen Bennett	Saint Kitts and Nevis	47.88	
5	5	Jabari Matheson	Jamaica	49.34	
6	4	Khalid Adoum	Qatar	49.81	
—	3	Dominik Jezernik	Croatia	DNF	
—	7	David García Zurita	Spain	DNS	

==== Heat 3 ====
Rank	Lane	Athlete	Nation	Time	Notes
1	4	Sidi Njie	United States	46.83	Q
2	3	Walid El Boussiri	Morocco	46.87	Q, PB
3	8	Kemarrio Bygrave	Jamaica	47.39	Q
4	9	Ryota Oishi	Japan	47.46	q
5	6	Victor Chaves	Brazil	47.52	
6	5	Aleksandrs Tiščenko	Latvia	47.98	
7	2	Jeffrey Cajo	Peru	48.75	
—	7	Bastian Elnan Aurstad	Norway	DNS	

==== Heat 4 ====
Rank	Lane	Athlete	Nation	Time	Notes
1	5	Jayden Davis	United States	46.32	Q
2	7	Vinícius Galeno	Brazil	47.55	Q
3	4	G.W.Jathya Kirulu	Sri Lanka	47.64	Q
4	3	Bryan Katoo	South Africa	48.19	
5	8	Dragos Nastasa	Romania	48.20	
6	2	Joshem Sylvester	Grenada	48.49	
7	9	Bapi Hansda	India	51.26	
8	6	James Lochauluka	ART	58.03	PB

==== Heat 5 ====
Rank	Lane	Athlete	Nation	Time	Notes
1	8	Kentaro Shirahata	Japan	46.45	Q, PB
2	2	Malachi Austin	Guyana	46.92	Q
3	9	Jaden Clement	Trinidad and Tobago	47.63	Q
4	4	Francesco De Santis	Italy	48.07	
5	6	Pishon Haughton	Canada	48.15	
6	3	Neo Ntelele	Lesotho	50.67	
—	5	Caleb Joshua	Nigeria	DQ	TR17.2.3
—	7	Ailixier Wumaier	China	DNS	

==== Heat 6 ====
Rank	Lane	Athlete	Nation	Time	Notes
1	8	Enerst Kumevu	Botswana	46.69	Q
2	6	Árpád Kovács	Hungary	46.89	Q
3	4	Jay Kumar	India	47.08	Q
4	7	Jett Grundy	Australia	47.44	q
5	2	Rafael Buelna	Mexico	47.82	
6	3	Kyrell Thomas	Trinidad and Tobago	48.02	
7	9	Matthew Galea Soler	Malta	48.40	
8	5	Emīls Lamba	Latvia	48.59	

==== Heat 7 ====
Rank	Lane	Athlete	Nation	Time	Notes
1	6	Udeme Okon	South Africa	47.03	Q
2	3	Fu Haoran	China	47.17	Q
3	5	Gafari Badmus	Nigeria	47.24	Q
4	7	Simone Giliberto	Italy	47.29	q, PB
5	8	Alessandro Greco	Austria	47.68	
6	4	Ian Andrey Pata	Ecuador	47.84	
7	9	Zion Miller	Bahamas	DNS	

=== Semi-finals ===
The first 2 athletes in each heat (Q) and the next 2 fastest (q) qualified to the semi-final.

==== Heat 1 ====
Rank	Lane	Athlete	Nation	Time	Notes
1	8	Jayden Davis	United States	45.79	Q
2	7	Udeme Okon	South Africa	47.08	Q
3	4	Vinícius Galeno	Brazil	47.29	
4	9	Kemarrio Bygrave	Jamaica	47.56	
5	6	Jakub Szarapo	Poland	47.57	
6	2	Jett Grundy	Australia	48.08	
7	5	Sean Doggett	Ireland	50.33	
—	3	Jaden Clement	Trinidad and Tobago	DNF	

==== Heat 2 ====
Rank	Lane	Athlete	Nation	Time	Notes
1	8	Kentaro Shirahata	Japan	46.30	Q, PB
2	7	Árpád Kovács	Hungary	46.70	Q
3	9	Jay Kumar	India	46.96	q, PB
4	3	Jarell Cruz	Puerto Rico	47.26	
5	4	Gafari Badmus	Nigeria	47.43	
6	6	Enerst Kumevu	Botswana	47.55	
7	2	Simone Giliberto	Italy	47.73	
—	5	Malachi Austin	Guyana	DNF	

==== Heat 3 ====
Rank	Lane	Athlete	Nation	Time	Notes
1	6	Sidi Njie	United States	46.56	Q
2	5	Terrell Thorne	Australia	46.66	Q
3	7	Walid El Boussiri	Morocco	46.73	q, PB
4	3	G.W.Jathya Kirulu	Sri Lanka	47.85	
5	2	Ryota Oishi	Japan	48.09	
6	4	Max Husemann	Germany	48.77	
—	8	Fu Haoran	China	DNS	
—	9	Michał Kijewski	Poland	DNS	

=== Final ===
Rank	Lane	Athlete	Nation	Time	Notes
1st place, gold medalist(s)	4	Udeme Okon	South Africa	45.69	
2nd place, silver medalist(s)	8	Jayden Davis	United States	46.08	
3rd place, bronze medalist(s)	7	Sidi Njie	United States	46.29	
4	9	Árpád Kovács	Hungary	46.60	
5	6	Kentaro Shirahata	Japan	46.83	
6	3	Jay Kumar	India	46.99	
7	5	Terrell Thorne	Australia	47.11	
—	2	Walid El Boussiri	Morocco	DQ	TR17.2.3
