= Matodzi Ndou =

South African athlete (born 2007)

Personal information
- Born: 19 March 2007 (age 19)

Sport
- Sport: Athletics
- Event: Hurdles
Medal record
Men's athletics
Representing South Africa
World U20 Championships
Bronze medal – third place	2026 Eugene	400m hurdles

Matodzi Ndou (born 19 March 2007) is a South African hurdler. He is the South African national under-20 record holder in the 400 metres hurdles.

He was also a bronze medalist in the 400 metres hurdles at the 2026 World Athletics U20 Championships.

== Biography ==
From Pretoria, he attended Curro Hazeldean High School and the University of Pretoria. In 2024, he ran a new South African record in the U17 110m hurdles with a time of 12.94 seconds.

In March 2026, he set the South African national under-20 record in the 400 metres hurdles at the South African Junior Championships in Germiston, winning in 48.64 seconds. In August, he was a finalist in the 400 metres hurdles at the 2026 World Athletics U20 Championships in the United States, winning the bronze medal with a time of 49.90 seconds.
