= Masters M65 300 metres hurdles world record progression =

This is the progression of world record improvements of the 300 metres hurdles M65 division of Masters athletics.

Key

Incomplete information Pending

Hand	Auto	Athlete	Nationality	Birthdate	Location	Date
	43.88	Guido Müller	Germany	22.12.1938	Arhus	25.07.2004
	45.20	Jack Greenwood	United States	05.02.1926	Turku	25.07.1991
	47.82	Arne Pettersson	Sweden	24.03.1923	Verona	27.06.1988
	50.63	Bob Hunt	United States		Uniondale	19.07.1986
