= Jayden Davis (sprinter) =

American athlete (born 2005)

Personal information
- Nationality: American
- Born: 10 March 2005 (age 21)

Sport
- Sport: Athletics
- Event: Sprint

Achievements and titles
- Personal best: 400m: 44.29 (2026)
Medal record
Men's athletics
Representing United States
World U20 Championships
Silver medal – second place	2024 Lima	400m
Gold medal – first place	2024 Lima	4×400 m relay

Jayden Davis (born 10 March 2005) is an American sprinter.

== Early and personal life ==
His parents were both college track athletes with his mother Trevaia Williams-Davis in the UNLV Athletic Hall of Fame as a five-time All-American sprinter and his father Terril Davis setting a Baylor University record over 800 meters in the 1990s. His brother Isaac also competes in athletics. He attended Mountain Pointe High School.

== Career ==
Competing for Arizona State University, Davis won gold in the 4x400 metres at the 2024 NCAA Indoor Championships in Boston, Massachusetts.

He earned a second place finish in the men's 400 meters in a time of 45.92 seconds at the USATF U20 Outdoor Championships at Hayward Field, Eugene, Oregon in June 2024.

He qualified fastest for the final of the 400 metres at the 2024 World Athletics U20 Championships in Lima, Peru. In the final he came away with the silver medal, running 46.08 seconds. He also won a gold medal with the American 4 x 400 metres relay team.

Davis placed sixth in the final of the 400 metres at the 2025 NCAA Division I Outdoor Track and Field Championships, running 45.44 in the semi-final and 45.91 in the final. In April 2026, Davis broke the long-standing Arizona State college record for the outdoor record 400 m at the Mt. SAC Relays, beating Vernon Norwood with a time of 44.29 seconds, surpassing the previous best by Ron Freeman which had stood for 58 years. In May, Davis won the 400 in 44.98 at the Big 12 Outdoor Championships and ran 44.84 at the West Regionals to finish behind Jordan Pierre and qualified for the 2026 NCAA Outdoor Championships.
