= Udeme Okon =

South African athlete (born 2005)

Personal information
- Born: 3 September 2005 (age 20)

Sport
- Sport: Athletics
- Event: Sprint

Achievements and titles
- Personal best(s): 200m: 20.36 (2025); 400m: 44.99 (2025)
Medal record
Men's athletics
Representing South Africa
World Championships
Bronze medal – third place	2025 Tokyo	4 × 400 m relay
World Relays
Gold medal – first place	2025 Guangzhou	4×400 m relay
Silver medal – second place	2026 Gaborone	4×400 m relay
World U20 Championships
Gold medal – first place	2024 Lima	400m
Silver medal – second place	2024 Lima	4×400 m relay

Udeme Okon (born 3 September 2005) is a South African sprinter. He won the gold medal over 400 metres at the 2024 World Athletics U20 Championships.

== Early life ==
He attends Florida Park High School in Roodepoort, Johannesburg.

== Career ==
He ran a personal best at the time of 20.54 seconds for the 200 metres in May 2024 at the South African national under-20 championships in Pretoria. That month, he ran a 400 metres personal best at the time of 45.41 seconds at the ACNW Track and Field League held in Potchefstroom.

He won the gold medal over 400 metres at the 2024 World Athletics U20 Championships, running 45.69 seconds in Lima, Peru. At the same championships, he also won silver in the 4 × 400 m relay.

At the South African Championships on 26 April 2025, he achieved his personal best in the 400m of 44.99 seconds at the McArthur Stadium in Potchefstroom, placing second after countryman Zakithi Nene. He was selected for the South African relay pool at the 2025 World Athletics Relays in China, where he was a gold medalist in the Men's 4 × 400 metres relay, running a split of 44.24 seconds in the final as the South African team set a new national record of 2:57.50. On 12 July 2025, he ran his fastest 200m to date at the Moore-Guldensporenmeeting in Kortrijk Belgium of 20.51 seconds, placing third.

He won a bronze medal at the 2025 World Athletics Championships in the men's 4 x 400 metres relay.

Competing on the opening day at the 2026 World Athletics Relays on 2 May, he was part of the South African men's 4 x 400 metres team which won their heat in 2:58.04.

== Personal life ==
He was born in South Africa to a Nigerian father and South African mother. He is the brother of South African footballer Ime Okon.
