= Masters M70 300 metres hurdles world record progression =

This is the progression of world record improvements of the 300 metres hurdles M70 division of Masters athletics.

Key

Incomplete information Pending

Hand	Auto	Athlete	Nationality	Birthdate	Location	Date
	45.24	Guido Müller	Germany	22.12.1938	Vaterstetten	10.07.2009
	49.07	Earl Fee	Canada	22.03.1929	Orlando	28.08.1999
	50.07	Tor Trondset	Sweden	16.11.1935	Riccione	04.09.2007
	50.22	James Stookey	United States	20.01.1930	San Diego	17.08.2000
50.4		Albertus Van Zyl	South Africa	13.08.1922		17.04.1993
	52.44	Daniel Bulkley	United States	04.05.1917	Eugene	03.08.1989
	53.98	Gilberto Gonzalez	Puerto Rico		Uniondale	19.07.1986
