= Antti Sainio =

Finnish athlete

Personal information
- Nationality: Finnish
- Born: 17 May 2005 (age 21)

Sport
- Sport: Athletics
- Event: Hurdling

Achievements and titles
- Personal best(s): 400m hurdles: 48.61 (Bergen, 2025) NU20R
Medal record
Men's athletics
Representing Finland
World U20 Championships
Bronze medal – third place	2024 Lima	400m hurdles
European U20 Championships
Silver medal – second place	2023 Jerusalem	400m hurdles

Antti Sainio (born 17 May 2005) is a Finnish hurdler. He was a silver medalist at the 2023 European Athletics U20 Championships, and a bronze medalist at the 2024 World Athletics U20 Championships in the 400 metres hurdles.

== Career ==
Sainio is coached by his mother Maarit Palmroos. He ran a time of 51.43 in the semi-finals of the 2022 European Athletics U18 Championships in Jerusalem, Israel, but did not run in the final due to a hamstring problem. He won the silver medal the following year at the 2023 European Athletics U20 Championships on the same track in Jerusalem, Israel, in the 400 metres hurdles, running a time of 50.19 seconds in a Finnish one-two behind compatriot Jere Haapalainen. The pair had been room-mates at the Championships and Finnish coach Juha Lehto said that following ten months of training, the race went "according to plan".

In June 2024, he won the senior national title at the Finnish Athletics Championships at the age of 18 years-old with a time of 49.99 seconds. Also that month, Sainio recorded a new U20 Finnish record time of 49.91 seconds for the 400 metres hurdles. He qualified for the final of the 400m hurdles at the 2024 World Athletics U20 Championships in Lima, Peru with a new Finnish age group record of 49.36 seconds. Running in the final, he won the bronze medal with a time of 49.61 seconds.

He set a new national record of 48.97 seconds in the semifinal, and improved the national record again to 48.61 seconds in the final, to finish fourth overall at the 2025 European Athletics U23 Championships in Bergen, Norway.

== Personal life ==
He is a member of Tampere Pyrintö in Tampere, Finland. He is diabetic and at the age of 16 years-old he was diagnosed with a precursor to a stress fracture and a structural defect in his lower back that would never fully heal. He is a Christian, and after winning the Karela Games in 2024 he presented a bible to the television cameras.
