= Jordan Pierre =

American sprinter

Sport
- Sport: Athletics
- Event: Sprint

Achievements and titles
- Personal best: 400m: 44.12 (2026)

Jordan Pierre is an American sprinter who competes primarily over 400 metres. He has had podium finishes at the NCAA Championships over 400 metres, both outdoors and indoors and in 2026 set the University of Arkansas school record at the distance.

== Biography ==
From Orlando, Florida, Pierre attended Maynard Evans High School, where he won Florida state high school titles in the 400 metres.

Later a student at the University of Arkansas-Pine Bluff, Pierre qualified for the 2025 NCAA Outdoor Championships in Eugene, Oregon over 400 metres running a personal best 45.44 seconds in the semi-final, before placing third overall in the final in 45.75 seconds in June 2025.

Pierre transferred to the University of Arkansas prior to the 2026 indoor season. In February 2026, he placed second in the 400 metres at SEC Championships and ran 45.06 seconds, taking more than two seconds from his indoor personal best. He placed third competing for the University of Arkansas over 400 metres at the 2026 NCAA Indoor Championships, finishing in 44.85 seconds in Fayetteville, Arkansas. In May, Pierre set a new Razorback school record in the 400 metres with a personal best time of 44.12 seconds in finishing runner-up to Samuel Ogazi at the SEC Championships. The previous Arkansas school record of 44.48 was set by Roddie Haley in 1986. He also ran as part of the Arkansas team which secured a third-place finish in the 4 x 400 metres relay, with a time of 3:00.62, third on the University of Arkansas all-time list. Later that month, he ran 44.81 seconds for the 400 m at the West Regionals, to finish ahead of Jayden Davis and qualified for the 2026 NCAA Outdoor Championships, where he helped Arkansas to win the team title with a fifth place finish in the 400 m final.
