= 2026 World Athletics U20 Championships – Men's 400 metres hurdles =

Men's 400 metres hurdles at the 2026 World Athletics U20 Championships
- Venue: Hayward Field
- Dates: 6 August (Round 1); 8 August (Semi-finals); 9 August (Final)
- Competitors: 67
- Winning time: 48.59 AU20R

Medalists
gold medal	Michal Rada	Czech Republic
silver medal	Taiju Goto	Japan
bronze medal	Matodzi Ndou	South Africa

The men's 400 metres hurdles at the 2026 World Athletics U20 Championships was held at Hayward Field in Eugene, United States on 6, 8 and 9 August 2026.

== Records ==
U20 standing records prior to the 2026 World Athletics U20 Championships were as follows:

Record	Athlete & Nationality	Mark	Location	Date
World U20 Record	Roshawn Clarke (JAM)	47.34	Budapest, Hungary	21 August 2023
Championship Record	Kerron Clement (USA)	48.51	Grosseto, Italy	16 July 2004
World U20 Leading	Taiju Goto (JPN)	48.09	Nagoya, Japan	14 June 2026

== Results ==
=== Round 1 ===
Round 1 took place in the morning session on 6 August 2026.

==== Heat 1 ====
Place	Lane	Athlete	Nation	Time	Notes
1	8	Miller Warme	United States	49.88	Q
2	6	Ethan Dewhirst	Ireland	50.73	Q
3	5	Lucas de Almeida	Brazil	51.78	Q
4	7	Anton Smiian	Ukraine	52.83	
5	3	Jules Nauer	Switzerland	53.97	
6	4	William Tait	Australia	54.72	
7	2	Raphael Briel	Austria	55.33	
—	9	Avinaash Nair Sathiasselan	Malaysia	DQ	TR17.3.3

==== Heat 2 ====
Place	Lane	Athlete	Nation	Time	Notes
1	5	Alex Ibañez	Spain	50.77	Q
2	3	Robert Miller	Jamaica	51.27	Q
3	4	Diego Mancini	Italy	51.32	Q
4	6	Nino Camiu	Switzerland	51.82	PB
5	8	Mohamed Atheeb Riffai	Sri Lanka	52.14	PB
6	2	Adam Boškovič	Slovakia	52.48	PB
7	9	Magnus Skupin-Alfa	Germany	53.30	
8	7	Travis Collet	France	57.28	

==== Heat 3 ====
Place	Lane	Athlete	Nation	Time	Notes
1	9	Lesibe Dikgale	South Africa	50.58	Q
2	7	Rayhan Mourtada	Great Britain	50.68	Q, PB
3	6	Naif Rashid Alsubaie	Saudi Arabia	50.91	Q
4	8	Juan Francisco Ibarra	Mexico	51.11	q, PB
5	3	Joel Reyes	Puerto Rico	51.54	q, PB
6	5	Alonso Guzman	Chile	51.87	PB
7	2	Lovro Šourek	Croatia	53.04	
8	4	Jonas Rosholt	Norway	54.92	

==== Heat 4 ====
Place	Lane	Athlete	Nation	Time	Notes
1	3	Jahvanie Tyrell	Jamaica	51.02	Q
2	6	Marek Váňa	Czech Republic	51.27	Q
3	2	Omari Brown	Trinidad and Tobago	51.50	Q
4	4	Shavindu Nimasha Maha	Sri Lanka	51.61	PB
5	8	Tommaso Ardizzone	Italy	51.80	SB
6	5	Matúš Havaš	Slovakia	52.88	
7	9	Martin Stoyanov	Bulgaria	53.68	
8	7	Amit Kumar	India	54.01	

==== Heat 5 ====
Place	Lane	Athlete	Nation	Time	Notes
1	4	Matodzi Ndou	South Africa	50.69	Q
2	7	Diego Espeso	Spain	50.93	Q
3	1	Samuel Mosquera	Colombia	51.97	Q
4	5	Nikolas Raeth	Germany	52.60	
5	3	Daryen Ko	Singapore	52.72	NU20R
6	2	William Tapodi	Canada	53.25	
7	8	Benedek Tompa	Hungary	53.56	
8	9	Max Baxa	Austria	54.46	
9	6	Tieano Ferguson	Bahamas	54.93	

==== Heat 6 ====
Place	Lane	Athlete	Nation	Time	Notes
1	1	Taiju Goto	Japan	50.45	Q
2	9	Brady Tse	Canada	50.97	Q, PB
3	2	Steven Mateus Mendez	Ecuador	51.62	Q
4	5	Ivan Cabanda	Philippines	51.75	NU20R
5	3	Tae-eon Park	South Korea	52.44	PB
6	6	Med Amine Barkallah	Tunisia	53.32	
7	8	German David Muñoz	Argentina	53.97	
8	7	Ali Abdulfattah Alrumayh	Saudi Arabia	54.03	
9	4	Toms Melderis	Latvia	54.62	

==== Heat 7 ====
Place	Lane	Athlete	Nation	Time	Notes
1	9	Michal Rada	Czech Republic	50.68	Q
2	3	Adam Namar	Morocco	51.39	Q
3	6	Des O'Neill	Ireland	51.45 [.445]	Q, PB
4	5	Juan David Arboleda	Colombia	51.45 [.447]	q, PB
5	8	Benjamin Ignacio Tejos	Chile	52.10	PB
6	2	Kristen Colly	France	52.47	
7	4	Santiago Quintero	Venezuela	53.31	
8	7	Long Hei Cyrus Chung	Hong Kong	53.78	SB
9	1	Maximiliano Saucedo	Mexico	53.84	

==== Heat 8 ====
Place	Lane	Athlete	Nation	Time	Notes
1	6	Keenen Davis	United States	50.97	Q
2	3	Ryo Chiba	Japan	51.58	Q
3	5	Rashad Gibson	Barbados	51.74	Q
4	9	Zixian Gan	China	52.07	
5	2	Wilton dos Santos	Brazil	52.17	
6	7	Yassine Chabane	Algeria	53.02	
7	8	Kiril Savchenko	Kazakhstan	53.88	
8	4	Ethan Williams	Australia	59.91	

=== Semi-finals ===
Semi-finals took place in the afternoon session on 8 August 2026.

==== Heat 1 ====
Place	Lane	Athlete	Nation	Time	Notes
1	5	Miller Warme	United States	49.48	Q
2	6	Jahvanie Tyrell	Jamaica	49.98	Q, PB
3	8	Marek Váňa	Czech Republic	50.22	Q
4	1	Samuel Mosquera	Colombia	50.54	PB
5	9	Diego Mancini	Italy	50.64	PB
6	7	Alex Ibañez	Spain	50.95	
7	3	Des O'Neill	Ireland	51.28	PB
8	4	Brady Tse	Canada	51.44	
9	2	Juan Francisco Ibarra	Mexico	52.31	

==== Heat 2 ====
Place	Lane	Athlete	Nation	Time	Notes
1	7	Michal Rada	Czech Republic	49.67	Q
2	5	Lesibe Dikgale	South Africa	50.50	Q
3	4	Ethan Dewhirst	Ireland	50.53	Q
4	6	Rayhan Mourtada	Great Britain	50.59	PB
5	2	Rashad Gibson	Barbados	51.72	
6	3	Steven Mateus Mendez	Ecuador	51.73	
7	1	Joel Reyes	Puerto Rico	51.76	
8	9	Ryo Chiba	Japan	52.37	
9	8	Adam Namar	Morocco	54.08	

==== Heat 3 ====
Place	Lane	Athlete	Nation	Time	Notes
1	5	Taiju Goto	Japan	49.19	Q
2	6	Matodzi Ndou	South Africa	49.66	Q
3	7	Keenen Davis	United States	50.47	Q
4	2	Lucas de Almeida	Brazil	50.88	
5	8	Robert Miller	Jamaica	50.89	
6	9	Naif Rashid Alsubaie	Saudi Arabia	51.29	
7	4	Diego Espeso	Spain	51.33	
8	1	Juan David Arboleda	Colombia	51.43	PB
9	3	Omari Brown	Trinidad and Tobago	52.14	

=== Final ===
The final took place in the afternoon session on 9 August 2026.

Place	Lane	Athlete	Nation	Time	Notes
1st place, gold medalist(s)	5	Michal Rada	Czech Republic	48.59	AU20R
2nd place, silver medalist(s)	7	Taiju Goto	Japan	49.23	
3rd place, bronze medalist(s)	4	Matodzi Ndou	South Africa	49.90	
4	6	Miller Warme	United States	50.06	
5	1	Ethan Dewhirst	Ireland	51.05	
6	3	Marek Váňa	Czech Republic	51.42	
7	9	Samuel Mosquera	Colombia	51.99	
8	8	Jahvanie Tyrell	Jamaica	53.23	
9	2	Keenen Davis	United States	54.49	
