= Sam Lunt =

British athlete (born 2005)

Personal information
- Nationality: British
- Born: Sam; 23 October 2005 (age 21)

Sport
- Sport: Athletics
- Event: Hurdling

Achievements and titles
- Personal bests: 400 m hurdles: 49.17 (Karlstad, 2026); 400 m: 45.16 (Brussels, 2026)
Medal record
Men's athletics
Representing Great Britain
European Championships
Silver medal – second place	2026 Birmingham	4 × 400 m relay
European U20 Championships
Gold medal – first place	2023 Jerusalem	4 × 400 m relay

Sam Lunt (born 23 October 2005) is a British sprinter and hurdler. He won a silver medal with the Great Britain men's 4 × 400 metres team at the 2026 European Championships.

== Early life ==
From Eastham, Merseyside, he attended Neston High School. He was a keen footballer in his youth before focusing on athletics. A member of Wirral Athletics Club, he set a new under-17 British record in the 400 m hurdles with a times of 51.83 seconds, and then 51:55 seconds, in consecutive weeks in July 2022. He later studied at Birmingham City University.

== Career ==
In February 2023, he reached the semi-finals in the 400 metres at the senior 2023 British Indoor Championships as a 17-year-old.

He was a finalist in the 400 metres hurdles at the 2023 European Athletics U20 Championships in Jerusalem. He won gold in the 4 × 400 metres relay at the same event.

He competed at the 2024 World Athletics U20 Championships in Lima, Peru in August 2024 in the men's 400 metres hurdles. He qualified for the final with a run of 50.00 seconds, a British national U20 record. In the final, he placed fifth overall, running 50.29 seconds.

In October 2024, he was nominated by Athletics Weekly for best British male junior. In November 2024, he was named by British Athletics on the Olympic Futures Programme for 2025. He was named in the British team for the 2025 World Athletics Relays in Guangzhou. He made his senior international debut in the mixed 4 × 400 metres relay, alongside Josh Faulds, Emily Newnham and Nicole Yeargin as the British quartet won their heat to qualify for the final and secure a place for Britain at the 2025 World Championships. On 2 August, he qualified for the final of the 400 metres hurdles at the 2025 UK Athletics Championships in Birmingham. In October 2025, he was retained on the British Athletics Olympic Futures Programme for 2025/26.

In May 2026, Lunt ran a personal best for the 400 metres with 45.16 seconds in Brussels. In June, Lunt won over 400 metres at the Josef Odložil Memorial in Prague. That month, he reached the final of the 400 metres at the 2026 British Championships, placing seventh overall. The following month, Lunt ran a new personal best for the 400 m hurdles with 49.17 seconds at the Folksam Grand Prix in Karlstad, Sweden. In August 2026, he competed in the men's 4 × 400 metres relay at the 2026 European Athletics Championships in Birmingham, winning the silver medal with the team having run in the opening round. In October 2026, he was retained on the 2026/27 Olympic Futures Programme awarded by UK Athletics.
