= Masters M60 300 metres hurdles world record progression =

This is the progression of world record improvements of the 300 metres hurdles M60 division of Masters athletics.

Key

Incomplete information Pending

Hand	Auto	Athlete	Nationality	Birthdate	Location	Date
	42.31	Guido Müller	Germany	22.12.1938	Gateshead	01.08.1999
	43.49	Jack Greenwood	United States	05.02.1926	Eugene	03.08.1989
	46.31	Jack Greenwood	United States	05.02.1926	Uniondale	19.07.1986
