= Kazuki Kurokawa =

Japanese hurdler (born 2001)

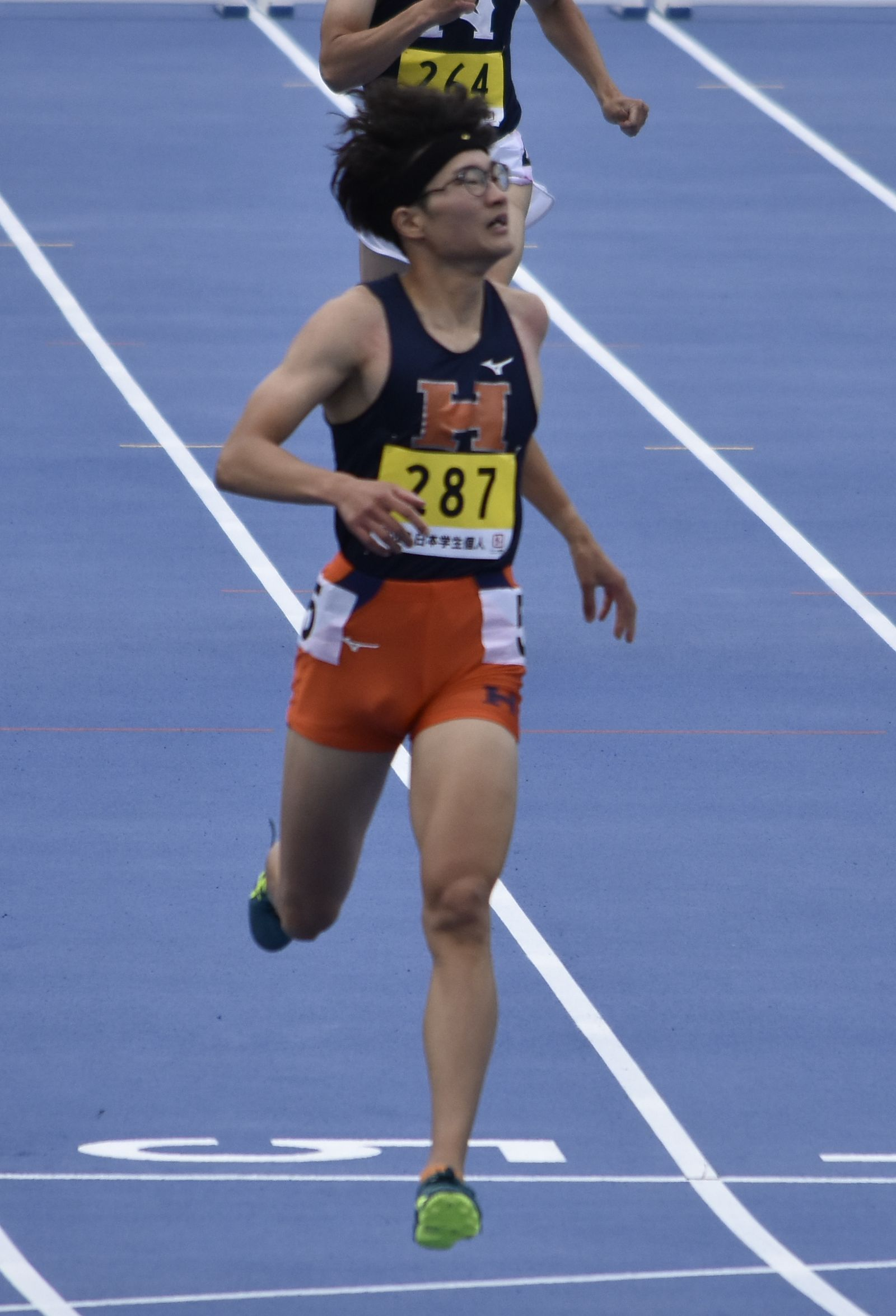
- Kazuki Kurokawa

Personal information
- Nationality: Japanese
- Born: 17 June 2001 (age 25) Shimonoseki, Japan

Sport
- Sport: Athletics
- Event: Hurdles

Kazuki Kurokawa (黒川和樹, born 17 June 2001) is a Japanese athlete. He competed in the men's 400 metres hurdles event at the 2020 Summer Olympics.
