= Njabulo Mbatha =

South African athlete (born 2007)

Personal information
- Born: 24 April 2007 (age 19)

Sport
- Sport: Athletics
- Event: Hurdles

Achievements and titles
- Personal best(s): 400m: 47.03 (2024); 400mH: 49.06 (2025)
Medal record
Men's athletics
Representing South Africa
World U20 Championships
Silver medal – second place	2024 Lima	4×400 m relay
African U20 Championships
Gold medal – first place	2025 Abeokuta	400m hurdles

Njabulo Mbatha (born 24 April 2007) is a South African track and field athlete who primarily competes over 400 metres hurdles.

== Biography ==
From Newcastle, KwaZulu-Natal, Mbatha attended Arbor Park School, initially using athletics to improve his speed and playing rugby, and he earned a rugby scholarship at Northwood Boys High School in 2021 before later studying at TuksSport High School in Pretoria from 2023.

Mbatha was the South African junior champion in 2024 and while competing at the senior South African Athletics Championships in Pietermaritzburg, he became the youngest athlete to win a medal in a senior 400m hurdles final. His time of 49.57 seconds was the second fastest in the world for an U18 athlete in 2024. Mbatha placed fourth overall in the 400 metres hurdles, and won a silver medal in the 4 × 400 m relay, later that year at the 2024 World Athletics U20 Championships in Lima, Peru.

In February 2025, competing for TuksSport High School, he ran 47.35 for the 400m sprint in Guateng. In March 2025, while competing at the Grand Prix Meeting in Pilditch, he won the 400 metres hurdles in a personal best of 49.40 seconds. In April 2025, he set a new personal best again, running 49.06 seconds in winning the Botswana Golden Grand Prix in Gaborone, ahead of experienced Kenyan Wiseman Mukhobe. He was runner-up over 400 m hurdles to Sabelo Dhlamini at the 2025 South African Championships later that month, in 49.28. He won the 400 m hurdles gold medal at the 2025 African U20 Championships in Abeokuta, Nigeria, in July 2025.
