= Michal Rada =

Czech athlete (born 2007)

Personal information
- Born: 25 May 2007 (age 19)

Sport
- Sport: Athletics
- Event: Hurdles

Achievements and titles
- Personal bests: 60m hurdles: 7.74 (Prague, 2025); 400m hurdles: 48.59 (Eugene, 2026) AU20R
Medal record
Men's athletics
Representing Czech Republic
World U20 Championships
Gold medal – first place	2026 Eugene	400m hurdles
Silver medal – second place	2024 Lima	400 m hurdles
European U20 Championships
Gold medal – first place	2025 Tampere	400 m hurdles
Gold medal – first place	2025 Tampere	4x400 m relay
European U18 Championships
Gold medal – first place	2024 Banská Bystrica	400 m hurdles

Michal Rada (born 25 May 2007) is a Czech hurdler. He was the gold medalist at the 2026 World U20 Championships in the 400 metres hurdles having previously also won the European U18 and U20 championships.

== Early and personal life ==
Born 10 minutes apart, his twin sister Nina Radová also competes in athletics. Both attended the Česká School of Sports Grammar. Both took part in the 2022 Czech Student Championships in Prague, with Michal winning gold in the long jump and silver in the 60 metres hurdles.

== Career ==
A member of České Budějovice Sokol, he is coached by Jiří Couf. In January 2024, he set a new personal best for the 60 metres hurdles of 7.78 seconds, in Prague.

In June 2024, he broke the Czech junior record for the 400 metres running 49.89 seconds at the Josef Odložil Memorial. He won gold at the 2024 European Athletics U18 Championships in the 400 metres hurdles, running an under-18 European best time in July 2024, in Banská Bystrica, Slovakia. His twin sister, Nina Radová, also won a gold medal on the same day at the Championships, in the women's 400m hurdles event.

He competed at the 2024 World Athletics U20 Championships in Lima, Peru in August 2024 in the men's 400 metres hurdles. He qualified for the final with a run of 49.36 seconds, a world U20 lead, a personal best and national U20 record. In the final, he lowered the national record to 49.30 and won the silver medal. In September 2024, he was nominated for the European Athletics Rising Star award.

In January 2025, he set a new personal best of 7.74 seconds for the 60 metres hurdles in Prague. In July 2025, he was selected for the 2025 European Athletics U20 Championships in Tampere, winning the gold medal with a championship record of 48.78 in the men's 400m hurdles. He also anchored the Czech 4 × 400 m relay team to the gold medal. In September 2025, he was nominated for the European Athletics male rising star award.

In August 2026, he won the gold medal in the final of the 400 metres hurdles at the 2026 World Athletics U20 Championships in a new European under-20 record time of 48.59 seconds. He was named European Athletics Men’s Rising Star for 2026. He was also named Czech Junior Athlete of the Year by Czech Athletics.
