= Vance Nilsson =

American athlete (born 2005)

Personal information
- Nationality: United States
- Born: 7 November 2005 (age 20)

Sport
- Sport: Athletics
- Event: Hurdling

Achievements and titles
- Personal bests: 400m hurdles: 48.06 (Eugene, 2026)
Medal record
Men's athletics
Representing United States
World U20 Championships
Gold medal – first place	2024 Lima	400m hurdles

Vance Nilsson (born 7 November 2005) is an American hurdler. He won the gold medal in the 400 metres hurdles at the 2024 World Athletics U20 Championships, later also winning the 2026 NCAA Outdoor Championships.

== Early life ==
From Arizona, he attended Gilbert High School. In 2024, he was named the Gatorade athlete of the year for Arizona and signed a letter of intent to study at the University of Florida.

== Career ==
In May 2024, Nilsson ran 34.83 seconds in the 300 metres hurdles to set a new national high school record at the AIA State High School Track & Field Championships in Mesa, Arizona. It was the first time an American high school athlete has gone under 35 seconds in the event.

He won the USATF U20 Championships in the 400 metres hurdles in June 2024. That month, he competed in the US Olympic Trials in Eugene, Oregon where he ran 49.77 seconds, the fourth-fastest time by an American high schooler.

In August 2024, he ran a 49.26 personal best to win the gold medal in the 400 metres hurdles at the 2024 World Athletics U20 Championships in Lima, Peru.

On 12 June 2026, Nilsson won the 400 metres hurdles final in a personal best 48.06 seconds at the 2026 NCAA Outdoor Championships.
