= Fintan Dewhirst =

Irish sprinter (born 2005)

Personal information
- Nationality: Irish
- Born: 31 December 2005 (age 20)

Sport
- Sport: Athletics
- Events: Sprint, Hurdles
- Club: Tir Chonaill AC

Achievements and titles
- Personal bests: 200m: 22.33 (2022); 400m: 47.23 (2026); 400mH: 51.19 (2024)
Medal record
Men's athletics
Representing Ireland
European U18 Championships
Silver medal – second place	2022 Jerusalem	400m hurdles

Fintan Dewhirst (born 31 December 2005) is an Irish sprinter and hurdler. He was a silver medalist at the 2022 European Athletics U18 Championships and won the 400 metres hurdles for his first senior national title at the Irish Athletics Championships in 2026.

== Biography ==
From County Donegal, he attended St Columbas Comprehensive in Glenties, and Kilkenny NS, before later studying Sports and Science on a Level 2 Sports Scholarship at the University of Limerick. He took part in varied sports growing up including rugby with Donegal Town, soccer with Fintown Harps and Gaelic Football with Naomh Conaill, but became a member of Tir Chonaill athletics club, where his mother is also a coach, and where he was coached by Brian McGonagle and Eamon Harvey, later being coached by Hayley and Drew Harrison in Limerick. His brother Ethan also competes in athletics.

He won a silver medal in the 400 metres hurdles (84.0 cm) at the 2022 European Athletics U18 Championships in Jerusalem, finishing in a time of 51.65 seconds, almost a second off his previous personal best that he had recently set in the quarter-finals in Jerusalem of 52.58s. In 2023, he won at the Irish Schools Championships.

Dewhirst made his senior debut competing in the 400 metres hurdles for Ireland at the 2025 European Athletics Team Championships in Maribor, Slovenia, helping Ireland to a fifth-place finish overall in the Second Division. That summer, he also competed for Ireland at the 2025 European Athletics U23 Championships in Bergen, Norway.

In March 2026, he finished runner-up to Sean Doggett over 400 metres at the Irish Indoor Championships. He was named in the Irish team for the 2026 World Athletics Relays in Botswana. On 26 July, he won the 400 metres hurdles at the 2026 Irish championships in 51.76 seconds. In August, he placed fifth in the final of the 400 metres hurdles at the 2026 World Athletics U20 Championships in Eugene, Oregon.
