= Sabelo Dhlamini =

South African athlete (born 1995)

Personal information
- Born: 17 January 1995 (age 31)

Sport
- Sport: Athletics
- Event: Hurdles

Achievements and titles
- Personal bests: 400m: 46.81 (2026); 400mH: 48.57 (2025)

Sabelo Dhlamini (born 17 January 1995) is a South African hurdler. He became South African champion in the 400 metres hurdles in 2025 and represented South Africa at the 2025 World Athletics Championships.

== Biography ==
Dhlamini won the men’s final in the 400 metres hurdles at the 2025 South African Championships ahead of Njabulo Mbatha, winning with 48.57, setting a personal best. Competing in Europe throughout the Europeans summer he won races in Geeece and Sweden and recorded his fastest time outside South Africa with 48.88 seconds racing in Belgium. That August, Dhlamini set an official national best in the 300 metres hurdles at the Maribor International Athletics Meeting in Slovenia with 34.34 seconds, to move to seventh on the world all-time list. He competed at the 2025 World Athletics Championships in the men's 400 metres hurdles in Tokyo, Japan, in September 2025, running 49.50 seconds without advancing to the semi-finals.

In April 2026, he was runner-up in the 400 metres hurdles at the Botswana Golden Grand Prix in Gaborone. He competed in the 400 metres hurdles at the 2026 Commonwealth Games in Glasgow, Scotland.

== Personal life ==
He studied for a Master’s degree in Public Governance and Management at the University of Johannesburg. Alongside his own career and studies, he has worked at Trinityhouse Glenvista High School as an athletics coach.
