= Conor Kelly =

Irish sprinter (born 2007)

Personal information
- Nationality: Irish
- Born: 17 July 2007 (age 19)

Sport
- Sport: Athletics
- Event: Sprint

Achievements and titles
- Personal bests: 200m: 21.40 (2025); 400m: 45.83 (2025) NU20R
Medal record
Men's athletics
Representing Ireland
European U20 Championships
Gold medal – first place	2025 Tempere	400 m
European U18 Championships
Bronze medal – third place	2024 Banska Bystrica	400 m

Conor Kelly (born 17 July 2007) is an Irish sprinter. He became Irish national indoor champion in 2025 over 400 metres and competed at the 2025 European Athletics Indoor Championships. He is the 2025 European Athletics U20 champion at the distance, and the national record holder in that age group.

== Career ==
He is a member of Finn Valley and Hercules Wimbledon athletics club. He was a bronze medalist at the 2024 European Athletics U18 Championships in Slovakia, over 400 metres in an Irish U18 record time of 46.97 seconds. In June 2024, along with Saoirse Fitzgerald, Sean Doggett and Maria Zakharenko he was a member of the Irish mixed relay team which set a new national U20 Record of 3:24.91. He competed at the 2024 World Athletics U20 Championships in Lima, Peru, as part of the Irish men's 4 × 400 m relay team which placed seventh in the final.

He won the 400 metres title at the Irish Indoor Athletics Championship at Abbotstown on 23 February 2025, running an Irish U20 record of 46.54 seconds. This came just 24 hours after he had lowered the record to 46.63 seconds in the semi-final. He was named in the Irish mixed relay team for the 2025 European Athletics Indoor Championships in Apeldoorn. He ran the opening leg of the mixed 4 × 400 m relay, in which Ireland finished fifth overall.

He was selected for the Irish relay pool for the 2025 World Athletics Relays in Guangzhou, China in May 2025. He ran in the mixed 4 × 400 m relay as Ireland finished second in their heat to qualify for the 2025 World Championships. On the second day, he also competed the Men's 4 × 400 metres relay.

At the Bauhaus Juniorengala in Mannheim, Germany, he ran 46.09 seconds for the 400 metres to set a national U20 record in June 2025. He competed in the 400 metres at the 2025 European Athletics U20 Championships in Tampere, Finland, winning his heat in 46.94 seconds, and his semi-final in 46.58 seconds. He won the gold medal in the final in a new national U20 record of 45.83. He was named in the Irish relay pool for the 2025 World Athletics Championships in Tokyo, Japan. He ran on the opening day in the mixed 4 × 400 metres relay.

== Personal life ==
He was born in London to Irish parents. His mother, Mary Jo, is from the Doherty family of bakers in Derry, while his father, Steve, was born in Lisburn but grew up in Dublin. He has said “I'm Irish. I don't even think about it when people ask me. I love being from Derry; get me back there and get a few buns in me from Doherty’s bakery. I get to see everyone I know, and I love it". Following his success as a 17-year-old in the early part of 2025, it was reported that Kelly was considering multiple offers to attend University in the United States to compete on a scholarship in the American collegiate system. He began attending the University of Texas at Austin in 2025.
