= Sean Doggett =

Irish sprinter (born 2006)

Personal information
- Nationality: Irish
- Born: 5 November 2006 (age 19)
- Height: 5’4

Sport
- Sport: Athletics
- Event: Sprint
- Club: Athenry AC

Achievements and titles
- Personal bests: 200m: 22.39 (Athlone, 2024); 400m: 46.52 (Tampere, 2025)

Sean Doggett (born 5 November 2006) is an Irish sprinter. He won the 400 metres at the 2026 Irish Indoor Athletics Championships.

== Biography ==
He was educated at Coláiste an Éachréidh in Athenry, County Galway. He is a member of Athenry Athletics Club. He won indoor and outdoor age-group national titles over 800 metres. He started running 400 metres in 2023 and won Irish under-18 400m national titles, and an under-19 400m indoor national title.

He ran a personal best 46.71 seconds for the 400 metres at the Belfast Track Meet in May 2024. In June 2024, he became the youngest athlete to compete for Ireland in a senior European Championships when he ran as part of the Irish men's 4 x 400 metres relay team at the 2024 European Championships in Rome, Italy, at the age of 17 years-old, although the team did not progress from their heat, placing fifth. That month, alongside Saoirse Fitzgerald, Conor Kelly, and Maria Zakharenko, he was a member of the Irish mixed 4 × 400 m relay team which set a new national U20 record of 3:24.91.

He was a semi-finalist in the individual 400 metres at the 2024 World Athletics U20 Championships in Lima, Peru. At the championships, he was also part of the Irish men's 4 × 400 m relay team which placed qualifier for the final and placed seventh overall.

In February 2025, Doggett placed third overall in the men’a 400m in 47.69, behind winner Conor Kelly at the Irish Indoor Athletics Championships in Abbottstown, Dublin. In May 2025, he won the Irish Schools Track and Field Championships in Tullamore, and broke Brian Gregan's schools record over 400m from 2008, with a time of 47.22 seconds. At the Bauhaus Juniorengala in Mannheim, Germany in June, he ran as part of the Irish men's 4 × 400 m relay team which set a new national U20 record; running alongside Alex Cullen, Kelly, and David Davitt.

He was a finalist in the individual 400 metres at the 2025 European Athletics U20 Championships in Tampere, Finland; running a personal best 46.52 seconds in the semi-final before placing seventh in the final in 47.16.

Competing at the Cosma Indoor Cup in Kaunas, Lithuania, a World Athletics Indoor Tour Challenger event in February 2026, Doggett ran a new indoors personal best for the 400 metres of 47.30. On 1 March, he won his first national senior title, winning the 400 metres ahead of Fintan Dewhirst at the Irish Indoor Athletics Championships in 47.33 seconds. He was named in the Irish team for the 2026 World Athletics Relays in Botswana, running on the opening day in the mixed 4 × 400 m relay alongside Jack Raftery, Sophie Becker and Sharlene Mawdsley. In August 2026, he competed in the men's 4 × 400 metres relay at the 2026 European Athletics Championships in Birmingham, England.
